= 1978 United States gubernatorial elections =

- November 7, 1978

38 governorships 36 states; 2 territories
	Majority party	Minority party
Party	Democratic	Republican
Seats before	37	12
Seats after	32	18
Seat change	▼5	▲6
Seats up	26	9
Seats won	21	15
	Third party
Party	Independent
Seats before	1
Seats after	0
Seat change	▼1
Seats up	1
Seats won	0
- Republican hold Republican gain Democratic hold Democratic gain

United States gubernatorial elections were held on November 7, 1978, in 36 states and two territories. The Republicans had a net gain of six seats, Democrats sustained a net loss of five seats, and there would be no governors of any other parties following these elections.

This was the first year in which Illinois held a gubernatorial election in a midterm election year since 1846. The state of Illinois moved its gubernatorial election date from presidential election years to midterm congressional election years. This election coincided with the Senate and the House elections.

== Election results ==
=== States ===
State	Incumbent	Party	First elected	Result	Candidates
Alabama	George Wallace	Democratic	1962; 1966 (term-limited); 1970	Incumbent term-limited. New governor elected. Democratic hold.	✓ Fob James (Democratic) 72.6%; H. Guy Hunt (Republican) 25.9%; Jim Partain (Prohibition) 1.1%; Richard Dare (Independent) 0.5%
Alaska	Jay Hammond	Republican	1974	Incumbent re-elected.	✓ Jay Hammond (Republican) 39.1%; Wally Hickel (write-in) 26.4%; Chancy Croft (Democratic) 20.2%; Tom Kelly (Independent) 12.3%; Don R. Wright (Alaskan Ind.) 1.9%
Arizona	Bruce Babbitt	Democratic	1978 (Note: Babbitt took office after his predecessor (Wesley Bolin) died.)	Incumbent elected to full term.	✓ Bruce Babbitt (Democratic) 52.5%; Evan Mecham (Republican) 44.8%; V. Gene Lewter (Libertarian) 1.9%; Jessica Sampson (Socialist Workers) 0.8%
Arkansas	David Pryor	Democratic	1974	Incumbent retired. New governor elected. Democratic hold.	✓ Bill Clinton (Democratic) 63.4%; Lynn Lowe (Republican) 36.6%
California	Jerry Brown	Democratic	1974	Incumbent re-elected.	✓ Jerry Brown (Democratic) 56.1%; Evelle J. Younger (Republican) 36.5%; Ed Clark (Independent) 5.5%; Marilyn Seals (PF) 1.0%; Theresa F. Dietrich (AI) 1.0%
Colorado	Richard Lamm	Democratic	1974	Incumbent re-elected.	✓ Richard Lamm (Democratic) 58.8%; Ted L. Strickland (Republican) 38.5%; Roy Peister (Tea) 1.7%; Elsa Blum (Socialist Workers) 0.4%; Sal Mandor (Independent) 0.3%; Earl Dodge (Prohibition) 0.3%
Connecticut	Ella Grasso	Democratic	1974	Incumbent re-elected.	✓ Ella Grasso (Democratic) 59.1%; Ronald A. Sarasin (Republican) 40.7%
Florida	Reubin Askew	Democratic	1970	Incumbent term-limited. New governor elected. Democratic hold.	✓ Bob Graham (Democratic) 55.6%; Jack Eckerd (Republican) 44.4%
Georgia	George Busbee	Democratic	1974	Incumbent re-elected.	✓ George Busbee (Democratic) 80.7%; Rodney M. Cook (Republican) 19.3%
Hawaii	George Ariyoshi	Democratic	1974	Incumbent re-elected.	✓ George Ariyoshi (Democratic) 54.5%; John R. Leopold (Republican) 44.3%; Alema Leota (non-partisan) 0.7%; Gregory Reeser (Libertarian) 0.4%; John Moore (Aloha Democratic) 0.2%
Idaho	John Evans	Democratic	1978 (Note: Evans took office after his predecessor (Cecil Andrus) resigned.)	Incumbent elected to full term.	✓ John Evans (Democratic) 58.8%; Allan Larsen (Republican) 39.6%; Wayne Loveless (American) 1.7%
Illinois	James R. Thompson	Republican	1976	Incumbent re-elected.	✓ James R. Thompson (Republican) 59.0%; Michael Bakalis (Democratic) 40.1%; Georgia Shields (Libertarian) 0.4%; Cecil Lampkin (Socialist Workers) 0.4%; Melvin Klenetsky (U.S. Labor) 0.2%
Iowa	Robert D. Ray	Republican	1968	Incumbent re-elected.	✓ Robert D. Ray (Republican) 58.3%; Jerome D. Fitzgerald (Democratic) 41.0%; John Ball (Libertarian) 0.5%; Joseph Grant (Socialist) 0.2%
Kansas	Robert F. Bennett	Republican	1974	Incumbent lost re-election. New governor elected. Democratic gain.	✓ John W. Carlin (Democratic) 49.4%; Robert Frederick Bennett (Republican) 47.3%; Frank W. Shelton Jr. (American) 2.3%; Berry Beets (Prohibition) 1.0%
Maine	James B. Longley	Independent	1974	Incumbent retired. New governor elected. Democratic gain.	✓ Joseph E. Brennan (Democratic) 47.7%; Linwood E. Palmer Jr. (Republican) 34.3%; Herman Franklin (Independent) 17.8%; James B. Longley (write-in) 0.2%
Maryland	Marvin Mandel (Blair Lee III, acting governor)	Democratic	1969 (special)	Incumbent term-limited. New governor elected. Democratic hold.	✓ Harry Hughes (Democratic) 70.6%; J. Glenn Beall Jr. (Republican) 29.4%
Massachusetts	Michael Dukakis	Democratic	1974	Incumbent lost re-nomination. New governor elected. Democratic hold.	✓ Edward J. King (Democratic) 52.5%; Francis W. Hatch Jr. (Republican) 47.2%
Michigan	William Milliken	Republican	1969 (Note: Milliken took office after his predecessor (George W. Romney) resigned.)	Incumbent re-elected.	✓ William Milliken (Republican) 56.8%; William B. Fitzgerald Jr. (Democratic) 43.2%
Minnesota	Rudy Perpich	Democratic	1976 (Note: Perpich took office after his predecessor (Wendell R. Anderson) resigned.)	Incumbent lost election to full term. New governor elected. Republican gain.	✓ Al Quie (Republican) 52.3%; Rudy Perpich (Democratic) 45.3%; Richard Pedersen (American) 1.3%; Jill Lakowske (Socialist Workers) 0.4%; Tom McDonald (Honest Government) 0.3%; Robin E. Miller (Libertarian) 0.2%; Edwin C. Pommerening (Savings Account) 0.1%
Nebraska	J. James Exon	Democratic	1970	Incumbent term-limited. New governor elected. Republican gain.	✓ Charles Thone (Republican) 56.0%; Gerald Whelan (Democratic) 44.0%
Nevada	Mike O'Callaghan	Democratic	1970	Incumbent term-limited. New governor elected. Republican gain.	✓ Robert List (Republican) 56.2%; Robert E. Rose (Democratic) 39.7%; Thomas F. Jefferson (Ind. American) 1.7%; None of These Candidates1.7%; John W. Grayson Jr. (Libertarian) 0.8%
New Hampshire	Meldrim Thomson Jr.	Republican	1972	Incumbent lost re-election. New governor elected. Democratic gain.	✓ Hugh Gallen (Democratic) 49.4%; Meldrim Thomson Jr. (Republican) 45.4%; Wesley Powell (Independent) 4.6%; Mabel Everett (Libertarian) 0.4%; Ralph Brewster (Independent) 0.2%
New Mexico	Jerry Apodaca	Democratic	1974	Incumbent term-limited. New governor elected. Democratic hold.	✓ Bruce King (Democratic) 50.5%; Joe Skeen (Republican) 49.4%
New York	Hugh Carey	Democratic	1974	Incumbent re-elected.	✓ Hugh Carey (Democratic) 50.9%; Perry B. Duryea Jr. (Republican) 45.2%; Mary Jane Tobin (Right to Life) 2.7%; Gary Greenberg (Libertarian) 0.4%; Dianne M. Feeley (Socialist Workers) 0.3%; Jarvis Tyner (Communist) 0.2%; Paul Gallagher (U.S. Labor) 0.2%
Ohio	Jim Rhodes	Republican	1962; 1970 (term-limited); 1974	Incumbent re-elected.	✓ Jim Rhodes (Republican) 49.3%; Dick Celeste (Democratic) 47.6% Patricia H. Wright (Independent) 1.2% John O'Neill (Independent) 1.0% Allan Friedman (Independent) 0.8%
Oklahoma	David Boren	Democratic	1970	Incumbent retired. New governor elected. Democratic hold.	✓ George Nigh (Democratic) 51.7%; Ron Shotts (Republican) 47.2%; Billy Joe Clegg (Independent) 0.5%; Floyd Sheally (Independent) 0.3%; Jim McCuiston (Independent) 0.2%
Oregon	Robert W. Straub	Democratic	1974	Incumbent lost re-election. New governor elected. Republican gain.	✓ Victor Atiyeh (Republican) 54.9%; Robert W. Straub (Democratic) 45.1%
Pennsylvania	Milton Shapp	Democratic	1970	Incumbent term-limited. New governor elected. Republican gain.	✓ Dick Thornburgh (Republican) 52.5%; Peter F. Flaherty (Democratic) 46.4%; Mark Zola (Socialist Workers) 0.5%; Lee Frissell (Consumer) 0.5%
Rhode Island	J. Joseph Garrahy	Democratic	1976	Incumbent re-elected.	✓ J. Joseph Garrahy (Democratic) 62.8%; Lincoln Almond (Republican) 30.7%; Joseph A. Doorley Jr. (Independent) 6.5%
South Carolina	James B. Edwards	Republican	1974	Incumbent term-limited. New governor elected. Democratic gain.	✓ Richard Riley (Democratic) 61.9%; Edward Lunn Young (Republican) 38.1%
South Dakota	Harvey L. Wollman	Democratic	1978 (Note: Wollman took office after his predecessor (Richard F. Kneip) resigned.)	Incumbent lost nomination. New governor elected. Republican gain.	✓ Bill Janklow (Republican) 56.6%; Roger D. McKellips (Democratic) 43.4%
Tennessee	Ray Blanton	Democratic	1974	Incumbent term-limited. New governor elected. Republican gain.	✓ Lamar Alexander (Republican) 55.8%; Jake Butcher (Democratic) 44.2%
Texas	Dolph Briscoe	Democratic	1972	Incumbent lost re-nomination. New governor elected. Republican gain.	✓ Bill Clements (Republican) 50.0%; John Hill (Democratic) 49.2%; Mario Compean (La Raza Unida) 0.6%; Sara Jean Johnston (Socialist Workers) 0.2%
Vermont	Richard A. Snelling	Republican	1972	Incumbent re-elected.	✓ Richard A. Snelling (Republican) 62.8%; Edwin C. Granai (Democratic) 34.1%; Earl S. Gardner (Liberty Union) 2.9%
Wisconsin	Martin J. Schreiber	Democratic	1977 (Note: Schreiber took office after his predecessor (Patrick Lucey) resigned.)	Incumbent lost election to full term. New governor elected. Republican gain.	✓ Lee S. Dreyfus (Republican) 54.4%; Martin J. Schreiber (Democratic) 44.9%; Eugene R. Zimmerman (Constitution) 0.4%; John C. Doherty (Independent) 0.1%; Adrienne Kaplan (Socialist Workers) 0.1%; Henry A. Ochsner (Socialist Labor) 0.1%
Wyoming	Edgar Herschler	Democratic	1974	Incumbent re-elected.	✓ Edgar Herschler (Democratic) 50.9%; John C. Ostlund (Republican) 49.1%

=== Territories and federal district ===
Territory	Incumbent	Party	First elected	Result	Candidates
District of Columbia	Walter Washington	Democratic	1974	Incumbent lost renomination. New mayor elected. Democratic hold.	✓ Marion Barry (Democratic) 70.2%; Arthur Fletcher (Republican) 28.1%; Susan Pennington (U.S. Labor) 1.1%
Guam	Ricardo Bordallo	Democratic	1974	Incumbent lost re-election. New governor elected. Republican gain.	✓ Paul M. Calvo (Republican) 52.1%; Ricardo Bordallo (Democratic) 47.9%
U.S. Virgin Island	Juan Francisco Luis	ICM	1978 (Note: Luis took office after his predecessor (Cyril E. King) died.)	Incumbent elected to full term.	✓ Juan Francisco Luis (ICM) 59.19%; Ron de Lugo (Democratic) 40.81%

== Close states ==
States where the margin of victory was under 1%:

1. Texas, 0.8%

States where the margin of victory was under 5%:

1. New Mexico, 1.1%
2. Ohio, 1.7%
3. Wyoming, 1.8%
4. Kansas, 2.1%
5. New Hampshire, 4.0%
6. Guam, 4.2%
7. Oklahoma, 4.5%

States where the margin of victory was under 10%:

1. Massachusetts, 5.3%
2. New York, 5.7%
3. Pennsylvania, 6.1%
4. Minnesota, 7.0%
5. Arizona, 7.7%
6. Wisconsin, 9.5%
7. Oregon, 9.8%

== Alabama ==
1978 Alabama gubernatorial election
- November 7, 1978
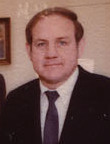

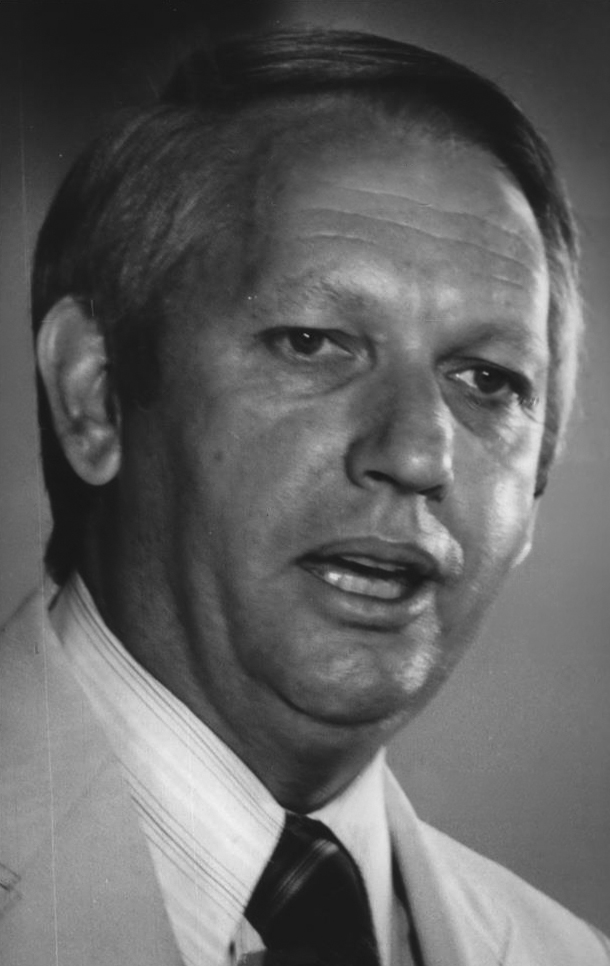
Nominee	Fob James	H. Guy Hunt
Party	Democratic	Republican
Popular vote	551,786	196,963
Percentage	72.6%	25.9%
- County results James: 40–50% 50–60% 60–70% 70–80% 80–90% >90% Hunt: 50–60% 60–70%
Governor before election
George Wallace
Democratic
Elected Governor
Fob James
Democratic

The 1978 Alabama gubernatorial election took place on November 7, 1978, to elect the governor of Alabama. Fob James, a businessman who had switched from the Republican Party to the Democratic Party and campaigned as a "born-again Democrat", won the Democratic primary in an upset over Attorney General Bill Baxley. He went on to defeat Guy Hunt in a landslide in the general election. Incumbent Democrat George Wallace was term limited and could not seek a third consecutive term; he later successfully ran again in 1982.

== Alaska ==
1978 Alaska gubernatorial election
- November 7, 1978
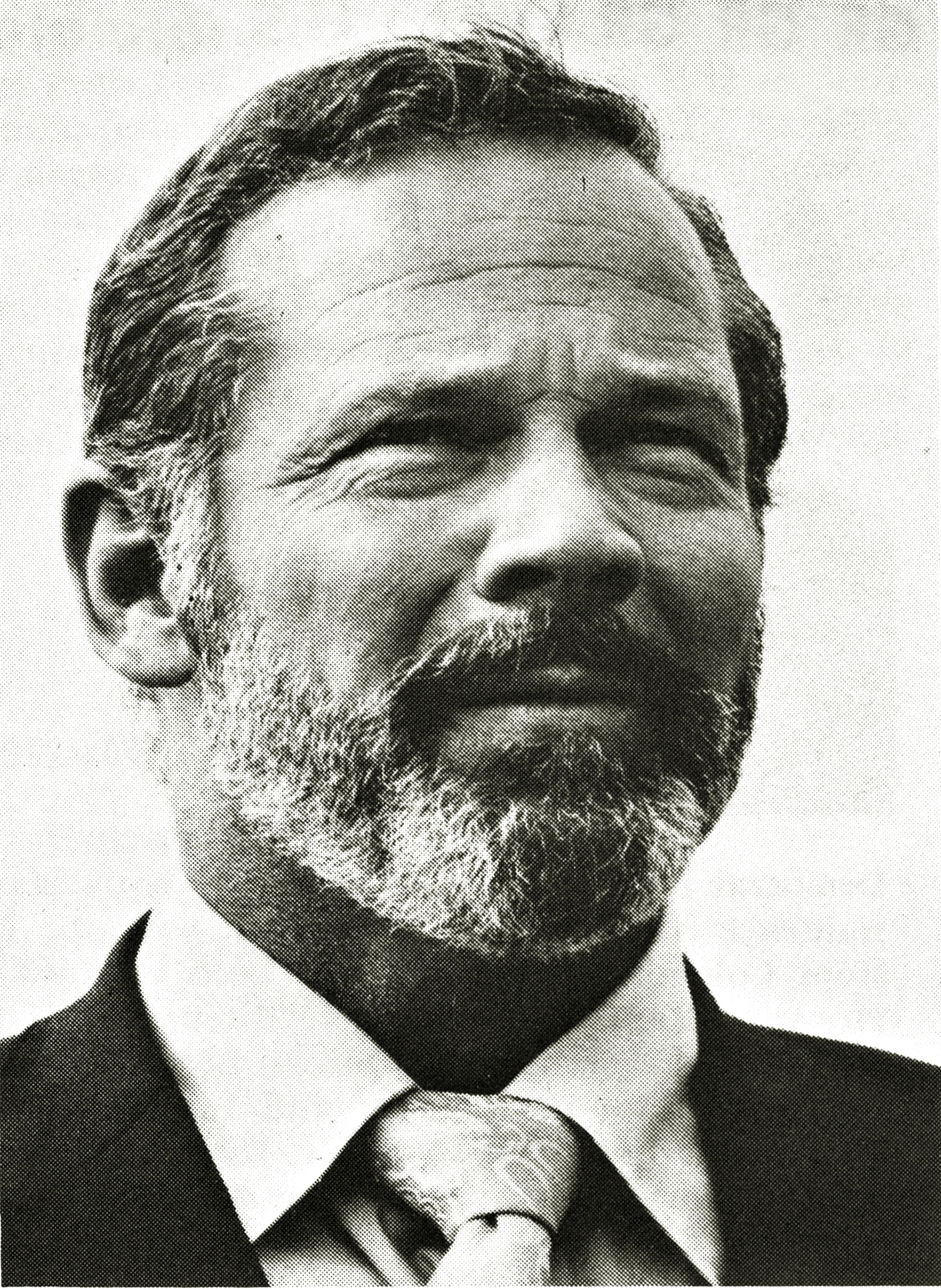

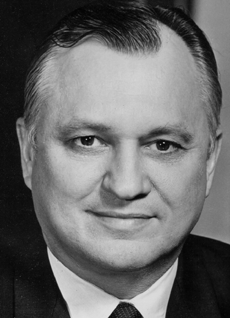

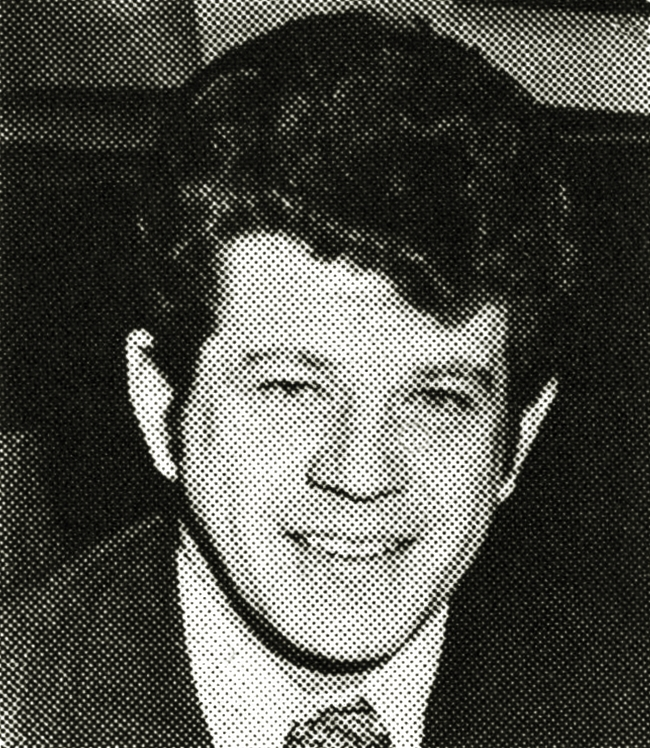

Nominee	Jay Hammond	Wally Hickel
Party	Republican	Write-In
Running mate	Terry Miller	None
Popular vote	49,580	33,555
Percentage	39.07%	26.44%
Nominee	Chancy Croft	Tom Kelly
Party	Democratic	Independent
Running mate	Katie Hurley	Kathryn Poland
Popular vote	25,656	15,656
Percentage	20.22%	12.34%
- Results by state house district Hammond: 30–40% 40–50% 50–60% Hickel: 30–40% Croft: 30–40%
Governor before election
Jay Hammond
Republican
Elected Governor
Jay Hammond
Republican

The 1978 Alaska gubernatorial election took place on November 7, 1978, to elect the governor of Alaska. Republican incumbent Jay Hammond defeated four opponents: former Governor of Alaska and write-in candidate Wally Hickel, Alaska Senator and Democratic nominee Chancy Croft, former Commissioner of Natural Resources and Independent candidate Tom Kelly and Alaskan Independence Party nominee Don Wright. After losing to Hammond in the Republican primary, Hickel ran as a write-in candidate and was able to outperform Croft. Republican Tom Fink and Democrat Jay Kerttula also ran in the open primary.

This was the first time an incumbent Republican governor was re-elected for a second term, and this would not occur again until 2022.

== Arizona ==
1978 Arizona gubernatorial election
- November 7, 1978
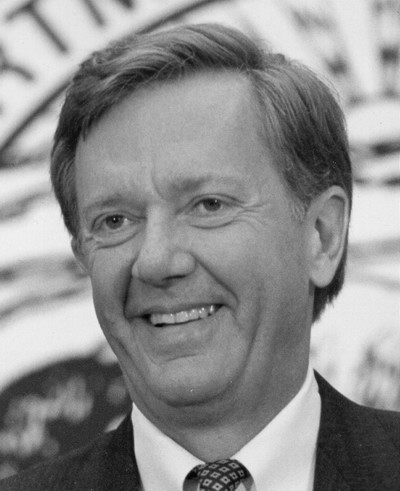

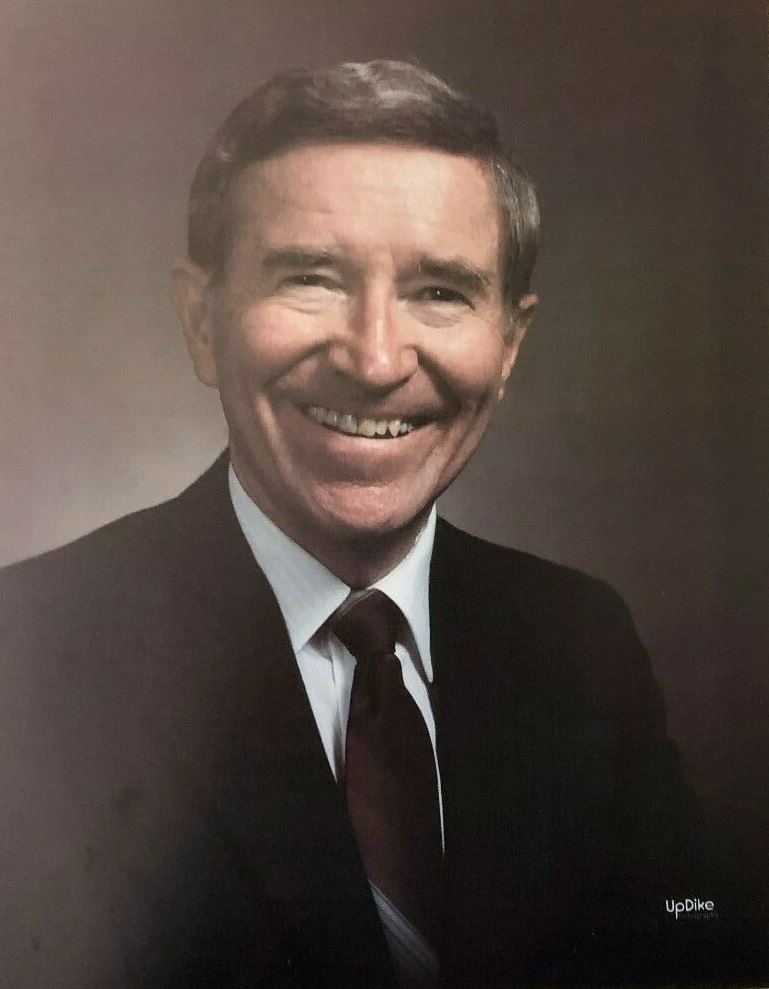
Nominee	Bruce Babbitt	Evan Mecham
Party	Democratic	Republican
Popular vote	282,605	241,093
Percentage	52.5%	44.8%
- County results Babbitt: 50–60% 60–70% Mecham: 40–50% 50–60%
Governor before election
Bruce Babbitt
Democratic
Elected Governor
Bruce Babbitt
Democratic

The 1978 Arizona gubernatorial election took place on November 7, 1978, for the post of Governor of Arizona. Democrat Bruce Babbitt defeated Republican nominee Evan Mecham. Babbitt was the former Attorney General of Arizona, but after the death of Governor Wesley Bolin, Babbit became governor. Bolin himself ascended to office from the position of Secretary of State, meaning his replacement, Rose Mofford was not eligible to the office as she was not elected. This drama of exchanging office would continue after Babbitt's term came to an end, as Mofford would become governor and succeeded Evan Mecham, Babbitt's challenger, in 1988.

== Arkansas ==
1978 Arkansas gubernatorial election
- November 7, 1978
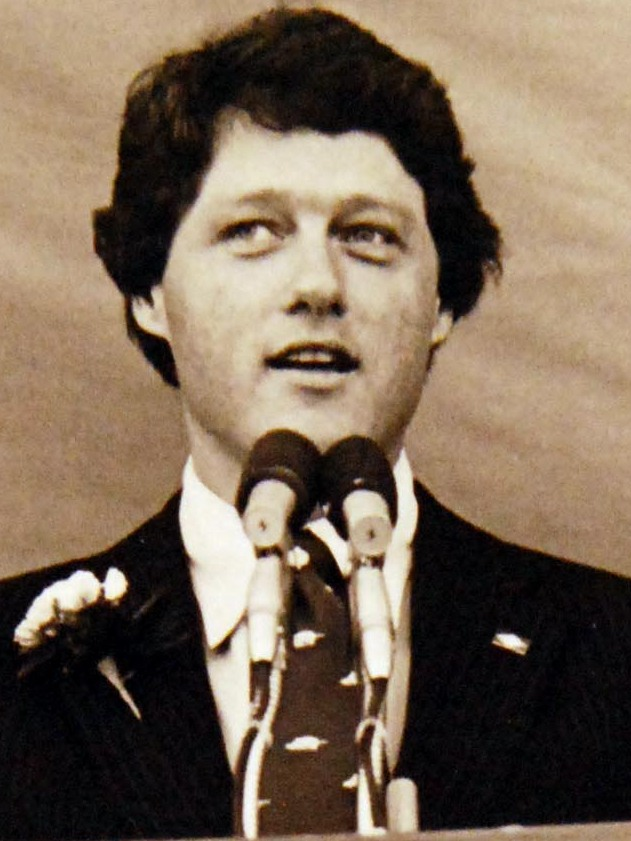

Nominee	Bill Clinton	Lynn Lowe
Party	Democratic	Republican
Popular vote	335,101	193,746
Percentage	63.36%	36.64%
- County results Clinton: 50–60% 60–70% 70–80% 80–90% Lowe: 50–60% 60–70%
Governor before election
David Pryor
Democratic
Elected Governor
Bill Clinton
Democratic

The 1978 Arkansas gubernatorial election, held on November 7, was the first time that future president Bill Clinton was elected Governor of Arkansas.

== California ==
1978 California gubernatorial election
- November 7, 1978
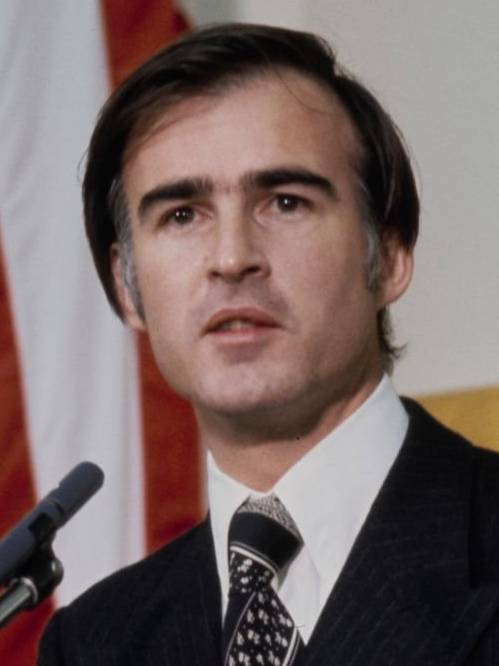

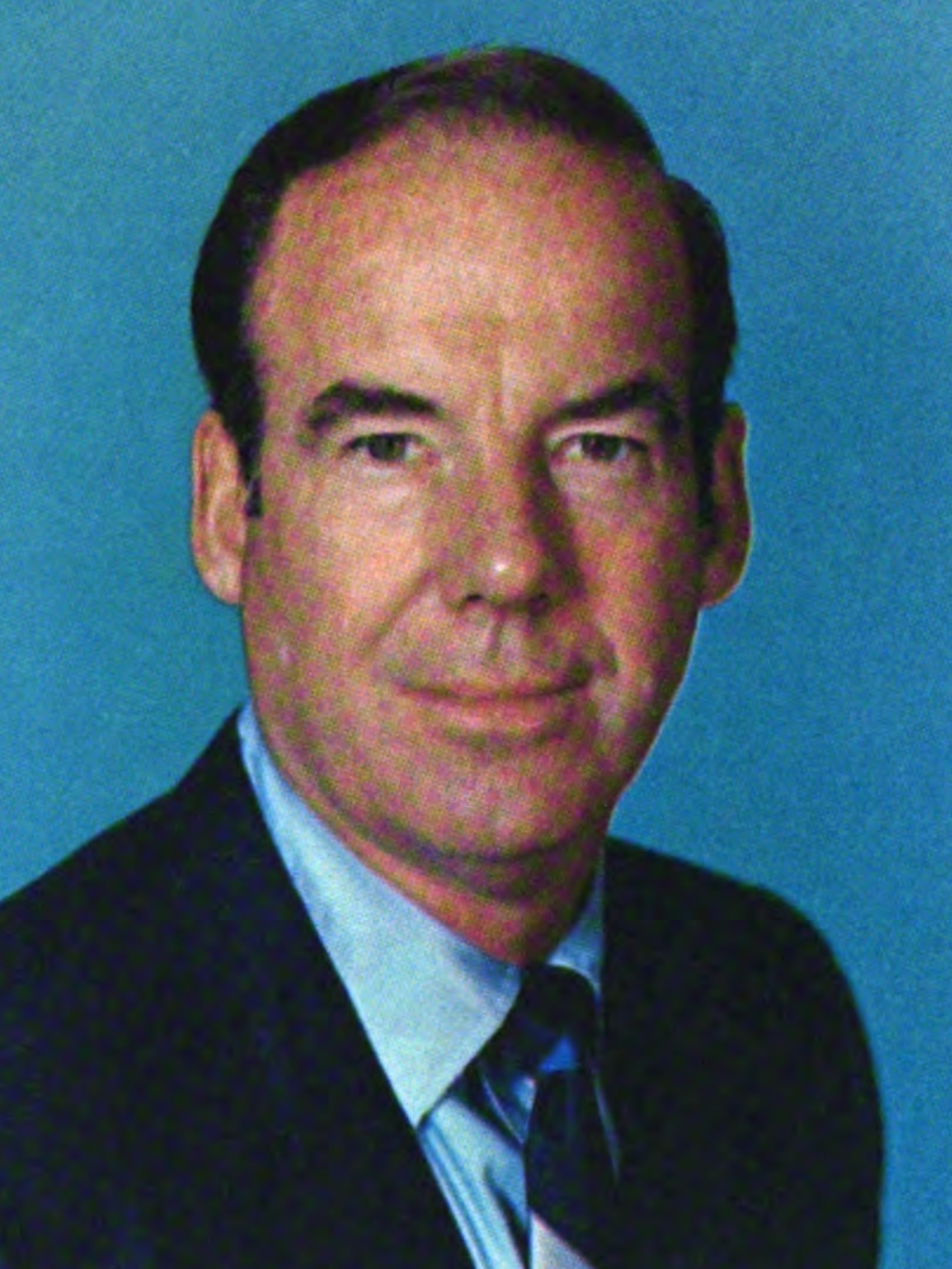

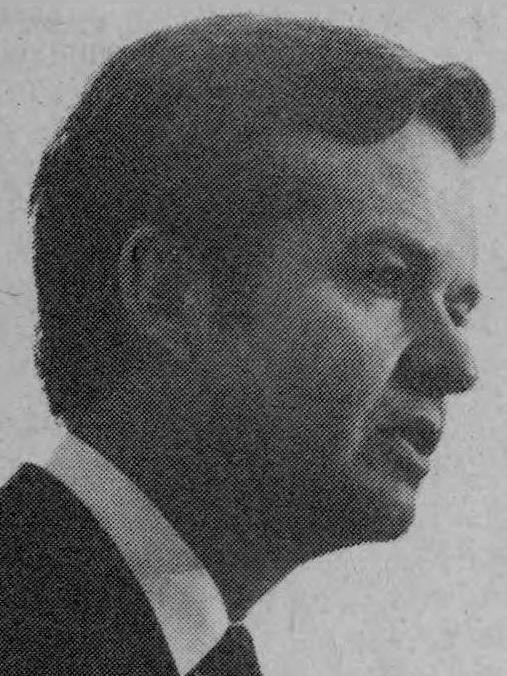
Nominee	Jerry Brown	Evelle Younger	Ed Clark
Party	Democratic	Republican	Independent
Popular vote	3,878,812	2,526,534	377,960
Percentage	56.05%	36.50%	5.46%
- Brown: 40–50% 50–60% 60–70% 70–80% 80–90% Younger: 40–50% 50–60%
Governor before election
Jerry Brown
Democratic
Elected Governor
Jerry Brown
Democratic

The 1978 California gubernatorial election occurred on November 7, 1978. The Democratic incumbent, Jerry Brown, defeated the Republican nominee Attorney General Evelle J. Younger and independent candidate Ed Clark in a landslide.

== Colorado ==
1978 Colorado gubernatorial election
- November 7, 1978
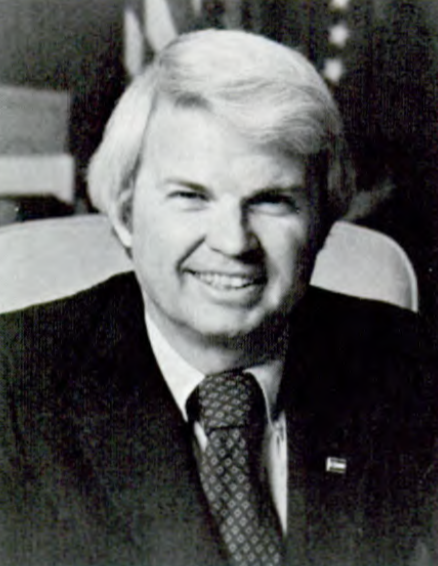

Nominee	Richard Lamm	Ted L. Strickland
Party	Democratic	Republican
Running mate	Nancy Dick	Hank Brown
Popular vote	483,985	317,292
Percentage	58.76%	38.53%
- County results Lamm: 40–50% 50–60% 60–70% 70–80% Strickland: 40–50% 50–60%
Governor before election
Richard Lamm
Democratic
Elected Governor
Richard Lamm
Democratic

The 1978 Colorado gubernatorial election was held on November 7, 1978. Incumbent Democrat Richard Lamm defeated Republican nominee Ted L. Strickland with 58.76% of the vote.

== Connecticut ==
1978 Connecticut gubernatorial election
- November 7, 1978
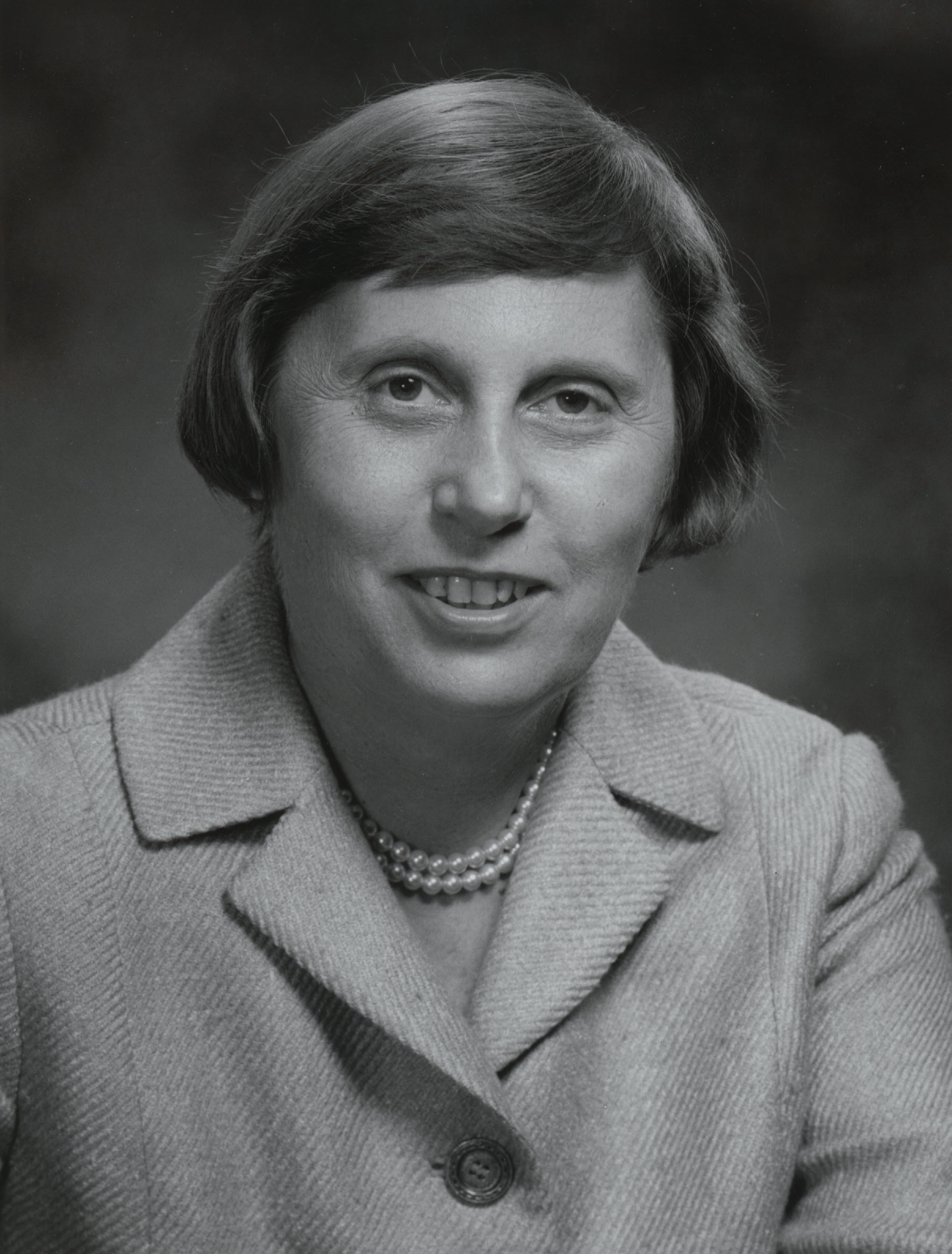

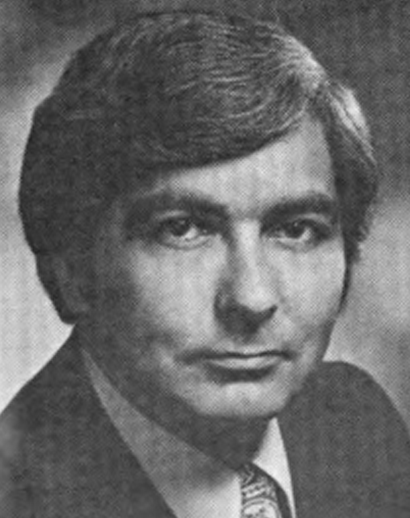
Nominee	Ella Grasso	Ronald Sarasin
Party	Democratic	Republican
Running mate	Bill O'Neill	Lewis Rome
Popular vote	613,109	422,316
Percentage	59.15%	40.74%
- Grasso: 50–60% 60–70% 70–80% Moffett: 50–60% 60–70%
Governor before election
Ella Grasso
Democratic
Elected Governor
Ella Grasso
Democratic

The 1978 Connecticut gubernatorial election was held on Tuesday November 7, to elect Governor of Connecticut, Incumbent Governor Ella Grasso and running mate William A. O'Neill defeated Republican candidate Ronald A. Sarasin and running mate Lewis Rome with 59.15% of the vote.

== Florida ==
1978 Florida gubernatorial election
- November 7, 1978
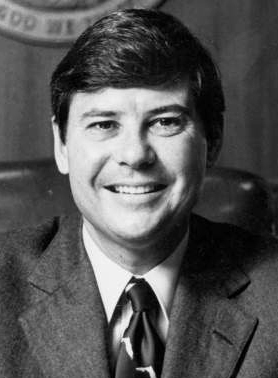

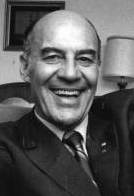
Nominee	Bob Graham	Jack Eckerd
Party	Democratic	Republican
Running mate	Wayne Mixson	Paula Hawkins
Popular vote	1,406,580	1,123,888
Percentage	55.59%	44.41%
- County results Graham: 50–60% 60–70% 70–80% 80–90% Eckerd: 50-60% 60-70%
Governor before election
Reubin Askew
Democratic
Elected Governor
Bob Graham
Democratic

The 1978 Florida gubernatorial election was held on November 7, 1978. Democratic nominee Bob Graham was elected, defeating Republican nominee Jack Eckerd with 55.59% of the vote.

== Georgia ==
1978 Georgia gubernatorial election
- November 7, 1978
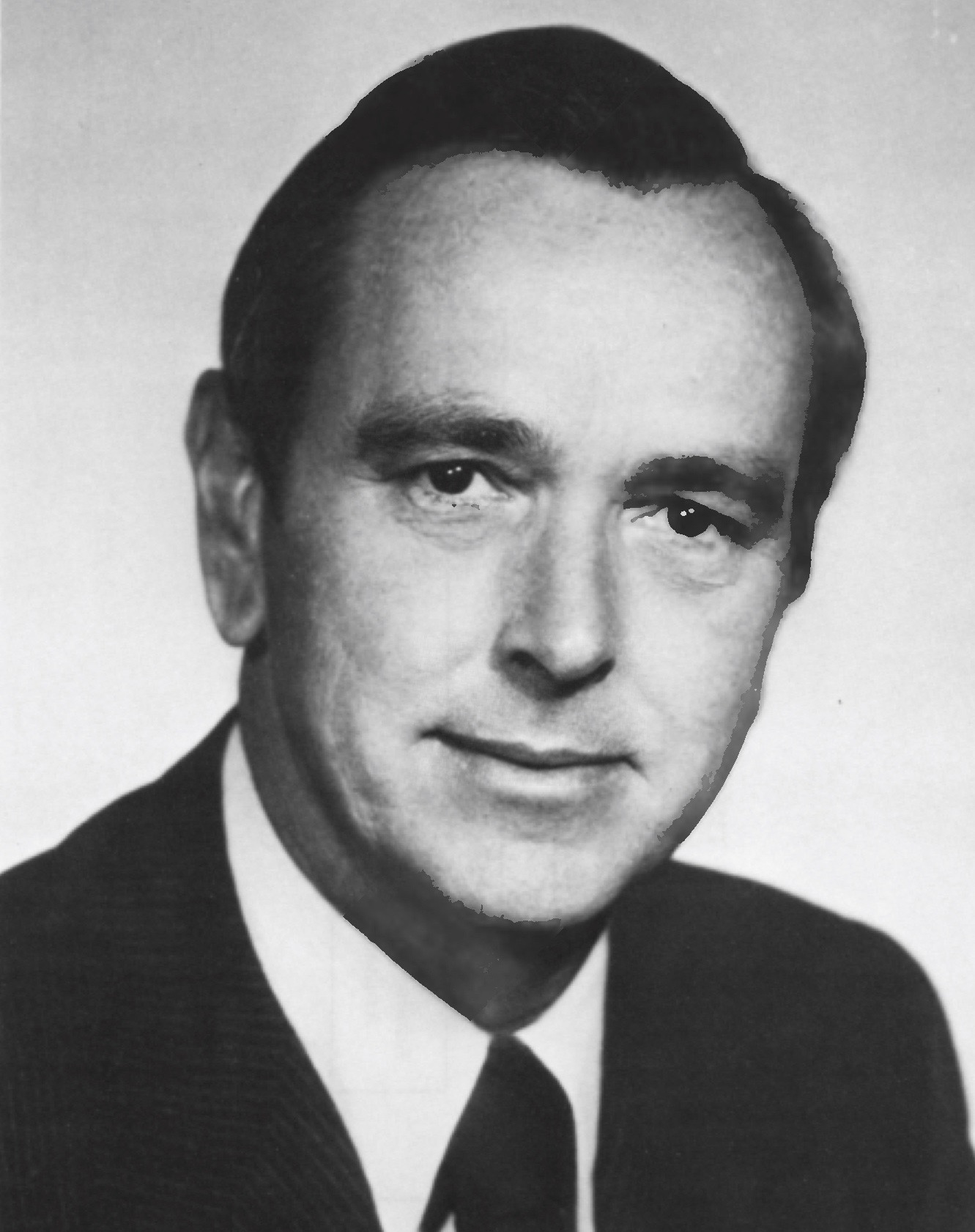

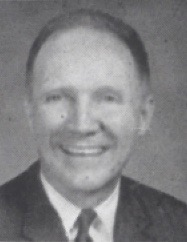
Nominee	George Busbee	Rodney Mims Cook Sr.
Party	Democratic	Republican
Popular vote	534,572	128,139
Percentage	80.7%	19.3%
- County results Busbee: 50–60% 70–80% 80–90% >90%
Governor before election
George Busbee
Democratic
Elected Governor
George Busbee
Democratic

The 1978 Georgia gubernatorial election was held on November 7, 1978. George Busbee was re-elected, the first time a Governor of Georgia was re-elected for a second four-year term under the amendment made to the constitution in 1976 and the first time overall after serving a complete first four-year term.

== Hawaii ==
1978 Hawaii gubernatorial election
- November 7, 1978
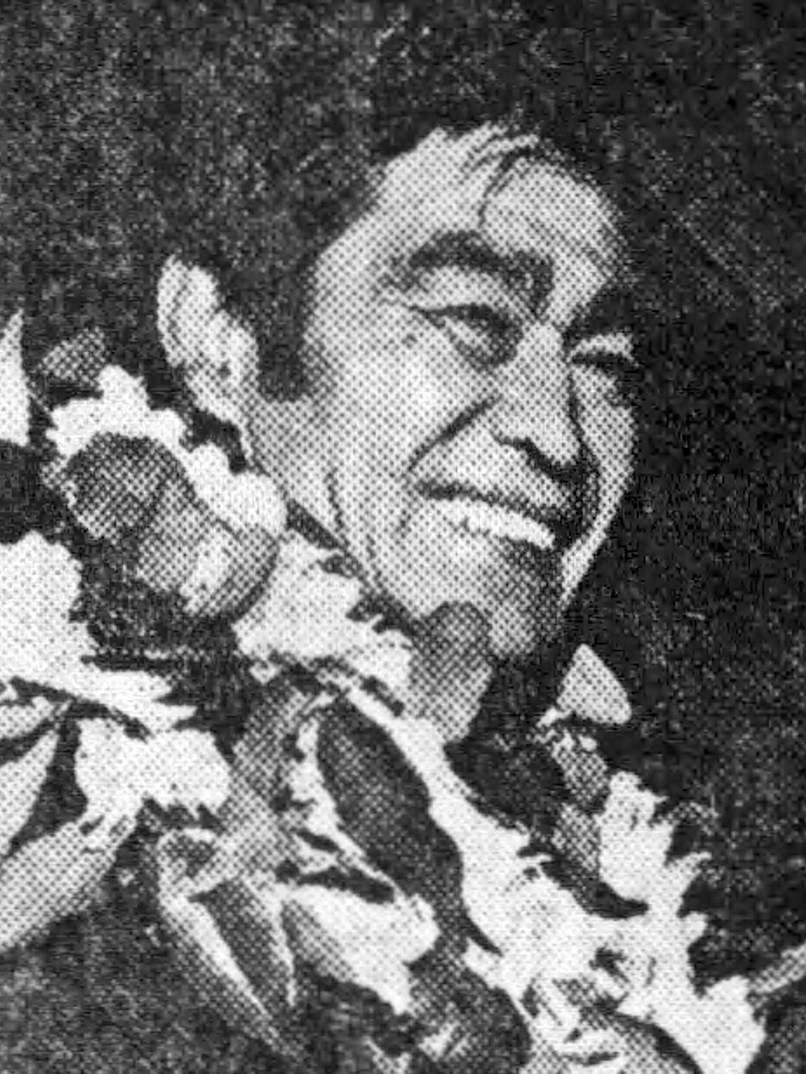

Nominee	George Ariyoshi	John Leopold
Party	Democratic	Republican
Running mate	Jean King	Virginia Isbell
Popular vote	153,394	124,610
Percentage	54.5%	44.3%
- County results Ariyoshi: 50–60% 60–70% 70–80%
Governor before election
George Ariyoshi
Democratic
Elected Governor
George Ariyoshi
Democratic

The 1978 Hawaii gubernatorial election was Hawaii's sixth gubernatorial election. The election was held on November 7, 1978, and resulted in a victory for the Democratic candidate, Governor George Ariyoshi over Republican candidate, State Senator John R. Leopold and three other candidates. Ariyoshi received more votes than any other candidate in every county in the state.

== Idaho ==
1978 Idaho gubernatorial election
- November 7, 1978
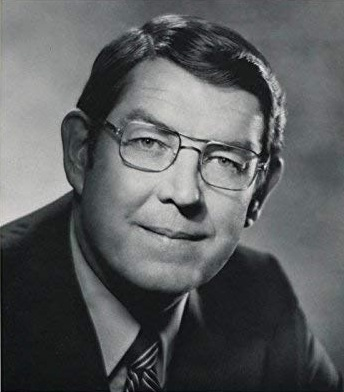

Nominee	John Evans	Allan Larsen
Party	Democratic	Republican
Popular vote	169,540	114,149
Percentage	58.75%	39.56%
- County results Evans: 50–60% 60–70% 70–80% Larsen: 50–60% 60–70% 70–80%
Governor before election
John Evans
Democratic
Elected Governor
John V. Evans
Democratic

The 1978 Idaho gubernatorial election was held on Tuesday, November 7, and incumbent Democrat John Evans defeated Republican nominee Allan Larsen with 58.75% of the vote.

== Illinois ==
1978 Illinois gubernatorial election
- November 7, 1978
- Turnout: 54.23% ▼19.95 pp
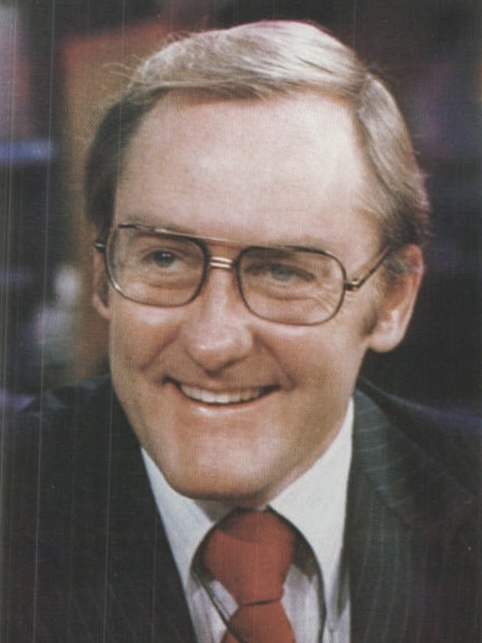

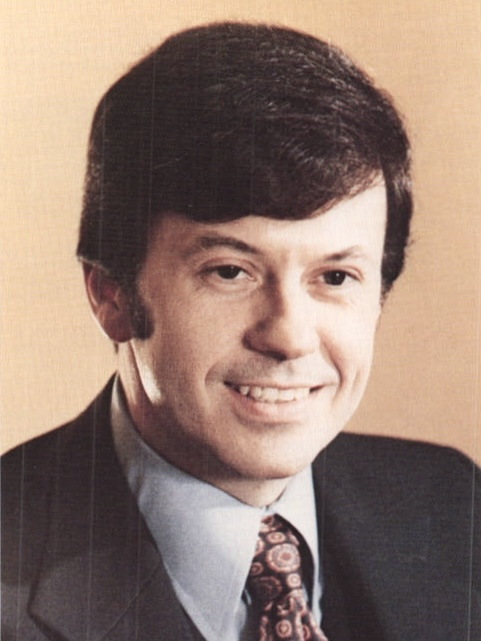
Nominee	Jim Thompson	Michael Bakalis
Party	Republican	Democratic
Running mate	Dave O'Neal	Dick Durbin
Popular vote	1,859,684	1,263,134
Percentage	59.04%	40.10%
- County results Thompson: 50-60% 60-70% 70-80% Bakalis: 40–50% 50–60%
Governor before election
James R. Thompson
Republican
Elected Governor
James R. Thompson
Republican

The 1978 Illinois gubernatorial election was held on Tuesday, November 7, 1978. Republican James R. Thompson easily won a second term in office, defeating Democratic nominee Michael Bakalis by nearly 600,000 votes.

== Iowa ==
1978 Iowa gubernatorial election
- November 7, 1978
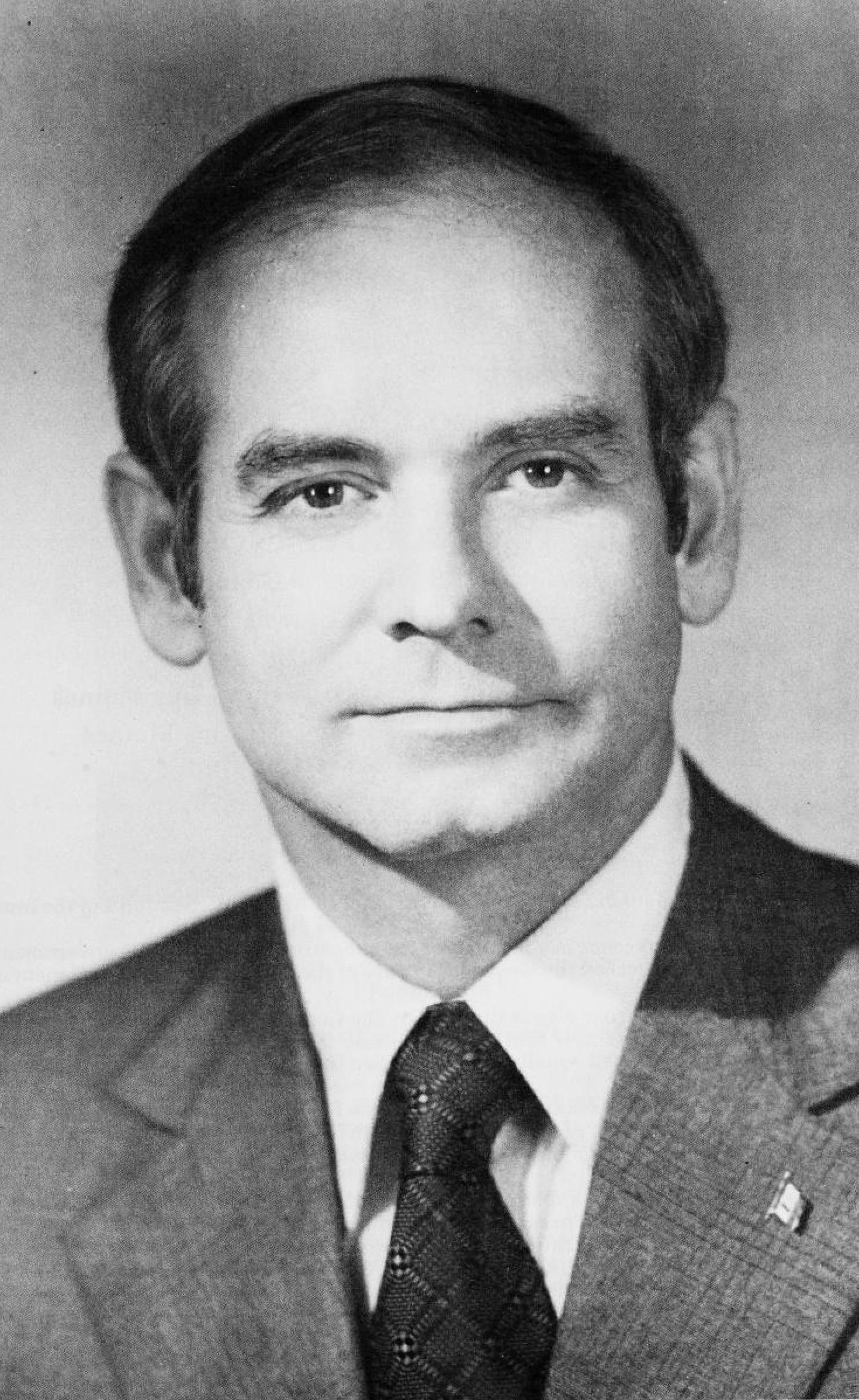

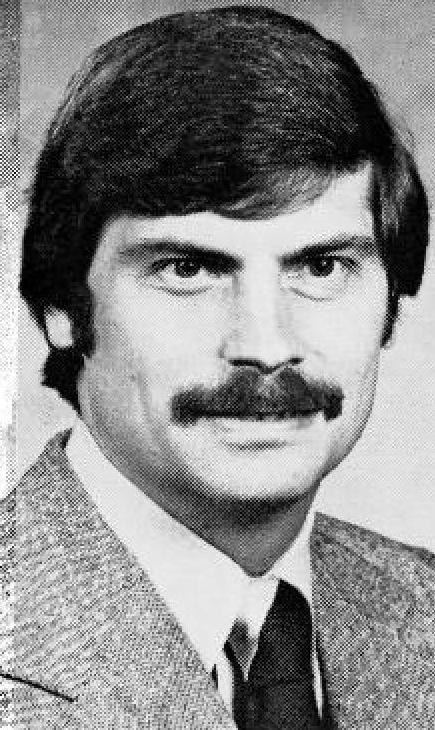
Nominee	Robert D. Ray	Jerome D. Fitzgerald
Party	Republican	Democratic
Popular vote	491,713	345,519
Percentage	58.3%	41.0%
- County results Ray: 50–60% 60–70% 70–80% Fitzgerald: 50–60%
Governor before election
Robert D. Ray
Republican
Elected Governor
Robert D. Ray
Republican

The 1978 Iowa gubernatorial election was held on November 7, 1978. Incumbent Republican Robert D. Ray defeated Democratic nominee Jerome D. Fitzgerald with 58.32% of the vote.

== Kansas ==
1978 Kansas gubernatorial election
- November 7, 1978
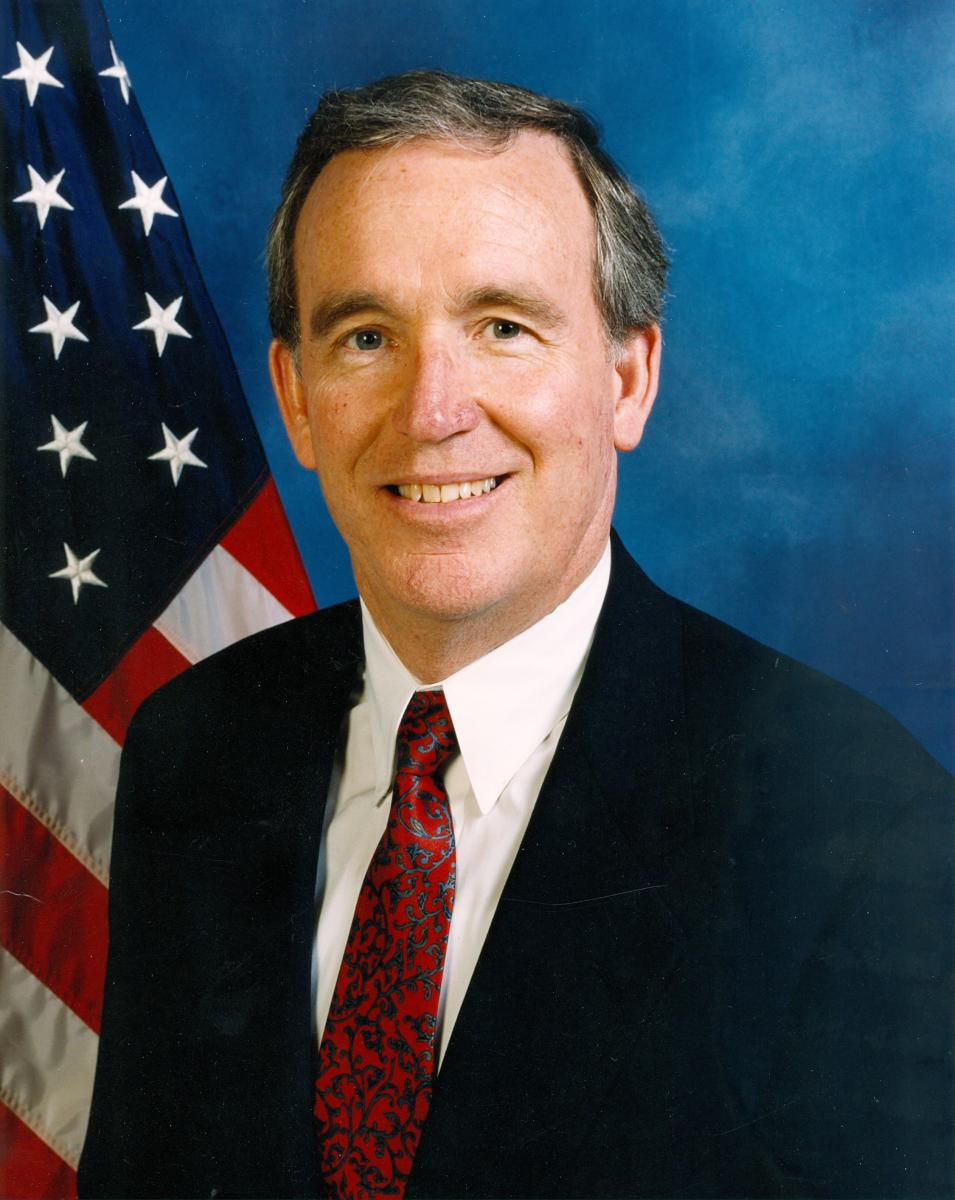

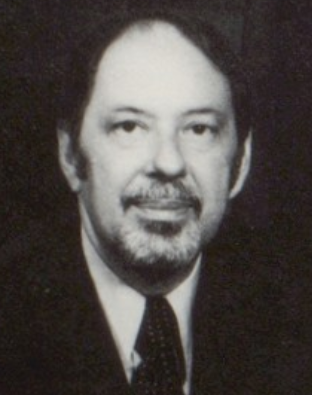
Nominee	John W. Carlin	Robert F. Bennett
Party	Democratic	Republican
Running mate	Paul Dugan	Larry Montgomery
Popular vote	363,835	348,015
Percentage	49.4%	47.3%
- County results Carlin: 40–50% 50–60% 60–70% Bennett: 40–50% 50–60% 60–70%
Governor before election
Robert Frederick Bennett
Republican
Elected Governor
John W. Carlin
Democratic

The 1978 Kansas gubernatorial election was held on November 7, 1978. Democratic nominee John W. Carlin defeated incumbent Republican Robert Frederick Bennett with 49.4% of the vote.

== Maine ==
1978 Maine gubernatorial election
- November 7, 1978
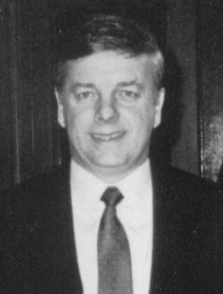

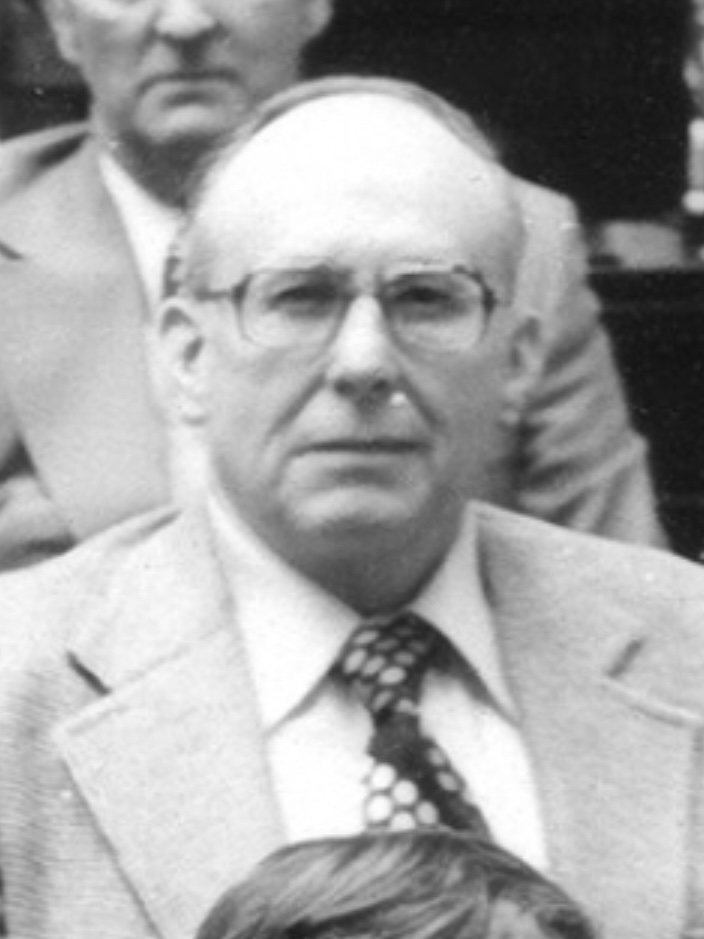

Nominee	Joseph Brennan	Linwood E. Palmer Jr.	Herman C. Frankland
Party	Democratic	Republican	Independent
Popular vote	176,493	126,862	65,889
Percentage	47.8%	34.4%	17.8%
- County results Brennan: 40–50% 50–60% Palmer: 30–40% 40–50% 50–60%
Governor before election
James B. Longley
Independent
Elected Governor
Joseph Brennan
Democratic

The 1978 Maine gubernatorial election took place on November 7, 1978. Incumbent Independent Governor James B. Longley had promised to not seek a second term when he was elected in 1974, and held true to his pledge. Former State Senator Joseph E. Brennan of the Democratic Party defeated both challenger Republican Linwood E. Palmer Jr. and right-wing independent candidate Herman Frankland. Richard Carey unsuccessfully ran for the Democratic nomination, while Charles Cragin unsuccessfully ran for the Republican nomination.

== Maryland ==
1978 Maryland gubernatorial election
- November 7, 1978
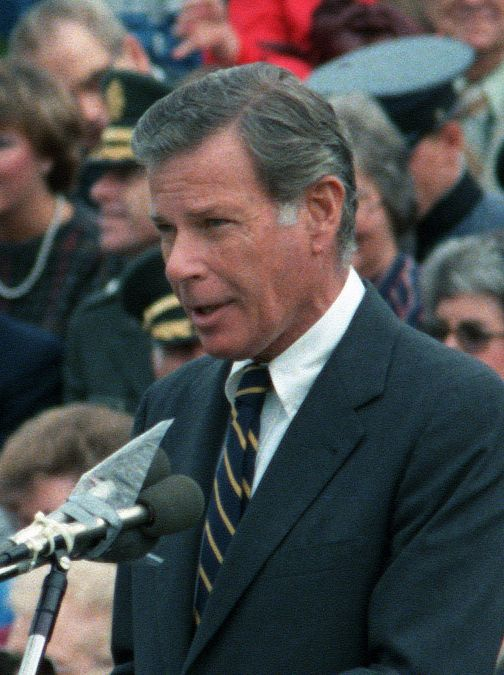

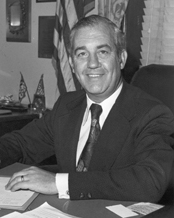
Nominee	Harry Hughes	John Glenn Beall Jr.
Party	Democratic	Republican
Running mate	Samuel Bogley	Aris T. Allen
Popular vote	705,910	293,635
Percentage	70.62%	29.38%
- County results Hughes: 50-60% 60-70% 70-80% 80–90% Beall: 50-60% 60-70%
Governor before election
Marvin Mandel
Democratic
Elected Governor
Harry Hughes
Democratic

The 1978 Maryland gubernatorial election was held on November 7, 1978. Democratic nominee Harry Hughes defeated Republican nominee John Glenn Beall Jr. with 70.62% of the vote.

== Massachusetts ==
1978 Massachusetts gubernatorial election
- November 7, 1978
- Turnout: 78.97% ▲4.33
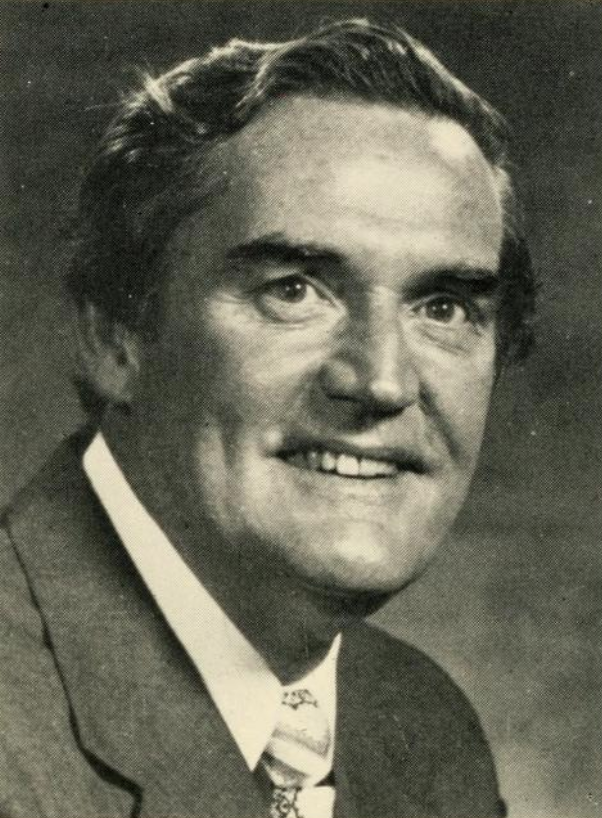

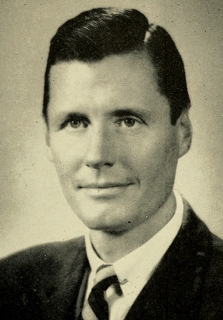
Nominee	Edward J. King	Francis W. Hatch Jr.
Party	Democratic	Republican
Running mate	Thomas O'Neill III	William I. Cowin
Popular vote	1,030,294	926,072
Percentage	52.51%	47.19%
- King: 50–60% 60–70% 70–80% Hatch: 40–50% 50–60% 60–70% 70–80% 80–90% Tie: 40–50%
Governor before election
Michael Dukakis
Democratic
Elected Governor
Edward J. King
Democratic

The 1978 Massachusetts gubernatorial election was held on November 7, 1978. Former Massachusetts Port Authority executive director Edward J. King was elected to a four-year term, from January 4, 1979, until January 6, 1983. King won the Democratic nomination by defeating incumbent governor of Massachusetts Michael Dukakis in the Democratic primary.

== Michigan ==
1978 Michigan gubernatorial election
- November 2, 1978
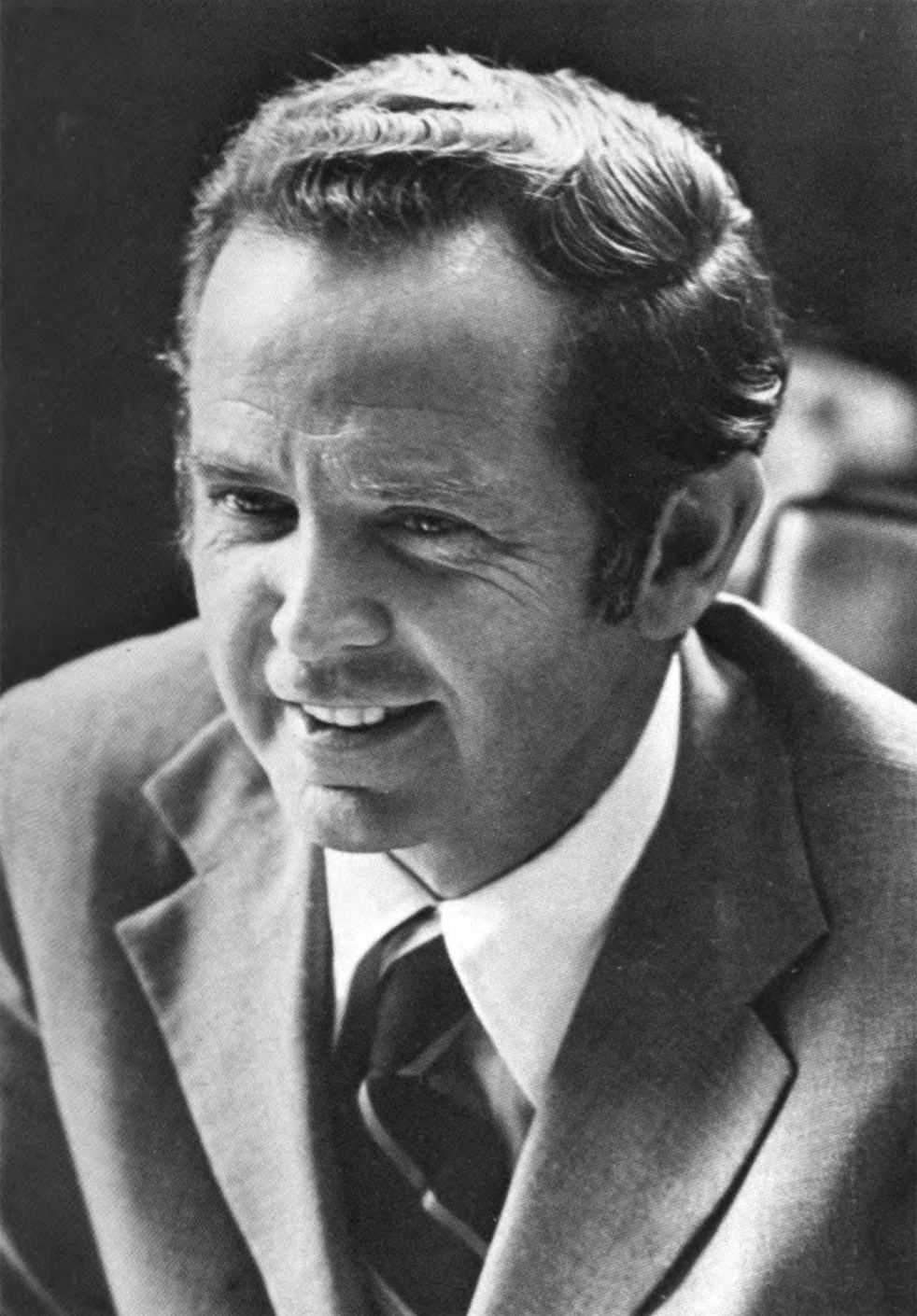

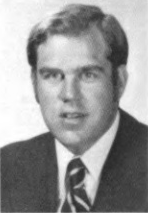
Nominee	William Milliken	William B. Fitzgerald Jr.
Party	Republican	Democratic
Popular vote	1,628,485	1,237,256
Percentage	56.8%	43.1%
- County results Milliken: 50–60% 60–70% 70-80% Fitzgerald: 40–50% 50–60% 60–70% 70–80%
Governor before election
William Milliken
Republican
Elected Governor
William Milliken
Republican

The 1978 Michigan gubernatorial election was held on November 7, 1978. Incumbent Republican William Milliken was elected to a third term as Michigan Governor.

== Minnesota ==
1978 Minnesota gubernatorial election
- November 7, 1978
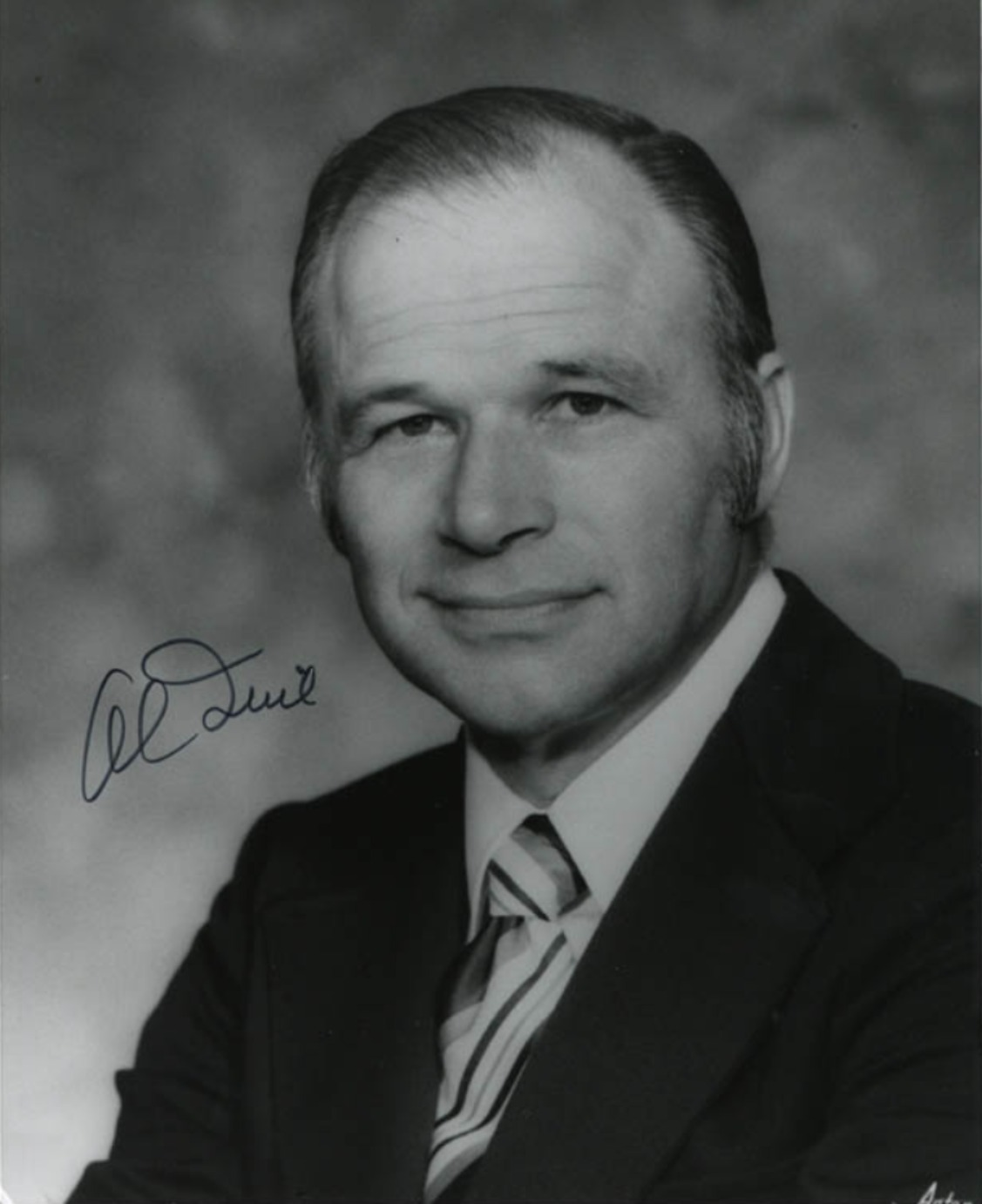

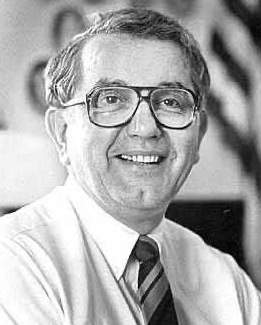
Nominee	Al Quie	Rudy Perpich
Party	Ind.-Republican	Democratic (DFL)
Running mate	Lou Wangberg	Alec Olson
Popular vote	830,019	718,244
Percentage	52.35%	45.30%
- County results Quie: 40–50% 50–60% 60–70% 70–80% Perpich: 40–50% 50–60% 60–70%
Governor before election
Rudy Perpich
Democratic (DFL)
Elected Governor
Al Quie
Ind.-Republican

The 1978 Minnesota gubernatorial election took place on November 7, 1978. Independent-Republican Party candidate U.S. House Rep Al Quie defeated Minnesota Democratic–Farmer–Labor Party incumbent Rudy Perpich.

== Nebraska ==
1978 Nebraska gubernatorial election
- November 7, 1978
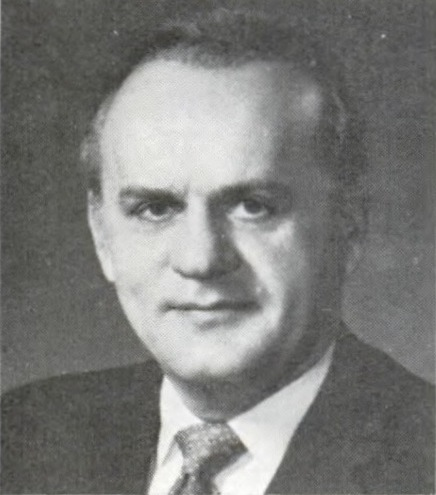

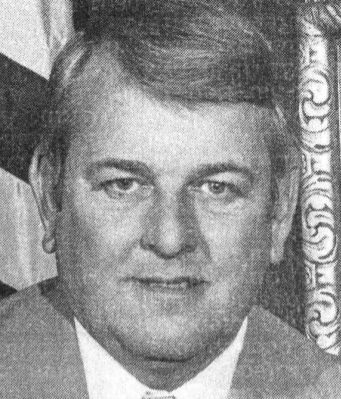
Nominee	Charles Thone	Gerald Whelan
Party	Republican	Democratic
Running mate	Roland Luedtke	Orval Keyes
Popular vote	275,473	216,754
Percentage	55.9%	44.0%
- County results Thone: 50–60% 60–70% 70–80% 80–90% Whelan: 50–60% 60–70%
Governor before election
J. James Exon
Democratic
Elected Governor
Charles Thone
Republican

The 1978 Nebraska gubernatorial election was held on November 7, 1978, and featured U.S. Representative Charles Thone, a Republican, defeating Democratic nominee, Lieutenant Governor Gerald Whelan. Incumbent Governor J. James Exon, a Democrat, was barred from seeking a third term. Exon was elected to the U.S. Senate that same day.

== Nevada ==
1978 Nevada gubernatorial election
- November 7, 1978
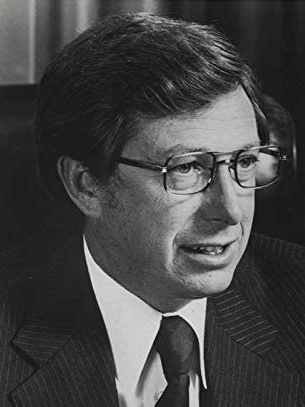

Nominee	Robert List	Robert E. Rose
Party	Republican	Democratic
Popular vote	108,097	76,361
Percentage	56.2%	39.7%
- County results List: 40–50% 50–60% 60–70% Rose: 50–60%
Governor before election
Mike O'Callaghan
Democratic
Elected Governor
Robert List
Republican

The 1978 Nevada gubernatorial election occurred on November 7, 1978. Incumbent Democratic governor Mike O'Callaghan was term limited. Republican nominee Robert List was elected Governor of Nevada, defeating Democratic nominee Robert E. Rose. Jack Lund Schofield unsuccessfully sought the Democratic nomination.

== New Hampshire ==
1978 New Hampshire gubernatorial election
- November 7, 1978
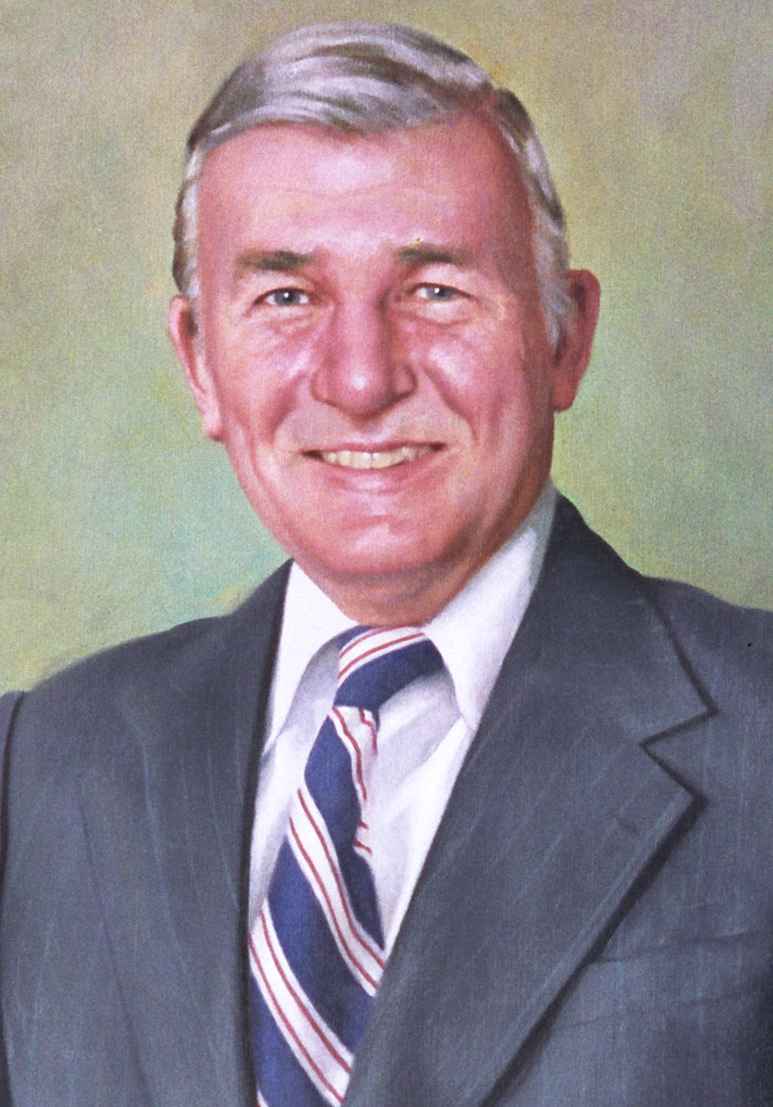

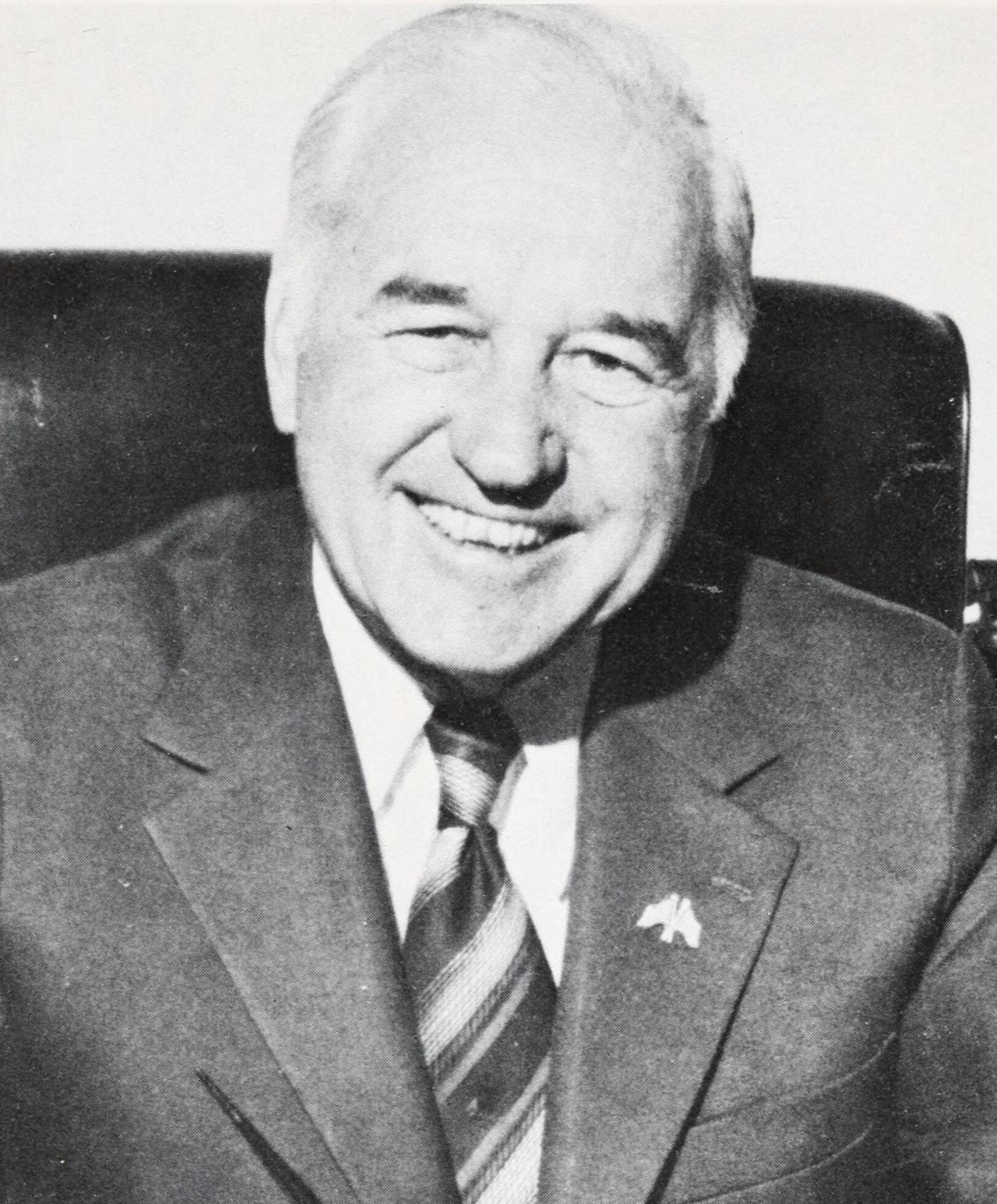
Nominee	Hugh Gallen	Meldrim Thomson Jr.
Party	Democratic	Republican
Popular vote	133,133	122,464
Percentage	49.38%	45.43%
- Gallen: 40–50% 50–60% 60–70% 70–80% 80–90% >90% Thomson: 40–50% 50–60% 60–70% 70–80% 80–90% >90% Brewster: >90% No Data/Vote
Governor before election
Meldrim Thomson Jr.
Republican
Elected Governor
Hugh Gallen
Democratic

The 1978 New Hampshire gubernatorial election took place on November 7, 1978. Incumbent Republican governor Meldrim Thomson Jr., who defeated former governor Wesley Powell for the Republican nomination, ran for a fourth term in office, but was defeated by former State Representative Hugh Gallen.

== New Mexico ==
1978 New Mexico gubernatorial election
- November 7, 1978
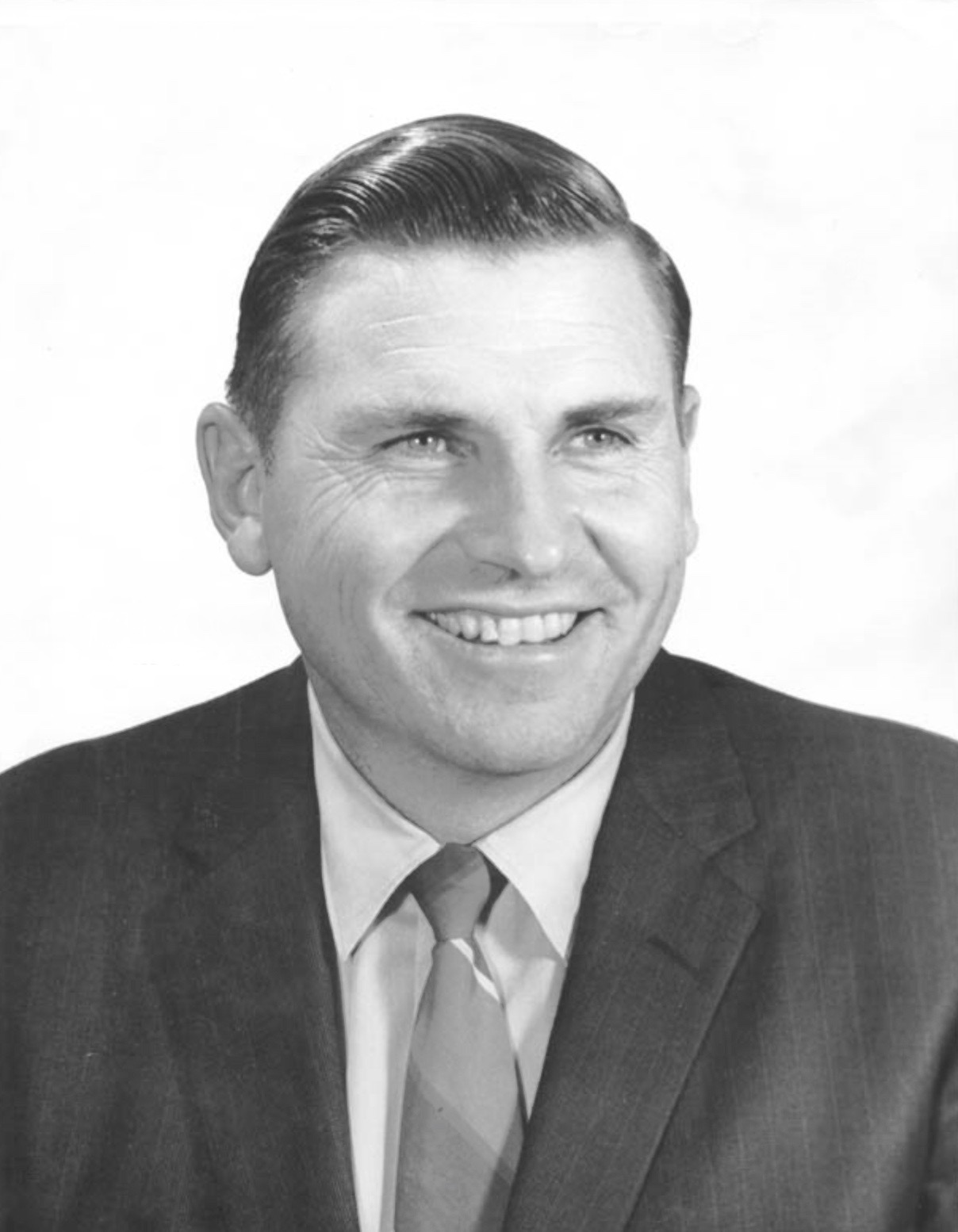

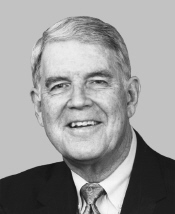
Nominee	Bruce King	Joe Skeen
Party	Democratic	Republican
Popular vote	174,631	170,848
Percentage	50.55%	49.45%
- County results King: 50–60% 60–70% Skeen: 50–60% 60–70% 70–80%
Governor before election
Jerry Apodaca
Democratic
Elected Governor
Bruce King
Democratic

The 1978 New Mexico gubernatorial election took place on November 7, 1978, in order to elect the Governor of New Mexico. Due to term limits, incumbent Democrat Jerry Apodaca was ineligible to seek a second term as governor. Bruce King, a member of the Democratic Party who had previously served as governor from 1971 to 1975, won the open seat.

== New York ==
1978 New York gubernatorial election
- November 7, 1978
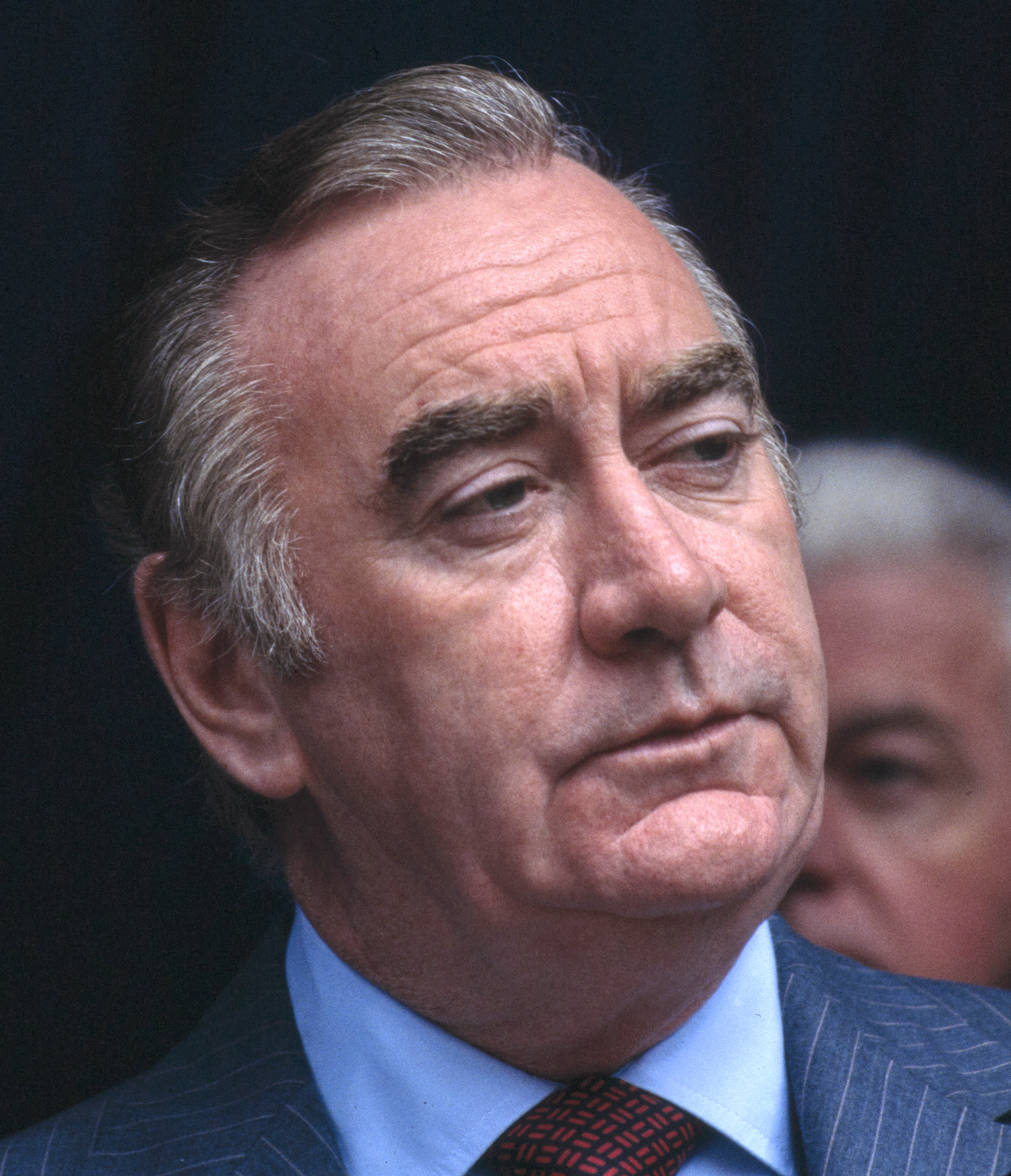

Nominee	Hugh Carey	Perry Duryea
Party	Democratic	Republican
Alliance	Liberal	Conservative
Running mate	Mario Cuomo	Bruce Caputo
Popular vote	2,429,272	2,156,404
Percentage	50.95%	45.22%
- County results Carey: 40–50% 50–60% 60–70% 70–80% Duryea: 40–50% 50–60% 60–70%
Governor before election
Hugh Carey
Democratic
Elected Governor
Hugh Carey
Democratic

The 1978 New York gubernatorial election was held on November 7, 1978 to elect the Governor and Lieutenant Governor of New York. It was the first reelection of a Democratic governor in New York since 1938.

== Ohio ==
1978 Ohio gubernatorial election
- November 7, 1978
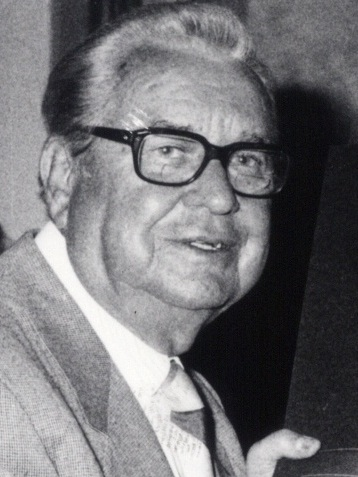

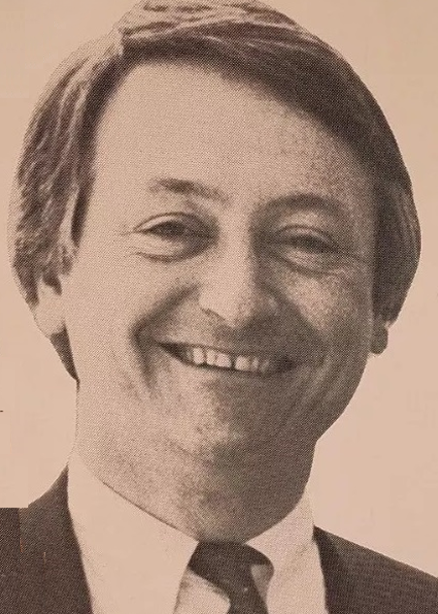
Nominee	Jim Rhodes	Dick Celeste
Party	Republican	Democratic
Running mate	George Voinovich	Michael J. Dorrian
Popular vote	1,402,167	1,354,631
Percentage	49.31%	47.64%
- County results Rhodes: 40–50% 50–60% 60–70% Celeste: 40–50% 50–60% 60–70%
Governor before election
Jim Rhodes
Republican
Elected Governor
Jim Rhodes
Republican

The 1978 Ohio gubernatorial election was held on November 7, 1978. Incumbent Republican Jim Rhodes defeated Democratic nominee Dick Celeste with 49.31% of the vote.

== Oklahoma ==
1978 Oklahoma gubernatorial election
- November 7, 1978
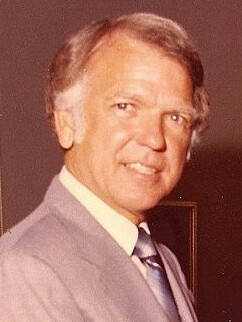

Nominee	George Nigh	Ron Shotts
Party	Democratic	Republican
Popular vote	402,240	367,055
Percentage	51.7%	47.2%
- County results Nigh: 50–60% 60–70% 70–80% Shotts: 50–60% 60–70%
Governor before election
David Boren
Democratic
Elected Governor
George Nigh
Democratic

The 1978 Oklahoma gubernatorial election was held on November 7, 1978, to elect the next governor of Oklahoma. Incumbent Democratic governor David Boren chose not to run for re-election to a second term in office. Instead, Boren decided to run for the United States Senate. Former governor, and sitting lieutenant governor George Nigh was elected, defeating Republican nominee Ron Shotts.

== Oregon ==
1978 Oregon gubernatorial election
- November 7, 1978
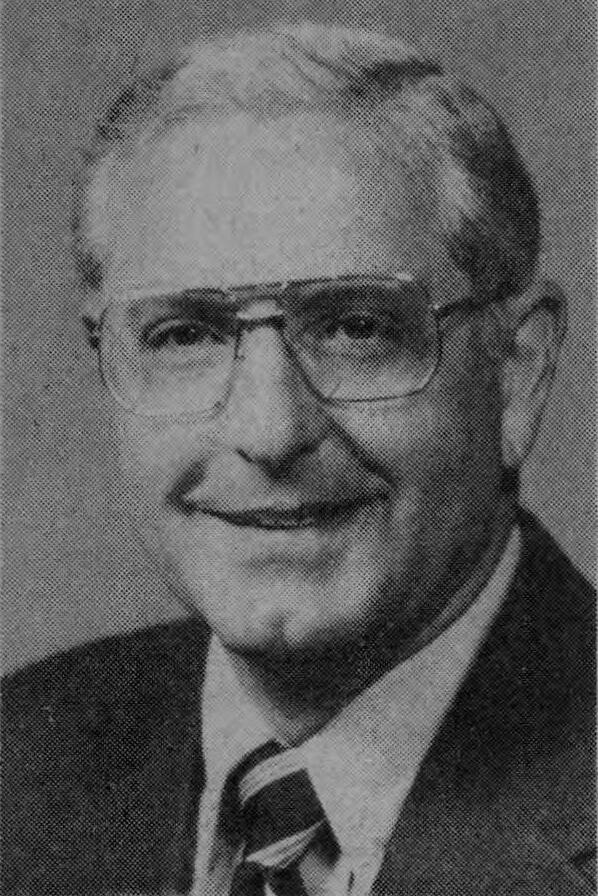

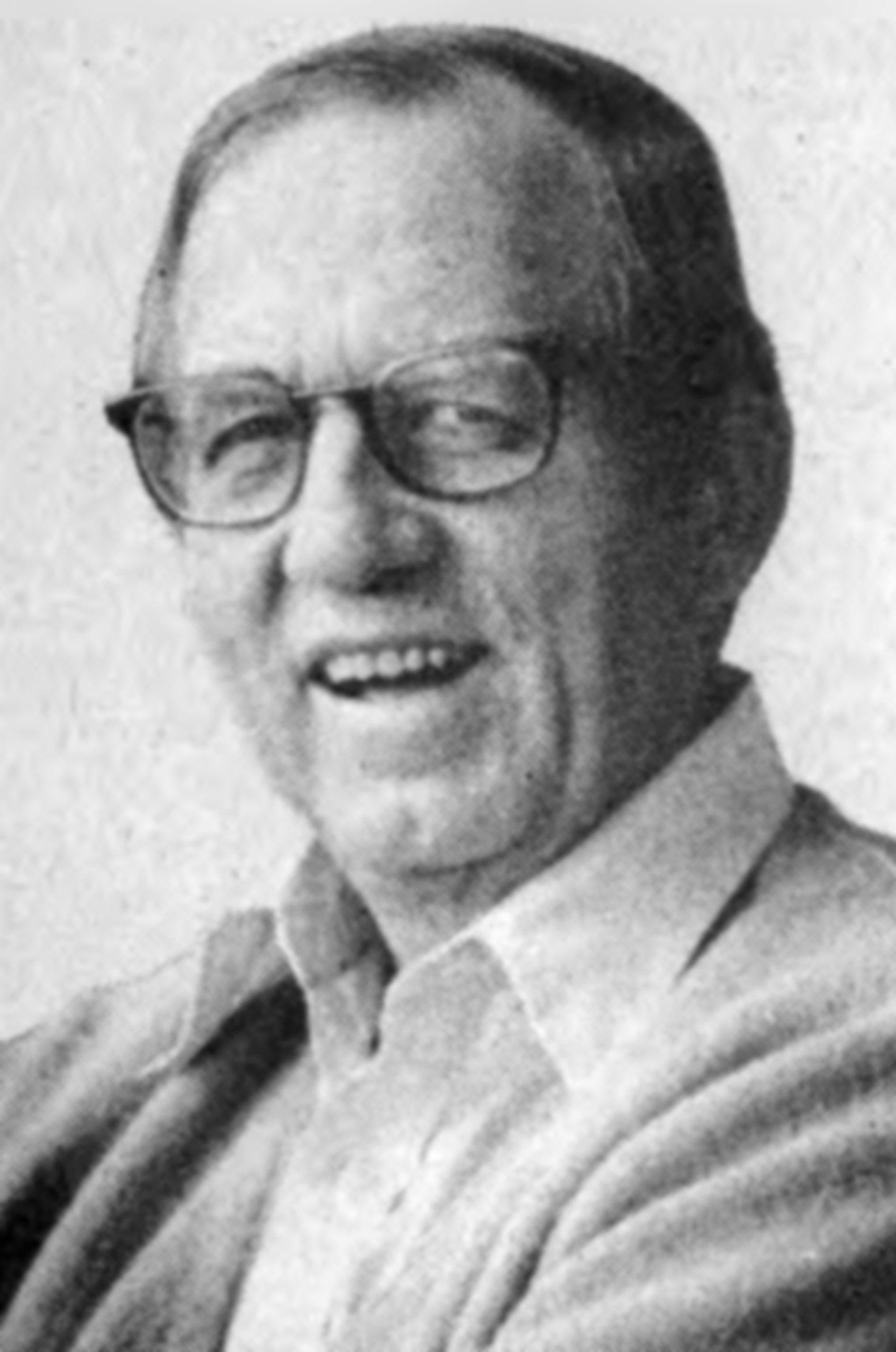
Nominee	Victor Atiyeh	Robert Straub
Party	Republican	Democratic
Popular vote	498,452	409,411
Percentage	54.9%	45.1%
- County results Atiyeh: 50–60% 60–70% 70–80% Straub: 50–60%
Governor before election
Robert Straub
Democratic
Elected Governor
Victor Atiyeh
Republican

The 1978 Oregon gubernatorial election took place on November 7, 1978. In a rematch of the 1974 contest, Republican nominee Victor Atiyeh defeated Democratic incumbent Robert Straub to win the election.

== Pennsylvania ==
1978 Pennsylvania gubernatorial election
- November 7, 1978
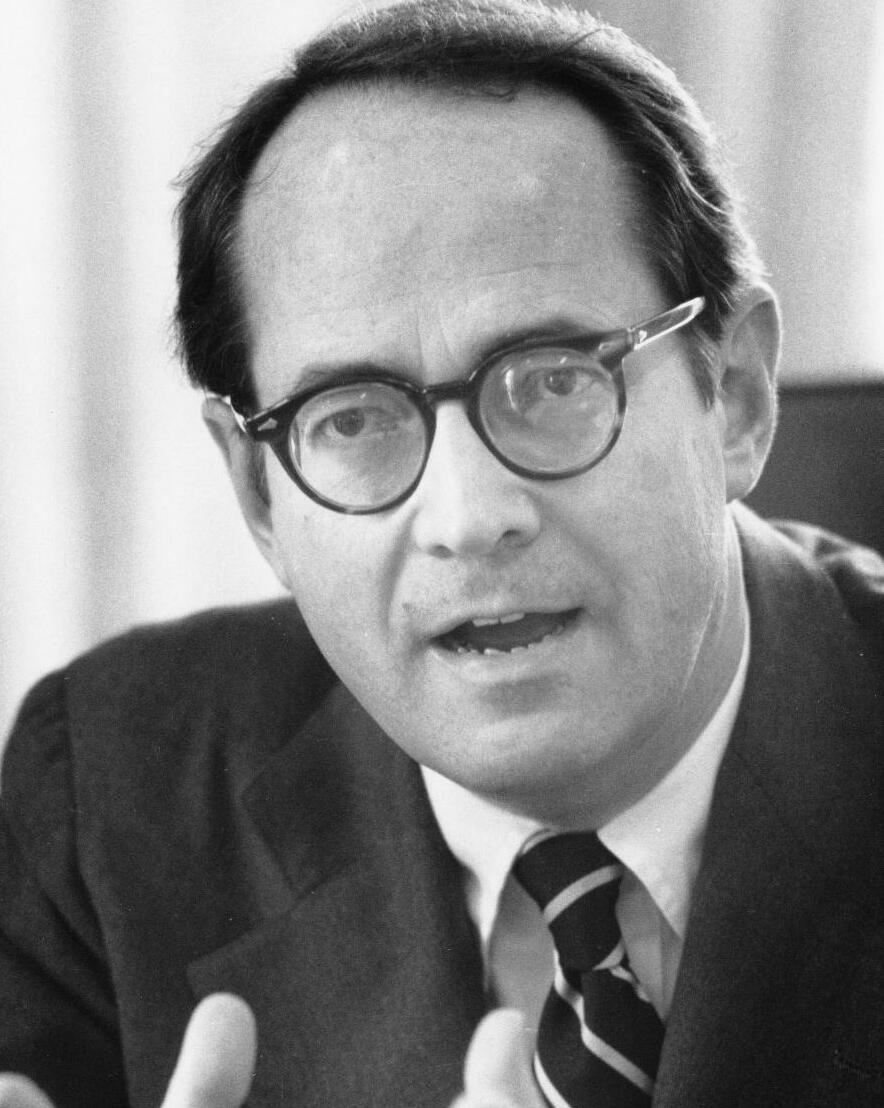

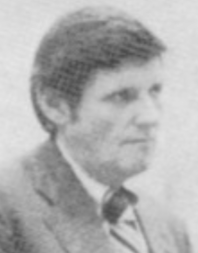
Nominee	Dick Thornburgh	Pete Flaherty
Party	Republican	Democratic
Running mate	Bill Scranton III	Robert P. Casey
Popular vote	1,966,042	1,737,888
Percentage	52.54%	46.44%
- County results Thornburgh: 40-50% 50-60% 60-70% 70-80% Flaherty: 40–50% 50–60% 60–70%
Governor before election
Milton Shapp
Democratic
Elected Governor
Dick Thornburgh
Republican

The 1978 Pennsylvania gubernatorial election was held on November 7, 1978. Incumbent Governor Milton Shapp was constitutionally ineligible to run for a third consecutive term in office. Republican Dick Thornburgh defeated Democrat Pete Flaherty in the general election.

== Rhode Island ==
1978 Rhode Island gubernatorial election
- November 7, 1978
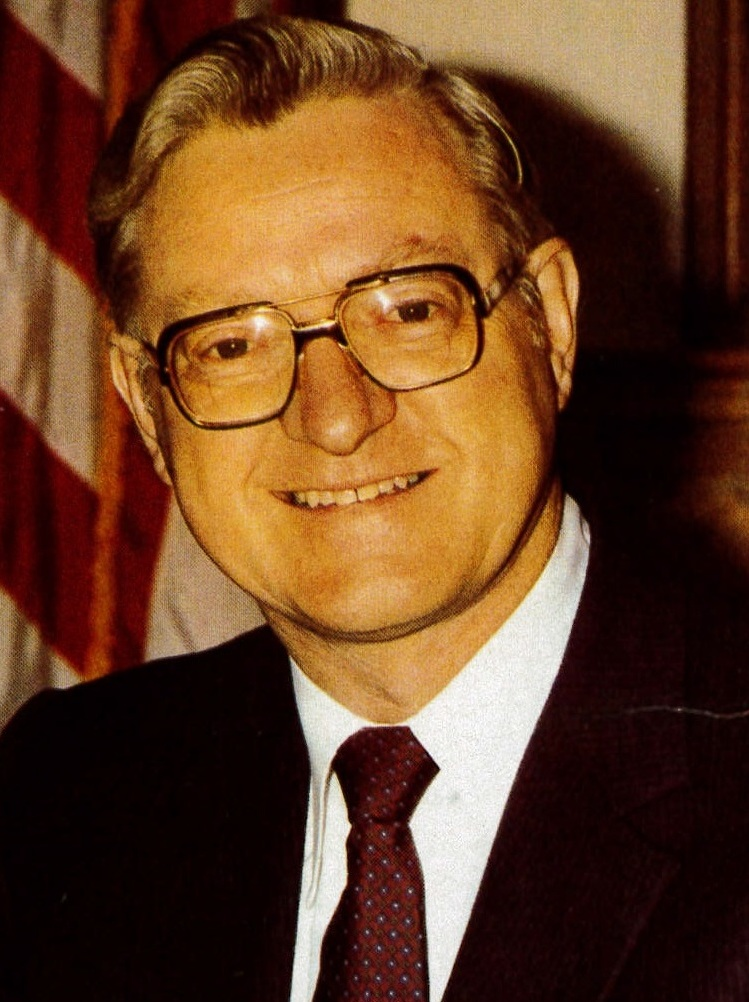

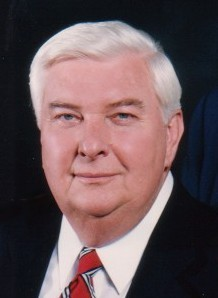

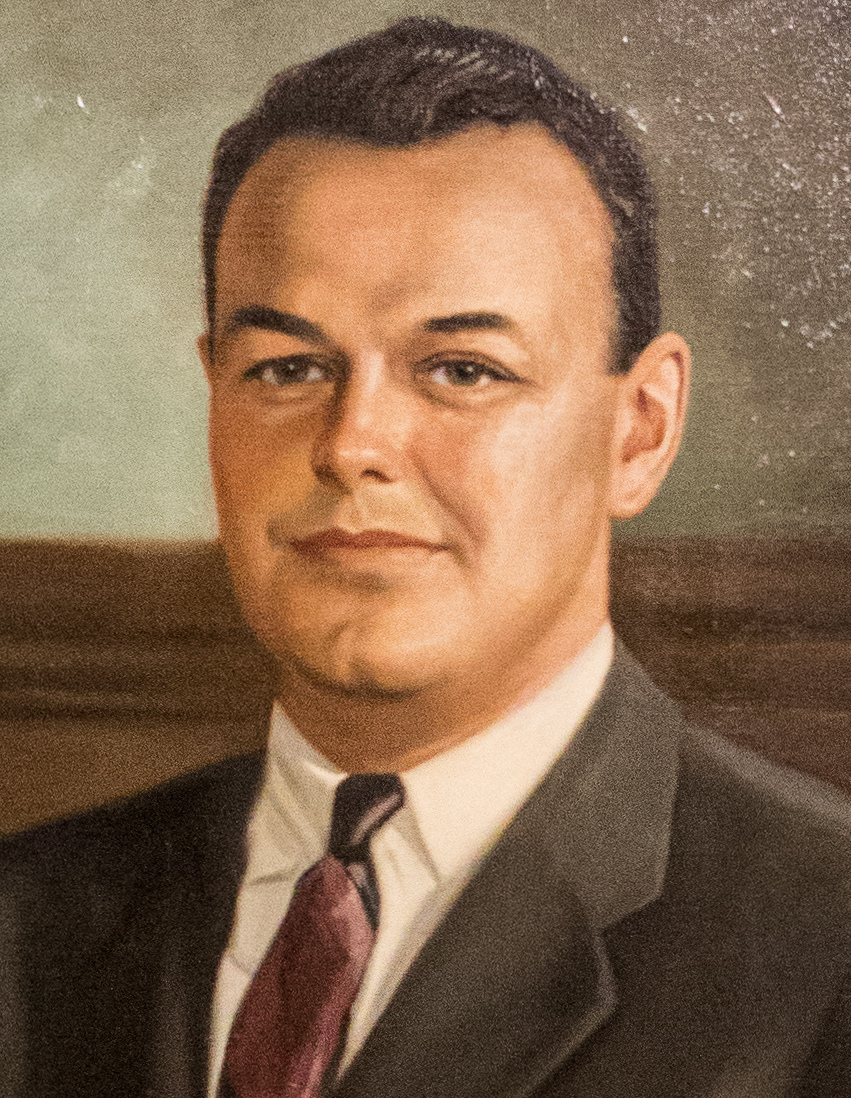
Nominee	J. Joseph Garrahy	Lincoln Almond	Joseph A. Doorley Jr.
Party	Democratic	Republican	Independent
Popular vote	197,386	96,596	20,381
Percentage	62.79%	30.73%	6.48%
- Garrahy: 40–50% 50–60% 60–70% 70–80% Almond: 50–60%
Governor before election
J. Joseph Garrahy
Democratic
Elected Governor
J. Joseph Garrahy
Democratic

The 1978 Rhode Island gubernatorial election was held on November 7, 1978. Incumbent Democrat J. Joseph Garrahy defeated Republican nominee and future governor Lincoln Almond with 62.79% of the vote.

== South Carolina ==
1978 South Carolina gubernatorial election
- November 7, 1978
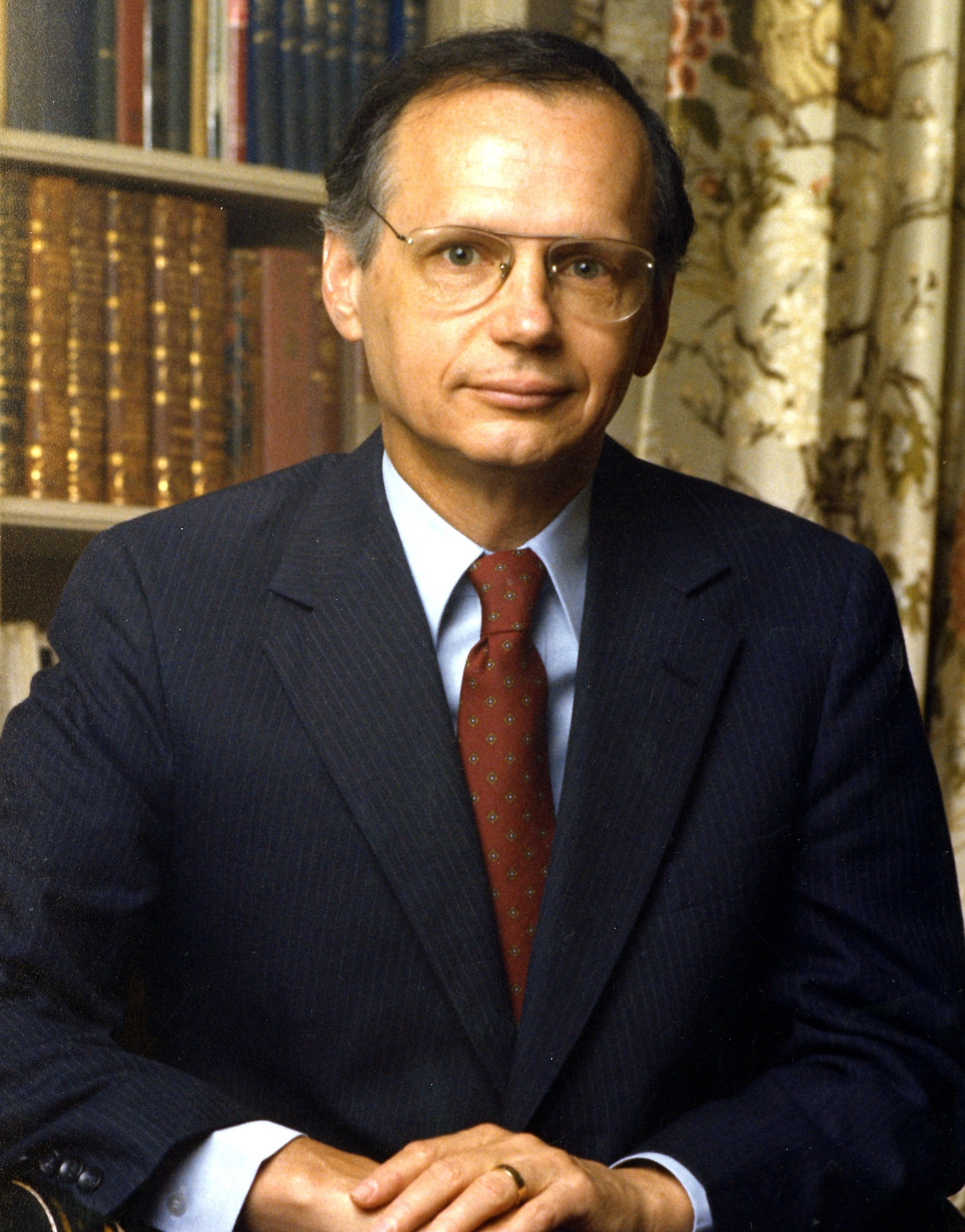

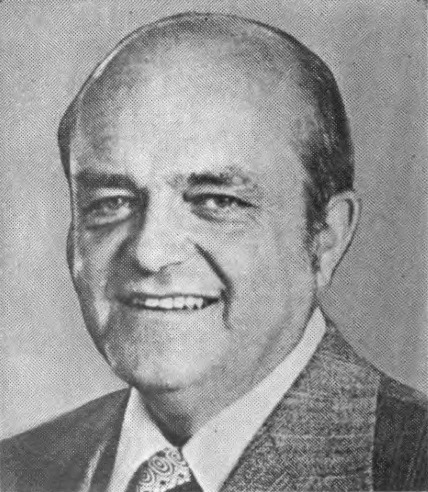
Nominee	Richard Riley	Edward Lunn Young
Party	Democratic	Republican
Popular vote	384,898	236,946
Percentage	61.3%	37.7%
- County results Riley: 50–60% 60–70% 70–80% Young: 50–60%
Governor before election
James B. Edwards
Republican
Elected Governor
Richard Riley
Democratic

The 1978 South Carolina gubernatorial election was held on November 7, 1978 to select the governor of the state of South Carolina. Richard Riley, the Democratic nominee, defeated Republican Edward Lunn Young and became the 111th governor of South Carolina.

== South Dakota ==
1978 South Dakota gubernatorial election
- November 7, 1978
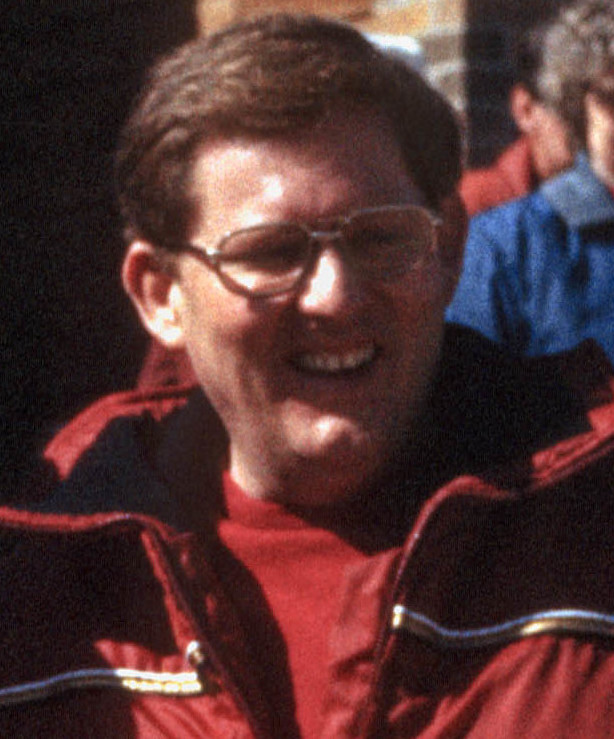

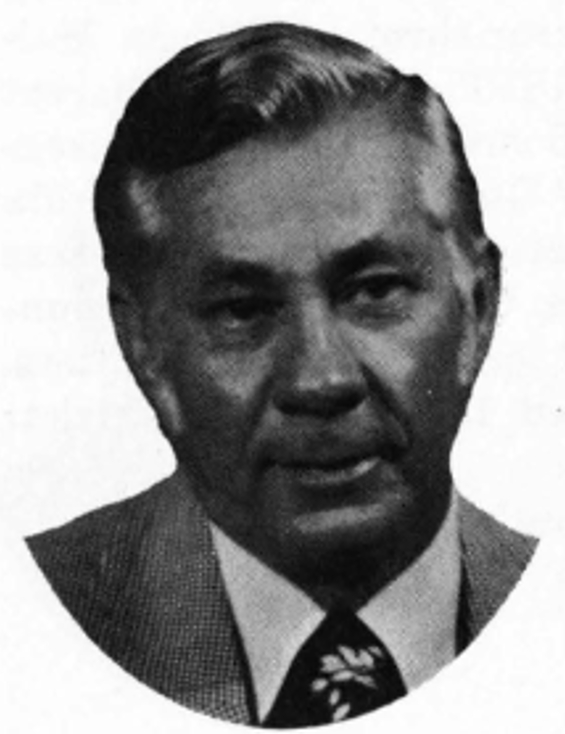
Nominee	Bill Janklow	Roger D. McKellips
Party	Republican	Democratic
Running mate	Lowell Hansen	Billie Sutton
Popular vote	147,116	112,679
Percentage	56.6%	43.4%
- County results Janklow: 50–60% 60–70% 70–80% McKellips: 50–60% 60–70% 80–90%
Governor before election
Harvey Wollman
Democratic
Elected Governor
Bill Janklow
Republican

The 1978 South Dakota gubernatorial election was held on November 7, 1978, to elect a Governor of South Dakota. Republican nominee Bill Janklow was elected, defeating Democratic nominee Roger D. McKellips.

== Tennessee ==
1978 Tennessee gubernatorial election
- November 7, 1978
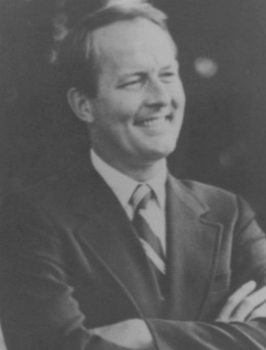

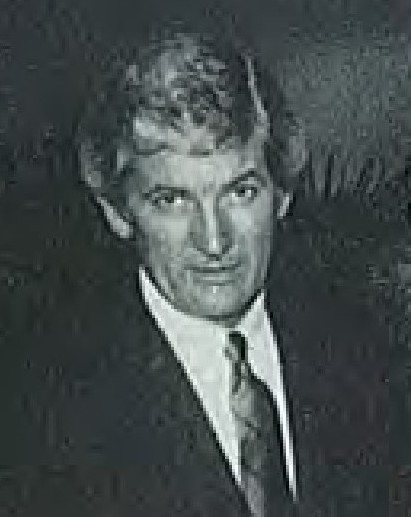
Nominee	Lamar Alexander	Jake Butcher
Party	Republican	Democratic
Popular vote	661,959	523,495
Percentage	55.84%	44.16%
- County results Alexander: 50–60% 60–70% 70–80% Butcher: 50–60% 60–70%
Governor before election
Ray Blanton
Democratic
Elected Governor
Lamar Alexander
Republican

The 1978 Tennessee gubernatorial election was held on November 7, 1978, to elect the next governor of Tennessee. Although the Tennessee State Constitution had been amended in early 1978 to allow a governor to succeed himself, Incumbent Democratic governor Ray Blanton chose not to seek re-election amid several scandals. Republican Lamar Alexander once again ran for governor. In the general election, Alexander defeated Democratic nominee Jake Butcher with 55.8% of the vote.

== Texas ==
1978 Texas gubernatorial election
- November 7, 1978
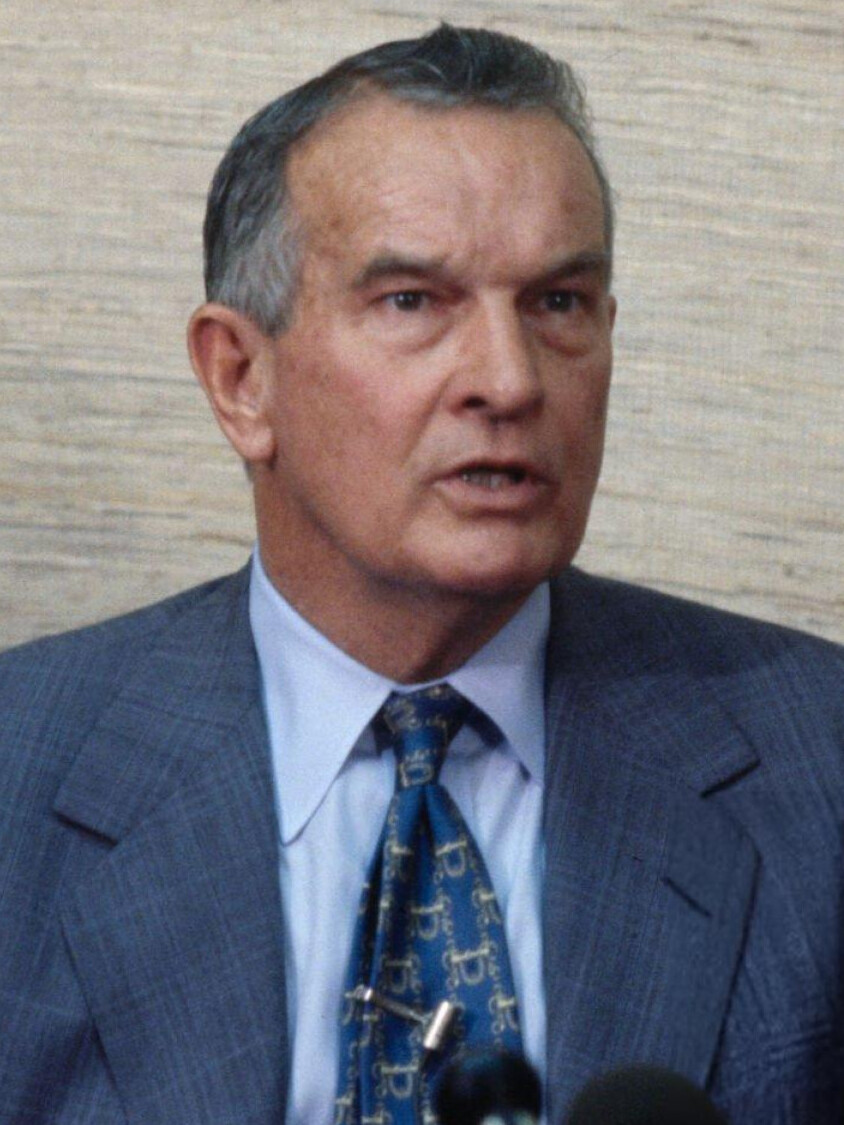

Nominee	Bill Clements	John Luke Hill
Party	Republican	Democratic
Popular vote	1,183,828	1,166,919
Percentage	50.0%	49.2%
- County results Clements: 40–50% 50–60% 60–70% 70–80% Hill: 40–50% 50–60% 60–70% 70–80% 80–90% Compeán: 50–60%
Governor before election
Dolph Briscoe
Democratic
Elected Governor
Bill Clements
Republican

The 1978 Texas gubernatorial election was held on November 7, 1978, to elect the governor of Texas. In a surprising upset, Republican Bill Clements was narrowly elected over Democratic State Attorney General John Luke Hill, winning 50% of the vote to Hill's 49%. In doing so, Clements became the first Republican to be elected governor since Reconstruction in 1869.

== Vermont ==
1978 Vermont gubernatorial election
- November 7, 1978
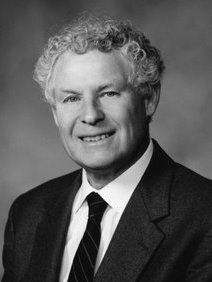

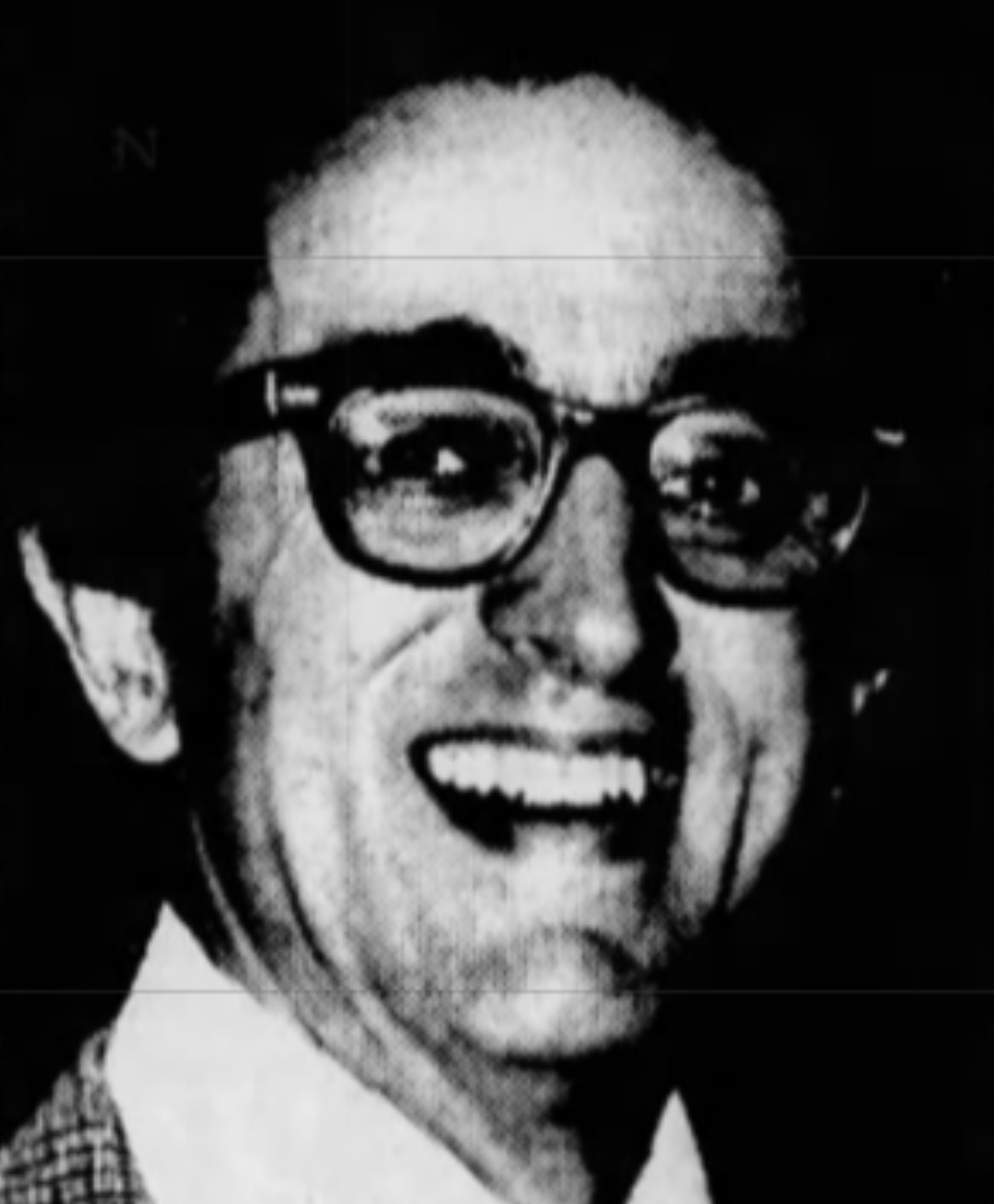
Nominee	Richard Snelling	Edwin Granai
Party	Republican	Democratic
Popular vote	78,181	42,482
Percentage	62.8%	34.1%
- Snelling: 40-50% 50-60% 60-70% 70-80% 80-90% >90% Granai: 40-50% 50-60%
Governor before election
Richard Snelling
Republican
Elected Governor
Richard Snelling
Republican

The 1978 Vermont gubernatorial election took place on November 7, 1978. Incumbent Republican Richard Snelling ran successfully for a second term as Governor of Vermont, defeating Democratic candidate Edwin Granai. As of 2014, this was the most recent Vermont gubernatorial election in which both major party candidates are now deceased.

== Wisconsin ==
1978 Wisconsin gubernatorial election
- November 7, 1978
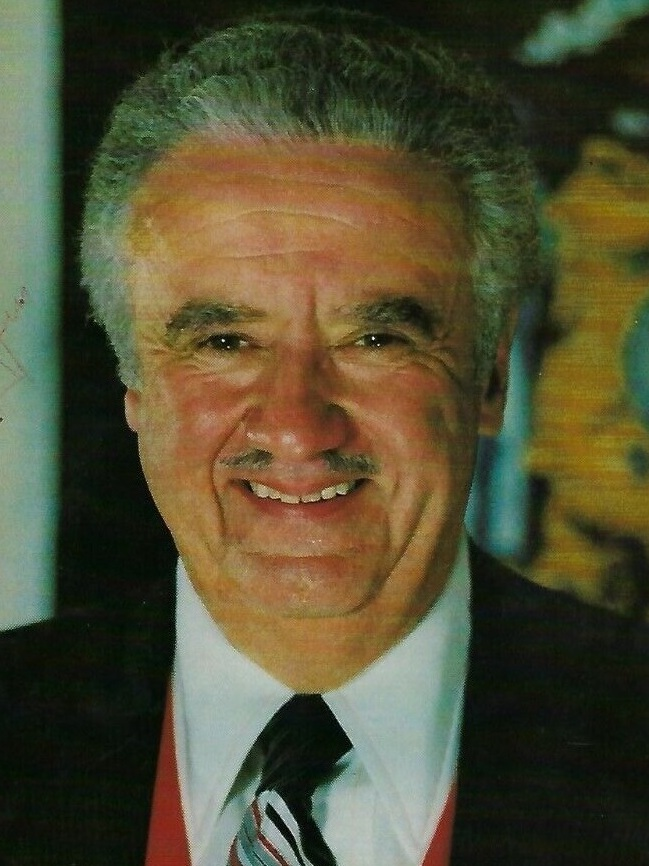

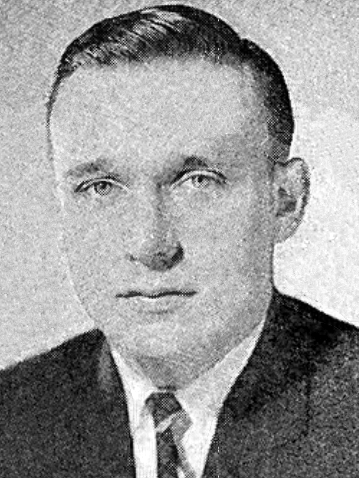
Nominee	Lee S. Dreyfus	Martin J. Schreiber
Party	Republican	Democratic
Running mate	Russell A. Olson	Douglas J. La Follette
Popular vote	816,056	673,813
Percentage	54.37%	44.89%
- County results Dreyfus: 50–60% 60–70% Schreiber: 40–50% 50–60% 60–70% 70–80%
Governor before election
Martin J. Schreiber
Democratic
Elected Governor
Lee S. Dreyfus
Republican

The 1978 Wisconsin gubernatorial election was held on November 7, 1978. Republican Lee S. Dreyfus won the election with 54% of the vote, winning his first term as Governor of Wisconsin and defeating incumbent Democrat Martin J. Schreiber. Bob Kasten unsuccessfully sought the Republican nomination.

== Wyoming ==
1978 Wyoming gubernatorial election
- November 7, 1978
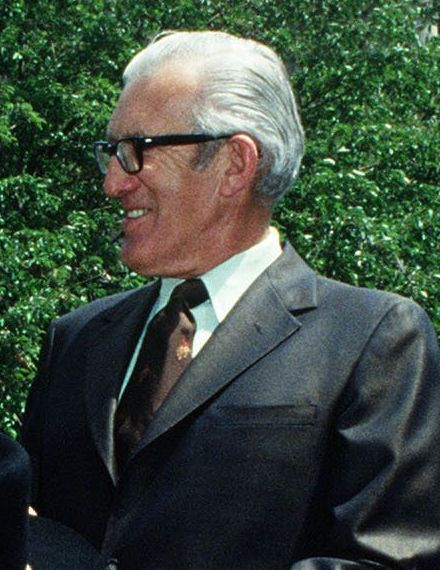

Nominee	Edgar Herschler	John Ostlund
Party	Democratic	Republican
Popular vote	69,972	67,595
Percentage	50.86%	49.14%
- County results Herschler: 50–60% 60–70% Ostlund: 50–60% 60–70% 70–80%
Governor before election
Edgar Herschler
Democratic
Elected Governor
Edgar Herschler
Democratic

The 1978 Wyoming gubernatorial election took place on November 7, 1978. Incumbent Democratic Governor Edgar Herschler ran for re-election to a second term. After winning a contested Democratic primary, he advanced to the general election, where he faced former State Senator John Ostlund, the Republican nominee. Despite the strong Republican performance nationwide, Herschler's personal popularity allowed him to narrowly win re-election to Ostlund, making him the first Democratic Governor to win re-election since Lester C. Hunt in 1946.

== Territories and federal district ==
=== District of Columbia ===
1978 United States gubernatorial elections
- November 7, 1978
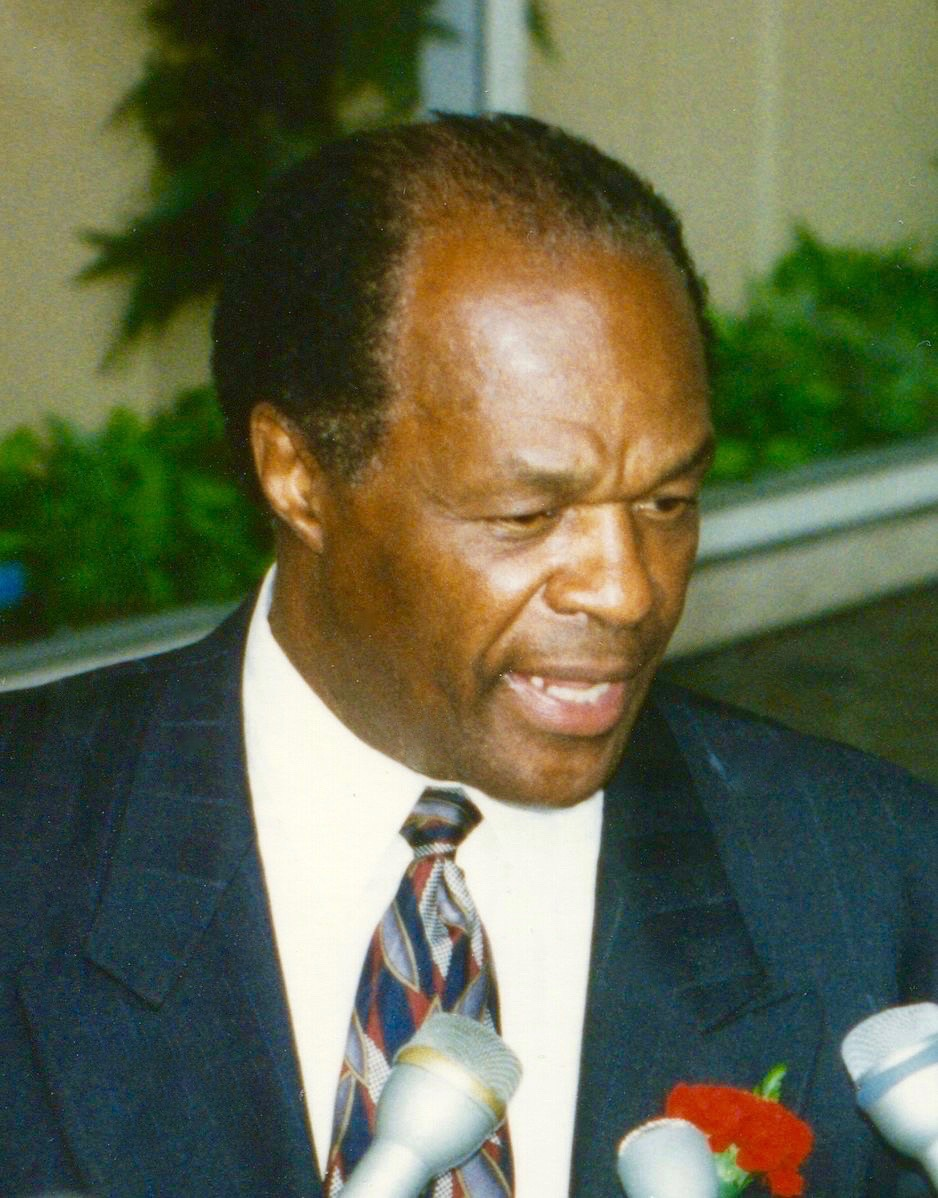

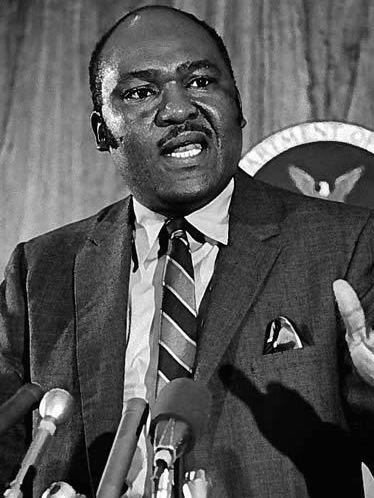
Nominee	Marion Barry	Arthur Fletcher
Party	Democratic	Republican
Popular vote	68,354	27,366
Percentage	70.2%	28.1%
Mayor before election
Walter Washington
Democratic
Elected mayor
Marion Barry
Democratic

On November 7, 1978, Washington, D.C., held the second election for its mayor as a result of the District of Columbia Home Rule Act. The primary election of the Democratic Party (the most important contest in the race, as 90% of the District's voters were registered Democrats) took place on Tuesday, September 12, with At-Large Councilman Marion Barry defeating incumbent mayor Walter E. Washington and Council Chair Sterling Tucker to become the Democratic nominee for Mayor. Barry defeated Republican nominee Arthur Fletcher and two marginal candidates in the general election on November 7, 1978.

=== Guam ===
Guam election
Party	Candidate	Votes	%
Republican	Paul M. Calvo	{{{votes}}}	52.1%
Democratic	Ricardo Bordallo	{{{votes}}}	47.9%
Total votes		{{{votes}}}	100.00
Republican gain from Democratic			

=== U.S. Virgin Islands ===
U.S. Virgin Islands election
Party	Candidate	Votes	%
Independent	Juan Francisco Luis	{{{votes}}}	59.19%
Democratic	Ron de Lugo	{{{votes}}}	40.81%
Total votes		{{{votes}}}	100.00
Independent hold			

== See also ==
- 1978 United States elections
  - 1978 United States Senate elections
  - 1978 United States House of Representatives elections
