= Allan Larsen =

American politician from Idaho

Member of the Idaho House of Representatives
- In office 1992–1996
- In office 1966–1978

Member of the Idaho Senate
- In office 1990–1992

Personal details
- Born: Allan Franklin Larsen; April 4, 1919 Preston, Idaho, U.S.
- Died: March 2, 2005 (aged 85) Bingham County, Idaho, U.S.
- Party: Republican
- Education: Utah Agricultural College

Allan Franklin Larsen (April 4, 1919 – March 2, 2005) was an American Republican politician from Eastern Idaho who served as a member of both chambers of the Idaho Legislature. He was the Republican nominee in the 1978 Idaho gubernatorial election.

== Early life and education ==
Born in Preston, Idaho, he attended Utah Agricultural College (now Utah State University) in Logan.

== Career ==
Larsen operated a potato farm near Firth in Bingham County. First elected to the state legislature in 1966, he served six terms in the Idaho House of Representatives, the last two as speaker. He was the Republican nominee in the 1978 Idaho gubernatorial election, but was defeated by the Democratic incumbent, John Evans of Malad.

Larsen returned to private life on his farm for 12 years. Following his first wife's death and his remarriage to Alva Lu Hebdon, he returned to the legislature when he was elected to the Idaho Senate in 1990 and the House of Representatives in 1992 and 1994.

== Personal life ==
Larsen died in Bingham County, Idaho at age 85 in 2005; he and his first wife Barbara (1920–1990) are buried at the Riverside-Thomas Cemetery in Blackfoot.

Party political offices
Preceded by Jack M. Murphy	Republican Party nominee, Governor of Idaho; 1978 (lost)	Succeeded by Phil Batt
