= Riverside-Thomas Cemetery =

Historic cemetery in Bingham County, Idaho, US

Details
- Established: 1887
- Coordinates: 43°11′45″N 112°29′01″W
- Type: Public Cemetery
- No. of graves: >6,000
- Find a Grave: Riverside-Thomas Cemetery

Riverside-Thomas Cemetery is a historical cemetery located in Bingham County, Idaho. The cemetery was unofficially established by the first interment of James William Parsons who died on June 6, 1887. The cemetery has a capacity of 6,874 deceased persons. The Riverside-Thomas Cemetery District was officially established January 26, 1931.
