= 1974 United States gubernatorial elections =

- November 5, 1974

37 governorships 35 states; 2 territories
	Majority party	Minority party
Party	Democratic	Republican
Seats before	32	18
Seats after	36	13
Seat change	▲4	▼5
Seats up	23	12
Seats won	27	7
	Third party
Party	Independent
Seats before	0
Seats after	1
Seat change	▲1
Seats up	0
Seats won	1
- Republican hold Republican gain Democratic hold Democratic gain Independent gain

United States gubernatorial elections were held on November 5, 1974, in 35 states and two territories. The Democrats achieved a net gain of four seats, Republicans took a net loss of five seats, and one Independent was elected to the governorship of a state. This election coincided with the Senate and the House elections.

In Iowa, Kansas, South Dakota and Texas, governors were elected to four-year terms for the first time, instead of two-year terms. As of 2026, this is the last time that a Democrat was elected South Dakota governor. This is the first time a woman has been elected governor whose husband was not governor of any state. (In this case, Connecticut.)

== Election results ==
=== States ===
State	Incumbent	Party	First elected	Result	Candidates
Alabama	George Wallace	Democratic	1962; 1966 (term-limited); 1970	Incumbent re-elected.	✓ George Wallace (Democratic) 83.16%; Elvin McCary (Republican) 14.77%; Jim Partain (Prohibition) 2.06%
Alaska	William A. Egan	Democratic	1958; 1966 (defeated); 1970	Incumbent lost re-election. New governor elected. Republican gain.	✓ Jay Hammond (Republican) 47.67%; William A. Egan (Democratic) 47.37%; Joe Vogler (Alaskan Ind.) 4.96%
Arizona	Jack Williams	Republican	1966	Incumbent retired. New governor elected. Democratic gain.	✓ Raúl Héctor Castro (Democratic) 50.41%; Russell Williams (Republican) 49.56%
Arkansas	Dale Bumpers	Democratic	1970	Incumbent retired. New governor elected. Democratic hold.	✓ David Pryor (Democratic) 65.57%; Ken Coon (Republican) 34.41%
California	Ronald Reagan	Republican	1966	Incumbent retired. New governor elected. Democratic gain.	✓ Jerry Brown (Democratic) 50.11%; Houston I. Flournoy (Republican) 47.25%; Edmon Kaiser (AI) 1.34%; Elizabeth Keathley (PF) 1.2%
Colorado	John D. Vanderhoof	Republican	1973 (Note: Vanderhoof took office after his predecessor (John Arthur Love) resigned.)	Incumbent lost election to full term. New governor elected. Democratic gain.	✓ Richard Lamm (Democratic) 53.26%; John D. Vanderhoof (Republican) 45.69%; Earl Dodge (Prohibition) 0.77%; Lann Meyers (U.S. Labor) 0.28%
Connecticut	Thomas Meskill	Republican	1970	Incumbent retired. New governor elected. Democratic gain.	✓ Ella Grasso (Democratic) 58.35%; Robert H. Steele (Republican) 39.91%; Thomas Pallone (George Wallace Party) 1.51%; Allen Peichert (American) 0.21%
Florida	Reubin Askew	Democratic	1970	Incumbent re-elected.	✓ Reubin Askew (Democratic) 58.35%; Jerry Thomas (Republican) 38.8%
Georgia	Jimmy Carter	Democratic	1970	Incumbent term-limited. New governor elected. Democratic hold.	✓ George Busbee (Democratic) 69.07%; Ronnie Thompson (Republican) 30.87%
Hawaii	John A. Burns	Democratic	1962	Incumbent retired. New governor elected. Democratic hold.	✓ George Ariyoshi (Democratic) 54.58%; Randolph Crossley (Republican) 45.42%
Idaho	Cecil Andrus	Democratic	1970	Incumbent re-elected.	✓ Cecil Andrus (Democratic) 70.92%; Jack M. Murphy (Republican) 26.47%; Nolan Victor (American) 2.6%
Iowa	Robert D. Ray	Republican	1968	Incumbent re-elected.	✓ Robert D. Ray (Republican) 58.07%; James Schaben (Democratic) 41.02%; Ralph Scott (American) 0.9%
Kansas	Robert Docking	Democratic	1966	Incumbent term-limited. New governor elected. Republican gain.	✓ Robert Frederick Bennett (Republican) 49.47%; Vern Miller (Democratic) 49%; Marshall Uncapher (Prohibition) 1.53%
Maine	Kenneth M. Curtis	Democratic	1970	Incumbent term-limited. New governor elected. Independent gain.	✓ James B. Longley (Independent) 39.14%; George J. Mitchell (Democratic) 36.33%; James Erwin (Republican) 23.13%; Stanley Leen (Independent) 0.79%; William B. Hughes (Independent) 0.36%
Maryland	Marvin Mandel	Democratic	1966	Incumbent re-elected.	✓ Marvin Mandel (Democratic) 63.5%; Louise Gore (Republican) 36.5%
Massachusetts	Francis Sargent	Republican	1969 (Note: Sargent took office after his predecessor (John Volpe) resigned.)	Incumbent lost re-election. New governor elected. Democratic gain.	✓ Michael Dukakis (Democratic) 53.5%; Francis Sargent (Republican) 42.29%; Leo Kahian (American) 3.4%; Donald Gurewitz (Socialist Workers) .81%
Michigan	William Milliken	Republican	1969 (Note: Milliken took office after his predecessor (George W. Romney) resigned.)	Incumbent re-elected.	✓ William Milliken (Republican) 51.07%; Sander Levin (Democratic) 46.75%; Zolton Ferency (Human Rights) 1.08%; Hugh M. Davidson (American Independent) .76%; Eldon Andrews (Conservative) .16%
Minnesota	Wendell R. Anderson	Democratic	1970	Incumbent re-elected.	✓ Wendell R. Anderson (Democratic) 62.8%; John W. Johnson (Republican) 29.35%; James Miles (Independent) 4.8%; Harry Pool (American) 1.63%; Jane VanDeusen (Socialist Workers) .74%; Erwin Marquit (Communist) .28%
Nebraska	J. James Exon	Democratic	1970	Incumbent re-elected.	✓ J. James Exon (Democratic) 59.16%; Richard Marvel (Republican) 35.4%; Ernie Chambers (Independent) 5.39%
Nevada	Mike O'Callaghan	Democratic	1970	Incumbent re-elected.	✓ Mike O'Callaghan (Democratic) 67.38%; Shirley Crumpler (Republican) 17.1%; James R. Houston (Ind. American) 15.52%
New Hampshire	Meldrim Thomson Jr.	Republican	1972	Incumbent re-elected.	✓ Meldrim Thomson Jr. (Republican) 51.15%; Richard W. Leonard (Democratic) 48.79%
New Mexico	Bruce King	Democratic	1970	Incumbent term-limited. New governor elected. Democratic hold.	✓ Jerry Apodaca (Democratic) 49.94%; Joe Skeen (Republican) 48.8%; Gene Gonzales (American Independent) 1.26%
New York	Malcolm Wilson	Republican	1973 (Note: Wilson took office after his predecessor (Nelson Rockefeller) resigned.)	Incumbent lost election to full term. New governor elected. Democratic gain.	✓ Hugh Carey (Democratic) 57.22%; Malcolm Wilson (Republican) 41.94%; Wayne Amato (Courage) 0.24%
Ohio	John J. Gilligan	Democratic	1970	Incumbent lost re-election. New governor elected. Republican gain.	✓ Jim Rhodes (Republican) 48.62%; John J. Gilligan (Democratic) 48.25%; Nancy Lazar (Independent) 3.11%
Oklahoma	David Hall	Democratic	1970	Incumbent lost re-nomination. New governor elected. Democratic hold.	✓ David Boren (Democratic) 63.91%; Jim Inhofe (Republican) 36.09%
Oregon	Tom McCall	Republican	1966	Incumbent term-limited. New governor elected. Democratic gain.	✓ Robert W. Straub (Democratic) 57.73%; Victor Atiyeh (Republican) 42.14%
Pennsylvania	Milton Shapp	Democratic	1970	Incumbent re-elected.	✓ Milton Shapp (Democratic) 53.66%; Andrew L. Lewis Jr. (Republican) 45.11%; Stephen Depue (Constitutionalist) 0.96%; Frederick L. Stanton (Socialist Workers) 0.26%
Rhode Island	Philip Noel	Democratic	1972	Incumbent re-elected.	✓ Philip Noel (Democratic) 78.48%; James Nugent (Republican) 21.52%
South Carolina	John C. West	Democratic	1970	Incumbent term-limited. New governor elected. Republican gain.	✓ James B. Edwards (Republican) 50.68%; William Jennings Bryan Dorn (Democratic) 47.41%; Penny Jennings (Independent) 1.58%; Charles Ravenel (Write-in) .12%
South Dakota	Richard F. Kneip	Democratic	1970	Incumbent re-elected.	✓ Richard F. Kneip (Democratic) 53.61%; John E. Olson (Republican) 46.39%
Tennessee	Winfield Dunn	Republican	1970	Incumbent term-limited. New governor elected. Democratic gain.	✓ Ray Blanton (Democratic) 55.88%; Lamar Alexander (Republican) 44.12%
Texas	Dolph Briscoe	Democratic	1972	Incumbent re-elected.	✓ Dolph Briscoe (Democratic) 61.41%; Jim Granberry (Republican) 31.1%; Ramsey Muniz (La Raza Unida) 5.64%; Sam McDonnell (American) 1.34%; Sherry Smith (Socialist Workers) 0.2%
Vermont	Thomas P. Salmon	Democratic	1972	Incumbent re-elected.	✓ Thomas P. Salmon (Democratic) 63.03%; Walter L. Kennedy (Republican) 32.36%; Martha Abbott (Liberty Union) 4.6%
Wisconsin	Patrick Lucey	Democratic	1970	Incumbent re-elected.	✓ Patrick Lucey (Democratic) 53.2%; William Dyke (Republican) 42.08%; William H. Upham Jr. (American) 2.84%; Crazy Jim (Independent) 1.03%; William O. Hart (Socialist) 0.43%
Wyoming	Stanley K. Hathaway	Republican	1966	Incumbent retired. New governor elected. Democratic gain.	✓ Edgar Herschler (Democratic) 55.88%; Dick Jones (Republican) 44.12%

=== Territories and federal district ===
Territory	Incumbent	Party	First elected	Result	Candidates
District of Columbia	None (New office)			New office. New mayor elected. Democratic gain.	✓ Walter Washington (Democratic) 82.5%; Sam Harris (Independent) 7.3%; Jackson R. Champion (Republican) 3.7%; Raymond V. Ellis (Independent) 2.9%; Nan Bailey (Socialist Workers) 2.3%; Tommye Lynn Grant (Independent) 1.3%
Guam	Carlos Camacho	Republican	1970	Incumbent lost re-election. New governor elected. Democratic gain.	✓ Ricardo Bordallo (Democratic) 51.4%; Carlos Camacho (Republican) 48.6%
U.S. Virgin Islands	Melvin H. Evans	Republican	1970	Incumbent lost re-election. New governor elected. Independent gain.	✓ Cyril King (Independent Citizens Movement) 52.1%; Alexander Farrelly (Democratic) 47.9%

== Closest races ==
States where the margin of victory was under 1%:

1. Alaska, 0.3%
2. Ohio, 0.37%
3. Kansas, 0.47%
4. Arizona, 0.85%

States where the margin of victory was under 5%:

1. New Mexico, 1.14%
2. New Hampshire, 2.36%
3. Guam, 2.8%
4. Maine, 2.81%
5. California, 2.86%
6. South Carolina, 3.27%
7. Michigan, 4.32%

States where the margin of victory was under 10%:

1. South Dakota, 7.22%
2. Colorado, 7.57%
3. Pennsylvania, 8.55%
4. Hawaii, 9.16%

== Alabama ==
1974 Alabama gubernatorial election
- November 5, 1974
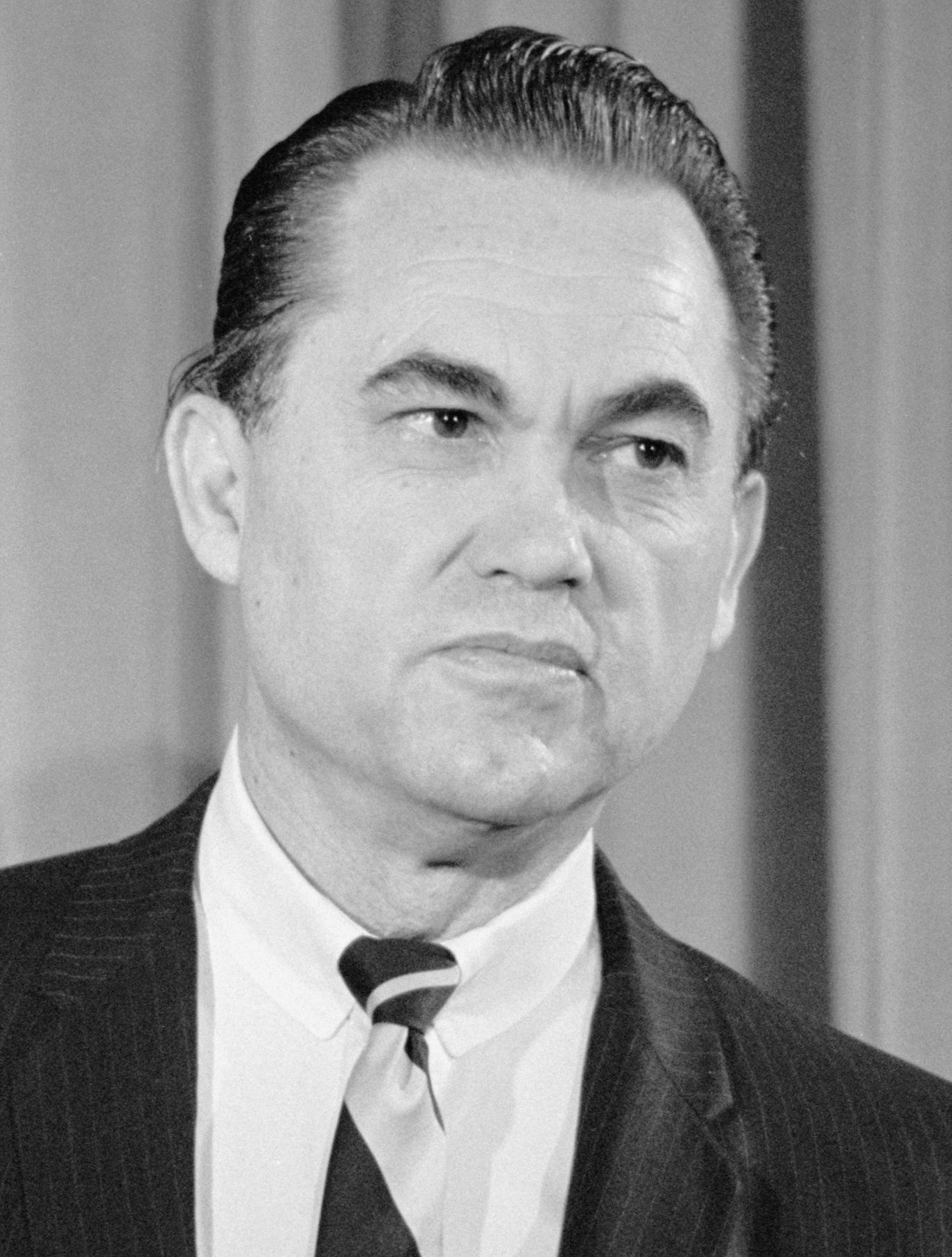

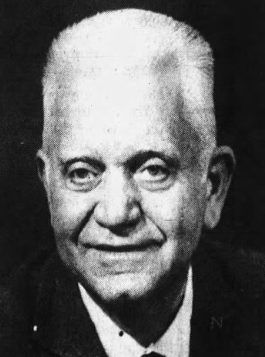
Nominee	George Wallace	Elvin McCary
Party	Democratic	Republican
Popular vote	497,574	88,381
Percentage	83.16%	14.77%
- County results Wallace: 60–70% 70–80% 80–90% >90%
Governor before election
George Wallace
Democratic
Elected Governor
George Wallace
Democratic

The 1974 Alabama gubernatorial election took place on November 5, 1974. Incumbent Democratic governor George Wallace was reelected in a landslide over his Republican opponent, businessman and former state senator Elvin McCary. Wallace was the first Alabama governor to win election to a second consecutive term, as the state's Constitution was amended in 1968 to allow governors to serve a maximum two elected consecutive terms. This was also Wallace's first campaign after having been paralyzed following being shot by Arthur Bremer in an assassination attempt during Wallace's run for the 1972 Democratic presidential nomination.

== Alaska ==
1974 Alaska gubernatorial election
- November 5, 1974
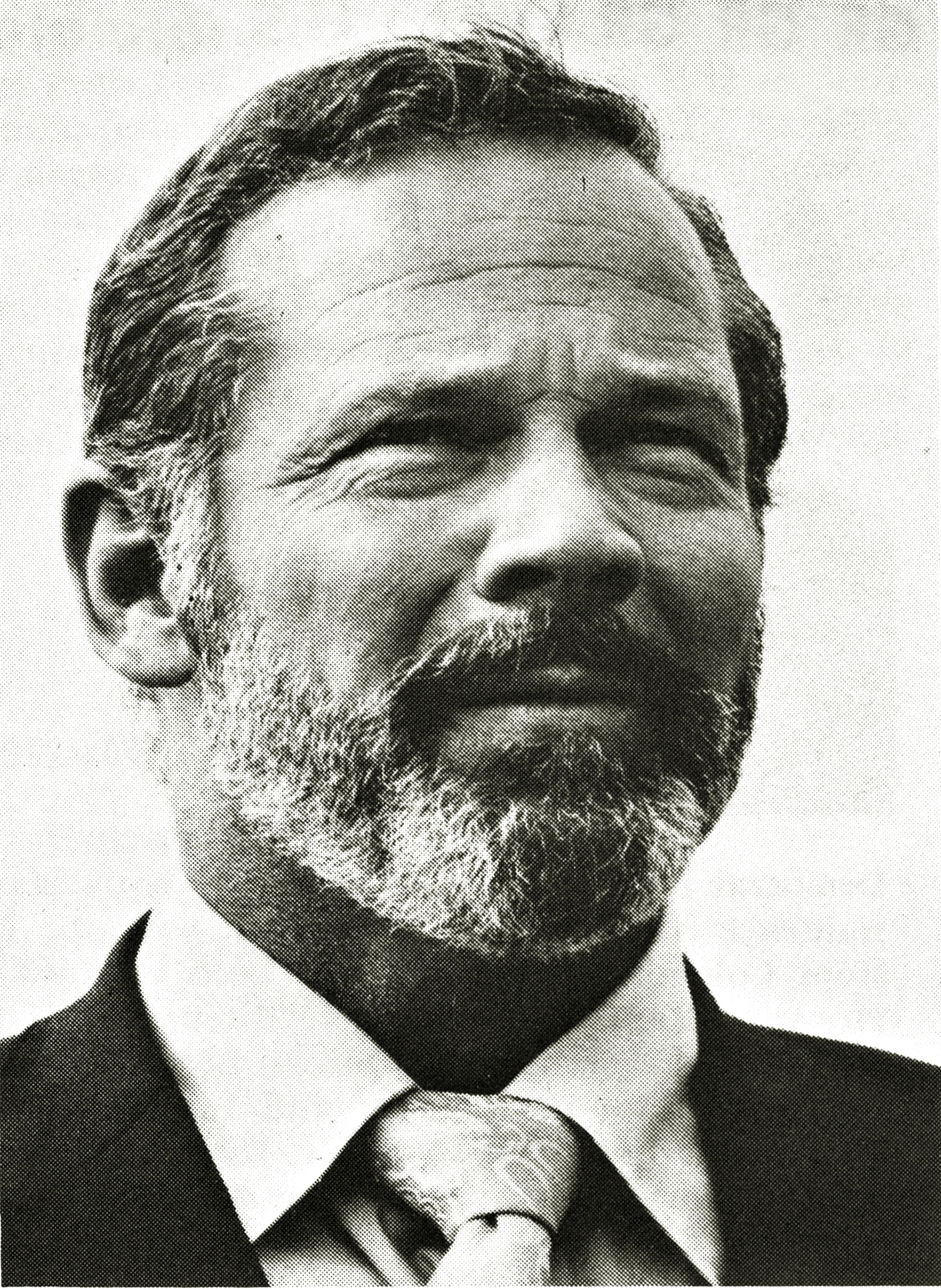

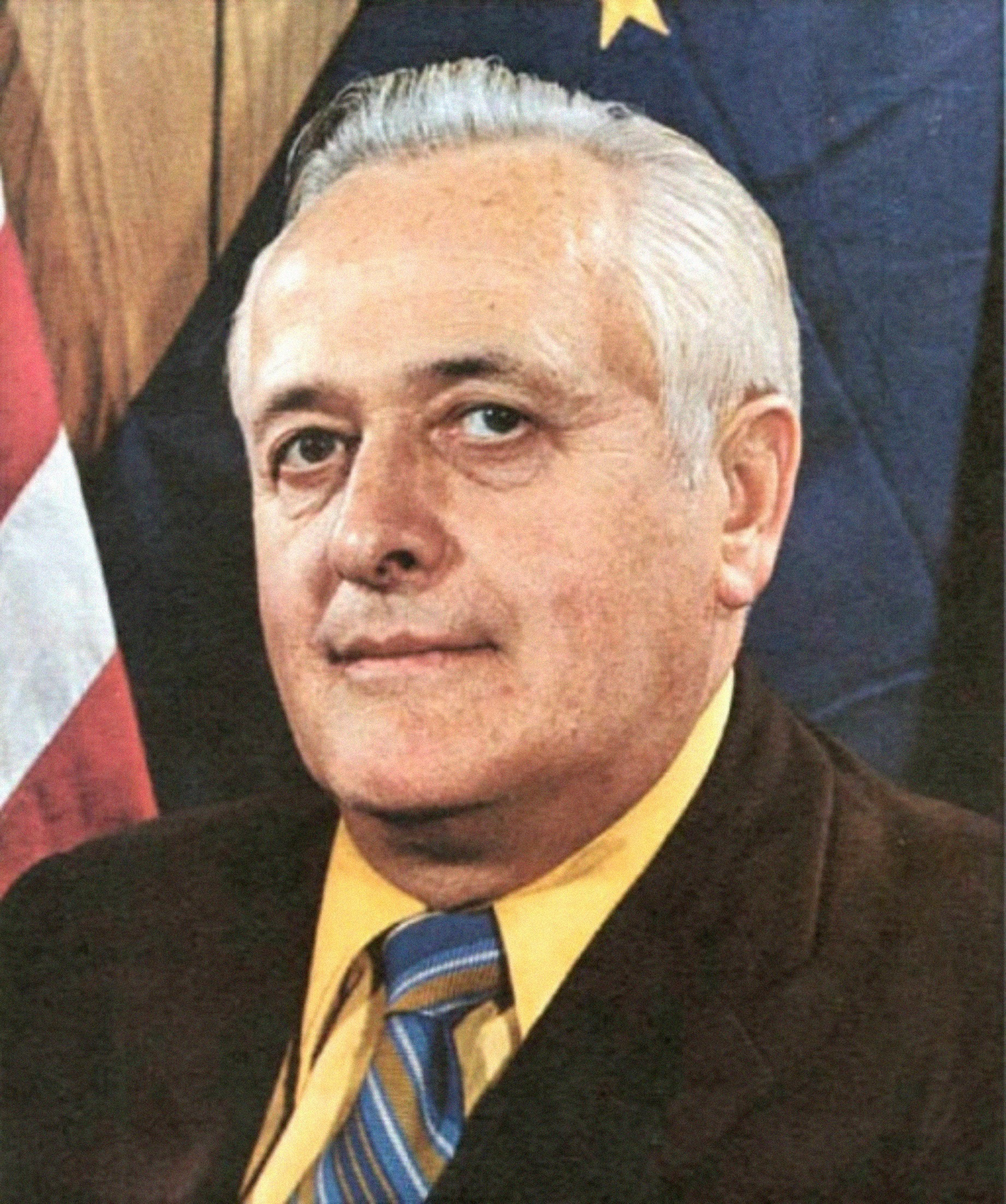
Nominee	Jay Hammond	Bill Egan
Party	Republican	Democratic
Running mate	Lowell Thomas Jr.	Red Boucher
Popular vote	45,840	45,553
Percentage	47.67%	47.37%
- Results by state house district Hammond: 40–50% 50–60% 60–70% Egan: 50–60% 60–70%
Governor before election
Bill Egan
Democratic
Elected Governor
Jay Hammond
Republican

The 1974 Alaska gubernatorial election took place on November 5, 1974, for the post of Governor of Alaska. Republican challenger and mayor of Bristol Bay Borough Jay Hammond narrowly beat Democratic incumbent Bill Egan in a close race that was forced into a recount to verify the results. The formation of the new Alaskan Independence Party was considered to have a large impact on the race. Hammond had defeated former governors Wally Hickel and Keith Harvey Miller for the Republican nomination, while Egan defeated Eben Hopson and Don Wright for the Democratic nomination.

== Arizona ==
1974 Arizona gubernatorial election
- November 5, 1974
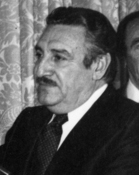

Nominee	Raúl Héctor Castro	Russell Williams
Party	Democratic	Republican
Popular vote	278,375	273,674
Percentage	50.4%	49.6%
- County results Castro: 50–60% 60–70% Williams: 50–60%
Governor before election
Jack Williams
Republican
Elected Governor
Raúl Héctor Castro
Democratic

The 1974 Arizona gubernatorial election took place on November 5, 1974. Incumbent Governor Jack Williams decided not to run for a fourth term as governor. Former United States Ambassador to Bolivia Raúl Héctor Castro, who was the Democratic nominee in 1970, won the Democratic nomination again in 1974, and narrowly won the general election, defeating Republican nominee Russell Williams by 0.85%. Castro was sworn into his first and only term as governor on January 6, 1975.

Prior to the election, there was a recall effort led by Cesar Chavez against incumbent Governor Jack Williams, with 180,000 signatures submitted. Many of the signatures were invalidated by the Attorney General Gary Nelson, but this was eventually overturned. By the time this occurred, however, it was meaningless due to the close proximity of the 1974 gubernatorial election, and thus a recall election did not occur.

Approximately two years into his term as governor, Castro would resign to become United States Ambassador to Argentina.

== Arkansas ==
1974 Arkansas gubernatorial election
- November 5, 1974
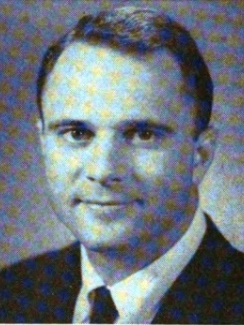

Nominee	David Pryor	Ken Coon
Party	Democratic	Republican
Popular vote	358,018	187,872
Percentage	65.57%	34.41%
- County results Pryor: 50–60% 60–70% 70–80% 80–90% Coon: 50–60%
Governor before election
Dale Bumpers
Democratic
Elected Governor
David Pryor
Democratic

The 1974 Arkansas gubernatorial election was held on November 5, 1974. Incumbent Democratic Governor Dale Bumpers retired to run for the U.S. Senate. Democratic nominee David Pryor defeated Republican nominee Ken Coon with 65.57% of the vote.

== California ==
1974 California gubernatorial election
- November 5, 1974
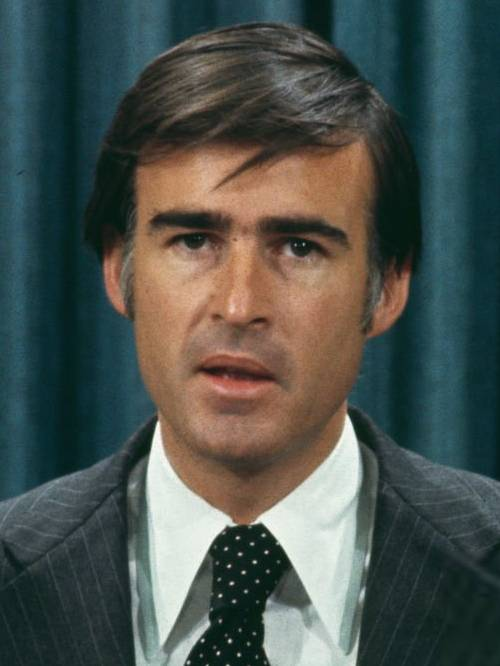

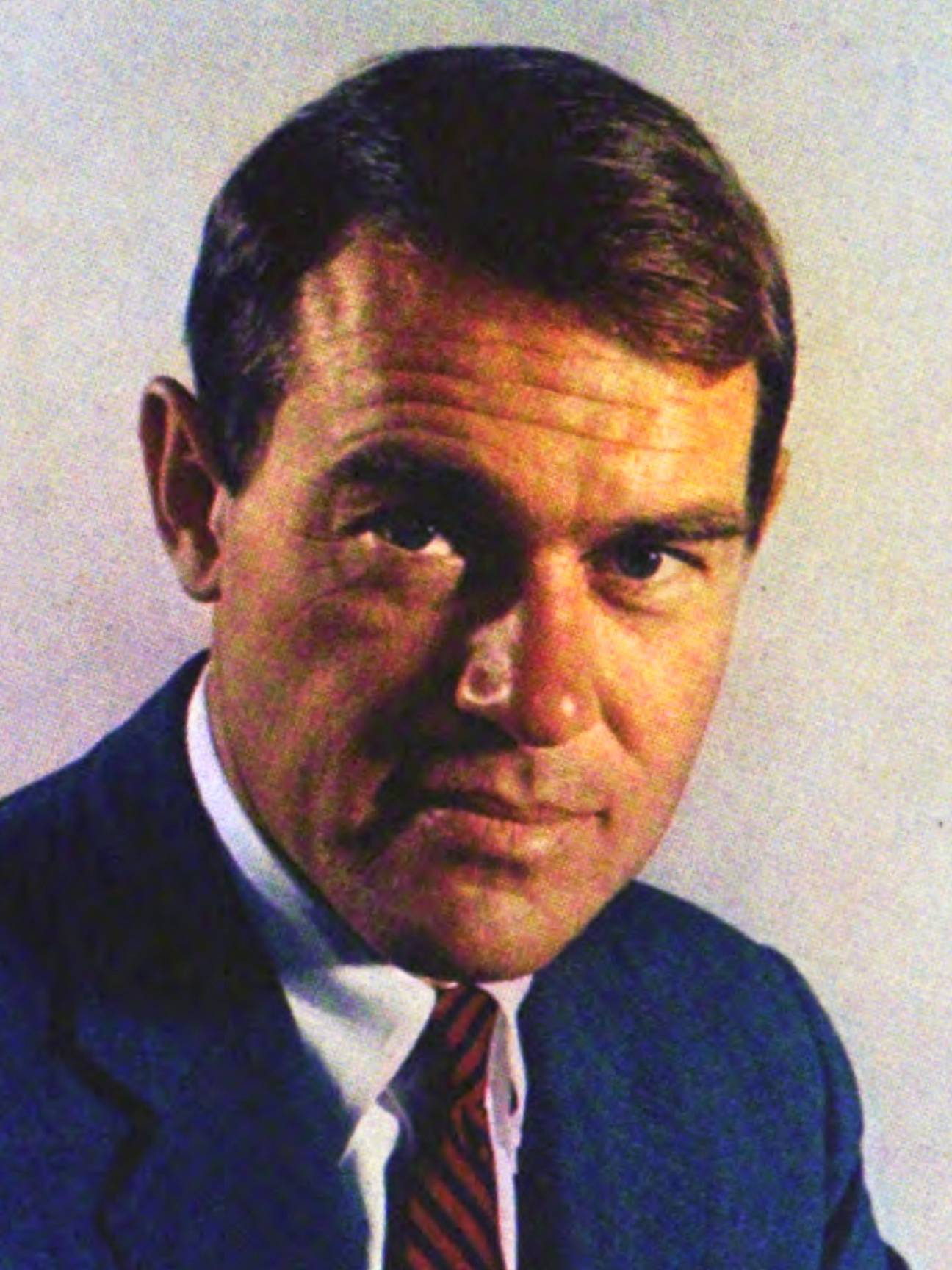
Nominee	Jerry Brown	Houston Flournoy
Party	Democratic	Republican
Popular vote	3,131,648	2,952,954
Percentage	50.11%	47.25%
- Brown: 40–50% 50–60% 60–70% 70–80% Flournoy: 40–50% 50–60% 60–70%
Governor before election
Ronald Reagan
Republican
Elected Governor
Jerry Brown
Democratic

The 1974 California gubernatorial election took place on November 5, 1974. The primary elections occurred on June 4, 1974. Incumbent Governor and former actor Ronald Reagan retired after two terms. Democratic Secretary of State Jerry Brown, son of former Governor Pat Brown, defeated Republican Controller Houston I. Flournoy in the general election. This is the first election since 1958 to not feature a Republican candidate that went on to become a U.S. president.

== Colorado ==
1974 Colorado gubernatorial election
- November 5, 1974
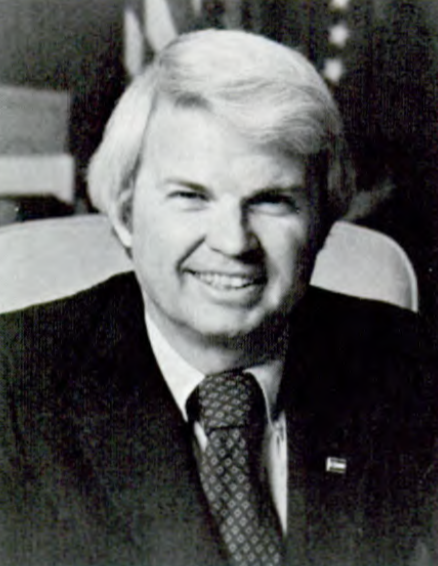

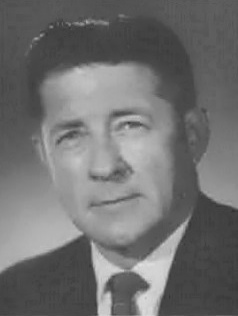
Nominee	Richard Lamm	John Vanderhoof
Party	Democratic	Republican
Running mate	George Brown	Ted Strickland
Popular vote	441,199	378,907
Percentage	53.22%	45.71%
- County results Lamm: 40–50% 50–60% 60–70% 70–80% Vanderhoof: 40–50% 50–60% 60–70%
Governor before election
John Vanderhoof
Republican
Elected Governor
Richard Lamm
Democratic

The 1974 Colorado gubernatorial election was held on November 5, 1974. Democratic nominee Richard Lamm defeated incumbent Republican John D. Vanderhoof with 53.22% of the vote.

== Connecticut ==
1974 Connecticut gubernatorial election
- November 5, 1974
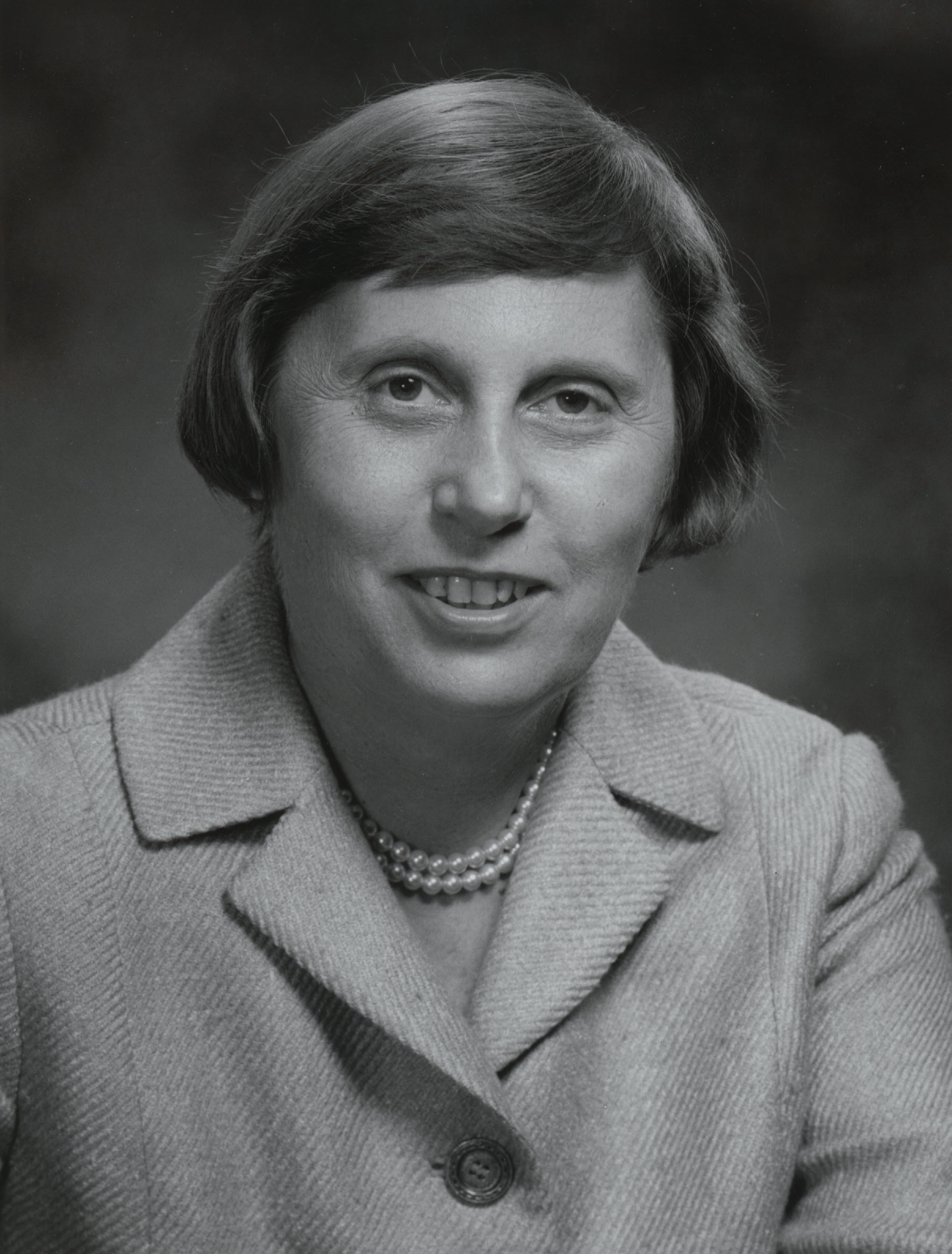

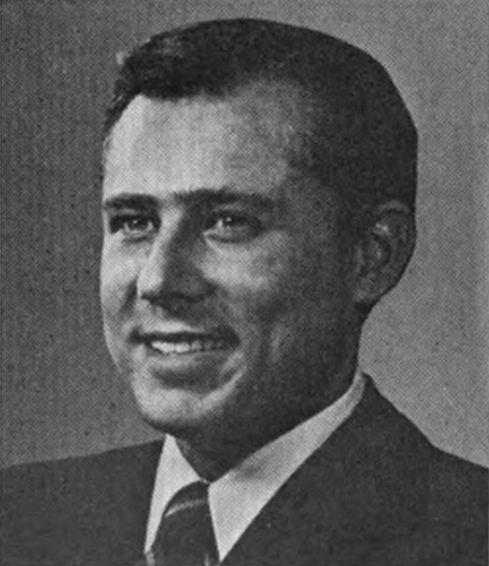
Nominee	Ella Grasso	Robert H. Steele
Party	Democratic	Republican
Running mate	Robert K. Killian	Nathan G. Agostinelli
Popular vote	643,490	440,169
Percentage	58.35%	39.92%
- Steele: 40–50% 50–60% 60–70% 70–80% Grasso: 40–50% 50–60% 60–70% 70–80% 80–90% Pallone: 70–80%
Governor before election
Thomas Meskill
Republican
Elected Governor
Ella Grasso
Democratic

The 1974 Connecticut gubernatorial election was held on November 5, 1974. Democratic nominee Ella Grasso defeated Republican nominee Robert H. Steele with 58.35% of the vote. Grasso thus became the first woman to be elected Governor of Connecticut and the first woman elected governor of a US state who was not the spouse or widow of a former Governor.

== Florida ==
1974 Florida gubernatorial election
- November 5, 1974
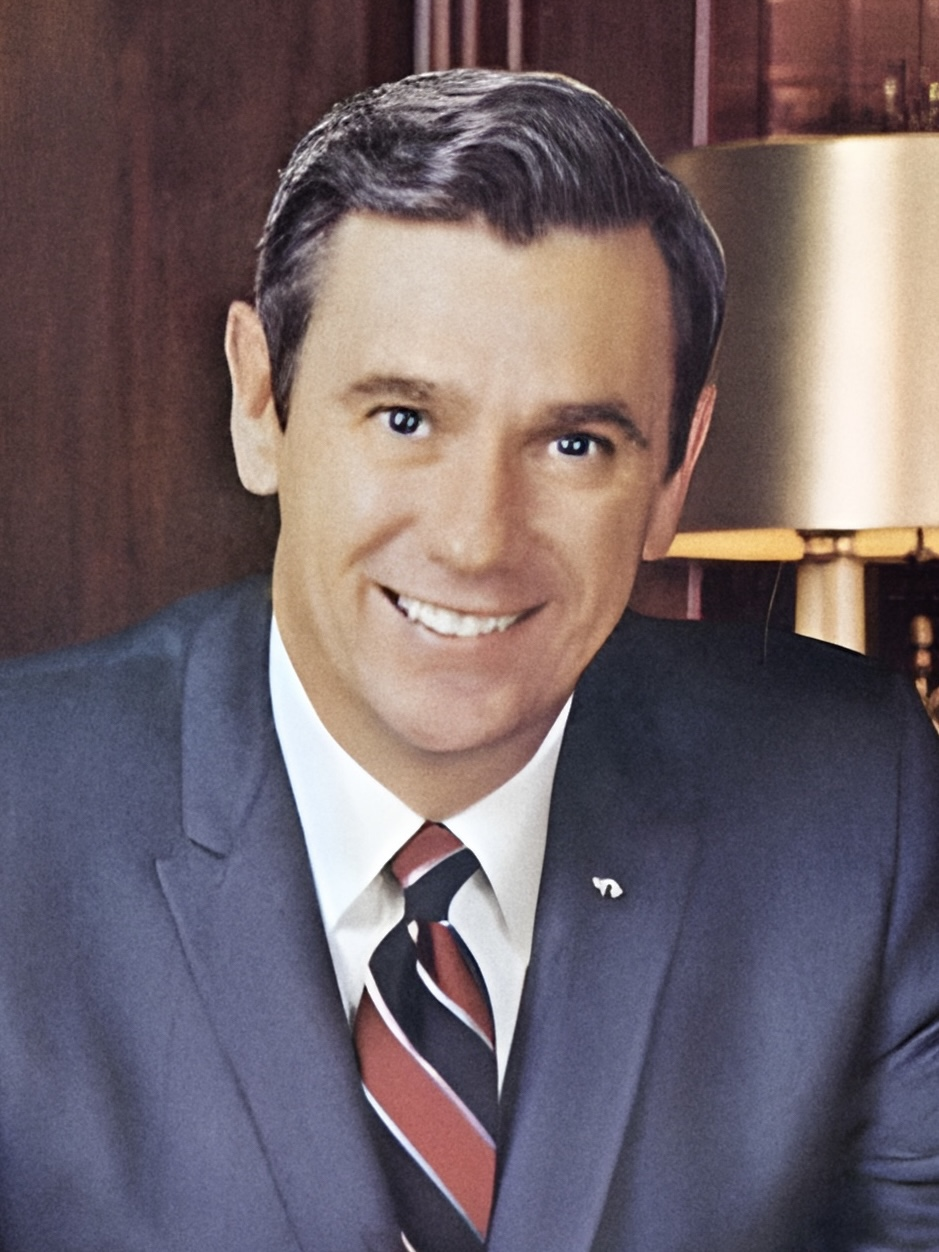

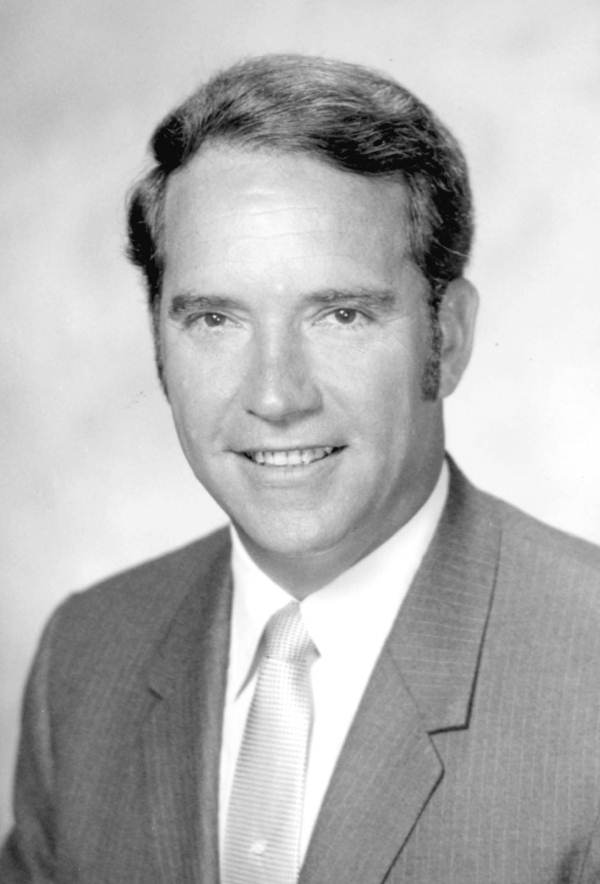
Nominee	Reubin Askew	Jerry Thomas
Party	Democratic	Republican
Running mate	J. H. Williams	Mike Thompson
Popular vote	1,118,954	709,438
Percentage	61.2%	38.8%
- County results Askew: 50–60% 60–70% 70–80% Thomas: 50–60% 60–70% 70–80%
Governor before election
Reubin Askew
Democratic
Elected Governor
Reubin Askew
Democratic

The 1974 Florida gubernatorial election took place on November 5, 1974. Incumbent Democratic Governor Reubin Askew won re-election to a second term.

== Georgia ==
1974 Georgia gubernatorial election
- November 5, 1974
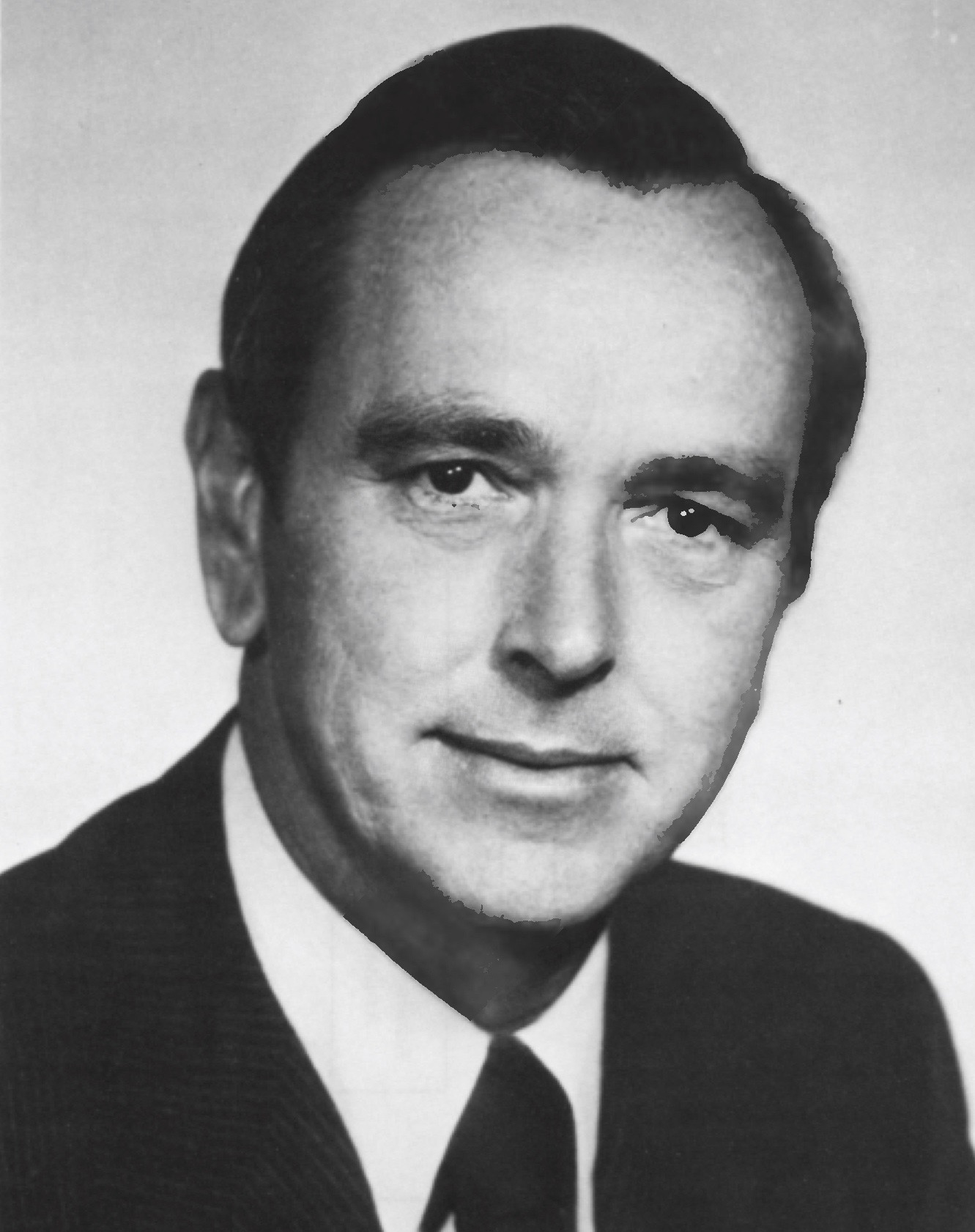

Nominee	George Busbee	Ronnie Thompson
Party	Democratic	Republican
Popular vote	646,777	289,113
Percentage	69.1%	30.9%
- County results Busbee: 50–60% 60–70% 70–80% 80–90% >90% Thompson: 50–60%
Governor before election
Jimmy Carter
Democratic
Elected Governor
George Busbee
Democratic

The 1974 Georgia gubernatorial election was held on November 5, 1974. Under Georgia's constitution at the time, incumbent Democratic governor Jimmy Carter was ineligible to serve a second consecutive term. He was elected President of the United States in the 1976 presidential election. George Busbee was elected as the 77th Governor of Georgia.

== Hawaii ==
1974 Hawaii gubernatorial election
- November 5, 1974
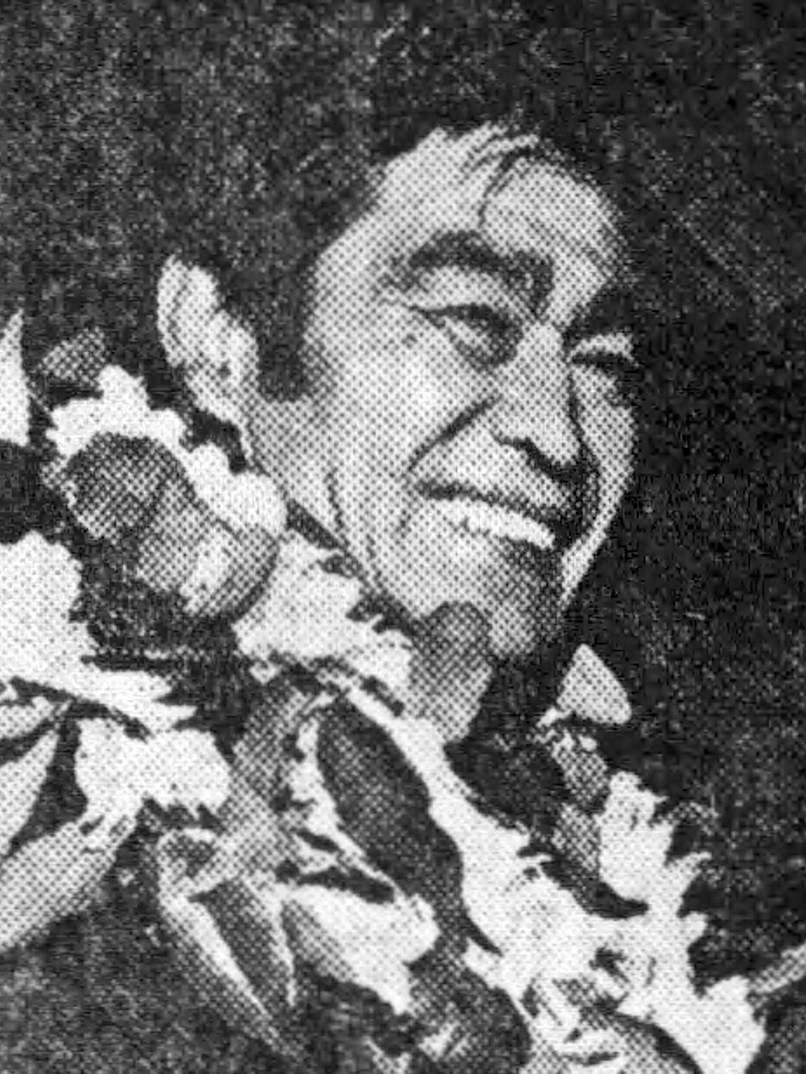

Nominee	George Ariyoshi	Randolph Crossley
Party	Democratic	Republican
Running mate	Nelson Doi	Benjamin F. Dillingham II
Popular vote	136,262	113,388
Percentage	54.6%	45.4%
- County results Ariyoshi: 50–60% 60–70%
Governor before election
John A. Burns
Democratic
Elected Governor
George Ariyoshi
Democratic

The 1974 Hawaii gubernatorial election was Hawaii's fifth gubernatorial election. The election was held on November 5, 1974, and resulted in a victory for the Democratic candidate, Lt. Gov. George Ariyoshi over Republican candidate, former State Senator Randolph Crossley. Ariyoshi received more votes than Crossley in every county in the state.

Although he was by law Lieutenant Governor of Hawaii at the time of this election, George Ariyoshi had had all the power and responsibility of the Governorship since October 26, 1973, when Governor John A. Burns was incapacitated due to illness and Ariyoshi was made acting governor.

This was Crossley's second failed attempt to win the Governorship, having previously lost the 1966 election.

== Idaho ==
1974 Idaho gubernatorial election
- November 5, 1974
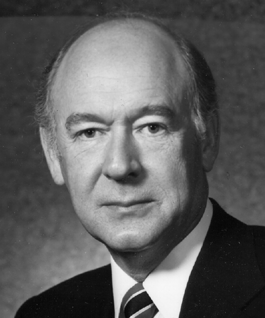

Nominee	Cecil Andrus	Jack Murphy
Party	Democratic	Republican
Popular vote	184,142	68,731
Percentage	70.92%	26.47%
- County results Andrus: 40–50% 50–60% 60–70% 70–80% 80–90% Murphy: 50–60%
Governor before election
Cecil Andrus
Democratic
Elected Governor
Cecil Andrus
Democratic

The 1974 Idaho gubernatorial election was held on Tuesday, November 5. Incumbent Democrat Cecil Andrus soundly defeated Republican nominee Jack Murphy, the lieutenant governor, with 70.92% of the vote.

== Iowa ==
1974 Iowa gubernatorial election
- November 5, 1974
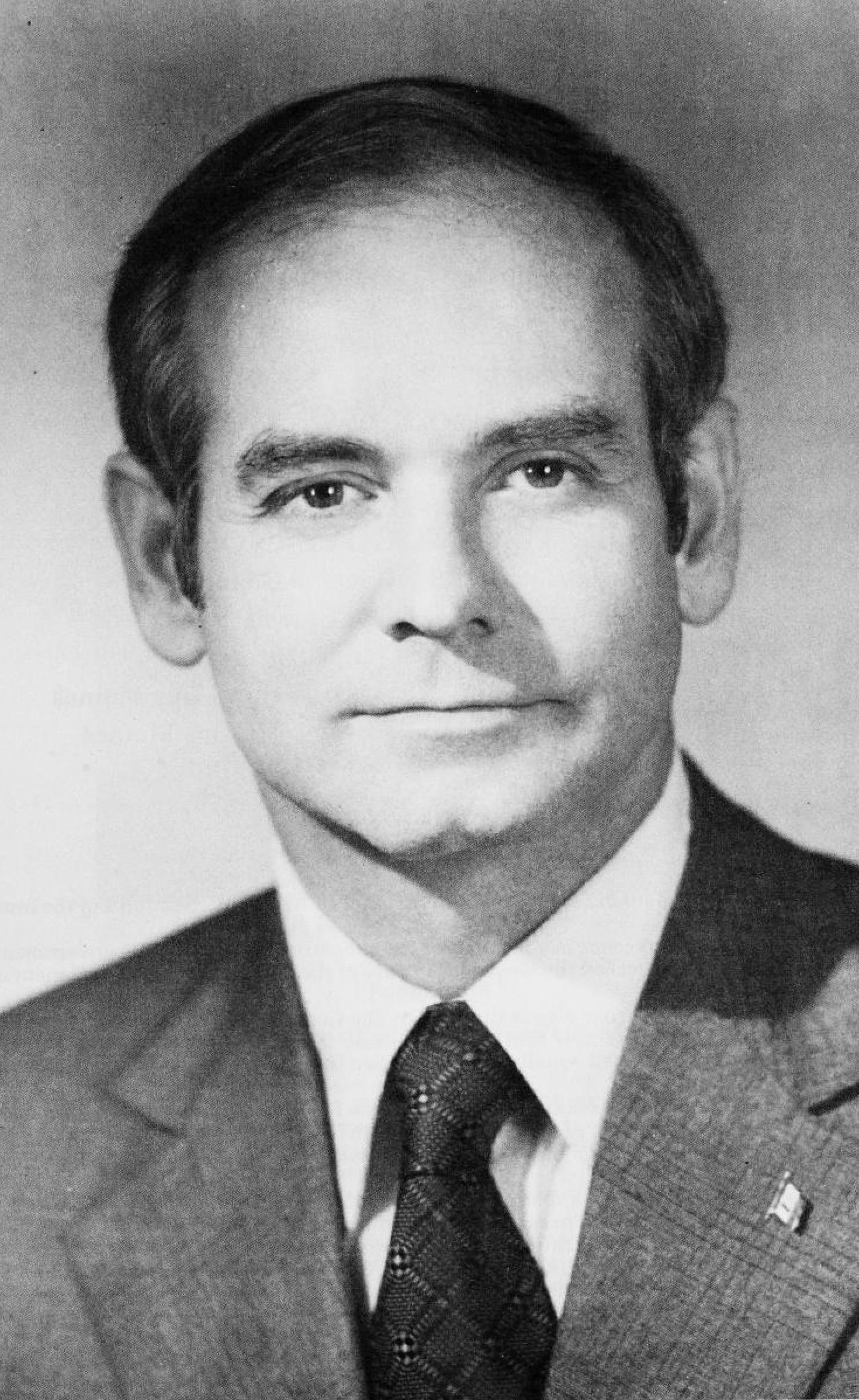

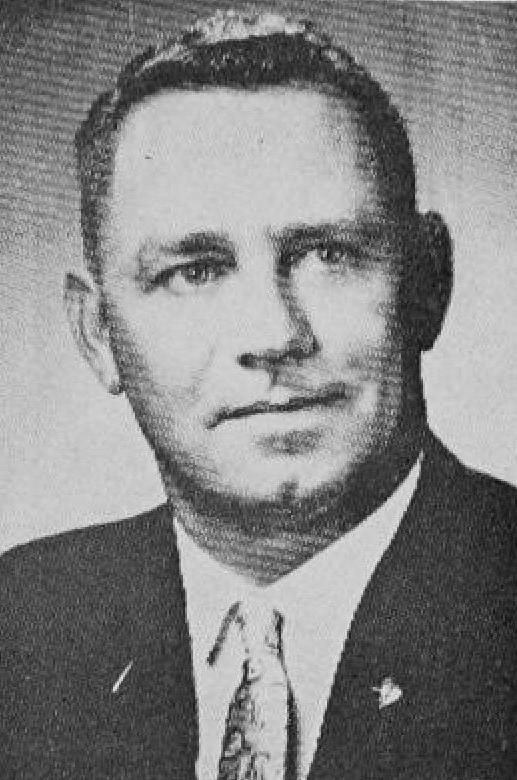
Nominee	Robert D. Ray	James Schaben
Party	Republican	Democratic
Popular vote	534,518	377,553
Percentage	58.1%	41.0%
- County results Ray: 50–60% 60–70% 70–80% Schaben: 50–60%
Governor before election
Robert D. Ray
Republican
Elected Governor
Robert D. Ray
Republican

The 1974 Iowa gubernatorial election was held on November 5, 1974. Incumbent Republican Robert D. Ray defeated Democratic nominee James Schaben with 58.07% of the vote.

== Kansas ==
1974 Kansas gubernatorial election
- November 5, 1974
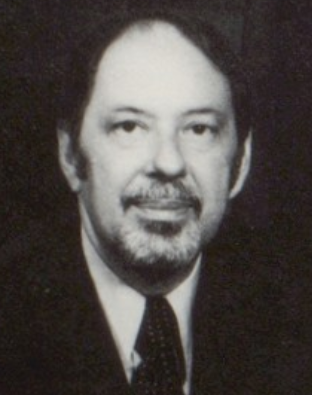

Nominee	Robert F. Bennett	Vern Miller
Party	Republican	Democratic
Running mate	Shelby Smith	Jack Steineger
Popular vote	387,792	384,115
Percentage	49.5%	49.0%
- County results Bennett: 40–50% 50–60% 60–70% Miller: 40–50% 50–60% 60–70%
Governor before election
Robert Docking
Democratic
Elected Governor
Robert Frederick Bennett
Republican

The 1974 Kansas gubernatorial election was held on November 5, 1974. Republican nominee Robert Frederick Bennett narrowly defeated Democratic nominee Vern Miller with 49.5% of the vote.

== Maine ==
1974 Maine gubernatorial election
- November 5, 1974
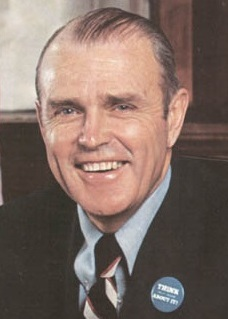

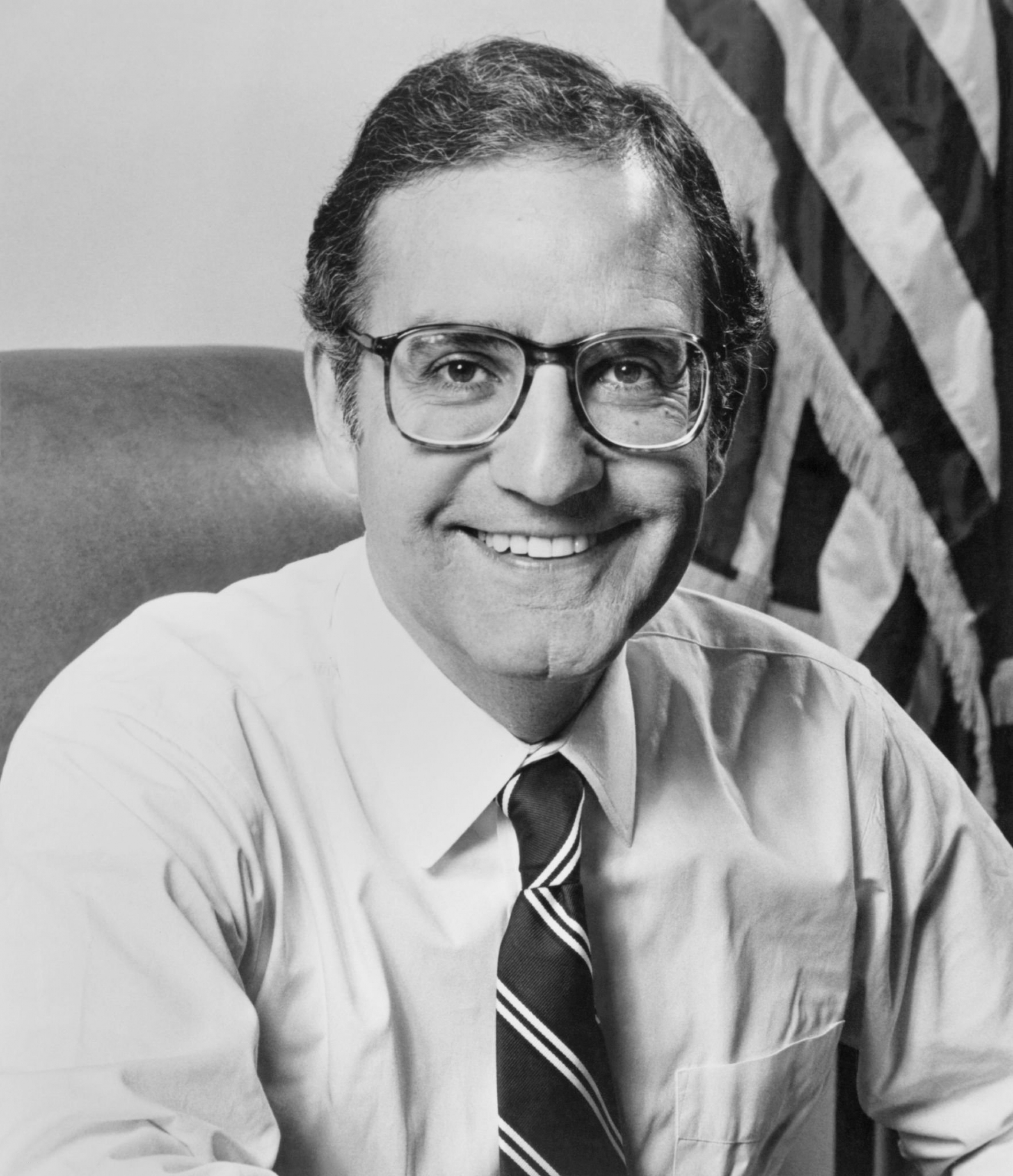

Nominee	James B. Longley	George J. Mitchell	James S. Erwin
Party	Independent	Democratic	Republican
Popular vote	142,464	132,219	84,176
Percentage	39.7%	36.8%	23.5%
- Longley: 30-40% 40-50% 50–60% 60-70% 70–80% Mitchell: 30–40% 40–50% 50–60% 60–70% 70–80% 80–90% >90% Erwin: 50–60% 60–70% 70–80% >90% Tie: 40-50%
Governor before election
Kenneth M. Curtis
Democratic
Elected Governor
James B. Longley
Independent

The 1974 Maine gubernatorial election took place on November 5, 1974. Incumbent Democratic Governor Kenneth M. Curtis was term-limited and could not seek re-election. Independent candidate James B. Longley defeated Democratic Party challenger (and future Senate Majority Leader) George J. Mitchell and Republican James Erwin in a tight three-way contest. Longley's victory made him the first independent (non-party-affiliated) governor in Maine's history.

== Maryland ==
1974 Maryland gubernatorial election
- November 5, 1974
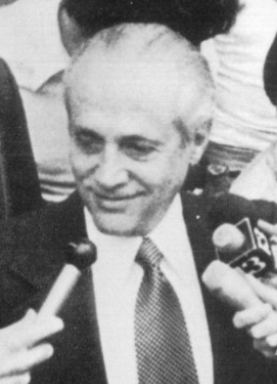

Nominee	Marvin Mandel	Louise Gore
Party	Democratic	Republican
Running mate	Blair Lee III	Frank B. Wade
Popular vote	602,648	346,449
Percentage	63.50%	36.50%
- County results Mandel: 50-60% 60-70% 70-80% Gore: 50-60%
Governor before election
Marvin Mandel
Democratic
Elected Governor
Marvin Mandel
Democratic

The 1974 Maryland gubernatorial election was held on November 5, 1974. Incumbent Democrat Marvin Mandel defeated Republican nominee Louise Gore with 63.50% of the vote.

== Massachusetts ==
1974 Massachusetts gubernatorial election
- November 5, 1974
- Turnout: 74.64% ▼0.53
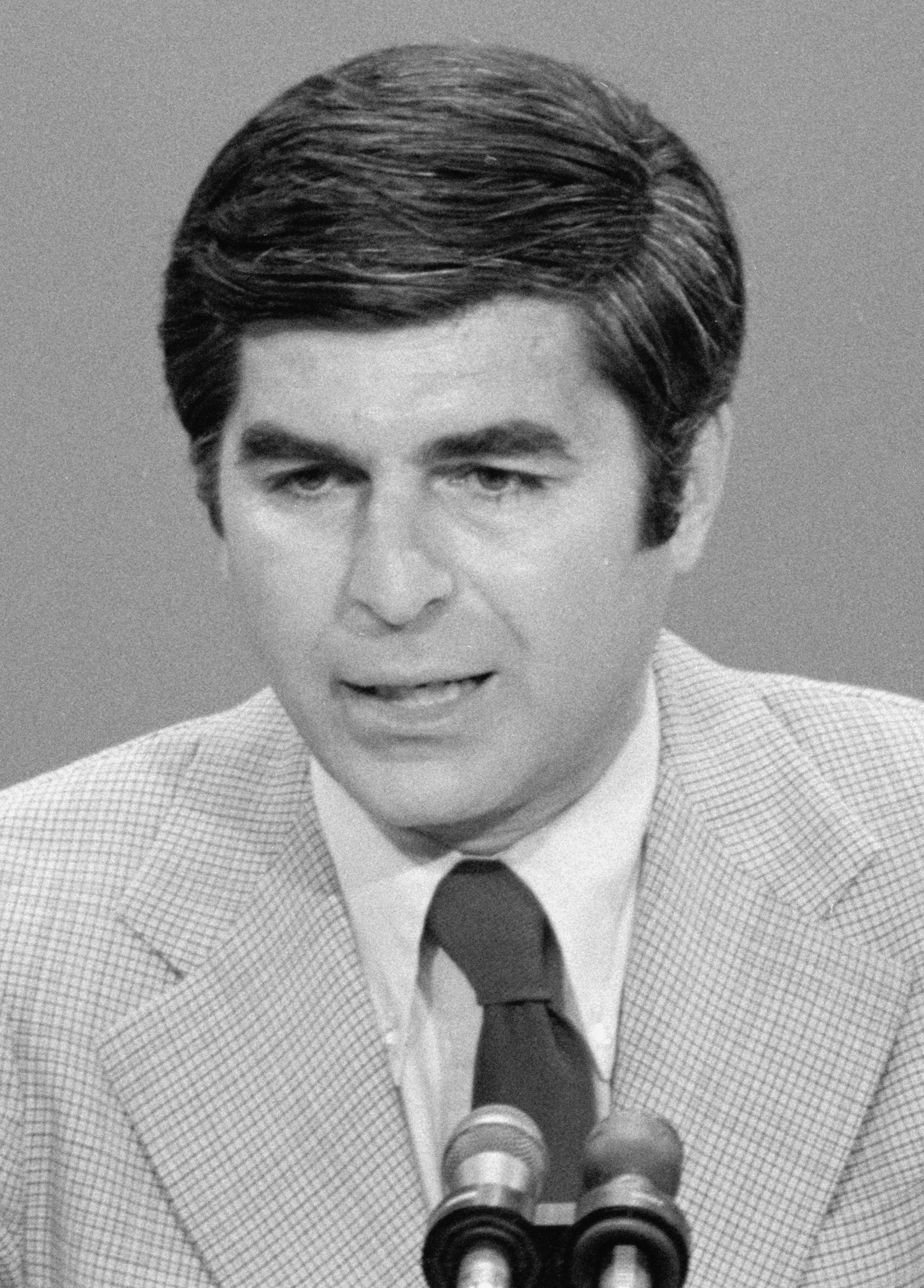

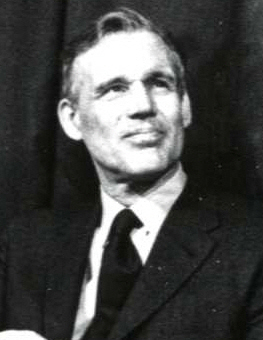
Nominee	Michael Dukakis	Francis Sargent
Party	Democratic	Republican
Running mate	Thomas O'Neill III	Donald Dwight
Popular vote	992,284	784,353
Percentage	53.50%	42.29%
- Dukakis: 30–40% 40–50% 50–60% 60–70% 70–80% Sargent: 40–50% 50–60% 60–70% 70–80% 80–90%
Governor before election
Francis Sargent
Republican
Elected Governor
Michael Dukakis
Democratic

The 1974 Massachusetts gubernatorial election was held on November 5, 1974. Michael Dukakis was elected to a four-year term, from January 2, 1975 until January 4, 1979. He defeated incumbent Governor of Massachusetts Francis W. Sargent in the general election.

== Michigan ==
1974 Michigan gubernatorial election
- November 5, 1974
- Turnout: 55.52%
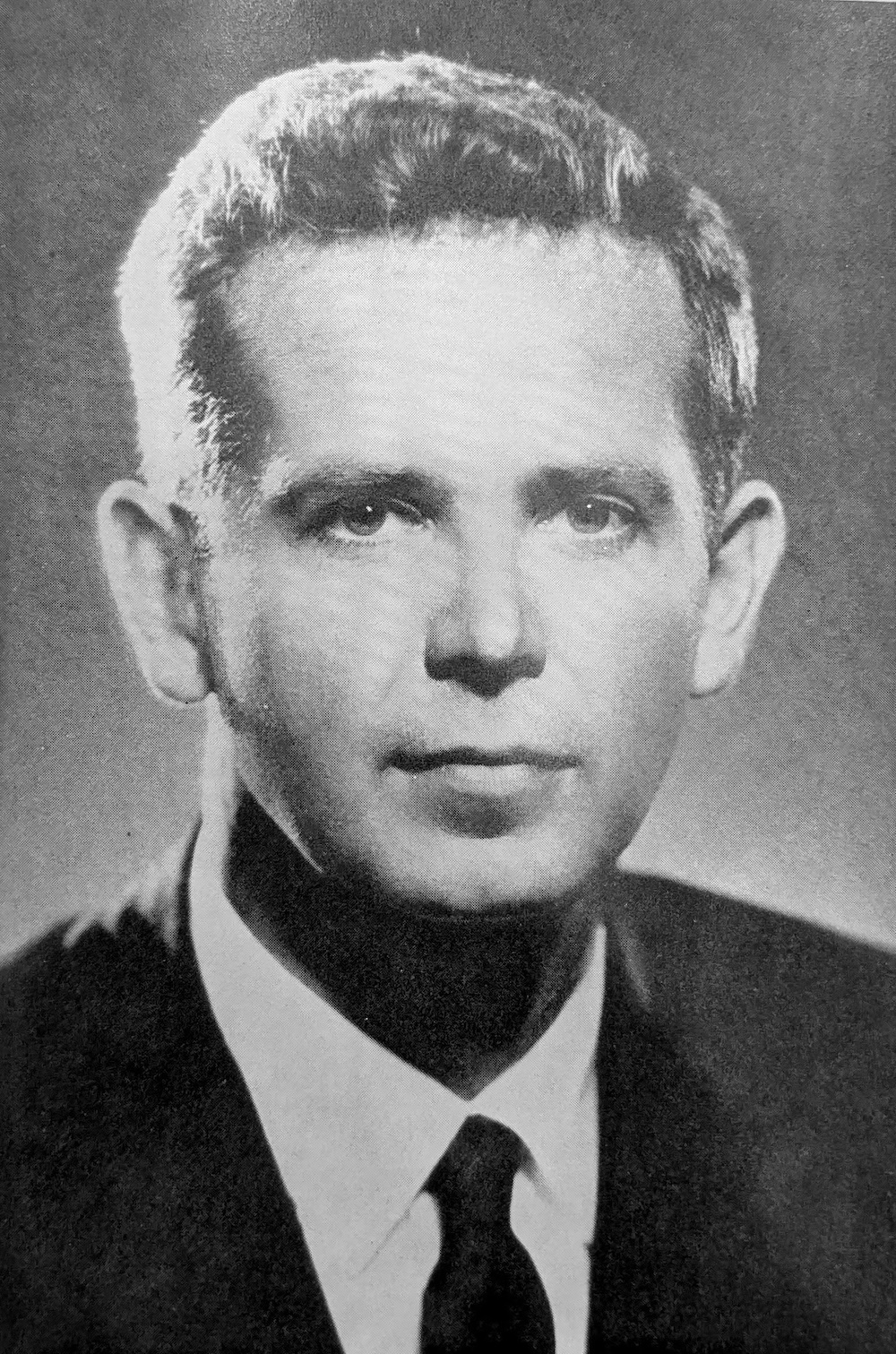

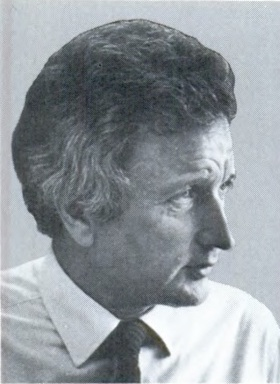
Nominee	William Milliken	Sander Levin
Party	Republican	Democratic
Running mate	James Damman	Paul Brown
Popular vote	1,356,865	1,242,247
Percentage	51.1%	46.8%
- County results Milliken: 40–50% 50–60% 60–70% Levin: 40–50% 50–60% 60–70%
Governor before election
William G. Milliken
Republican
Governor
William G. Milliken
Republican

The 1974 Michigan gubernatorial election was held on November 5, 1974. William Milliken was elected to his second term as Governor of Michigan in a rematch with Sander Levin. This was the last time until 1990 that the state elected a governor of the same party as the sitting president.

== Minnesota ==
1974 Minnesota gubernatorial election
- November 5, 1974
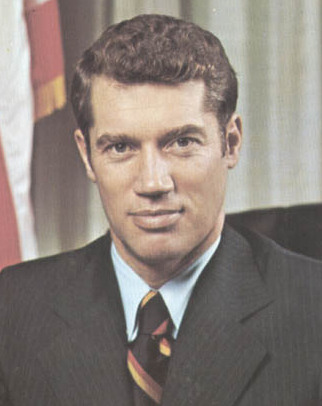

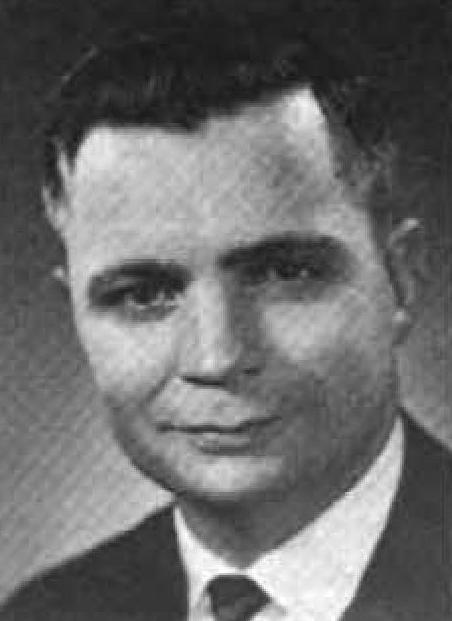
Nominee	Wendell Anderson	John W. Johnson
Party	Democratic (DFL)	Republican
Running mate	Rudy Perpich	Dwaine Hoberg
Popular vote	786,787	376,722
Percentage	62.80%	29.35%
- County results Anderson: 40–50% 50–60% 60–70% 70–80%
Governor before election
Wendell Anderson
Democratic (DFL)
Elected Governor
Wendell Anderson
Democratic (DFL)

The 1974 Minnesota gubernatorial election took place on November 5, 1974. The 1974 election was the first election where the Governor and Lieutenant Governor ran on the same ticket. Minnesota Democratic–Farmer–Labor Party candidate Wendell Anderson defeated Republican Party of Minnesota challenger John W. Johnson.

== Nebraska ==
1974 Nebraska gubernatorial election
- November 5, 1974
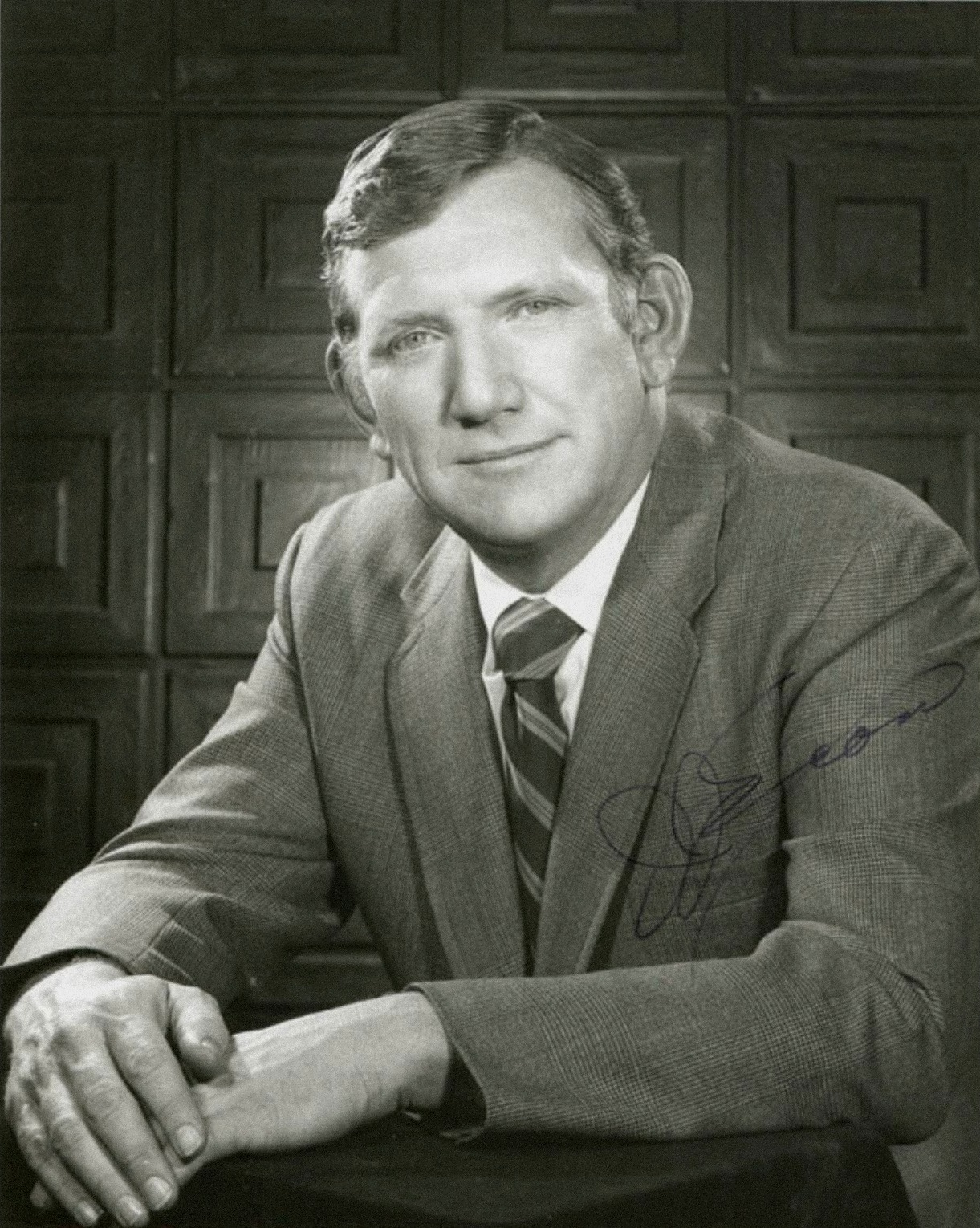

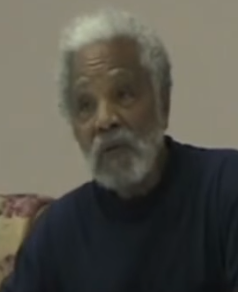
Nominee	J. James Exon	Richard D. Marvel	Ernie Chambers (Write-in)
Party	Democratic	Republican	Independent
Running mate	Gerald Whelan	Anne S. Batchelder
Popular vote	267,012	159,780	24,320
Percentage	59.2%	35.4%	5.4%
- County results Exon: 40–50% 50–60% 60–70% 70–80% Marvel: 40–50% 50–60%
Governor before election
J. James Exon
Democratic
Elected Governor
J. James Exon
Democratic

The 1974 Nebraska gubernatorial election was held on November 5, 1974, and featured incumbent Governor J. James Exon, a Democrat, defeating Republican nominee, state Senator Richard D. Marvel. Independent state Senator Ernie Chambers also captured 5% of the vote as a write-in candidate. This was the first gubernatorial election in Nebraska in which the nominees for Governor and Lieutenant Governor ran as a single ticket in the general election, though they were chosen in separate primary elections.

== Nevada ==
1974 Nevada gubernatorial election
- November 5, 1974
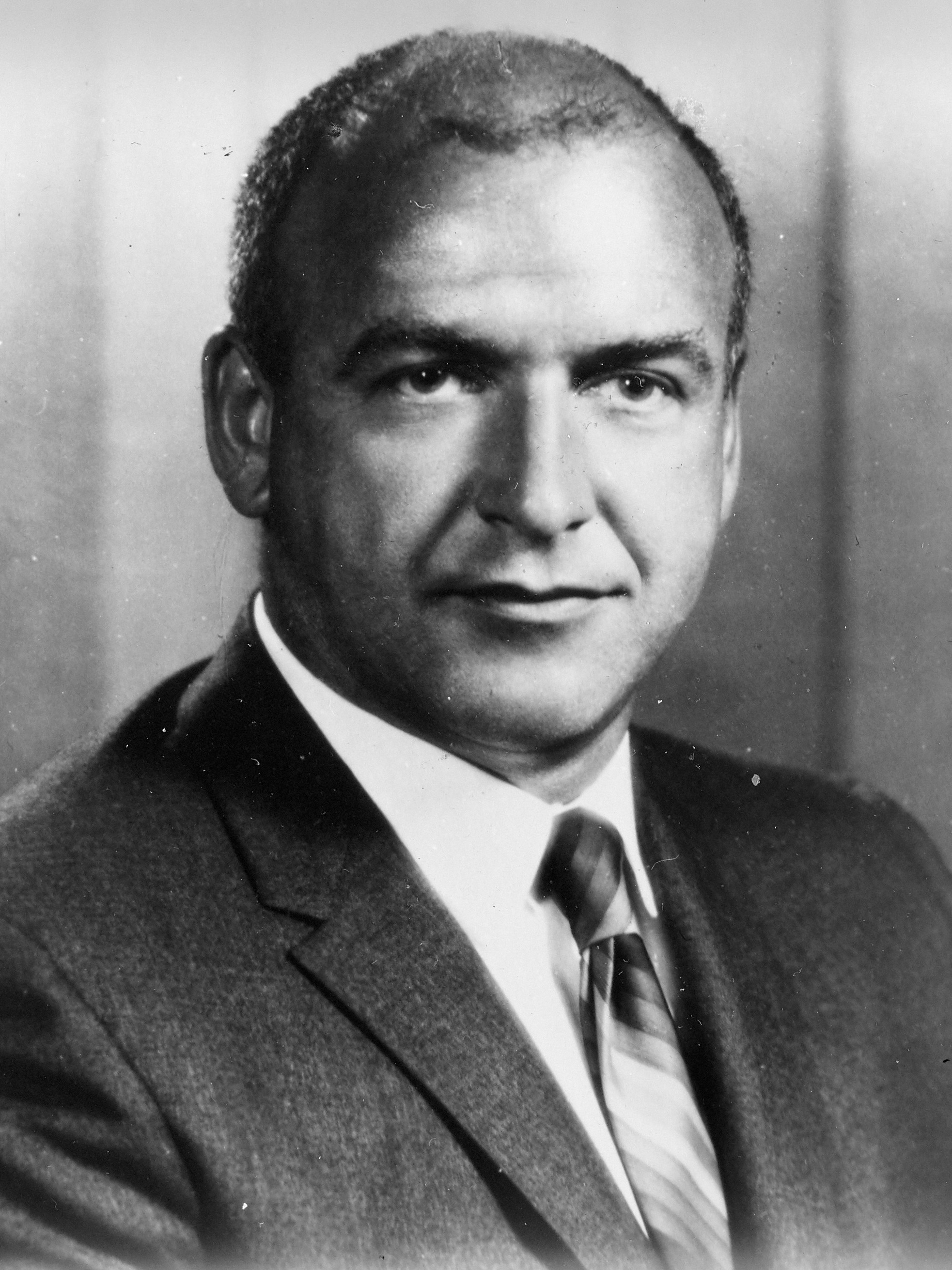

Nominee	Mike O'Callaghan	Shirley Crumpler	James Houston
Party	Democratic	Republican	Independent American
Popular vote	114,114	28,959	26,285
Percentage	67.38%	17.10%	15.52%
- County results O'Callaghan: 50–60% 60–70% 70–80% 80–90%
Governor before election
Mike O'Callaghan
Democratic
Elected Governor
Mike O'Callaghan
Democratic

The 1974 Nevada gubernatorial election occurred on November 5, 1974. Incumbent Democrat Mike O'Callaghan successfully ran for re-election to a second term as Governor of Nevada, defeating Republican nominee Shirley Crumpler and Independent American nominee James Hay Houston.

== New Hampshire ==
1974 New Hampshire gubernatorial election
- November 5, 1974
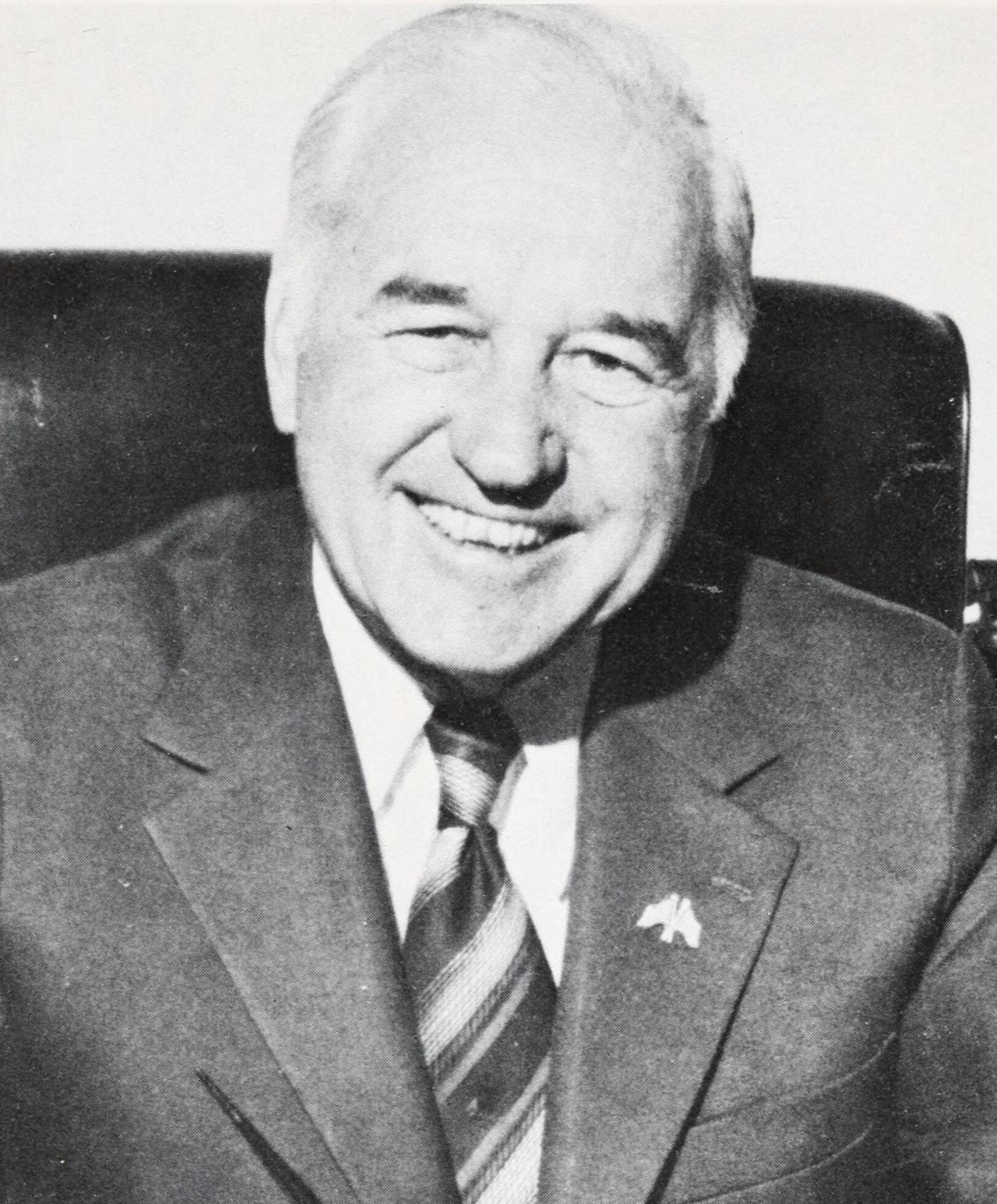

Nominee	Meldrim Thomson Jr.	Richard W. Leonard
Party	Republican	Democratic
Popular vote	115,933	110,591
Percentage	51.15%	48.79%
- Thomson: 40–50% 50–60% 60–70% 70–80% 80–90% >90% Leonard: 50–60% 60–70% 70–80% 80–90% No Data/Vote
Governor before election
Meldrim Thomson Jr.
Republican
Elected Governor
Meldrim Thomson Jr.
Republican

The 1974 New Hampshire gubernatorial election was held on November 5, 1974. Incumbent Republican Governor Meldrim Thomson Jr. defeated Democratic nominee Richard W. Leonard with 51.15% of the vote.

== New Mexico ==
1974 New Mexico gubernatorial election
- November 5, 1974
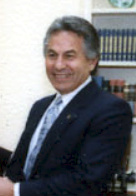

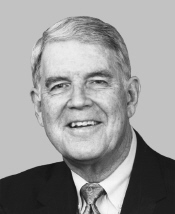
Nominee	Jerry Apodaca	Joe Skeen
Party	Democratic	Republican
Popular vote	164,172	160,430
Percentage	49.94%	48.80%
- County results Apodaca: 50–60% 60–70% 70–80% Skeen: 50–60% 60–70%
Governor before election
Bruce King
Democratic
Elected Governor
Jerry Apodaca
Democratic

The 1974 New Mexico gubernatorial election took place on November 5, 1974, in order to elect the Governor of New Mexico. Due to term limits, incumbent Democrat Bruce King was ineligible to seek a second term as governor. Democrat Jerry Apodaca narrowly defeated Republican Joe Skeen. This election saw Hidalgo County vote for a Republican gubernatorial candidate for the first time ever.

== New York ==
1974 New York gubernatorial election
- November 5, 1974
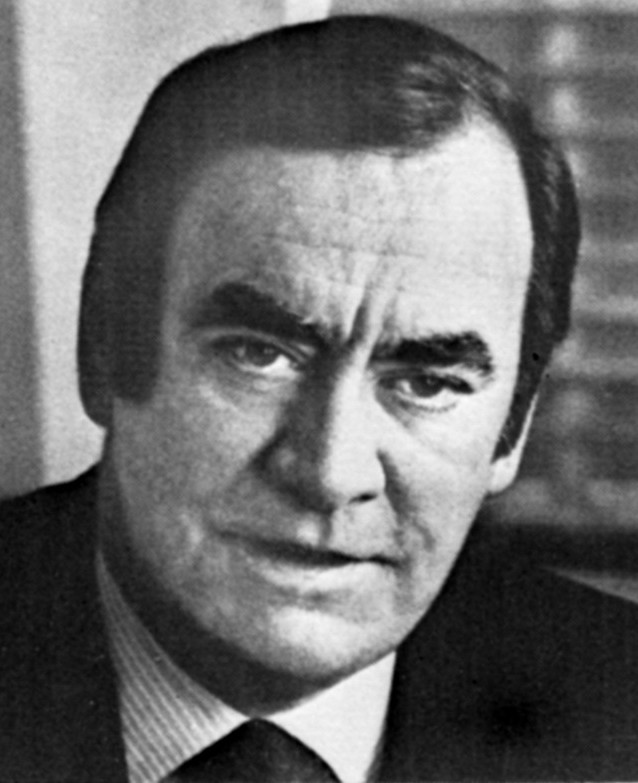

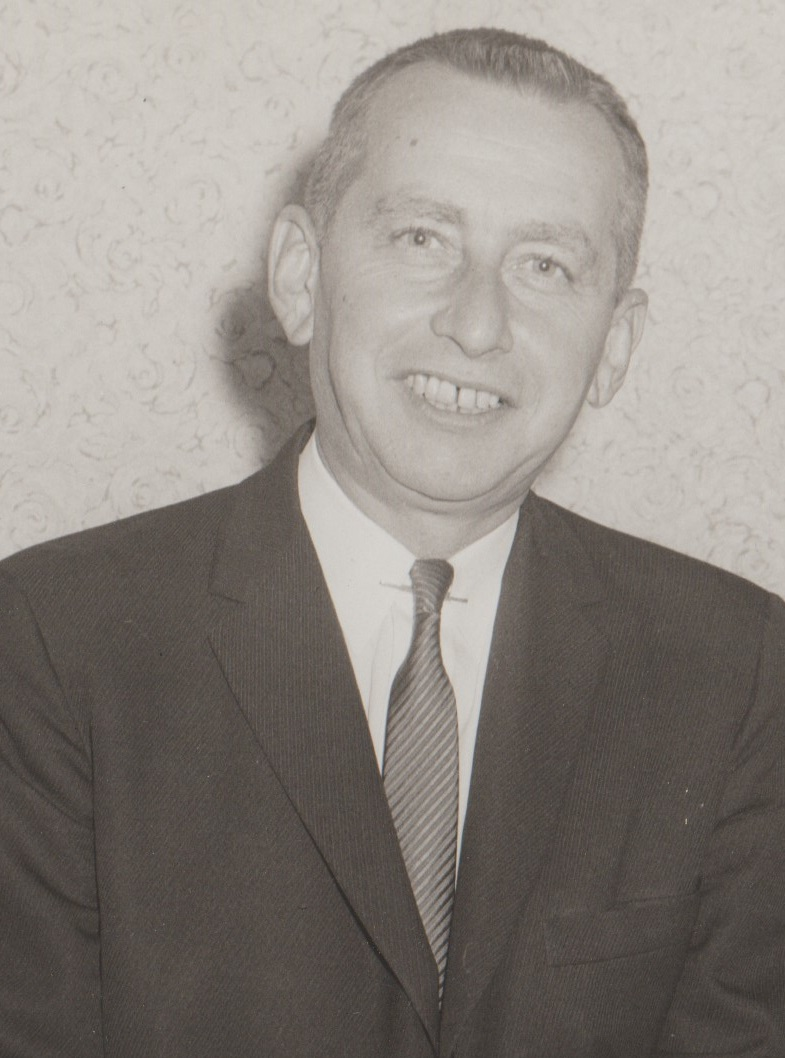
Nominee	Hugh Carey	Malcolm Wilson
Party	Democratic	Republican
Alliance	Liberal	Conservative
Running mate	Mary Anne Krupsak	Ralph G. Caso
Popular vote	3,028,503	2,219,667
Percentage	57.22%	41.94%
- County results Carey: 50–60% 60–70% 70–80% Wilson: 40–50% 50–60% 60–70%
Governor before election
Malcolm Wilson
Republican
Elected Governor
Hugh Carey
Democratic

The 1974 New York gubernatorial election was held on November 5, 1974 to elect the Governor and Lieutenant Governor of New York. Incumbent Republican governor Malcolm Wilson, who had ascended to the governorship following Nelson Rockefeller's resignation to begin work with the Commission on Critical Choices for Americans in 1973, was defeated by Democratic Hugh Carey. Carey became the first Democratic Governor of New York since W. Averell Harriman left office in 1958 after suffering defeat from Nelson Rockefeller in the election that same year.

== Ohio ==
1974 Ohio gubernatorial election
- November 5, 1974
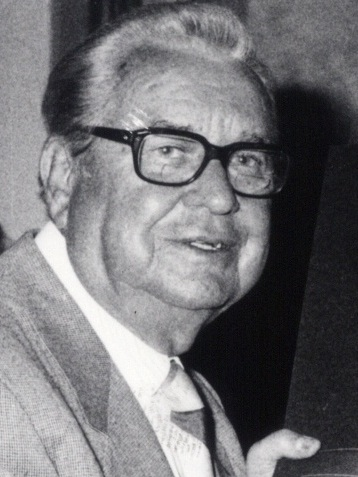

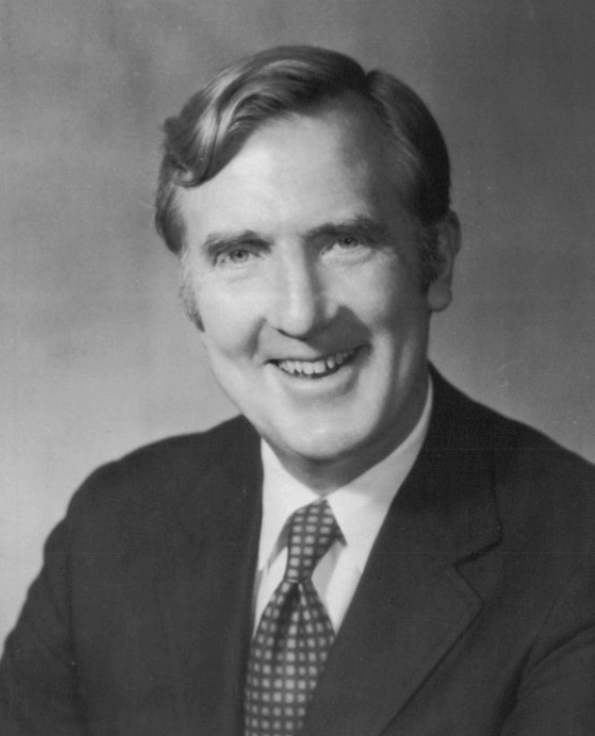
Nominee	Jim Rhodes	John J. Gilligan
Party	Republican	Democratic
Popular vote	1,493,679	1,482,191
Percentage	48.62%	48.25%
- County results Rhodes: 40-50% 50-60% 60-70% 70-80% Gilligan: 40-50% 50-60% 60-70%
Governor before election
John J. Gilligan
Democratic
Elected Governor
Jim Rhodes
Republican

The 1974 Ohio gubernatorial election was held on November 5, 1974. Republican nominee Jim Rhodes narrowly defeated Democratic incumbent John J. Gilligan with 48.62% of the vote.

== Oklahoma ==
1974 Oklahoma gubernatorial election
- November 5, 1974
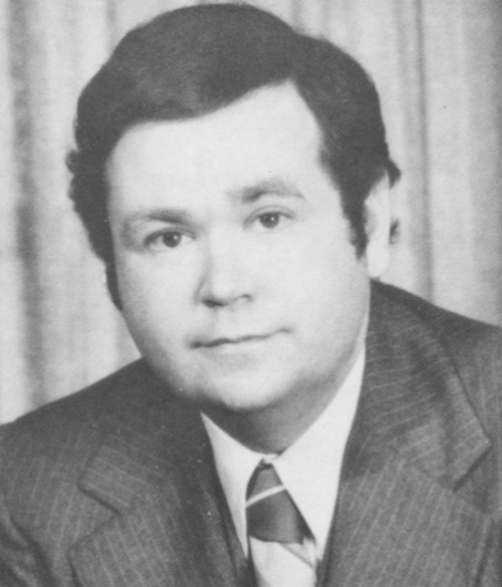

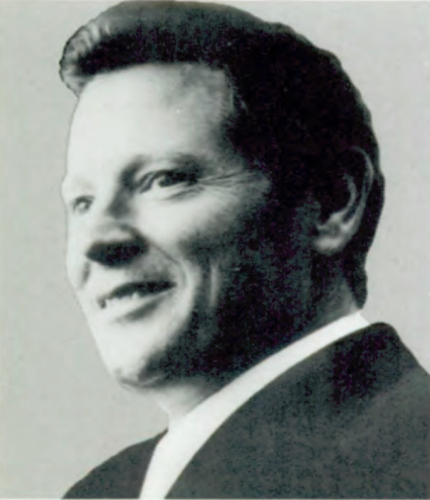
Nominee	David Boren	Jim Inhofe
Party	Democratic	Republican
Popular vote	514,389	290,459
Percentage	63.9%	36.1%
- County results Boren: 50–60% 60–70% 70–80% 80–90% >90% Inhofe: 50–60%
Governor before election
David Hall
Democratic
Elected Governor
David Boren
Democratic

The 1974 Oklahoma gubernatorial election was held on November 5, 1974, and was a race for Governor of Oklahoma. Democrat David Boren defeated Clem McSpadden in a run-off to claim his party's nomination after embattled incumbent David Hall was eliminated in the initial primary. Boren won the general election handily over Republican Jim Inhofe., who later won a 1994 U.S. Senate special election triggered by Boren's impending resignation to become the University of Oklahoma's president.

== Oregon ==
1974 Oregon gubernatorial election
- November 5, 1974
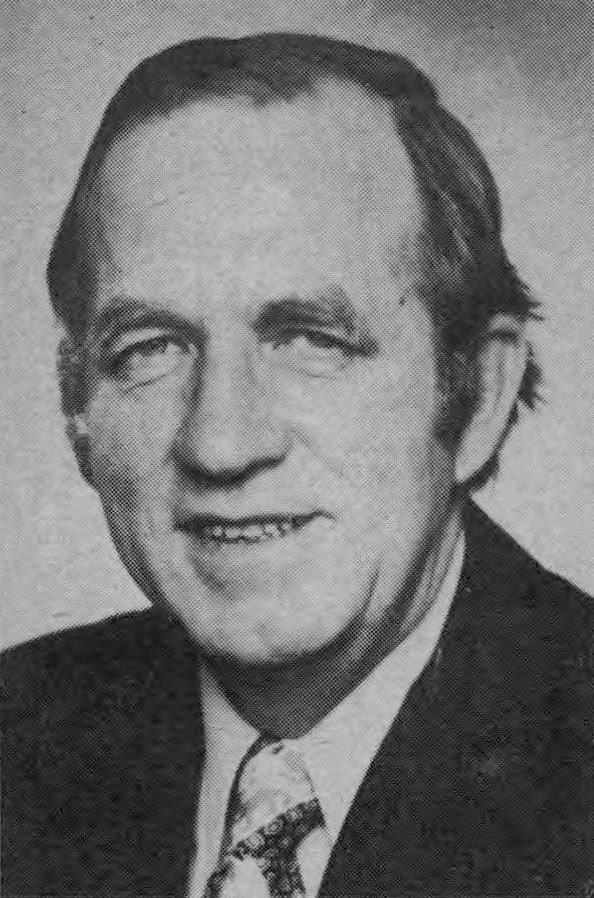

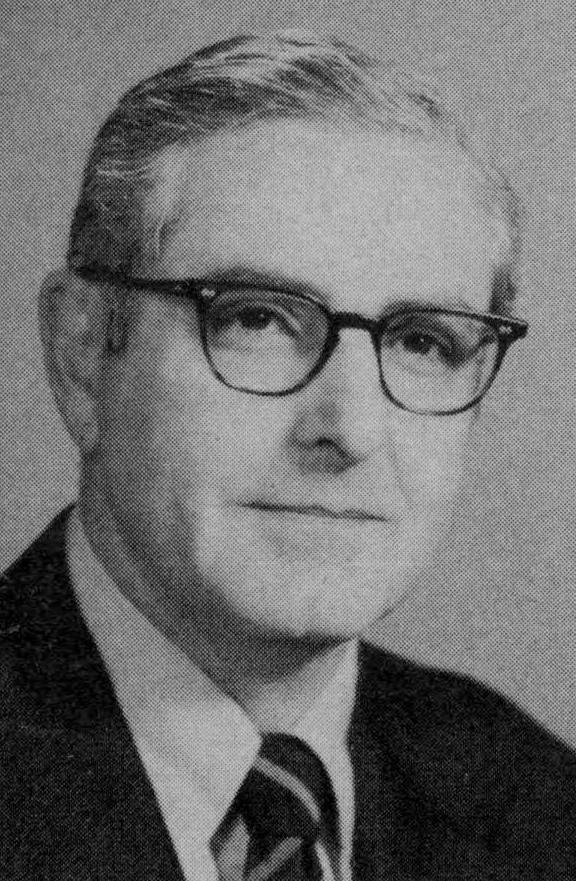
Nominee	Robert Straub	Victor Atiyeh
Party	Democratic	Republican
Popular vote	444,812	324,751
Percentage	57.7%	42.1%
- County results: Straub: 50–60% 60–70% Atiyeh: 50–60% 60–70%
Governor before election
Tom McCall
Republican
Elected Governor
Robert Straub
Democratic

The 1974 Oregon gubernatorial election took place on November 5, 1974. Democratic nominee Robert Straub, endorsed by the outgoing governor Tom McCall, defeated Republican nominee Victor Atiyeh.

== Pennsylvania ==
1974 Pennsylvania gubernatorial election
- November 5, 1974
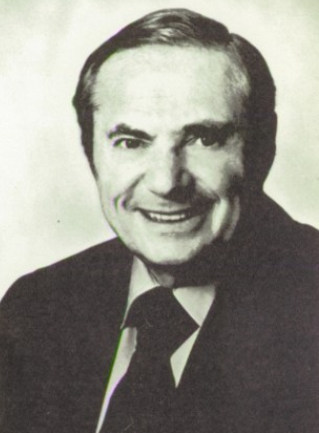

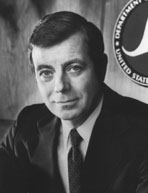
Nominee	Milton Shapp	Drew Lewis
Party	Democratic	Republican
Running mate	Ernie Kline	Ken Lee
Popular vote	1,878,252	1,578,917
Percentage	53.66%	45.11%
- County results Shapp: 40–50% 50–60% 60–70% Lewis: 40–50% 50–60% 60–70%
Governor before election
Milton Shapp
Democratic
Elected Governor
Milton Shapp
Democratic

The 1974 Pennsylvania gubernatorial election was held on November 5. Incumbent Democratic Governor Milton Shapp defeated Republican Drew Lewis. Under the state's 1968 constitution, Shapp was the first governor who was eligible to run for consecutive terms.

== Rhode Island ==
1974 Rhode Island gubernatorial election
- November 5, 1974
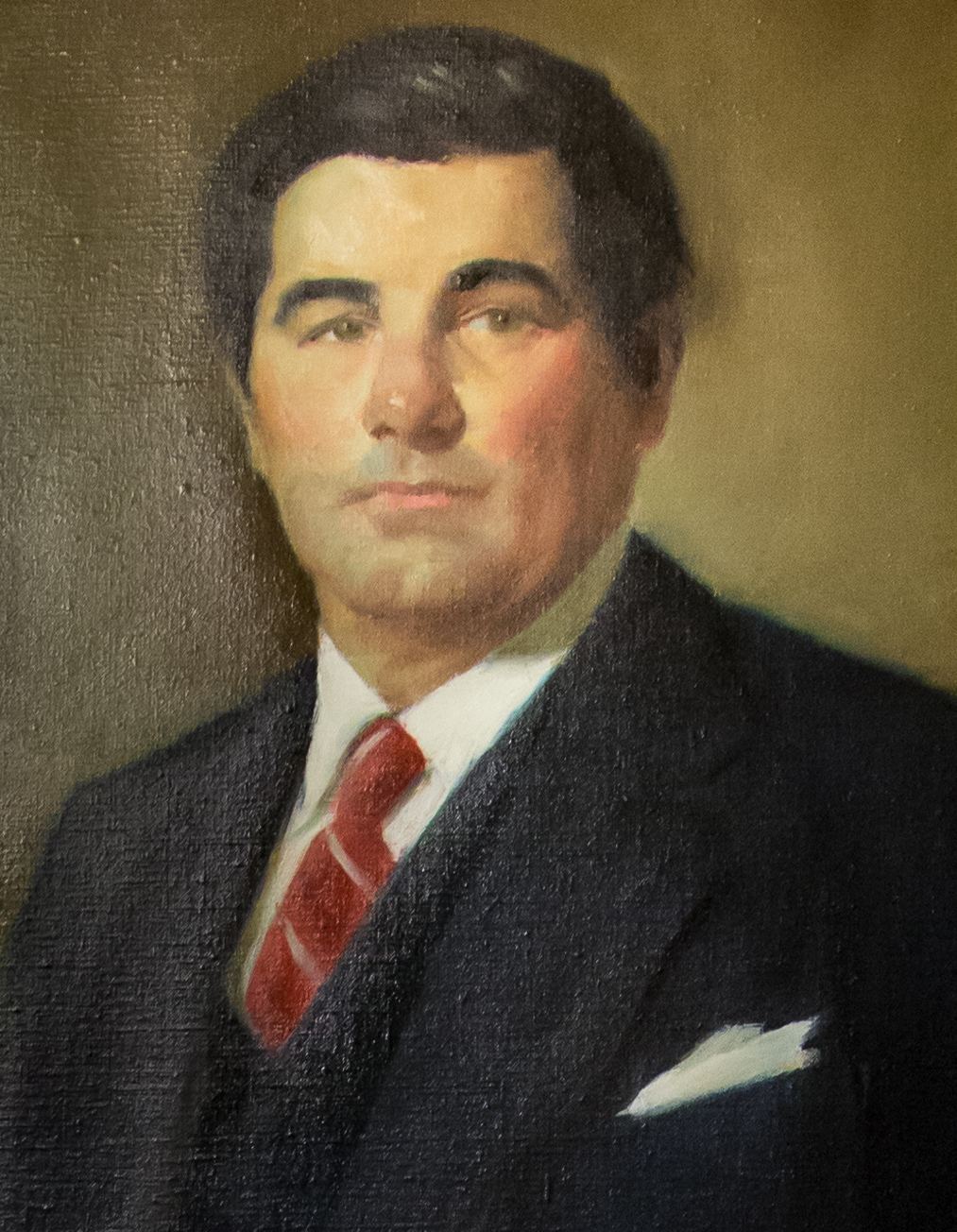

Nominee	Philip Noel	James W. Nugent
Party	Democratic	Republican
Popular vote	252,436	69,224
Percentage	78.48%	21.52%
- Noel: 60–70% 70–80% 80–90%
Governor before election
Philip Noel
Democratic
Elected Governor
Philip Noel
Democratic

The 1974 Rhode Island gubernatorial election was held on November 5, 1974. Incumbent Democrat Philip Noel defeated Republican nominee James W. Nugent with 78.48% of the vote.

== South Carolina ==
1974 South Carolina gubernatorial election
- November 5, 1974
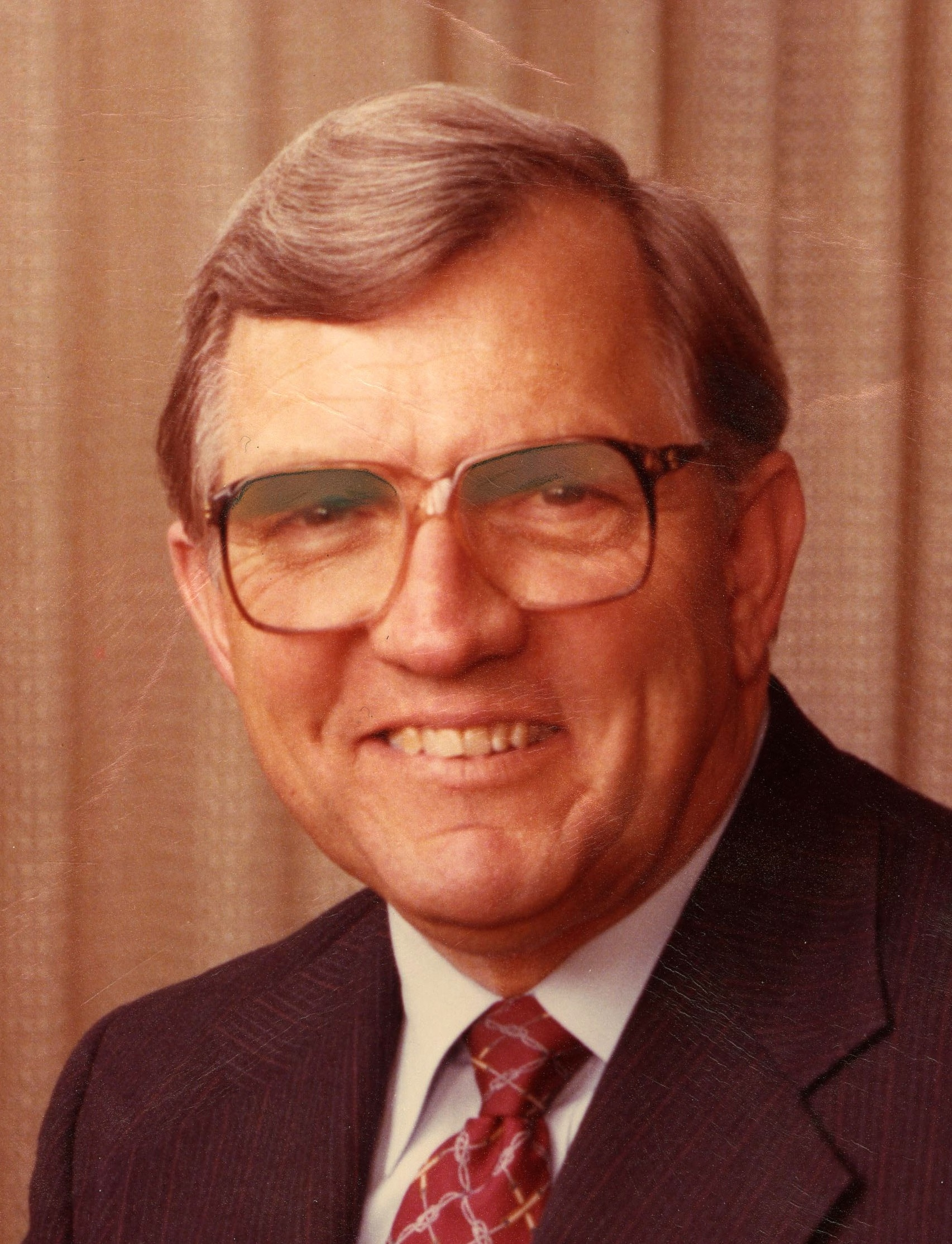

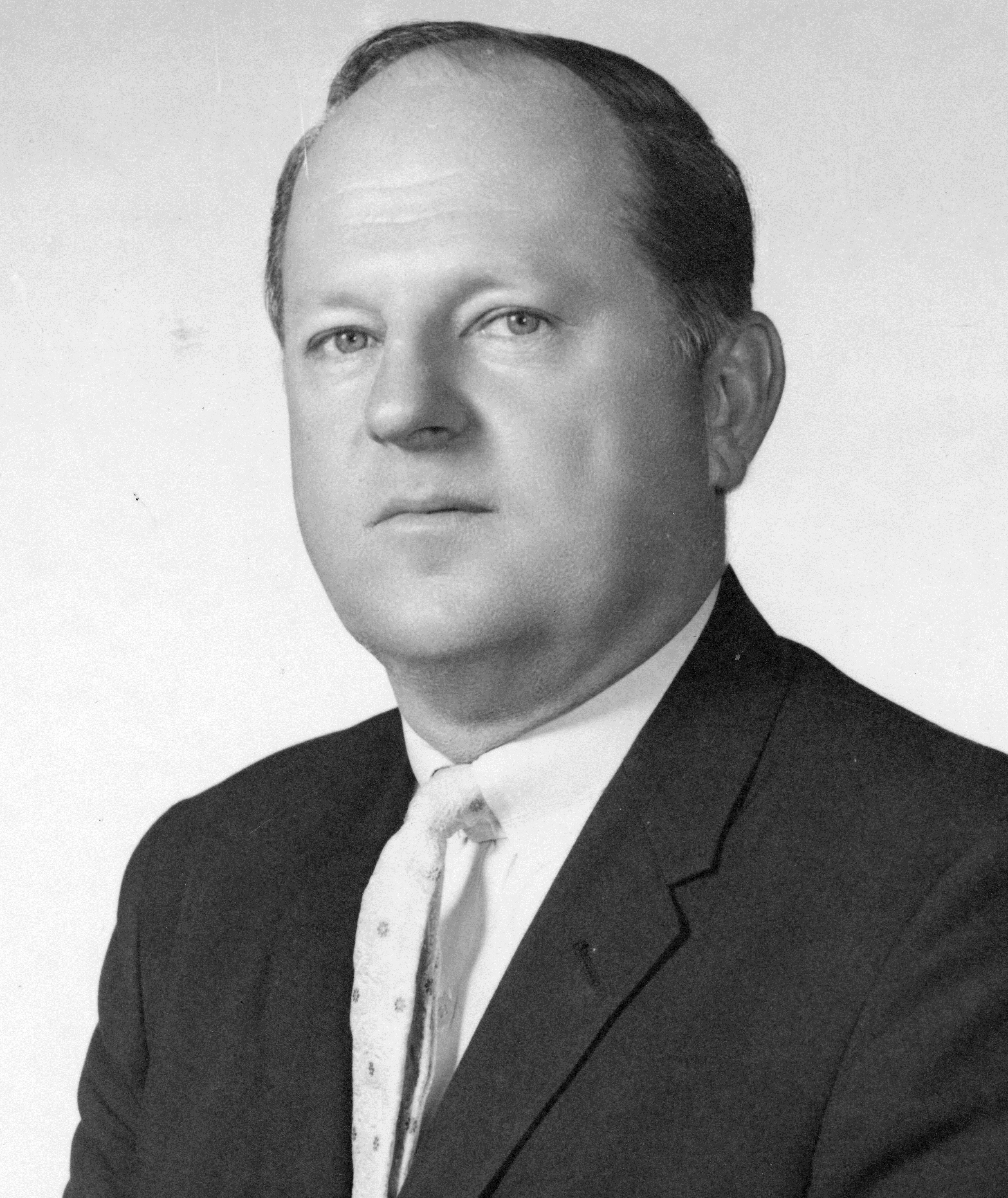
Nominee	James B. Edwards	W.J. Bryan Dorn
Party	Republican	Democratic
Popular vote	266,338	248,861
Percentage	50.3%	47.0%
- County results Edwards: 50–60% 60–70% Dorn: 50–60% 60–70% 70–80% 80–90%
Governor before election
John Carl West
Democratic
Elected Governor
James B. Edwards
Republican

The 1974 South Carolina gubernatorial election was held on November 5, 1974 to select the governor of the state of South Carolina. Initially considered a longshot candidate, Republican James B. Edwards defeated Democrat W. J. Bryan Dorn with a narrow majority of the vote.

== South Dakota ==
1974 South Dakota gubernatorial election
- November 5, 1974
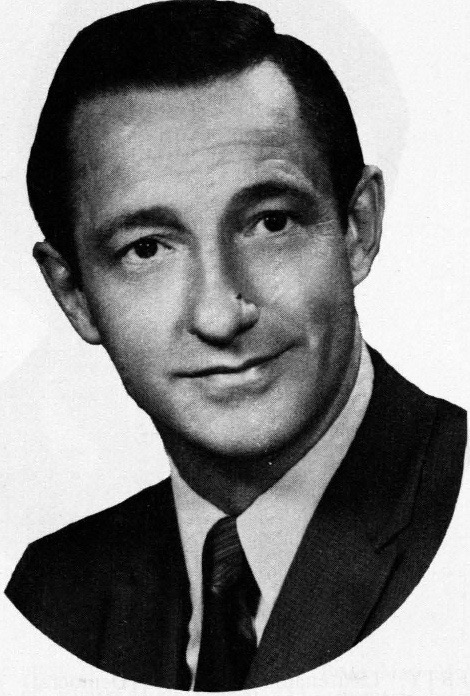

Nominee	Richard F. Kneip	John E. Olson
Party	Democratic	Republican
Running mate	Harvey L. Wollman	Charles Clay
Popular vote	149,151	129,077
Percentage	53.6%	46.4%
- County results Kneip: 50–60% 60–70% Olson: 50–60% 60–70% 70–80%
Governor before election
Richard F. Kneip
Democratic
Governor
Richard F. Kneip
Democratic

The 1974 South Dakota gubernatorial election was held on November 5, 1974, to elect a Governor of South Dakota. This election was the first in South Dakota to elect the governor for a four-year term, after it was allowed by a constitutional amendment passed in 1972. Democratic nominee and Governor Richard F. Kneip was re-elected, defeating Republican nominee John E. Olson. As of 2024, this is the last time that a Democrat was elected Governor of South Dakota, marking the start of the longest Republican winning streak in the country for a state's governorship, as well as the longest gubernatorial winning streak by a single party.

== Tennessee ==
1974 Tennessee gubernatorial election
- November 5, 1974
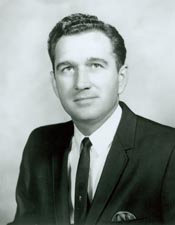

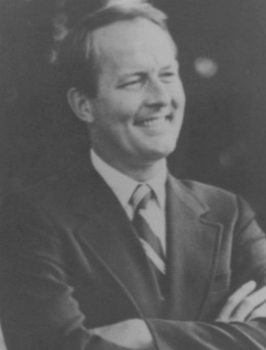
Nominee	Ray Blanton	Lamar Alexander
Party	Democratic	Republican
Popular vote	576,833	455,467
Percentage	55.43%	43.77%
- County results Blanton: 50–60% 60–70% 70–80% 80–90% Alexander: 40–50% 50–60% 60–70%
Governor before election
Winfield Dunn
Republican
Elected Governor
Ray Blanton
Democratic

The 1974 Tennessee gubernatorial election was held on November 5, 1974, to elect the next governor of Tennessee. Incumbent Republican governor Winfield Dunn was ineligible to run for re-election, as the Constitution of Tennessee prohibited governors from serving consecutive terms at the time. Democratic nominee Ray Blanton defeated Republican opponent Lamar Alexander with 55.4% of the vote.

== Texas ==
1974 Texas gubernatorial election
- November 5, 1974
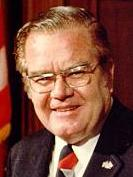

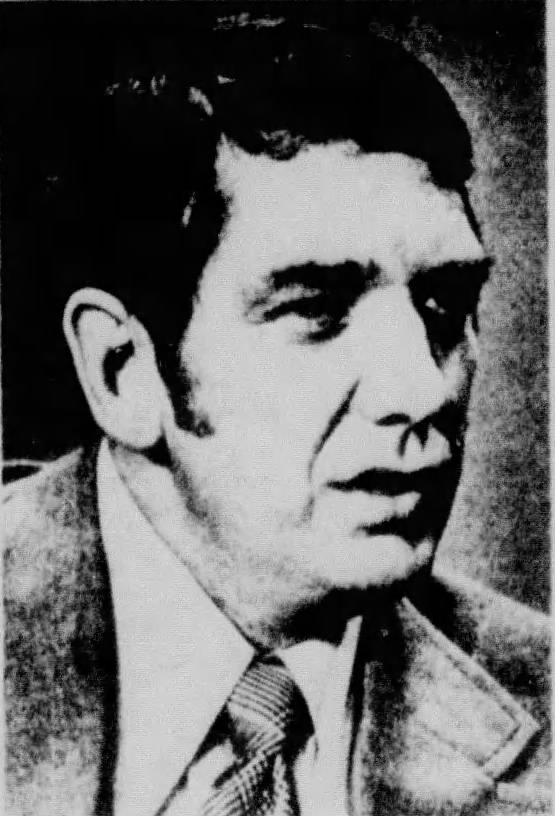

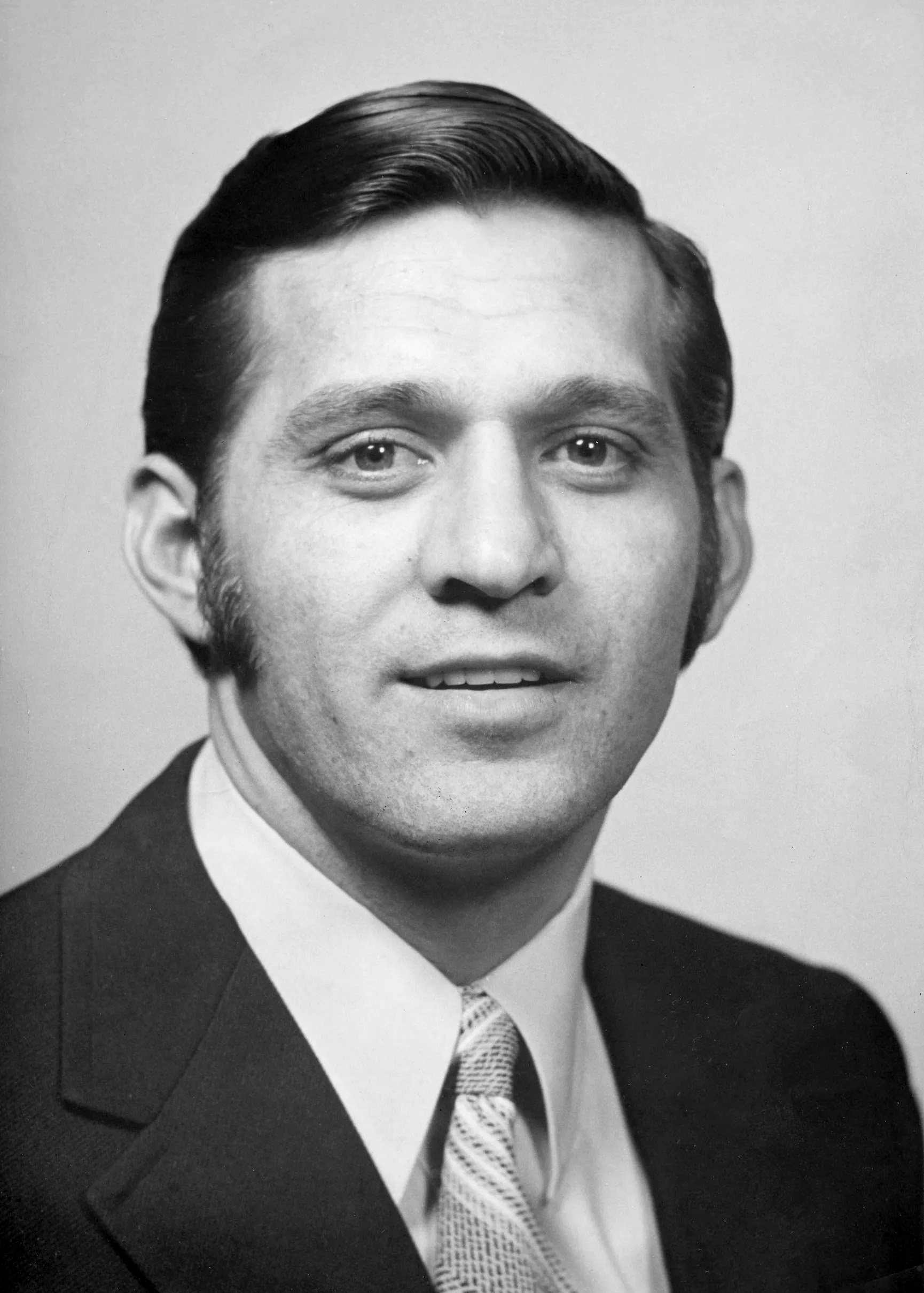
Nominee	Dolph Briscoe	Jim Granberry	Ramsey Muñiz
Party	Democratic	Republican	Raza Unida
Popular vote	1,016,334	514,725	93,295
Percentage	61.4%	31.1%	5.6%
- County results Briscoe: 40–50% 50–60% 60–70% 70–80% 80–90% >90% Granberry: 50–60% Muñiz: 50–60%
Governor before election
Dolph Briscoe
Democratic
Elected Governor
Dolph Briscoe
Democratic

The 1974 Texas gubernatorial election was held on November 5, 1974, to elect the governor of Texas. Incumbent Democratic governor Dolph Briscoe was easily re-elected to a second term, winning 61% of the vote to the 31% of Republican Jim Granberry, the former mayor of Lubbock. Raza Unida candidate Ramsey Muniz won 6%, while the remaining 2% were cast for other candidates.

== Vermont ==
1974 Vermont gubernatorial election
- November 5, 1974
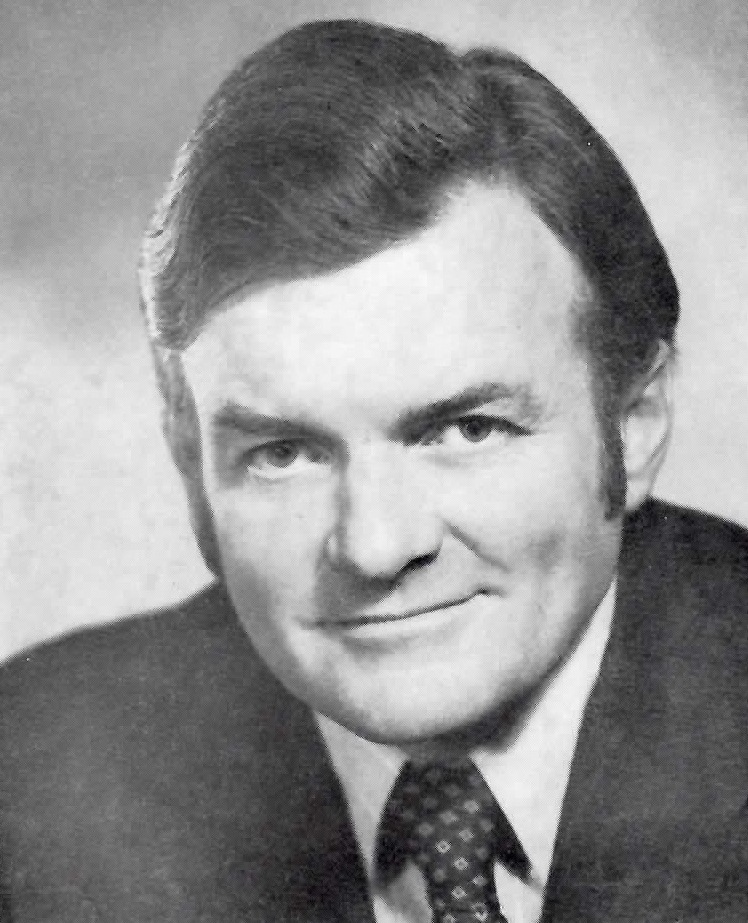

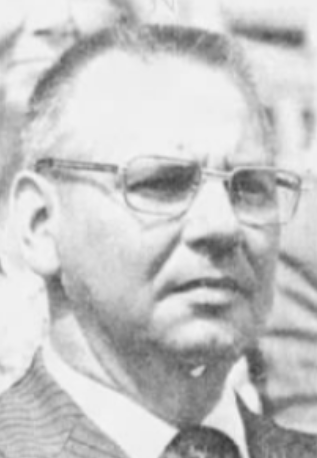

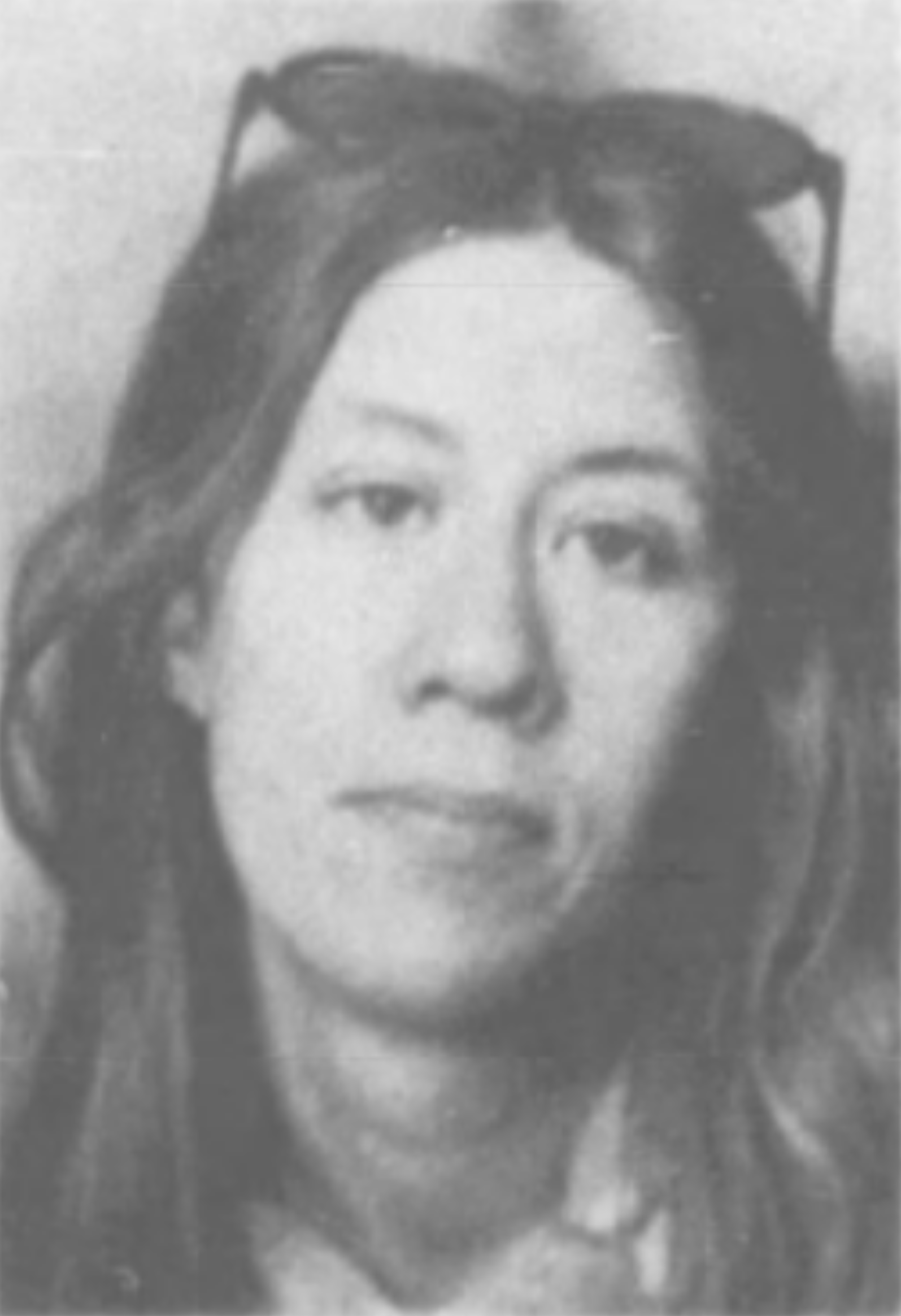
Nominee	Thomas P. Salmon	Walter L. Kennedy	Martha Abbott
Party	Democratic	Republican	Liberty Union
Popular vote	79,842	53,672	7,629
Percentage	56.5%	38.1%	5.4%
- Salmon: 40-50% 50-60% 60-70% 70-80% 80-90% Kennedy: 40-50% 50-60% 60-70% 70-80% >90%
Governor before election
Thomas P. Salmon
Democratic
Elected Governor
Thomas P. Salmon
Democratic

The 1974 Vermont gubernatorial election took place on November 5, 1974. Incumbent Democrat Thomas P. Salmon ran successfully for a second term as Governor of Vermont, defeating Republican candidate Walter L. Kennedy and Liberty Union candidate Martha Abbott.

== Wisconsin ==
1974 Wisconsin gubernatorial election
- November 5, 1974
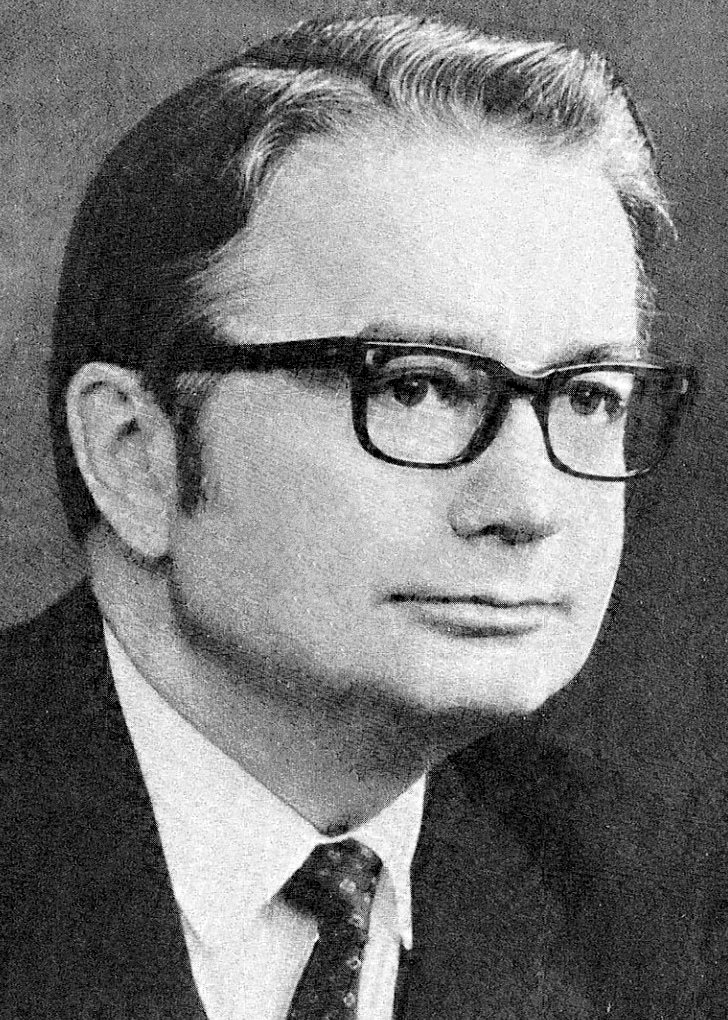

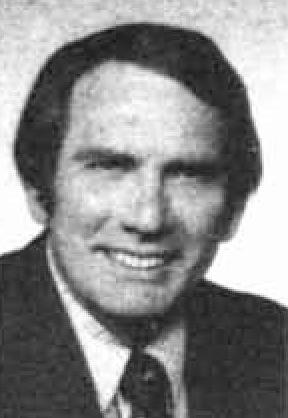
Nominee	Patrick J. Lucey	William Dyke
Party	Democratic	Republican
Running mate	Martin J. Schreiber	John M. Alberts
Popular vote	628,639	497,195
Percentage	53.19%	42.06%
- County results Lucey: 40–50% 50–60% 60–70% 70–80% 80–90% Dyke: 40–50% 50–60% 60–70%
Governor before election
Patrick J. Lucey
Democratic
Elected Governor
Patrick J. Lucey
Democratic

The 1974 Wisconsin gubernatorial election was held on November 5, 1974. Democrat Patrick Lucey won the election with 53% of the vote, winning his second term as Governor of Wisconsin and defeating Republican William Dyke.

== Wyoming ==
1974 Wyoming gubernatorial election
- November 5, 1974
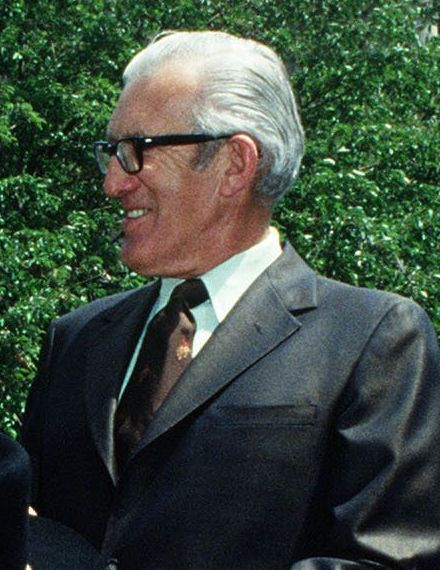

Nominee	Edgar Herschler	Dick Jones
Party	Democratic	Republican
Popular vote	71,741	56,645
Percentage	55.88%	44.12%
- County results Herschler: 50–60% 60–70% 70–80% Jones: 50–60% 60–70%
Governor before election
Stanley Hathaway
Republican
Elected Governor
Edgar Herschler
Democratic

The 1974 Wyoming gubernatorial election took place on November 5, 1974. Incumbent Republican Stanley Hathaway chose to retire than run for a third term as Governor of Wyoming. Former Democratic State Representative Edgar Herschler defeated former Republican State Senator Dick Jones.

== Territories and federal district ==
=== District of Columbia ===
1974 United States gubernatorial elections
- November 5, 1974
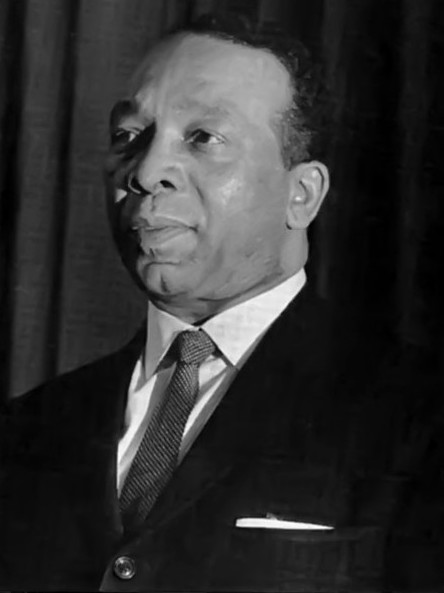

Nominee	Walter Washington	Sam Harris	Jackson R. Champion
Party	Democratic	Independent	Republican
Popular vote	84,676	7,514	3,703
Percentage	80.5%	7.1%	3.5%
Results by ward
Washington
70-80%
80-90%
Mayor before election
Walter Washington
(as Mayor-Commissioner)
Democratic
Elected mayor
Walter Washington
Democratic

Washington, D.C., held its first direct election for its mayor on November 5, 1974. It followed the passage of the District of Columbia Home Rule Act by the U.S. Congress in 1973. The election was won by Walter Washington, a Democrat. Washington won the Democratic nomination in a seven-candidate primary election in which his most significant opponent was Clifford Alexander Jr..

=== Guam ===
Guam election
Party	Candidate	Votes	%
Democratic	Ricardo Bordallo	{{{votes}}}	51.4%
Republican	Carlos Camacho	{{{votes}}}	48.6%
Total votes		{{{votes}}}	100.00
Democratic gain from Republican			

=== U.S. Virgin Islands ===
U.S. Virgin Islands election
Party	Candidate	Votes	%
Independent Citizens Movement	Cyril King	9,419	52.07%
Democratic	Alexander Farrelly	8,670	47.93%
Total votes		18,089	100.00%
Independent Citizens Movement gain from Republican			

== See also ==
- 1974 United States elections
  - 1974 United States Senate elections
  - 1974 United States House of Representatives elections
