= 1974 Maryland gubernatorial election =

- November 5, 1974
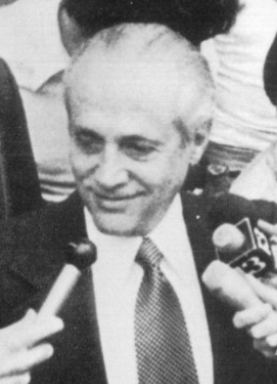

Nominee	Marvin Mandel	Louise Gore
Party	Democratic	Republican
Running mate	Blair Lee III	Frank B. Wade
Popular vote	602,648	346,449
Percentage	63.50%	36.50%
- County results Mandel: 50–60% 60–70% 70–80% Gore: 50–60%
Governor before election
Marvin Mandel
Democratic
Elected Governor
Marvin Mandel
Democratic

The 1974 Maryland gubernatorial election was held on November 5, 1974. Incumbent Democrat Marvin Mandel defeated Republican nominee Louise Gore with 63.50% of the vote.

== Primary elections ==
Primary elections were held on September 10, 1974.

=== Democratic primary ===
==== Candidates ====
- Morgan L. Amaimo
- Wilson K. Barnes, former judge of the Maryland Court of Appeals
- Howard L. Gates
- Marvin Mandel, incumbent governor

==== Results ====
Democratic primary results
Party	Candidate	Votes	%
Democratic	Marvin Mandel (incumbent)	254,509	65.69
Democratic	Wilson K. Barnes	96,902	25.01
Democratic	Morgan L. Amaimo	18,939	4.89
Democratic	Howard L. Gates	17,084	4.41
Total votes		387,434	100.00

=== Republican primary ===
==== Candidates ====
- Louise Gore, former state senator
- Lawrence Hogan, U.S. representative

==== Results ====
Republican primary results
Party	Candidate	Votes	%
Republican	Louise Gore	57,626	53.60
Republican	Lawrence Hogan	49,887	46.40
Total votes		107,513	100.00

== General election ==
=== Candidates ===
- Louise Gore, Republican
- Marvin Mandel, Democratic

=== Results ===
1974 Maryland gubernatorial election
Party	Candidate	Votes	%	±%
Democratic	Marvin Mandel (incumbent)	602,648	63.50%	
Republican	Louise Gore	346,449	36.50%	
Majority		256,199		
Turnout		949,097		
Democratic hold		Swing		
