= Louise Gore =

American politician (1925–2005)

Member of the Maryland Senate from the 3-A district
- In office January 1967 – January 1969 Serving with Thomas Anderson
- Succeeded by: Newton Steers

Member of the Maryland House of Delegates from the Montgomery County district
- In office January 1963 – January 1967

Personal details
- Born: March 6, 1925 Leesburg, Virginia, U.S.
- Died: October 6, 2005 (aged 80) Washington, D.C., U.S.
- Party: Republican
- Education: George Washington University (attended); Marymount Manhattan College (attended); Bennington College (BA); Georgetown University (MA)

Beatrice Louise Gore (March 6, 1925 – October 6, 2005) was an American Republican politician from Maryland. She was the first Republican woman elected to the Maryland Senate in 1966.

Born in Leesburg, Virginia, Gore was a prominent Maryland political heavy weight and daughter of lawyer and real estate investor H. Grady Gore. She served as a member of the Maryland's General Assembly from 1963 to 1969 serving as a State Senator from Potomac in Montgomery County (see the Maryland Manuals for 1963 through 1969). She was a Republican National Committee member from 1972 to 1984 and worked for Dwight D. Eisenhower's presidential campaign in 1952.

In 1974, Gore launched an unsuccessful bid for governor of Maryland against then incumbent Marvin Mandel, who was the successor to Spiro Agnew. She was opposed by Congressman Lawrence Hogan Sr. (R) who represented the congressional district encompassing Prince George County and who had served on the House Judiciary Committee being one of the Republicans who helped draw up and vote for the "Articles of Impeachment" against then-President Richard Nixon. Gore was considered to be the underdog candidate in the Republican primary to Hogan but won in an upset believed due to Hogan's anti-Nixon stance. Gore was considered at the time to be a "liberal Republican" but because she did not take an open public stand against Nixon (though she personally supported Nixon's removal) and many "loyal" Republicans voted for her over Hogan. Gore became the first woman of either major political party in Maryland to be nominated for governor. Gore's gubernatorial campaign included a lion and a placard which read: "Gore is no pussycat." Gore fought against Governor Marvin Mandel who was criticized for an extramarital affair which later resulted in a divorce between Mandel and his first wife. He was also suspected of corruption. Gore was subjected to a "whisper campaign" concerning her sexuality which was suspected but never proved as she had never married. Mandel won in a landslide.

Gore was a second cousin of former Vice President Al Gore through their common ancestor Charles Claiborne Gore. Her sister, Mary Gore Dean, was the mistress of Attorney General John Mitchell and a Watergate scandal figure, and Mary's daughter is Deborah Gore Dean, a former official in the United States Department of Housing and Urban Development convicted in a kickback scheme.

== Notes ==
Party political offices
Preceded by Charles Blair	Republican nominee for Governor of Maryland; 1974	Succeeded by John Beall
