= William B. Saxbe =

American politician (1916–2010)

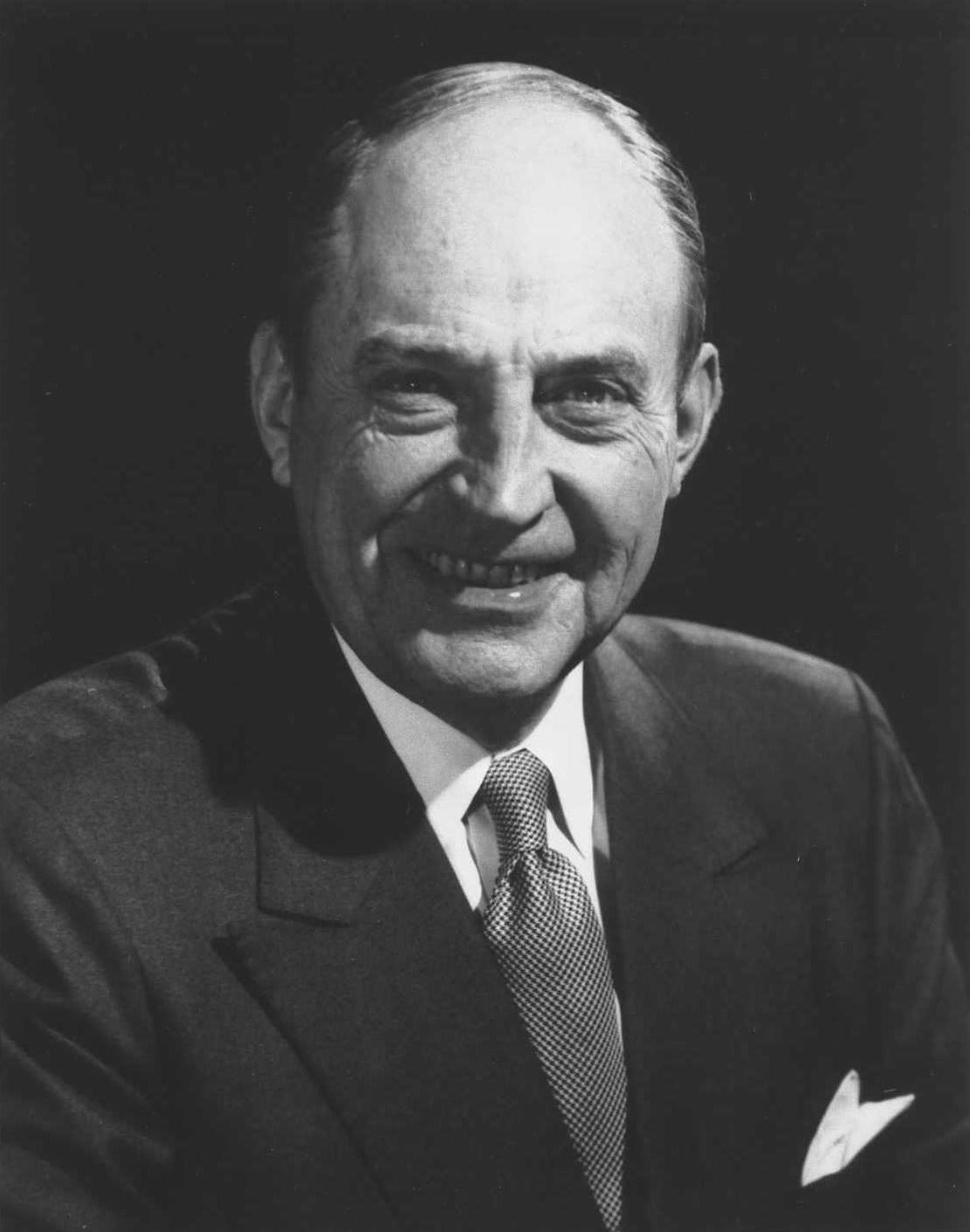

United States Ambassador to India
- In office March 8, 1975 – November 20, 1976
- President: Gerald Ford
- Preceded by: Daniel Patrick Moynihan
- Succeeded by: Robert F. Goheen

70th United States Attorney General
- In office January 4, 1974 – February 2, 1975
- President: Richard Nixon; Gerald Ford
- Deputy: Laurence Silberman
- Preceded by: Elliot Richardson
- Succeeded by: Edward H. Levi

United States Senator from Ohio
- In office January 3, 1969 – January 3, 1974
- Preceded by: Frank Lausche
- Succeeded by: Howard Metzenbaum

Attorney General of Ohio
- In office January 14, 1963 – January 3, 1969
- Governor: Jim Rhodes
- Preceded by: Mark McElroy
- Succeeded by: Paul W. Brown
- In office January 14, 1957 – January 12, 1959
- Governor: C. William O'Neill
- Preceded by: C. William O'Neill
- Succeeded by: Mark McElroy

Speaker of the Ohio House of Representatives
- In office January 5, 1953 – January 2, 1955
- Preceded by: Gordon Renner
- Succeeded by: Roger Cloud

Member of the Ohio House of Representatives
- In office 1947 – January 2, 1955

Personal details
- Born: William Bart Saxbe; June 24, 1916 Mechanicsburg, Ohio, U.S.
- Died: August 24, 2010 (aged 94) Mechanicsburg, Ohio, U.S.
- Party: Republican
- Spouse: Dolly Kleinhans (m. 1940)
- Children: 3, including Rocky
- Education: Ohio State University (BA, LLB)

Military service
- Allegiance: United States
- Branch/service: United States Army
- Years of service: 1940-1945; 1951-1952
- Rank: Colonel
- Unit: United States Army Air Corps
- Battles/wars: World War II; Korean War

William Bart Saxbe (/ˈsæksbiː/ SAKS-bee; June 24, 1916 – August 24, 2010) was an American lawyer and politician. A member of the Republican Party, he served as a U.S. senator for Ohio from 1969 to 1974 after a career in state politics that included terms as Ohio Attorney General and as a legislator. Saxbe then served as the 70th United States attorney general from 1974 to 1975 under Presidents Richard Nixon and Gerald Ford, and as the U.S. ambassador to India from 1975 to 1976.

== Early life and career ==
Saxbe was born 1916 in Mechanicsburg, Ohio, the son of Faye Henry "Maggie" (née Carey) Saxbe, and Bart Rockwell Saxbe. He received a Bachelor of Arts degree from the Ohio State University in 1940, where he was a member of Chi Phi fraternity. He then served in the United States Army Air Forces during World War II, from 1940 to 1945.

When Saxbe returned from World War II, he entered the Ohio State University College of Law and received a Bachelor of Laws degree in 1948. He remained in the Ohio National Guard and was on active duty during the Korean War, from 1951 to 1952. He was discharged from the reserve with the rank of colonel during 1963.

== Political career ==
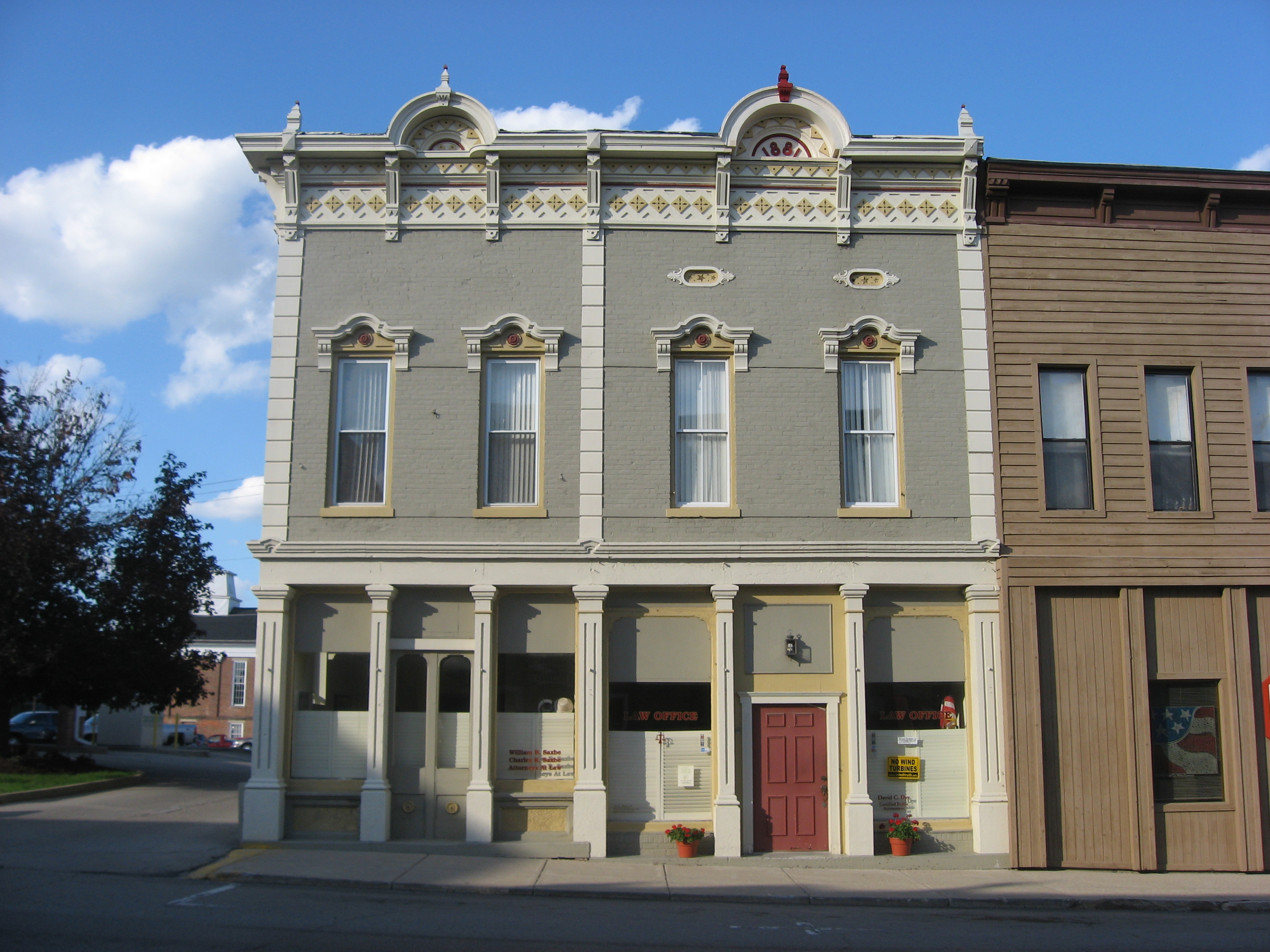
Saxbe's law offices in Mechanicsburg, Ohio

While still in law school, Saxbe campaigned for the Ohio House of Representatives in 1947, and won. He served as the Ohio House majority leader during 1951 and 1952, and as speaker of the House during 1953 and 1954. During 1957, Saxbe was elected Ohio Attorney General, defeating Democrat Stephen M. Young. He was re-elected three times and had that office until 1968. In this capacity, Saxbe argued the murder case of Doctor Sam Sheppard before the United States Supreme Court during 1966, against Sheppard's attorney F. Lee Bailey. He was a member of the Ohio Crime Commission from 1967 to 1968.

Saxbe won the 1968 United States Senate election in Ohio, defeating Democratic candidate and former U.S. representative John J. Gilligan. During his campaign, he became a prominent supporter of a national health insurance system, co-sponsoring the Kennedy–Griffiths universal healthcare program in 1971 alongside fellow Republicans Jacob Javits (New York), Clifford Case (New Jersey) and John Sherman Cooper (Kentucky). When President Richard Nixon had resumed bombing North Vietnam in late 1972, Saxbe stated that Nixon "lost his senses".

Saxbe served in the Senate until January 3, 1974, when Nixon appointed him U.S. Attorney General. He was the permanent replacement for Elliot Richardson, who had resigned during the "Saturday Night Massacre" resignations during the Watergate scandal. Saxbe took over from Solicitor General Robert Bork, who had served as acting attorney general after Richardson's resignation. Gilligan, who had been elected Governor of Ohio in 1970, appointed Democrat Howard Metzenbaum to serve the remainder of Saxbe's vacated term. Former astronaut John Glenn was elected to replace Saxbe in November 1974.

There was some minor controversy regarding Saxbe's appointment and the Ineligibility Clause of the Constitution, which states that a legislator cannot be appointed to an executive position during the same term that the legislature had voted to increase the salary of said position. Nixon addressed the problem by having Congress reduce the salary of the attorney general to $35,000, as it was before Saxbe's term in the Senate began. This maneuver had only occurred once before, when Senator Philander C. Knox had been appointed Secretary of State during 1909, and has since become known as the "Saxbe fix". Because there was not any perception that anything intentional had been done to benefit Saxbe, the matter was largely ignored.

As attorney general for Nixon, Saxbe supervised United States v. AT&T, the antitrust suit that ultimately ended the Bell System telephone monopoly. Saxbe continued to serve as attorney general for the first few months of Gerald Ford's presidency before resigning in early 1975, when he was appointed United States Ambassador to India. He served in that capacity until 1977. After that, Saxbe returned to Mechanicsburg and resumed the practice of law.

== Personal life and death ==
In 1940, Saxbe married the former Ardath Louise "Dolly" Kleinhans. They had three children: William Bart Saxbe Jr., Juliet Louise "Juli" Saxbe Spitzer, and Charles Rockwell "Rocky" Saxbe. Charles Saxbe served four terms in Ohio House of Representatives, and later as an attorney in private practice.

Saxbe was known for his quips. Asked about Senator Bob Dole, he commented that Dole was so unpopular with his fellow senators at the time that he "couldn't sell beer on a troop ship".

He died in his hometown of Mechanicsburg, Ohio, at the age of 94 on August 24, 2010. At the time of his death, Saxbe was the oldest living Republican senator and the second-oldest living senator overall (after Harry F. Byrd Jr. of Virginia).

Political offices
Preceded by Gordon Renner	Speaker of the Ohio House of Representatives; 1953–1955	Succeeded by Roger Cloud
Legal offices
Preceded by C. William O'Neill	Attorney General of Ohio; 1957–1959	Succeeded by Mark McElroy
Preceded by Mark McElroy	Attorney General of Ohio; 1963–1969	Succeeded by Paul W. Brown
Preceded by Elliot Richardson	United States Attorney General; 1974–1975	Succeeded by Edward H. Levi
Party political offices
Preceded by C. William O'Neill	Republican nominee for Attorney General of Ohio; 1956, 1958, 1962, 1966	Succeeded by John D. Herbert
Preceded by John M. Briley	Republican nominee for U.S. Senator from Ohio (Class 3); 1968	Succeeded by Ralph Perk
U.S. Senate
Preceded by Frank Lausche	U.S. Senator (Class 3) from Ohio; 1969–1974; Served alongside: Stephen M. Young, Robert Taft Jr.	Succeeded by Howard Metzenbaum
Diplomatic posts
Preceded by Pat Moynihan	United States Ambassador to India; 1975–1976	Succeeded by Robert F. Goheen
