= 1986 Ohio gubernatorial election =

- November 4, 1986
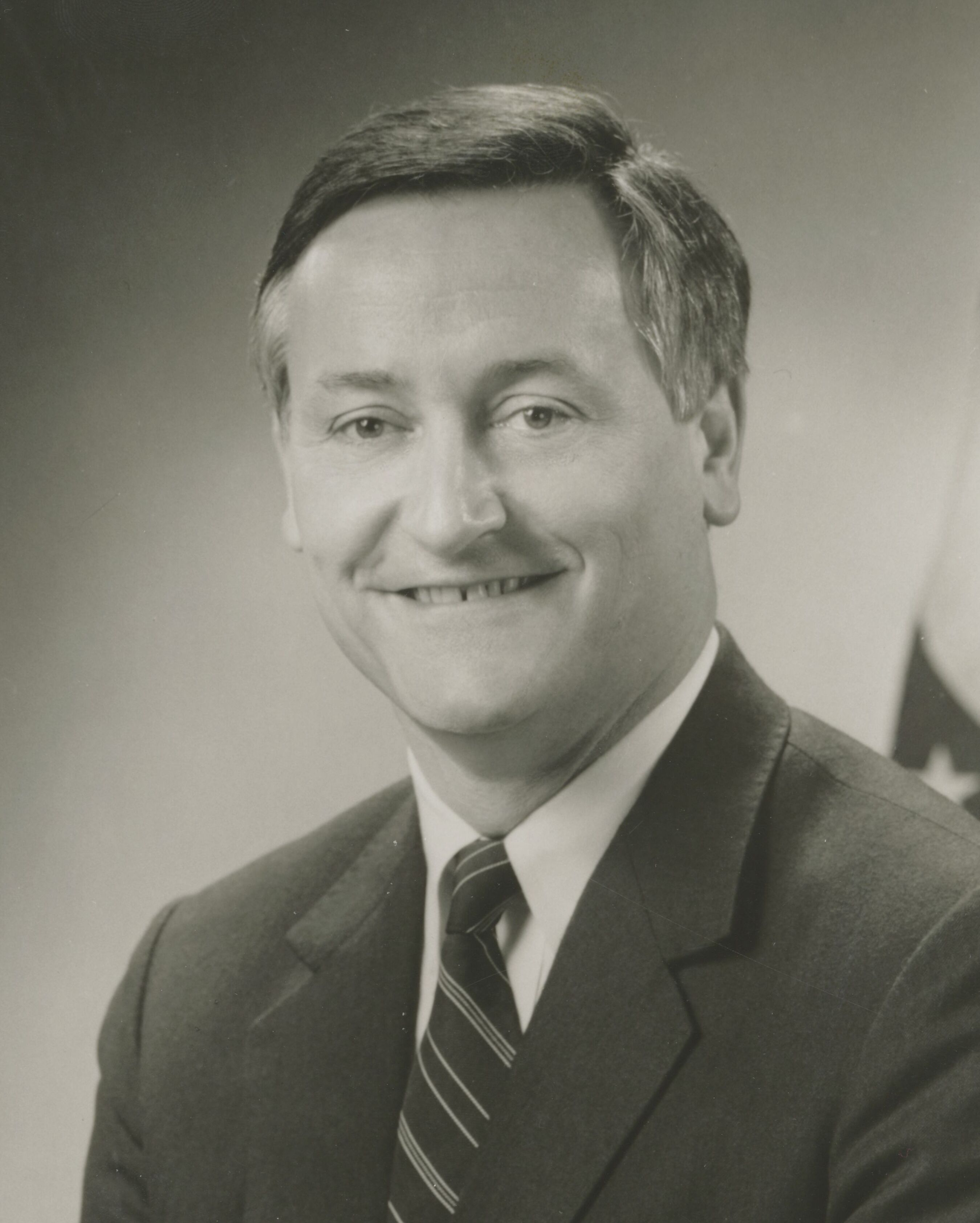

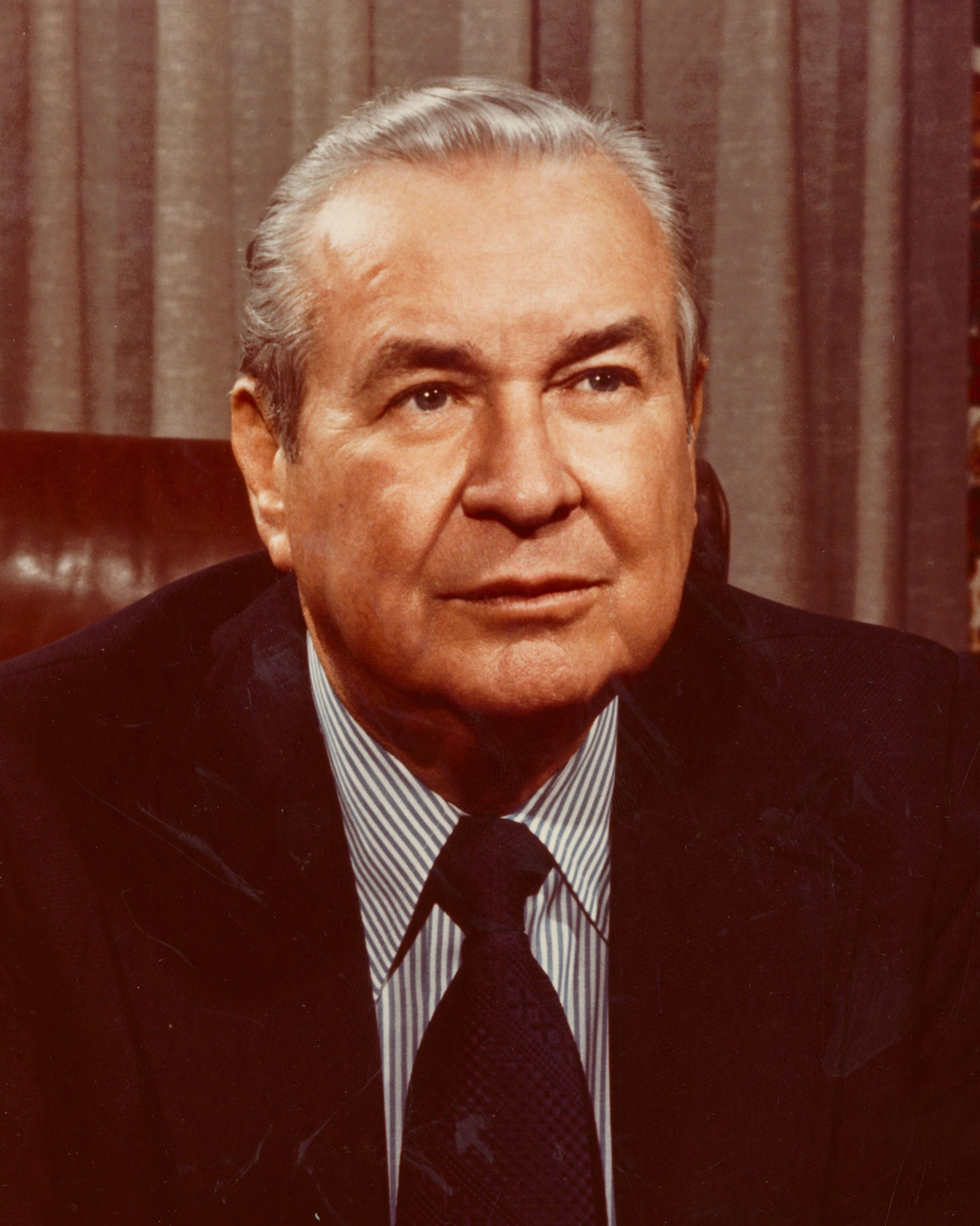
Nominee	Dick Celeste	Jim Rhodes
Party	Democratic	Republican
Running mate	Paul Leonard	Bob Taft
Popular vote	1,858,372	1,207,264
Percentage	60.60%	39.37%
- Celeste: 50–60% 60–70% 70–80% 80–90% >90% Rhodes: 50–60% 60–70% 70–80% 80–90%
Governor before election
Dick Celeste
Democratic
Elected Governor
Dick Celeste
Democratic

The 1986 Ohio gubernatorial election was held on November 4, 1986. Incumbent Democratic Governor Dick Celeste ran against four-time former Governor Jim Rhodes, who had previously defeated the last two incumbent Democratic governors in 1962 and 1974. The two had faced off before in 1978, with Rhodes winning by 47,536 votes for his fourth victory. Eight years later, at the age of 77, Rhodes was attempting to win a record fifth term. However, Celeste won by an even bigger margin than he did four years earlier, becoming the first Democrat to win consecutive elections for governor since Frank Lausche, who won four consecutive times in 1948, 1950, 1952, and 1954. As of 2022, this is the last time a Democrat was re-elected governor of Ohio and the only time a Democrat won a second four-year term. This was the last time a Democrat would elected governor of Ohio until 2006.

== Democratic primary ==
=== Candidates ===
- Dick Celeste, governor of Ohio

=== Results ===
Democratic primary results
Party	Candidate	Votes	%
Democratic	Dick Celeste (incumbent)	684,206	99.87
Democratic	Write-ins	880	0.13
Total votes		685,086	100.0

== Republican primary ==
=== Candidates ===
- Paul E. Gillmor, Ohio Senate majority leader
- Paul E. Pfeifer, Ohio State senator
- Jim Rhodes, former governor of Ohio

=== Results ===
Republican primary results
Party	Candidate	Votes	%
Republican	Jim Rhodes	352,261	48.19
Republican	Paul E. Gillmor	281,737	38.54
Republican	Paul E. Pfeifer	96,948	13.26
Total votes		730,946	100.00

== General election ==
=== Results ===
Ohio gubernatorial election, 1986
Party	Candidate	Votes	%	±%
Democratic	Dick Celeste (incumbent)	1,858,372	60.60	+1.56
Republican	Jim Rhodes	1,207,264	39.37	+0.52
Write-ins		975	0.03	N/A
Majority		651,108	21.23	
Turnout		3,066,611		
Democratic hold		Swing		
