= 1968 United States Senate election in Ohio =

- November 5, 1968
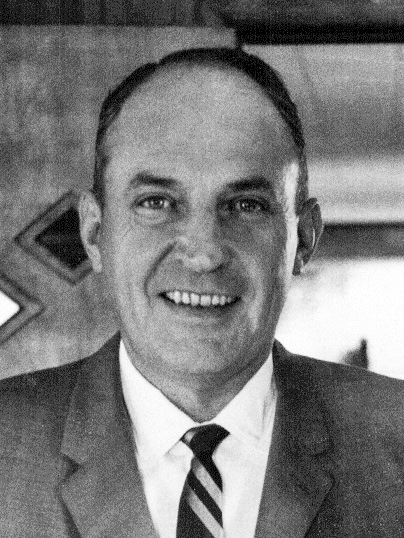

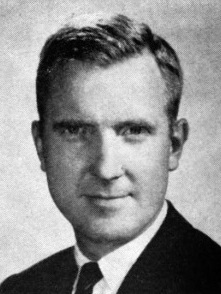
Nominee	William B. Saxbe	John J. Gilligan
Party	Republican	Democratic
Popular vote	1,928,964	1,814,152
Percentage	51.53%	48.47%
- County results Saxbe: 50–60% 60–70% 70–80% Gilligan: 50–60% 60–70%
U.S. senator before election
Frank J. Lausche
Democratic
Elected U.S. Senator
William Saxbe
Republican

The 1968 United States Senate election in Ohio took place on November 5, 1968. Incumbent Senator Frank Lausche, considered one of the most conservative Northern Democrats in the Senate, ran for re-election to a third term, but lost the Democratic primary to former U.S. Representative John J. Gilligan. In the general election, Gilligan narrowly lost to Republican state attorney general William B. Saxbe.

In January 1974, Saxbe was appointed United States Attorney General and resigned from the Senate; Gilligan, who had been elected Governor of Ohio in 1970, appointed Democrat Howard Metzenbaum to replace him.

== Democratic primary ==
=== Candidates ===
- John J. Gilligan, former U.S. Representative from Ohio's 1st congressional district (1965–67)
- Frank Lausche, incumbent Senator since 1957

Democratic primary results
Party	Candidate	Votes	%
Democratic	John J. Gilligan	544,814	55.40%
Democratic	Frank Lausche (incumbent)	438,588	44.60%
Total votes		983,402	100.00%

== Republican primary ==
=== Candidates ===
- Albert Edward Payne
- William B. Saxbe, Ohio Attorney General
- William L. White, perennial candidate from Newark

Republican primary results
Party	Candidate	Votes	%
Republican	William B. Saxbe	575,178	82.31%
Republican	William L. White	71,191	10.91%
Republican	Albert Edward Payne	52,393	7.50%
Total votes		698,762	100.00%

== Results ==
1968 United States Senate election in Ohio
Party	Candidate	Votes	%	±%
Republican	William B. Saxbe	1,928,964	51.53%	▲13.09
Democratic	John J. Gilligan	1,814,152	48.47%	▼13.09
Independent	Richard Wingerter (write-in)	2	0.00%	N/A
Independent	Eugene P. Okey (write-in)	1	0.00%	N/A
Socialist Labor	Peter M. Kapitz (write-in)	1	0.00%	N/A
Total votes		3,743,120	100.0%	

== See also ==
- 1968 United States Senate elections
