= Schinnerer =

Schinnerer is a surname. Notable people with the surname include:

- Adolf Schinnerer (1876–1949), German artist
- Mark C. Schinnerer (1899–1978), American politician
