= 1966 Ohio gubernatorial election =

- November 8, 1966
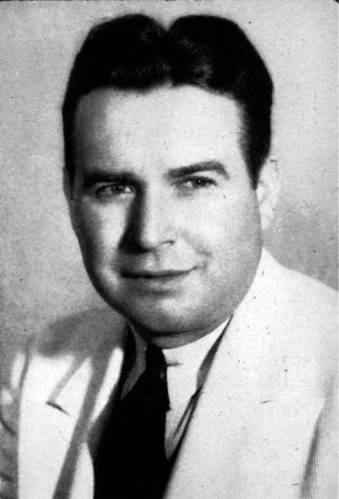

Nominee	Jim Rhodes	Frazier Reams Jr.
Party	Republican	Democratic
Popular vote	1,795,277	1,092,054
Percentage	62.18%	37.82%
- County results Rhodes: 50–60% 60–70% 70–80% Reams: 50–60%
Governor before election
Jim Rhodes
Republican
Elected Governor
Jim Rhodes
Republican

The 1966 Ohio gubernatorial election was held on November 8, 1966. Incumbent Republican Jim Rhodes defeated Democratic nominee Frazier Reams Jr. with 62.18% of the vote. This election was the first time since 1940 that an incumbent Republican governor was re-elected, and the first time since 1954 that any incumbent governor was re-elected.

== Primary elections ==
Primary elections were held on May 3, 1966.

=== Democratic primary ===
==== Candidates ====
- Frazier Reams Jr., state senator
- Harry H. McIlwain, attorney

==== Results ====
Democratic primary results
Party	Candidate	Votes	%
Democratic	Frazier Reams Jr.	326,419	58.52
Democratic	Harry H. McIlwain	231,406	41.48
Total votes		557,825	100.00

=== Republican primary ===
==== Candidates ====
- Jim Rhodes, incumbent governor
- William L. White

==== Results ====
Republican primary results
Party	Candidate	Votes	%
Republican	Jim Rhodes (incumbent)	577,827	88.73
Republican	William L. White	73,428	11.28
Total votes		651,255	100.00

== General election ==
=== Candidates ===
- Jim Rhodes, Republican
- Frazier Reams Jr., Democratic

=== Results ===
1966 Ohio gubernatorial election
Party	Candidate	Votes	%	±%
Republican	Jim Rhodes (incumbent)	1,795,277	62.18%	
Democratic	Frazier Reams Jr.	1,092,054	37.82%	
Majority		703,223		
Turnout		2,887,331		
Republican hold		Swing		
