= John J. Gilligan =

American politician, governor of Ohio (1921–2013)

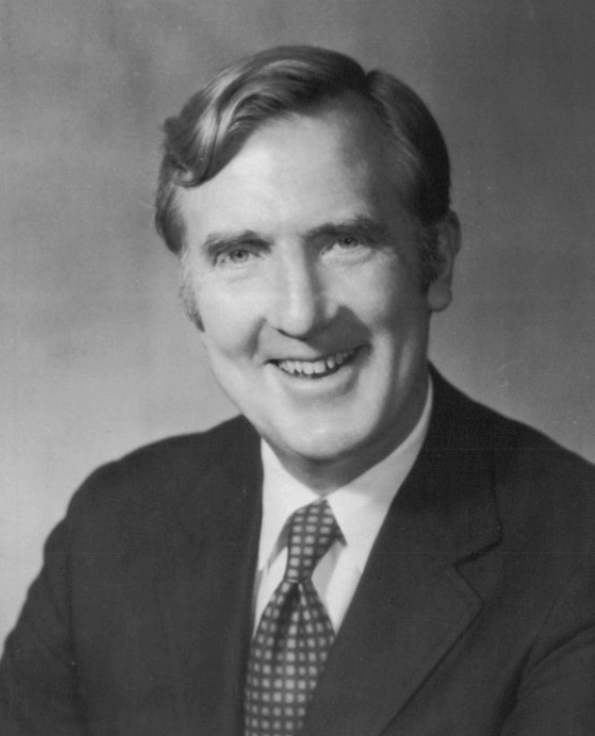

6th Administrator of the United States Agency for International Development
- In office March 30, 1977 – March 31, 1979
- President: Jimmy Carter
- Preceded by: Daniel Parker
- Succeeded by: Douglas Bennet

62nd Governor of Ohio
- In office January 11, 1971 – January 13, 1975
- Lieutenant: John Brown
- Preceded by: Jim Rhodes
- Succeeded by: Jim Rhodes

Member of the U.S. House of Representatives from Ohio's 1st district
- In office January 3, 1965 – January 3, 1967
- Preceded by: Carl Rich
- Succeeded by: Robert Taft Jr.

Personal details
- Born: John Joyce Gilligan; March 22, 1921 Cincinnati, Ohio, U.S.
- Died: August 26, 2013 (aged 92) Cincinnati, Ohio, U.S.
- Party: Democratic
- Spouses: Mary Dixon (m. 1945; died 1996); Susan Fremont (m. 2000)
- Children: 4, including Kathleen
- Relatives: K. Gary Sebelius (son-in-law)
- Education: University of Notre Dame (BA); University of Cincinnati (LLB)

Military service
- Allegiance: United States
- Branch/service: United States Navy
- Years of service: 1942–1945
- Rank: Lieutenant
- Battles/wars: World War II

John Joyce "Jack" Gilligan (March 22, 1921 – August 26, 2013) was an American politician who served as the 62nd governor of Ohio from 1971 to 1975. A member of the Democratic Party, he previously represented Ohio's 1st congressional district in the U.S. House of Representatives from 1965 to 1967 and later served as the 6th administrator of the United States Agency for International Development. Gilligan was a World War II veteran and the father of Kathleen Sebelius, who served as governor of Kansas and United States Secretary of Health and Human Services.

== Early life ==
Gilligan was born in Cincinnati, Ohio, the son of Harry Gilligan, a funeral home operator, and his wife, Blanche. His twin sister was Jeanne Joyce Gilligan. His family was Irish Catholic. He graduated from St. Xavier High School in 1939, the University of Notre Dame in 1943 and the University of Cincinnati College of Law in 1947. In between his degrees, he served in the United States Navy during World War II in the Atlantic, Pacific and Mediterranean as a destroyer gunnery officer.

== Career ==
After the war, Gilligan returned to Cincinnati to teach literature at Xavier University from 1948 to 1953. He also served as member of the Cincinnati City Council from 1953 to 1963, and was a candidate for Ohio Congressman-at-Large in 1962.

In 1964, he was elected to the 89th United States Congress as a representative for Ohio's 1st congressional district, serving from January 3, 1965, to January 3, 1967. Gilligan narrowly lost his re-election bid in 1966 to Republican Robert Taft Jr. after the Republican-controlled Ohio General Assembly redrew his district to favor the Republican Party. In 1968, Gilligan defeated sitting U.S. Senator Frank Lausche in the Democratic primary, but narrowly lost in the general election to Republican William B. Saxbe after Lausche declined to support him in the general election.

Gilligan won election for governor of Ohio in 1970, defeating Republican state auditor Roger Cloud by 342,903 votes, and serving from 1971 to 1975. His signature achievement in office was the creation of Ohio's state income tax. Gilligan was seen as a favorite to win a second term in the 1974 Ohio gubernatorial election, a year that strongly favored Democrats following the Watergate scandal, but narrowly lost re-election in an upset to former Republican governor Jim Rhodes (who had been barred from running in 1970 due to term limits) by only 11,488 votes. The backlash of big business against Gilligan and in favor of Rhodes was seen by many as the reason for his defeat.

Gilligan subsequently served as the administrator of the United States Agency for International Development (USAID) from 1977 to 1979. In 1980, he was elected to the Common Cause National Governing Board. He served as director of the Institute for Public Policy from 1979 to 1986, and taught at the University of Notre Dame from 1986 to 1992. He also served as director of the civic issues forum at the University of Cincinnati College of Law. In 1999, Gilligan was elected to the Board of Education of the Cincinnati Public Schools. He chose not to stand for re-election when his term expired in 2007.

== Personal life and death ==
Gilligan is the father of four children, including Kathleen Sebelius, who served as Governor of Kansas and United States Secretary of Health and Human Services. They became the first father-daughter governor duo in the United States after her election.

On October 17, 1973, Gilligan, while governor, claimed to have seen a UFO while driving near Ann Arbor, Michigan. During a press conference he stated: "I saw one (UFO) the other night, so help me. I'm absolutely serious. I saw this."

Gilligan died at home in Cincinnati on August 26, 2013, at the age of 92. His son said he died of congestive heart failure.

== See also ==
- List of United States representatives from Ohio
- List of governors of Ohio

U.S. House of Representatives
| Preceded by Carl Rich | Member of the U.S. House of Representatives from Ohio's 1st congressional district 1965–1967 | Succeeded by Robert Taft |
Party political offices
| Preceded by Frank Lausche | Democratic nominee for Senator from Ohio (Class 3); 1968 | Succeeded by John Glenn |
| Preceded by Frazier Reams | Democratic nominee for Governor of Ohio; 1970, 1974 | Succeeded by Dick Celeste |
Political offices
| Preceded by Jim Rhodes | Governor of Ohio; 1971–1975 | Succeeded by Jim Rhodes |
| Preceded by Daniel Parker | Administrator of the United States Agency for International Development; 1977–1979 | Succeeded by Douglas Bennet |
