= 1966 Ohio State Auditor election =

- November 8, 1966

Nominee	Roger Cloud	Thomas E. Ferguson
Party	Republican	Democratic
Popular vote	1,527,673	1,196,780
Percentage	56.07%	43.93%
- County results Cloud: 50–60% 60–70% 70–80% Ferguson: 50–60%
State Auditor before election
Archer E. Reilly
Republican
Elected State Auditor
Roger Cloud
Republican

The 1966 Ohio State Auditor election was held on November 8, 1966, to elect the Ohio State Auditor. Primaries were held on May 3, 1966. Republican former Ohio State Auditor Roger Cloud won the election by a wide margin of 12 percentage points over Democrat Thomas E. Ferguson.

== Republican primary ==
=== Candidates ===
- Roger Cloud, former Ohio State Auditor (1965–1966)

=== Campaign ===
Cloud won the Republican nomination unopposed.

=== Results ===
Republican primary results
Party	Candidate	Votes	%
Republican	Roger Cloud	542,886	100.00%
Total votes		542,886	100.00%

== Democratic primary ==
=== Candidates ===
- Thomas E. Ferguson
- Charles Pugliese

=== Campaign ===
Ferguson easily won the nomination over Pugliese, winning over 80% of the vote.

=== Results ===
Democratic primary results
Party	Candidate	Votes	%
Democratic	Thomas E. Ferguson	421,321	83.35%
Democratic	Charles Pugliese	84,161	16.65%
Total votes		505,482	100.00%

== General election ==
=== Candidates ===
- Roger Cloud, former Ohio State Auditor (1965–1966) (Republican)
- Thomas E. Ferguson (Democratic)

=== Results ===
1966 Ohio State Auditor election results
Party	Candidate	Votes	%	±%
Republican	Roger Cloud	1,527,673	56.07%	+3.5
Democratic	Thomas E. Ferguson	1,196,780	43.93%	−3.5
Total votes		2,724,453	100.00%	
Republican hold				
