= Rhodes State College =

Community college in Lima, Ohio, US

Coordinates: 40.738348°N 84.027676°W

- Other name: Rhodes State
- Former names: Lima Technical College (1971-2001); James A. Rhodes State College (2001-20??)
- Type: Public community college
- Established: 1971; 55 years ago
- Parent institution: University System of Ohio
- Students: 1,845
- Location: Lima, Ohio, United States
- Colors: Blue & White
- Nickname: Barons
- Website: www.rhodesstate.edu/

James A. Rhodes State College is a public community college in Lima, Ohio, United States. High school students comprise over 50% of those enrolled at Rhodes State College.

== History ==
Rhodes State College, previously Lima Technical College, was founded in 1971 in Lima, OH. This institution was based primarily on technical training of students who lived in Allen County, OH. Over five hundred students enrolled during the first year. By the mid-1990s, Lima Technical College offered over seventy Associate and other certificate degree programs.

In 2002, Lima Technical College changed its name to James A. Rhodes State College in order to honor the former governor. Rhodes played a major role in developing Ohio's two-year colleges. It is now referred to as Rhodes State College.
