= Gordon Renner =

American politician (1900–1964)

89th Speaker of the Ohio House of Representatives
- In office January 1, 1951 – 1953
- Preceded by: John F. Cantwell
- Succeeded by: William B. Saxbe

Member of the Ohio House of Representatives from Ohio

Personal details
- Born: November 17, 1900 Cincinnati, Ohio, U.S.
- Died: September 2, 1964 (aged 63) Cincinnati, Ohio, U.S.
- Party: Republican
- Spouse: Mary Renner
- Education: Miami University
- Profession: Attorney

Gordon G. Renner (November 17, 1900 – September 2, 1964) was the 89th Speaker of the Ohio House of Representatives, serving between 1951 and 1953. He was a member of the Republican Party (United States) and represented an area around Cincinnati, Ohio. He was elected on the first ballot by a vote of 55 to 27, beating out Kenneth A. Robinson for the speakership. William B. Saxbe served as majority leader and replaced Renner as the speaker the following session. He died from cancer in 1964.

His father was Otto Renner, a prominent attorney in Cincinnati, Ohio during the early 1900s.
