= 1970 Ohio gubernatorial election =

- November 3, 1970
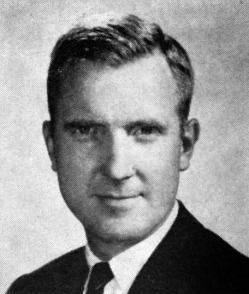

Nominee	John J. Gilligan	Roger Cloud
Party	Democratic	Republican
Popular vote	1,725,560	1,382,659
Percentage	54.19%	43.42%
- County results Gilligan: 40–50% 50–60% 60–70% Cloud: 40–50% 50–60% 60–70%
Governor before election
Jim Rhodes
Republican
Elected Governor
John J. Gilligan
Democratic

The 1970 Ohio gubernatorial election was held on November 3, 1970. Democratic nominee John J. Gilligan defeated Republican nominee Roger Cloud with 54.19% of the vote.

== Primary elections ==
Primary elections were held on May 5, 1970.

=== Democratic primary ===
==== Candidates ====
- John J. Gilligan, former U.S. Representative
- Robert E. Sweeney, former U.S. Representative
- Mark McElroy, former Ohio Attorney General

==== Results ====
Democratic primary results
Party	Candidate	Votes	%
Democratic	John J. Gilligan	547,675	59.69
Democratic	Robert E. Sweeney	216,195	23.56
Democratic	Mark McElroy	153,702	16.75
Total votes		917,572	100.00

=== Republican primary ===
==== Candidates ====
- Roger Cloud, Ohio State Auditor
- Donald "Buz" Lukens, U.S. Representative
- Paul W. Brown, Ohio Attorney General
- Albert Sealy

==== Results ====
Republican primary results
Party	Candidate	Votes	%
Republican	Roger Cloud	468,369	50.46
Republican	Donald "Buz" Lukens	283,257	30.52
Republican	Paul W. Brown	164,672	17.74
Republican	Albert Sealy	11,825	1.27
Total votes		928,131	100.00

== General election ==
=== Candidates ===
Major party candidates

- John J. Gilligan, Democratic
- Roger Cloud, Republican

Other candidates

- Edward T. Lawton, American Independent
- Joseph Pirincin, Socialist Labor

=== Results ===
1970 Ohio gubernatorial election
Party	Candidate	Votes	%	±%
Democratic	John J. Gilligan	1,725,560	54.19%	
Republican	Roger Cloud	1,382,659	43.42%	
American Independent	Edward T. Lawton	61,300	1.93%	
Socialist Labor	Joseph Pirincin	14,087	0.44%	
Majority		342,903		
Turnout		3,184,131		
Democratic gain from Republican		Swing		
