= Frazier Reams Jr. =

American politician (1929–2020)

Member of the Ohio Senate
- In office 1963–1966

Personal details
- Born: Henry Frazier Reams Jr. October 21, 1929 Toledo, Ohio, U.S.
- Died: July 20, 2020 (aged 90) Toledo, Ohio, U.S.
- Party: Democratic
- Spouse: Susan Rodawig Reams
- Relations: Frazier Reams (father)
- Children: Molly Reams Thompson, John Reams, David Reams, Edward Reams
- Education: Washington and Lee University
- Occupation: Attorney

Henry Frazier Reams Jr. (October 21, 1929 – July 20, 2020) was an American politician and attorney in Ohio. He was the son of U.S. Representative Frazier Reams Sr. Reams served in the Ohio State Senate from 1963 to 1966. In 1966, Reams was nominated by the Democratic party for the office of Governor of Ohio. He lost to the incumbent, Jim Rhodes.

== See also ==
- Ohio gubernatorial elections

Party political offices
Preceded by Michael V. DiSalle	Democratic Party nominee for Governor of Ohio; 1966	Succeeded by John J. Gilligan
