= Ohio National Guard =

Militia of the U.S. state of Ohio

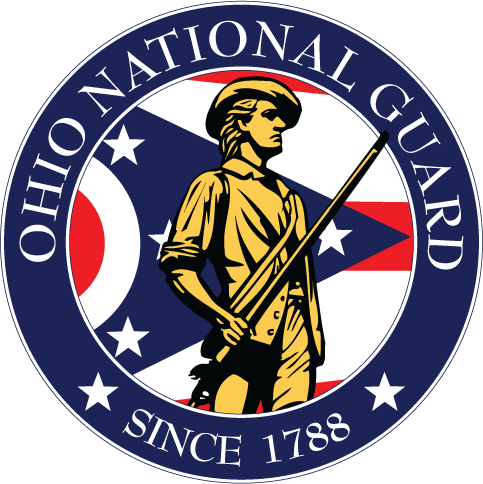
- Logo of the Ohio National Guard
- Active: 1803–present
- Country: United States
- Allegiance: Ohio
- Branch: United States Army; United States Air Force
- Type: National Guard
- Role: Militia
- Size: 17,000
- Part of: National Guard Bureau; Ohio Department of Military and Veterans Affairs

Commanders
- Governor and Commander in Chief: Mike DeWine
- Adjutant General: MG Matthew S. Woodruff

Insignia
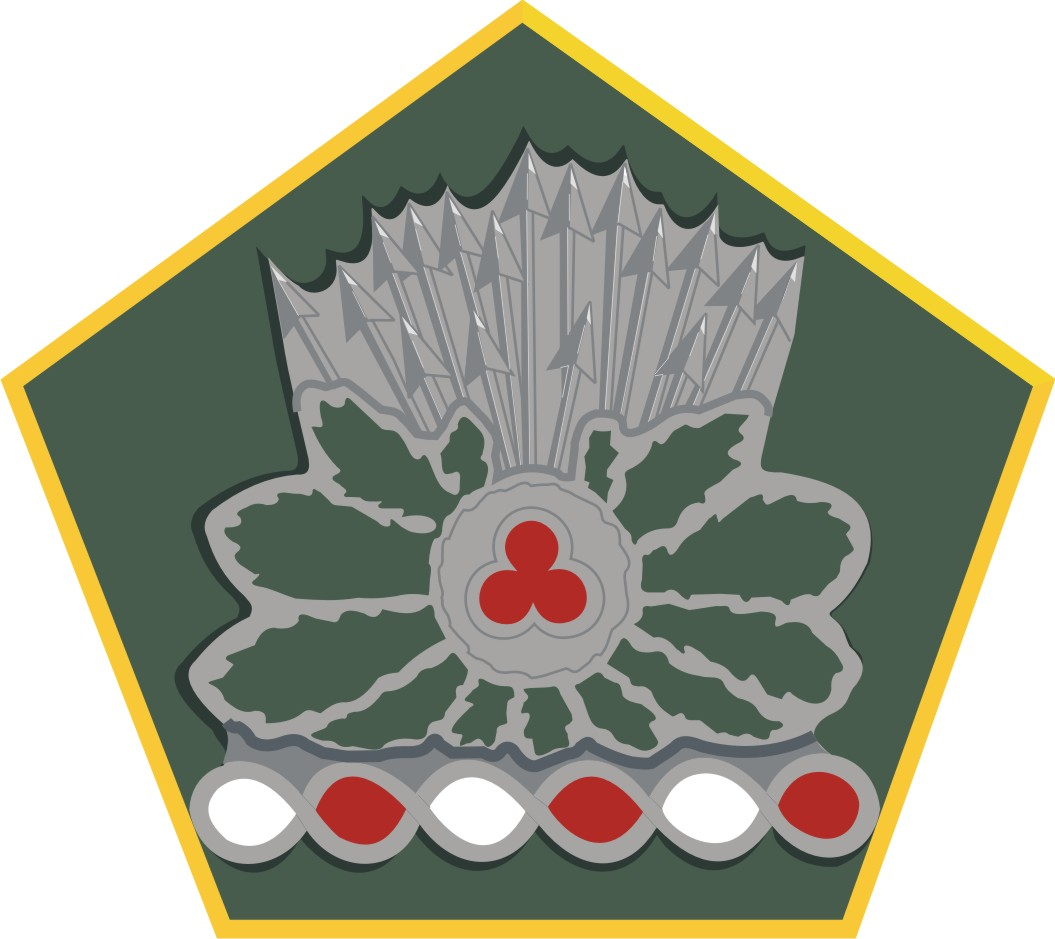
- Distinctive unit insignia

The Ohio National Guard comprises the Ohio Army National Guard and the Ohio Air National Guard. The commander-in-chief of the Ohio Army National Guard is the governor of the U.S. state of Ohio. If the Ohio Army National Guard is called to federal service, then the president of the United States becomes the commander-in-chief. The military commander of all forces in the State of Ohio is the Adjutant General, Brigadier General Matthew S. Woodruff is responsible for the command of 17,000 members, preparedness and readiness, installation management, and budget of the Ohio National Guard. The current Assistant Adjutant General for Army, with responsibility for overseeing the Ohio Army National Guard training and operations, is Colonel Jonathan M. Stewart. The current Assistant Adjutant General for Air is Brigadier General David B. Johnson with responsibility for overseeing the Ohio Air National Guard.

Ohio Army and Air National Guard units can be mobilized at any time by the governor of the State of Ohio upon declaration of a state of emergency or by the presidential order to supplement regular federal armed forces. Unlike Army Reserve members, National Guard members cannot be mobilized individually (except through voluntary transfers and temporary duty assignment (TDY), but only as part of their respective units). However, there has been a significant number of individual activations to support military operations since 2001. The legality of this policy has been a source of contention in some quarters. The Ohio Military Reserve and the Ohio Naval Militia constitute Ohio's state defense force, and augment the Ohio National Guard during stateside missions, especially when units of the National Guard are federalized.

The Ohio National Guard is made up of Citizen-Soldiers, meaning that the members of the National Guard lead civilian lives in addition to their duties as a soldier. As Citizen-Soldier members-only train with their National Guard Units for roughly two days a month (one weekend), and two weeks of training in the summer, called Annual Training (AT).

== History ==
=== Militia ===
In 1803 every state had a militia, so when Ohio was first formed as a state a militia for the state was created. This Ohio Militia was an important factor in the state's early history. The militia helped to subdue the Native American population in the state and aid in the War of 1812. After this, the militia experienced a decline and lost funding. This became a large problem at the onset of the Civil War seeing as Ohio's militia was extremely underdeveloped and the governor had to ask communities to supply units. Once more the Ohio Militia experienced a decline after the Civil War.

=== The Dick Act ===
In 1903 the federal government enacted the Dick Act. The Dick Act is responsible for creating the National Guard. The law was enacted mainly because of the poor condition of state militias and allowed the federal government to nationalize the National Guard and send them overseas or elsewhere in the country to assist with the Active Military.

=== World War I ===
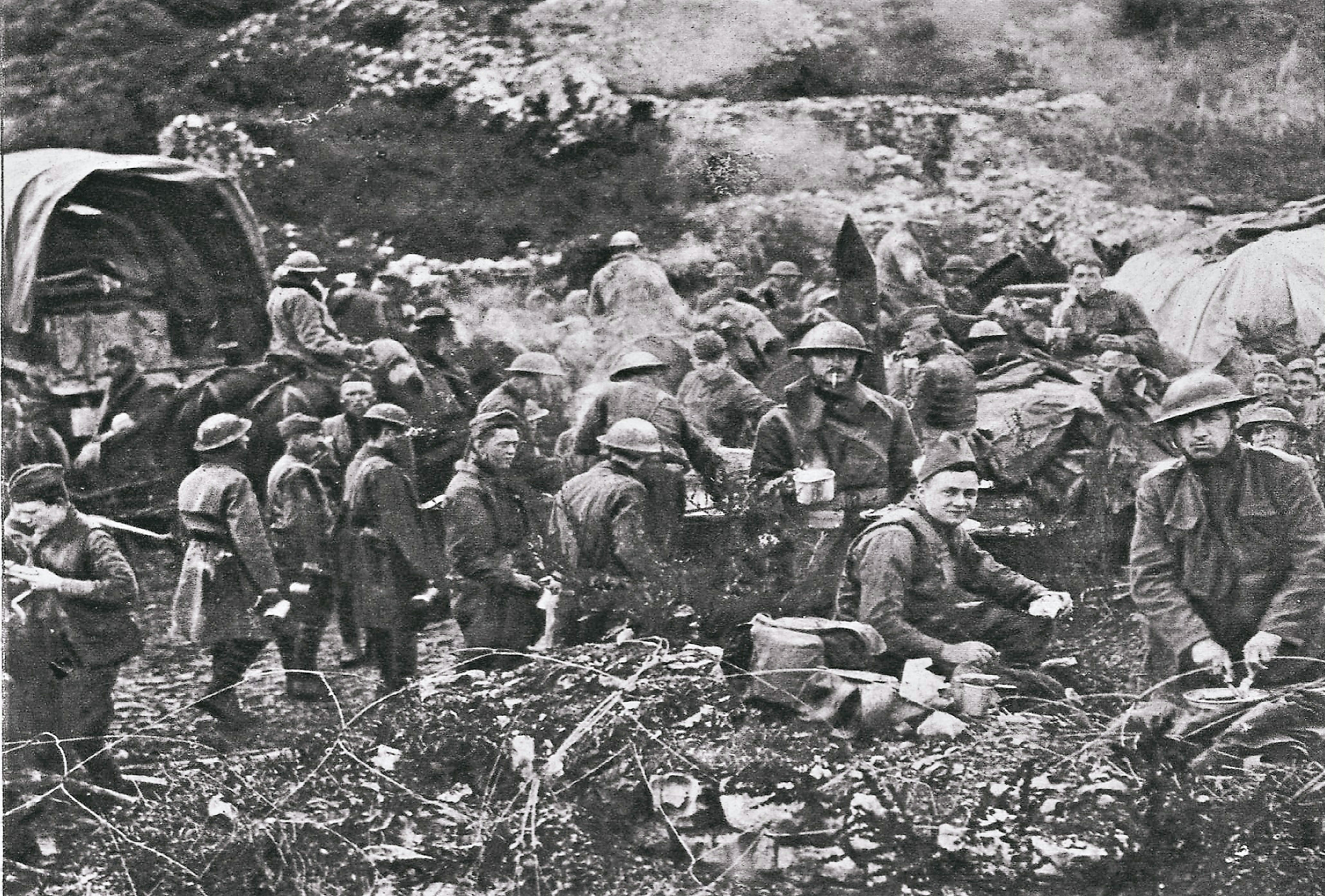
Soldiers of the 37th Infantry Division days before the start of the Meuse-Argonne Offensive.

In 1917 the draft was instituted in each state because of the Selective Services Act. The enactment of this law greatly expanded the Ohio National Guard and gave rise to the 37th Division. Dubbed the "Buckeye Division," they were sent to France as a part of the American Expeditionary Force. The 37th gained a reputation as a "crack unit" by displaying great combat effectiveness during multiple battles, including the Meuse-Argonne Offensive and the St. Mihiel Salient. This led to the unit being rated as one of the best six American Divisions by the German General Staff.

=== World War II ===
Following the attack on Pearl Harbor the United States entered the Second World War. During this time the 192nd Tank Battalion that included Company C formerly the 37th Tank Company was stationed in the Philippines. This unit became a large part of the "Battling Bastards of Bataan," which attempted to stem the invasion of Japanese forces in the Philippines. The 192nd was put into POW camps when the Japanese took the islands in 1942, along with the remainder of the US forces there.

The "Buckeye Division" served during the battle of Guadalcanal, New Guinea, and when the Philippines were re-taken. Despite suffering thousands of casualties throughout the war, the "Buckeye Division" had seven soldiers who were awarded the Medal Of Honor for their heroic actions.

=== Korea ===
During the Korean War, there were no major units within the Ohio National Guard that were deployed to the conflict. Instead, the "Buckeye" Division was mobilized as a training division in Fort Polk, Louisiana. It was also during this time that the Air Force broke off from the Active Duty Army which subsequently created the Air National Guard.

=== Vietnam ===
The Vietnam War saw many Ohio Army and Air National Guard units deployed in South Vietnam. During this time the Guard also helped local authorities back in the United States. This led to the Guard helping quell a rebellion at the Ohio Penitentiary, and help stop violence during the trucker's strike in 1970, and eventually the Kent State Shootings.

=== Kent State Shootings ===
On May 1, 1970, a protest of the Vietnam War was held on the campus of Kent State University. This protest led to reports of students lighting bonfires in the streets and throwing bottles at police cars. There were also reports of violence between police and students. This led to reinforcements being called for from neighboring towns and the governor by the mayor of Kent, Leroy Satrum. This led to the Ohio National Guard being sent to Kent State on the night of May 2, 1970. These Guardsmen stationed themselves at the then burned down ROTC adjacent to the commons of the university. On May 4, 1970 a protest took place on the commons of the university. The National Guard and police asked the protesters to disperse and when they refused the Guardsmen, armed with M1 Garands, pushed the group towards a football practice field. The protesters then threw rocks at the Guardsmen, who following that retreated up to the top of a hill where they began to fire shots. Some Guardsmen fired in the air while others fired directly into the crowd of unarmed protesters, killing four and wounding nine others.

=== Operation Desert Storm ===
During Operation Desert Storm the Ohio National Guard mainly supported the larger military force. The Guard sent small units and provided transportation and supplies to the war front. Following Desert Storm, Ohio National Guard units were mobilized to continue the military presence in the region.

=== Post 9-11 ===
Following the events of September 11th, 2001 the US Military was sent to the Middle East. The Ohio National Guard also took part in these operations, sending individuals and small units to assist the larger military force there. In the fall of 2011 though, the Ohio National Guard sent the 37th infantry division (the 'Buckeye' Division) in support of Operation Enduring Freedom. This was the largest overseas mobilization since World War II for the Guard. The Ohio National Guard has also assisted in more domestic tragedies, having sent assistance during Hurricane Katrina, Hurricane Harvey, and Hurricane Irma. Assistance was also sent to Puerto Rico following the disaster caused by Hurricane Maria. In fall of 2019 legislation creating the Ohio Cyber Reserve was passed.

== Accolades ==
The Ohio National Guard participates in an annual event put on by the Army called the Army Communities of Excellence. This program evaluates different organizations in the military based upon the performance of an Army installation run by the organization. The Ohio National Guard has won this award multiple times. The Guard won in 2003, 2004, 2006, 2009. 2015, and in 2018. The Ohio National Guard also won Rookie of the Year in 2002.
