= Roger Cloud =

American politician

Speaker of the Ohio House of Representatives
- In office 1955–1958
- Preceded by: William B. Saxbe
- Succeeded by: James A. Lantz
- In office 1961–1966
- Preceded by: James A. Lantz
- Succeeded by: Charles F. Kurfess

Ohio State Auditor
- In office 1965–1966
- Governor: Jim Rhodes
- Preceded by: Chester W. Goble
- Succeeded by: Archer E. Reilly
- In office 1967–1971
- Preceded by: Archer E. Reilly
- Succeeded by: Joseph T. Ferguson

Personal details
- Born: December 4, 1909 De Graff, Ohio, U.S.
- Died: April 20, 1988 (aged 78) Columbus, Ohio, U.S.
- Resting place: Green Lawn Cemetery, Columbus, Ohio
- Party: Republican

Roger Ellwood Cloud (December 4, 1909 – April 20, 1988), was an American politician of the Republican party who represented Ohio in several capacities.

Having worked as a farmer and a factory worker, Cloud won election to the local school board in DeGraff. In 1940, he won office as a county commissioner in Logan County, Ohio. He served in this office from 1941 to 1949.

In 1948, Cloud ran successfully for a seat in the Ohio House of Representatives, serving from 1949. Cloud held the office of Speaker of the House from 1955 to 1959 and from 1961 to 1967.

In 1965, Ohio State Auditor Roger W. Tracy died and Governor James A. Rhodes appointed Chester W. Goble as a temporary replacement. Rhodes chose Cloud to complete Tracy's term as auditor and in 1966, Cloud was elected to the position and served in that office from 1967 to 1971.

In 1970, Cloud was nominated for Governor of Ohio as incumbent Jim Rhodes was term-limited. He defeated Congressman Donald "Buz" Lukens in the primary, but lost to Democrat John J. Gilligan. That year the Ohio Republican Party was caught up in the "Crofters" scandal where the Republican state treasurer, John Herbert, had invested state money in improper investments with a big campaign contributor. After this defeat, Cloud retired from politics.

Cloud's wife was the former Llewellyn DeWeese; they were married in 1934.

== See also ==
- Ohio gubernatorial elections
- Ohio State Auditor elections

Political offices
Preceded by Chester W. Goble	Ohio State Auditor; 1965–1966	Succeeded by Archer E. Reilly
Preceded by Archer E. Reilly	Ohio State Auditor; 1967–1971	Succeeded by Joseph T. Ferguson
Party political offices
Preceded by Archer E. Reilly	Republican nominee for Ohio State Auditor; 1966	Succeeded by Roger Tracy
Preceded by Jim Rhodes	Republican Party nominee for Governor of Ohio; 1970	Succeeded by Jim Rhodes
