= Mark C. Schinnerer =

American politician

Mark Schinnerer

Member of the Ohio House of Representatives from the 49th district
- In office January 3, 1967 – December 31, 1970
- Preceded by: At-Large District
- Succeeded by: Richard Celeste

Personal details
- Born: June 3, 1899 Riley, Indiana, U.S.
- Died: October 27, 1978 (aged 79) Cleveland, Ohio, U.S.
- Party: Republican

Mark Christopher Schinnerer (June 3, 1899 – October 27, 1978) was a state representative from Ohio, as well as a former SuperIntendent for Cleveland Public Schools.
