= LeRoy Satrom =

American politician

LeRoy Martin Satrom (February 4, 1919 – September 8, 2004) was an American politician and engineer in Portage County, Ohio. He served as county engineer, city engineer, city councilman, and mayor. Satrom is most remembered for his 1970–1972 tenure as mayor of Kent, Ohio, specifically for his request for National Guard assistance in the events leading up to the May 4, 1970 Kent State shootings, where four students were killed and nine wounded. He later served four terms as Portage County engineer, and retired in 1988.

== Early life and career ==
Satrom was born in Galesburg, North Dakota. After graduating from high school he worked on the third lock project for the Panama Canal before he joined the United States Army in 1943 and served in Europe during World War II. At the conclusion of his military service in 1946, he attended Case Institute of Technology in Cleveland (now Case Western Reserve University), and graduated in 1947. He first served in Portage County, Ohio, government in 1947 as deputy engineer, a position he held until 1952, and moved to Portage County in 1951. Satrom was first elected to Kent City Council in 1963 after having also served as city engineer for Kent and neighboring Ravenna.

== Mayor ==
Satrom, a Democrat, was elected in 1969 as the first full-time mayor of Kent, taking office in early 1970. Five months later, after a night of rioting in the downtown area of Kent on May 1–2, 1970, he called Ohio Governor James A. Rhodes and requested that the National Guard be sent to the campus of Kent State University to deal with the unrest, which was mainly in response to April 29, 1970, announcement of the United States' invasion of Cambodia in the Vietnam War. The Guard was deployed to the campus on May 3 and the city was placed under martial law that evening. On May 4, while breaking up a mid-day protest on the campus, the Guardsmen shot into the crowd, killing four students and wounding nine others. The university was closed immediately and the city of Kent was placed under a 5:00 PM curfew with all entrances to the city blocked off.

Satrom seldom appeared at events that placed significance on his role in the Kent State shootings. He stated, however, that he never regretted calling the Guard into Kent, but was "shocked and saddened" by the events that transpired at Kent State. He said in 1990: "It was a very trying time. No one wanted to see people killed. We didn't expect that at all. We wanted them (the Guard) to keep the peace."

During his tenure as Mayor of Kent, he also oversaw the transition of the Kent Fire Department from a volunteer force to a full-time force. He was also part of several infrastructure improvements made in Kent during the 1970s, including construction of what became Haymaker Parkway, completed in 1975. He was elected Portage County engineer in 1972 and began his term there in 1973.

== Later career ==
Satrom subsequently served four terms as Portage County engineer (1973-1988) and remained active in the county political party. In 2004, he donated his papers to Kent State University, which has since put much of the material online. Satrom died September 8, 2004, in Ravenna, Ohio at the age of 85.
