= 1974 Ohio gubernatorial election =

- November 5, 1974
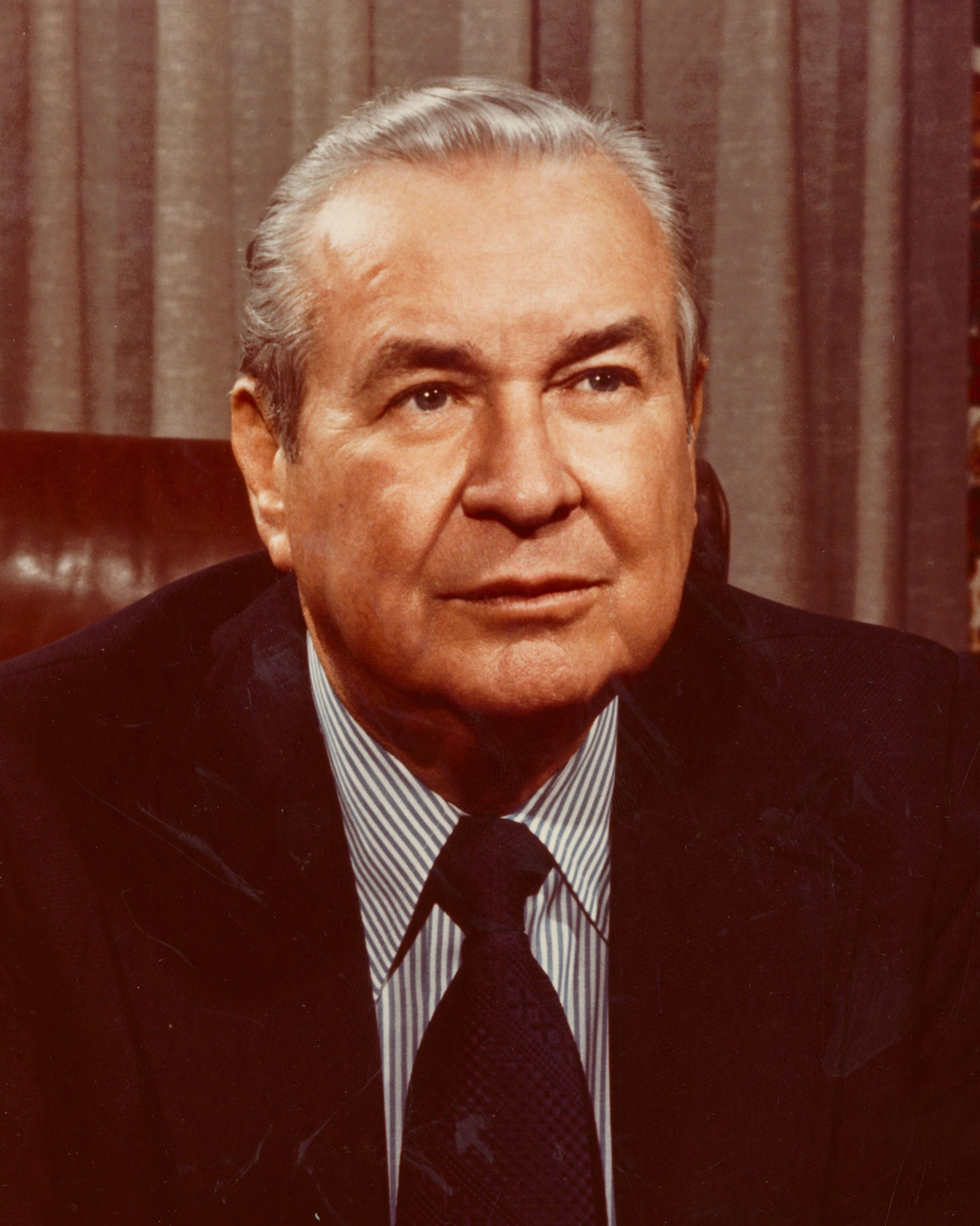

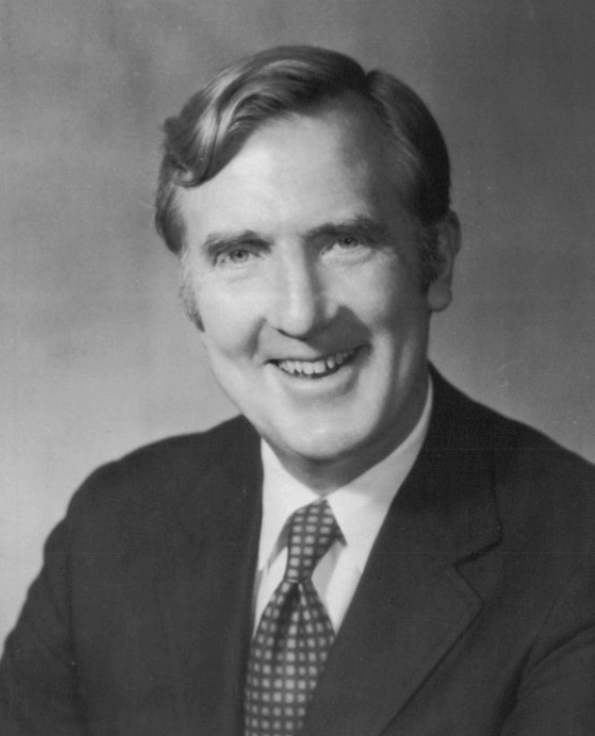
Nominee	Jim Rhodes	John J. Gilligan
Party	Republican	Democratic
Popular vote	1,493,679	1,482,191
Percentage	48.62%	48.25%
- County results Rhodes: 40–50% 50–60% 60–70% 70–80% Gilligan: 40–50% 50–60% 60–70%
Governor before election
John J. Gilligan
Democratic
Elected Governor
Jim Rhodes
Republican

The 1974 Ohio gubernatorial election was held on November 5, 1974. Republican nominee Jim Rhodes narrowly defeated Democratic incumbent John J. Gilligan with 48.62% of the vote.

== Primary elections ==
Primary elections were held on May 7, 1974.

=== Democratic primary ===
==== Candidates ====
- John J. Gilligan, incumbent governor
- James D. Nolan

==== Results ====
Democratic primary results
Party	Candidate	Votes	%
Democratic	John J. Gilligan (incumbent)	713,488	70.58
Democratic	James D. Nolan	297,244	29.41
Total votes		1,010,853	100.00

=== Republican primary ===
==== Candidates ====
- Bert Dawson Jr.
- Charles E. Fry, state representative
- Jim Rhodes, former governor

==== Results ====
Republican primary results
Party	Candidate	Votes	%
Republican	Jim Rhodes	385,669	62.76
Republican	Charles E. Fry	183,899	29.93
Republican	Bert Dawson Jr.	44,938	7.31
Total votes		614,506	100.00

== General election ==
=== Candidates ===
Major party candidates

- John J. Gilligan, Democratic
- Jim Rhodes, Republican

Other candidates

- Nancy B. Lazar, Independent

=== Results ===
1974 Ohio gubernatorial election
Party	Candidate	Votes	%	±%
Republican	Jim Rhodes	1,493,679	48.62%	
Democratic	John J. Gilligan (incumbent)	1,482,191	48.25%	
Independent	Nancy B. Lazar	95,625	3.11%	
Majority		11,488		
Turnout		3,071,495		
Republican gain from Democratic		Swing		
