= Dick Celeste =

American diplomat and politician (born 1937)

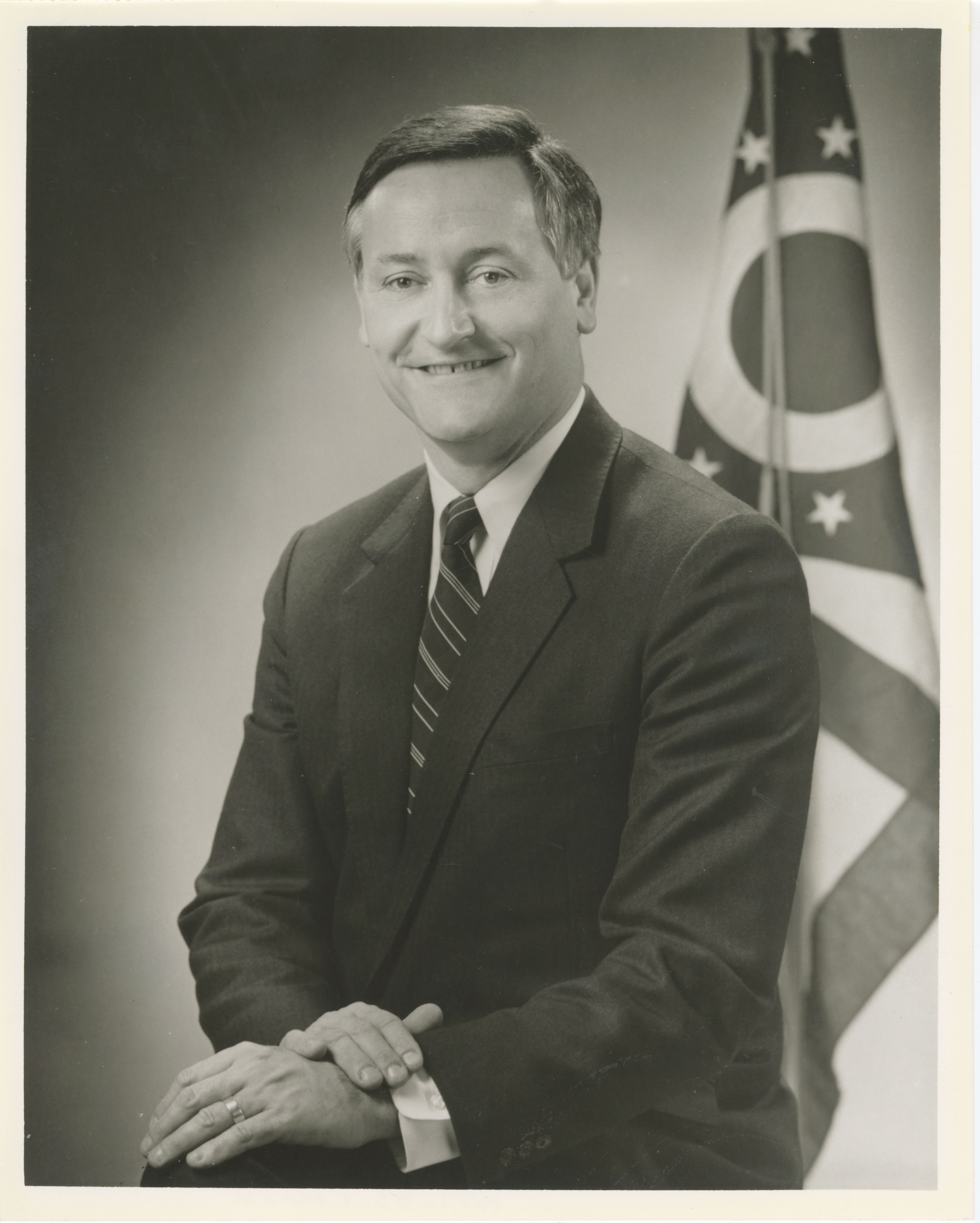
- Official portrait, c. 1983–1991

United States Ambassador to India
- In office November 28, 1997 – April 25, 2001
- President: Bill Clinton; George W. Bush
- Preceded by: Frank G. Wisner
- Succeeded by: Robert Blackwill

64th Governor of Ohio
- In office January 10, 1983 – January 14, 1991
- Lieutenant: Myrl Shoemaker; Paul Leonard
- Preceded by: Jim Rhodes
- Succeeded by: George Voinovich

9th Director of the Peace Corps
- In office April 27, 1979 – January 20, 1981
- President: Jimmy Carter
- Preceded by: Carolyn R. Payton
- Succeeded by: Loret Ruppe

55th Lieutenant Governor of Ohio
- In office January 13, 1975 – January 8, 1979
- Governor: Jim Rhodes
- Preceded by: John Brown
- Succeeded by: George Voinovich

Member of the Ohio House of Representatives from the 5th district
- In office January 3, 1971 – December 31, 1974
- Preceded by: Mark C. Schinnerer
- Succeeded by: Francine Panehal

12th President of Colorado College
- In office July 1, 2002 – June 30, 2011
- Preceded by: Kathryn Mohrman
- Succeeded by: Jill Tiefenthaler

Personal details
- Born: Richard Frank Celeste; November 11, 1937 (age 89) Cleveland, Ohio, U.S.
- Party: Democratic
- Spouses: Dagmar Braun (m. 1962; div. 1995); Jacqueline Lundquist (m. 1995)
- Children: 7
- Education: Yale University (BA); Exeter College, Oxford (attended)

Richard Frank Celeste (born November 11, 1937) is an American former politician, diplomat, and college administrator. A member of the Democratic Party, he was the 64th governor of Ohio from 1983 to 1991. Celeste also served as the 55th lieutenant governor of Ohio from 1975 to 1979, 9th director of the Peace Corps from 1979 to 1981, and as United States Ambassador to India from 1997 to 2001. After leaving politics, he was the president of Colorado College. Celeste remains the last Democrat to win re-election as governor of Ohio.

== Early life ==
Celeste was born on November 11, 1937 in Cleveland, Ohio, the son of Margaret Louis and Frank Palm Celeste. His father was born in Cerisano, Italy. He grew up in the suburb of Lakewood, Ohio, where his father served as mayor from 1956 to 1964. He graduated from Lakewood High School in 1955.

Celeste graduated magna cum laude from Yale University in 1959, where he was a member of Phi Beta Kappa. He then received a Rhodes Scholarship to attend Exeter College at Oxford University, where he is an Honorary Fellow. After returning to the United States, Celeste served as staff liaison office in the Peace Corps and as special assistant to Ambassador Chester Bowles.

== Career ==
=== Early political career ===
Celeste was elected to the Ohio House of Representatives from Cuyahoga County in 1970. His Ohio House District included western Cleveland and Lakewood, where he grew up and his father had served as mayor. During his time as a legislator he focused on constituent services and built his public profile.

Celeste was subsequently elected the 55th lieutenant governor of Ohio in 1974, defeating Republican John William Brown and serving under incumbent Republican Jim Rhodes. At the time, Ohio's lieutenant governor was elected separately from the governor, so the victors could be of different parties. Rhodes reportedly told Celeste to take up golfing because he was "not going to give [Celeste] a damn thing to do". Celeste challenged Rhodes for governor in the 1978 Ohio gubernatorial election, but lost. President Jimmy Carter subsequently appointed Celeste as director of the Peace Corps from 1979 to 1981, where he was responsible for programs in 53 countries.

=== Governor of Ohio (1983–1991) ===
In the 1982 Ohio gubernatorial election, Celeste defeated Attorney General William J. Brown and former Cincinnati Mayor Jerry Springer in the Democratic primary, and then the Republican candidate Clarence J. "Bud" Brown Jr. to become governor of Ohio. Celeste was re-elected in 1986, defeating Republican candidate and former governor Jim Rhodes. In 1988, he served as the Chairman of the Midwestern Governors Association.

As governor, Celeste increased support for human services, mental health & addiction recovery services, funding for education and children services including providing onsite daycare for state employees. Before the Celeste era, Ohio ranked near the bottom among states in funding for these programs. Celeste and the Democratic-controlled legislature increased the state income tax by approximately 40% while also retaining a temporary tax of 50% instituted by the Republican predecessors. Celeste is noted for opening many government positions to African Americans and women—he hired more women to cabinet positions than all previous governors combined. Celeste also allowed state employee unions to negotiate wages and benefits, rather than just working conditions.

At the end of his last term, Celeste ordered the release of 25 women, including 10 convicted murderers, on the ground that they had committed their crimes under battered woman syndrome. He also commuted the sentences of 8 Ohio death row inmates to life terms. Among them was Debra Brown's along with the sentences of most alleged battered women serving sentences at Marysville state prison for murdering their alleged aggressors. He also commuted Donald Lee Maurer to life in prison. Maurer had been convicted of raping and killing his 8 year old Massillon neighbor Dawn Marie Hendershot in the early 1980s.

Under the Celestes, the Governor's art exhibits, chamber music concerts and First Lady's spiritual retreats and theology gatherings as well as Christmas and Hanukkah parties for neighborhood kids became regular seasonal events. The Residence Gardens, especially the rose garden, one of the oldest in the nation, were reconstituted and The Friends of the Residence were formed, with Les Wexner as their first president, to help raise private funds to defray the cost of those improvements.

=== Ambassador to India (1997–2001) ===
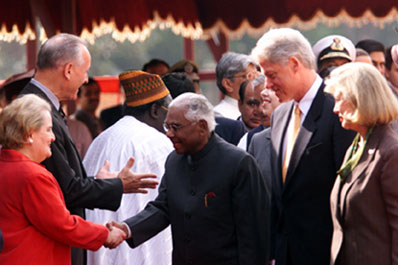
Celeste and President Bill Clinton with President K. R. Narayanan, 2000

Celeste then established the consulting firm Celeste and Sabety Ltd. in Columbus, Ohio. After he served as the director of the Democratic National Committee's healthcare campaign in 1993, President Bill Clinton appointed him as United States Ambassador to India, a position he served in from 1997 to 2001.

=== President of Colorado College (2002–2011) ===
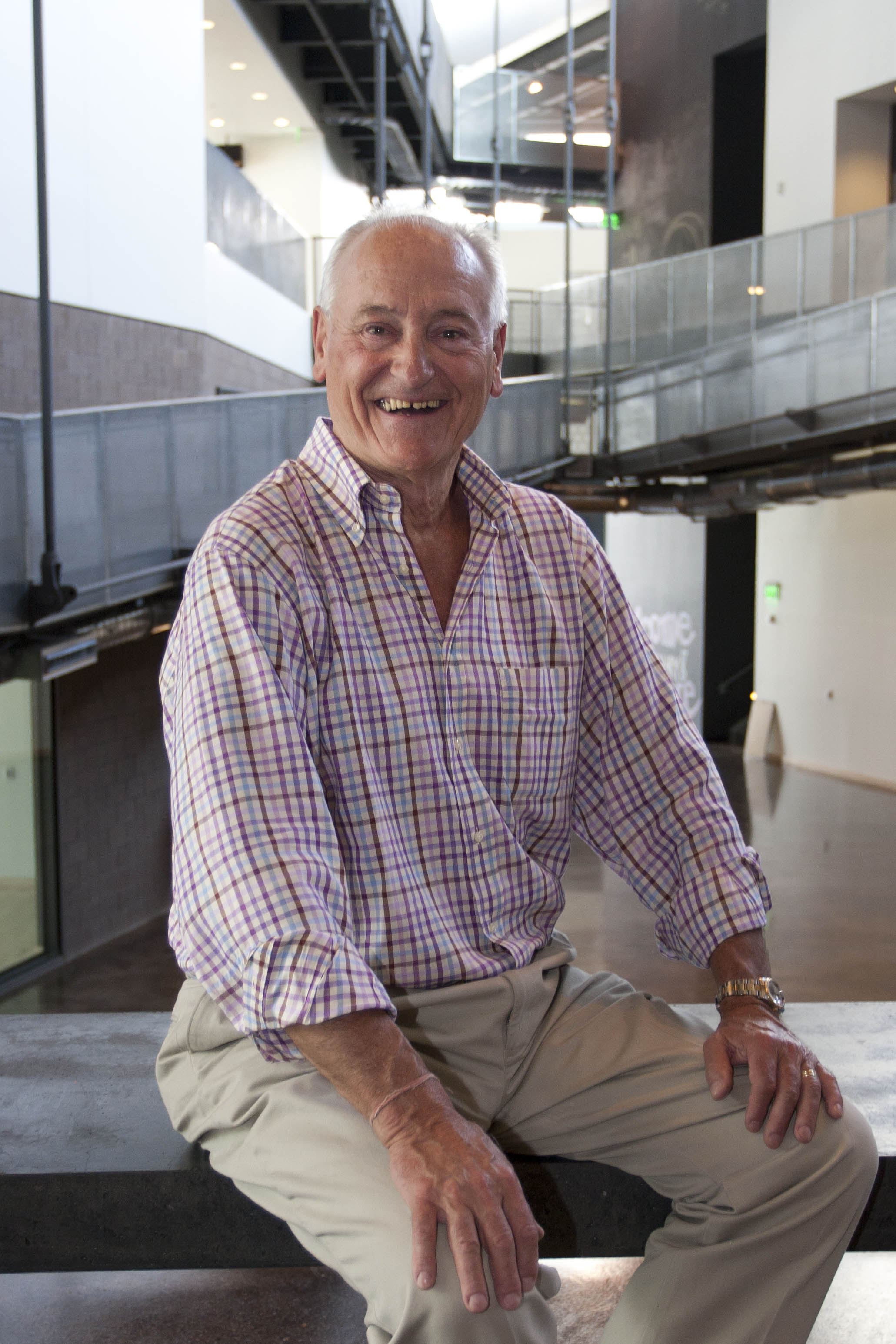
Celeste in 2008 as president of Colorado College

Celeste was inaugurated as the 12th president of Colorado College in 2002. During his tenure as president, Celeste raised $200 million for such things as capital improvements and scholarships to help disadvantaged and minority students. His other accomplishments included the addition of 20 tenure-track faculty positions, a large increase in the size of the student applicant pool, from 3,533 in 2003 to 4,455 in 2010, and an increase in selectivity, with 55.9 percent of applicants accepted in 2003 to 33.3 percent accepted in 2010. Celeste oversaw major renovations of campus buildings, including Palmer Hall, Cossitt Hall and Packard Hall; construction of the interdisciplinary Edith Kinney Gaylord Cornerstone Arts Center.

In 2004, a Jewish group called for Celeste's resignation after he invited a high-profile Palestinian to give a lecture. He was the president of the Colorado Springs Downtown Partnership, the Colorado Economics Future Panel, the NCAA Presidential Task Force on the Future of Intercollegiate Athletics, and the Colorado Forum, which tackles public policy issues. Celeste retired as president of Colorado College on June 30, 2011, and was succeeded by Jill Tiefenthaler.

=== Other activities ===
Celeste is a member of the advisory board of the Roosevelt Institution, a student think tank. He is a member of the Council on Foreign Relations. Celeste, along with Thomas Kean who co-chaired the 9/11 Commission, co-chairs the Homeland Security Project for The Century Foundation. He also sits on the board of the Independent Strategic Assessment Group, United States Northern Command (NORTHCOM), which is the military command over the USA established in the wake of the attacks of September 11. Celeste joined the board of Directors of Glimcher Realty Trust in September 2007. Celeste has also been a member of the CHF International Board of Trustees since January 2012.

He is currently on the board of directors for Battelle for Kids, a not-for-profit organization dedicated to moving education forward for students by supporting the educators who work with them every day.

In 2020, Celeste, with another former governor Bob Taft were appointed to establish and lead a task force to help expand COVID-19 testing in Ohio during the pandemic. In November 2026, Celeste was named an honorary co-chair for the inaugural committee of Governor-elect Amy Acton, alongside all other then-living former governors.

== Personal life ==
Celeste met Dagmar Braun while studying at Oxford University, and they married in Austria in 1962. They had six children and divorced in 1995. Celeste then married Jacqueline Lundquist, and they have one child. Celeste has 13 grandchildren, including two who were students at Colorado College and one who is a graduate of Case Western Reserve University.

His brother, Ted Celeste, was the Democratic nominee in the 2000 United States Senate election in Ohio and later served in the Ohio House of Representatives from 2007 to 2012. In 2022, Celeste's autobiography, In the Heart of it All: An Unvarnished Account of My Life in Public Service, was published.

== Legacy ==
The Celeste Center at the Ohio Expo Center and State Fair in Columbus, Ohio, is named in honor of Celeste. The Richard F. Celeste Laboratory of Chemistry on the Columbus Campus of the Ohio State University is named in honor of the former Governor. In addition, the Richard F. Celeste Theater at the Cornerstone Arts Center of Colorado College is named in honor of his tenure as president.

== See also ==
- Ohio gubernatorial elections

Party political offices
Preceded by Anthony O. Calabrese	Democratic nominee for Lieutenant Governor of Ohio; 1974	Succeeded by Michael Dorrian
Preceded by John J. Gilligan	Democratic nominee for Governor of Ohio; 1978, 1982, 1986	Succeeded by Tony Celebrezze
Preceded by James Blanchard	Chair of the Democratic Governors Association; 1989–1990	Succeeded by Roy Romer
Political offices
Preceded by John Brown	Lieutenant Governor of Ohio; 1975–1979	Succeeded by George Voinovich
Preceded by Jim Rhodes	Governor of Ohio; 1983–1991	Succeeded by George Voinovich
Government offices
Preceded by Carolyn R. Payton	Director of the Peace Corps; 1979–1981	Succeeded by Loret Ruppe
Diplomatic posts
Preceded by Frank G. Wisner	United States Ambassador to India; 1997–2001	Succeeded by Robert Blackwill
Academic offices
Preceded by Kathryn Mohrman	President of Colorado College; 2002–2011	Succeeded by Jill Tiefenthaler
U.S. order of precedence (ceremonial)
Preceded by Martha McSally as Former U.S. Senator	Order of precedence of the United States; Within Ohio	Succeeded by Nancy Hollister as Former Governor
Preceded by Bill Haslam as Former Governor	Order of precedence of the United States; Outside Ohio	Succeeded by Nancy Hollister as Former Governor
