= 1978 Ohio gubernatorial election =

- November 7, 1978
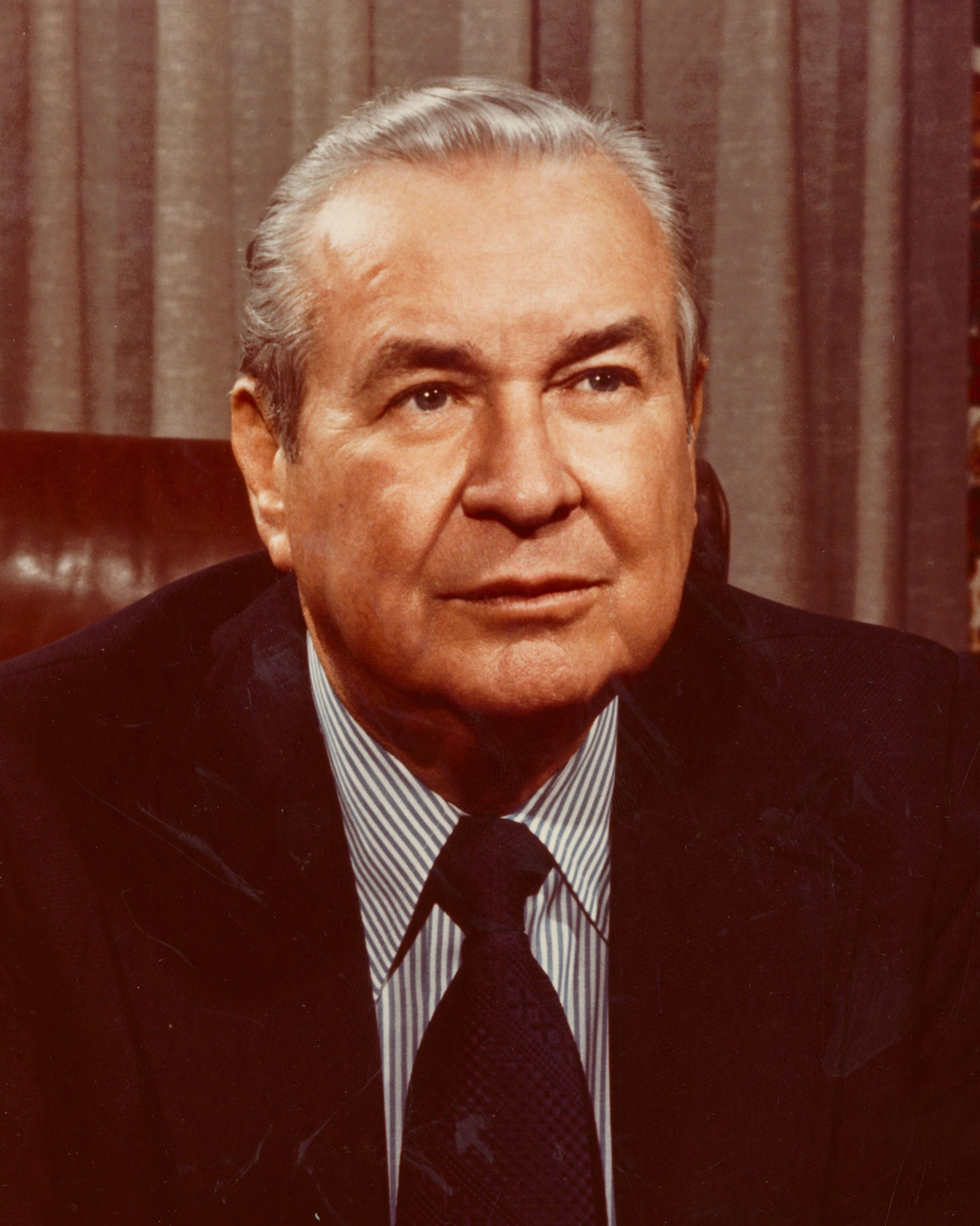

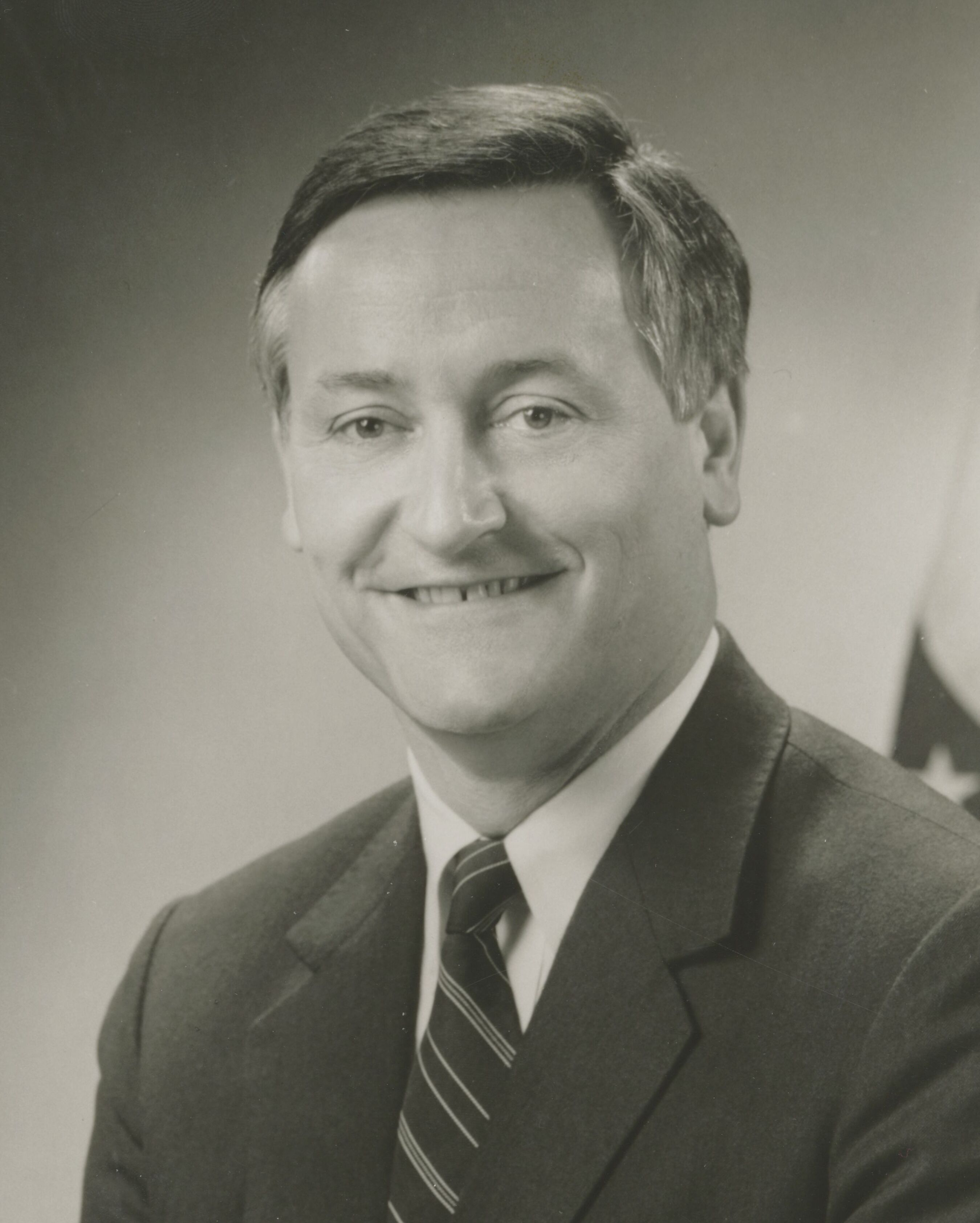
Nominee	Jim Rhodes	Dick Celeste
Party	Republican	Democratic
Running mate	George Voinovich	Michael J. Dorrian
Popular vote	1,402,167	1,354,631
Percentage	49.31%	47.64%
- County results Rhodes: 40–50% 50–60% 60–70% Celeste: 40–50% 50–60% 60–70%
Governor before election
Jim Rhodes
Republican
Elected Governor
Jim Rhodes
Republican

The 1978 Ohio gubernatorial election was held on November 7, 1978. Incumbent Republican Jim Rhodes defeated Democratic nominee Dick Celeste with 49.31% of the vote.

== Primary elections ==
Primary elections were held on June 6, 1978.

=== Democratic primary ===
==== Candidates ====
- Dick Celeste, incumbent Lieutenant Governor
- Dale R. Reusch

==== Results ====
Democratic primary results
Party	Candidate	Votes	%
Democratic	Dick Celeste	491,524	84.80
Democratic	Dale R. Reusch	88,134	15.20
Total votes		579,658	100.00

=== Republican primary ===
==== Candidates ====
- Jim Rhodes, incumbent Governor
- Charles Kurfess, State Representative

==== Results ====
Republican primary results
Party	Candidate	Votes	%
Republican	Jim Rhodes (incumbent)	393,632	67.73
Republican	Charles Kurfess	187,544	32.27
Total votes		581,176	100.00

== General election ==
=== Candidates ===
Major party candidates

- Jim Rhodes, Republican
- Dick Celeste, Democratic

Other candidates

- Patricia Wright, Independent
- John O'Neill, Independent
- Allan Friedman, Independent

=== Results ===
1978 Ohio gubernatorial election
Party	Candidate	Votes	%	±%
Republican	Jim Rhodes (incumbent)	1,402,167	49.31%	+0.69%
Democratic	Dick Celeste	1,354,631	47.64%	−0.61%
Independent	Patricia Wright	35,164	1.24%	N/A
Independent	John O'Neill	29,413	1.03%	N/A
Independent	Allan Friedman	21,951	0.77%	N/A
Majority		47,536		
Turnout		2,843,326		
Republican hold		Swing		
