= Jim Rhodes =

American politician (1909–2001)

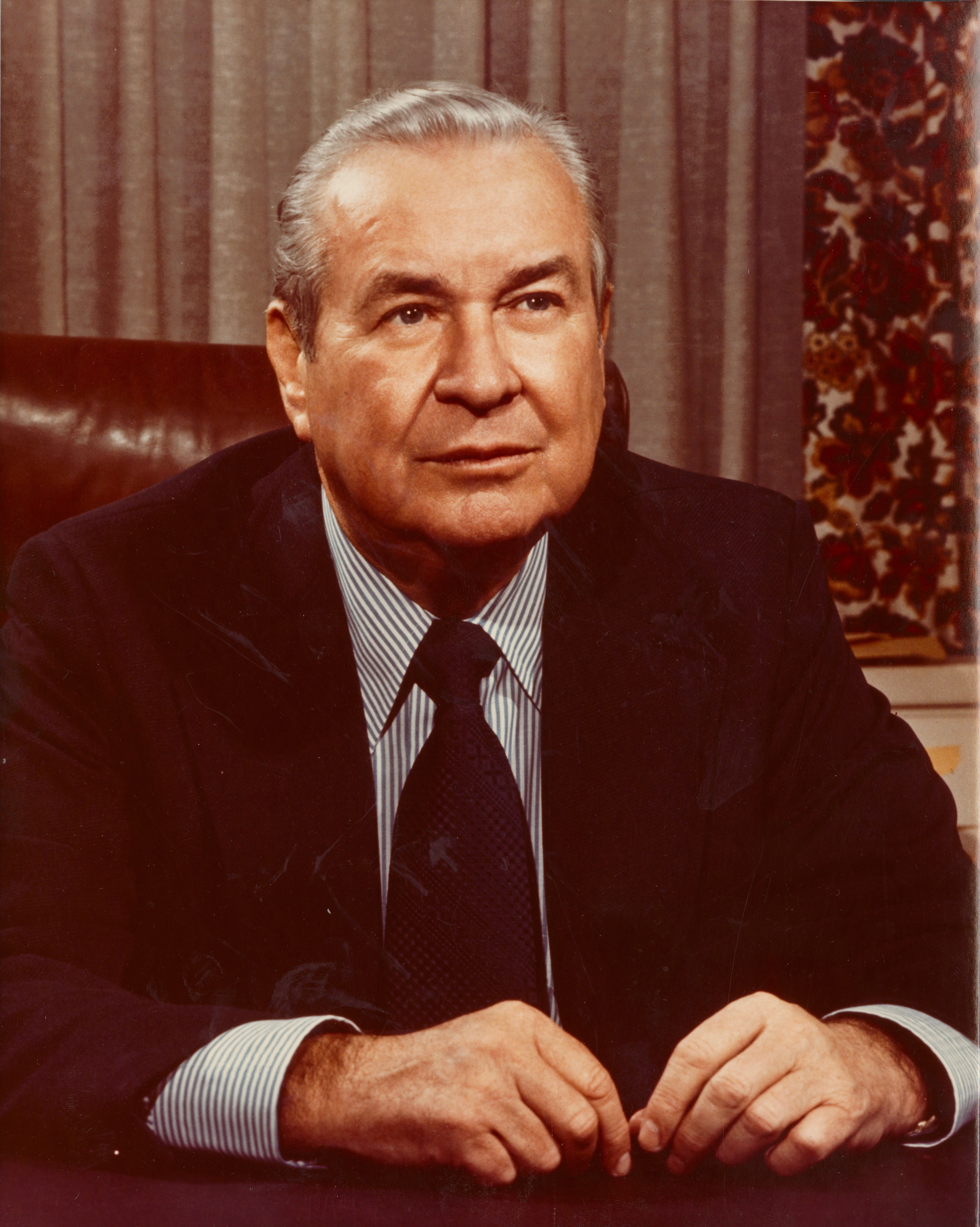

61st and 63rd Governor of Ohio
- In office January 13, 1975 – January 10, 1983
- Lieutenant: Dick Celeste (1975–1979); George Voinovich (1979); Vacant (1979–1983)
- Preceded by: John J. Gilligan
- Succeeded by: Dick Celeste
- In office January 14, 1963 – January 11, 1971
- Lieutenant: John W. Brown
- Preceded by: Michael DiSalle
- Succeeded by: John J. Gilligan

21st Ohio State Auditor
- In office 1953–1963
- Governor: Frank J. Lausche; John William Brown; C. William O'Neill; Michael DiSalle
- Preceded by: Joseph T. Ferguson
- Succeeded by: Roger W. Tracy Jr.

44th Mayor of Columbus
- In office 1944–1952
- Preceded by: Floyd F. Green
- Succeeded by: Robert T. Oestreicher

Personal details
- Born: James Allen Rhodes; September 13, 1909 Coalton, Ohio, U.S.
- Died: March 4, 2001 (aged 91) Columbus, Ohio, U.S.
- Resting place: Green Lawn Cemetery
- Party: Republican
- Spouse: Helen Rawlins (m. 1941; died 1987)
- Children: 3
- Education: Ohio State University (attended)

James Allen Rhodes (September 13, 1909 – March 4, 2001) was an American politician who served as the 61st and 63rd governor of Ohio from 1963 to 1971 and again from 1975 to 1983. A member of the Republican Party, he was the Ohio state auditor from 1953 to 1963 and the mayor of Columbus, Ohio, from 1944 to 1952. Rhodes was one of only seven U.S. governors to serve four four-year terms in office (Note: The other six being Edwin Edwards, George Wallace, Jim Hunt, Bill Janklow, Jerry Brown, and Terry Branstad.) and is tied for the sixth-longest gubernatorial tenure in post-Constitutional U.S. history at 5,840 days.

Rhodes's tenure as governor had an emphasis on developing infrastructure and higher education in Ohio. In 1970, Rhodes sent Ohio Army National Guard troops on to the Kent State University campus at the request of Mayor LeRoy Satrom, resulting in the Kent State shootings where guardsmen killed four students and wounded nine others. His administrations also increased international trade initiatives, particularly in China–United States relations during the late 1970s.

== Early life and education ==
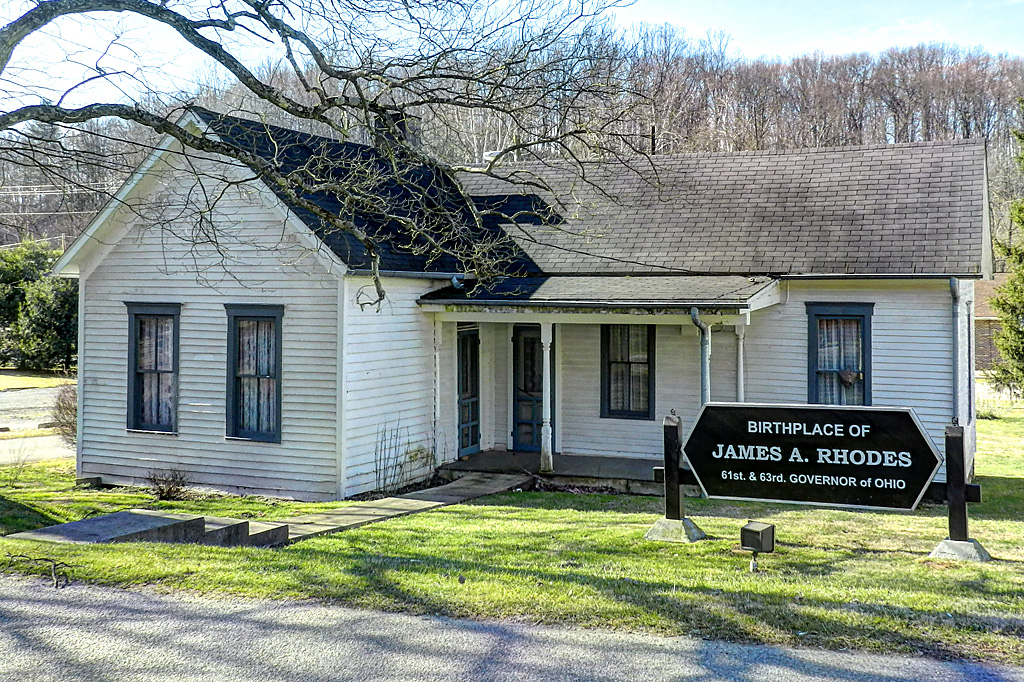
Rhodes's birthplace in Coalton, Ohio

Rhodes was born on September 13, 1909 in Coalton, Ohio, to James and Susan Howe Rhodes, who were of Welsh descent. Rhodes has commented that the reason he and his family were Republicans was because of the respect his father, a mine superintendent, had for John L. Lewis, a prominent Republican union activist. When Rhodes was nine, his father died, and the family moved north to Springfield, Ohio, where Rhodes graduated from Springfield High School and played on the football team. Subsequently, the family moved again to Columbus, Ohio, because Rhodes earned a modest basketball scholarship to Ohio State University. Although Rhodes dropped out after his first quarter, he is often described as a "student" or "alumnus" of Ohio State.

After dropping out of college, Rhodes opened a business called Jim's Place across from the university on North High Street. Jim's Place has been described as a place where one could buy anything, from doughnuts and hamburgers to stag film, or place bets on numbers games.

== Career ==
=== Mayor of Columbus and Ohio State Auditor (1944–1963) ===
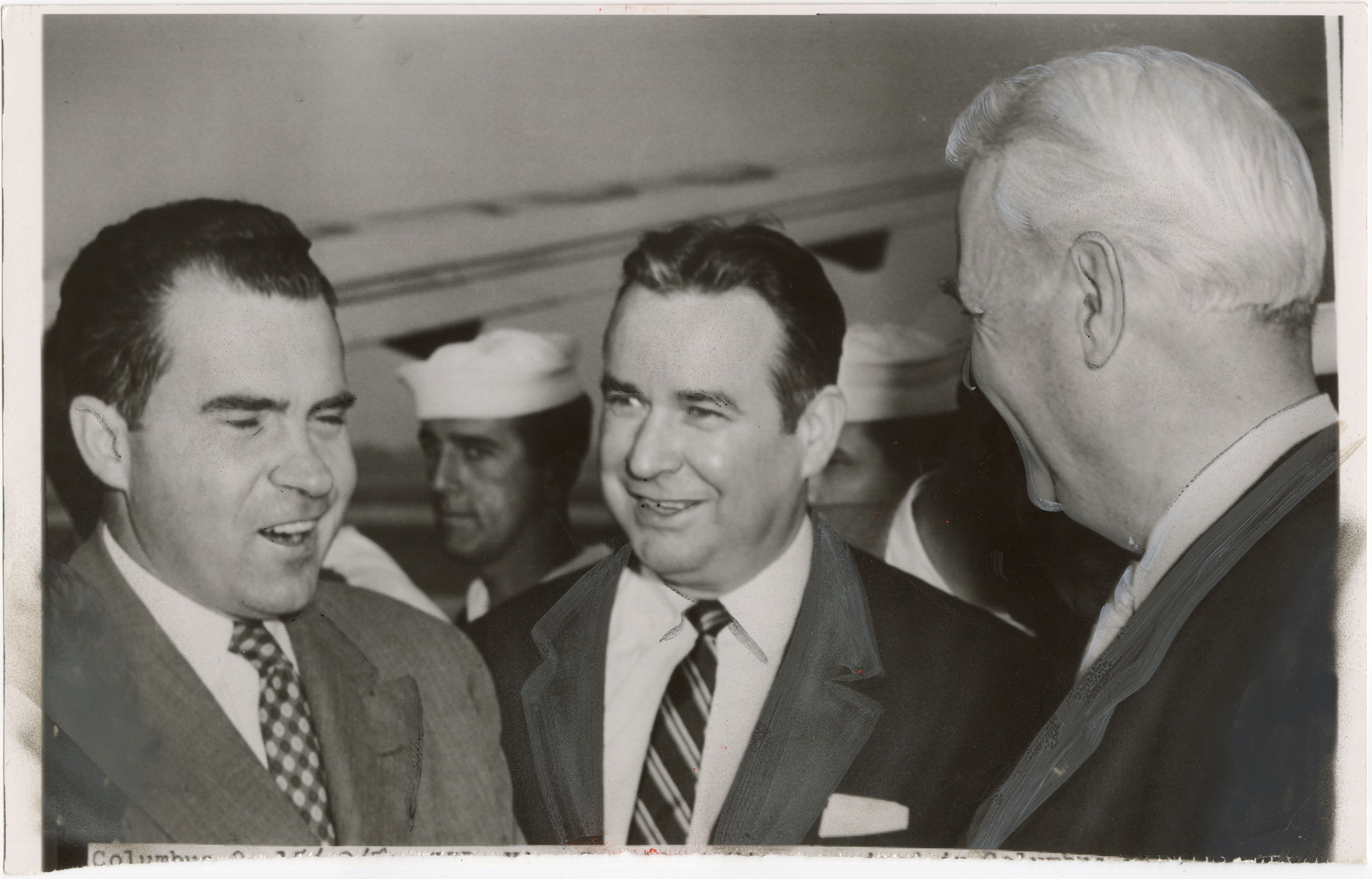
Rhodes (center), serving as state auditor, greeting Vice President Richard Nixon alongside Senator John W. Bricker in 1954 during Rhodes's first gubernatorial campaign.

In 1934, Rhodes began to use his position as a local businessman to climb up the Columbus political ladder, starting on a ward committee. In 1937, Rhodes won his first elected office as a member of the Columbus Board of Education. He was then twice elected as Columbus city auditor in 1939 and 1941. Then in 1943, Rhodes was elected as Mayor of Columbus, becoming the youngest major city mayor in the U.S. at age 34.

Rhodes's time as mayor is primarily marked by two achievements, with the first being his convincing of 67% of Columbus voters to approve the city's first income tax, and the second being the annexation of much of the surrounding suburbs to Columbus. As surrounding communities grew or were constructed, they came to require access to waterlines, which was under the sole control of the municipal water system. Rhodes told these communities that if they wanted water, they would have to submit to assimilation into Columbus. As a result of this, Columbus has the largest land area of any Ohio city.

With an eye on the governorship, Rhodes was elected Ohio State Auditor in 1952 and took office in early 1953. In the 1954 Ohio gubernatorial election, Rhodes ran against popular incumbent Democratic governor Frank Lausche and lost by a 54% to 46% margin.

=== Governor of Ohio (1963–1971, 1975–1983) ===
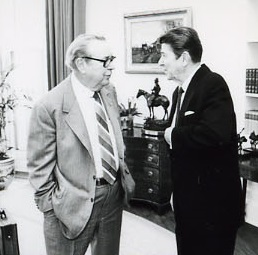
Rhodes with President Ronald Reagan in 1982

Rhodes ran again in the 1962 Ohio gubernatorial election, this time against Democratic incumbent Michael DiSalle. His campaign centered on "jobs and progress", and Rhodes routinely argued that increased employment would reduce problems ranging from crime and divorce to mental illness. He also attacked DiSalle's tax increases, particularly the fuel tax. During the campaign, Rhodes weathered allegations from the Democratic State Chairman that he had diverted and borrowed $54,000 from campaign funds. During a debate, both Rhodes and DiSalle agreed it was "the most vicious campaign [of] the Ohio governorship". Rhodes won the election with 59% of the vote.

Rhodes oversaw the last two pre-Furman v. Georgia executions in Ohio, both by electrocution in early 1963, before the state resumed executions in 1999. He also served as a "favorite son" presidential candidate who controlled the Ohio delegation at the 1964 Republican National Convention and the 1968 Republican National Convention.

In 1965, Rhodes championed a county airport program approved by voters that led to the construction of 50 airports across Ohio. The program provided an initial $100,000 for paved runways of at least 3,500 ft (1,100 m). Rhodes then dedicated many of these airport by flying in to them in a C-53.

In 1970, Rhodes ran for the U.S. Senate and narrowly lost the Republican primary to Representative Robert Taft Jr. two days after the events at Kent State shootings. Rhodes had sent Ohio Army National Guard troops on to the Kent State University campus at the request of Mayor LeRoy Satrom. On May 3, 1970, the day before the shootings, Rhodes stated at a news conference in Kent that campus protesters were "worse than the Brownshirts, and the Communist element, and also the Night Riders, and the vigilantes. They're the worst type of people that we harbor in America." Rhodes retired from the governorship in 1971 after serving two consecutive terms.

Since the Ohio Constitution limits the governor to two four-year terms, when Rhodes initially filed to run again in 1974, his petitions were refused by the Ohio Secretary of State. Rhodes sued, and the Ohio Supreme Court ruled that the limitation applied only to consecutive terms. Rhodes then narrowly defeated incumbent Democratic governor John J. Gilligan in the 1974 Ohio gubernatorial election and returned to office.

During the energy crisis of the winter of 1976–77, Rhodes led a 15-minute service, in which he "beseech[ed] God to relieve the storm." On August 16, 1977, Rhodes was hit in the face and shoulder with a banana cream pie thrown by Steve Conliff, as about 25 young people disrupted the opening of the Ohio State Fair. Conliff then ran unsuccessfully against Rhodes for the Republican nomination. In January 1978, amid a blizzard which dropped 31 inches of snow onto Ohio and killed 60 people in the Northeast, Rhodes called the storm "the greatest disaster in Ohio history."

Rhodes defeated Democratic nominee Dick Celeste in the 1978 Ohio gubernatorial election, securing a fourth term. After relations between the United States and People's Republic of China normalized in 1979, Rhodes sought to encourage economic ties, viewing China as a potential market for Ohio machinery exports for companies like Timken Company and Parker Hannifin. In July 1979, Rhodes led a State of Ohio Trade Mission to China. Among other leaders, Rhodes met with Vice Premier Yu Qiuli. The trip resulted in developing economic ties, a sister state-province relationship with Hubei province, long-running Chinese exhibitions at the Ohio State Fair, and major academic exchanges between Ohio State University and Wuhan University. Rhodes also developed the view that Chinese investment in Ohio would be beneficial for the state.

In 1983, Rhodes pardoned boxing promoter Don King for a 1967 non-negligent manslaughter conviction stemming from the death of one of King's employees. Rhodes retired from office again in 1983 after serving four terms as governor. He sought a record-breaking fifth term in the 1986 Ohio gubernatorial election but lost decisively in a rematch against Governor Dick Celeste, who had succeeded him in 1983.

== Personal life ==
From 1941 to her death in 1987, Rhodes was married to Helen Rawlins. They had three children. Rhodes co-authored stories of historical fiction with Dean Jauchius, including The Trial of Mary Todd Lincoln, The Court-Martial of Oliver Hazard Perry and Johnny Shiloh, a novel of the Civil War. The last was adapted to a 1963 television movie by Walt Disney, also called Johnny Shiloh, for which Rhodes received writer's credit.

In 1995, Rhodes suffered a stroke, resulting in him needing to use a wheelchair. He was hospitalized due to pneumonia in December 2000 and January 2001. On March 4, 2001, Rhodes died of heart issues at the Ohio State University Wexner Medical Center in Columbus. He is interred at Green Lawn Cemetery in Columbus.

== Legacy ==
Numerous buildings and sites around the state have been named in Rhodes's honor, including:

- The Rhodes State Office Tower, the tallest building in Columbus
- Governor James A. Rhodes, a statue in front of his namesake office tower in Columbus
- Ohio State Route 32, also designated the James A. Rhodes Appalachian Highway
- James A. Rhodes State College in Lima, Ohio
- Rhodes Tower, a high-rise building on the campus of Cleveland State University
- Rhodes Hall, the main building of University Hospital at the Ohio State University Wexner Medical Center
- James A. Rhodes Arena (locally nicknamed as "The JAR") at the University of Akron
- James A. Rhodes Athletic Center at Shawnee State University
- Rhodes Center at the Ohio Expo Center and Ohio State Fair in Columbus
- James A. Rhodes Airport in Jackson, Ohio
- James A. Rhodes Conference Center at Transportation Research Center, a mobility research complex that was constructed during Rhodes' governorship

== Electoral history ==
1954 Ohio gubernatorial election
Party	Candidate	Votes	%
Democratic	Frank Lausche (incumbent)	1,405,262	54.10%
Republican	Jim Rhodes	1,192,528	45.91%
Total votes		2,597,790	100.00%

1962 Ohio gubernatorial election
Party	Candidate	Votes	%
Republican	Jim Rhodes	1,836,432	58.92%
Democratic	Michael DiSalle (incumbent)	1,280,521	41.08%
Total votes		3,116,953	100.00%

1966 Ohio gubernatorial election
Party	Candidate	Votes	%
Republican	Jim Rhodes (incumbent)	1,795,277	62.18%
Democratic	Frazier Reams Jr.	1,092,054	37.82%
Total votes		2,887,331	100.00%

1970 Ohio Senate Republican primary
Party	Candidate	Votes	%
Republican	Robert Taft Jr.	472,202	50.28%
Republican	Jim Rhodes	466,932	49.72%
Republican	William L. White (write-in)	18	0.00%
Total votes		939,152	100.00%

1974 Ohio gubernatorial election
Party	Candidate	Votes	%
Republican	Jim Rhodes	1,493,679	48.62%
Democratic	John J. Gilligan (incumbent)	1,482,191	48.25%
Independent	Nancy B. Lazar	95,625	3.11%
Total votes		3,071,495	100.00%

1978 Ohio gubernatorial election
Party	Candidate	Votes	%
Republican	Jim Rhodes (incumbent)	1,402,167	49.31%
Democratic	Dick Celeste	1,354,631	47.64%
Independent	Patricia Wright	35,164	1.24%
Independent	John O'Neill	29,413	1.03%
Independent	Allan Friedman	21,951	0.77%
Total votes		2,843,326	100.00%

1986 Ohio gubernatorial election
Party	Candidate	Votes	%
Democratic	Dick Celeste (incumbent)	1,858,372	60.60%
Republican	Jim Rhodes	1,207,264	39.40%
Independent	Write-ins	975	0.1%
Total votes		3,065,636	100.00%

== Notes ==
Political offices
Preceded by Floyd F. Green	Mayor of Columbus; 1944–1952	Succeeded by Robert T. Oestreicher
Preceded by Michael DiSalle	Governor of Ohio; 1963–1971	Succeeded by John J. Gilligan
Preceded by John J. Gilligan	Governor of Ohio; 1975–1983	Succeeded by Dick Celeste
Legal offices
Preceded by Joseph T. Ferguson	Ohio State Auditor; 1953–1963	Succeeded by Roger W. Tracy Jr.
Party political offices
Preceded by Roger W. Tracy	Republican nominee for Ohio State Auditor; 1952, 1956, 1960	Succeeded by Roger W. Tracy
Preceded by Charles Phelps Taft II	Republican Party nominee for Governor of Ohio; 1954	Succeeded by C. William O'Neill
Preceded by C. William O'Neill	Republican Party nominee for Governor of Ohio; 1962, 1966	Succeeded by Roger Cloud
Preceded by Roger Cloud	Republican Party nominee for Governor of Ohio; 1974, 1978	Succeeded by Bud Brown
Preceded by Bud Brown	Republican Party nominee for Governor of Ohio; 1986	Succeeded by George Voinovich
