= 1972 New Hampshire gubernatorial election =

- November 7, 1972
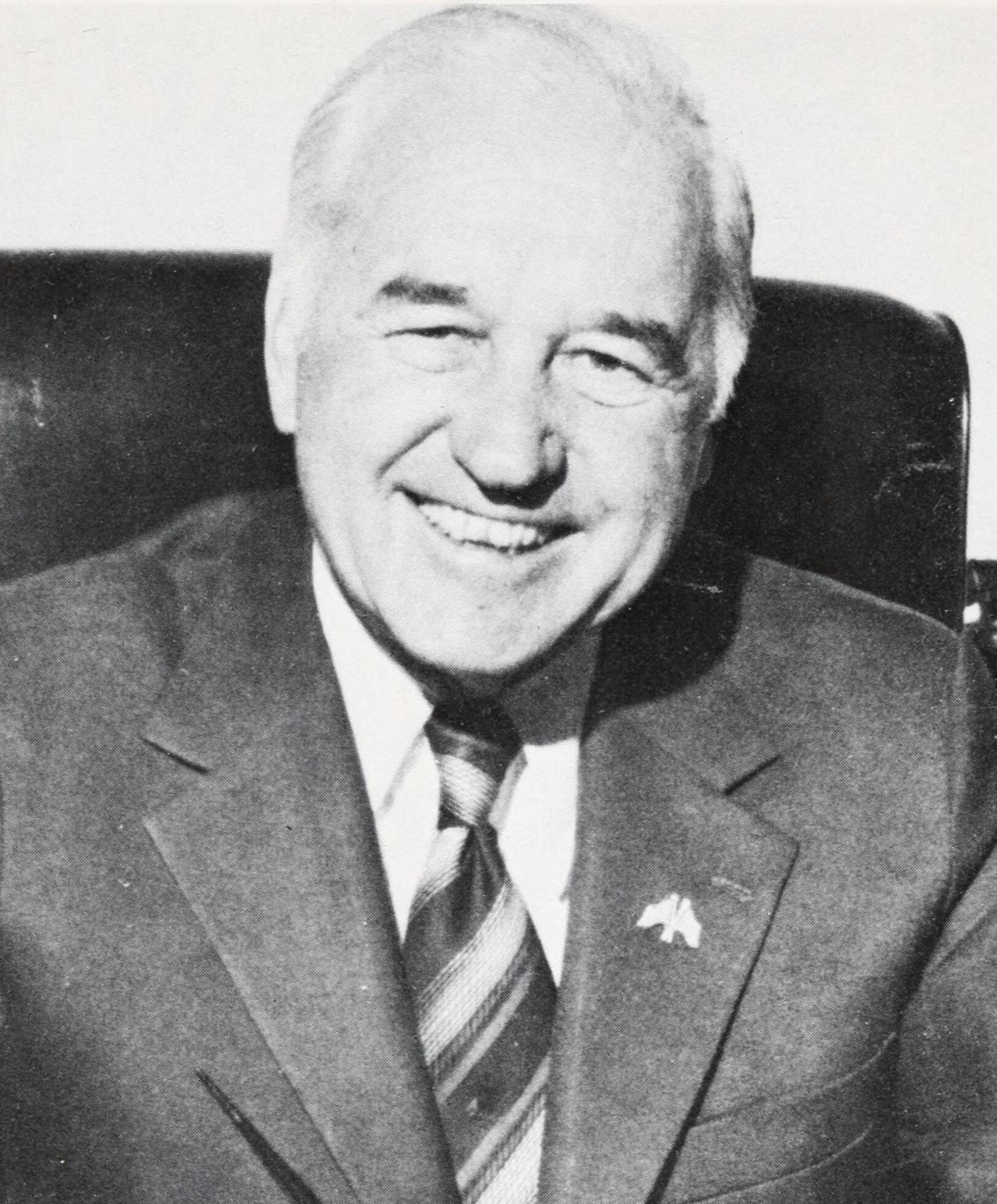

Nominee	Meldrim Thomson	Roger J. Crowley	Malcolm McLane
Party	Republican	Democratic	Independent
Popular vote	133,702	126,107	63,199
Percentage	41.38%	39.03%	19.56%
- Thomson: 30–40% 40–50% 50–60% 60–70% 70–80% 80–90% >90% Crowley: 30–40% 40–50% 50–60% 60–70% >90% McLane: 30–40% 40–50% 50–60% 60–70% 70–80% 80–90% No data/vote
Governor before election
Walter R. Peterson Jr.
Republican
Elected Governor
Meldrim Thomson Jr.
Republican

The 1972 New Hampshire gubernatorial election was held on November 7, 1972.

Incumbent Republican Governor Walter R. Peterson Jr. was defeated for renomination in the Republican primary.

Republican nominee Meldrim Thomson Jr. defeated Democratic nominee Roger J. Crowley with 41.38% of the vote.

== Primary elections ==
Primary elections were held on September 12, 1972.

=== Democratic primary ===
==== Candidates ====
- Carmen C. Chimento
- Roger J. Crowley, Democratic nominee for governor in 1970
- Robert E. Raiche, state representative

==== Results ====
Democratic primary results
Party	Candidate	Votes	%
Democratic	Roger J. Crowley	29,326	61.37
Democratic	Robert E. Raiche	16,216	33.94
Democratic	Write-ins	1,298	2.72
Democratic	Carmen C. Chimento	943	1.97
Total votes		47,783	100.00

=== Republican primary ===
==== Candidates ====
- Elmer E. Bussey, perennial candidate
- Lucien R. Doucet
- James Koromilas, state senator
- Walter R. Peterson Jr., incumbent governor
- Meldrim Thomson Jr., American Independent Party candidate for governor in 1970

==== Results ====
Republican primary results
Party	Candidate	Votes	%
Republican	Meldrim Thomson Jr.	43,611	47.89
Republican	Walter R. Peterson Jr. (incumbent)	41,252	45.30
Republican	James Koromilas	3,975	4.37
Republican	Elmer E. Bussey	852	0.94
Republican	Write-ins	831	0.91
Republican	Lucien R. Doucet	538	0.59
Total votes		91,059	100.00

== General election ==
=== Candidates ===
- Robert J. Crowley, Democratic
- Malcolm McLane, Independent, mayor of Concord
- Meldrim Thomson Jr., Republican

=== Results ===
1972 New Hampshire gubernatorial election
Party	Candidate	Votes	%	±%
Republican	Meldrim Thomson Jr.	133,702	41.38%	
Democratic	Robert J. Crowley	126,107	39.03%	
Independent	Malcolm McLane	63,199	19.56%	
Write-in	Scattering	94	0.32%	
Majority		7,595	2.35%	
Turnout		323,102	100.00%	
Republican hold		Swing		

== Bibliography ==
- Gubernatorial Elections, 1787-1997. Washington, D.C.: Congressional Quarterly Inc. 1998. ISBN 1-56802-396-0.
- Stark, Robert L., ed. (1973). Manual for the General Court of New Hampshire. Vol. 43. Concord, NH: Department of State, New Hampshire.
- Scammon, Richard M., ed. (1973). America Votes 10: a handbook of contemporary American election statistics, 1972. Washington, D.C.: Governmental Affairs Institute.
