= Old New Hampshire =

Regional anthem of New Hampshire

- Regional anthem of New Hampshire
- Lyrics: John F. Holmes, 1926
- Music: Maurice Hoffman, 1926
- Adopted: 1949; 77 years ago
- Readopted: November 1977; 48 years ago

"Old New Hampshire" is the regional anthem (or state song) of the U.S. state of New Hampshire. The words were written by Dr. John F. Holmes and the music was composed by Maurice Hoffman in 1926. The song was designated as the official state song in 1949 and again in November 1977 by the State Song Selection Board. New Hampshire has nine honorary state songs and no other official state song.

== History ==
In 1926, Dr. John F. Holmes of Manchester wrote the song's lyrics, and Maurice Hoffman Jr., organist at the Franklin Street Congregational Church in Manchester, composed the music. The New Hampshire General Court voted against adopting the song as the state song in 1941, and in 1943 rejected a proposal to hold a public contest to select a state song. In 1949, the General Court voted in favor of designating "Old New Hampshire" as the state song.

In 1963, the legislature approved "New Hampshire, My New Hampshire", by Julius Richelson and Walter P. Smith of Plymouth, as the Second State Song. In 1973, "New Hampshire Hills", with lyrics by state poet laureate Paul Scott Mowrer and music by Tom Powers, was designated as the Third State Song.

In March 1977, "Autumn in New Hampshire", written and composed by Leo Austin of Warner, was designated as the Fourth State Song. This coincided with the creation of an interim State Song Selection Board to recommend one official state song and classify the remaining songs as honorary.

In June 1977, the General Court enacted legislation adding four additional state songs, to become honorary if none were selected as official. These were "New Hampshire's Granite State" by Annie B. Currier, "Oh, New Hampshire (You're My Home)" by Brownie Macintosh, "The Old Man of the Mountain" by Paul Belanger, and "The New Hampshire State March" by Rene Richards.

The State Song Selection Board announced its decision on November 29, 1977, in Representatives Hall. The selection was drawn by New Hampshire First Lady Gale Thomson, wife of Governor Meldrim Thomson Jr., from a sealed envelope prepared by the board.

In 1983, "New Hampshire Naturally", with words and music by Rick and Ron Shaw, was added to the list of honorary state songs under RSA 3:7.

== Lyrics ==
With a skill that knows no measure,
From the golden store of fate,
God, in his great love and wisdom,
Made the rugged Granite State;
Made the lakes, the fields, the forests;
Made the rivers and the rills;
Made the bubbling, crystal fountains
Of New Hampshire's Granite Hills.

Refrain
Old New Hampshire, Old New Hampshire
Old New Hampshire Grand and Great
We will sing of Old New Hampshire,
Of the dear old Granite State.

Builded he New Hampshire glorious
From the borders to the sea;
And with matchless charm and splendor
Blessed her for eternity.
Hers, the majesty of mountain;
Hers, the grandeur of the lake;
Hers, the truth as from the hillside
Where her crystal waters break.

Refrain

== Honorary state songs ==
- "New Hampshire, My New Hampshire" by Julius Richelson and Walter P. Smith.
- "New Hampshire Hills" by Paul Scott Mowrer and Tom Powers.
- "Autumn in New Hampshire" by Leo Austin.
- "New Hampshire's Granite State" by Annie B. Currier.
- "Oh, New Hampshire (You're My Home)" by Brownie Macintosh.
- "The Old Man of the Mountain" by Paul Belanger.
- "The New Hampshire State March" by Rene Richards.
- "New Hampshire Naturally" by Rick and Ron Shaw.
- "Live Free or Die" by Barry Palmer.
