= Acting governor =

Person temporarily filling the post

An acting governor is a person who acts in the role of governor. In Commonwealth jurisdictions where the governor is a vice-regal position, the role of "acting governor" may be filled by a lieutenant governor (as in most Australian states) or an administrator.

In some U.S. states, it is a constitutional position created when the governor dies in office or resigns. In other states, the governor may also be declared to be incapacitated and unable to function for various reasons including illness and absence from the state for more than a specified period.

In these instances, the state constitution will declare which official is to serve as governor and whether this person will have all of the powers of the office or only specified ones. In many states, the person succeeding to the governorship or becoming acting governor is the lieutenant governor; however, not all states have such a position. If the state constitution provides for an acting governor in the event of the governor's disability, it will also provide for a method by which the governor can be declared to be no longer disabled.

== Examples of acting governors ==
=== Alabama ===
George C. Wallace was shot in an assassination attempt in May 1972. With him out of state recovering for more than 120 days, Lt. Governor Jere Beasley acted as governor from June 5 to July 7, 1972, at which time Governor Wallace returned to the state and returned to office.

=== Massachusetts ===
In Massachusetts, in the event of a vacancy in the governor's office, the lieutenant governor assumes the duties of the office, but not the office for the remainder of the term, thus becoming acting governor while retaining the lieutenant governor's office. In 1997, when William Weld resigned to pursue the ambassadorship to Mexico, Paul Cellucci took over as acting governor until after his 1998 election as governor, when he assumed office in January 1999. In 2001, when Cellucci resigned to become United States Ambassador to Canada, Jane Swift became the acting governor until January 2003, when Cellucci's term ended with the inauguration of Mitt Romney.

=== New Jersey ===
In New Jersey, a state which has a lieutenant governor, in the event of a vacancy in the office of governor, the lieutenant governor becomes governor. In case of the inability of the current governor to fulfill the gubernatorial duties through injury, the lieutenant governor serves as the acting governor. The acting governor performs powers and duties until the governor recovers from the injuries. If the governor's death or resignation occurs less than 16 months before end of the term, the new governor serves until the end of the term, otherwise a special election (in which the new governor may participate) is held.

Prior to the establishment of the modern office of lieutenant governor following a constitutional referendum in 2005 that took effect in 2009, a vacancy in the office of governor would lead to the president of the state Senate to become acting governor while still retaining the title of senate president. Following the resignation of Christine Todd Whitman in 2001 to become EPA Administrator, Donald DiFrancesco assumed the acting governor's post, serving until January 2002. Following DiFrancesco's departure from the senate, John O. Bennett and Richard J. Codey each served as acting governor as well. As control of the New Jersey Senate was evenly split, resulting in two Senate co-presidents, Codey and Bennett each held the office of acting governor for three days in January 2002, until Jim McGreevey began his term as governor. Codey again served as acting governor following McGreevey's own resignation, serving from November 2004 until January 2006, when Jon Corzine took office as governor. These unusual events were a major factor in voters' decision to amend the state constitution to create the office of lieutenant governor in the 2005 referendum, effective with the 2009 election. Before the amendment could take effect, state transportation commissioner Kris Kolluri served as acting governor the day of December 28, 2006. As Governor Corzine, the senate president, assembly speaker, and attorney general were all out of state, Kolluri became acting governor.

=== West Virginia ===
In West Virginia, if the governorship becomes vacant, the Senate president acts as governor. If more than one year remains in the governor's term at the time of vacancy, a special election is held; otherwise, the Senate president serves the remainder of the term. A bill passed in 2000 grants the Senate president the honorary title of lieutenant governor, but this title is rarely used in practice and the terms of the Senate president do not correspond with governorships. Then-Senate president Earl Ray Tomblin is the first person under the current state constitution to act as governor following the November 15, 2010 resignation of Joe Manchin following his election to the United States Senate seat vacated by the death of Robert Byrd. As there was more than one year remaining on Manchin's term as governor, a special election was held, which Tomblin won. He became governor on November 13, 2011 to complete the term.

== Disputes over powers of acting governors ==
The powers of an acting governor came into dispute during the 1980 Democratic primary presidential campaign of Jerry Brown, then governor of California. When he was campaigning out of state, which was often in late 1979 and early 1980, Mike Curb, a Republican who was then serving as lieutenant governor of California often used his position as acting governor to veto legislation, promulgate executive orders, issue proclamations, appoint Republican appellate court justices, and to do other things that Brown would not likely have done had he been present in the state. This eventually resulted in litigation, much of which went in Curb's favor.

Powers of an acting governor had previously been questioned in the mid-1970s in Kentucky. In her capacity as acting governor of Kentucky in Julian Carroll's absence, Thelma Stovall, then-lieutenant governor, acting as governor, issued pardons, called the Kentucky General Assembly into special session to enact legislation limiting property tax increases, and purported to veto the legislature's repeal of its ratification of the Equal Rights Amendment. The authority of the lieutenant governor of Kentucky to act as governor when the elected governor is out of state was repealed under a 1992 amendment to the Kentucky Constitution.

In 1993, in Pennsylvania, Governor Robert P. Casey underwent surgery that left him incapacitated for months, thus leaving Lieutenant Governor Mark Singel as acting governor. During that time, Singel fulfilled all duties of the office of governor.

Following the death of New Hampshire Governor Hugh Gallen, Vesta M. Roy, as president of the state Senate, served as acting governor of New Hampshire from December 30, 1982, to January 6, 1983.

Practices in this area are anything but uniform from state to state. In Rhode Island, for example, the lieutenant governor never acts as governor, even if the governor has left the state. In most of the states, when the governor dies, resigns or is removed from office (via impeachment conviction), the next in line become the new governor, succeeding to the office and powers.

== See also ==
- Acting President of the United States
- Acting (law)
