= Governor Peterson =

Governor Peterson may refer to:

- Russell W. Peterson (1916–2011), 66th Governor of Delaware
- Val Peterson (1903–1983), 26th Governor of Nebraska
- Walter R. Peterson Jr. (1922–2011), 72nd Governor of New Hampshire

== See also ==
- Hjalmar Petersen (1890–1968), 23rd Governor of Minnesota
