= 1968 New Hampshire gubernatorial election =

- November 5, 1968
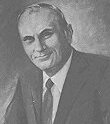

Nominee	Walter R. Peterson Jr.	Emile R. Bussiere
Party	Republican	Democratic
Popular vote	149,902	135,378
Percentage	52.53%	47.44%
- Peterson: 50–60% 60–70% 70–80% 80–90% >90% Bussiere: 50–60% 60–70% 70–80% 80–90% Tie: 50%
Governor before election
John W. King
Democratic
Elected Governor
Walter R. Peterson Jr.
Republican

The 1968 New Hampshire gubernatorial election was held on November 5, 1968.

Incumbent Democratic Governor John W. King retired to run for the U.S. Senate.

Republican nominee Walter R. Peterson Jr. defeated Democratic nominee Emile R. Bussiere with 52.53% of the vote.

== Primary elections ==
Primary elections were held on September 10, 1968.

=== Democratic primary ===
==== Candidates ====
- Emile R. Bussiere, State's attorney for Hillsborough County
- Vincent P. Dunn, New Hampshire Bank Commissioner
- Austin F. Quinney, former member of the Executive Council
- John D. Shea, former State Representative
- Henry P. Sullivan, State Senator

==== Results ====
Democratic primary results
Party	Candidate	Votes	%
Democratic	Emile R. Bussiere	12,021	32.69
Democratic	Henry P. Sullivan	10,895	29.63
Democratic	Vincent P. Dunn	10,412	28.31
Democratic	John D. Shea	1,338	3.64
Democratic	Write-ins	1,176	3.20
Democratic	Austin F. Quinney	934	2.54
Total votes		36,776	100.00

=== Republican primary ===
==== Candidates ====
- Elmer E. Bussey, perennial candidate
- Edward H. Cullen, member of the Executive Council
- Fred Fletcher, member of the Executive Council
- Stuart Hancock, former State Representative
- Walter R. Peterson Jr., Speaker of the New Hampshire House of Representatives
- Wesley Powell, former Governor
- Meldrim Thomson Jr., publisher

==== Results ====
Republican primary results
Party	Candidate	Votes	%
Republican	Walter R. Peterson Jr.	29,262	34.12
Republican	Wesley Powell	26,498	30.89
Republican	Meldrim Thomson Jr.	25,275	29.47
Republican	Fred Fletcher	2,826	3.30
Republican	Edward H. Cullen	1,068	1.25
Republican	Stuart Hancock	424	0.49
Republican	Elmer E. Bussey	257	0.30
Republican	Write-ins	162	0.19
Total votes		85,772	100.00

== General election ==
=== Candidates ===
- Emile R. Bussiere, Democratic
- Walter R. Peterson Jr., Republican

=== Results ===
1968 New Hampshire gubernatorial election
Party	Candidate	Votes	%	±%
Republican	Walter R. Peterson Jr.	149,902	52.53%	
Democratic	Emile R. Bussiere	135,378	47.44%	
Write-in	Scattering	62	0.02%	
Majority		14,524	5.09%	
Turnout		285,342	100.00%	
Republican gain from Democratic		Swing		

== Bibliography ==
- Gubernatorial Elections, 1787-1997. Washington, D.C.: Congressional Quarterly Inc. 1998. ISBN 1-56802-396-0.
- Stark, Robert L., ed. (1969). Manual for the General Court of New Hampshire. Vol. 41. Concord, NH: Department of State, New Hampshire.
- Scammon, Richard M., ed. (1970). America Votes 8: a handbook of contemporary American election statistics, 1968. Washington, D.C.: Governmental Affairs Institute.
