= Gale Thomson =

First Lady of New Hampshire
- In role January 4, 1973 – January 4, 1979
- Governor: Meldrim Thomson Jr.
- Preceded by: Dorothy Peterson
- Succeeded by: Irene Gallen

Personal details
- Born: May 17, 1919 Brooklyn, New York, U.S.
- Died: March 8, 2010 (aged 90) Orford, New Hampshire, U.S.
- Party: Republican
- Spouse: Meldrim Thomson Jr. (m. 1938; died 2001)
- Children: 6

Anne Gale Kelly Thomson (17 May 1919 – March 8, 2010) was an American public and political figure, anti-tax activist, businesswoman, and benefactor. Thomson served as the First Lady of New Hampshire from 1973 until 1979 during the tenure of former Governor Meldrim Thomson, Jr.

== Early and personal life ==
Thomson was born Anne Gale Kelly in Brooklyn, New York, in 1919. She was the oldest child of parents William and Anne Kelly. She graduated from high school two years early and took a position with the Edward Thompson Law Book Company, a law publishing company in Brooklyn.

Kelly met her future husband, Meldrim Thomson, Jr., while she was working as a secretary at the Edward Thompson Law Book Company. The couple married in 1938 and had six children during their marriage – Peter, David, Thomas, Marion, Janet, and Robb. The family initially resided in Brooklyn and Stony Brook, New York.

In 1954, Thomson and her husband decided not to raise their family in New York City. They moved with their six children to the Mt. Cube Farm, a 19th-century farmhouse in Orford, New Hampshire, in the fall of 1954, where Thomson and her husband lived for the rest of her life. As Mel Thomson's book editing company, Equity Publishing, grew, Gale Thomson largely ran the day-to-day operations of the farm and family.

== Political and business career ==
Thomson became the First Lady of New Hampshire in 1973 when her husband took office. She was known to entertain guests with pancakes served with maple syrup collected at her Mt. Cube Farm in Orford. Gale Thomson (and her husband) used the breakfasts as a way to network and lobby legislators and businesspeople on behalf of her husband's political goals. She notably lobbied Greek magnate Aristotle Onassis, who had announced plans to construct an oil refinery in New Hampshire, reportedly winning him over with a bottle of Blue Nun, an inexpensive wine.

Thomson remained First Lady until they moved out of Bridges House at the end of his tenure in 1979 after three consecutive terms.

Gale Thomson remained a vocal supporter of Mel Thomson's policies, especially after his death in 2001. She was strong proponent of the former governor's tax policies, including "The Pledge," in which he had promised to veto any state income tax or sales tax. Thomson also defended her late husband against charges of racism, including in a 2001 profile published in The "New Hampshire Century: "Concord Monitor" Profiles of One Hundred People Who Shaped It." The former Governor had visited South Africa under apartheid rule, after leaving office and had come under fire for referring to the late Martin Luther King Jr. as a person "of immoral character" and a "leading agent of Communism." Gale Thomson dismissed the accusations of racism against her husband, noting that he had appointed Ivorey Cobb, the first African American judge in New Hampshire state history.

The former First Lady published op-eds and other opinion pieces in the New Hampshire Union Leader.

In 2000, Thomson, a prominent state political figure and activist, expressed concern that New Hampshire residents were beginning to ignore their responsibilities as the first state to hold a presidential primary. She told the Hartford Courant, "People are apathetic.... The working people here, for the most part, don't get too involved in the primary – they're a little bored with it.... I was born the year that women were first given the chance to vote. It's not to be squandered."

In 2005, Gale Thomson, her son, Tom Thomson, and other homeowners drew international attention when their homes were levied with a so-called local "view tax" in Orford, New Hampshire. Gale Thomson's home, where she had lived at Mt. Cube Farm since 1954, was appraised with a new $100,000 tax assessment based on the panoramic view from the house. Gale Thomson joined with other property owners, including David Bischoff, to form the "Axe the View Tax" campaign to challenge the proposed "view factor" tax. Thomson told a British newspaper, The Daily Telegraph, "My husband would have been furious. He'd have supported these boys all the way."

Thomson ran a maple syrup business based out of her Mt. Cube Farm in Orford.

=== Public and private sector philanthropy ===
She served as a trustee of the Youth Development Center, the Robert Frost Farm in Derry, and the Vermont-New Hampshire Visiting Nurse Alliance. She was also an appointed member of the Governor's Lilac and Wildflower Commission, which was established by Governor John H. Sununu in 1984.

=== 2008 presidential campaign ===
In December 2007, Thomson endorsed former Massachusetts Governor Mitt Romney for U.S. President during the 2008 Republican presidential primaries. Romney and his campaign touted Gale Thomson's endorsement saying, "I am honored to have the endorsement of Gale Thomson, one of New Hampshire's most respected leaders. She and her husband faithfully served the people of the Granite State and worked to bring fiscally responsible policies to the State Capitol. I look forward to working with her to bring conservative change to Washington." Romney had previously traveled to Thomson's home to meet with her on February 1, 2007, to seek her endorsement.

=== Death and honors ===
Gale Thomson died of congestive heart failure at her home at the Mt. Cube family farm in Orford, New Hampshire, on March 8, 2010, at the age of 90. March 8 – on what would have been her husband's 98th birthday. She was survived by her six children, eighteen grandchildren and twenty-eight great-grandchildren. New Hampshire Governor John Lynch ordered all state flags lowered to half-staff in her honor. Her funeral was held at the Baker River Bible Church in Wentworth, New Hampshire, on March 13, 2010.

Honorary titles
Preceded by Dorothy Peterson	First Lady of New Hampshire; 1973–1979	Succeeded by Irene Gallen
