= 1974 New Hampshire gubernatorial election =

- November 5, 1974
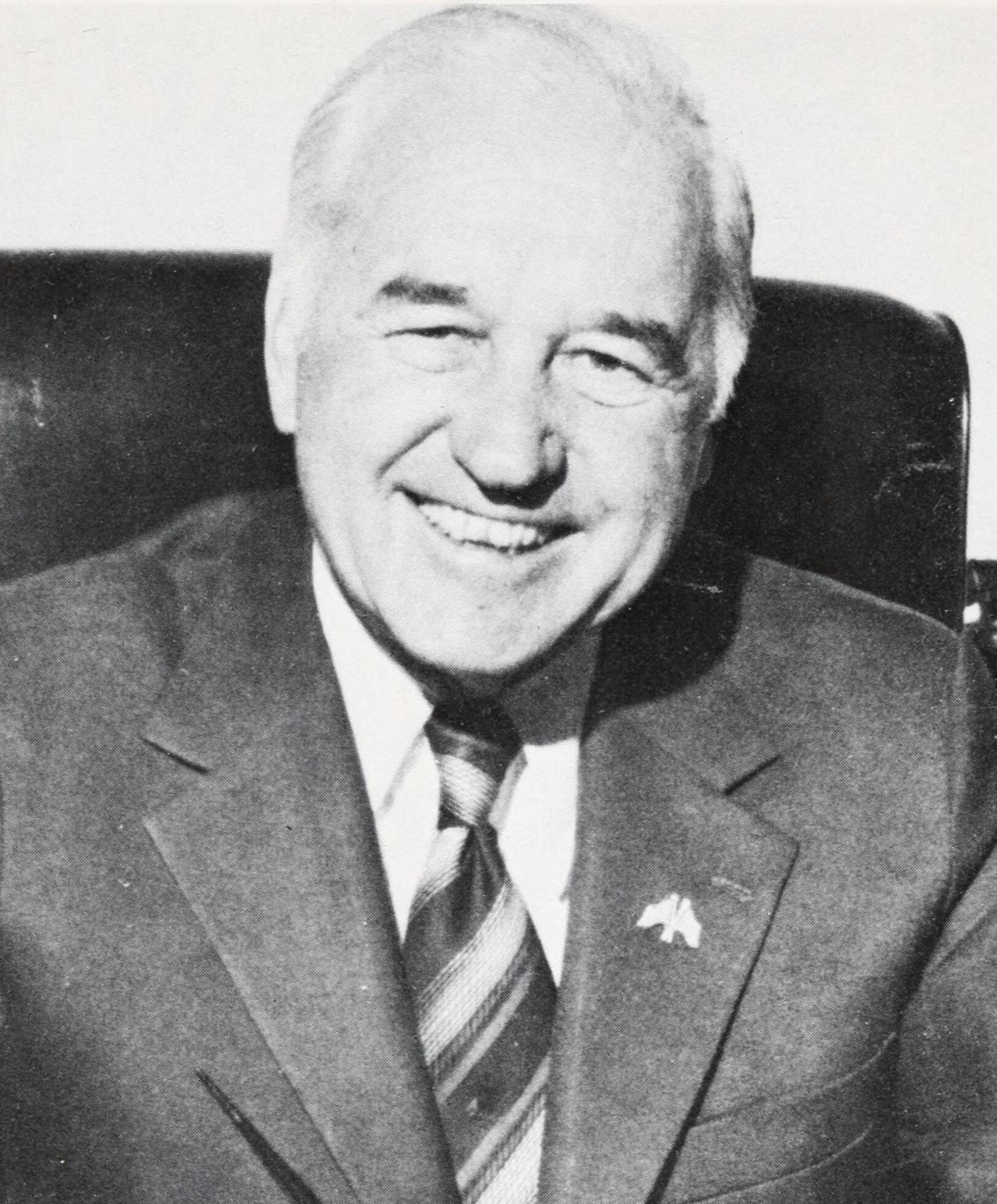

Nominee	Meldrim Thomson	Richard W. Leonard
Party	Republican	Democratic
Popular vote	115,933	110,591
Percentage	51.15%	48.79%
- Thomson: 40–50% 50–60% 60–70% 70–80% 80–90% >90% Leonard: 50–60% 60–70% 70–80% 80–90% No data/vote
Governor before election
Meldrim Thomson Jr.
Republican
Elected Governor
Meldrim Thomson Jr.
Republican

The 1974 New Hampshire gubernatorial election was held on November 5, 1974. Incumbent Republican Governor Meldrim Thomson Jr. defeated Democratic nominee Richard W. Leonard with 51.15% of the vote.

== Primary elections ==
Primary elections were held on September 10, 1974.

=== Democratic primary ===
==== Candidates ====
- Hugh J. Gallen, state representative
- Richard W. Leonard, former Air Force pilot and state legislator
- Harry V. Spanos, state senator

==== Results ====
Democratic primary results
Party	Candidate	Votes	%
Democratic	Richard W. Leonard	16,503	36.55
Democratic	Harry V. Spanos	14,149	31.34
Democratic	Hugh J. Gallen	13,030	28.86
Democratic	Write-ins	1,467	3.25
Total votes		45,147	100.00

=== Republican primary ===
==== Candidates ====
- Ralph Brewster
- Elmer E. Bussey, perennial candidate
- David L. Nixon, state senator
- Meldrim Thomson Jr., incumbent governor

==== Results ====
Republican primary results
Party	Candidate	Votes	%
Republican	Meldrim Thomson Jr. (incumbent)	47,244	54.73
Republican	Gerald J. Zeiller	37,286	43.20
Republican	Ralph W. Brewster	841	0.97
Republican	Elmer E. Bussey	682	0.79
Republican	Write-ins	267	0.31
Total votes		86,320	100.00

== General election ==
=== Candidates ===
- Richard W. Leonard, Democratic
- Meldrim Thomson, Republican

=== Results ===
1974 New Hampshire gubernatorial election
Party	Candidate	Votes	%	±%
Republican	Meldrim Thomson Jr. (incumbent)	115,933	51.15%	
Democratic	Richard W. Leonard	110,591	48.79%	
Write-in	Scattering	141	0.06%	
Majority		5,342	2.36%	
Turnout		226,665	100.00%	
Republican hold		Swing		

== Bibliography ==
- Gubernatorial Elections, 1787-1997. Washington, D.C.: Congressional Quarterly Inc. 1998. ISBN 1-56802-396-0.
- Stark, Robert L., ed. (1975). Manual for the General Court of New Hampshire. Vol. 44. Concord, NH: Department of State, New Hampshire.
- Scammon, Richard M., ed. (1975). America Votes 11: a handbook of contemporary American election statistics, 1974. Washington, D.C.: Elections Research Center.
