= Vesta M. Roy =

American politician (1925–2002)

Vesta Roy
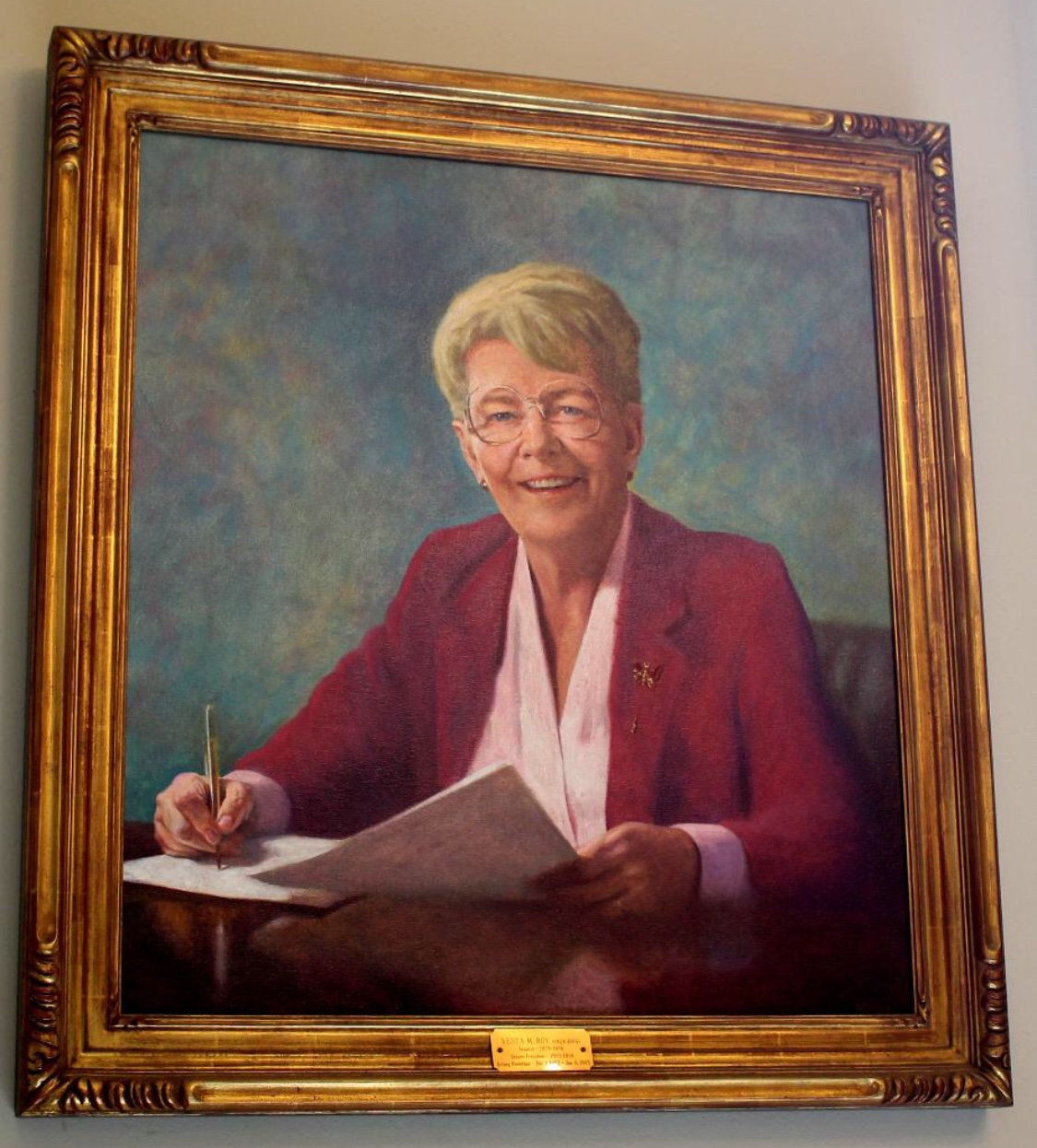
- Roy's oil portrait in the New Hampshire Statehouse, the first portrait of a woman to be hung there.

Acting Governor of New Hampshire
- In office December 29, 1982 – January 6, 1983
- Preceded by: Hugh Gallen
- Succeeded by: John H. Sununu

President of the New Hampshire Senate
- In office 1982–1986
- Preceded by: Robert B. Monier
- Succeeded by: William S. Bartlett Jr.

Member of the New Hampshire Senate from the 22nd district
- In office 1978–1986
- Preceded by: Delbert F. Downing
- Succeeded by: Joseph Delahunty

Member of the Rockingham County Commission from the 3rd district
- In office 1974–1976
- Preceded by: Russell J. Hall
- Succeeded by: Ernest P. Barka

Personal details
- Born: March 26, 1925 Detroit, Michigan, U.S.
- Died: February 9, 2002 (aged 76) Kenmore, New York, U.S.
- Party: Republican
- Spouse: Dr. Albert Roy
- Education: Wayne State University (BA)

Vesta M. Roy (née Coward; March 26, 1925 – February 9, 2002) was an American Republican politician. She was the first woman to ever serve as the president of the New Hampshire Senate, acting governor, and governor of New Hampshire. Her brief time as governor was a complicated state constitutional set of events that unfolded when the sitting, post-election, outgoing governor fell ill and died just prior to the end of his term in January 1983.

== Early life ==
Vesta Maurine (Coward) Roy was born in Detroit, Michigan on March 26, 1925. She spent her youth in Dearborn, Michigan during The Great Depression. She was her mother's only daughter with three brothers, and her father was a production foreman at Dearborn's Ford Motor Company main production plant. At 16, Vesta was a member of a regionally well-known girls' Swing Jazz Singing Group named The Six Sunbeams.

Roy attempted to join the US armed forces during World War II, but was rejected as too young. Roy then walked across the International Bridge from Detroit over the Canadian border to Windsor, Ontario and enlisted in the Royal Canadian Air Force from 1943 to 1945 during World War II, where she was named a Leading Air Woman.

== Career ==
A year after the end of World War II, in 1946, 21-year-old Vesta Coward married 22-year-old US Navy "Battle of the Atlantic" combat veteran Albert Roy, moved to his hometown of Lowell, Massachusetts, and then joined The Prudential Insurance Company as a Special Sales Agent. The Roys had five children, and Vesta went on to help build and run Albert's optometry practice for 30 years in Salem, New Hampshire.

Roy began her political career late at the ground level as the Salem, NH Supervisor Of The Checklist and then as a Town Selectman in 1968. Roy then became a Republican member of the New Hampshire House of Representatives from 1972 to 1974. It was there that Roy began to learn the state ropes and etch her statewide reputation as a respected leader among her colleagues and her constituents.

In 1974, Roy became the first woman to serve as a Rockingham County, New Hampshire Commissioner, cementing her New Hampshire political career. Roy then served as Salem's State Senator from District 22 from 1978 to 1986.

Roy made major New Hampshire history in December 1982 when the newly-elected New Hampshire State Senate convened to elect Roy as their anointed President of the New Hampshire Senate (and thus also the Lt. Governor), becoming the first woman in New Hampshire's then-198-year history to hold the office.

When outgoing Democratic Governor Hugh Gallen then became gravely ill and incapacitated just after his November 1982 re-election loss to John H. Sununu, new Lieutenant Governor Vesta Roy was automatically tasked with the New Hampshire Constitution duties of Acting Governor. Gallen died on December 29, 1982, complicating gubernatorial succession and elevating Roy to full-on Governor of the state for the eight days remaining until the inauguration of incoming Governor-elect John H. Sununu to Governor.

As the result of this complicated set of events, Vesta Roy was legally - according to The New Hampshire Constitution - the first Republican woman Governor in American history.

Roy didn't take the formal oath of office to become full-on Governor (she didn't have to). If she did so, she'd be required to give up her Senate seat and thus the Senate Presidency once John Sununu was sworn in. So by automatic succession upon Governor Gallen's death, Lt. Governor/Senate President Roy was fully and instantly the Governor - even without the oath. Governor-elect John H. Sununu was sworn in on January 6, 1983, ending Roy's brief term as full-on Governor.

Roy was named 1983 New Hampshire Woman of the Year. She was a New Hampshire GOP National Convention Delegate multiple times as well as an adviser to the New Hampshire campaigns of Republican presidential candidates Gerald Ford and Ronald Reagan, and served as Campaign Chair for George H. W. Bush in the 1980 New Hampshire Primary.

In 1986, as Governor John Sununu finished his second term and announced he would not seek a third term, it was a foregone conclusion among New Hampshire politicos that Vesta Roy would then be the odds-on favorite to run as the 1986 New Hampshire GOP gubernatorial nominee, be easily elected due to her statewide popularity, and succeed Sununu as the sworn in Governor in 1987. Sununu went on to be George H. W. Bush's White House Chief of Staff in 1989, and in 1986, instead of running for Governor, Roy and her husband retired.

== Personal life and death ==
Vesta Roy died on February 9, 2002, at her home in Kenmore, New York, at the age of 76. She is buried next her husband Albert in the Roy Family plot at Saint Joseph's Cemetery in East Chelmsford, Massachusetts.

== See also ==
- List of female governors in the United States

Political offices
Preceded by Hugh Gallen	Acting Governor of New Hampshire; 1982–1983	Succeeded by John Sununu
