= 1976 New Hampshire gubernatorial election =

- November 2, 1976
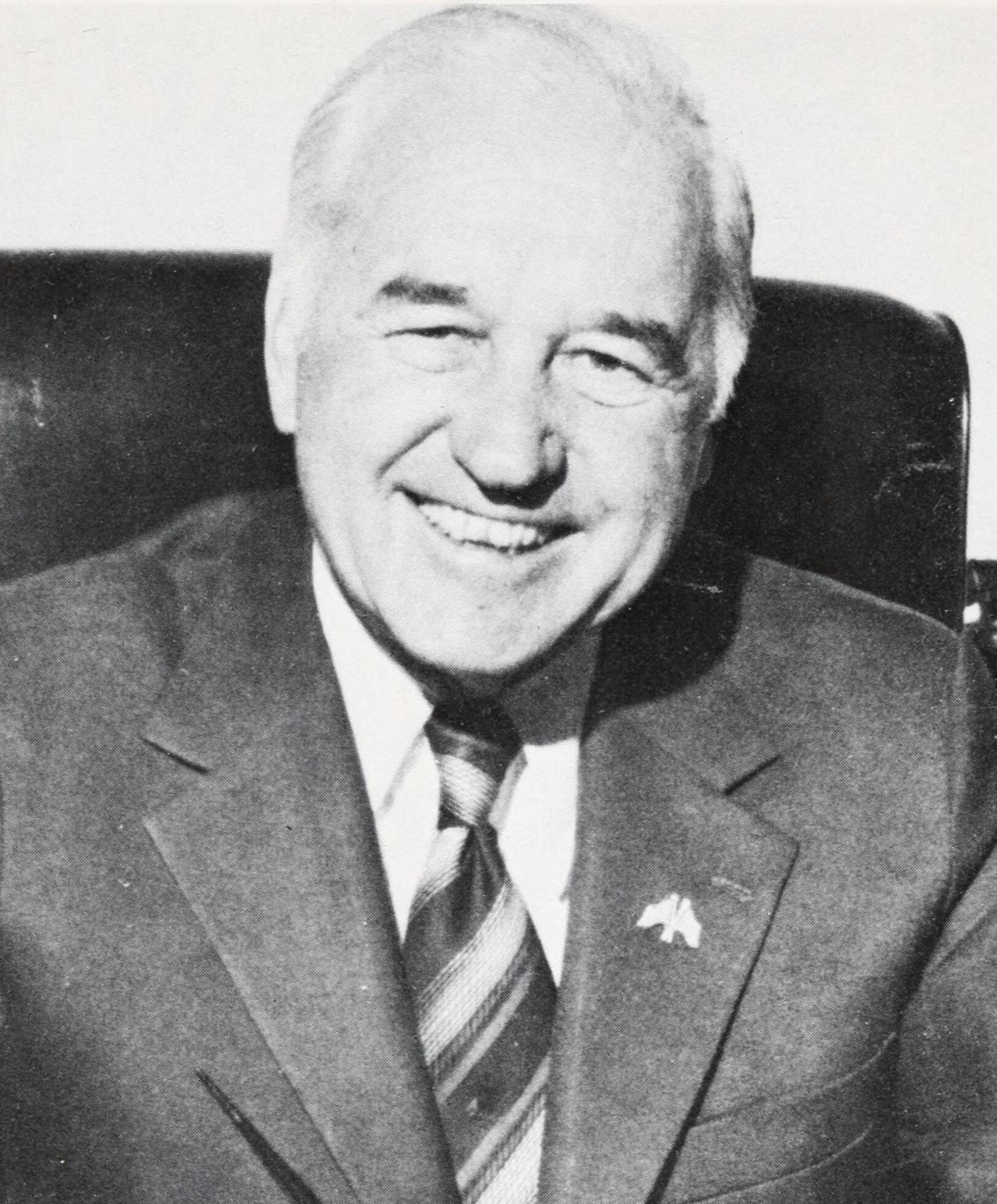

Nominee	Meldrim Thomson	Harry V. Spanos
Party	Republican	Democratic
Popular vote	197,589	145,015
Percentage	57.66%	42.32%
- Thomson: 50–60% 60–70% 70–80% 80–90% >90% Spanos: 50–60% 60–70% 70–80% 80–90% No Data/Vote
Governor before election
Meldrim Thomson Jr.
Republican
Elected Governor
Meldrim Thomson Jr.
Republican

The 1976 New Hampshire gubernatorial election was held on November 2, 1976. Incumbent Republican Governor Meldrim Thomson Jr. defeated Democratic nominee Harry V. Spanos with 57.66% of the vote.

== Primary elections ==
Primary elections were held on September 14, 1976.

=== Democratic primary ===
==== Candidates ====
- Carmen C. Chimento, American Independent Party candidate for the 1974 and 1975 United States Senate elections in New Hampshire
- James A. Connor, former county attorney for Hillsborough County
- Hugh J. Gallen, State Representative
- Harry V. Spanos, former State Senator

==== Results ====
Democratic primary results
Party	Candidate	Votes	%
Democratic	Harry V. Spanos	21,589	40.26
Democratic	James A. Connor	15,758	29.39
Democratic	Hugh J. Gallen	13,629	25.42
Democratic	Write-ins	1,406	2.63
Democratic	Carmen C. Chimento	1,242	2.32
Total votes		53,624	100.00

=== Republican primary ===
==== Candidates ====
- Ralph Brewster
- Meldrim Thomson Jr., incumbent Governor
- Gerald J. Zeiller, former staffer to Senators Styles Bridges and Norris Cotton

==== Results ====
Republican primary results
Party	Candidate	Votes	%
Republican	Meldrim Thomson Jr. (incumbent)	52,968	64.26
Republican	Gerald J. Zeiller	26,728	32.43
Republican	Ralph W. Brewster	2,257	2.74
Republican	Write-ins	471	0.57
Total votes		82,424	100.00

== General election ==
=== Candidates ===
- Harry Spanos, Democratic
- Meldrim Thomson, Republican

=== Results ===
1976 New Hampshire gubernatorial election
Party	Candidate	Votes	%	±%
Republican	Meldrim Thomson Jr. (incumbent)	197,589	57.66%	
Democratic	Harry V. Spanos	145,015	42.32%	
Write-in	Scattering	65	0.02%	
Majority		52,574	15.34%	
Turnout		342,669	100.00%	
Republican hold		Swing		

== Bibliography ==
- Gubernatorial Elections, 1787-1997. Washington, D.C.: Congressional Quarterly Inc. 1998. ISBN 1-56802-396-0.
- Kelley, Edward C., ed. (1977). Manual for the General Court of New Hampshire. Vol. 45. Concord, NH: Department of State, New Hampshire.
- Scammon, Richard M.; McGillivray, Alice V. (1977). America Votes 12: a handbook of contemporary American election statistics, 1976. Washington, D.C.: Elections Research Center.
