= 1970 New Hampshire gubernatorial election =

- November 3, 1970
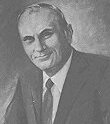

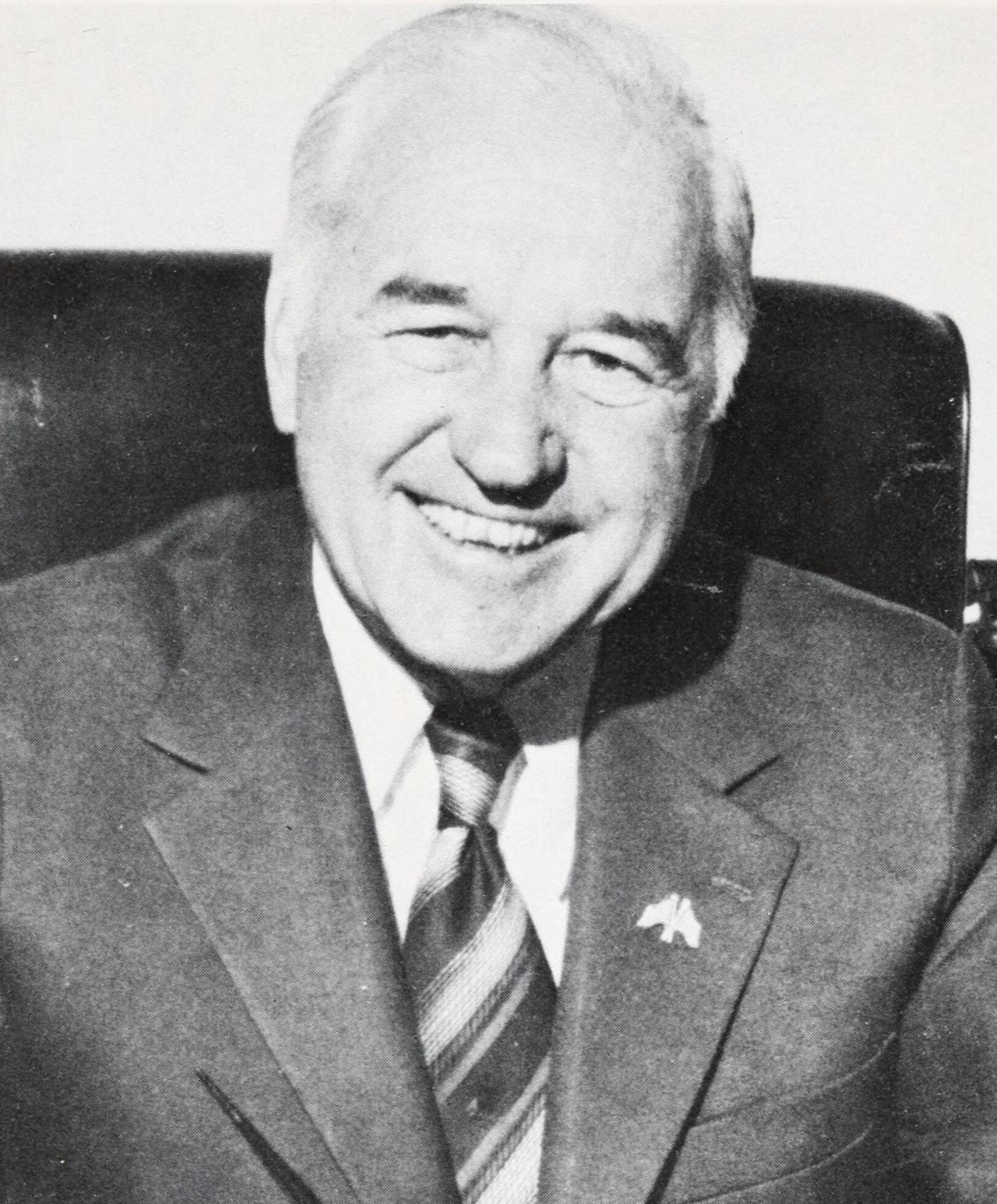
Nominee	Walter R. Peterson Jr.	Roger J. Crowley	Meldrim Thomson
Party	Republican	Democratic	American
Popular vote	102,298	98,098	22,033
Percentage	45.99%	44.10%	9.91%
- Peterson: 30–40% 40–50% 50–60% 60–70% 70–80% 80–90% >90% Crowley: 30–40% 40–50% 50–60% 60–70% 70–80% Thomson: 30–40% 40–50% 50–60% No Data/Vote
Governor before election
Walter R. Peterson Jr.
Republican
Elected Governor
Walter R. Peterson Jr.
Republican

The 1970 New Hampshire gubernatorial election was held on November 3, 1970.

Incumbent Republican Governor Walter R. Peterson Jr. defeated Democratic nominee Roger J. Crowley with 45.99% of the vote.

== Primary elections ==
Primary elections were held on September 8, 1970.

=== Democratic primary ===
==== Candidates ====
- Roger J. Crowley, former State Commissioner of Resources and Economic Development
- Dennis J. Sullivan, Mayor of Nashua
- Charles F. Whittemore, former State Commissioner of Health and Welfare

==== Results ====
Democratic primary results
Party	Candidate	Votes	%
Democratic	Roger J. Crowley	17,089	47.48
Democratic	Charles F. Whittemore	13,354	37.10
Democratic	Dennis J. Sullivan	4,747	13.19
Democratic	Write-ins	804	2.23
Total votes		35,994	100.00

=== Republican primary ===
==== Candidates ====
- Elmer E. Bussey, perennial candidate
- Walter R. Peterson Jr., incumbent Governor
- Meldrim Thomson Jr., publisher and unsuccessful candidate for Republican nomination for Governor in 1968

==== Results ====
Republican primary results
Party	Candidate	Votes	%
Republican	Walter R. Peterson Jr. (incumbent)	43,667	50.87
Republican	Meldrim Thomson Jr.	41,392	48.22
Republican	Elmer E. Bussey	612	0.71
Republican	Write-ins	162	0.19
Total votes		85,833	100.00

== General election ==
=== Candidates ===
- Robert J. Crowley, Democratic
- Walter R. Peterson Jr., Republican
- Meldrim Thomson Jr., American. Having been defeated in the Republican primary, Thomson stood for George Wallace's American Party.

=== Results ===
1970 New Hampshire gubernatorial election
Party	Candidate	Votes	%	±%
Republican	Walter R. Peterson Jr. (incumbent)	102,298	45.99%	
Democratic	Robert J. Crowley	98,098	44.10%	
American	Meldrim Thomson Jr.	22,033	9.91%	
Write-in	Scattering	12	0.01%	
Majority		4,200	1.89%	
Turnout		222,441	100.00%	
Republican hold		Swing		

== Bibliography ==
- Gubernatorial Elections, 1787-1997. Washington, D.C.: Congressional Quarterly Inc. 1998. ISBN 1-56802-396-0.
- Stark, Robert L., ed. (1971). Manual for the General Court of New Hampshire. Vol. 42. Concord, NH: Department of State, New Hampshire.
- Scammon, Richard M., ed. (1972). America Votes 9: a handbook of contemporary American election statistics, 1970. Washington, D.C.: Governmental Affairs Institute. ISBN 9780871870339.
