= 1978 New Hampshire gubernatorial election =

- November 7, 1978
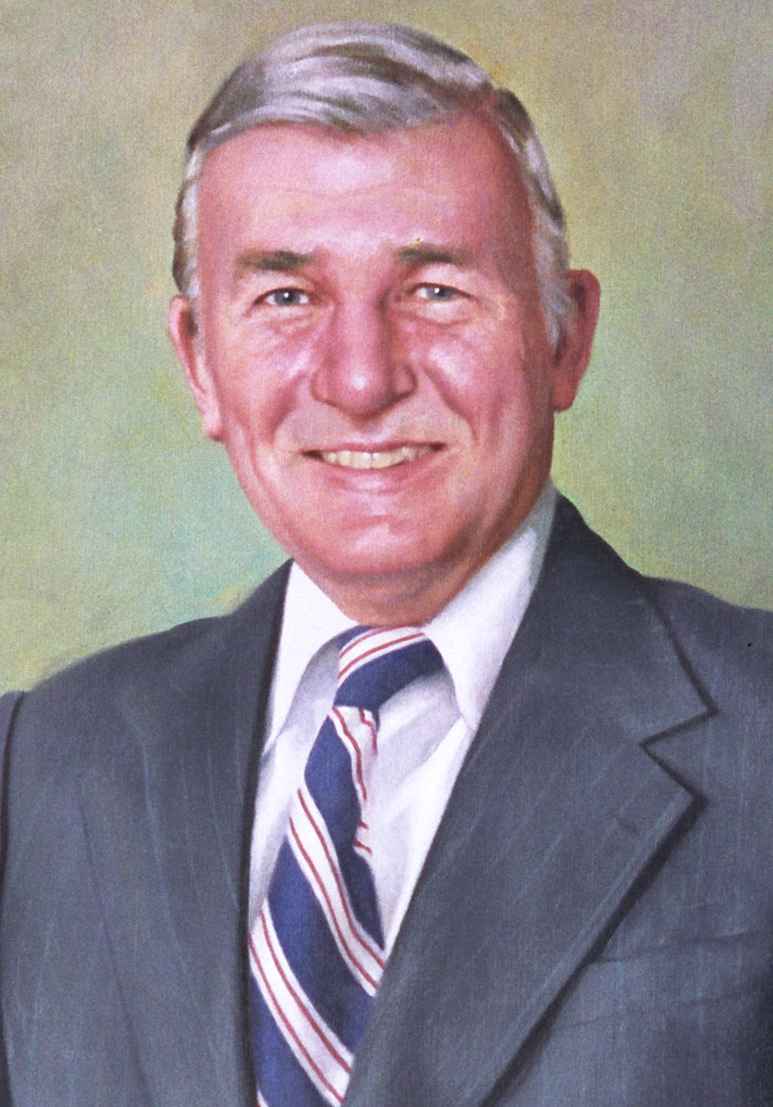

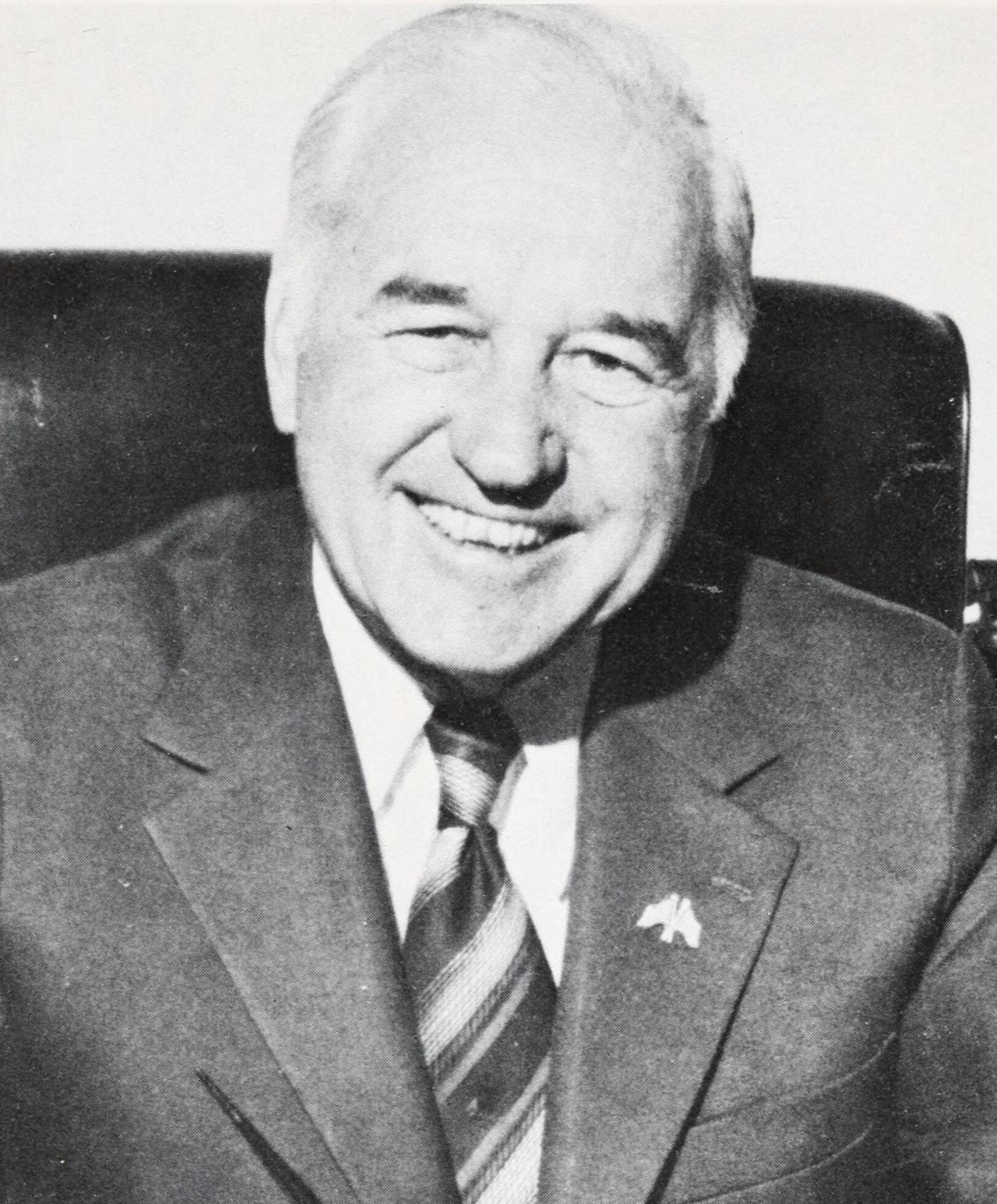
Nominee	Hugh Gallen	Meldrim Thomson
Party	Democratic	Republican
Popular vote	133,133	122,464
Percentage	49.38%	45.43%
- Gallen: 40–50% 50–60% 60–70% 70–80% 80–90% >90% Thomson: 40–50% 50–60% 60–70% 70–80% 80–90% >90% Brewster: >90% No Data/Vote
Governor before election
Meldrim Thomson Jr.
Republican
Elected Governor
Hugh Gallen
Democratic

The 1978 New Hampshire gubernatorial election took place on November 7, 1978.

Incumbent Republican governor Meldrim Thomson Jr., who defeated former governor Wesley Powell for the Republican nomination, ran for a fourth term in office, but was defeated by former State Representative Hugh Gallen.

== Election results ==
1978 New Hampshire gubernatorial election
Party	Candidate	Votes	%	±%
Democratic	Hugh Gallen	133,133	49.38%	
Republican	Meldrim Thomson, Jr. (incumbent)	122,464	45.43%	
Independent	Wesley Powell	12,349	4.58%	
Libertarian	Mabel G. Everett	1,217	0.45%	
Independent	Ralph Brewster	424	0.16%	
Democratic gain from Republican		Swing		
