= 1980 New Hampshire gubernatorial election =

- November 4, 1980
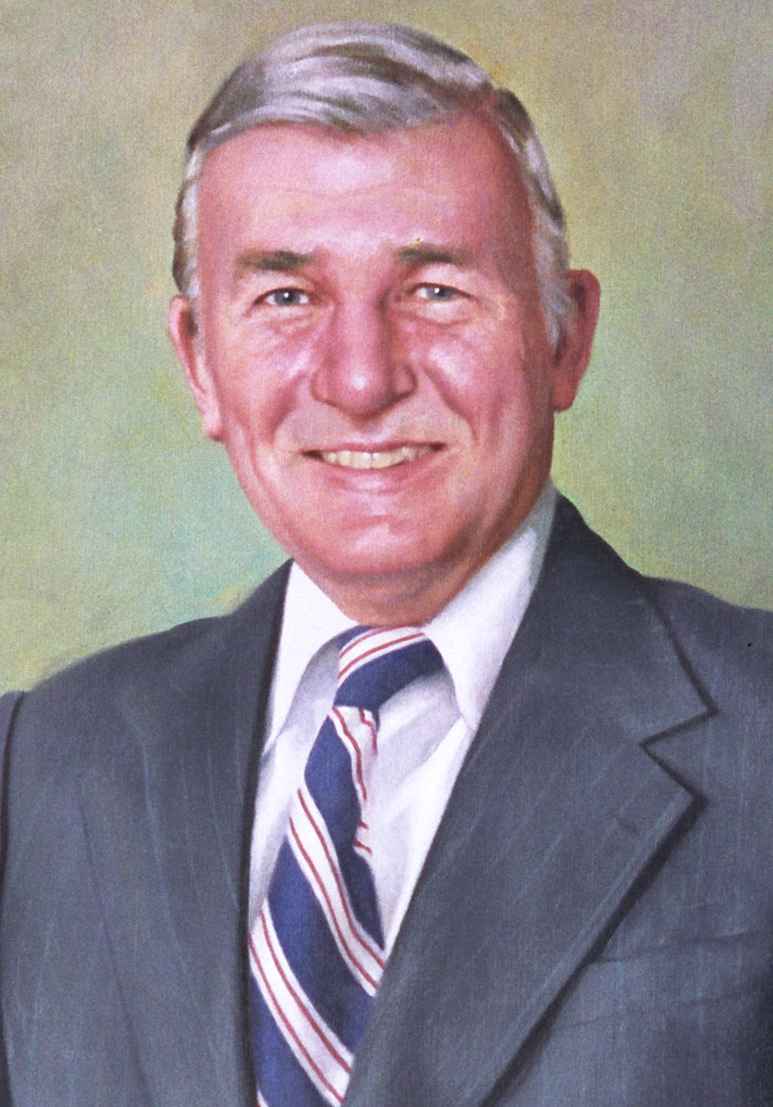

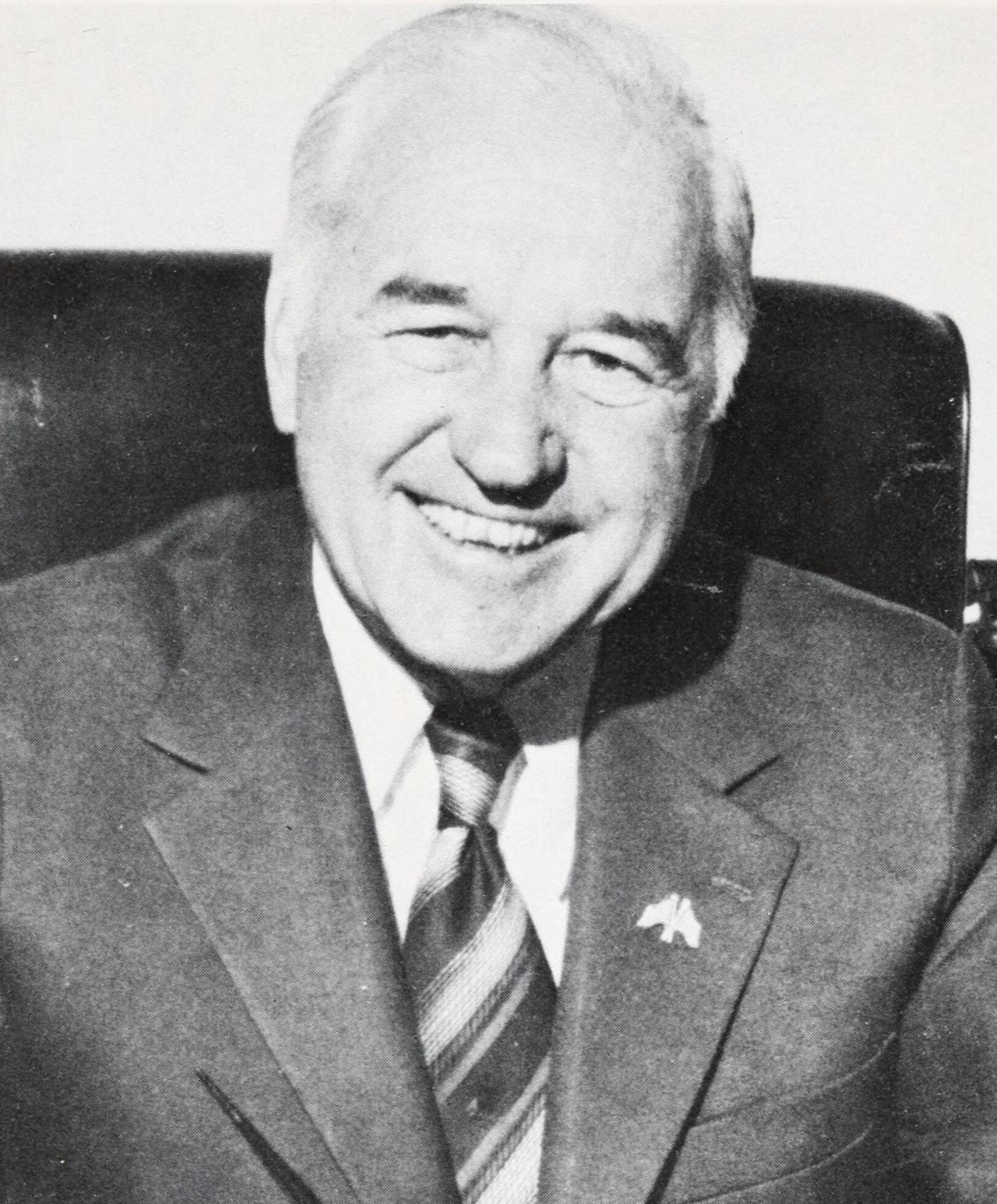
Nominee	Hugh Gallen	Meldrim Thomson
Party	Democratic	Republican
Popular vote	226,436	156,178
Percentage	58.96%	40.67%
- Gallen: 40–50% 50–60% 60–70% 70–80% 80–90% Thomson: 40–50% 50–60% 60–70% 70–80% 80–90% >90% Tie: 50%
Governor before election
Hugh Gallen
Democratic
Elected Governor
Hugh Gallen
Democratic

The 1980 New Hampshire gubernatorial election took place on November 4, 1980. Incumbent Democratic governor Hugh Gallen was re-elected to a second term in office in a landslide, once again defeating former governor Meldrim Thomson Jr., who defeated Lou D'Allesandro for the Republican nomination. Ronald Reagan carried the state in a landslide in the simultaneous presidential election.

== Election results ==
1980 New Hampshire gubernatorial election
Party	Candidate	Votes	%	±%
Democratic	Hugh Gallen (incumbent)	226,436	58.96%	
Republican	Meldrim Thomson, Jr.	156,178	40.67%	
Libertarian	James Pinnaird	1,318	0.34%	
Write-in	All others	99	0.03%	
Democratic hold		Swing		
