= 1982 New Hampshire gubernatorial election =

- November 2, 1982
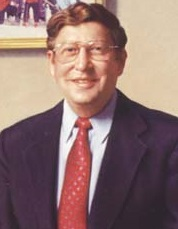

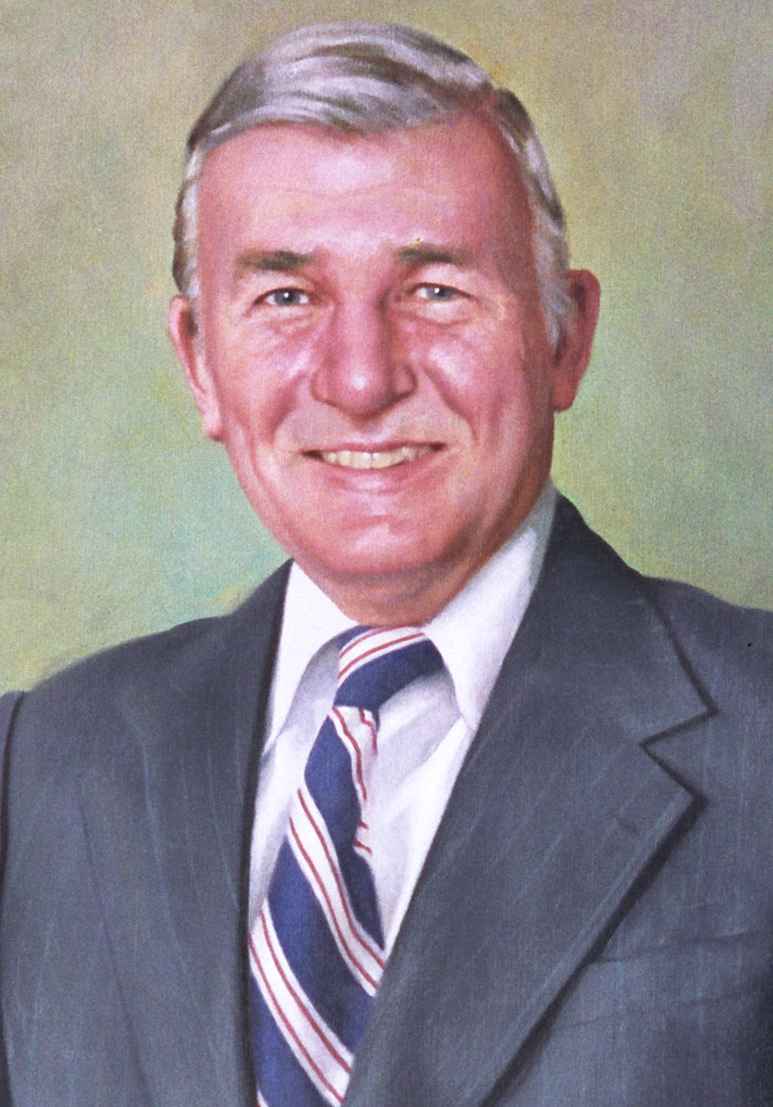
Nominee	John H. Sununu	Hugh Gallen
Party	Republican	Democratic
Popular vote	145,389	132,317
Percentage	51.47%	46.84%
- Sununu: 40–50% 50–60% 60–70% 70–80% Gallen: 40–50% 50–60% 60–70% >90%
Governor before election
Hugh Gallen
Democratic
Elected Governor
John H. Sununu
Republican

The 1982 New Hampshire gubernatorial election took place on November 2, 1982.

Incumbent Democratic governor Hugh Gallen ran for re-election but was defeated by Tufts University professor John Sununu. Sununu, who defeated Lou D'Allesandro for the Republican nomination, became the first Arab-American governor of New Hampshire. Gallen died just over a week before Sununu's inauguration.

== Election results ==
1982 New Hampshire gubernatorial election
Party	Candidate	Votes	%	±%
Republican	John H. Sununu	145,389	51.47%	
Democratic	Hugh Gallen (incumbent)	132,317	46.84%	
Independent	Meldrim Thomson, Jr.	4,785	1.69%	
Republican gain from Democratic		Swing		
