= Ivorey Cobb =

American jurist (1911–1992)

- Born: September 28, 1911; Andalusia, Alabama
- Died: December 18, 1992 (aged 81)
- Occupations: Judge, Army major, newspaper editor and publisher
- Known for: First African American jurist to hold judgeship in New Hampshire

Ivorey Cobb (September 28, 1911 – December 18, 1992) was an American newspaper editor, publisher, United States Army major, lawyer, and judge who became the first African American to hold a judgeship in New Hampshire.

== Early life ==
Cobb was born in Andalusia, Alabama, to Sam Cobb and Minerva "Minnie" Jenkins Cobb Squires. His family moved to Pittsburgh, Pennsylvania, when he was a young child, where he attended Watt Elementary and Fifth Avenue High School. He graduated in 1933 and later enrolled at Duquesne University. In 1935, he wrote a letter to well known sociologist and civil-rights activist W.E.B. DuBois expressing his interest and support for DuBois's leadership after reading an article that he wrote, "A Negro Nation Within a Nation", that was included in an issue of Current History Magazine. Cobb would go on to pursue careers in both journalism and justice, remaining a staunch advocate for equal rights and a proud member of the African-American community.

== Career ==
=== Pittsburgh Examiner ===
Cobb sought work as a newspaper editor for the Pittsburgh Crusader before going on to found, edit and publish the Pittsburgh Examiner, an African-American newspaper and part of the Allegheny County Independent Publishers' Association, in 1937. In 1938, Cobb married Pittsburgh native Elsie Margaret Cobb, née Stanton. The pair would go on to have three daughters: Marilyn, Gretel, and Louise. In 1940, Cobb attended a newspaper publishing conference held by John Herman Henry Sengstacke of The Chicago Defender, focused on creating the National Newspaper Publisher Association.

=== Military service ===
In 1942, Cobb enlisted in the United States Army, where he would serve for the next twenty years, including during World War II and the Korean War. Throughout his career he was stationed in various places across Europe, including Salzburg, Austria, Trieste, Italy, and Munich, Germany. During his time at Fort Devens in Massachusetts, Cobb was also studying law at Suffolk University while remaining the editor of both the Camp Drum Sentinel and Fort Devens Dispatch newspapers.

By the time of his retirement from the military in 1962, Cobb had risen to the rank of major.

== Education ==
Cobb remained interested in pursuing education even after joining the Army and continued additional undergraduate and graduate studies at multiple universities, including Northeastern University, the University of Maryland Overseas Division and Rutgers University. He received his Bachelor of Laws degree in 1960 from Suffolk University School of Law and, upon his retirement from the military in 1962, began his own law practice after moving from Harvard, Massachusetts, to Colebrook, New Hampshire. A few years later, in 1965, Suffolk University awarded him Honorary Doctor of Laws.

== Judgeship ==
In 1964, Cobb was appointed Special Justice of the Colebrook Municipal Court by the New Hampshire Executive Council after being nominated the same year by Governor John W. King. Additionally, his peers elected him Coos County Bar Association President. In the fall of 1968, Cobb was confirmed as Justice of the Colebrook District Court, thereby making him the first African-American judge in New Hampshire history. Cobb was chosen to serve on the New Hampshire Commission for Civil Rights by Governor Meldrim Thomson, Jr. in 1973.

During his career as a jurist, Cobb served on many councils and committees and was an active member in multiple associations. He was a founding member of the Judicial Council of the National Bar Association along with George Crockett Jr. and James Lopez Watson. He also was a member of the World Association of Judges of the World Peace through Law Center, the New Hampshire Bar Association, the NAACP, and the New Hampshire Commission for Civil Rights.

== Death ==
Cobb retired in 1981, having served as judge of the Colebrook District Court for 13 years. He died a little over a decade later, on December 18, 1992, eight months before the death of Elsie Margaret Stanton Cobb on August 28, 1993. Cobb and Elsie were survived by their three daughters and seven grandchildren.
