= John Shea (New Hampshire politician) =

American politician

John D. Shea was a New Hampshire Democratic politician who represented District 2 in the New Hampshire Executive Council from 2006 to 2010.

Shea was elected to the Council in 2006, defeating 12-term incumbent Peter Spaulding. He benefited from robust support for the Democrats in New Hampshire's 2006 elections, which saw the party take both of the state's Congressional seats and win control of both houses of the state legislature. The victory came as a surprise to Shea, who put his name forward mainly so that there would be a Democratic name on the ballot, and did not expect to win. He departed on election night for a two-week vacation in Belgium, only learning of his victory after arriving at his hotel the following day. He was reelected in 2008 and lost his re-election bid in 2010 to Dan St. Hilaire.

Shea, a graduate of Burdett College in Boston, was a Keene city councilor and state representative in the 1960s. He resided in Nelson, New Hampshire.
