= Hugh Gallen =

American politician

Hugh J. Gallen
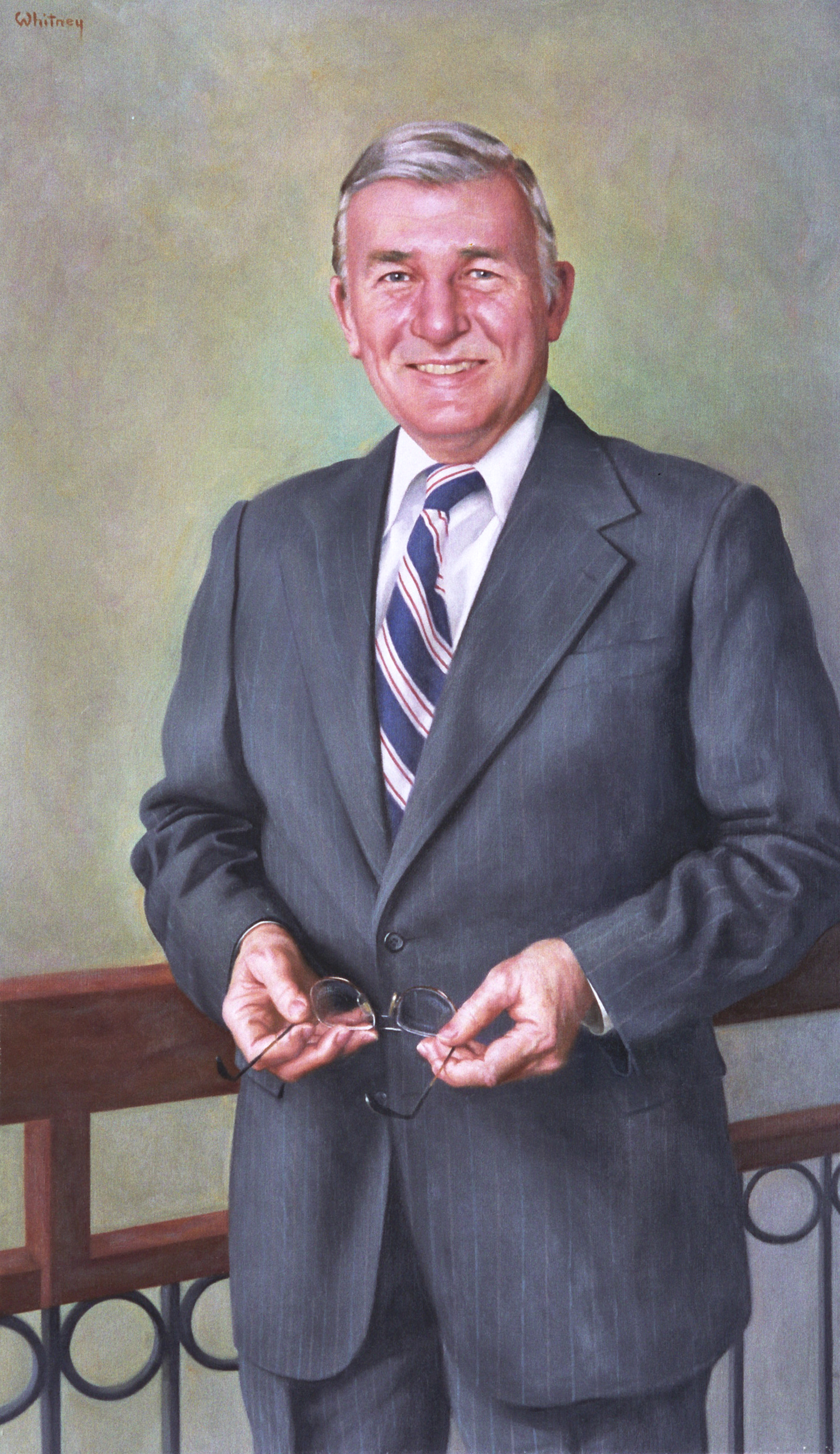

74th Governor of New Hampshire
- In office January 4, 1979 – December 29, 1982
- Preceded by: Meldrim Thomson
- Succeeded by: Vesta M. Roy (acting)

Personal details
- Born: Hugh Joseph Gallen; July 30, 1924 Portland, Oregon, U.S.
- Died: December 29, 1982 (aged 58) Boston, Massachusetts, U.S.
- Party: Democratic
- Spouse: Irene Carbonneau (m. 1948)
- Children: 3

Hugh Joseph Gallen (July 30, 1924 – December 29, 1982) was an American automobile dealer and Democratic politician from Littleton, New Hampshire. After serving in the New Hampshire House of Representatives, he served as the 74th governor of New Hampshire from 1979 until his death in 1982 having already lost reelection to Republican John H. Sununu.

== Early life ==
Born in Portland, Oregon, Gallen's family moved to Medford, Massachusetts, when he was six. As a young man, Gallen relocated to Littleton, New Hampshire, and joined the Civilian Conservation Corps. Gallen had a successful tryout with the Washington Senators baseball team—signed to a minor-league contract as a pitcher in February 1947, he played for their Kingsport Cherokees affiliate for part of that season, but an arm injury ended his career.

Gallen worked as a truck driver, carpenter, and laborer in a paper mill before entering the auto sales industry, buying a General Motors dealership in Littleton. In 1948, he married Irene Carbonneau, a native of Littleton, and together the couple had three children.

== Early political career ==
Gallen entered politics as a member of Littleton Planning Board, serving from 1962 to 1965. In 1964, he became full owner of an automobile dealership. From 1967, he sat on the Small Business Administration's New Hampshire Advisory Council and was director and chairman of the New Hampshire-Vermont Development Council from 1969 to 1972. As chairman of the Democratic State Committee, he was a key supporter of Edmund Muskie's presidential campaign in 1972. The same year, Gallen was elected to the New Hampshire House of Representatives, the first Democrat elected to the legislature from Littleton in four decades. He ran in the 1974 and 1976 gubernatorial elections, but came third in the Democratic primary on both occasions.

== Governorship (1979–1982) ==
Gallen ran for governor a third time in the 1978 election, easily winning the Democratic nomination. In the general election, he faced incumbent Republican governor Meldrim Thomson Jr. During the campaign, Gallen pledged to outlaw controversial "Construction Work In Progress" electric rates, which allowed the Public Service Company of New Hampshire to charge customers in advance for construction of the Seabrook Station Nuclear Power Plant. Former Republican governor Wesley Powell, who Thomson defeated in the Republican primary, ran in the general election as an independent. Powell split the Republican vote, and on November 7, 1978, Gallen was elected governor, defeating Thomson, by 10,669 votes.

In his first term, Gallen pushed through legislation preventing the Public Service Company of New Hampshire from increasing rates to fund construction of the Seabrook Station Nuclear Power Plant.. In 1979, Gallen called out the New Hampshire National Guard to protect the Seabrook power plant against anti-nuclear demonstrators. in March 1980 Gallen and other officials were made targets for harassing telephone calls according to a list found in a room occupied by a campaigner for Lyndon LaRouche, a candidate for the 1980 Democratic Presidential nomination. by May 1980, Gallen's attention to politics and administrative work in the state capital caused him some personal financial difficulties, and he had to close his failing automobile dealership. Less than a year later, he was in thousands of dollars in debt.

In 1980, Gallen ran for a second term, again facing Thomson. On November 4, Gallen was re-elected by 70,258 votes, even as Ronald Reagan handily won New Hampshire in the presidential election and Democratic senator John Durkin was unseated by Republican Warren Rudman in the Senate election. In December 1980 Senator John Durkin resigned from office, Gallen appointed Warren Rudman, who had already been elected to the next term, to finish Durkin's term.

Gallen's second term was marked by struggles with the Republican-led legislature. In 1981, 9,200 state employees struck for higher wages. In negotiations, Gallen agreed to a 9% raise; but the Republican-controlled legislature would only agree to a 6% raise. In 1981, Gallen became the first New Hampshire governor to veto a state budget, calling for more funding for social services. He called the spending plan "fundamentally and fatally flawed" and told legislators that a budget, more than any other government document, spells out the state's "level of compassion, its sense of justice and its concern for equity." During this time, the state faced a $30 million budget deficit and lost its triple-A bond rating.

Gallen ran for a third term in 1982, facing former state representative and Tufts University professor John H. Sununu in the general election. As he had in his previous two campaigns, Gallen would not take "The Pledge" to veto a state sales or income tax (if such a bill came to his desk) to pay for the state employees’ contract, and he called the state's tax system "obsolete". Largely due to this, Gallen lost to Sununu, by 13,072 votes, in spite of large Democratic gains in the midterm elections that year. Gallen was the only Democratic governor to lose reelection in 1982 and, along with California, New Hampshire was one of only two governorships picked up by the Republicans that year.

== Death ==
Soon after his defeat in the November 1982 election, Gallen was hospitalized with a blood infection while on vacation in Saint Croix and was airlifted to Brigham and Women's Hospital in Boston. The infection impaired his liver and kidneys and he required dialysis. Out of state and unable to carry out the responsibilities of the governorship, power was transferred to the state's president of the senate, at the time Robert B. Monier, then Vesta M. Roy when the new legislature was seated in December. Gallen's condition did not improve and he died of organ failure in Boston on December 29, 1982. Roy served as acting governor, the first woman to do so, for the final days of Gallen's term until Sununu was sworn in to office on January 6, 1983. Gallen was buried at Saint Rose of Lima New Catholic Cemetery in Littleton.

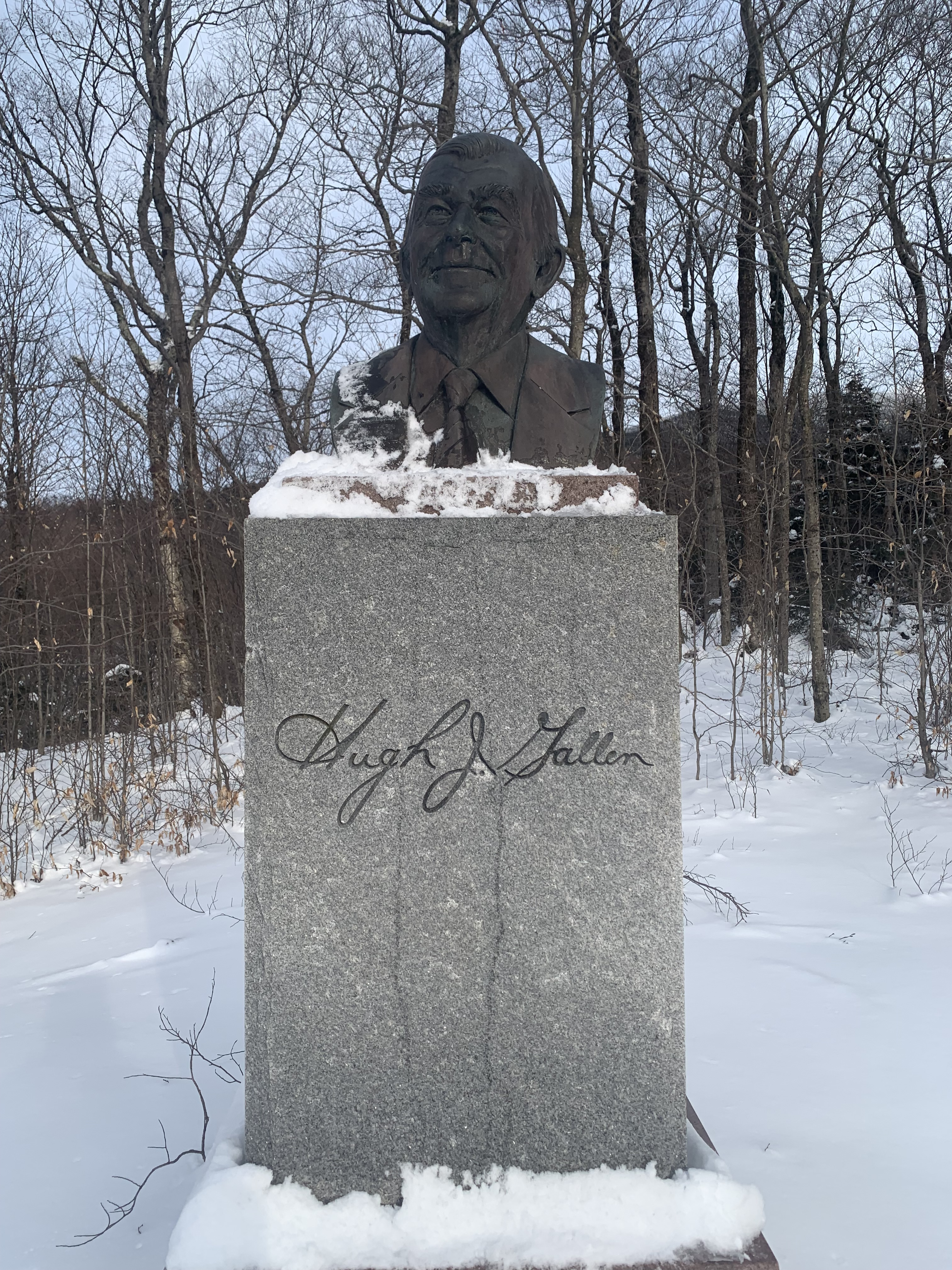
A bust of Hugh J. Gallen at a memorial dedicated to him.

Party political offices
| Preceded by Harry V. Spanos | Democratic nominee for Governor of New Hampshire; 1978, 1980, 1982 | Succeeded by Chris Spirou |
Political offices
| Preceded by Meldrim Thomson Jr. | Governor of New Hampshire; 1979–1982 | Succeeded by Vesta M. Roy; Acting |
