= Meldrim Thomson =

American politician (1912–2001)

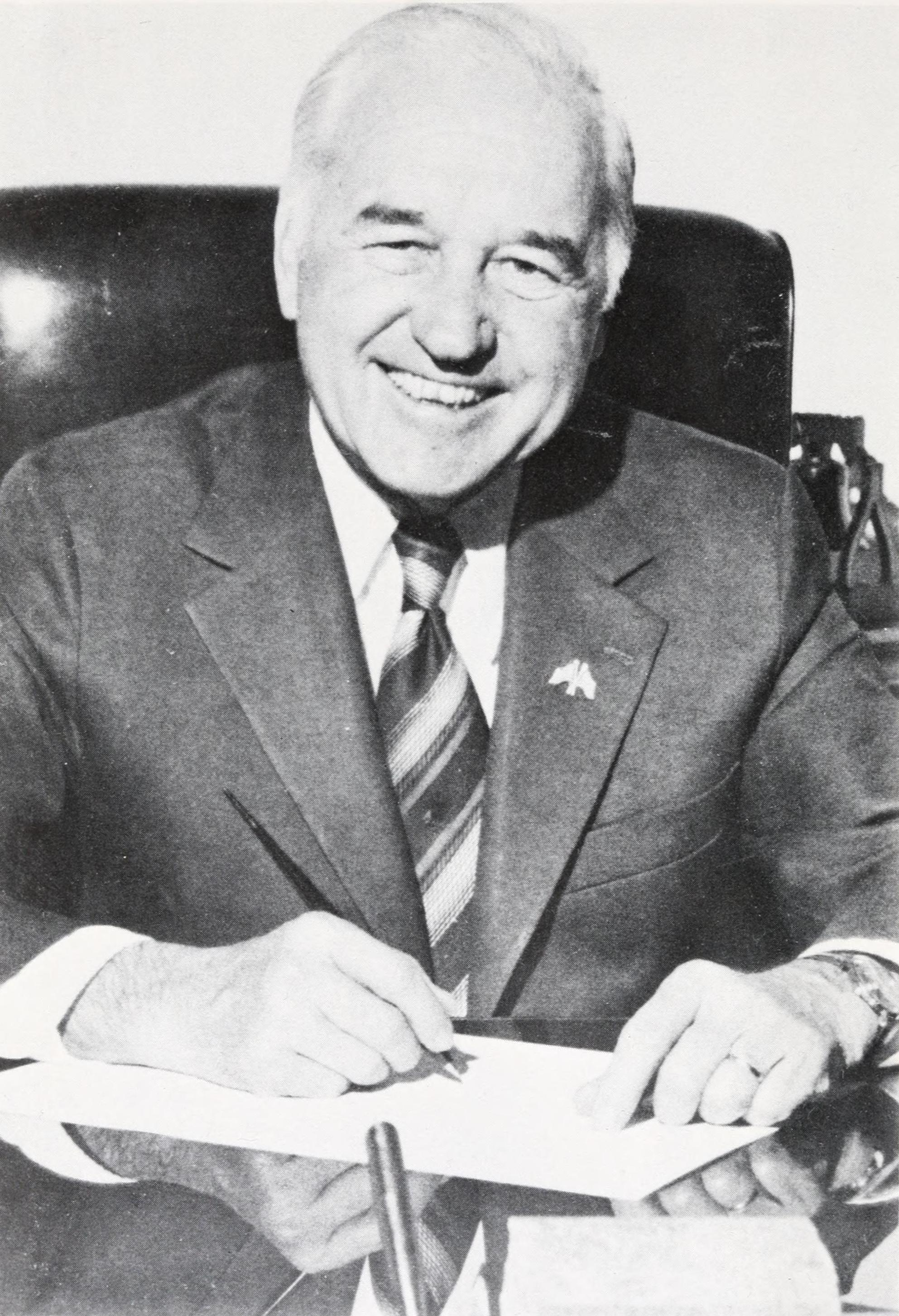
- Thomson, c. 1977

73rd Governor of New Hampshire
- In office January 4, 1973 – January 4, 1979
- Preceded by: Walter R. Peterson Jr.
- Succeeded by: Hugh J. Gallen

Personal details
- Born: Meldrim Thomson Jr. March 8, 1912 Wilkinsburg, Pennsylvania, U.S.
- Died: April 19, 2001 (aged 89) Orford, New Hampshire, U.S.
- Party: Republican
- Other political affiliations: American Independent (1970)
- Spouse: Anne Gale Kelly (m. 1938)
- Children: 6
- Profession: Politician

Meldrim Thomson Jr. (March 8, 1912 – April 19, 2001) was an American politician who served three terms as the 73rd governor of New Hampshire from 1973 to 1979. A Republican, he was known as a staunch conservative.

== Early life ==
Thomson was born in 1912 in Wilkinsburg, Pennsylvania, the son of Meldrim and Marion (Booth) Thomson, and was raised in Georgia and Florida. He was an Eagle Scout. Thomson attended Mercer University, Washington and Jefferson College, and the University of Georgia School of Law and was admitted to the practice of law in Florida in 1936.

In 1938, he married his secretary, Anne Gale Kelly. They had six children.

Thomson made his fortune publishing law books, founding the Equity Publishing Corporation in 1952. In both English and Spanish, it published the laws of New Hampshire, Vermont, the U.S. Virgin Islands, and Puerto Rico. In 1955, he moved his family to New Hampshire and began advocating for education and tax policy.

== Political career ==
In 1966, as chairman of the Orford School Board, Thomson refused to accept federal education aid because he said there were too many strings attached. He lost races for governor in Republican primaries in 1968 and 1970, running again in the 1970 general election on the third-party American Independent party. Receiving 10% of the vote

== Governor of New Hampshire ==
=== Elections ===
In 1972, Thomson ran for governor again as a Republican. He defeated governor Walter R. Peterson Jr. In the Republican primary and faced Democrat Robert J. Crowley. In the general election he pledged to veto any new sales or income tax that was put on his desk, and he further promised not to raise existing taxes. Thomson was elected governor defeating Crowley 41% to 39%.

In 1974, Thomson ran for a second term against Democrat Richard W. Leonard. Thomson was narrowly reelected, defeating Leonard 51% to 49%. In 1976, Thomson ran for a third term against Democrat Harry V. Spanos. He was re-elected in a landslide 58% to 42%. In 1978, Thomson ran for a fourth term, defeating former governor Wesley Powell in the Republican primary and faced Democrat Hugh Gallen. In the general election, Powell ran as an independent, splitting the Republican vote. Thomson lost re-election to Gallen 49% to 45%. In 1980, Thomson initially ran for president as a third party candidate but dropped out and ran for governor again as a Republican, defeating Lou D'Allesandro for Republican nomination. Facing Gallen in a rematch, Thomson was defeated in a landslide 59% to 41%. In 1982, he ran for governor as an independent, getting just 2% of the vote.

=== Tenure ===
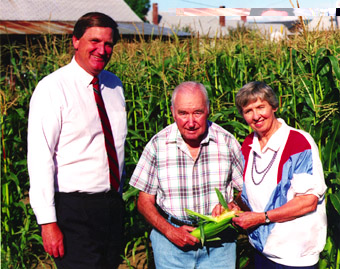
Thomson and his wife meet with Senator Bob Smith

Thomson coined the slogans "Low taxes are the result of low spending" and "Ax the Tax" to represent his fiscal philosophy. He was also a strong proponent of state sovereignty. When Thomson learned that Massachusetts tax agents were at New Hampshire liquor stores taking down the numbers on cars with Massachusetts license plates, he had them arrested. When he learned that Maine had arrested a Portsmouth, New Hampshire lobsterman, in Maine waters, he began what was known as the "Lobster war." The conflict ended in the U.S. Supreme Court with the drawing of an ocean boundary between the two states at the mouth of the Piscataqua River.

In 1978, Thomson appointed David Souter to the Superior Court bench. Souter would later become a Justice of the Supreme Court of the United States. Thomson also appointed Ivorey Cobb, the first African-American judge in New Hampshire state history, to the New Hampshire Commission for Civil Rights.

== Controversies ==
During his governorship, and thereafter, Thomson took the following actions:

- in 1976 and 1977 he ordered the flag at the statehouse to be flown at half-staff including on Good Friday to "memorialise the death of Christ on the Cross."
- during the 1977 anti-nuclear demonstrations at the Seabrook Nuclear Power Station, he was brought in by helicopter to order the arrest of 1,400 protesters.
- personally arresting speeders from his official car.
- visiting South Africa in 1978 and then praising the government.
- sending out a press release in 1977 saying that he wanted journalists to keep the "Christ" in Christmas and not call it Xmas, which, he asserted, was a pagan spelling of Christmas

== 1980 presidential election bid ==
Thomson was one of Ronald Reagan's staunchest supporters in 1976, as the former California governor challenged President Gerald Ford for the Republican presidential nomination. Thomson was dismayed by Reagan's announcement that he would select moderate Republican Senator Richard Schweiker of Pennsylvania as his running mate should he win the nomination.

After he was defeated in 1978, Thomson left the Republican party to form his own Constitution Party. However, after getting on the presidential general-election ballot in Alabama, Kansas, Utah, Wisconsin, and Maine, his campaign contributions dried up when it was evident that Ronald Reagan was going to win the Republican nomination for president. Thomson then ended his campaign for president and returned to the Republican Party.

== Later years, death, and honors ==
After retiring from politics, Thomson wrote a column for The Union Leader and worked on his maple sugar farm. Thomson died in 2001 aged 89 from Parkinson's disease and heart problems in Orford, New Hampshire.

In 2002, the state named both a state building and state road in honor of Thomson. The state office complex on Hazen Drive in Concord was named "Meldrim Thomson Jr. State Office Complex." A 16-mile stretch of Route 25A, where his Mt. Cube Farm lined both sides of the road, was named the "Governor Meldrim Thomson Scenic Highway."

Party political offices
First	American Party nominee for Governor of New Hampshire; 1970	Succeeded by None
Preceded by Walter R. Peterson Jr.	Republican nominee for Governor of New Hampshire; 1972, 1974, 1976, 1978, 1980	Succeeded by John H. Sununu
Political offices
Preceded by Walter R. Peterson Jr.	Governor of New Hampshire; 1973–1979	Succeeded by Hugh J. Gallen
