= Walter R. Peterson Jr. =

American politician

Walter Rutherford Peterson Jr.
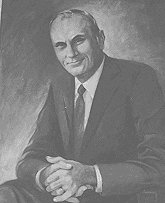

72nd Governor of New Hampshire
- In office January 2, 1969 – January 4, 1973
- Preceded by: John W. King
- Succeeded by: Meldrim Thomson

Member of the New Hampshire House of Representatives
- In office 1961

Personal details
- Born: September 19, 1922 Nashua, New Hampshire, U.S.
- Died: June 1, 2011 (aged 88) Peterborough, New Hampshire, U.S.
- Party: Republican
- Spouse: Dorothy Donovan (m. 1949)
- Children: 2
- Education: College of William and Mary University of New Hampshire Dartmouth College

Walter Rutherford Peterson Jr. (September 19, 1922 – June 1, 2011) was an American realtor, educator, and Republican politician from Peterborough, New Hampshire, who served in the New Hampshire House of Representatives and two terms as the 72nd governor of New Hampshire from 1969 to 1973.

== Early life ==
Peterson was born September 19, 1922, in Nashua, New Hampshire, and graduated from Nashua High School and New Hampton School. He attended the College of William & Mary and the University of New Hampshire and graduated from Dartmouth College in 1947. Peterson left his college studies to fulfill four years' service as a United States Navy Reserve officer in the South Pacific during World War II. After graduating from Dartmouth College, Peterson became a partner in The Petersons, Inc., a real estate firm in Peterborough, New Hampshire where he and family members worked until the late 1990s.

He married Dorothy Donovan in 1949. They had two children, Margaret and Andrew.

== Political career ==
Peterson joined New Hampshire state politics in 1961 where he served as a representative and House Speaker. He served as manager of Norris Cotton's Senate campaigns.

== Governorship ==
A member of the moderate to liberal wing of the New Hampshire Republican Party, Peterson served as governor of New Hampshire from 1969–1973, in a period when the state was experiencing rapid growth and looking for ways to fund new infrastructure costs. In order to spur economic growth in the state, Peterson fought for tax reform, eliminating thirteen separate capital and businesses taxes, and replacing them with a tax on business profits. Peterson also established a “Task Force on Government Organization” in order to modernize state government. Although a Republican, Peterson believed no political party had a monopoly on good ideas, and thought of himself as a governor for all New Hampshirites.

During his governorship, Peterson received a phone call from Barbara Battenfeld, a Democrat and anti-Vietnam War activist, who attacked him for not speaking out against the war. Peterson ran into Battenfeld years later and admitted she was right about the war.

Peterson went on to lose the 1972 Republican primaries to Meldrim Thomson Jr., a member of the right wing of the New Hampshire Republican Party, who was endorsed by ultraconservative newspaper publisher William Loeb. Peterson had incurred Loeb's wrath by renouncing "The Pledge" to veto a state income or sales tax, by proposing a 3% income tax. Loeb had also attacked Peterson's daughter Margaret for her supposed support of marijuana use, causing her to suffer an emotional breakdown.

== Life after politics ==
After Peterson's term as governor, he became President of Franklin Pierce College in 1975, and served until his retirement in 1995. He also served one year as president of the University of New Hampshire. In 1996 he became a trustee of the University System of New Hampshire. The University built a residence hall named SERC Hall B In 2007, on October 11, 2013, this hall was renamed to Peterson Hall in his honor.

During the 2008 election cycle, Peterson served as honorary chairman of John McCain's campaign during the New Hampshire primary, and as Chairman of Republicans for Lynch, a group of Republicans supporting the re-election of Democratic governor John Lynch. At age 86, his name emerged as a possible appointee to the United States Senate if Judd Gregg accepted the offer to serve as Secretary of Commerce in the cabinet of President Barack Obama. Gregg, however, subsequently withdrew his name from consideration after he was nominated.

Although supportive of a 3% income tax during his time as governor, Peterson later felt that a state income tax would only work in the short term. He was also supportive of those who supported abortion and gay rights.

== Death ==
In March 2011, Peterson (who was not a smoker) was diagnosed with lung cancer. He died on June 1.

Party political offices
Preceded by Hugh Gregg	Republican nominee for Governor of New Hampshire; 1968, 1970	Succeeded by Meldrim Thomson Jr.
Political offices
Preceded by John W. King	Governor of New Hampshire; 1969–1973	Succeeded by Meldrim Thomson Jr.
