= 1976 United States gubernatorial elections =

← 1975	November 2, 1976	1977 →

15 governorships 14 states; 1 territory
	Majority party	Minority party
Party	Democratic	Republican
Seats before	36	13
Seats after	37	12
Seat change	▲1	▼1
Seats up	8	6
Seats won	9	5
- Republican hold Republican gain Democratic hold Democratic gain

United States gubernatorial elections were held on November 2, 1976, in 14 states and one territory. Democrats achieved a net gain of one in these elections. This coincided with the House, Senate elections, and the presidential election.

This was the last year in which Illinois held a gubernatorial election on the same year as the presidential election. The state of Illinois moved its gubernatorial election date to midterm congressional election years. As a result, the governor elected this year, served a term of only two years.

== Election results ==
State	Incumbent	Party	First elected	Result	Candidates
Arkansas	David Pryor	Democratic	1974	Incumbent re-elected.	✓ David Pryor (Democratic) 83.24%; Leon Griffith (Republican) 16.74%
Delaware	Sherman W. Tribbitt	Democratic	1972	Incumbent lost re-election. New governor elected. Republican gain.	✓ Pete du Pont (Republican) 56.86%; Sherman W. Tribbitt (Democratic) 42.46%; George Cripps (American) 0.55%; Harry Connor (Prohibition) 0.13%
Illinois	Dan Walker	Democratic	1972	Incumbent lost re-nomination. New governor elected. Republican gain.	✓ James R. Thompson (Republican) 64.68%; Michael Howlett (Democratic) 34.71%; Ishmael Flory (Communist) 0.22%
Indiana	Otis Bowen	Republican	1972	Incumbent re-elected.	✓ Otis Bowen (Republican) 56.85%; Larry Conrad (Democratic) 42.63%; Daniel P. Talbot (American) 0.45%; Samuel L. Washington (U.S. Labor) 0.08%
Missouri	Kit Bond	Republican	1972	Incumbent lost re-election. New governor elected. Democratic gain.	✓ Joseph P. Teasdale (Democratic) 50.23%; Kit Bond (Republican) 49.55%; Leon Striler (Nonpartisan) 0.22%
Montana	Thomas Lee Judge	Democratic	1972	Incumbent re-elected.	✓ Thomas Lee Judge (Democratic) 61.7%; Robert Woodahl (Republican) 36.58%; Charley Mahoney (Independent) 1.72%
New Hampshire	Meldrim Thomson Jr.	Republican	1972	Incumbent re-elected.	✓ Meldrim Thomson Jr. (Republican) 57.66%; Harry Spanos (Democratic) 42.32%
North Carolina	James Holshouser	Republican	1972	Incumbent term-limited. New governor elected. Democratic gain.	✓ Jim Hunt (Democratic) 64.99%; David Flaherty (Republican) 33.9%; Herbert F. "Chub" Seawell Jr. (American) 0.82%; Arlan Andrews (Libertarian) 0.29%
North Dakota	Arthur A. Link	Democratic-NPL	1972	Incumbent re-elected.	✓ Arthur A. Link (Democratic-NPL) 51.58%; Richard Elkin (Republican) 46.53%; Martin Vaaler (American) 1.89%
Rhode Island	Philip Noel	Democratic	1972	Incumbent retired. New governor elected. Democratic hold.	✓ J. Joseph Garrahy (Democratic) 54.82%; James Taft (Republican) 44.71%; John C. Swift (Independent) 0.32%
Utah	Cal Rampton	Democratic	1964	Incumbent retired. New governor elected. Democratic hold.	✓ Scott M. Matheson (Democratic) 52.02%; Vernon B. Romney (Republican) 45.96%; L. S. Brown (American) 1.33%; Betty Bates (Concerned Citizens) 0.69%
Vermont	Thomas P. Salmon	Democratic	1972	Incumbent retired. New governor elected. Republican gain.	✓ Richard A. Snelling (Republican) 53.39%; Stella Hackel (Democratic) 40.48%; Bernie Sanders (Liberty Union) 6.09%
Washington	Daniel J. Evans	Republican	1964	Incumbent retired. New governor elected. Democratic gain.	✓ Dixy Lee Ray (Democratic) 53.14%; John Spellman (Republican) 44.43%; Art Manning (American) 0.8%; Red Kelly (OWL Party) 0.8%; Henry Killman (Socialist Labor) 0.27%
West Virginia	Arch A. Moore Jr.	Republican	1968	Incumbent term-limited. New governor elected. Democratic gain.	✓ Jay Rockefeller (Democratic) 66.15%; Cecil H. Underwood (Republican) 33.82%

== Close states ==
States where the margin of victory was under 1%:

1. Missouri, 0.68%

States where the margin of victory was under 10%:

1. North Dakota, 5.05%
2. Utah, 6.06%
3. Washington, 8.71%

== Arkansas ==
1976 Arkansas gubernatorial election
← 1974	November 2, 1976	1978 →
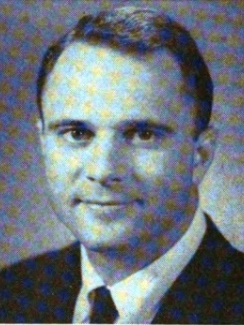

Nominee	David Pryor	Leon Griffith
Party	Democratic	Republican
Popular vote	605,083	121,716
Percentage	83.24%	16.74%
- County results Pryor: 60–70% 70–80% 80–90% >90%
Governor before election
David Pryor
Democratic
Elected Governor
David Pryor
Democratic

The 1976 Arkansas gubernatorial election was held on Tuesday November 2, Incumbent Democratic governor David Pryor defeated Republican candidate Leon Griffith with 83.24% of the vote.

== Delaware ==
1976 Delaware gubernatorial election
← 1972	November 2, 1976	1980 →
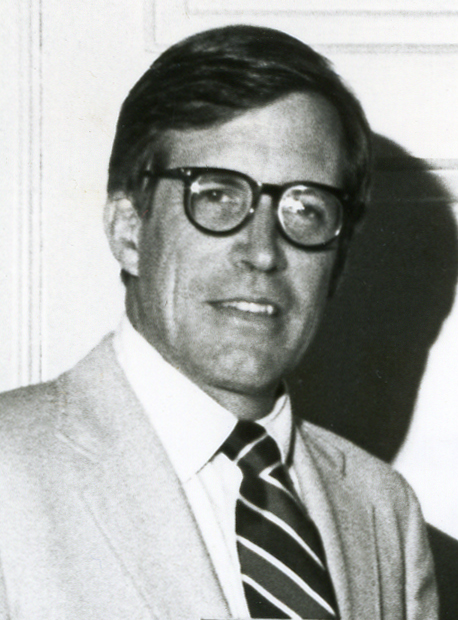

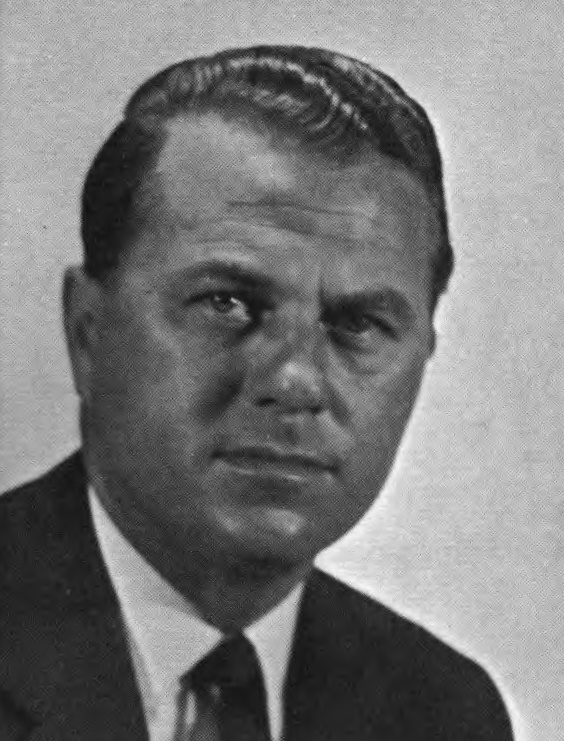
Nominee	Pete du Pont	Sherman W. Tribbitt
Party	Republican	Democratic
Popular vote	130,531	97,480
Percentage	56.86%	42.46%
- du Pont: 50–60% 60–70% 70–80% 80–90% Tribbitt: 50–60% 60–70%
Governor before election
Sherman W. Tribbitt
Democratic
Elected Governor
Pete du Pont
Republican

The 1976 Delaware gubernatorial election was held on November 2, 1976. Pitting incumbent Democratic Governor Sherman W. Tribbitt Against U.S. Representative Pete du Pont. Largely due to the state's unresolved financial problems, du Pont defeated Governor Tribbitt by a landslide margin of 57% to 42%. This is the last time that an incumbent governor of Delaware lost re-election.

== Illinois ==
1976 Illinois gubernatorial election
← 1972	November 2, 1976	1978 →
- Turnout: 74.18% ▼1.1 pp
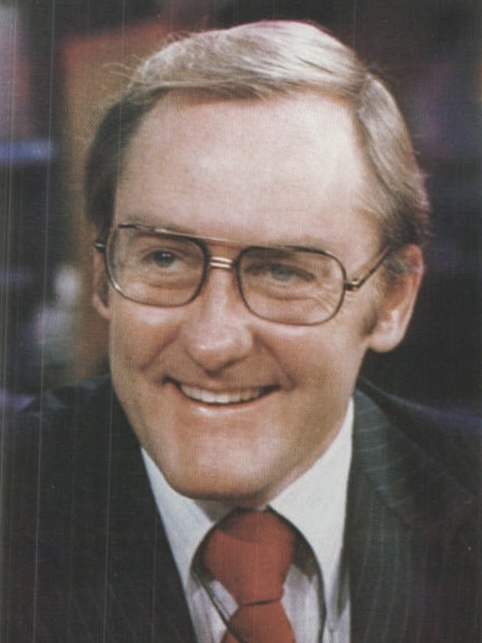

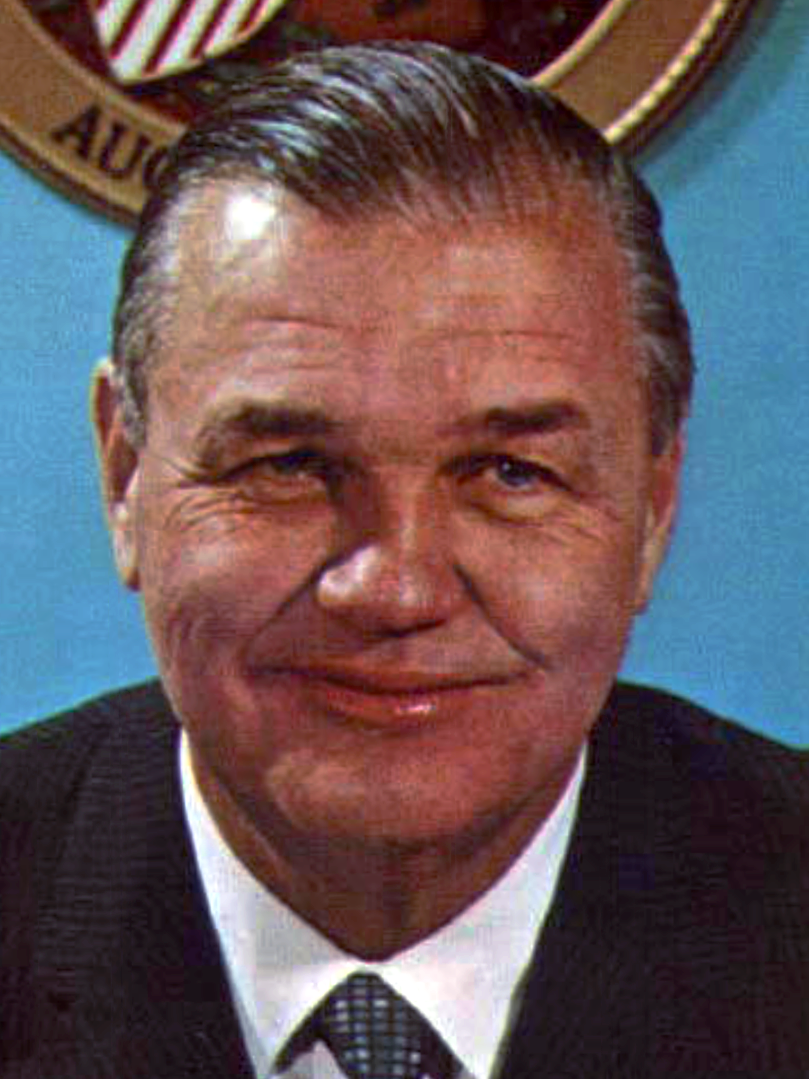
Nominee	Jim Thompson	Michael Howlett
Party	Republican	Democratic
Running mate	Dave O'Neal	Neil Hartigan
Popular vote	3,000,395	1,610,258
Percentage	64.68%	34.71%
- County results Thompson: 50-60% 60-70% 70-80% 80-90% Howlett: 50–60%
Governor before election
Dan Walker
Democratic
Elected Governor
James R. Thompson
Republican

The 1976 Illinois gubernatorial election was held in Illinois on November 2, 1976. Incumbent first-term Democratic governor Dan Walker lost renomination to Illinois Secretary of State Michael Howlett, who was an ally of Chicago mayor Richard J. Daley. Howlett then lost the general election to Republican nominee James R. Thompson. This election was the first of seven consecutive Republican gubernatorial victories in Illinois, a streak not broken until the election of Democrat Rod Blagojevich in 2002. This election is the most recent time an Illinois gubernatorial election was held concurrently with a Presidential election.

== Indiana ==
1976 Indiana gubernatorial election
← 1972	November 2, 1976	1980 →
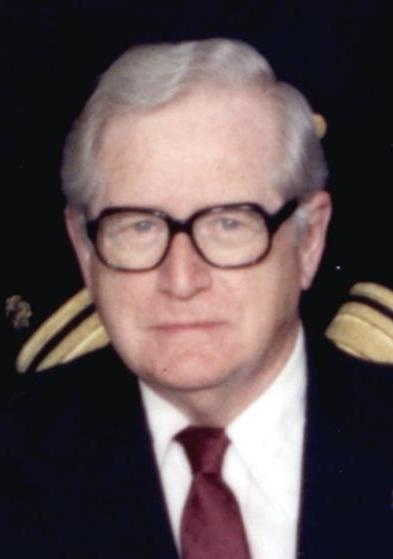

Nominee	Otis Bowen	Larry A. Conrad
Party	Republican	Democratic
Popular vote	1,236,555	927,243
Percentage	56.85%	42.63%
- County results Bowen: 40–50% 50–60% 60–70% 70–80% Conrad: 40–50% 50–60%
Governor before election
Otis Bowen
Republican
Elected Governor
Otis Bowen
Republican

The 1976 Indiana gubernatorial election was held on November 2, 1976. Incumbent Republican Governor Otis Bowen defeated Democratic nominee Larry A. Conrad with 56.85% of the vote.

== Missouri ==
1976 Missouri gubernatorial election
← 1972	November 2, 1976	1980 →
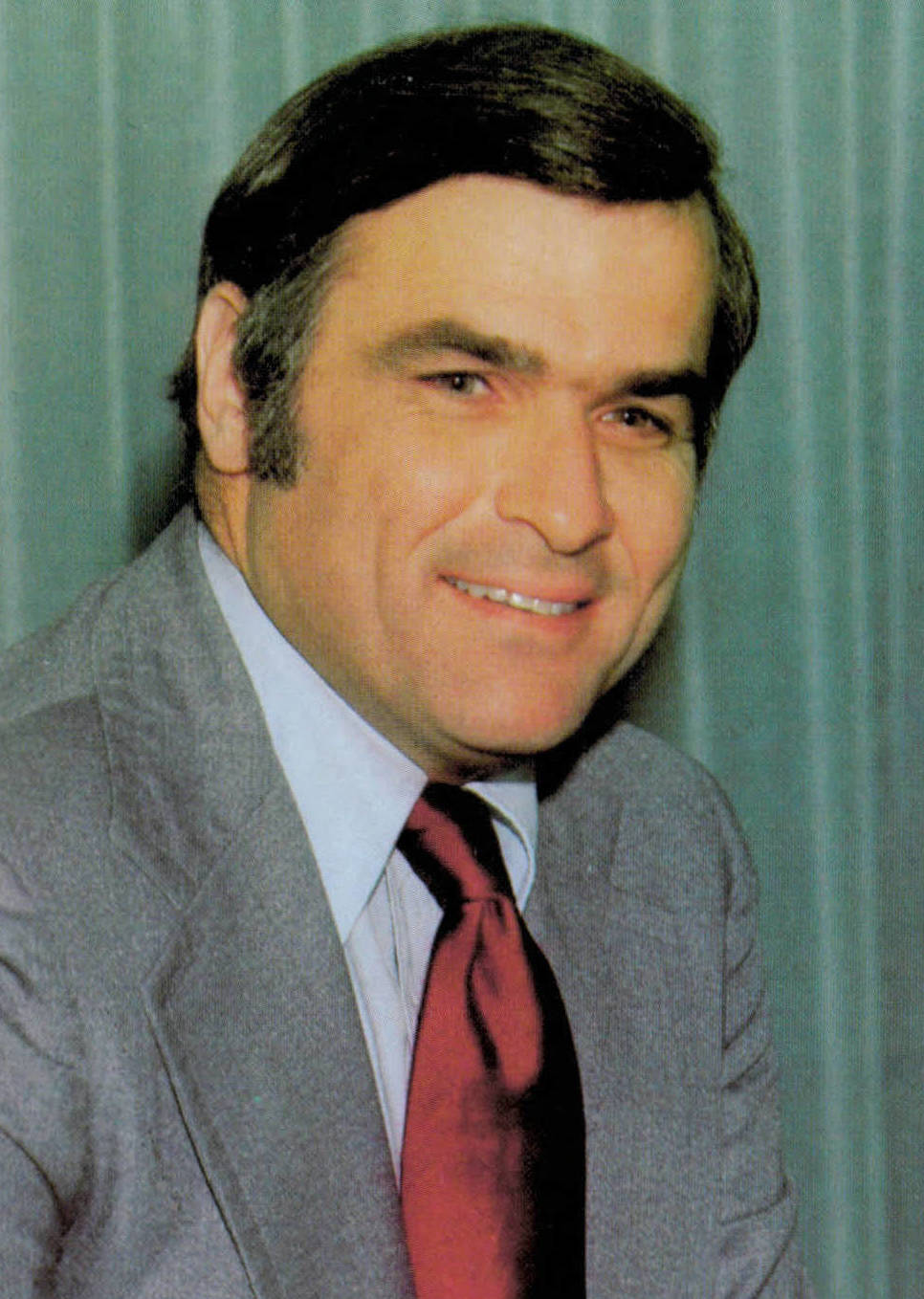

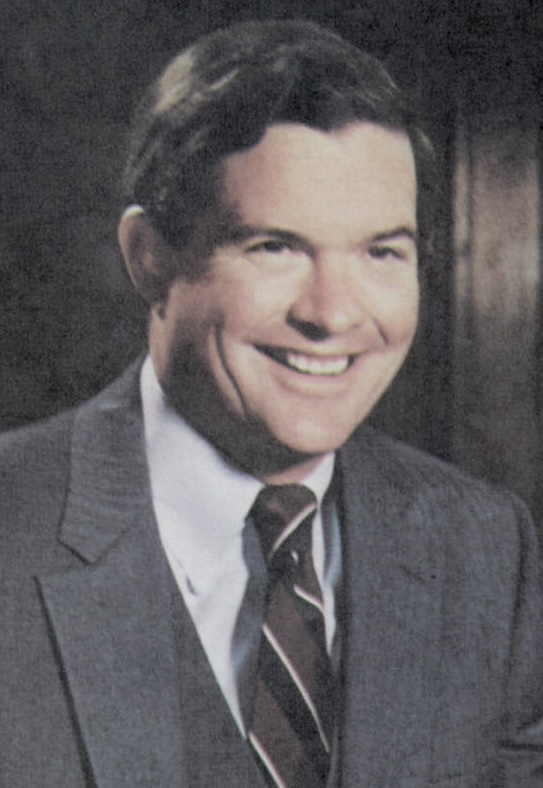
Nominee	Joseph Teasdale	Kit Bond
Party	Democratic	Republican
Popular vote	971,184	958,110
Percentage	50.2%	49.6%
- County results Teasdale: 50–60% 60–70% Bond: 50–60% 60–70%
Governor before election
Kit Bond
Republican
Elected Governor
Joseph Teasdale
Democratic

The 1976 Missouri gubernatorial election was held on November 2, 1976 and resulted in a narrow victory for the Democratic nominee, Joseph P. Teasdale, over the Republican candidate, incumbent Governor Kit Bond, and two other candidates. Teasdale defeated William J. Cason and George D. Weber for the Democratic nomination.

== Montana ==
1976 Montana gubernatorial election
← 1972	November 2, 1976	1980 →
- Turnout: 74.60%▼10.00

Nominee	Thomas Lee Judge	Bob Woodahl
Party	Democratic	Republican
Running mate	Ted Schwinden	Antoinette Fraser Rosell
Popular vote	195,420	115,848
Percentage	61.7%	36.6%
- County results Judge: 40–50% 50–60% 60–70% Woodahl: 40–50% 50–60% Mahoney: 50–60%
Governor before election
Thomas Lee Judge
Democratic
Elected Governor
Thomas Lee Judge
Democratic

The 1976 Montana gubernatorial election took place on November 2, 1976. Incumbent Governor of Montana Thomas Lee Judge, who was first elected in 1972, ran for re-election. He won the Democratic primary unopposed, and moved on to the general election, where he was opposed by Bob Woodahl, the Attorney General of Montana and the Republican nominee. Ultimately, Judge defeated Woodahl by a landslide to win his second and final term as governor.

== New Hampshire ==
1976 New Hampshire gubernatorial election
← 1974	November 2, 1976	1978 →
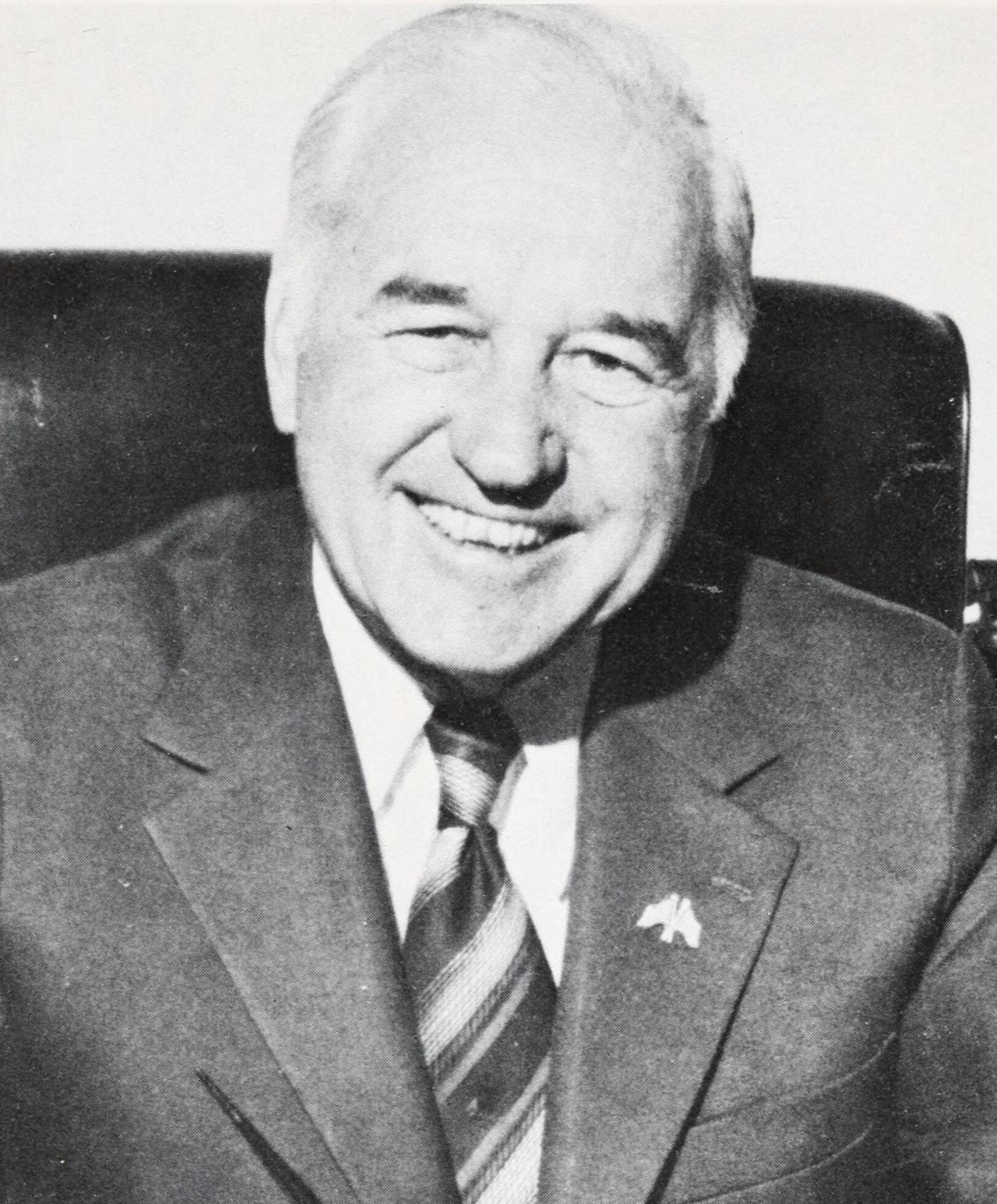

Nominee	Meldrim Thomson Jr.	Harry V. Spanos
Party	Republican	Democratic
Popular vote	197,589	145,015
Percentage	57.66%	42.32%
- Thomson: 50–60% 60–70% 70–80% 80–90% >90% Spanos: 50–60% 60–70% 70–80% 80–90% No Data/Vote
Governor before election
Meldrim Thomson Jr.
Republican
Elected Governor
Meldrim Thomson Jr.
Republican

The 1976 New Hampshire gubernatorial election was held on November 2, 1976. Incumbent Republican Governor Meldrim Thomson Jr. defeated Democratic nominee Harry V. Spanos with 57.66% of the vote.

== North Carolina ==
1976 North Carolina gubernatorial election
← 1972	November 2, 1976	1980 →
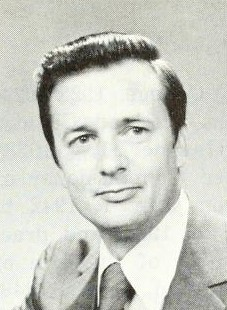

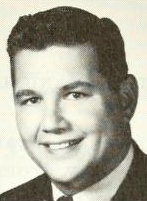
Nominee	Jim Hunt	David Flaherty
Party	Democratic	Republican
Popular vote	1,081,293	564,102
Percentage	64.99%	33.90%
- County results Hunt: 50–60% 60–70% 70–80% 80–90% >90% Flaherty: 50–60% 60–70%
Governor before election
James Holshouser
Republican
Elected Governor
Jim Hunt
Democratic

The 1976 North Carolina gubernatorial election was held on November 2, 1976. Democratic nominee Jim Hunt defeated Republican nominee David T. Flaherty with 64.99% of the vote.

== North Dakota ==
1976 North Dakota gubernatorial election
← 1972	November 2, 1976	1980 →
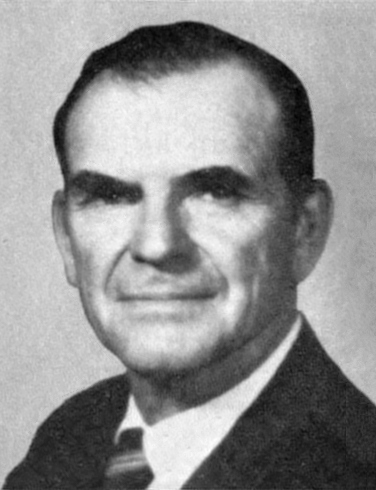

Nominee	Arthur A. Link	Richard Elkin
Party	Democratic–NPL	Republican
Running mate	Wayne Sanstead	Ernest G. Pyle
Popular vote	153,309	138,321
Percentage	51.6%	46.5%
- County results Link: 40–50% 50–60% 60–70% Elkin: 40–50% 50–60% 60–70%
Governor before election
Arthur A. Link
Democratic–NPL
Elected Governor
Arthur A. Link
Democratic–NPL

The 1976 North Dakota gubernatorial election was held on November 2, 1976. Incumbent Democratic governor Arthur A. Link Ran for a second term against Republican Richard Elkin. Link won reelection defeating Elkin 52% to 47%.

== Rhode Island ==
1976 Rhode Island gubernatorial election
← 1974	November 2, 1976	1978 →
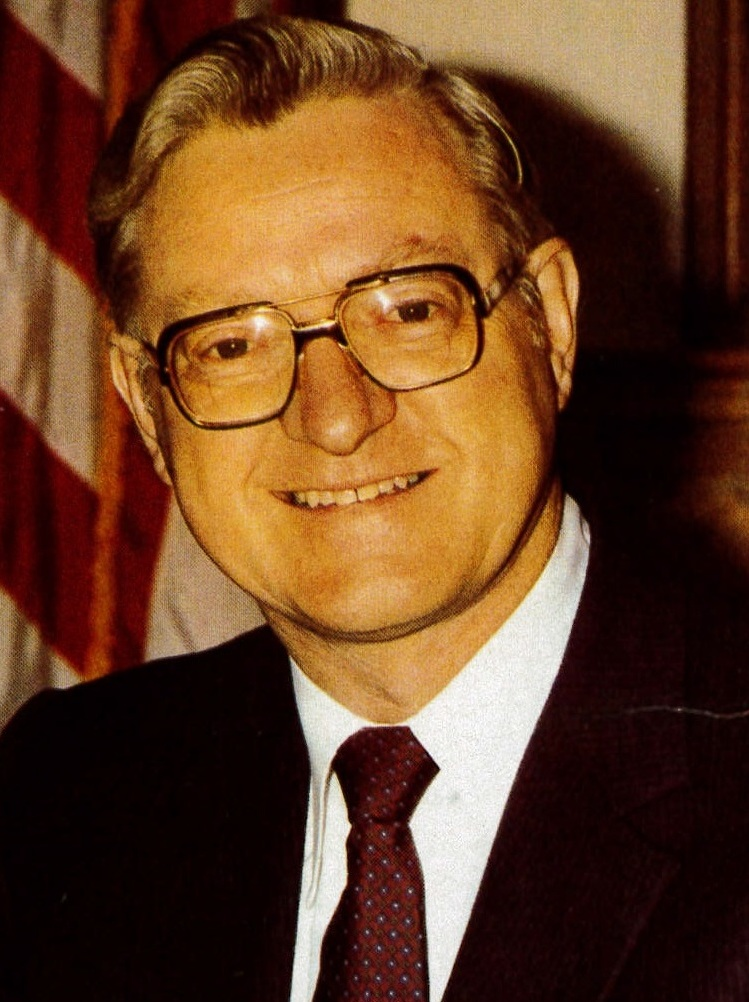

Nominee	J. Joseph Garrahy	James L. Taft Jr.
Party	Democratic	Republican
Popular vote	218,561	178,254
Percentage	54.82%	44.71%
- Garrahy: 40–50% 50–60% 60–70% Taft: 50–60% 60–70%
Governor before election
Philip Noel
Democratic
Elected Governor
J. Joseph Garrahy
Democratic

The 1976 Rhode Island gubernatorial election was held on November 2, 1976. Democratic nominee J. Joseph Garrahy defeated Republican nominee James L. Taft Jr. with 54.82% of the vote.

== Utah ==
1976 Utah gubernatorial election
← 1972	November 2, 1976	1980 →
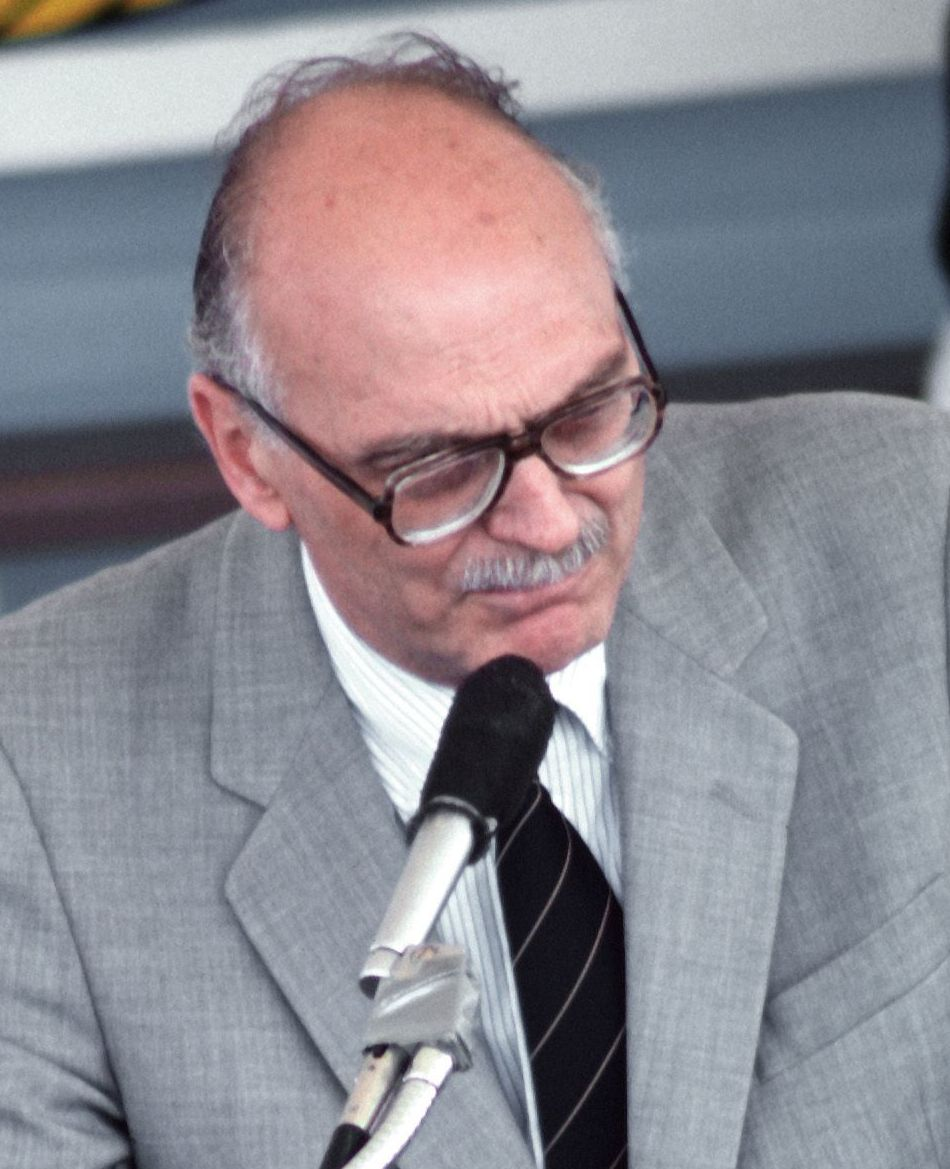

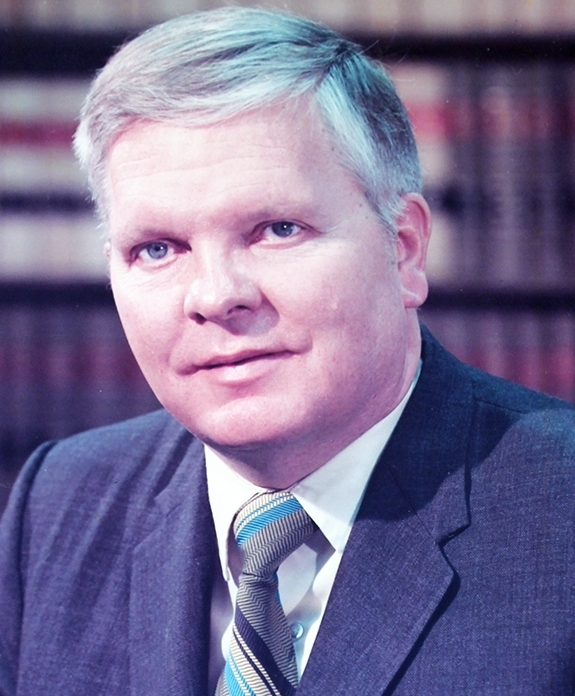
Nominee	Scott M. Matheson	Vernon B. Romney
Party	Democratic	Republican
Popular vote	280,706	248,027
Percentage	52.02%	45.96%
- County results Matheson: 50–60% 60–70% 70–80% Romney: 40–50% 50–60%
Governor before election
Cal Rampton
Democratic
Elected Governor
Scott M. Matheson
Democratic

The 1976 Utah gubernatorial election was held on November 2, 1976. Democratic candidate Scott M. Matheson defeated Republican nominee Vernon B. Romney, who had defeated Dixie L. Leavitt for his party's nomination, with 52.02% of the vote.

== Vermont ==
1976 Vermont gubernatorial election
← 1974	November 2, 1976	1978 →
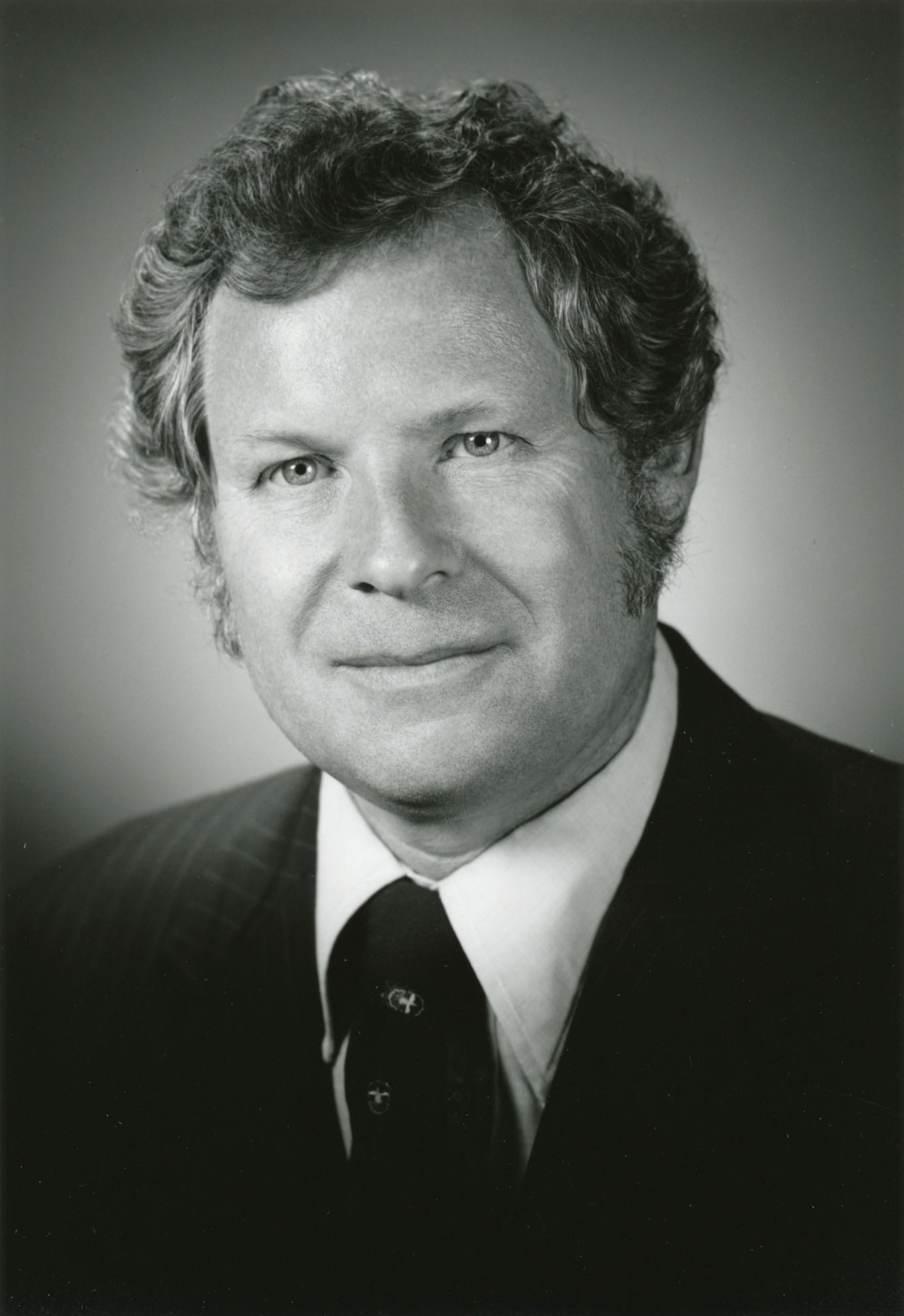

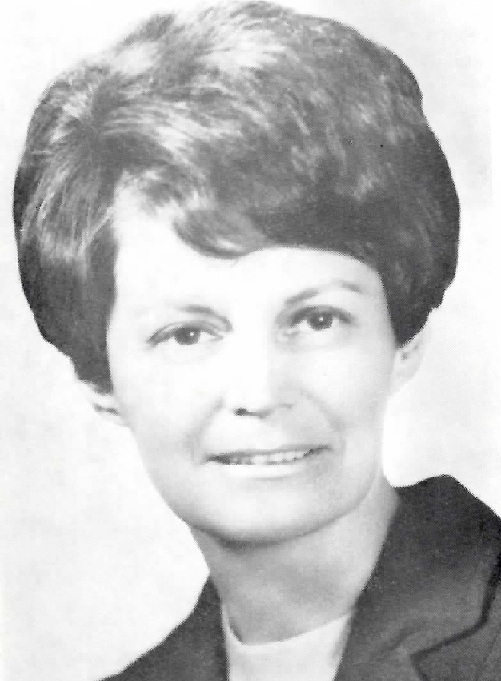

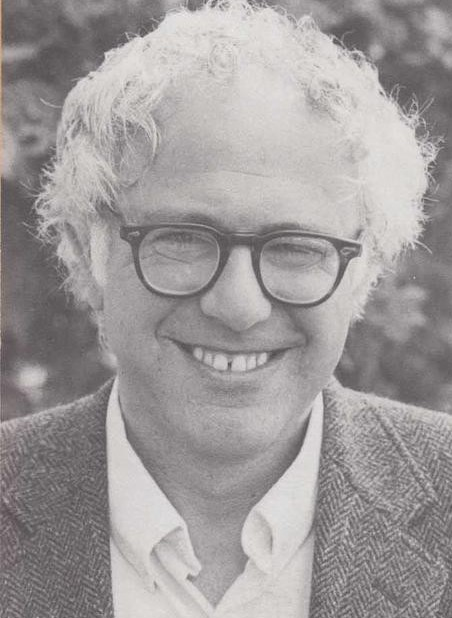
Nominee	Richard Snelling	Stella B. Hackel	Bernie Sanders
Party	Republican	Democratic	Liberty Union
Popular vote	99,268	75,262	11,317
Percentage	53.4%	40.4%	6.1%
- Snelling: 30-40% 40-50% 50-60% 60-70% 70-80% 80-90% Hackel: 40-50% 50-60% 60-70% 70-80%
Governor before election
Thomas P. Salmon
Democratic
Elected Governor
Richard Snelling
Republican

The 1976 Vermont gubernatorial election took place on November 2, 1976. Incumbent Democrat Thomas P. Salmon did not seek another term as Governor of Vermont, instead running for United States Senate. Republican candidate Richard A. Snelling won the election, defeating Democratic candidate Stella B. Hackel and Liberty Union candidate Bernie Sanders.

== Washington ==
1976 Washington gubernatorial election
← 1972	November 2, 1976	1980 →
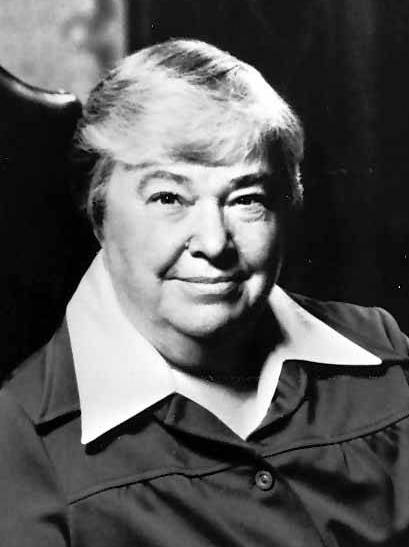

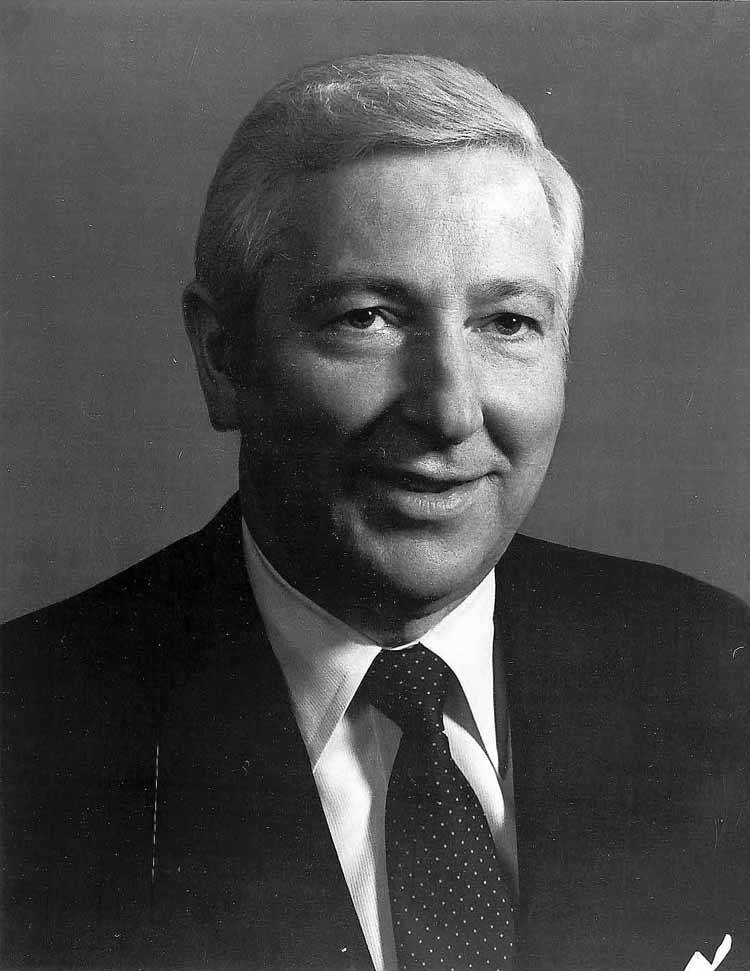
Nominee	Dixy Lee Ray	John Spellman
Party	Democratic	Republican
Popular vote	821,797	687,039
Percentage	53.14%	44.43%
- County results Ray: 40–50% 50–60% 60–70% Spellman: 40-50% 50-60% 60-70%
Governor before election
Daniel J. Evans
Republican
Elected Governor
Dixy Lee Ray
Democratic

The 1976 Washington gubernatorial election was held on November 2, 1976. This election was especially significant in that Washington elected its first female governor, Dixy Lee Ray. Wesley C. Uhlman and John Patric unsuccessfully ran in the blanket primary.

== West Virginia ==
1976 West Virginia gubernatorial election
← 1972	November 2, 1976	1980 →
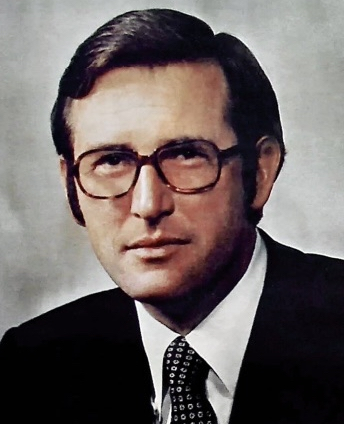

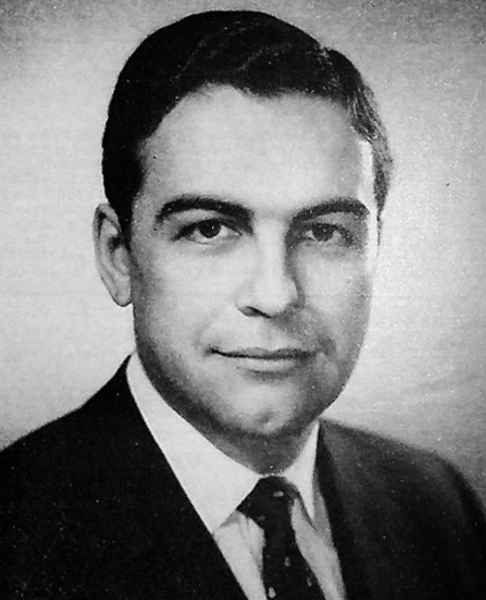
Nominee	Jay Rockefeller	Cecil H. Underwood
Party	Democratic	Republican
Popular vote	495,661	253,420
Percentage	66.15%	33.82%
- County results Rockefeller: 50–60% 60–70% 70–80% 80–90% Underwood: 50–60% 60–70%
Governor before election
Arch A. Moore, Jr.
Republican
Elected Governor
Jay Rockefeller
Democratic

The 1976 West Virginia gubernatorial election took place on November 2, 1976, to elect the governor of West Virginia. Democrat Jay Rockefeller, the nephew of the then current Vice President of the United States, Nelson Rockefeller, defeated Republican Cecil Underwood.

== See also ==
- 1976 United States elections
  - 1976 United States presidential election
  - 1976 United States Senate elections
  - 1976 United States House of Representatives elections
