= Governor Noel =

Governor Noel may refer to:

- Edmond Noel (1856–1927), 37th Governor of Mississippi
- Philip Noel (born 1931), 68th Governor of Rhode Island
