= 1976 United States elections =

- ← 1974 1975 1976 1977 1978 → Presidential election year
- Election day: November 2
- Incumbent president: ▌Gerald Ford (R)
- Next Congress: 95th

Presidential election
- Partisan control: Democratic gain
- Popular vote margin: Democratic +2.1%
- Electoral vote
- Jimmy Carter (D): 297
- Gerald Ford (R): 240
- 1976 presidential election results. Red denotes states won by Ford, blue denotes states won by Carter. Numbers indicate the electoral votes won by each candidate.

Senate elections
- Overall control: Democratic hold
- Seats contested: 34 of 100 seats
- Net seat change: Republican +1
- 1976 Senate results Democratic gain Democratic hold Republican gain Republican hold Independent hold

House elections
- Overall control: Democratic hold
- Seats contested: All 435 voting members
- Popular vote margin: Democratic +13.6%
- Net seat change: Democratic +1
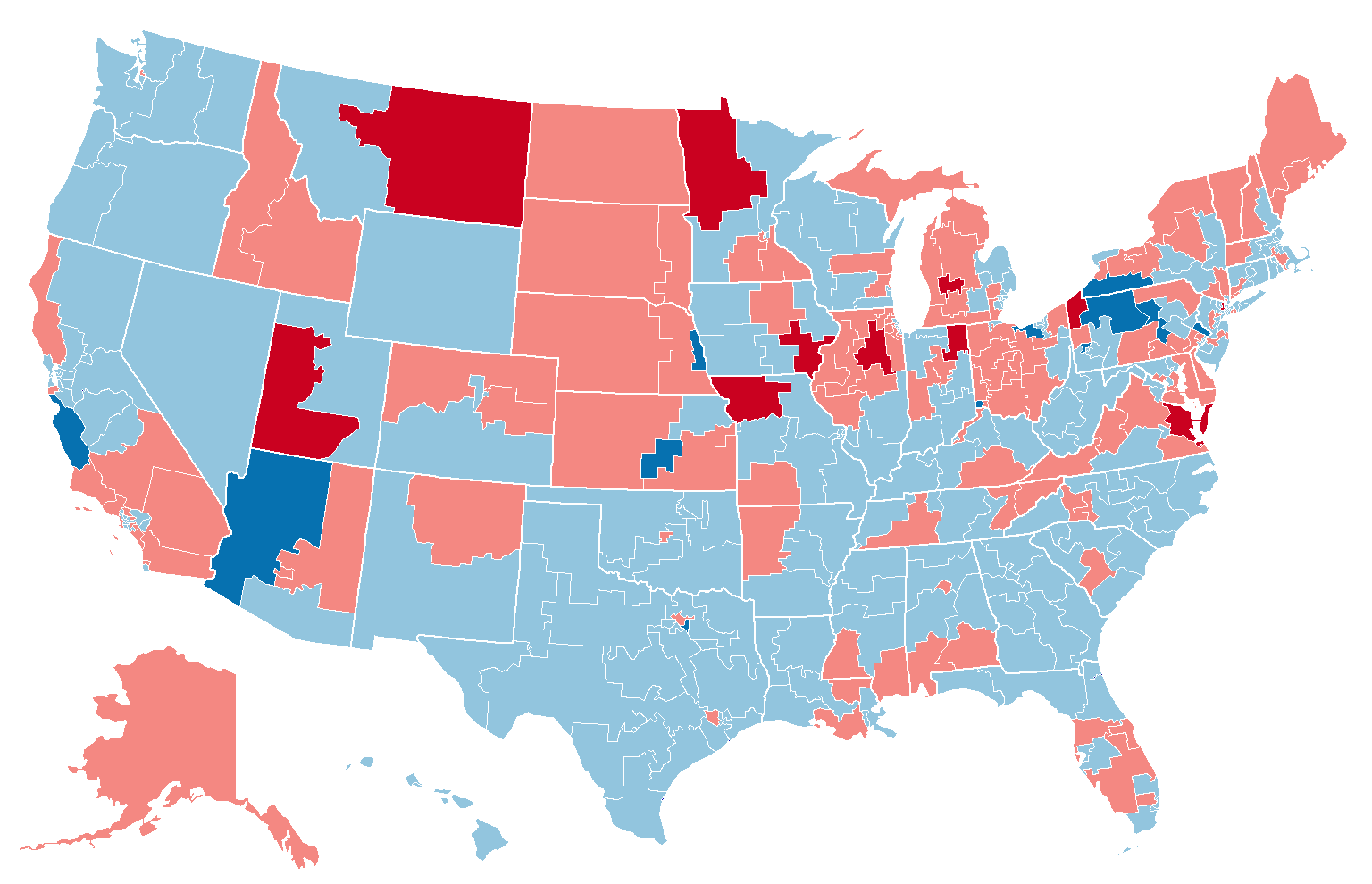
- 1976 House of Representatives results Democratic gain Democratic hold Republican gain Republican hold

Gubernatorial elections
- Seats contested: 15 (14 states, 1 territories)
- Net seat change: Democratic +1
- 1976 gubernatorial election results Territorial races not shown Democratic gain Democratic hold Republican gain Republican hold

Elections were held on November 2, 1976, and elected the members of the 95th United States Congress. The Democratic Party won the presidential election and retained control of Congress.

Former Democratic Governor Jimmy Carter of Georgia defeated Republican incumbent President Gerald Ford. Carter won the popular vote by two points and finished with 297 electoral votes, taking a mix of Southern and Northern states. Ford, who had taken office after the Watergate scandal led to the resignation of Republican President Richard Nixon in 1974, defeated former California Governor Ronald Reagan to take the Republican nomination. The convention nominated Kansas Senator Bob Dole as Ford's running mate, instead of sitting Vice President Nelson Rockefeller. Carter defeated a slew of competitors in the 1976 Democratic primaries, including California Governor Jerry Brown, Alabama Governor George Wallace, Arizona Congressman Mo Udall, Washington Senator Henry M. Jackson, and Idaho Senator Frank Church.

Neither the House nor Senate saw major changes in partisan composition, so the Democrats retained control of Congress. Democrats won the nationwide popular vote for the House of Representatives by a margin of 13.6 percentage points.

In the gubernatorial elections, the Democratic Party picked up one seat.

== See also ==
- 1976 United States presidential election
- 1976 United States House of Representatives elections
- 1976 United States Senate elections
- 1976 United States gubernatorial elections
