= Joyce Anne Noel =

American beauty pageant winner and First Lady of Rhode Island

First Lady of Rhode Island
- In role January 2, 1973 – January 4, 1977
- Governor: Philip Noel
- Preceded by: Dorothy Licht
- Succeeded by: Margherite Garrahy

Personal details
- Born: Joyce Anne Sandberg; November 28, 1932 Providence, Rhode Island, U.S.
- Died: February 13, 2019 (aged 86) Estero, Florida, U.S.
- Spouse: Philip Noel (1956–2019; her death)
- Children: 5

Joyce Anne Noel (November 28, 1932 – February 13, 2019) was an American former beauty queen who served as the First Lady of Rhode Island from 1973 to 1977. Noel, then known by her maiden name of Joyce Sandberg, was crowned Miss Rhode Island in 1953 and Miss Rhode Island USA in 1954, becoming the only woman win both state pageants to date. She later served as Rhode Island's first lady during the tenure of her husband, former Governor Philip Noel.

== Biography ==
Noel was born Joyce Anne Sandberg on November 28, 1932, in Providence, Rhode Island, to Walter and Genevieve (née Healey) Sandberg. She married Philip Noel, a lawyer, on October 20, 1956. The couple had five children - three daughters and two sons.

In 1953, Sandberg won the Miss Rhode Island pageant and participated in the Miss America 1953 pageant later that year. She was next crowned Miss Rhode Island USA in 1954 and was a contestant in the Miss USA 1954 pageant. She remains the only contestant to be crowned both Miss Rhode Island and Miss Rhode Island USA in history. Noel later served as the First Lady of Rhode Island from 1973 until 1977.

Joyce Anne Noel died in Estero, Florida, on February 13, 2019, at the age of 86. She was survived by her husband, Philip Noel, and four of her five children. She and her husband had been resident of both Warwick, Rhode Island, and Estero, Florida, during their later lives.

Awards and achievements
Preceded by Jayne Bradshaw	Miss Rhode Island; 1953	Succeeded by Virginia Gregory
Preceded by Barbara Rose Deigman	Miss Rhode Island USA; 1954	Succeeded by Beverly Jansen
