= 1974 Arkansas gubernatorial election =

- November 5, 1974
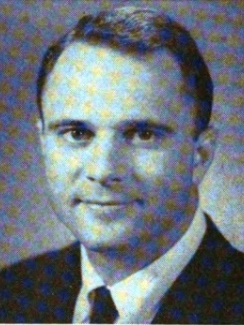

Nominee	David Pryor	Ken Coon
Party	Democratic	Republican
Popular vote	358,018	187,872
Percentage	65.57%	34.41%
- County results Pryor: 50–60% 60–70% 70–80% 80–90% Coon: 50–60%
Governor before election
Dale Bumpers
Democratic
Elected Governor
David Pryor
Democratic

The 1974 Arkansas gubernatorial election was held on November 5, 1974.

Incumbent Democratic Governor Dale Bumpers retired to run for the U.S. Senate.

Democratic nominee David Pryor defeated Republican nominee Ken Coon with 65.57% of the vote.

== Primary elections ==
Primary elections were held on May 28, 1974.

=== Democratic primary ===
==== Candidates ====
- Orval E. Faubus, former governor
- David Pryor, former U.S. representative for the 4th district
- Bob C. Riley, incumbent lieutenant governor

==== Results ====
Democratic primary results
Party	Candidate	Votes	%
Democratic	David Pryor	297,673	51.03
Democratic	Orval E. Faubus	193,105	33.10
Democratic	Bob C. Riley	92,612	15.88
Total votes		583,390	100.00

=== Republican primary ===
==== Candidates ====
- Ken Coon, executive director of the Republican Party of Arkansas
- Joseph H. Weston, editor of the Sharp Citizen

==== Results ====
Republican primary results
Party	Candidate	Votes	%
Republican	Ken Coon	3,698	81.94
Republican	Joseph H. Weston	815	18.06
Total votes		4,513	100.00

== General election ==
=== Candidates ===
- Ken Coon, Republican
- David Pryor, Democratic

=== Results ===
1974 Arkansas gubernatorial election
Party	Candidate	Votes	%	±%
Democratic	David Pryor	358,018	65.57%	−9.87%
Republican	Ken Coon	187,872	34.41%	+9.85%
Write-in	Joseph H. Weston	84	0.02%	
Majority		170,146	31.16%	
Turnout		545,974	100.00%	
Democratic hold		Swing		

== Bibliography ==
- Glashan, Roy R. (1979). American Governors and Gubernatorial Elections, 1775-1978. Meckler Books. ISBN 0-930466-17-9.
- Gubernatorial Elections, 1787-1997. Washington, D.C.: Congressional Quarterly Inc. 1998. ISBN 1-56802-396-0.
- Scammon, Richard M., ed. (1975). America Votes 11: a handbook of contemporary American election statistics, 1974. Washington, D.C.: Elections Research Center.
