= 1974 Rhode Island gubernatorial election =

- November 5, 1974
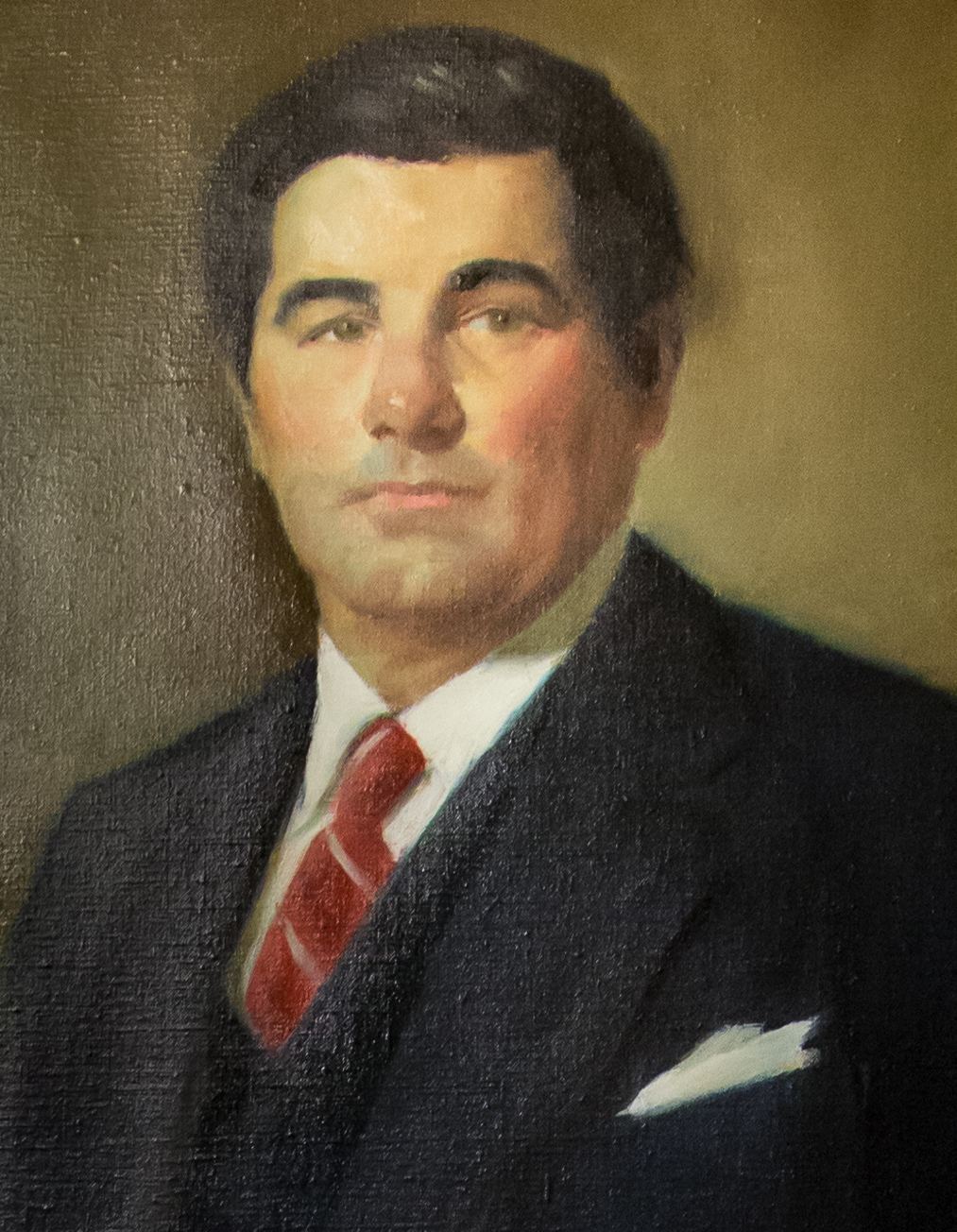

Nominee	Philip Noel	James W. Nugent
Party	Democratic	Republican
Popular vote	252,436	69,224
Percentage	78.48%	21.52%
- Noel: 60–70% 70–80% 80–90%
Governor before election
Philip Noel
Democratic
Elected Governor
Philip Noel
Democratic

The 1974 Rhode Island gubernatorial election was held on November 5, 1974. Incumbent Democrat Philip Noel defeated Republican nominee James W. Nugent with 78.48% of the vote.

== General election ==
=== Candidates ===
- Philip Noel, Democratic
- James W. Nugent, Republican

=== Results ===
1974 Rhode Island gubernatorial election
Party	Candidate	Votes	%	±%
Democratic	Philip Noel (incumbent)	252,436	78.48%	
Republican	James W. Nugent	69,224	21.52%	
Majority		183,212		
Turnout		321,660		
Democratic hold		Swing		

==== By county ====
	Phillip Noel Democratic		James Nugent Republican	
County	Votes	%	Votes	%
Bristol	13,083	75.8%	4,166	24.2%
Kent	42,917	77.3%	12,581	22.7%
Newport	17,696	77.0%	5,289	23.0%
Providence	160,219	80.2%	39,518	19.8%
Washington	18,521	70.7%	7,670	29.3%

Counties that flipped from Republican to Democratic

- Washington
