= Philip Noel =

American politician and lawyer (born 1931)

Phil Noel
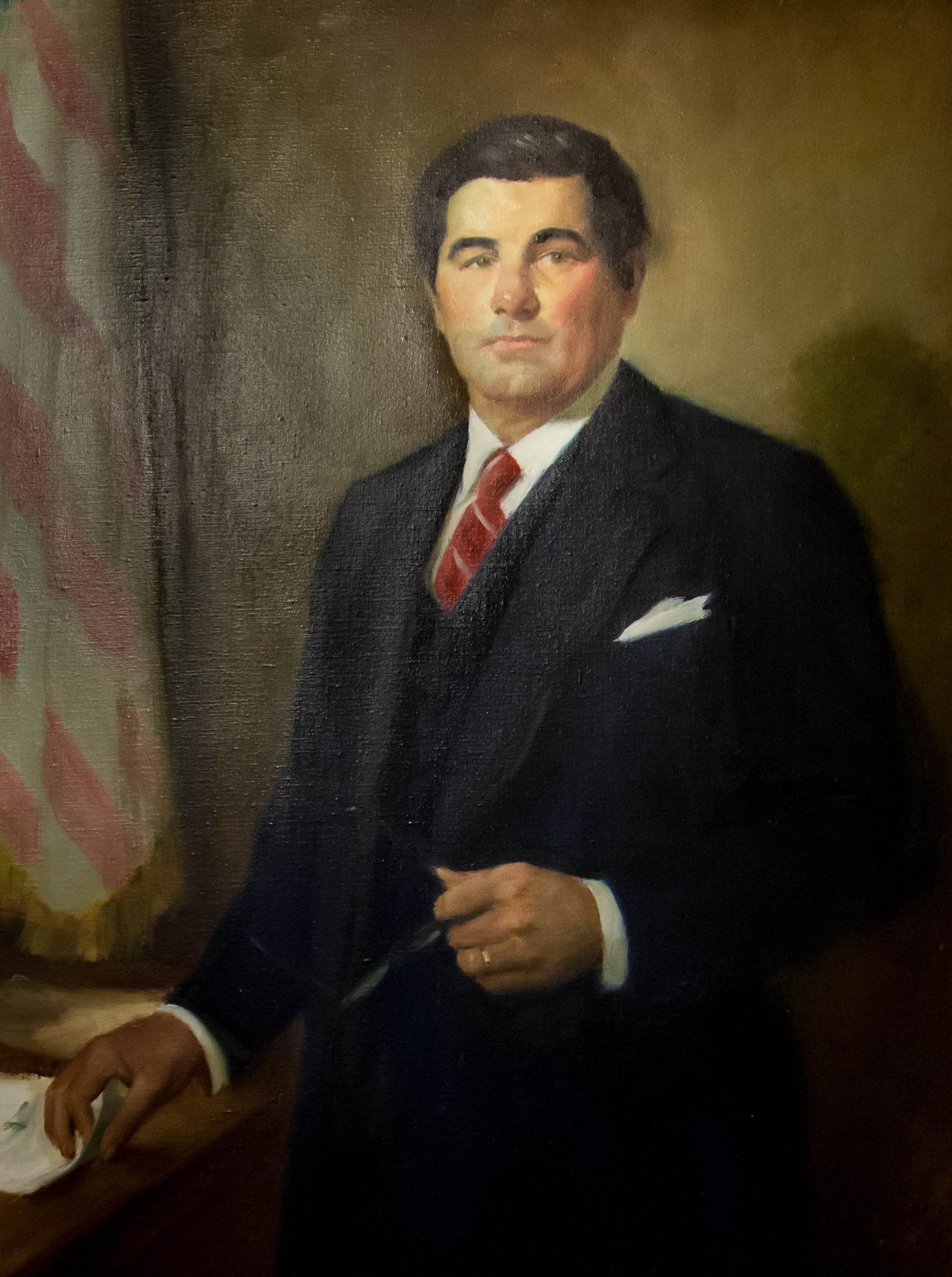

68th Governor of Rhode Island
- In office January 2, 1973 – January 4, 1977
- Lieutenant: J. Joseph Garrahy
- Preceded by: Frank Licht
- Succeeded by: J. Joseph Garrahy

Mayor of Warwick
- In office 1967–1973
- Preceded by: Horace Hobbs
- Succeeded by: Eugene McCaffrey

Personal details
- Born: Philip William Noel; June 6, 1931 (age 95) Warwick, Rhode Island, U.S.
- Party: Democratic
- Spouse: Joyce Sandberg (m. 1956; died 2019)
- Children: 5
- Education: Brown University (BA); Georgetown University (JD)

Philip William Noel (born June 6, 1931) is an American politician and lawyer who served as the 68th governor of Rhode Island. He was elected in 1972, and re-elected in 1974.

Since the death of Edward D. DiPrete in 2025, he is the last surviving governor of Rhode Island to have served in the 20th century.

== Personal life ==
Philip Noel was born in Warwick, Rhode Island. His parents were Joe Noel, an auto mechanic, and Emma Crudeli Noel, a jewelry worker. He attended public schools in Warwick. He was a class president at Samuel Gorton High School, and was named to Rhode Island's All-State football team during his time there.

Noel took his first job at age 15, working as a commercial fisherman. Noel later accepted a football scholarship to Georgetown University. He transferred to Brown University when Georgetown dropped its football program. He received a degree in Economics from Brown in 1954, then returned to Georgetown University to study Law, with the goal of joining the FBI. While still in school, he obtained a job from Democratic Rhode Island Senator John O. Pastore as a mailman for the United States Senate Post Office.

After receiving his J.D. degree, Noel began his professional career as a solo practitioner, with law offices in Providence and Warwick.

Noel married Joyce Anne Sandberg on October 20, 1956. Sandberg was Miss Rhode Island for 1953 and participated in the 1953 Miss America pageant. She was also Miss Rhode Island USA for 1954 and participated in the 1954 Miss USA pageant. They had five children.

== Political career ==
Encouraged by Senator Pastore, Noel ran for the Warwick city council in 1958. He lost his first campaign, but was elected in 1960, and served three terms. In 1966 he was elected Mayor of Warwick, serving from 1967 to 1973 (three terms). In 1972 he mounted a successful campaign to become Governor of Rhode Island. Senator Pastore announced his retirement from the Senate in late 1975. In January 1976, Noel announced a bid for the Democratic nomination to succeed Pastore.

As governor, Noel sponsored legislation creating the Rhode Island Port Authority with power to take control over Quonset Point, Davisville, and other relinquished U.S. military property. He established the Rhode Island Department of Economic Development. He sponsored legislation which established the Rhode Island Housing and Mortgage Finance Corporation (RIHMFC).

Noel was tasked by President Nixon to travel to China on a diplomatic mission. President Ford appointed Noel to the US Commission on Intergovernmental Relations.

In 1976 Noel was the acting chairman of the Platform Committee for that year's Democratic National Convention. He was also the chairman of the Democratic Governors' Conference.

After an unsuccessful bid for a U.S. Senate seat in 1976, Phil resumed the practice of law in Providence and Washington, became a successful real estate developer, and founded several start-up companies in the petroleum industry, most of them based in Louisiana. In his sunset years, Noel remained active in various business enterprises including a Warwick marina and country club.

== Controversy ==
In early 1976 Noel was criticized for remarks he made characterizing the conditions of poverty in a "black ghetto". In May he stepped down as chair of the Democratic National Convention's Platform Committee as a response to the controversy over his remarks. Later the same month, he survived a helicopter crash on the University of Rhode Island campus. Noel narrowly lost the September primary election to automobile dealer Richard Lorber. Lorber lost the general election to former United States Secretary of the Navy John Chafee.

== Post-political life ==
After he completed his term as governor, Noel returned to his law practice.

Noel and his wife lived in semi-retirement in Estero, Florida. He no longer takes clients, but still does legal work for his family's various companies, including commercial real estate and a rice farm in Louisiana. Noel spends about half the year in Florida and half in Warwick, where he owns a marina and country club. He has three great-grandchildren.

In 2011, Noel was inducted into the Rhode Island Heritage Hall of Fame.

His wife, former Rhode Island First Lady Joyce Anne Noel, died on February 13, 2019.

== See also ==
- List of mayors of Warwick, Rhode Island

Party political offices
Preceded by Frank Licht	Democratic nominee for Governor of Rhode Island; 1972, 1974	Succeeded by J. Joseph Garrahy
Preceded by Wendell R. Anderson	Chair of the Democratic Governors Association; 1975–1976	Succeeded by Reubin Askew
Political offices
Preceded by Frank Licht	Governor of Rhode Island; 1973–1977	Succeeded by J. Joseph Garrahy
U.S. order of precedence (ceremonial)
Preceded by Martha McSally as Former U.S. Senator	Order of precedence of the United States; Within Rhode Island	Succeeded by Donald Carcieri as Former Governor
Preceded by Roy Cooper as Former Governor	Order of precedence of the United States; Outside Rhode Island	Succeeded by Donald Carcieri as Former Governor
