= 1982 Ohio Attorney General election =

- November 2, 1982
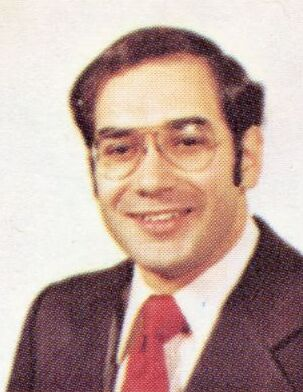

Nominee	Anthony J. Celebrezze Jr.	Charles R. Saxbe
Party	Democratic	Republican
Popular vote	2,036,243	1,203,797
Percentage	61.3%	36.24%
- County results Celebrezze: 40–50% 50–60% 60–70% 70–80% Saxbe: 40–50% 50–60% 60–70%
Attorney General before election
William J. Brown
Democratic
Elected Attorney General
Anthony J. Celebrezze Jr.
Democratic

The 1982 Ohio Attorney General election was held on November 2, 1982, to elect the Ohio Attorney General. Democratic nominee, Ohio Secretary of State Anthony J. Celebrezze Jr., defeated Republican Ohio House Representative Charles R. Saxbe in a landslide, winning by a nearly 2 to 1 margin.

== Background ==
The longtime Democratic incumbent Ohio Attorney General William J. Brown chose not to run for re-election in order to seek the Democratic nomination for Governor of Ohio, which he would go on to lose to Dick Celeste.

== Democratic primary ==
=== Candidates ===
- Anthony J. Celebrezze Jr., Ohio Secretary of State (1979–1983)

=== Campaign ===
The Democratic primary was held on June 8, 1982. Celebrezze won the Democratic nomination without opposition.

=== Results ===
Democratic primary results
Party	Candidate	Votes	%
Democratic	Anthony J. Celebrezze Jr.	750,315	100%
Total votes		750,315	100%

== Republican primary ==
=== Candidates ===
- Charles R. Saxbe, Ohio House Representative, (1975–1982)

=== Campaign ===
The Republican primary was held on June 8, 1982. Saxbe won the Republican nomination unanimously.

=== Results ===
Republican primary results
Party	Candidate	Votes	%
Republican	Charles R. Saxbe	572,238	100%
Total votes		572,238	100%

== General election ==
=== Candidates ===
- Anthony J. Celebrezze Jr., Ohio Secretary of State (1979–1983) (Democratic)
- Charles R. Saxbe, Ohio House Representative, (1975–1982)
- James L. Schuller (Libertarian)

=== Results ===
1982 Ohio Attorney General results
Party	Candidate	Votes	%	±%
Democratic	Anthony J. Celebrezze Jr.	2,036,243	61.3%	−2.42%
Republican	Charles R. Saxbe	1,203,797	36.24%	−0.04%
Libertarian	James L. Schuller	81,974	2.47%	N/A
Total votes		3,322,014	100.00%	
Democratic hold				
