= 2006 Ohio Attorney General election =

- November 7, 2006
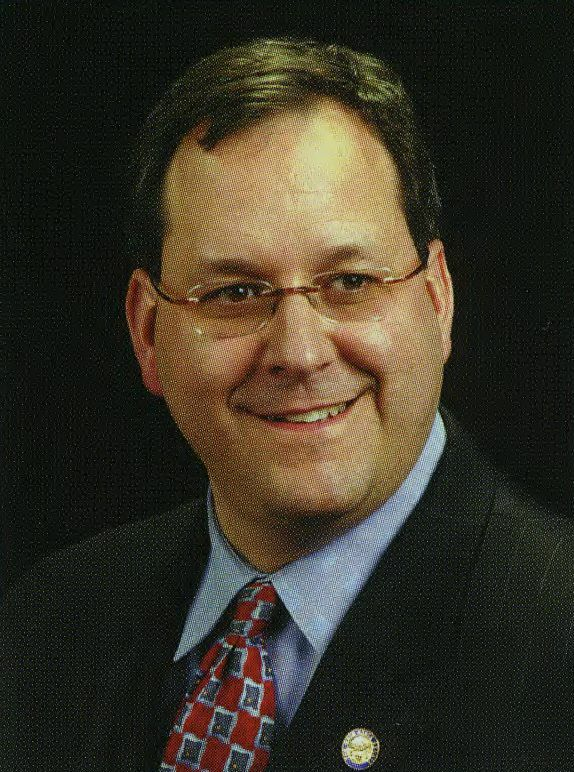

Nominee	Marc Dann	Betty Montgomery
Party	Democratic	Republican
Popular vote	2,035,825	1,833,846
Percentage	52.61%	47.39%
- County results Dann: 50–60% 60–70% 70–80% Montgomery: 50–60% 60–70%
Attorney General before election
Jim Petro
Republican
Elected Attorney General
Marc Dann
Democratic

The 2006 Ohio Attorney General election was held on November 7, 2006, to elect the Ohio Attorney General. Democratic state senator and attorney Marc Dann defeated Republican State Auditor and former attorney general Betty Montgomery with 52.61% of the vote in what was considered an upset. The election was held concurrently with a U.S. Senate election, gubernatorial election, and other statewide races. Primary elections were held on May 2, 2006.

Dann would go on to resign as attorney general on May 14, 2008, following the discovery of an extramarital affair and claims of sexual harassment. Dean was succeeded by Nancy H. Rogers in late May 2008 after being appointed by Governor Ted Strickland, but did not seek a full term in the following special election.

== Republican primary ==
=== Nominee ===
- Betty Montgomery, Ohio State Auditor (2003-2007) and former attorney general (1995-2003)

=== Defeated in primary ===
- Tim Grendell, state senator from the 18th district (2005-2011) and former state representative from the 98th district (2001-2005)

=== Withdrew ===
- Ron O'Brien, Franklin County Prosecutor (1997-2021)

=== Results ===
Republican primary results
Party	Candidate	Votes	%
Republican	Betty Montgomery	583,845	73.36%
Republican	Tim Grendell	212,064	26.64%
Total votes		795,909	100.0%

== Democratic primary ==
=== Nominee ===
- Marc Dann, state senator from the 32nd district (2003-2006)

=== Defeated in primary ===
- Subodh Chandra, attorney and prosecutor

=== Results ===
Democratic primary results
Party	Candidate	Votes	%
Democratic	Marc Dann	492,799	70.95%
Democratic	Subodh Chandra	201,738	29.05%
Total votes		694,537	100.0%

== General election ==
=== Results ===
Ohio Attorney General election, 2006
Party	Candidate	Votes	%	±%
Democratic	Marc Dann	2,035,825	52.61%	+16.73%
Republican	Betty Montgomery	1,833,846	47.39%	−16.73%
Total votes		3,869,671	100.0%	
Democratic gain from Republican				

==== By county ====
2006 Ohio Attorney General election (by county)
County	Marc Dann Democratic		Betty Montgomery Republican		Margin		Total votes cast
County	#	%	#	%	#	%	Total votes cast
Adams	3,380	43.97%	4,307	56.03%	-927	-12.06%	7,687
Allen	15,522	42.63%	20,887	57.37%	-5,365	-14.74%	36,409
Ashland	8,689	47.42%	9,637	52.58%	-948	-5.06%	18,326
Ashtabula	20,960	61.71%	13,004	38.29%	7,956	23.42%	33,964
Athens	13,051	67.09%	6,404	32.91%	6,647	34.18%	19,455
Auglaize	6,704	40.36%	9,907	59.64%	-3,203	-19.28%	16,611
Belmont	15,473	67.60%	7,415	32.40%	8,058	35.20%	22,888
Brown	6,610	47.87%	7,198	52.13%	-588	-4.26%	13,808
Butler	43,089	40.91%	62,247	59.09%	-19,158	-18.18%	105,336
Carroll	5,485	56.02%	4,307	43.98%	1,178	12.04%	9,792
Champaign	6,064	42.97%	8,048	57.03%	-1,984	-14.06%	14,112
Clark	24,471	50.36%	24,125	49.64%	346	0.72%	48,596
Clermont	24,112	37.34%	40,460	62.66%	-16,348	-25.32%	64,572
Clinton	5,197	41.38%	7,361	58.62%	-2,164	-17.24%	12,558
Columbiana	22,012	60.55%	14,342	39.45%	7,670	21.10%	36,354
Coshocton	6,560	49.83%	6,604	50.17%	-44	-0.34%	13,164
Crawford	7,815	47.77%	8,546	52.23%	-731	-4.46%	16,361
Cuyahoga	260,645	64.38%	144,202	35.62%	116,443	28.76%	404,847
Darke	7,512	41.75%	10,479	58.25%	-2,967	-16.50%	17,991
Defiance	6,759	50.58%	6,604	49.42%	155	1.16%	13,363
Delaware	23,394	36.52%	40,669	63.48%	-17,275	-26.96%	64,063
Erie	17,794	59.22%	12,252	40.78%	5,542	18.44%	30,046
Fairfield	22,424	42.34%	30,538	57.66%	-8,114	-15.32%	52,962
Franklin	187,191	51.07%	179,370	48.93%	7,821	2.14%	366,561
Fulton	7,607	47.87%	8,283	52.13%	-676	-4.26%	15,890
Gallia	4,181	42.73%	5,604	57.27%	-1,423	-14.54%	9,785
Geauga	18,361	47.14%	20,587	52.86%	-2,226	-5.72%	38,948
Greene	23,347	40.67%	34,054	59.33%	-10,707	-18.66%	57,401
Guernsey	6,837	52.55%	6,174	47.45%	663	5.10%	13,011
Hamilton	133,075	47.24%	148,647	52.76%	-15,572	-5.52%	281,722
Hancock	10,077	40.86%	14,584	59.14%	-4,507	-18.28%	24,661
Hardin	4,405	46.93%	4,981	53.07%	-576	-6.14%	9,386
Harrison	3,479	59.39%	2,379	40.61%	1,100	18.78%	5,858
Henry	5,157	46.30%	5,982	53.70%	-825	-7.40%	11,139
Highland	5,589	44.80%	6,886	55.20%	-1,297	-10.40%	12,475
Hocking	5,190	54.03%	4,414	45.97%	776	8.06%	9,604
Holmes	2,811	36.44%	4,902	63.56%	-2,091	-27.12%	7,713
Huron	9,647	53.95%	8,236	46.05%	1,411	7.90%	17,883
Jackson	4,366	46.80%	4,963	53.20%	-597	-6.40%	9,329
Jefferson	16,006	64.47%	8,821	35.53%	7,185	28.94%	24,827
Knox	8,648	42.03%	11,927	57.97%	-3,279	-15.94%	20,575
Lake	46,319	53.26%	40,646	46.74%	5,673	6.52%	86,965
Lawrence	9,546	53.80%	8,196	46.20%	1,350	7.60%	17,742
Licking	25,559	43.85%	32,727	56.15%	-7,168	-12.30%	58,286
Logan	6,306	39.41%	9,697	60.59%	-3,391	-21.18%	16,003
Lorain	58,880	59.76%	39,642	40.24%	19,238	19.52%	98,522
Lucas	82,729	64.05%	46,441	35.95%	36,288	28.10%	129,170
Madison	4,972	36.95%	8,484	63.05%	-3,512	-26.10%	13,456
Mahoning	69,034	74.27%	23,916	25.73%	45,118	48.54%	92,950
Marion	9,947	46.97%	11,233	53.03%	-1,286	-6.06%	21,180
Medina	31,768	50.09%	31,652	49.91%	116	0.18%	63,420
Meigs	3,591	47.67%	3,942	52.33%	-351	-4.66%	7,533
Mercer	5,488	36.69%	9,470	63.31%	-3,982	-26.62%	14,958
Miami	14,064	41.62%	19,728	58.38%	-5,664	-16.76%	33,792
Monroe	4,029	69.24%	1,790	30.76%	2,239	38.48%	5,819
Montgomery	88,537	49.47%	90,421	50.53%	-1,884	-1.06%	178,958
Morgan	2,487	49.16%	2,572	50.84%	-85	-1.68%	5,059
Morrow	5,340	43.81%	6,850	56.19%	-1,510	-12.38%	12,190
Muskingum	13,935	49.79%	14,050	50.21%	-115	-0.42%	27,985
Noble	2,458	48.96%	2,563	51.04%	-105	-2.08%	5,021
Ottawa	9,741	55.63%	7,768	44.37%	1,973	11.26%	17,509
Paulding	3,457	46.95%	3,906	53.05%	-449	-6.10%	7,363
Perry	6,220	56.43%	4,803	43.57%	1,417	12.86%	11,023
Pickaway	7,736	43.61%	10,005	56.39%	-2,269	-12.78%	17,741
Pike	4,938	58.72%	3,471	41.28%	1,467	17.44%	8,409
Portage	31,625	58.92%	22,048	41.08%	9,577	17.84%	53,673
Preble	6,714	43.45%	8,738	56.55%	-2,024	-13.10%	15,452
Putnam	5,975	42.99%	7,924	57.01%	-1,949	-14.02%	13,899
Richland	22,657	50.81%	21,931	49.19%	726	1.62%	44,588
Scioto	11,832	50.74%	11,487	49.26%	345	1.48%	23,319
Sandusky	11,680	53.86%	10,005	46.14%	1,675	7.72%	21,685
Scioto	14,342	56.21%	11,173	43.79%	3,169	12.42%	25,515
Seneca	10,943	54.73%	9,053	45.27%	1,890	9.46%	19,996
Shelby	6,646	41.02%	9,556	58.98%	-2,910	-17.96%	16,202
Stark	75,584	55.17%	61,424	44.83%	14,160	10.34%	137,008
Summit	114,859	58.82%	80,427	41.18%	34,432	17.64%	195,286
Trumbull	58,913	74.86%	19,783	25.24%	39,130	49.62%	78,696
Tuscarawas	16,441	54.41%	13,776	45.59%	2,665	8.82%	30,217
Union	5,890	35.19%	10,849	64.81%	-4,959	-29.62%	16,739
Van Wert	3,958	38.50%	6,323	61.50%	-2,365	-23.00%	10,281
Vinton	2,212	50.84%	2,139	49.16%	73	1.68%	4,351
Warren	24,122	35.53%	43,773	64.47%	-19,651	-28.94%	67,895
Washington	10,542	48.43%	11,227	51.57%	-685	-3.14%	21,769
Wayne	16,915	45.60%	20,178	54.40%	-3,263	-8.80%	37,093
Williams	6,477	50.38%	6,380	49.62%	97	0.76%	12,857
Wood	23,401	51.47%	22,065	48.53%	1,336	2.94%	45,466
Wyandot	3,858	47.87%	4,201	52.13%	-343	-4.26%	8,059
Totals	2,035,825	52.61%	1,833,846	47.39%	201,979	5.22%	3,869,671

== See also ==
- 2006 United States elections
