= 2002 Ohio Attorney General election =

- November 5, 2002
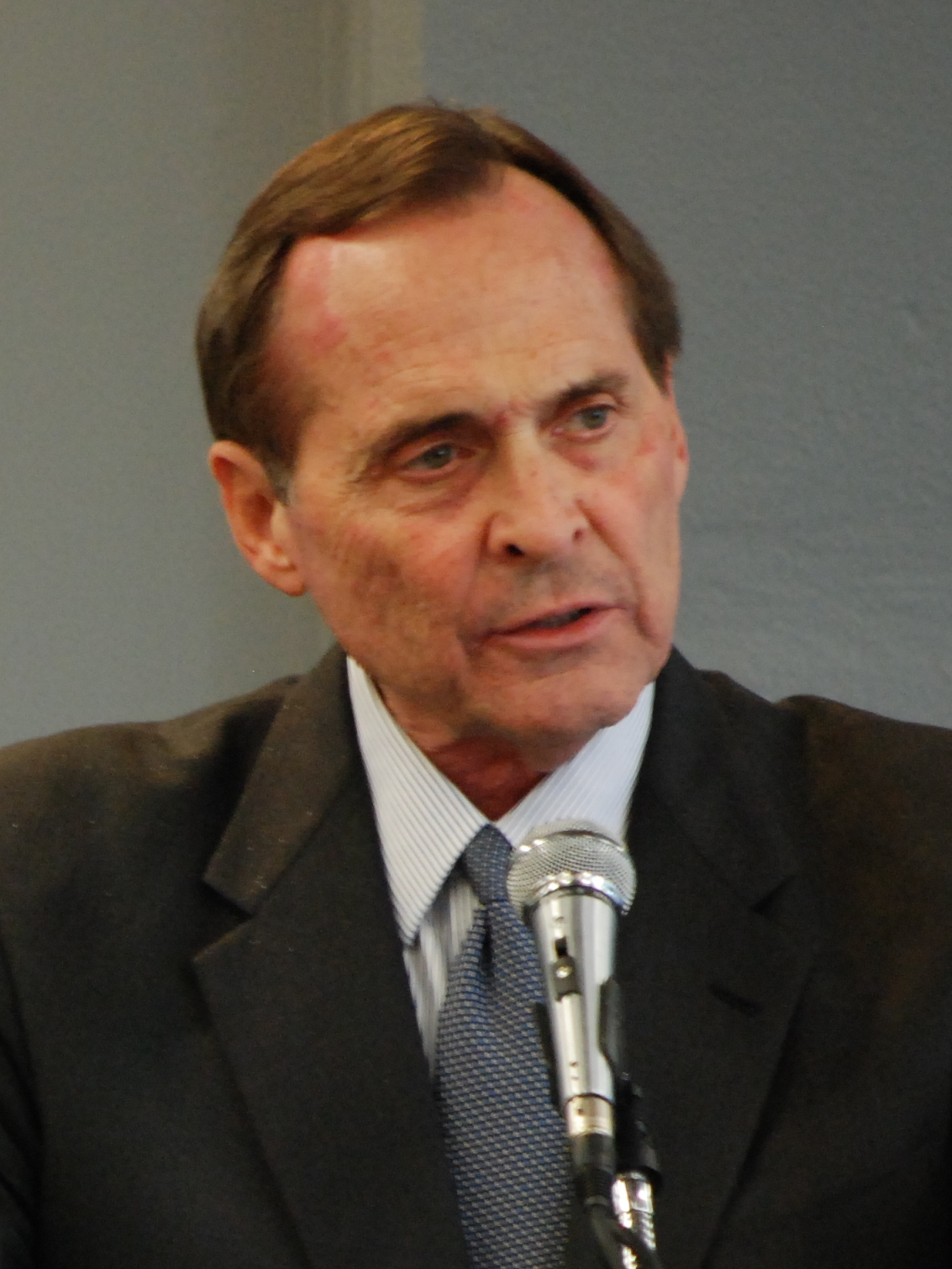

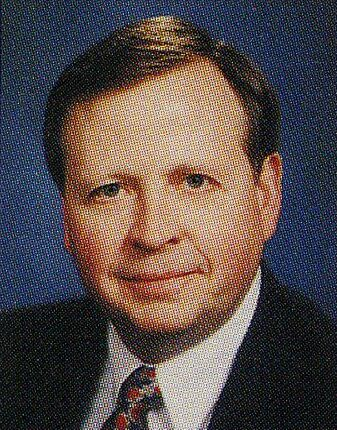
Nominee	Jim Petro	Leigh Herington
Party	Republican	Democratic
Popular vote	2,007,411	1,123,318
Percentage	64.12%	35.88%
- County results Petro: 50–60% 60–70% 70–80% Herington: 50–60%
Attorney General before election
Betty Montgomery
Republican
Elected Attorney General
Jim Petro
Republican

The 2002 Ohio Attorney General election was held on November 5, 2002, to elect the Ohio Attorney General. Republican incumbent Ohio Attorney General Betty Montgomery was term-limited and could not seek a third consecutive term. The Republican nominee, Ohio State Auditor Jim Petro, defeated Democratic Ohio Senate Minority Leader Leigh Herington in a landslide, outdoing Betty Montgomery's victory in the previous election, securing 64.12% of the vote.

== Republican primary ==
=== Candidates ===
- Jim Petro, Ohio State Auditor (1995–2003)

=== Campaign ===
The Republican primary was held on May 7, 2002. Petro won the Republican nomination without opposition.

=== Results ===
Republican primary results
Party	Candidate	Votes	%
Republican	Jim Petro	523,183	100%
Total votes		523,183	100%

== Democratic primary ==
=== Candidates ===
- Leigh Herington, Ohio Senate Minority Leader (2001–2003)

=== Campaign ===
The Democratic primary was held on May 7, 2002. Herington won the Democratic nomination unopposed.

=== Results ===
Democratic primary results
Party	Candidate	Votes	%
Democratic	Leigh Herington	405,453	100%
Total votes		405,453	100%

== General election ==
=== Candidates ===
- Jim Petro, Ohio State Auditor (1995–2003) (Republican)
- Leigh Herington, Ohio Senate Minority Leader (2001–2003)

=== Results ===
2002 Ohio Attorney General election results
Party	Candidate	Votes	%	±%
Republican	Jim Petro	2,007,411	64.12%	+1.95%
Democratic	Leigh Herington	1,123,318	35.88%	−1.95%
Total votes		3,130,729	100.00%	
Republican hold		Swing		
