= 2000 United States Senate election in Ohio =

- November 7, 2000
- Turnout: 63.65% (registered voters) ▲
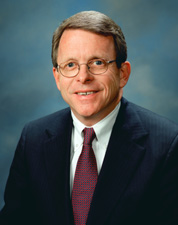

Nominee	Mike DeWine	Ted Celeste
Party	Republican	Democratic
Popular vote	2,666,736	1,597,122
Percentage	59.90%	35.87%
- DeWine: 40–50% 50–60% 60–70% 70–80% 80–90% >90% Celeste: 40–50% 50–60% 60–70% 70–80% 80–90% >90% Tie: 40–50% No votes
U.S. senator before election
Mike DeWine
Republican
Elected U.S. Senator
Mike DeWine
Republican

The 2000 United States Senate election in Ohio took place on November 7, 2000. Republican incumbent Mike DeWine was re-elected to a second term over Ted Celeste.

DeWine was the first Republican re-elected to the Senate from Ohio since John W. Bricker in 1952. This was the last time until the 2024 United States Senate election in Ohio that Republicans won Ohio’s Class 1 Senate seat.

== Republican primary ==
=== Candidates ===
- Frank Cremeans, former U.S. representative from Gallipolis
- Mike DeWine, incumbent U.S. senator since 1995
- Ronald Richard Dickson, gun show prompter

=== Result ===
Republican primary result
Party	Candidate	Votes	%
Republican	Mike DeWine (incumbent)	1,029,860	79.51
Republican	Ronald Richard Dickson	161,185	12.44
Republican	Frank Cremeans	104,219	8.05
Total votes		1,295,264	100

== Democratic primary ==
=== Candidates ===
- Ted Celeste, real estate developer and brother of former Ohio governor Dick Celeste
- Richard Cordray, former solicitor general of Ohio and 1998 nominee for Ohio attorney general
- Marvin McMickle, reverend
- Dan Radakovich, activist

=== Results ===
Democratic primary result
Party	Candidate	Votes	%
Democratic	Ted Celeste	375,205	43.86
Democratic	Marvin McMickle	208,291	24.35
Democratic	Richard Cordray	202,345	23.65
Democratic	Dan Radakovich	69,620	8.14
Total votes		855,461	100

== General election ==
=== Candidates ===
- Ted Celeste, real estate developer and rother of former Ohio governor Dick Celeste (Democratic)
- Mike DeWine, incumbent U.S. senator since 1995 (Republican)
- John Eastman (Natural Law)
- John McAlister (Libertarian)

=== Debates ===
- Complete video of debate, November 4, 2000

=== Polling ===
Poll source	Date(s)	Sample size	Margin of error	Mike DeWine (R)	Ted Celeste (D)	Other / undecided (Note: Calculated by taking the difference of 100% and all other candidates combined.)
Zogby Analytics	November 5, 2000	589	—	56%	31%	13%
Harris Insights & Analytics	November 3, 2000	10,956	—	59%	36%	5%
University of Cincinnati (Ohio Poll)	November 3, 2000	1,179	—	63%	34.1%	2.9%
Mason-Dixon Polling & Strategy	November 2, 2000	625	—	56%	32%	12%
Zogby Analytics	November 2, 2000	600	—	61%	29%	10%
SurveyUSA	November 1, 2000	500	—	56%	37%	7%
Columbus Dispatch	October 31, 2000	2,050	—	61%	34%	5%
Zogby Analytics	October 30, 2000	600	—	60%	27%	13%
Zogby Analytics	October 27, 2000	600	—	57%	32%	11%
Rasmussen Reports	October 23, 2000	929	—	56%	30%	14%
University of Cincinnati (Ohio Poll)	October 22, 2000	608	—	59%	34%	7%
Mason-Dixon Polling & Strategy	October 19, 2000	625	—	54%	31%	15%

=== Results ===
Ohio United States Senate election, 2000
Party	Candidate	Votes	%	±%
Republican	Mike DeWine (incumbent)	2,666,736	59.90%	+6.46%
Democratic	Ted Celeste	1,597,122	35.87%	−3.36%
Libertarian	John McAlister	117,466	2.64%	N/A
Natural Law	John Eastman	70,738	1.59%	N/A
Write-in		74	0.00%	N/A
Majority		1,069,614	24.03%	+9.82%
Turnout		4,452,136	63.6	
Republican hold		Swing		

==== Counties that flipped from Democratic to Republican ====
- Harrison (largest city: Cadiz)
- Jefferson (largest city: Steubenville)
- Athens (largest city: Athens)
- Cuyahoga (largest city: Cleveland)
- Lucas (largest city: Toledo)

==== Counties that flipped from Republican to Democratic ====
- Madison (largest city: London)

== See also ==
- 2000 United States Senate elections
