= 1974 Ohio Attorney General election =

- November 5, 1974

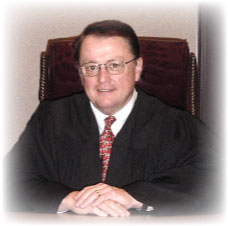
Nominee	William J. Brown	George Curtis Smith
Party	Democratic	Republican
Popular vote	1,645,923	1,140,556
Percentage	59.07%	40.93%
- County results Brown: 50–60% 60–70% 70–80% Smith: 50–60%
Attorney General before election
William J. Brown
Democratic
Elected Attorney General
William J. Brown
Democratic

The 1974 Ohio attorney general election was held on November 5, 1974, to elect the Ohio attorney general. Democratic incumbent William J. Brown defeated Republican challenger, Prosecuting Attorney of Franklin County George Curtis Smith, by a wide margin of nearly 20 percentage points.

== Democratic primary ==
=== Candidates ===
- William J. Brown, incumbent Ohio attorney general (1971–1983)

=== Campaign ===
The Democratic primary was held on May 7, 1974. Brown won renomination unopposed.

=== Results ===
Democratic primary results
Party	Candidate	Votes	%
Democratic	William J. Brown	742,290	100%
Total votes		742,290	100%

== Republican primary ==
=== Candidates ===
- Stan Aronoff, Ohio state senator (1967–1996)
- David Dudley Dowd Jr., prosecuting attorney of Stark County (1967–1975)
- George Curtis Smith, prosecuting attorney of Franklin County (1971–1980)

=== Campaign ===
The Republican primary was held on May 7, 1974. Smith very narrowly defeated Dowd and Aranoff to seize the Republican nomination, winning just 35.55% of the vote.

=== Results ===
Republican primary results
Party	Candidate	Votes	%
Republican	George Curtis Smith	182,641	35.55%
Republican	David Dudley Dowd Jr.	179,500	34.94%
Republican	Stan Aronoff	151,661	29.52%
Total votes		513,802	100%

== General election ==
=== Candidates ===
- William J. Brown, incumbent Ohio attorney general (1971–1983) (Democratic)
- George Curtis Smith, prosecuting attorney of Franklin County (1971–1980) (Republican)

=== Results ===
1974 Ohio attorney general election results
Party	Candidate	Votes	%	±%
Democratic	William J. Brown	1,645,923	59.07%	+3.64%
Republican	George Curtis Smith	1,140,556	40.93%	−3.63%
Total votes		2,786,479	100.00%	
Democratic hold				
