= 1986 Ohio Attorney General election =

- November 4, 1986
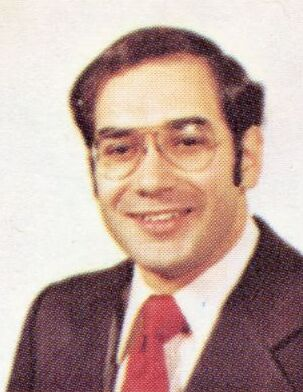

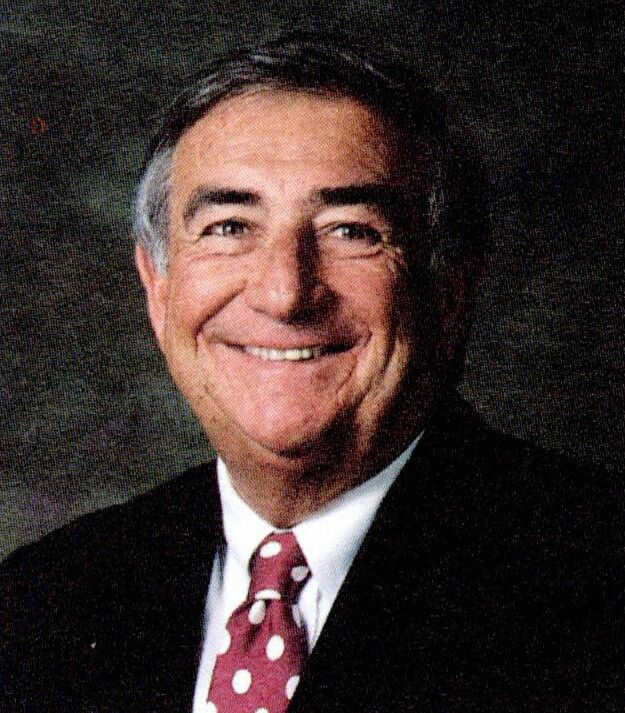
Nominee	Anthony J. Celebrezze Jr.	Barry Levey
Party	Democratic	Republican
Popular vote	1,821,587	1,222,102
Percentage	59.85%	40.15%
- County results Celebrezze: 50–60% 60–70% 70–80% Levey: 50–60%
Attorney General before election
Anthony J. Celebrezze Jr.
Democratic
Elected Attorney General
Anthony J. Celebrezze Jr.
Democratic

The 1986 Ohio Attorney General election was held on November 4, 1986, to elect the Ohio Attorney General. Incumbent Democratic Ohio Attorney General Anthony J. Celebrezze Jr. defeated Republican challenger former Ohio House Representative Barry Levey by a wide margin of almost 20 percentage points, securing 59.85% of the vote.

== Democratic primary ==
=== Candidates ===
- Anthony J. Celebrezze Jr., incumbent Ohio Attorney General (1983–1991)

=== Campaign ===
The Democratic primary was held on May 6, 1986. Celebrezze was renominated without opposition.

=== Results ===
Democratic primary results
Party	Candidate	Votes	%
Democratic	Anthony J. Celebrezze Jr.	637,594	100%
Total votes		637,594	100%

== Republican primary ==
=== Candidates ===
- Barry Levey, former Ohio House Representative (1963–1970)

=== Campaign ===
The Republican primary was held on May 6, 1986. Levey won the Republican nomination unopposed.

=== Results ===
Republican primary results
Party	Candidate	Votes	%
Republican	Barry Levey	518,087	100%
Total votes		518,087	100%

== General election ==
=== Candidates ===
- Anthony J. Celebrezze Jr., incumbent Ohio Attorney General (1983–1991) (Democratic)
- Barry Levey, former Ohio House Representative (1963–1970) (Republican)

=== Results ===
1986 Ohio Attorney General results
Party	Candidate	Votes	%	±%
Democratic	Anthony J. Celebrezze Jr.	1,821,587	59.85%	−1.45%
Republican	Barry Levey	1,222,102	40.15%	+3.91%
Total votes		3,043,689	100.00%	
Democratic hold				
