= 1970 Ohio Attorney General election =

- November 3, 1970

Nominee	William J. Brown	John D. Herbert
Party	Democratic	Republican
Popular vote	1,613,926	1,297,421
Percentage	55.43%	44.56%
- County results Brown: 50–60% 60–70% Herbert: 50–60% 60–70%
Attorney General before election
Paul W. Brown
Republican
Elected Attorney General
William J. Brown
Democratic

The 1970 Ohio Attorney General election was held on November 3, 1970, to elect the Ohio Attorney General. Incumbent Republican Ohio Attorney General Paul W. Brown, who was appointed following William B. Saxbe's resignation after winning election to the Senate in 1968, chose not to run for re-election, instead unsuccessfully running in the Republican primary for Governor of Ohio.

The Democratic nominee, lawyer William J. Brown, defeated Republican opponent, Ohio State Treasurer John D. Herbert, by ten percentage points.

== Republican primary ==
=== Candidates ===
- John D. Herbert, Ohio State Treasurer (1963–1971)

=== Campaign ===
The Republican primary was held on May 5, 1970. Herbert won the Republican nomination unopposed.

=== Results ===
Republican primary results
Party	Candidate	Votes	%
Republican	John D. Herbert	733,229	100%
Total votes		733,229	100%

== Democratic primary ==
=== Candidates ===
- William J. Brown, lawyer
- John McDonald, Ohio House Representative (1965–1970) and Ohio House Minority Leader (1969–1970)
- David J. Boyd
- C. Raymond Marvin

=== Campaign ===
The Democratic primary was held on May 5, 1970. Brown won the nomination easily, defeating his closest opponent, Ohio House Minority Leader John McDonald, by 12 percentage points, albeit still with only a plurality of the popular vote.

=== Results ===
Democratic primary results
Party	Candidate	Votes	%
Democratic	William J. Brown	346,514	45.82%
Democratic	John McDonald	253,876	33.57%
Democratic	David J. Boyd	97,719	12.92%
Democratic	C. Raymond Marvin	58,147	7.69%
Total votes		756,256	100%

== General election ==
=== Candidates ===
- William J. Brown, lawyer (Democratic)
- John D. Herbert, Ohio State Treasurer (1963–1971) (Republican)
- Al Budka (Write-in)

=== Campaign ===
Herbert was hurt by the Crofters scandal, which alleged that he and several other Republican candidates had taken illicit campaign contributions from a Columbus company named Crofters Inc., which arranged for the illegal loans of state funds. Herbert faced some calls from within his own party to drop out of the race but adamantly refused, informing a friend that he would stay in the race "and drag the whole bunch of them down with me."

=== Results ===
1970 Ohio Attorney General election results
Party	Candidate	Votes	%	±%
Democratic	William J. Brown	1,613,926	55.43%	+10.66%
Republican	John D. Herbert	1,297,421	44.56%	−10.67%
Write-in	Al Budka	94	0.00%	N/A
Total votes		2,911,441	100.0%	
Democratic gain from Republican				
