= 1966 Ohio Attorney General election =

- November 8, 1966
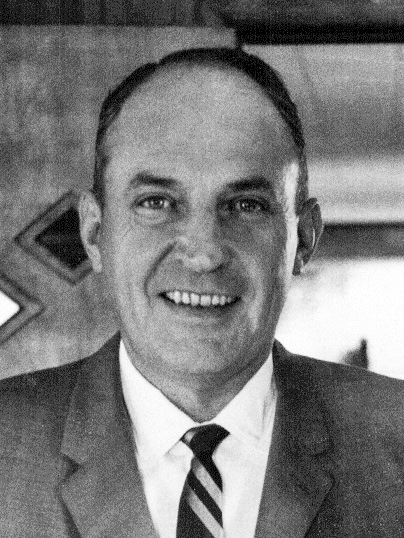

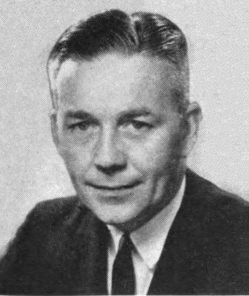
Nominee	William B. Saxbe	Robert E. Sweeney
Party	Republican	Democratic
Popular vote	1,522,038	1,233,805
Percentage	55.23%	44.77%
- County results Saxbe: 50–60% 60–70% 70–80% Sweeney: 50–60%
Attorney General before election
William B. Saxbe
Republican
Elected Attorney General
William B. Saxbe
Republican

The 1996 Ohio Attorney General election was held on November 8, 1966, to elect the Ohio Attorney General. Republican incumbent Ohio Attorney General William B. Saxbe defeated his returning 1962 Democratic opponent, Representative Robert E. Sweeney, by ten percentage points.

Saxbe would not serve another full term as Ohio Attorney General as he would go on to resign in 1969 after winning election to the United States Senate.

== Republican primary ==
=== Candidates ===
- William B. Saxbe, incumbent Ohio Attorney General (1963–1969) (1957–1959)

=== Campaign ===
The Republican primary was held on May 3, 1966. Saxbe won renomination unopposed.

=== Results ===
Republican primary results
Party	Candidate	Votes	%
Republican	William B. Saxbe	559,305	100%
Total votes		559,305	100%

== Democratic primary ==
=== Candidates ===
- Robert E. Sweeney, United States Representative (1965–1967)
- Mark McElroy, former Ohio Attorney General (1959–1963)

=== Campaign ===
The Democratic primary was held on May 3, 1966. Representative Robert E. Sweeney narrowly defeated former Ohio Attorney General Mark McElroy to win the Democratic nomination.

=== Results ===
Democratic primary results
Party	Candidate	Votes	%
Democratic	Robert E. Sweeney	296,216	53.39%
Democratic	John McDonald	258,622	46.61%
Total votes		554,838	100%

== General election ==
=== Candidates ===
- William B. Saxbe, incumbent Ohio Attorney General (1963–1969) (1957–1959) (Republican)
- Robert E. Sweeney, United States Representative (1965–1967) (Democratic)

=== Results ===
1966 Ohio Attorney General election results
Party	Candidate	Votes	%	±%
Republican	William B. Saxbe	1,522,038	55.23%	+3.36%
Democratic	Robert E. Sweeney	1,233,805	44.77%	−3.36%
Total votes		2,755,843	100.00%	
Republican hold				
