= 1978 Ohio Attorney General election =

- November 7, 1978

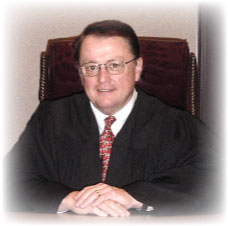
Nominee	William J. Brown	George Curtis Smith
Party	Democratic	Republican
Popular vote	1,700,262	968,220
Percentage	63.72%	36.28%
- County results Brown: 50–60% 60–70% 70–80% Smith: 50–60%
Attorney General before election
William J. Brown
Democratic
Elected Attorney General
William J. Brown
Democratic

The 1978 Ohio Attorney General election was held on November 7, 1978, to elect the Ohio Attorney General. Democratic incumbent Ohio Attorney General William J. Brown faced his returning opponent from the 1974 Ohio Attorney General race, Republican Prosecuting Attorney of Franklin County George Curtis Smith. Brown won re-election in a landslide, defeating Smith with 63.72% of the vote.

== Democratic primary ==
=== Candidates ===
- William J. Brown, incumbent Ohio Attorney General (1971–1983)

=== Campaign ===
The Democratic primary was held on June 6, 1978. Brown won renomination unopposed.

=== Results ===
Democratic primary results
Party	Candidate	Votes	%
Democratic	William J. Brown	493,043	100%
Total votes		493,043	100%

== Republican primary ==
=== Candidates ===
- George Curtis Smith, Prosecuting Attorney of Franklin County (1971–1980)
- Walter E. Beckford

=== Campaign ===
The Republican primary was held on June 6, 1978. Smith easily won the Republican nomination, defeating Beckford with 65.14% of the vote.

=== Results ===
Republican primary results
Party	Candidate	Votes	%
Republican	George C. Smith	311,317	65.14%
Republican	Walter E. Beckford	166,628	34.86%
Total votes		477,945	100%

== General election ==
=== Candidates ===
- William J. Brown, incumbent Ohio Attorney General (1971–1983) (Democratic)
- George Curtis Smith, Prosecuting Attorney of Franklin County, (1971–1980) (Republican)

=== Results ===
1978 Ohio Attorney General election results
Party	Candidate	Votes	%	±%
Democratic	William J. Brown	1,700,262	63.72%	+4.65%
Republican	George Curtis Smith	968,220	36.28%	−4.65%
Total votes		2,668,482	100.00%	
Democratic hold				
