= Mark McElroy =

Mark McElroy may refer to:

- Mark McElroy (Arkansas politician), American politician, member of the Arkansas House of Representatives from the 11th district
- Mark McElroy (Ohio politician) (1906–1981), American Democratic politician from Cleveland, Ohio
