= 1966 Ohio State Treasurer election =

- November 8, 1966

Nominee	John D. Herbert	Eldon Brown
Party	Republican	Democratic
Popular vote	1,567,094	1,095,756
Percentage	58.85%	41.15%
- County results Herbert: 50–60% 60–70% 70–80% Brown: 50–60%
Ohio State Treasurer before election
John D. Herbert
Republican
Elected Ohio State Treasurer
John D. Herbert
Republican

The 1966 Ohio State Treasurer election was held on November 8, 1966, to elect the Ohio State Treasurer. Primaries were held on May 3, 1966. Republican incumbent Ohio State Treasurer John D. Herbert won re-election in a landslide, defeating Democrat Eldon Brown by seventeen percentage points.

== Republican primary ==
=== Candidates ===
- John D. Herbert, incumbent Ohio State Treasurer (1963–1971)

=== Campaign ===
Herbert won renomination unopposed.

=== Results ===
Republican primary results
Party	Candidate	Votes	%
Republican	John D. Herbert	543,575	100.00%
Total votes		543,575	100.00%

== Democratic primary ==
=== Candidates ===
- Eldon Brown, State Examiner in Ohio State Auditor office
- Michael E. Entinger

=== Campaign ===
Eldon Brown easily won the Democratic nomination over Michael E. Entinger, winning by 20 percentage points.

=== Results ===
Democratic primary results
Party	Candidate	Votes	%
Democratic	Eldon Brown	280,575	60.02%
Democratic	Michael E. Entinger	186,881	39.98%
Total votes		467,456	100.00%

== General election ==
=== Candidates ===
- John D. Herbert, incumbent Ohio State Treasurer (1963–1971) (Republican)
- Eldon Brown, State Examiner in Ohio State Auditor office (Democratic)

=== Results ===
1966 Ohio State Treasurer election results
Party	Candidate	Votes	%	±%
Republican	John D. Herbert	1,567,094	58.85%	+8.26
Democratic	Eldon Brown	1,095,756	41.15%	−8.26
Total votes		2,662,850	100.00%	
Republican hold				
