= David Armbruster =

David Armbruster may refer to:

- David Armbruster (politician) (1917–1993), American politician who served in the Ohio House of Representatives
- David Armbruster (swim coach) (1890–1985), American swim coach
