= 1998 Ohio State Auditor election =

- November 3, 1998
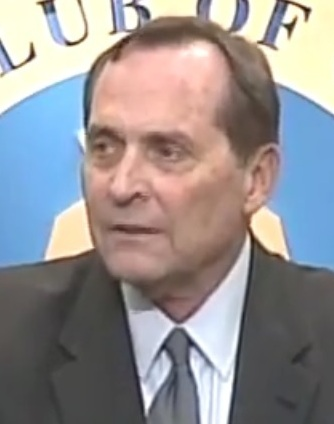

Nominee	Jim Petro	Louis N. Strike
Party	Republican	Democratic
Popular vote	1,975,793	1,191,250
Percentage	62.39%	37.61%
- County results Petro: 50–60% 60–70% 70–80% Strike: 50–60% 60–70%
State Auditor before election
Jim Petro
Republican
Elected State Auditor
Jim Petro
Republican

The 1998 Ohio State Auditor election was held on November 3, 1998, to elect the Ohio State Auditor. Primaries were held on May 3, 1998. Republican incumbent Ohio State Auditor Jim Petro won the election in a landslide, defeating Democratic opponent Louis N. Strike with 62.39% of the vote.

== Republican primary ==
=== Candidates ===
==== Nominee ====
- Jim Petro, incumbent Ohio State Auditor (1995–2003)

=== Campaign ===
Petro won renomination without opposition.

=== Results ===
Republican primary results
Party	Candidate	Votes	%
Republican	Jim Petro	609,292	100.00%
Total votes		609,292	100.00%

== Democratic primary ==
=== Candidates ===
==== Nominee ====
- Louis N. Strike

=== Campaign ===
Strike won the Democratic nomination without opposition.

=== Results ===
Democratic primary results
Party	Candidate	Votes	%
Democratic	Louis N. Strike	555,903	100.00%
Total votes		555,903	100.00%

== General election ==
=== Results ===
1998 Ohio State Auditor election results
Party	Candidate	Votes	%	±%
Republican	Jim Petro	1,975,793	62.39%	+3.91%
Democratic	Louis N. Strike	1,191,250	37.61%	−3.91%
Total votes		3,167,043	100.00%	
Republican hold				
