= 1990 Ohio Attorney General election =

- November 6, 1990
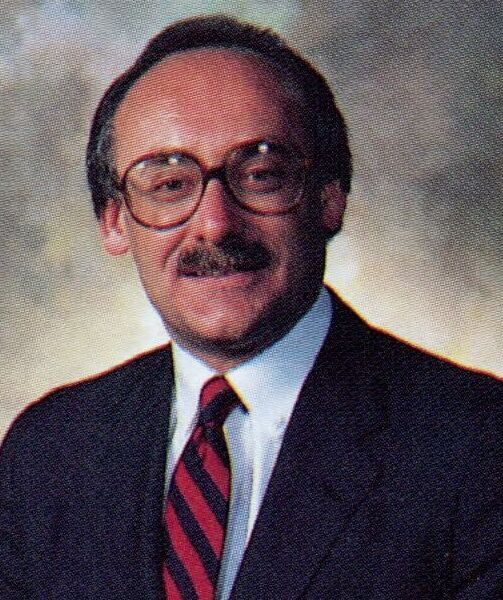

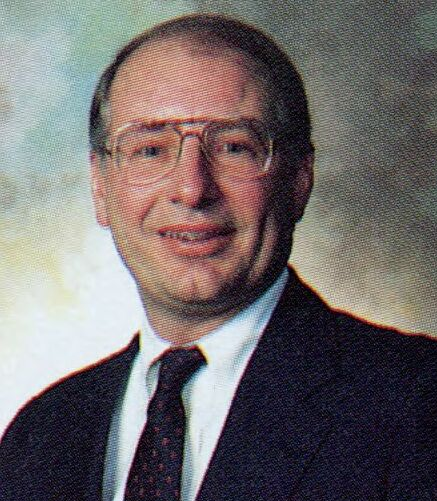
Nominee	Lee Fisher	Paul Pfeifer
Party	Democratic	Republican
Popular vote	1,680,698	1,679,464
Percentage	50.02%	49.98%
- County results Fisher: 50–60% 60–70% Pfeifer: 50–60% 60–70%
Attorney General before election
Anthony J. Celebrezze Jr.
Democratic
Elected Attorney General
Lee Fisher
Democratic

The 1990 Ohio Attorney General election was held on November 6, 1990, to elect the Ohio Attorney General. Incumbent Ohio Attorney General Anthony J. Celebrezze Jr. chose not to run for re-election in order to unsuccessfully run for Governor of Ohio. The Democratic nominee, Ohio State Senator Lee Fisher, defeated Republican fellow Ohio State Senator Paul Pfeifer in an extremely close election by a narrow margin of just 1,234 votes.

== Democratic primary ==
=== Candidates ===
- Lee Fisher, Ohio State Senator (1983–1990)
- Charles T. Brown, lawyer
- James A. Philomena, Mahoning County Prosecutor (1989–1997)
- Frederick D. Middleton Jr.

=== Campaign ===
The Democratic primary was held on May 8, 1990. Fisher won the Democratic nomination with a plurality of the popular vote.

=== Results ===
Democratic primary results
Party	Candidate	Votes	%
Democratic	Lee Fisher	394,332	48.83%
Democratic	Charles T. Brown	246,729	30.55%
Democratic	James A. Philomena	101,036	12.51%
Democratic	Frederick D. Middleton Jr.	65,506	8.11%
Total votes		807,603	100.00%

== Republican primary ==
=== Candidates ===
- Paul Pfeifer, Ohio State Senator (1977–1992)

=== Campaign ===
The Republican primary was held on May 8, 1990. Paul Pfeifer won the Republican nomination unopposed.

=== Results ===
Republican primary results
Party	Candidate	Votes	%
Republican	Paul Pfeifer	551,953	100%
Total votes		551,953	100.00%

== General election ==
=== Candidates ===
- Lee Fisher, Ohio State Senator (1983–1990) (Democratic)
- Paul Pfeifer, Ohio State Senator (1977–1992) (Republican)

=== Results ===
The election was close enough to trigger an automatic statewide recount. After several weeks, Fisher was declared the winner by a razor-thin margin of 0.04%, only 1,234 votes.

1990 Ohio Attorney General results
Party	Candidate	Votes	%	±%
Democratic	Lee Fisher	1,680,698	50.02%	−9.83%
Republican	Paul Pfeifer	1,679,464	49.98%	+9.83%
Total votes		3,360,162	100.00%	
Democratic hold				
