= Armbruster =

Armbruster may refer to the following:

== People ==
- Ben Armbruster (born 2002), Australian swimmer
- Charlie Armbruster (1880–1964), American baseball player
- Christian H. Armbruster (1921–1986), American politician from New York
- Daniel Armbruster, member of rock band Joywave
- David Armbruster (politician) (1917–1993), American politician from Ohio
- David Armbruster (1890–1985), American swim coach
- Eugene Armbruster (1865–1943), German-born American illustrator and photographer
- Harry Armbruster (1882–1953), American baseball player
- Jeff Armbruster, American politician from Ohio
- Jen Armbruster (born 1975), American goalball player
- Kurt Armbruster (1934–2019), Swiss footballer
- Peter Armbruster (1931–2024), German physicist
- Robert Armbruster (1897–1994), American composer, conductor, pianist, and songwriter
- Vic Armbruster (1902–1984), Australian rugby player

Fictional

- Brad J. Armbruster, also known as "Ace", from the G.I. Joe franchise (see Ace (G.I. Joe))

== Places ==
- Armbruster Rocks, Antarctic exposed rocks on the west side of Wright Island

== Other ==
- Armbruster's wolf (Canis armbrusteri), an extinct species of canid which was endemic to North America

== See also ==
- Armbrust
