= 1994 Ohio State Auditor election =

- November 8, 1994
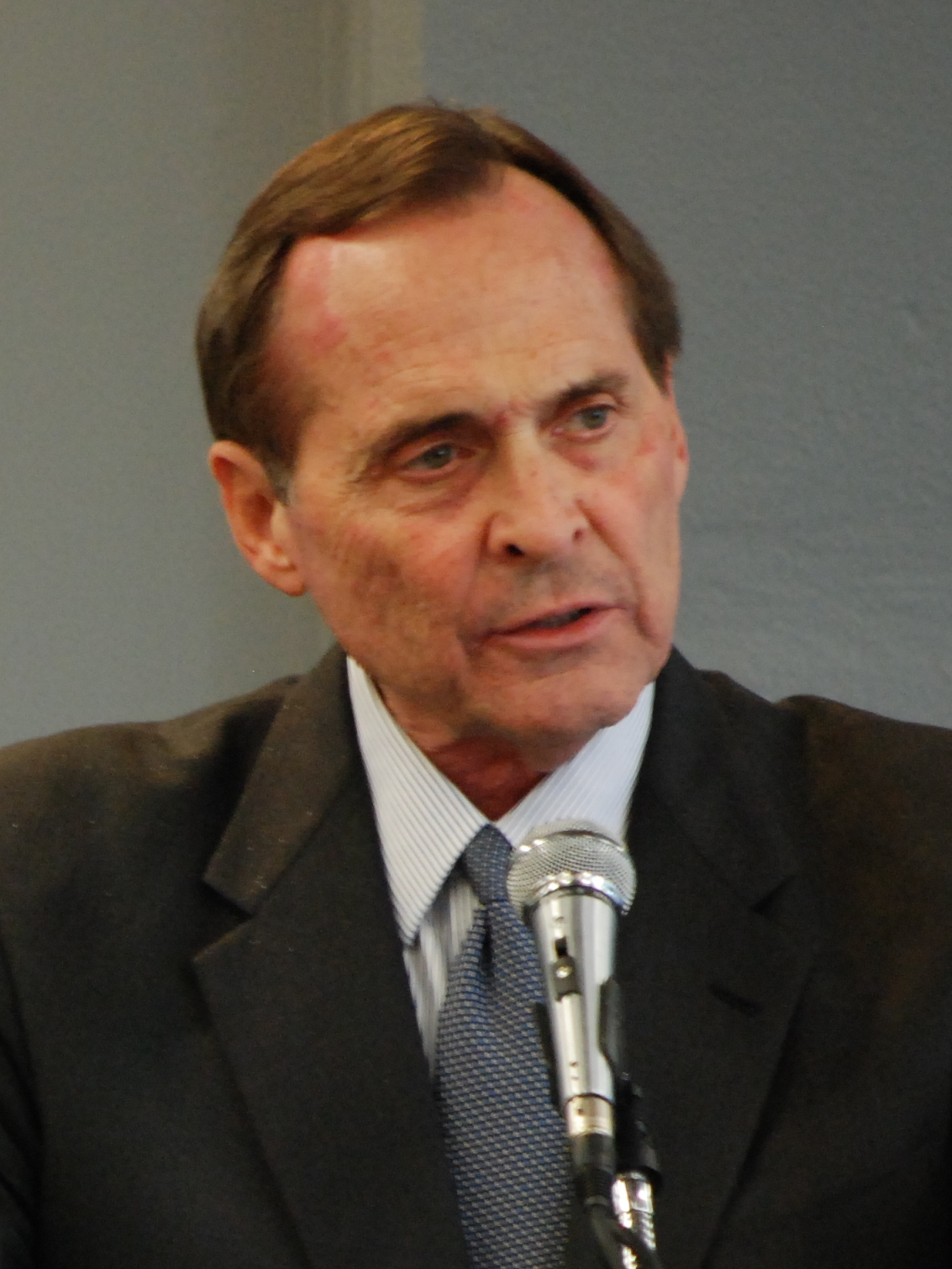

Nominee	Jim Petro	Randall W. Sweeney
Party	Republican	Democratic
Popular vote	1,883,852	1,337,558
Percentage	58.48%	41.52%
- County results Petro: 50–60% 60–70% 70–80% Sweeney: 50–60% 60–70% 70–80%
State Auditor before election
Thomas E. Ferguson
Democratic
Elected State Auditor
Jim Petro
Republican

The 1994 Ohio State Auditor election was held on November 8, 1994, to elect the Ohio State Auditor. Primaries were held on May 3, 1994. Democratic incumbent Ohio State Auditor Thomas E. Ferguson chose to retire rather than seek another term.

Republican Cuyahoga County Commissioner and previously unsuccessful 1990 candidate for this office Jim Petro won the election, defeating Democrat Randall W. Sweeney by 16 percentage points.

This election marked the end of the Democrats' and the Ferguson family dynasty's control of the office of Ohio State Auditor; they had collectively held the office for 24 years, from 1971 until 1995.

== Democratic primary ==
=== Candidates ===
- Randall W. Sweeney
- Ray T. Kest, Lucas County Treasurer (1988–2004)

=== Campaign ===
Sweeney easily won the nomination over Lucas County Treasurer Ray T. Kest, winning by over 30 percentage points.

=== Results ===
Democratic primary results
Party	Candidate	Votes	%
Democratic	Randall W. Sweeney	508,324	67.39%
Democratic	Ray T. Kest	245,971	32.61%
Total votes		739,724	100.00%

== Republican primary ==
=== Candidates ===
- Jim Petro, Cuyahoga County Commissioner (1991–1995)

=== Campaign ===
Petro won the Republican nomination unopposed.

=== Results ===
Republican primary results
Party	Candidate	Votes	%
Republican	Jim Petro	609,280	100%
Total votes		609,280	100.00%

== General election ==
=== Candidates ===
- Jim Petro, Cuyahoga County Commissioner (1991–1995) (Republican)
- Randall W. Sweeney (Democratic)

=== Results ===
1994 Ohio State Auditor election results
Party	Candidate	Votes	%	±%
Republican	Jim Petro	1,883,852	58.48%	+11.28%
Democratic	Randall W. Sweeney	1,337,558	41.52%	−11.28%
Total votes		3,266,718	100.00%	
Republican gain from Democratic				
