= 1994 Ohio Attorney General election =

- November 8, 1994

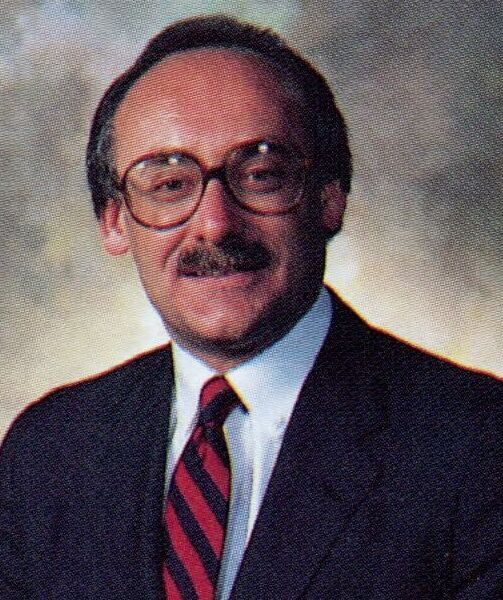
Nominee	Betty Montgomery	Lee Fisher
Party	Republican	Democratic
Popular vote	1,716,451	1,625,247
Percentage	51.36%	48.63%
- County results Montgomery: 50–60% 60–70% 70–80% Fisher: 50–60% 60–70%
Attorney General before election
Lee Fisher
Democratic
Elected Attorney General
Betty Montgomery
Republican

The 1994 Ohio Attorney General election was held on November 8, 1994, to elect the Ohio Attorney General. Republican Ohio State Senator Betty Montgomery narrowly defeated incumbent Democratic Ohio Attorney General Lee Fisher. With her victory, Betty Montgomery became the first woman to serve as Ohio Attorney General.

== Democratic primary ==
=== Candidates ===
- Lee Fisher, incumbent Ohio Attorney General (1991–1995)

=== Campaign ===
The Democratic primary was held on May 3, 1994. Fisher won renomination without opposition.

=== Results ===
Democratic primary results
Party	Candidate	Votes	%
Democratic	Lee Fisher	739,724	100%
Total votes		739,724	100.00%

== Republican primary ==
=== Candidates ===
- Betty Montgomery, Ohio State Senator (1989–1995)

=== Campaign ===
The Republican primary was held on May 3, 1994. Montgomery won the Republican nomination unopposed.

=== Results ===
Republican primary results
Party	Candidate	Votes	%
Republican	Betty Montgomery	620,624	100%
Total votes		620,624	100.00%

== General election ==
=== Candidates ===
- Betty Montgomery, Ohio State Senator (1989–1995)
- Lee Fisher, incumbent Ohio Attorney General (1991–1995)

=== Results ===
1994 Ohio Attorney General election results
Party	Candidate	Votes	%	±%
Republican	Betty Montgomery	1,716,451	51.36%	+1.38%
Democratic	Lee Fisher	1,625,247	48.63%	−1.39%
Write-in	Guy Templeton Black	123	0.00%	
Total votes		3,341,821	100.00%	
Republican gain from Democratic		Swing		
