= John Little (Ohio politician) =

American politician (1837–1900)

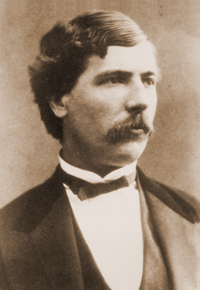

Member of the U.S. House of Representatives from Ohio's 8th district
- In office March 4, 1885 – March 3, 1887
- Preceded by: J. Warren Keifer
- Succeeded by: Robert P. Kennedy

13th Ohio Attorney General
- In office January 12, 1874 – January 14, 1878
- Governor: William Allen; Rutherford B. Hayes; Thomas L. Young
- Preceded by: Francis Bates Pond
- Succeeded by: Isaiah Pillars

Member of the Ohio House of Representatives from the Greene County district
- In office January 3, 1870 – January 4, 1874
- Preceded by: R. F. Howard
- Succeeded by: Isaac M. Barrett

Personal details
- Born: April 25, 1837 Grape Grove, Ohio, US
- Died: October 18, 1900 (aged 63) Xenia, Ohio, US
- Resting place: Woodlawn Cemetery, Xenia
- Party: Republican
- Spouse: Barbara Jane Sheets
- Children: two
- Education: Antioch College

John Little (April 25, 1837 – October 18, 1900) was an American lawyer and politician who served as a one-term U.S. Representative from Ohio from 1885 to 1887.

== Biography ==
Born near Grape Grove, Ross Township, Greene County, Ohio, Little attended the common schools. He was graduated from Antioch College, Yellow Springs, Ohio, in 1862. He studied law.

=== Early career ===
He was admitted to the bar in 1865 and commenced practice in Xenia, Ohio. He served as mayor of Xenia from 1864 to 1866. He served as prosecuting attorney of Greene County from 1866 to 1870. He served as member of the state house of representatives from 1869 to 1873. Attorney general of Ohio 1873-1877.

=== Congress ===
Little was elected as a Republican to the Forty-ninth Congress (March 4, 1885 – March 3, 1887). In 1886, he was re-districted, and lost re-election by 2 votes.

=== Later career ===
He resumed the practice of law. He was appointed by President Harrison a member of the United States and Venezuela Claims Commission in 1889 and was its chairman. He served as member of the Ohio State Board of Arbitration. Trustee of Antioch College 1880-1900.

== Death and burial ==
He died in Xenia, Ohio, on October 18, 1900. He was interred in Woodland Cemetery.

== Family ==
Little married Barbara Jane Sheets, of Troy, Ohio, October 19, 1865. They had children named George and Mary. Barbara died at Xenia, May 30, 1902.

== Sources ==
- United States Congress. "John Little (id: L000351)". Biographical Directory of the United States Congress.

U.S. House of Representatives
Preceded by J. Warren Keifer	Member of the U.S. House of Representatives from Ohio's 8th congressional district 1885-1887	Succeeded by Robert P. Kennedy
