= Isaiah Pillars =

American politician (1833-1895)

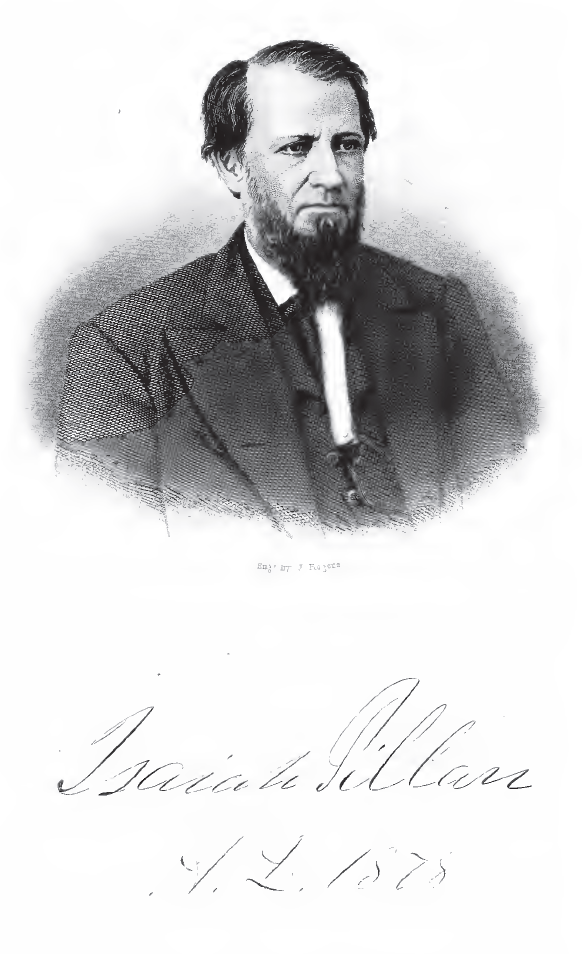

14th Ohio Attorney General
- In office January 14, 1878 – January 12, 1880
- Governor: Richard M. Bishop
- Preceded by: John Little
- Succeeded by: George K. Nash

Member of the Ohio House of Representatives from the Allen County district
- In office January 1, 1872 – January 4, 1874
- Preceded by: William Armstrong
- Succeeded by: Thomas M. Robb

Personal details
- Born: March 17, 1833 Jefferson County, Ohio, U.S.
- Died: September 13, 1895 (aged 62) Lima, Ohio, U.S.
- Resting place: Old Lima Cemetery
- Party: Democratic
- Spouse: Susan Fickle
- Children: four
- Education: Heidelberg College

Military service
- Allegiance: United States
- Branch/service: Union Army
- Rank: Colonel
- Commands: Camp Lima

Isaiah Pillars (March 17, 1833 – September 13, 1895) was a lawyer in the U.S. state of Ohio who served in the Ohio House of Representatives and was Ohio Attorney General 1878-1880.

== Biography ==
Isaiah Pillars was born March 17, 1833, in Jefferson County, Ohio, and spent part of his youth in Carroll County before being moved to Risden (now Fostoria) in Seneca County, where his mother died when he was eight years old. At age sixteen, he began teaching school, and attended the Seneca County Academy and Heidelberg College in Tiffin. He read law in the office of his brother James Pillars. He was admitted to the bar at age 21 and commenced practice at Lima, Ohio, in 1855. In 1862 he was made commandant of Camp Lima by Governor Tod with rank Colonel, and organized the 99th, 118th and 81st Ohio Infantry regiments.

In 1866 Pillars was elected Prosecuting Attorney of Allen County, and was elected as a Democrat to the Ohio House of representatives in 1871 for the 60th General Assembly, 1872-1873. He vigorously opposed a tax to support railroad construction, and was vindicated when the Ohio Supreme Court found the tax unconstitutional. He also authored a minority report in favor of abolishing capital punishment, with a summary of arguments:

- That the infliction of death as a punishment for crime, is a relic of the laws of revenge and retaliation.
- That crime is not lessened by, and that the protection of society in no way demands the death of the offender.
- That the infliction of capital punishment does not deter others by way of example, from the commission of crime.
- That its effect upon society is to debase and blunt the finer sensibilities, and thereby increases the disposition for the commission of crime.
- That by it, one of the legitimate purposes of punishment, the reformation of the criminal is wholly defeated.
- That by capital punishment the divine right of life is violated under the sanction of law, the sacred regard for human life destroyed, and many times innocent persons put to death.
- That by substitution of imprisonment for life for the death penalty, convictions and punishments would be rendered far more certain, and thereby crime would be lessened, and all the purposes of punishment be accomplished.

In 1877, Pillars was elected Ohio Attorney General, defeating Republican George K. Nash. He lost to Nash for re-election in 1879. Pillars had been a Republican until 1864, but became a Democrat at that time.

Pillars married Susan Fickle of Lima in February 1866, or perhaps 1856., and she died in 1870. He had two sons and two daughters, one of whom died in early childhood. He was a believer in the doctrine of Emanuel Swedenborg, writing a small book about his life and doctrines.

Pillars died at Lima, Ohio September 13, 1895.

== Publications ==
- Pillars, Isaiah. Lecture on Swedenborg: (the Swedish theosopher and seer) : his works and doctrines. OCLC 62476702.
- Pillars, Isaiah; Ohio General Assembly, House Judiciary Committee (1873). Report in favor of the abolition of capital punishment: to the House of Representatives. OCLC 39613806.

== Notes ==
Legal offices
| Preceded by John Little | Attorney General of Ohio; 1878–1880 | Succeeded by George K. Nash |
