= 1851 Ohio Attorney General election =

- October 14, 1851

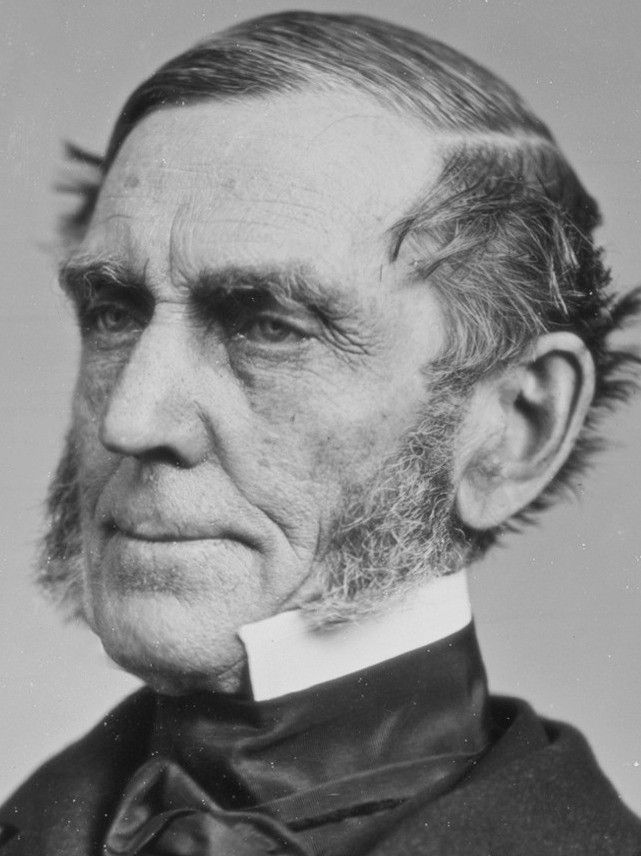
Nominee	George E. Pugh	Henry Stanbery
Party	Democratic	Whig
Popular vote	147,059	119,429
Percentage	52.64%	42.75%
Attorney General before election
Joseph McCormick
Democratic
Elected Attorney General
George E. Pugh
Democratic

The 1851 Ohio Attorney General election was held on October 14, 1851, to elect the Ohio Attorney General. This was the first election held for the position following its conversion from an appointed position with the ratification of the second Ohio constitution. Democratic former Ohio state representative George E. Pugh won the election, defeating Whig former Ohio Attorney General Henry Stanbery by nine percentage points.

== General election ==
=== Candidates ===
- George E. Pugh, former Ohio state representative (1848–1850) (Democratic)
- Henry Stanbery, former Ohio Attorney General (1846–1851) (Whig)
- William A. Rogers (Free Soil)

=== Results ===
1851 Ohio Attorney General election results
Party	Candidate	Votes	%
Democratic	George E. Pugh	147,059	52.64%
Whig	Henry Stanbery	119,429	42.75%
Free Soil	William A. Rogers	12,883	4.61%
Total votes		279,371	100.00%
Democratic hold			
