= Barry Levey =

American politician

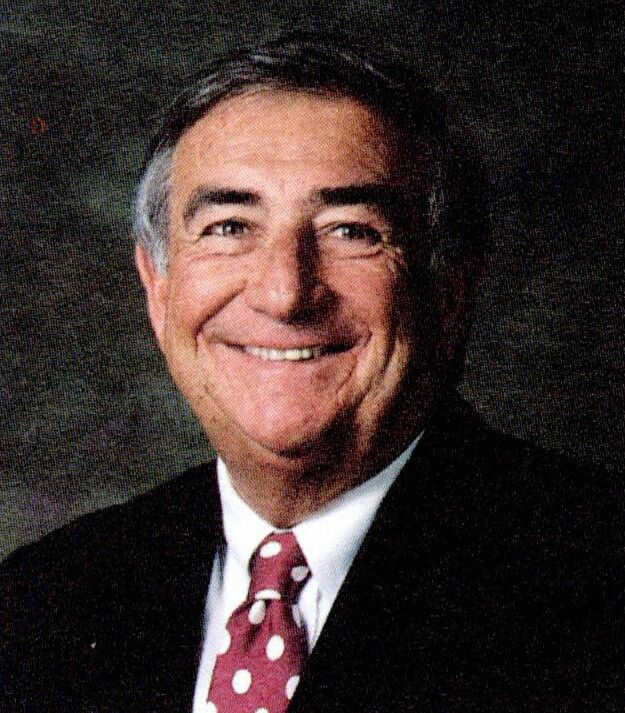

Member of the Ohio Senate from the 4th district
- In office January 4, 1987 – June 30, 1995
- Preceded by: Buz Lukens
- Succeeded by: Scott Nein

Member of the Ohio House of Representatives from the 39th district
- In office January 3, 1963 – December 31, 1970
- Preceded by: Inaugural holder
- Succeeded by: David Armbruster

Personal details
- Born: August 7, 1930
- Died: February 5, 2004 (aged 73) Middletown, Ohio, U.S.
- Party: Republican

Barry Levey (August 7, 1930 – February 5, 2004) was a Republican politician and a former member of the Ohio General Assembly. Levey initially was elected to the Ohio House of Representatives in 1962, representing the entirety of Butler County as an at-large district. He went on to win reelection in 1964. By 1966, the Voting Rights Act of 1965 had required state legislatures to have specific districts, and Levey won a seat to represent the new 39th House District. He was reelected to the seat in 1968. In 1970, Levey opted to not run for reelection to another term.

In 1970, Levey, along with Buz Lukens, was mentioned as a potential successor to Walter E. Powell in the Ohio Senate. However, the seat ultimately went to Lukens. He went on to serve as a trustee for Miami University, and work in private practice as an attorney.

Levey opted to run for Ohio Attorney General in 1986, but lost to incumbent Democrat Anthony Celebrezze. However, following his defeat, Levey was chosen by Ohio Senate Republicans to succeed Buz Lukens, who had been elected to Congress. He was reelected in 1988, and again in 1992.

In 1995, Levey resigned from the Senate, after serving for over eight years. He was succeeded by Scott Nein. He went on to serve as Chairman of First Financial Bancorp, and served until retiring in 2002. He died in 2004 at the age of 73.

Party political offices
Preceded by Charles R. Saxbe	Republican nominee for Attorney General of Ohio; 1986	Succeeded by Paul Pfeifer
