= 1998 Ohio Attorney General election =

- November 3, 1998

Nominee	Betty Montgomery	Richard Cordray
Party	Republican	Democratic
Popular vote	2,037,864	1,240,102
Percentage	62.17%	37.83%
- County results Montgomery: 50–60% 60–70% 70–80% Cordray: 50–60%
Attorney General before election
Betty Montgomery
Republican
Elected Attorney General
Betty Montgomery
Republican

The 1998 Ohio Attorney General election was held on November 3, 1998, to elect the Ohio Attorney General. Republican incumbent Ohio Attorney General Betty Montgomery defeated Democratic challenger Solicitor General of Ohio Richard Cordray in a landslide, securing 62.17% of the vote.

== Republican primary ==
=== Candidates ===
- Betty Montgomery, incumbent Ohio Attorney General (1995–2003)

=== Campaign ===
The Republican primary was held on May 3, 1998. Montgomery won renomination without opposition.

=== Results ===
Republican primary results
Party	Candidate	Votes	%
Republican	Betty Montgomery	650,176	100%
Total votes		650,176	100.00%

== Democratic primary ==
=== Candidates ===
- Richard Cordray, Solicitor General of Ohio (1993–1995)

=== Campaign ===
The Democratic primary was held on May 3, 1998. Cordray won the Democratic nomination unopposed.

=== Results ===
Democratic primary results
Party	Candidate	Votes	%
Democratic	Richard Cordray	596,239	100%
Total votes		596,239	100.00%

== General election ==
=== Candidates ===
- Betty Montgomery, incumbent Ohio Attorney General (1995–2003) (Republican)
- Richard Cordray, Solicitor General of Ohio (1993–1995) (Democratic)

=== Results ===
1998 Ohio Attorney General election results
Party	Candidate	Votes	%	±%
Republican	Betty Montgomery	2,037,864	62.17%	+10.81%
Democratic	Richard Cordray	1,240,102	37.83%	−10.8%
Total votes		3,277,966	100.00%	
Republican hold		Swing		
