= Leigh Herington =

American politician

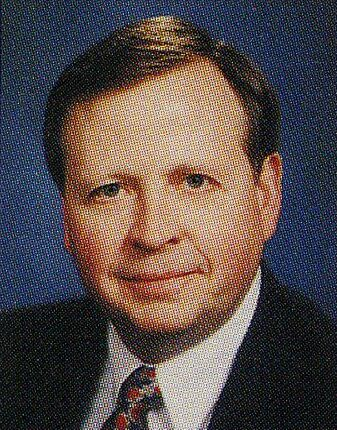

Minority Leader of the Ohio Senate
- In office 1999 – February 28, 2002
- Preceded by: Ben Espy
- Succeeded by: Greg DiDonato

Member of the Ohio Senate from the 28th district
- In office March 31, 1995 – August 31, 2003
- Preceded by: Bob Nettle
- Succeeded by: Kimberly Zurz

Personal details
- Party: Democratic

Leigh E. Herington is an Ohio Democratic politician and a former member of the Ohio Senate. Herington was a long-serving local attorney and Chairman of the Portage County Democratic Party when appointed to replace Senator Bob Nettle in 1995, who had resigned. Up for election in 1996, Herington easily defended his seat in the primary battle against Barbara Sykes, and went on to win the general election. Easily winning reelection in 2000, Senate colleagues soon after voted to make Herington minority leader, the highest post in the caucus. In 2002, Herington was mentioned as a potential candidate for Ohio Governor, but declined.

Facing term limits in 2004, Herington announced in 2002 that he would run for Ohio Attorney General. He ended up losing to incumbent Jim Petro. Soon after, in 2003, Herington resigned from the Senate, citing term limits and the desire to run for a Portage County judicial position. Herington went on to lose a bid for Portage County Common Pleas Judge. He has since served in various aspects of the community, notably for NOPEC.

Party political offices
Preceded by Richard Cordray	Democratic nominee for Attorney General of Ohio; 2002	Succeeded by Marc Dann
