= Robert P. Kennedy =

American politician

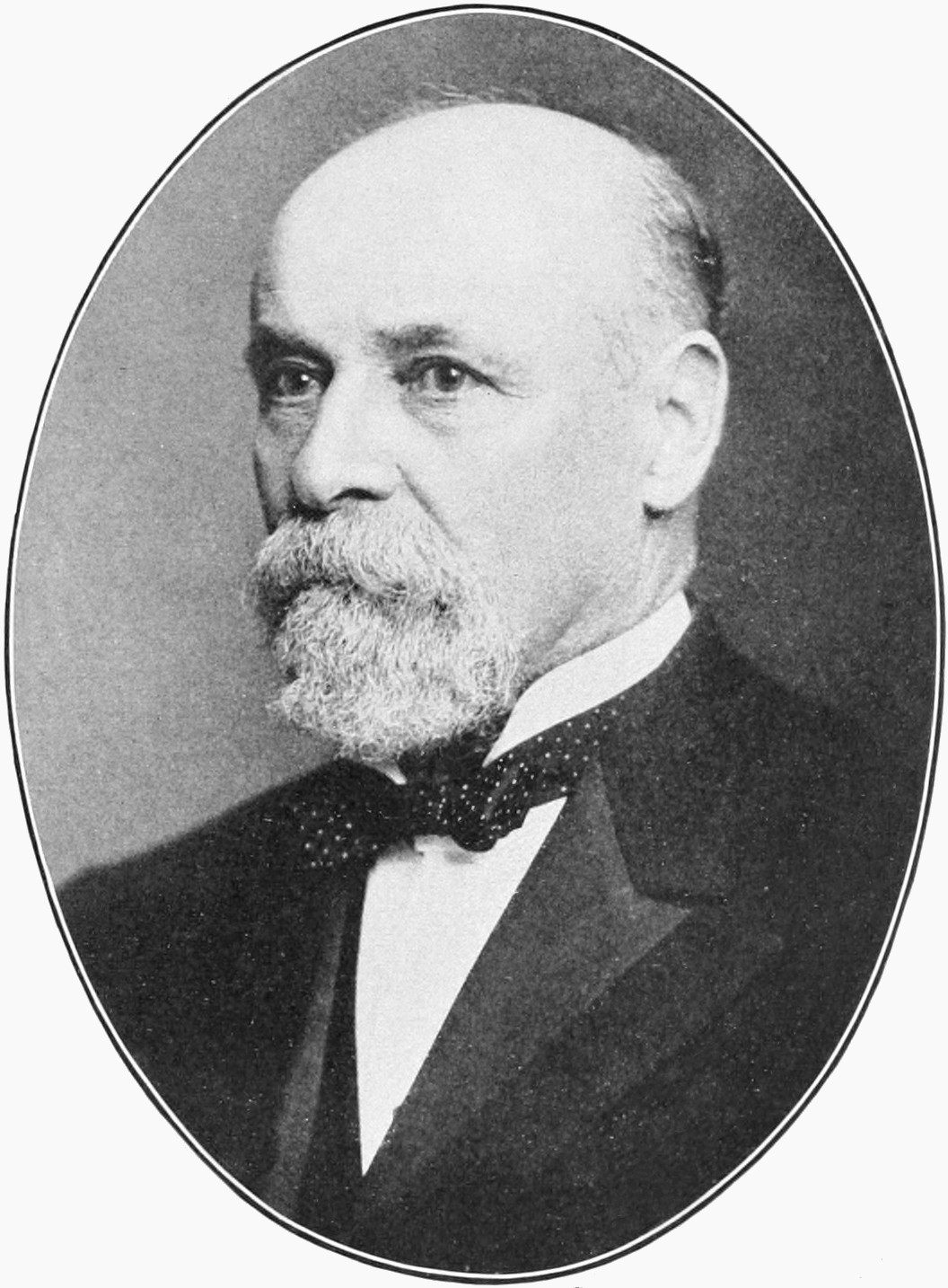

18th Lieutenant Governor of Ohio
- In office January 11, 1886 – March 3, 1887
- Governor: Joseph B. Foraker
- Preceded by: John George Warwick
- Succeeded by: Silas A. Conrad

Member of the U.S. House of Representatives from Ohio's 8th district
- In office March 4, 1887 – March 3, 1891
- Preceded by: John Little
- Succeeded by: Darius D. Hare

Personal details
- Born: Robert Patterson Kennedy; January 23, 1840 Bellefontaine, Ohio, U.S.
- Died: May 6, 1918 (aged 78) Bellefontaine, Ohio, U.S.
- Resting place: Bellefontaine Cemetery, Bellefontaine, Ohio
- Party: Republican
- Spouses: Maria Lewis Gardner; Emma Mendenhall
- Children: four
- Education: Geneva College; Yale University
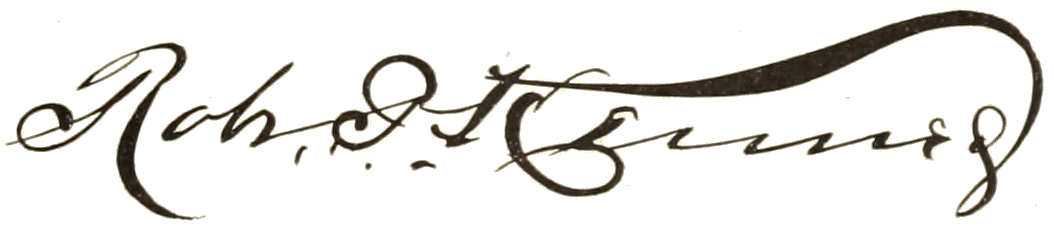
- Signature

Robert Patterson Kennedy (January 23, 1840 – May 6, 1918) was a U.S. representative from Ohio from 1886 to 1891. He was also an officer in the Union Army during the American Civil War.

== Biography ==
Born in Bellefontaine, Ohio, Kennedy attended the public schools and Geneva College in Northwood, Ohio. He was studying at Yale University when the American Civil War broke out.

== Civil War ==
He was commissioned as a second lieutenant in the 23rd Ohio Infantry on June 11, 1861. He served as a captain and assistant adjutant general dating from October 7, 1862, and was promoted to major and assistant adjutant general on November 16, 1864. He resigned on April 8, 1865.

=== Later military service ===
Kennedy was commissioned as colonel of the 196th Ohio Infantry, on April 14, 1865. He was brevetted as lieutenant colonel of volunteers and brigadier general of volunteers, both dating from March 13, 1865.

== Political career ==
Upon the end of the war and his resignation from the volunteer army, Kennedy returned to Bellefontaine. He studied law with judge William H. West. He was admitted to the bar in 1866 and commenced practice in Bellefontaine. He was appointed by President Rutherford B. Hayes as collector of internal revenue for the fourth district of Ohio, serving from 1878 to 1883. He was the lieutenant governor of Ohio from 1885 to 1887.

=== Congress ===
Kennedy was elected from Ohio's 8th District as a Republican to the Fiftieth and Fifty-first Congresses (March 4, 1887 – March 4, 1891). He was not a candidate for renomination in 1890.

=== Later career ===
He was appointed by President William McKinley in 1899 as a member of the Insular Commission, which was directed to investigate and report upon conditions existing in Cuba and Puerto Rico and served as its president.

== Death ==
Robert P. Kennedy died in Columbus, Ohio in 1918 at the age of 78.

== Private life and family ==
Kennedy was a member of the Grand Army of the Republic, a Scottish Rite Freemason, and a member of the Presbyterian Church. He was married on December 29, 1862 at Bellefontaine to Maria Lewis Gardner of that city. She died in 1893, leaving four children. He married at Wabash, Indiana to Emma (Cowgill) Mendenhall of that city on September 4, 1894. She survived him.

Despite his name and profession, he was not related to the Kennedy political family.

Kennedy was the author of The Historical Review of Logan County, Ohio, published in 1903 by The S. J. Clarke Publishing Co., Chicago.

Political offices
Preceded by John G. Warwick	Lieutenant Governor of Ohio; 1886–1887	Succeeded by Silas A. Conrad
U.S. House of Representatives
Preceded by John Little	United States Representative from Ohio's 8th congressional district 1887–1891	Succeeded by Darius D. Hare
