= Marc Dann =

American politician

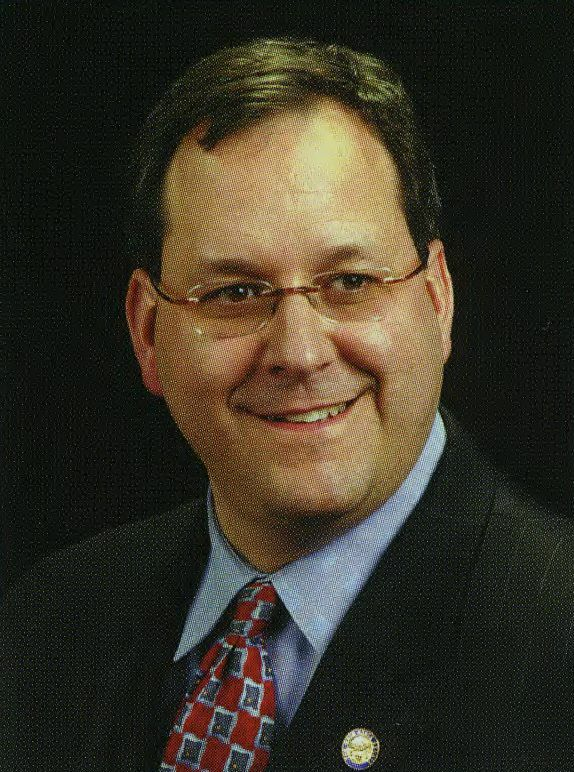
- Dann in 2006

47th Attorney General of Ohio
- In office January 8, 2007 – May 14, 2008
- Governor: Ted Strickland
- Preceded by: Jim Petro
- Succeeded by: Nancy H. Rogers

Member of the Ohio Senate from the 32nd district
- In office January 6, 2003 – December 31, 2006
- Preceded by: Tim Ryan
- Succeeded by: Capri Cafaro

Personal details
- Born: Marc Edward Dann; March 12, 1962 (age 64) Evanston, Illinois, U.S.
- Party: Democratic
- Spouse(s): Alyssa Lenhoff (m. 1987; div. 2010) Kathy Clingerman
- Children: 3
- Education: University of Michigan (BA); Case Western Reserve University (JD)
- Profession: Attorney

Marc Edward Dann (born March 12, 1962) is an American attorney and former politician. A member of the Democratic Party, he served in the Ohio State Senate from 2003 to 2006 and as the 47th attorney general of Ohio from January 2007 until his resignation in May 2008.

Born in Evanston, Illinois, Dann grew up in Shaker Heights, Ohio. After graduating from the University of Michigan and Case Western Reserve University School of Law, he began his legal career in Youngstown, Ohio, as a bankruptcy and divorce attorney. Throughout the 1980s and 1990s, he also worked on several Democratic Party political campaigns. In 2001, Dann won his first election to public office to the Liberty Township school board. Then in 2002, he was elected to the Ohio State Senate. As state senator, he was most noted for his criticism of Ohio state officials involved in the Coingate scandal.

After winning election in 2006, he was sworn in as Ohio attorney general on January 14, 2007. However, his time in office would be short-lived after sexual harassment allegations against multiple staffers and the revelation of an extramarital affair on his part. This scandal led to Dann resigning on May 14, 2008; he returned to private practice.

== Early life and career ==
Born in 1962 in Evanston, Illinois, Dann grew up in Shaker Heights, Ohio. While in high school, he became in interested in Democratic Party politics and volunteered for the Ohio House of Representatives campaign of Lee Fisher. He later worked for Jimmy Carter's 1980 presidential campaign.

Dann earned a B.A. in 1984 from the University of Michigan and a J.D. degree in 1987 from Case Western Reserve University. After law school, he worked for Gary Hart's 1988 campaign for president. In 1991, Dann moved to Youngstown, Ohio, to open a private law practice specializing in divorce and bankruptcy.

== Political career ==
In the 1990s, Dann worked for the campaigns of Mary O. Boyle for U.S. Senate and Bob Hagan for Ohio State Senate.

Dann ran for the Ohio state Senate in the district then comprising Trumbull and Geauga counties. He finished third in the party primary behind eventual winner Tim Ryan and a local township trustee. From 2001 to 2002, Dann served as a member of the Liberty Local School District board of education.

After Ryan won election to the Ohio State Senate in 2002, Dann convinced the state Senate's Democratic caucus to appoint him to fill the balance of Ryan's term. He easily won election to a full term in 2004. He was reprimanded in 2004 by the Ohio Supreme Court for handling a 2002 alimony case without proper preparation.

Dann was a leading figure in the exposure of a variety of ethics and criminal scandals in the administration of Republican Governor Bob Taft, who became the first sitting governor in Ohio history to plead guilty to a crime. Dann was a leading critic of "Coingate," an investment plan in which $50 million of the state's workers compensation reserve fund was given to Republican Tom Noe, a politically connected coin dealer. When the Coingate scandal broke, Taft, who was a regular golf partner of Noe's, denied having knowledge of the Bureau of Workers Compensation (BWC) decision to invest money in Noe's coin funds. Dann was initially denied by the BWC in a request to see examples of state money to buy rare coins. He then sued to see memos, e-mails, and other communications transmitted between Gov. Taft's office and the BWC.

Dann was a vociferous critic of then-Attorney General Jim Petro, a Republican, who had been notified by the Securities and Exchange Commission more than two years earlier that the SEC had serious reservations about investment practices at the BWC. Dann charged that Petro ignored those warnings and the misuse of funds at the agency continued unabated until the Toledo Blade and Dann began to expose the corruption.

== Attorney general ==
Dann announced his candidacy for attorney general of Ohio on November 14, 2005, saying he would use the office to help local police and prosecutors deal with street crime, and to actively and aggressively pursue white collar criminals.

Dann won 71% of the vote in the Democratic primary against former Cleveland Law Director Subodh Chandra. He won the general election in November 2006 by upsetting Ohio State Auditor Betty Montgomery, a former attorney general. In the general-election campaign, Montgomery tried to distance herself from the scandals of the Taft administration, while criticizing Dann for wanting to use the attorney general's office as a platform for activism.

In a television advertisement, the Montgomery campaign attacked Dann for the above-mentioned 2004 reprimand and for defending a man convicted of showing nude pictures to children. He responded to the latter attack by saying he was simply doing his job as an attorney.

Dann received 2.04 million votes to 1.83 million for Montgomery, a margin of 52% to 48%. He ran up huge margins in traditionally Republican areas, and also won bellwether counties such as Franklin and Stark. Before her defeat by Dann, Montgomery had never lost a statewide election and had been the top Republican vote-getter in the previous two non-presidential statewide contests. Dann was sworn in as the 47th Ohio Attorney General on January 8, 2007.

== Controversies ==
Dann had been questioned by some for supporting Capri Cafaro's successful bid to fill Dann's unexpired term in the state Senate. Cafaro, heiress to part of the Cafaro shopping-mall empire, had never won election to office. In addition, Cafaro's father, J. J. Cafaro, had pleaded guilty in 2001 to bribing then-Congressman Jim Traficant to push legislation that would benefit his aviation-equipment company. Capri, then in her early 20s, was president of the aviation company but was not charged with any wrongdoing. In a related trial, Capri testified she had never conspired with Traficant.

As of October 18, 2006, the Cafaro family had contributed $30,500 to Dann's campaign for attorney general, in addition to the $26,000 they had donated to his state Senate campaigns. Of that money, $10,000 came from J. J. Cafaro.

Dann defended his recommendation of Capri Cafaro by saying he believed she was the only qualified candidate to replace him.

Dann faced criticism from the Mansfield News Journal and others for telling (Warren, Ohio) Tribune Chronicle reporter Steve Oravecz to "go... fuck yourself" at a fundraiser for Democratic presidential candidate Barack Obama.

According to the Associated Press, the attorney general's office missed a legal deadline to join an appeal of a Medicaid-related court decision the state government opposes. The deadline for filing the documents was Dann's inauguration day. The failure to join the appeal does not prevent the state from filing briefs in the case.

=== Sexual harassment scandal ===
A sexual harassment scandal arose during Dann's tenure as attorney general, eventually leading to his resignation. The investigation focused on allegations of sexual harassment filed by two women, Cindy Stankoski and Vanessa Stout, who worked in Dann's office under the supervision of Anthony Gutierrez, Dann's director of general services. In April 2008, Dann placed Communications Director Leo Jennings on paid leave pending the outcome of the ongoing investigation in his office, along with Gutierrez, pending the outcome of the investigation. Jennings and Gutierrez were non-attorney friends of Dann's from Youngstown; the three shared a condominium in Columbus.

Stankoski and Stout alleged that Gutierrez, who was paid $87,500 a year, repeatedly sexually harassed them. A statement from Dann released to reporters gave no details on what led to Jennings being included in the investigation. It said only: "This action comes as a result of new information received over the weekend related to the ongoing investigation into charges of sexual harassment." Dann agreed to conditionally release emails between himself and his former scheduler, Jessica Utovich. Utovich, 28, began as Dann's scheduler, but was transferred to the position of director of travel in late 2007. Upon being transferred, Utovich received a 27% pay raise.

=== Extramarital affair and resignation ===
On May 2, 2008, following the firing and resignation of a number of his aides in a sexual harassment scandal, Dann admitted that he had had an extramarital affair with an unidentified subordinate in his office. However, he initially refused to resign, saying his admission and punishment were enough. In the wake of his admission, a number of Ohio papers called for Dann to resign, and the Tribune Chronicle apologized to its readers for their endorsement of Dann during the 2006 election.

On May 4, 2008, the three largest Ohio newspapers ran editorials condemning Dann. The Plain Dealer (Cleveland, Ohio) opined that "Dann has turned the attorney general's office into a laughingstock" and "it's impossible to see how he can recover" The Columbus Dispatch said Dann was "not fit to serve", and the Cincinnati Enquirer called for his resignation.

The Plain Dealer had previously reported on statements by Republicans that if Dann would not step down, they could try to impeach him. On the evening of May 5, Democratic Governor Strickland issued a statement which appeared to support Dann's impeachment should he decide not to resign. Dann showed no interest in departure, even after Strickland's statement.

On May 5, 2008, the Columbus Dispatch reported that seven separate investigations were either underway or being considered in response to misconduct at the attorney general's office. On May 10, 2008, the Ohio Democratic Party voted to remove their endorsement of Dann, remove him of his membership in the Ohio Democratic Party Executive Committee, and call for his immediate resignation as attorney general. On May 12, 2008, articles of impeachment were filed with 42 of the 45 Democrats in the state house supporting the nine counts. At a May 14, 2008, press conference in Columbus, Dann resigned the office of attorney general of Ohio.

In March 2009, Dann and his campaign were each fined $1,000 by the Ohio Elections Commission for violating campaign-finance laws by using his political account for personal cell phones for his family and for security renovations to his Youngstown-area home. In June 2009, he reached a plea agreement with the Ohio Inspector General, Thomas P. Charles, in which he pled guilty to a single count of misuse of campaign funds, for purchasing travel for family members to San Francisco for a vacation that was to be packaged with a political fundraiser, and paid another fine of $1000; the Commission agreed to accept the plea deal by a 5 to 1 vote.

Prior to filing criminal charges against Dann's associates, including Leo Jennings, Anthony Gutierrez and Edgar Simpson, Charles filed complaints against Dann with the Elections Commission, alleging that he illegally used his political account to pay Leo Jennings, who used the money to pay for rent and utilities for the condominium they shared with Anthony Gutierrez. Following a trial regarding different allegations relating to his tenure in Dann's office, Gutierrez was ultimately sentenced to 45 days in jail.

Dann was suspended from the practice of law by the Ohio Supreme Court effective November 20, 2012, and was reinstated effective June 11, 2013. He now has a private legal practice in Cleveland, Ohio, reportedly specializing in combating home foreclosures.

== Later career ==
After his political career ended, Dann returned to legal work pro bono defending homeowners against foreclosures. In 2008, he founded DannLaw, a firm specializing in bankruptcy, foreclosure, and other financial matters.

In 2025, a profile in The Columbus Dispatch reported that Dann represented retired public school teachers suing Ohio over changes to the state pension system and won an appeals court case ordering Ohio to reinstate nearly $900 million in unemployment aid.

== Personal ==
From 1987 until their divorce in 2010, Dann was married to journalist Alyssa Lenhoff. They had three children. Marc Dann later married Kathy Clingerman.

Ohio Senate
Preceded by Tim Ryan	Member of the Ohio Senate from the 32nd district January 6, 2003 – December 31, 2006	Succeeded by Capri Cafaro
Party political offices
Preceded by Leigh Herington	Democratic nominee for Attorney General of Ohio; 2006	Succeeded by Richard Cordray
Legal offices
Preceded by Jim Petro	Attorney General of Ohio; January 8, 2007 – May 14, 2008	Succeeded by Nancy Rogers
