= Robert E. Sweeney =

American politician (1924–2007)

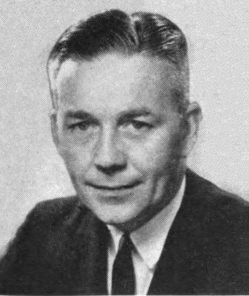

Member of the U.S. House of Representatives from Ohio's at-large district
- In office January 3, 1965 – January 3, 1967
- Preceded by: Robert Taft Jr.
- Succeeded by: District Eliminated

Personal details
- Born: November 4, 1924 Cleveland, Ohio
- Died: June 30, 2007 (aged 82) Gates Mills, Ohio
- Resting place: Calvary Cemetery (Cleveland, Ohio)
- Party: Democratic
- Education: Baldwin-Wallace College; Georgetown University; Cleveland State University

Military service
- Allegiance: United States
- Branch/service: United States Army
- Years of service: 1943-1946
- Battles/wars: World War II

Robert E. Sweeney (November 4, 1924 – June 30, 2007) was a U.S. representative from Ohio and a son of another congressman, Martin L. Sweeney.

== Early life ==
Sweeney was born in the West Park neighborhood of Cleveland, Ohio and graduated from that city's Saint Ignatius High School.

He attended Georgetown University in Washington, D.C.; Baldwin-Wallace College in Berea, Ohio; and Cleveland-Marshall Law School in Cleveland, where he studied law despite the discouragement of his father.

=== World War II ===
Sweeney joined the Army during World War II and served from 1943 until 1946.

=== Early career ===
In 1951, Sweeney was admitted to the bar and began practicing law in Cleveland, Ohio. During his early law career, he served as the assistant director of law for Cleveland from 1951 until 1954.

He later served as a special to the Attorney General of Ohio from 1958 until 1962.

== Political career ==
Sweeney was the Democratic nominee for Attorney General of Ohio in 1962 but was defeated in the general election that November.

Sweeney was elected as a Democrat in 1964 to an at-large seat to the United States House of Representatives. He served just one term, the Eighty-ninth Congress, January 3, 1965 – January 3, 1967.

After Ohio switched to electing members of Congress by districts beginning in 1966, Sweeney decided to forgo a re-election bid and sought the Attorney General's office an additional time. As in 1962, he won the Democratic nomination but fell short in November. He then resumed the practice of law.

Sweeney was appointed in 1976 to an unexpired term on the Cuyahoga County Commission. He was subsequently elected to a full term in 1977. In 1980, he lost his seat on the commission after losing his bid for re-election.

During his tenure as a county commissioner, he was a supporter of regional government, helped establish Cuyahoga's public defender's office and the solid-waste district. He also was a primary advocate for the renovation of the Playhouse Square Center.

== Later life ==
Sweeney was one of the first lawyers to bring forward a lawsuit related to asbestos. During his research, he discovered an incriminating document that showed that the manufacturers of asbestos had been aware of its dangers for half a century but conspired to conceal the information from the public. As a result of large settlements from the asbestos manufacturers, he would go on to earn millions of dollars.

Sweeney was instrumental in the placement of the so-called "Irish plank" into the Democratic platform at the 1992 Democratic National Convention.

=== Illness and death ===
Sweeney's health sharply declined after suffering a major heart attack in 1999.

Sweeney died at the age of 82 on June 30, 2007, at his home in Gates Mills, Ohio, a Cleveland suburb, after suffering from a variety of ailments.

He was survived by his second wife, Kathryn; his first wife Patricia and their 13 children, Robert, Daniel, William, Martin, John, James, Thomas, Mary Brigid, Alice Marie, Edward, Patrica, Eileen and Catherine; 37 grandchildren, and 15 great-grandchildren; and two stepchildren from his second marriage.

Party political offices
Preceded by Mark McElroy	Democratic nominee for Attorney General of Ohio; 1962, 1966	Succeeded by William J. Brown
U.S. House of Representatives
Preceded by Robert Taft, Jr.	Member of the U.S. House of Representatives from Ohio's at-large congressional district 1965–1967	District eliminated
