= Charles R. Saxbe =

American politician

Member of the Ohio House of Representatives from the 75th district
- In office January 3, 1975 – December 31, 1982
- Preceded by: Charles Fry
- Succeeded by: Joan Lawrence

Personal details
- Born: November 2, 1946 (age 79) Urbana, Ohio, U.S.
- Party: Republican
- Education: Southern Methodist, B.A. Ohio State, J.D.
- Profession: Attorney

Charles Rockwell Saxbe (born November 2, 1946) is an attorney from Ohio and former American politician of the Republican Party. He is the son of former U.S. Attorney General and Senator William B. Saxbe.

== Early life and education ==
Saxbe was born to William and Ardath Louise "Dolly" Kleinhans Saxbe in Urbana, Ohio. He was the youngest of three children and grew up in a small house in nearby Mechanicsburg, Ohio, that his father built.

In 1969, Saxbe earned his bachelor's degree from the Southern Methodist University and then enlisted in the U.S. Marine Corps, where he served as an infantry platoon commander with the First Marine Division during the Vietnam War. He attained the rank of captain by the time he was honorably discharged.

After serving his country, Saxbe earned his Juris Doctor degree from the Ohio State University Moritz College of Law in 1975.

== Political career ==
Saxbe served four terms in the Ohio House of Representatives.

In 1982, he was the Republican nominee for Ohio Attorney General, losing to Anthony J. Celebrezze Jr. by nearly 2 to 1 (2,036,243 to 1,203,797).

== After politics ==
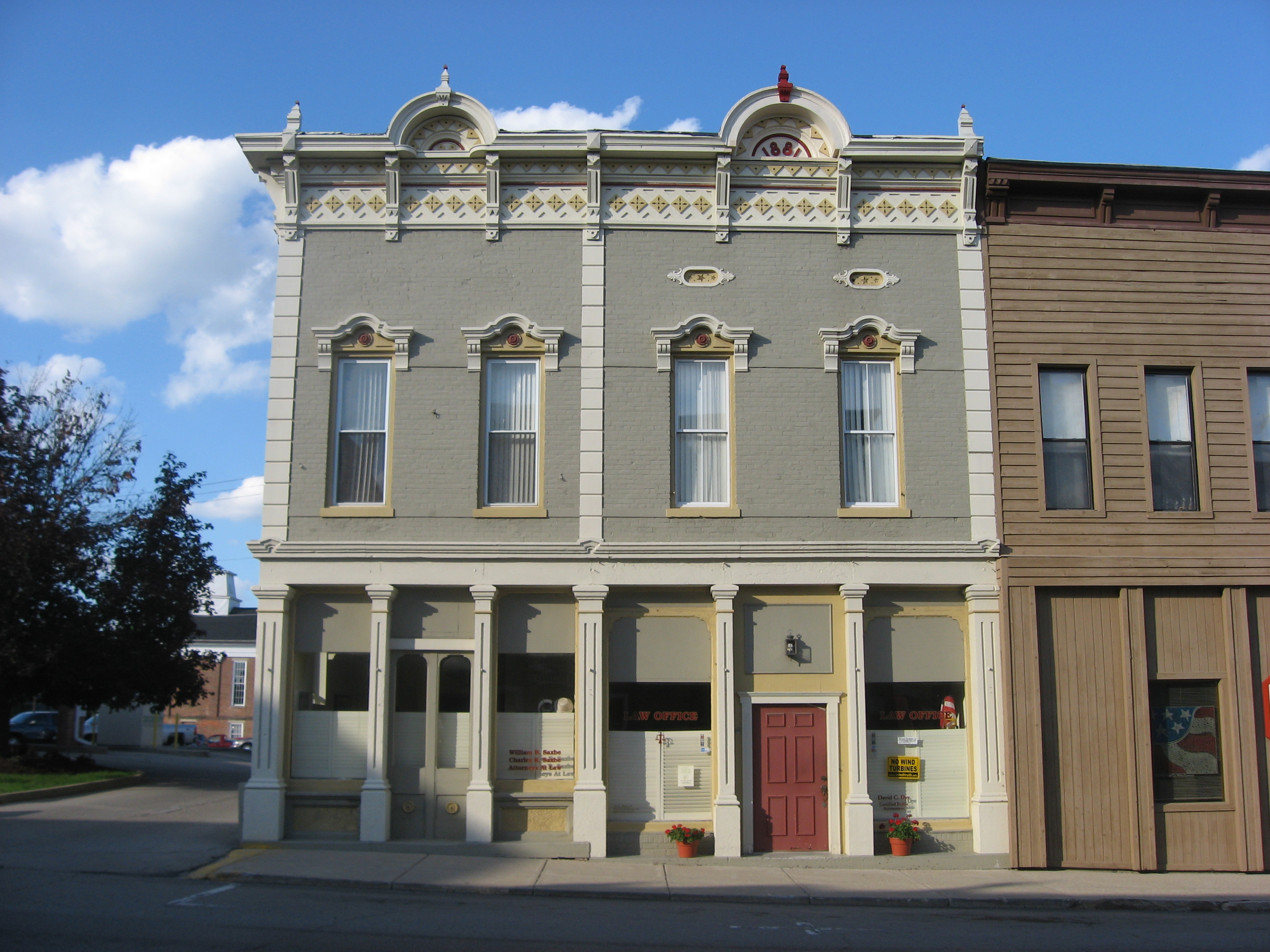
Saxbe's old law offices in Mechanicsburg

Saxbe is currently 'Partner-in-Charge' of the Columbus office of Taft Stettinius & Hollister LLP, a law firm based in Cincinnati, Ohio. Previously, he was the co-managing partner of Chester, Willcox & Saxbe, LLP, a law firm based in Columbus, Ohio. He was also on the Board of Trustees of Central State University in Wilberforce, Ohio.

Party political offices
Preceded by George Curtis Smith	Republican nominee for Attorney General of Ohio; 1982	Succeeded by Barry Levey
