= Ohio Attorney General =

Attorney general for the U.S. state of Ohio

Attorney General of Ohio
- Seal of the attorney general

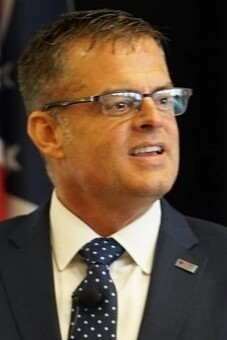
- Incumbent; Andy Wilson since June 7, 2026
- Ohio Department of Justice
- Style: The Honorable
- Term length: Four years, two term limit
- Inaugural holder: Henry Stanbery; 1846
- Formation: Ohio Constitution
- Succession: Seventh
- Salary: $109,554
- Website: Office of the Attorney General

The Ohio attorney general is the chief legal officer of the state of Ohio in the United States. The office is filled by general election, held every four years. The current Ohio attorney general is Republican Andy Wilson. On May 7, 2026, Dave Yost announced he would resign as Attorney General, effective June 7, to join Alliance Defending Freedom, a conservative Christian legal advocacy group. On May 11, Governor Mike DeWine announced that Andy Wilson, Ohio's Public Safety Director, would serve as Interim Attorney General upon Yost's resignation. With the results of the 2026 Ohio Attorney General election, he will be succeeded by John Kulewicz, a member of the Democratic Party. Kulewicz will take office on January 11th, 2027.

== History ==
The office of the attorney general was first created by the Ohio General Assembly by statute in 1846. The attorney general's principal duties were to give legal advice to the state government, to represent the state in legal matters, and to advise the state's county prosecutors. Originally, the attorney general was appointed by the legislature. With the adoption of Ohio's second constitution in 1851, the attorney general became an elected office. The attorney general's duties were drawn very generally at that time.

In 1952, the General Assembly passed a statute that added to the attorney general's responsibilities, including trusteeship over charitable trusts, and legal advice to more government agencies. The act stated that the attorney general could prosecute individuals only if the governor requested so in writing. Starting in 1954, the term of office was increased from two years to four years.

In 2008 Nancy H. Rogers was appointed following the resignation of Marc Dann. A special election was held in 2008 to find a permanent replacement; then–Ohio State Treasurer Richard Cordray (D) beat out Michael Crites (R), and Robert M. Owens (I) for the position.

The Solicitor General of Ohio is the top appellate lawyer in the attorney general's office.

In November 2014, Ohio Attorney General Mike DeWine secured a $22 million settlement from the credit score company ScoreSense, which is owned by the company One Technologies. DeWine had filed civil charges against the company along with the Illinois attorney general and Federal Trade Commission. Ohio consumers and state government will receive a portion of the settlement. According to the FTC, One Technologies "lured customers with "free access" to their credit scores and then billed them a recurring fee of $29.95 per month..." Over 200,000 consumers had filed complaints against the company.

== List of attorneys general of Ohio (1846–present) ==
| Term | Attorney General | Party | Home county | Picture | Notes |
|---|---|---|---|---|---|
| 1846–1851 | Henry Stanbery | Whig | Fairfield | | |
| 1851–1852 | Joseph McCormick | Democratic | Adams | | |
| 1852–1854 | George Ellis Pugh | Democratic | Hamilton | | |
| 1854–1856 | George W. McCook | Democratic | Jefferson | | |
| 1856 | Francis D. Kimball | Republican | Medina | | died |
| 1856–1861 | Christopher Wolcott | Republican | Summit | | |
| 1861–1863 | James Murray | Republican | Wood | | |
| 1863–1865 | Lyman R. Critchfield | Democratic | Holmes | | |
| 1865 | William P. Richardson | Union | Washington | | resigned |
| 1865–1866 | Chauncey N. Olds | Republican | Pickaway | | |
| 1866–1870 | William H. West | Republican | Logan | | |
| 1870–1874 | Francis Bates Pond | Republican | Morgan | | |
| 1874–1878 | John Little | Republican | Greene | | |
| 1878–1880 | Isaiah Pillars | Democratic | Allen | | |
| 1880–1883 | George K. Nash | Republican | Franklin | | |
| 1883–1884 | David Hollingsworth | Republican | Harrison | | |
| 1884–1886 | James Lawrence | Democratic | Cuyahoga | | |
| 1886–1888 | Jacob A. Kohler | Republican | Summit | | |
| 1888–1892 | David K. Watson | Republican | Franklin | | |
| 1892–1896 | John K. Richards | Republican | Lawrence | | |
| 1896–1900 | Frank S. Monnette | Republican | Crawford | | |
| 1900–1904 | John M. Sheets | Republican | Putnam | | |
| 1904–1908 | Wade H. Ellis | Republican | Hamilton | | |
| 1908–1911 | Ulysses G. Denman | Republican | Lucas | | |
| 1911–1915 | Timothy S. Hogan | Democratic | Jackson | | |
| 1915–1917 | Edward C. Turner | Republican | Franklin | | |
| 1917–1919 | Joseph McGhee | Democratic | Jackson | | |
| 1919–1923 | John G. Price | Republican | Franklin | | |
| 1923–1927 | Charles C. Crabbe | Republican | Madison | | |
| 1927–1929 | Edward C. Turner (2nd) | Republican | Franklin | | |
| 1929–1933 | Gilbert Bettman | Republican | Franklin | | |
| 1933–1937 | John W. Bricker | Republican | Franklin | | |
| 1937–1939 | Herbert S. Duffy | Democratic | Franklin | | |
| 1939–1945 | Thomas J. Herbert | Republican | Cuyahoga | | |
| 1945–1949 | Hugh S. Jenkins | Republican | Mahoning | | |
| 1949–1951 | Herbert S. Duffy (2nd) | Democratic | Franklin | | |
| 1951–1957 | C. William O'Neill | Republican | Washington | | |
| 1957–1959 | William B. Saxbe | Republican | Champaign | | |
| 1959–1963 | Mark McElroy | Democratic | Cuyahoga | | |
| 1963–1969 | William B. Saxbe (2nd) | Republican | Champaign | | resigned |
| 1969–1971 | Paul W. Brown | Republican | Franklin | | |
| 1971–1983 | William J. Brown | Democratic | Mahoning | | |
| 1983–1991 | Anthony J. Celebrezze Jr. | Democratic | Cuyahoga | | |
| 1991–1995 | Lee Fisher | Democratic | Cuyahoga | | |
| 1995–2003 | Betty Montgomery | Republican | Wood | | |
| 2003–2007 | Jim Petro | Republican | Cuyahoga | | |
| 2007–2008 | Marc Dann | Democratic | Trumbull | | resigned on May 14, 2008 |
| 2008–2009 | Nancy H. Rogers | Democratic | Franklin | | Did not run in the subsequent special election. |
| 2009–2011 | Richard Cordray | Democratic | Franklin | | |
| 2011–2019 | Mike DeWine | Republican | Greene | | |
| 2019-2026 | Dave Yost | Republican | Franklin | | Resigned to join the Alliance Defending Freedom as its Vice President |
| 2026- | Andy Wilson | Republican | Miami | | Incumbent, Appointed to finish Yost's term |
| 2027– | John Kulewicz | Democratic | Franklin | | Elect |

== Elections ==
The voters of the U.S. state of Ohio elect an attorney general for a four-year term. The winning candidate is shown in bold.

| Year | Democratic | Republican | Other |
|---|---|---|---|
| 2022 | Jeffrey Crossman : 1,647,644 | **Dave Yost** : 2,484,753 | |
| 2018 | Steve Dettelbach : 2,086,715 | **Dave Yost** : 2,276,414 | |
| 2014 | David Pepper : 1,178,426 | **Mike DeWine** : 1,882,048 | |
| 2010 | Richard Cordray : 1,772,728 | **Mike DeWine** : 1,821,414 | Marc Allan Feldman (Libertarian) : 107,521; Robert M. Owens (Constitution) : 130,065 |
| 2008 | **Richard Cordray** : 2,890,953 | Michael Crites : 1,956,252 | Robert M. Owens (I) : 246,002 |
| 2006 | Marc Dann: 2,035,825 | Betty D. Montgomery: 1,833,846 | |
| 2002 | Leigh Herington: 1,123,318 | James M. Petro: 2,007,411 | |
| 1998 | Richard Cordray: 1,240,102 | Betty D. Montgomery: 2,037,864 | |
| 1994 | Lee Fisher: 1,625,247 | Betty D. Montgomery: 1,716,451 | |
| 1990 | Lee Fisher: 1,680,698 | Paul E. Pfeifer: 1,679,464 | |
| 1986 | Anthony J. "Tony" Celebrezze Jr.: 1,821,587 | Barry Levey: 1,222,102 | |
| 1982 | Anthony J. "Tony" Celebrezze Jr.: 2,036,243 | Charles R. Saxbe: 1,203,797 | James L. Schuller: (Libertarian): 81,974 |
| 1978 | William J. Brown: 1,700,262 | George Curtis Smith: 968,220 | |
| 1974 | William J. Brown: 1,645,933 | George Curtis Smith: 1,140,556 | |
| 1970 | William J. Brown: 1,613,926 | John D. Herbert: 1,297,419 | Al Budka (WI): 94 |
| 1966 | Robert E. Sweeney: 1,233,805 | William B. Saxbe: 1,522,038 | |
| 1962 | Robert E. Sweeney: 198,800 | **William B. Saxbe** | |
| 1958 | Mark McElroy: 1,561,575 | William B. Saxbe: 1,466,881 | |
| 1956 | Stephen M. Young: 1,559,742 | William B. Saxbe: 1,719,620 | |
| 1954 | Paul F. Ward: 1,051,364 | C. William O'Neill: 1,335,557 | |
| 1952 | Paul F. Ward: 1,373,114 | C. William O'Neill: 1,871,200 | |
| 1950 | Herbert S. Duffy: 1,246,076 | C. William O'Neill: 1,406,358 | |
| 1948 | Herbert S. Duffy: 1,433,565 | Hugh S. Jenkins: 1,349,516 | |
| 1946 | Harry T. Marshall:134,829 | Hugh S. Jenkins: 173,107 | |
| 1944 | George A. Hurley: 1,407,207 | Hugh S. Jenkins: 1,473,180 | |
| 1942 | Herbert S. Duffy: 665,131 | Thomas J. Herbert: 983,732 | |
| 1940 | George D. Nye: 1,401,627 | Thomas J. Herbert: 1,552,462 | |
| 1926 | Charles B. Zimmerman | **Edward C. Turner** | |
| 1922 | Stephen M. Young : 744,693 | **Charles C. Crabbe** : 780,192 | |
| 1920 | Joseph McGhee : 824,172 | **John G. Price** : 1,058,561 | Joseph W. Sharts : 44,180; George Edwards : 1,720 |
| 1916 | **Joseph McGhee** : 558,719 | Edward C. Turner : 549,169 | Jacob L. Bachman : 38,432; George Hawke : 6,839 |
| 1912 | **Timothy S. Hogan** | Freeman T. Eagleson | Robert R. Nevin (Progressive) |
| 1910 | **Timothy S. Hogan** | Ulysses G. Denman | |
| 1908 | Timothy S. Hogan : 521,819 | **Ulysses G. Denman** : 551,084 | John C. Madden (Soc) : 31,804; George S. Hawke (Pro) : 10,854; John P. Turner (Ind) : 586; Joseph A. Meyer (Peo) : 178; Max Eisenberg (Soc Lab) : 851 |
| 1905 | James A. Rice : 418,954 | **Wade H. Ellis** : 461,402 | John C. Madden (Soc) : 18,669; Walter S. Lister (Pro) : 13,636; James Matthews (Soc Lab) : 1,836 |
| 1903 | Frank S. Monnette : 360,916 | **Wade H. Ellis** : 470,589 | John C. Madden (Soc) : 19,922; Thomas W. Shreve (Pro) : 13,313; Otto Steinhoff (Soc Lab) : 2,145 |
| 1901 | W. B. McCarty | **John M. Sheets** | |
| 1899 | William H. Dore | **John M. Sheets** | |
| 1897 | William H. Dore : 401,338 | **Frank S. Monnette** : 427,337 | Olin J. Ross : 7,585; Cyrus A. Reider : 5,935; Daniel Wilson : 1,512; Charles F. Armistead : 453; John W. Roseborough : 3,112 |
| 1895 | George A. Fairbanks 329,252 | **Frank S. Monnette** 427,485 | |
| 1893 | John P. Bailey 346,707 | **John K. Richards** 422,449 | |
| 1891 | John P. Bailey 345,245 | **John K. Richards** 373,816 | |
| 1889 | Jesse M. Lewis 373,335 | **David K. Watson** 377,140 | |
| 1887 | William H. Leete 327,551 | **David K. Watson** 357,433 | |
| 1885 | James Lawrence 341,762 | **Jacob A. Kohler** 360,802 | |
| 1883 | **James Lawrence** 360,184 | Moses B. Earnhart 347,589 | |
| 1881 | Frank C. Daugherty 287,470 | **George K. Nash** 315,655 | |
| 1879 | Isaiah Pillars 316,778 | **George K. Nash** 336,100 | |
| 1877 | **Isaiah Pillars** 269,506 | George K. Nash 252,155 | |
| 1875 | Thomas E. Powell 292,487 | **John Little** 296,858 | |
| 1873 | Michael A. Daugherty 213,413 | **John Little** 213,983 | |
| 1871 | Edward S. Wallace 218,077 | **Francis Bates Pond** 237,718 | |
| 1869 | John M. Connell 227,903 | **Francis Bates Pond** 235,285 | |
| 1867 | Frank H. Hurd : 240,847 | **William H. West** : 243,449 | |
| 1865 | David M. Wilson : 193,466 | **William H. West** : 225,278 | |
| 1864 | Lyman R. Critchfield : 183,747 | **William P. Richardson** : 238,104 | |
| 1862 | **Lyman R. Critchfield** : 183,232 | Chauncey N. Olds : 178,855 | |
| 1860 | David W. Stambaugh : 189,999 | **James Murray** : 215,277 | |
| 1858 | Durbin Ward : 162,136 | **Christopher Wolcott** : 182,985 | |
| 1856 | Samuel M. Hart : 154,313 | **Christopher Wolcott** : 176,155 | John M. Buselfreed (American); 23,095 |
| 1855 | George W. McCook : 132,216 | **Francis D. Kimball** : 168,868 | |
| 1853 | **George W. McCook** : 149,957 | Cooper K. Watson (Free Soil) : 35,504 | William Harvey Gibson (Whig) : 97,394 |
| 1851 | **George E. Pugh** : 147,059 | William A. Rogers (Free Soil) : 12,883 | Henry Stanbery (Whig) : 119,429 |
