= John D. Herbert =

American lawyer

Ohio State Treasurer
- In office 1963 – January 11, 1971
- Governor: Jim Rhodes; John J. Gilligan
- Preceded by: Joseph T. Ferguson
- Succeeded by: Gertrude Donahey

Personal details
- Born: John David Herbert; September 8, 1930 Columbus, Ohio, U.S.
- Died: March 27, 2017 (aged 86) Cincinnati, Ohio, U.S.
- Party: Republican
- Education: Princeton University

John David Herbert (September 8, 1930 – March 27, 2017) was an American lawyer who served two terms as the Ohio State Treasurer from 1963 to 1971.

A Republican, he was the son of Thomas J. Herbert, who was Governor of Ohio from 1947 to 1949.

In 1970, Herbert won the Republican nomination for Ohio Attorney General, but lost because of his connections to the "Crofters" scandal in which Republicans were accused of steering state investments to campaign contributors. The scandal brought down nearly the entire Republican ticket in 1970 and helped to elect John J. Gilligan to a single term as governor.

Herbert was born in Columbus, Ohio. His father was Thomas J. Herbert who served as Governor of Ohio. He graduated from Culver Military Academy. He then graduated from Princeton University in 1952 and received his law degree from University of Michigan Law School in 1957. He served in the United States Army during Korean conflict. Herbert worked in the office of the Ohio Attorney General as an assistant. From 1961 to 1973, Herbert served as the Ohio State Treasurer and was a Republican. He lived in Cincinnati, Ohio. After he left the office of the Ohio State Treasurer, Herbert was corporate counsel to the Ace Doran Hauling and Rigging Company in Cincinnati. Herbert died at his home in Cincinnati, Ohio.

Party political offices
Preceded by Roger W. Tracy	Republican nominee for Ohio State Treasurer; 1962, 1966	Succeeded by Robin T. Turner
Preceded by William B. Saxbe	Republican nominee for Attorney General of Ohio; 1970	Succeeded by George Curtis Smith
Political offices
Preceded by Joseph T. Ferguson	Ohio State Treasurer; 1963–1971	Succeeded by Gertrude Donahey
