= Mark McElroy (Ohio politician) =

American politician (1906–1981)

39th Ohio Attorney General
- In office January 12, 1959 – January 14, 1963
- Governor: Michael DiSalle
- Preceded by: William B. Saxbe
- Succeeded by: William B. Saxbe

Personal details
- Born: October 16, 1906 Cleveland, Ohio, U.S.
- Died: December 4, 1981 (aged 75)
- Party: Democratic
- Spouse: Marie Niznol
- Education: Kenyon College; Case Western Reserve University School of Law

Mark McElroy (October 16, 1906 – December 14, 1981) was a Democratic politician from Cleveland, Ohio, United States. He served in both houses of the Ohio General Assembly and was Ohio Attorney General from 1959 to 1963.

== Biography ==
McElroy was born in Cleveland, Ohio in 1906. He attended the city schools, and Kenyon College, where he won nine letters in football, baseball and basketball. He was captain and quarterback in 1930 on the Kenyon Lords football team. After graduating, he earned a law degree in 1934 from the Case Western Reserve University School of Law.

Immediately after college, McElroy ran unsuccessfully for the Ohio House of Representatives. He was an active Democrat, serving as ward leader, precinct committeeman, and member of the county executive committee.

Before his election as Ohio Attorney General, McElroy was a member of the Ohio House of Representatives, Ohio State Senate, and Cleveland City Council. He also unsuccessfully challenged Anthony J. Celebrezze for Mayor of Cleveland.

McElroy was elected Attorney General in 1958 in a Democratic landslide, and served one four-year term. He unsuccessfully challenged incumbent governor Michael DiSalle in 1962.

McElroy was married to Marie Niznol in about 1956.

Party political offices
Preceded by Stephen M. Young	Democratic nominee for Attorney General of Ohio; 1958	Succeeded by Robert E. Sweeney
Legal offices
Preceded by William B. Saxbe	Ohio Attorney General; 1959-1963	Succeeded by William B. Saxbe
