= George Curtis Smith =

American judge (1935–2020)

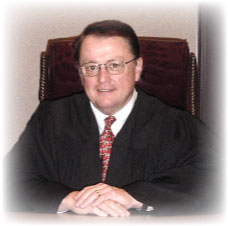

Senior Judge of the United States District Court for the Southern District of Ohio
- In office January 1, 2002 – April 15, 2020

Judge of the United States District Court for the Southern District of Ohio
- In office November 9, 1987 – January 1, 2002
- Appointed by: Ronald Reagan
- Preceded by: Joseph Peter Kinneary
- Succeeded by: Gregory L. Frost

Personal details
- Born: August 8, 1935 Columbus, Ohio, U.S.
- Died: April 15, 2020 (aged 84) Columbus, Ohio, U.S.
- Education: Ohio State University (B.A.); Ohio State University College of Law (J.D.)

George Curtis Smith (August 8, 1935 – April 15, 2020) was a senior United States district judge of the United States District Court for the Southern District of Ohio.

== Education and career ==
Born in Columbus, Ohio, Smith received a Bachelor of Arts degree from Ohio State University in 1957 and a Juris Doctor from Ohio State University College of Law in 1959. He was an assistant city attorney of Columbus from 1959 to 1962, and then an executive assistant to Mayor Ralston Westlake of Columbus from 1962 to 1964. He was an assistant attorney general of Ohio in 1964. He was a chief counsel to the prosecuting attorney of Franklin County from 1965 to 1970, and was himself the prosecuting attorney of that county from 1971 to 1980. He was a judge on the Franklin County Municipal Court from 1980 to 1985, and on the Franklin County Common Pleas Court from 1985 to 1987.

== Federal judicial service ==
On July 1, 1987, Smith was nominated by President Ronald Reagan to a seat on the United States District Court for the Southern District of Ohio vacated by Judge Joseph Peter Kinneary. Smith was confirmed by the United States Senate on November 6, 1987, and received his commission on November 9, 1987. He assumed senior status on January 1, 2002. He died on April 15, 2020, aged 84.

== Sources ==
Party political offices
Preceded by John D. Herbert	Republican nominee for Attorney General of Ohio; 1974, 1978	Succeeded by Charles R. Saxbe
Legal offices
Preceded by Joseph Peter Kinneary	Judge of the United States District Court for the Southern District of Ohio; 1987–2002	Succeeded by Gregory L. Frost
