= David Armbruster (politician) =

American politician (1917–1993)

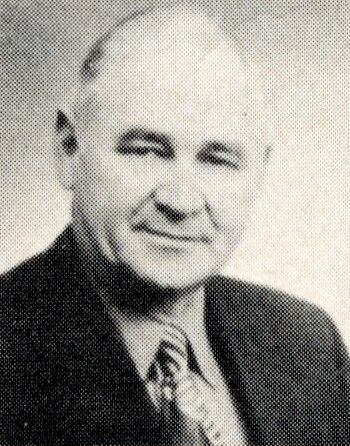

Member of the Ohio House of Representatives from the 39th district
- In office January 3, 1971 – December 31, 1972
- Preceded by: Barry Levey
- Succeeded by: Bill Donham

Personal details
- Born: February 9, 1917 Middletown, Ohio, United States
- Died: October 16, 1993 (aged 76) Middletown, Ohio, United States
- Party: Democratic
- Occupation: florist

David E. Armbruster (February 9, 1917 – October 16, 1993) was a former member of the Ohio House of Representatives and the founder of Armbruster florists in Middletown, Ohio.
