= Betty Montgomery =

American politician

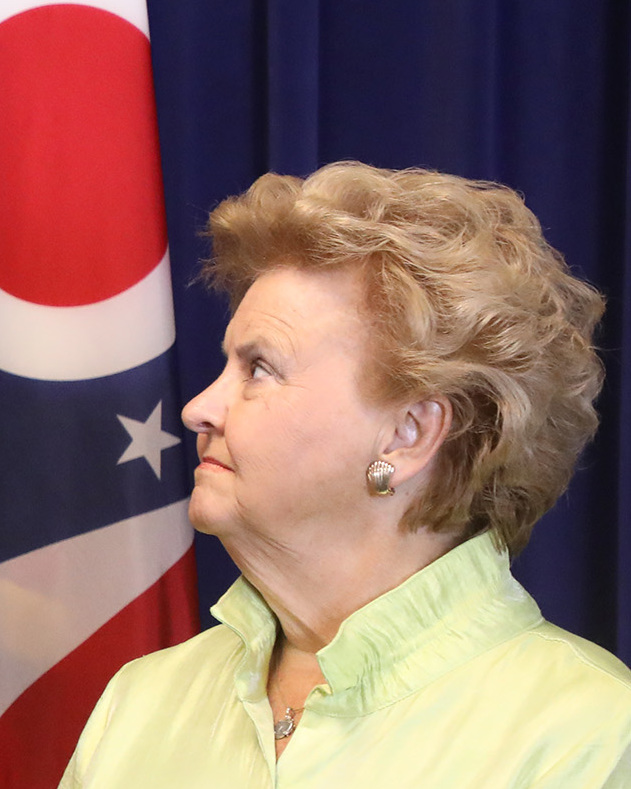
- Montgomery in 2019

30th Auditor of Ohio
- In office January 6, 2003 – January 2, 2007
- Governor: Bob Taft
- Preceded by: Jim Petro
- Succeeded by: Mary Taylor

45th Attorney General of Ohio
- In office January 6, 1995 – January 5, 2003
- Governor: George Voinovich; Nancy Hollister; Bob Taft
- Preceded by: Lee Fisher
- Succeeded by: Jim Petro

Member of the Ohio Senate from the 2nd district
- In office January 3, 1989 – January 3, 1995
- Preceded by: Paul Gillmor
- Succeeded by: Tim Greenwood

Personal details
- Born: April 3, 1948 (age 78)
- Party: Republican
- Education: Bowling Green State University (BA); University of Toledo (JD)

Betty D. Montgomery (born April 3, 1948) is an American politician from the state of Ohio. A Republican, she served as Ohio Attorney General from 1995 to 2003 and as Ohio Auditor of State from 2003 to 2007, becoming the first woman to hold each office.

== Education ==
Montgomery earned a Bachelor of Arts degree from Bowling Green State University and Juris Doctor from the University of Toledo College of Law.

== Career ==
=== County Prosecutor ===
Montgomery was elected Wood County Prosecutor in 1980, becoming the first woman elected county prosecutor in any of Ohio's 88 counties. She served two terms. In 1988, she was elected to the Ohio Senate where she chaired the Criminal Justice Subcommittee and the Senate Judiciary Committee. Montgomery worked on passing Ohio's first living-will law.

=== Attorney General ===
In 1994 Montgomery was urged by Republican Party leaders to challenge Democrat Lee Fisher for the job of Ohio Attorney General. Montgomery was the first Republican attorney general in 24 years to hold the office. She faced an uphill battle against the very-popular Fisher. Montgomery campaigned on her record as a prosecutor. She narrowly defeated Fisher by a vote of 1,716,451 to 1,625,471. As Attorney General, Montgomery worked to increase funding for law enforcement and for more crime labs. She defeated Democrat Richard Cordray for re-election in 1998, earning more votes than any other Republican candidate.

=== Auditor ===
In 2002, Montgomery was term limited from being re-elected Attorney General. Ohio Republican Party Chairman Robert Bennett urged Montgomery to run for the job of state auditor. She swapped offices with then Auditor Jim Petro, who was elected as attorney general. Montgomery defeated Democrat Helen Knipe Smith and became State Auditor in 2003. Montgomery was the top vote-getter in the 1998 and 2002 state elections.

=== 2006 election ===
In 2006, Montgomery opted to run for Ohio Governor. During her campaign for governor, Montgomery challenged Ken Blackwell and Petro. After trailing both Blackwell and Petro in early polls, Montgomery dropped out of the governor's race to once again run for Attorney General. Her 2006 opponent in the general election was State Senator Marc Dann, who defeated Montgomery.

=== Later career ===
Montgomery runs a private law practice and a consulting company. She is the vice-chair of the Bowling Green State University Board of Trustees and serves on several boards and foundations. She is the chair of a leadership institute named after Ohio's first woman speaker of the house, Jo Ann Davidson, that helps develop young, female leaders.

== Awards and recognition ==
Montgomery is recognized for her civic and political achievements and has received awards that include the Robert E. Hughes Memorial Award, the Black Swamp Humanitarian Award, the Ohio Hospice Senator of the Year and the Medical College of Ohio Distinguished Citizen Award.

== See also ==
- List of female state attorneys general in the United States

Ohio Senate
Preceded by Paul Gillmor	Member of the Ohio Senate from the 2nd district January 3, 1989 – December 31, 1994	Succeeded by Tim Greenwood
Party political offices
Preceded by Paul Pfeifer	Republican nominee for Attorney General of Ohio; 1994, 1998	Succeeded by Jim Petro
Preceded by Jim Petro	Republican nominee for Auditor of Ohio; 2002	Succeeded by Mary Taylor
Preceded by Jim Petro	Republican nominee for Attorney General of Ohio; 2006	Succeeded by Mike Crites
Legal offices
Preceded by Lee Fisher	Attorney General of Ohio; January 6, 1995 – January 5, 2003	Succeeded by Jim Petro
Political offices
Preceded by Jim Petro	Auditor of Ohio; January 5, 2003 – January 2, 2007	Succeeded by Mary Taylor
