= William J. Brown (Ohio politician) =

American politician

42nd Attorney General of Ohio
- In office January 11, 1971 – January 10, 1983
- Governor: John Gilligan; Jim Rhodes
- Preceded by: Paul W. Brown
- Succeeded by: Anthony J. Celebrezze Jr.

Personal details
- Born: July 12, 1940 Mahoning County, Ohio, US
- Died: November 3, 1999 (aged 59) Columbus, Ohio, US
- Resting place: Oak Grove Cemetery, Delaware, Ohio, US
- Party: Democratic
- Education: Pettit College of Law

William J. Brown (July 12, 1940 – November 3, 1999) was an American lawyer who was elected as Ohio Attorney General in 1970 and served until leaving office in January 1983.

== Career ==
Brown was from Mahoning County, Ohio. He remained active in Ohio politics through the 1990s. Brown's tenure in office is one of the longest on record for the Ohio Attorney General's office. In 1982, he was defeated in the democratic primary for governor to Richard Celeste.

While in office, Brown emphasized consumer rights and created the state's first Consumer Protection section. Brown also successfully sued General Motors in the late 1970s for failing to disclose that automobile manufacturer deployed Chevrolet-built engines into more expensive Oldsmobile brand cars; the settlement included compensation paid to owners of Oldsmobiles who bought new cars from Oldsmobile dealers in 1977 and 1978 equipped with the Chevrolet V8 engines.

Following his term as Ohio Attorney General, Brown joined the law firm now known as Kegler, Brown, Hill & Ritter, headquartered in Columbus, Ohio. The firm has endowed a scholarship in his name, the William J. Brown Scholarship, at the Pettit College of Law at Ohio Northern University, Brown's alma mater.

The William J. Brown Award Consumer Protection Award and William J. Brown memorial highway are named for him.

Party political offices
Preceded by Robert E. Sweeney	Democratic nominee for Attorney General of Ohio; 1970, 1974, 1978	Succeeded by Anthony J. Celebrezze Jr.
Legal offices
Preceded by Paul W. Brown	Ohio Attorney General; 1971-1983	Succeeded by Anthony J. Celebrezze Jr.
