= Anthony J. Celebrezze Jr. =

American politician (1941–2003)

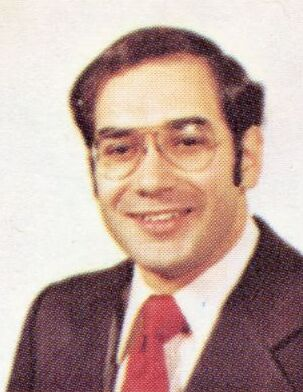

43rd Attorney General of Ohio
- In office January 10, 1983 – January 6, 1991
- Governor: Dick Celeste
- Preceded by: William J. Brown
- Succeeded by: Lee Fisher

45th Secretary of State of Ohio
- In office January 8, 1979 – January 12, 1983
- Governor: Jim Rhodes
- Preceded by: Ted W. Brown
- Succeeded by: Sherrod Brown

Member of the Ohio Senate from the 25th district
- In office January 3, 1975 – December 31, 1978
- Preceded by: Paul Ramon Matia
- Succeeded by: Paul Ramon Matia

Personal details
- Born: Anthony Joseph Celebrezze, Jr. September 8, 1941 Cleveland, Ohio, U.S.
- Died: July 4, 2003 (aged 61) De Graff, Ohio, U.S.
- Party: Democratic
- Spouse: Louisa Godwin
- Children: 5
- Education: United States Naval Academy; Cleveland State University College of Law (JD)
- Occupation: Politician, attorney

Anthony Joseph "Tony" Celebrezze Jr. (September 8, 1941 – July 4, 2003) was an American politician of the Democratic party, who served as Ohio Attorney General, Ohio Secretary of State and an Ohio State Senator. He was the son of Anthony J. Celebrezze, and part of the Celebrezze political dynasty, which was prominent in Cleveland in particular and statewide in Ohio throughout the second half of the 20th century and early 2000s.

== Early life and education ==
Anthony Joseph Celebrezze was born to Anthony J. Celebrezze and Anne M. Celebrezze in 1941. Tony was the oldest of three, along with sisters Jean Ann (Celebrezze) Porto, and Susan Marie (Celebrezze) Sullivan.

Anthony Joseph Celebrezze graduated from John Marshall High School in Cleveland, Ohio. In 1963, Tony graduated from the United States Naval Academy. Tony served in the United States Navy for five years and was awarded the Navy Commendation Medal. In 1974, Anthony Joseph Celebrezze was awarded a Juris Doctor degree from Cleveland State University.

== Political career ==
=== Ohio state senator ===
Anthony Joseph Celebrezze was elected an Ohio state senator in 1974. While in the Ohio General Assembly, Tony was known for his honesty and fair dealing. In 1978, Anthony Joseph Celebrezze defeated incumbent Republican Ted W. Brown in the election for Ohio Secretary of State. Tony served as Ohio secretary of state from 1979 to 1983.

=== Attorney general ===
In 1982, Anthony Joseph Celebrezze ran for Ohio Attorney General, facing off against by Republican Charles R. Saxbe, a member of the Ohio House of Representatives. Both were the sons of former Presidential Cabinet members with good name recognition. Tony would beat Saxbe by a margin of nearly two-to-one (2,036,243 to 1,203,797).

Anthony Joseph Celebrezze easily won re-election in 1986 by defeating Barry Levey, 1,821,587 to 1,222,102. While serving as attorney general, Anthony Joseph Celebrezze fought a legal battle against the United States Department of Energy over the nuclear and chemical pollution at the Fernald nuclear weapons plant, which for years had been kept secret under the disguise of the Fernald Feed Materials Production Center. The legal victory gave the Ohio state government the right to regulate the clean-up of the site.

=== Run for governor ===
In 1990, Celebrezze ran for governor to replace Richard F. Celeste, who was barred from running for a third consecutive term due to term limits. For lieutenant governor, Celebrezze chose Eugene Branstool, an Ohio state senator who was a mid-state farmer from Utica, Ohio. The pair easily won the Democratic primary over Michael Hugh Lord and Judy Wynn Parker (683,932 to 131,564).

For the general election, Celebrezze faced a formidable Republican foe, George Voinovich, the popular out-going Mayor of Cleveland. Voinovich's running mate was Mike DeWine, a U.S. Congressman from Cedarville, Ohio. Celebrezze lost in a landslide (1,938,103 to 1,539,416). Some analysts attribute his loss, in part, to Celebrezze's much-criticized switch from his long-held pro-life views to a pro-choice position. However, the combination of Voinovich and DeWine was balanced better geographically, whereby Voinovich took the northeast Ohio votes from Celebrezze's natural base and DeWine adding the votes from down-state urban areas in the southeast such as Greater Dayton and Greater Cincinnati.

== After politics ==
Celebrezze was inducted into the Ohio Veterans Hall of Fame in 1998. In April 2001, Celebrezze joined Kegler Brown Hill & Ritter, a law firm based in Columbus, Ohio.

== Personal life ==
Celebrezze and his wife, the former Louisa Godwin, had five children.

Celebrezze died on July 4, 2003, of a heart attack after finishing third in a Legend Car auto race at Shadybowl Speedway in De Graff, Ohio.

Celebrezze's cousins were former Ohio Chief Justice Frank Celebrezze and former Ohio Supreme Court Judge James Celebrezze. Celebrezze was the father of Anthony J. Celebrezze III and the cousin of Ohio appeals court judge Frank D. Celebrezze III. His uncle was Frank D. Celebrezze Sr.

== See also ==
- Ohio gubernatorial elections

Legal offices
Preceded by Ted W. Brown	Ohio Secretary of State; 1979 – 1983	Succeeded by Sherrod Brown
Preceded by William J. Brown	Attorney General of Ohio; 1983 – 1991	Succeeded by Lee Fisher
Party political offices
Preceded by Tony P. Hall	Democratic nominee for Ohio Secretary of State; 1978	Succeeded by Sherrod Brown
Preceded by William J. Brown	Democratic nominee for Attorney General of Ohio; 1982, 1986	Succeeded by Lee Fisher
Preceded by Dick Celeste	Democratic Party nominee for Governor of Ohio; 1990	Succeeded by Rob Burch
