= Jim Petro =

American politician (born 1948)

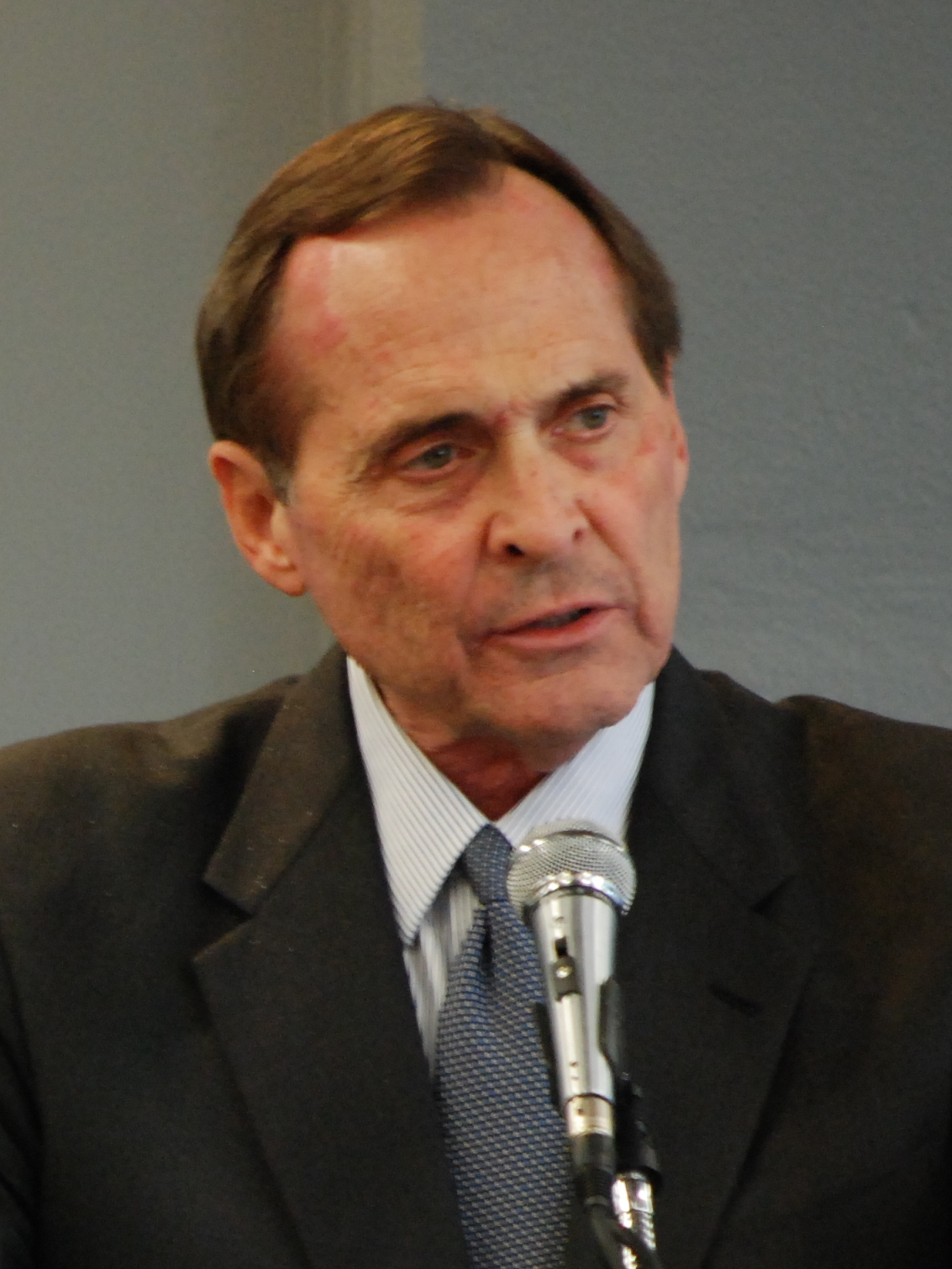
- Petro in 2012

Chancellor of the Ohio Board of Regents
- In office March 14, 2011 – February 1, 2013
- Governor: John Kasich
- Preceded by: Eric Fingerhut
- Succeeded by: John Carey

46th Attorney General of Ohio
- In office January 5, 2003 – January 8, 2007
- Governor: Bob Taft
- Preceded by: Betty Montgomery
- Succeeded by: Marc Dann

Auditor of Ohio
- In office January 9, 1995 – January 5, 2003
- Governor: George Voinovich; Nancy Hollister; Bob Taft
- Preceded by: Thomas E. Ferguson
- Succeeded by: Betty Montgomery

Member of the Ohio House of Representatives from the 6th district
- In office January 2, 1987 – December 31, 1990
- Preceded by: Jeff Jacobs
- Succeeded by: Ed Kasputis
- In office January 3, 1981 – May 22, 1984
- Preceded by: Jim Betts
- Succeeded by: Jeff Jacobs

Personal details
- Born: October 25, 1948 (age 77) Brooklyn, Ohio, U.S.
- Party: Republican
- Education: Denison University (BA); Case Western Reserve University (JD)

James M. Petro (born October 25, 1948) is an American lawyer and politician who was the 46th Ohio Attorney General from 2003 to 2007. A member of the Republican Party, he also served as Ohio State Auditor from 1995 to 2003 and was a candidate for the Republican nomination for governor of Ohio in 2006. Petro was the chancellor of the Ohio Board of Regents from 2011 to 2013.

== Early life and education ==
Petro was born October 25, 1948, in Brooklyn, Ohio. After graduating from Brooklyn High School, he attended Denison University, where he received his Bachelor of Arts degree and joined the Lambda Chi Alpha fraternity. He later earned his Juris Doctor degree from Case Western Reserve University School of Law.

== Career ==
Petro served as an assistant prosecuting attorney in Franklin County, Ohio, as a trial lawyer responsible for felony prosecutions, and then as assistant director of law for the city of Cleveland. After starting his private practice, Petro became prosecuting attorney for the city of Rocky River, Ohio.

Petro began his political career in 1977 when he was elected to the Rocky River city council and later served as the law director of the city. In 1980, he was elected to the Ohio House of Representatives. He served four years as a state representative. In 1991, Petro became a county commissioner for Cuyahoga County; during his four-year term he was president of the board for a year.

Petro was elected Ohio State Auditor in 1994 and re-elected in 1998, serving two terms from 1995 to 2003. As auditor he served as the chief inspector and supervisor of public offices in the state; the office is the largest state auditing agency in the United States, second in size only to the United States Government Accountability Office.

In November 2002, Petro was elected the Ohio attorney general, serving from 2003 to 2007. Petro became the first attorney general in the country to intervene in a case spearheaded by the Innocence Project, a non-profit legal clinic that pioneered the use of DNA testing to prove wrongful conviction, to exonerate Clarence Elkins.

In 2005, Petro became the first Ohio attorney general to argue a case in front of the United States Supreme Court in over thirty years; he won the case by a vote of nine to zero. As Ohio's Attorney General he successfully defended the law banning late term abortions in the state. As attorney general, Petro also launched an effort that added 210,000 criminal DNA profiles from Ohio to the national Combined DNA Index System (CODIS).

Petro was appointed chancellor of the Ohio Board of Regents in March 2011 by Governor John Kasich. The role included leading the University System of Ohio. Petro retired as chancellor in February 2013.

=== 2006 Ohio gubernatorial campaign ===
Petro ran in the Republican primary for the 2006 Ohio gubernatorial election. During his gubernatorial campaign, Petro proposed several higher-education initiatives, including the creation of charter universities and a government-streamlining plan that would direct savings to public universities, allowing tuition to be reduced by as much as 30 percent. He also advocated exploring the creation of a Department of Education to oversee the state's education system from kindergarten through college.

On January 30, 2006, Petro announced that Joy Padgett would be his running mate. Padgett, a Republican state senator from Coshocton, Ohio, was selected after Petro's first running mate, Hamilton County commissioner Phil Heimlich, dropped out of the campaign to run for re-election. Petro was defeated in the May 2, 2006, primary by Ken Blackwell, Ohio's then-secretary of state.

== Publications ==
- Petro, Jim; Petro, Nancy (2011). False Justice: Eight Myths That Convict the Innocent. Kaplan Publishing. ISBN 978-1-60714-467-0.
