= 1864 Ohio Attorney General election =

- October 11, 1864
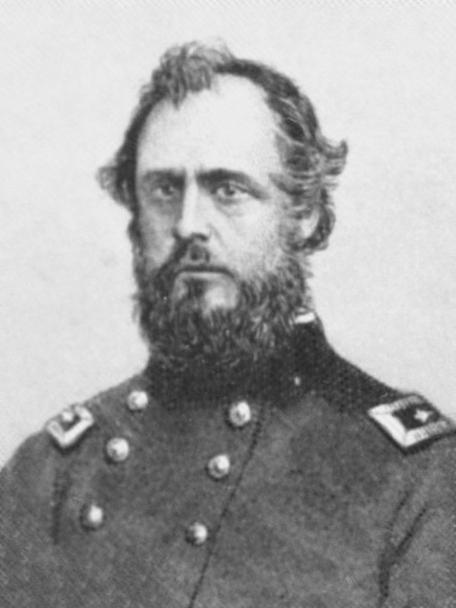

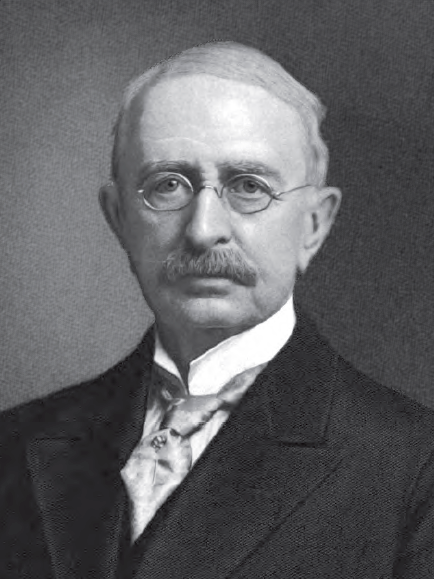
Nominee	William P. Richardson	Lyman R. Critchfield
Party	Republican	Democratic
Popular vote	238,104	183,747
Percentage	56.44%	43.56%
Attorney General before election
Lyman R. Critchfield
Democratic
Elected Attorney General
William P. Richardson
Republican

The 1864 Ohio Attorney General election was held on October 11, 1864, to elect the Ohio Attorney General. Democratic incumbent Lyman R. Critchfield ran for a second term but was defeated by a margin of twelve percentage points by Republican William P. Richardson.

== General election ==
=== Candidates ===
- William P. Richardson, colonel and lawyer (Republican)
- Lyman R. Critchfield, incumbent Ohio Attorney General (1863–1865)

=== Results ===
1864 Ohio Attorney General election results
Party	Candidate	Votes	%	±%
Republican	William P. Richardson	238,104	56.44%	+7.04%
Democratic	Lyman R. Critchfield	183,747	43.56%	−7.04%
Total votes		421,851	100.00%	
Republican gain from Democratic				
