= 1865 Ohio Attorney General special election =

- October 10, 1865
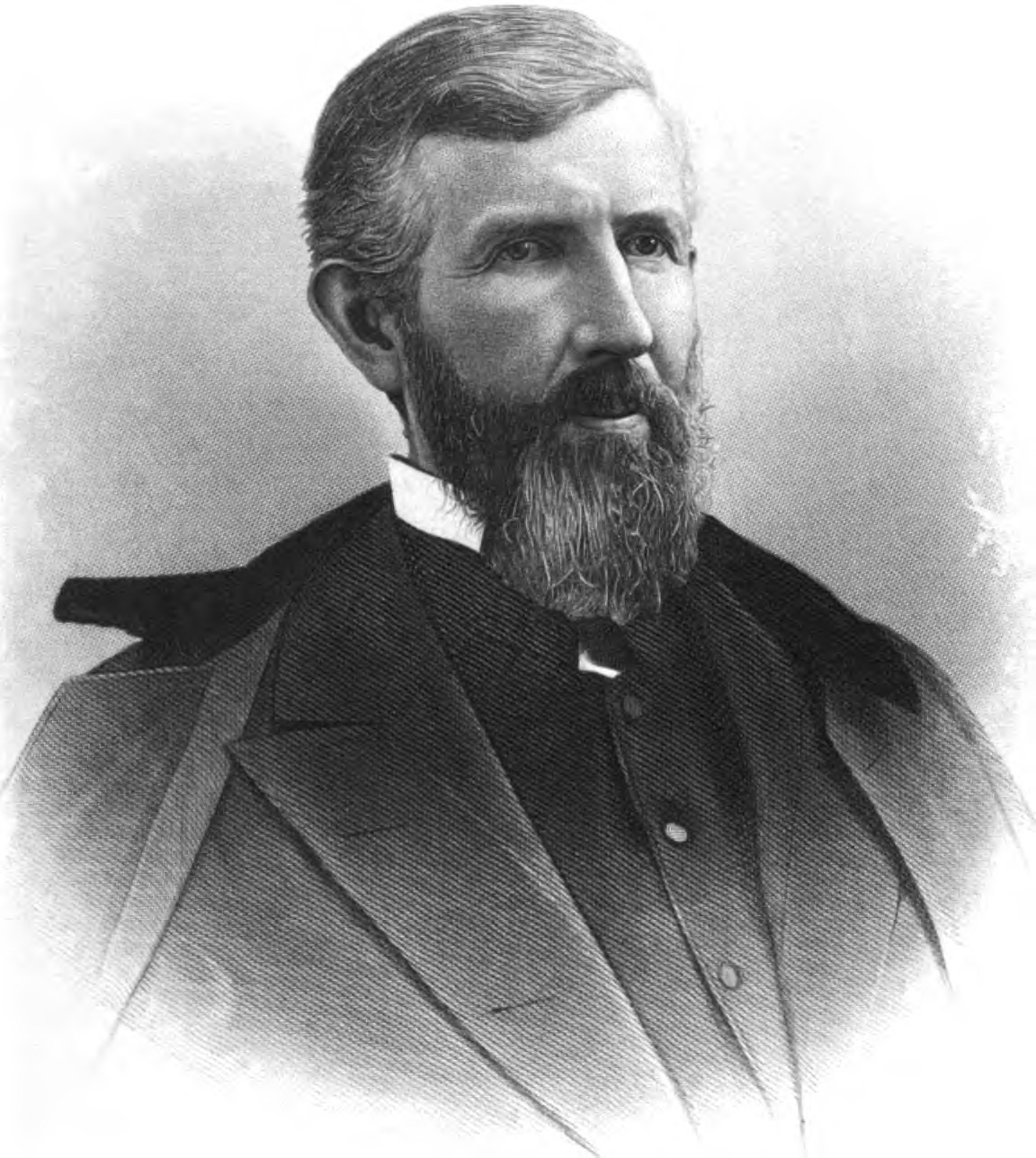

Nominee	William H. West	David M. Wilson
Party	Republican	Democratic
Popular vote	225,278	193,466
Percentage	53.80%	46.20%
Attorney General before election
Chauncey N. Olds
Republican
Elected Attorney General
William H. West
Republican

The 1865 Ohio Attorney General special election was held on October 10, 1865, to elect the Ohio Attorney General. Incumbent Republican William P. Richardson resigned less than a year into his term to return to military service. Republican Chauncey N. Olds was appointed to replace him and did not run for a full term. Republican Ohio state senator William H. West won the election, defeating Democratic lawyer David M. Wilson by a margin of seven percentage points.

== General election ==
=== Candidates ===
- William H. West, Ohio state senator (1864–1865) (Republican)
- David M. Wilson, lawyer (Democratic)

=== Results ===
1865 Ohio Attorney General special election results
Party	Candidate	Votes	%	±%
Republican	William H. West	225,278	53.80%	+2.64%
Democratic	David M. Wilson	193,466	46.20%	+2.64%
Total votes		418,744	100.00%	
Republican hold				
