= 1862 Ohio Attorney General election =

- October 14, 1862
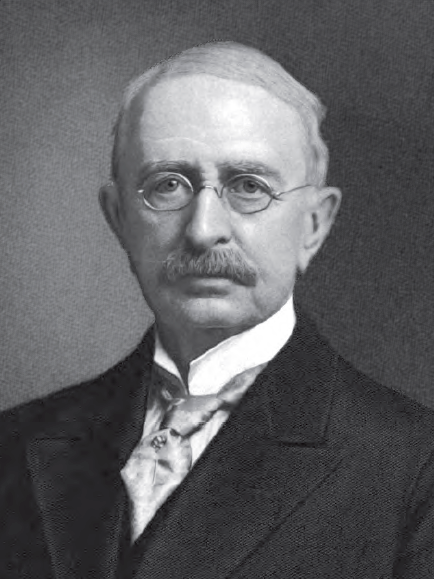

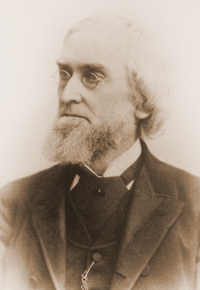
Nominee	Lyman R. Critchfield	Chauncey N. Olds
Party	Democratic	Republican
Popular vote	183,232	178,855
Percentage	50.60%	49.40%
Attorney General before election
James Murray
Republican
Elected Attorney General
Lyman R. Critchfield
Democratic

The 1862 Ohio Attorney General election was held on October 14, 1862, to elect the Ohio Attorney General. Republican incumbent James Murray did not seek re-election. Democratic candidate and Prosecuting Attorney of Holmes County Lyman R. Critchfield won the election, defeating Republican former Ohio state senator Chauncey N. Olds by one percentage point.

== General election ==
=== Candidates ===
- Lyman R. Critchfield, Prosecuting Attorney of Holmes County (1859–1862) (Democratic)
- Chauncey N. Olds, former Ohio State Senator (1849–1850) and former Ohio state representative (1848–1849) (Republican)

=== Results ===
1862 Ohio Attorney General election results
Party	Candidate	Votes	%	±%
Democratic	Lyman R. Critchfield	183,232	50.60%	+3.72%
Republican	Chauncey N. Olds	178,855	49.40%	−3.72%
Total votes		362,087	100.00%	
Democratic gain from Republican				
