= 1860 Ohio Attorney General election =

- October 9, 1860
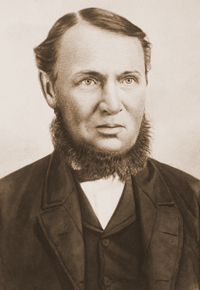

Nominee	James Murray	David W. Stambaugh
Party	Republican	Democratic
Popular vote	215,277	189,999
Percentage	53.12%	46.88%
Attorney General before election
Christopher Wolcott
Republican
Elected Attorney General
James Murray
Republican

The 1860 Ohio Attorney General election was held on October 9, 1860, to elect the Ohio Attorney General. Republican incumbent Christopher Wolcott did not run for re-election. Republican James Murray won the election, defeating Democratic candidate David W. Stambaugh by six percentage points.

== General election ==
=== Candidates ===
- James Murray, lawyer (Republican)
- David W. Stambaugh, lawyer (Democratic)

=== Results ===
1860 Ohio Attorney General election results
Party	Candidate	Votes	%	±%
Republican	James Murray	215,277	53.12%	+0.10%
Democratic	David W. Stambaugh	189,999	46.88%	−0.10%
Total votes		405,276	100.00%	
Republican hold				
