= 1856 Ohio Attorney General special election =

- October 14, 1856
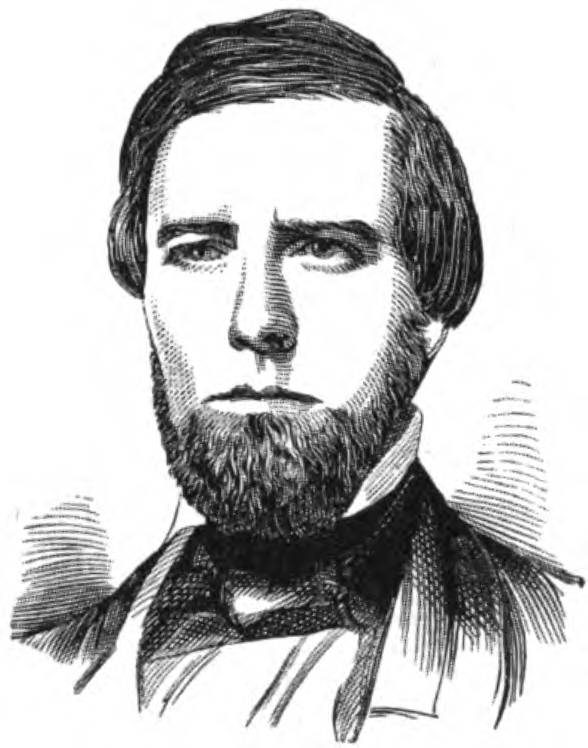

Nominee	Christopher Wolcott	Samuel M. Hart	John M. Buselfreed
Party	Republican	Democratic	Know Nothing
Popular vote	176,155	154,313	23,095
Percentage	49.82%	43.65%	6.53%
Attorney General before election
Christopher Wolcott
Republican
Elected Attorney General
Christopher Wolcott
Republican

The 1856 Ohio Attorney General special election was held on October 14, 1856, to elect the Ohio Attorney General. Republican incumbent Francis D. Kimball's death in August 1856 triggered a special election. Republican Christopher Wolcott, who was appointed Ohio Attorney General following Kimball's death, won election to a full term. Wolcott defeated Democratic candidate Samuel M. Hart by six percentage points. Know Nothing candidate John M. Buselfreed came in a distant third with six percent of the vote.

== General election ==
=== Candidates ===
- Christopher Wolcott, incumbent Ohio Attorney General (1856–1861) (Republican)
- Samuel M. Hart, lawyer and judge (Democratic)
- John M. Buselfreed, lawyer (Know Nothing)

=== Results ===
1856 Ohio Attorney General special election results
Party	Candidate	Votes	%	±%
Republican	Christopher Wolcott	176,155	49.82%	−6.27%
Democratic	Samuel M. Hart	154,313	43.65%	−0.26%
Know Nothing	John M. Buselfreed	23,095	6.53%	N/A
Total votes		353,563	100.00%	
Republican hold				
