= 1855 Ohio Attorney General election =

- October 9, 1855

Nominee	Francis D. Kimball	George Wythe McCook
Party	Republican	Democratic
Popular vote	168,868	132,216
Percentage	56.09%	43.91%
Attorney General before election
George Wythe McCook
Democratic
Elected Attorney General
Francis D. Kimball
Republican

The 1855 Ohio Attorney General election was held on October 9, 1855, to elect the Ohio Attorney General. Democratic incumbent George Wythe McCook ran for re-election but lost to Republican attorney Francis D. Kimball by thirteen percentage points.

== General election ==
=== Candidates ===
- George Wythe McCook, incumbent Ohio Attorney General (1854–1856) (Democratic)
- Francis D. Kimball, attorney (Republican)

=== Results ===
1855 Ohio Attorney General election results
Party	Candidate	Votes	%	±%
Republican	Francis D. Kimball	168,868	56.09%	N/A
Democratic	George Wythe McCook	132,216	43.91%	−9.11%
Total votes		301,084	100.00%	
Republican gain from Democratic				
