= 2022 Arkansas Commissioner of State Lands election =

- November 8, 2022
Candidate	Tommy Land	Darlene Goldi Gaines
Party	Republican	Democratic
Popular vote	611,723	277,750
Percentage	68.77%	31.23%
- Land: 50–60% 60–70% 70–80% 80–90% Gaines: 50–60%
Commissioner before election
Tommy Land
Republican
Elected Commissioner
Tommy Land
Republican

The 2022 Arkansas Commissioner of State Lands election was held on November 8, 2022, to elect the Arkansas Commissioner of State Lands. Incumbent Republican Land Commissioner Tommy Land was re-elected to a second term in office, defeating Democratic challenger Darlene Goldi Gaines in a landslide. Primary elections were held on May 24.

== Republican primary ==
=== Candidates ===
==== Nominee ====
- Tommy Land, incumbent land commissioner (2019–present)

== Democratic primary ==
=== Candidates ===
==== Nominee ====
- Darlene Goldi Gaines, business executive

== General election ==
=== Results ===
2022 Arkansas Commissioner of State Lands election
Party	Candidate	Votes	%	±%
Republican	Tommy Land (incumbent)	611,723	68.77	+8.72
Democratic	Darlene Goldi Gaines	277,750	31.23	−5.43
Total votes		889,473	100.00	N/A
Republican hold				

==== By county ====
County	Tommy Land Republican		Darlene Goldi Gaines Democratic		Margin		Total
County	#	%	#	%	#	%	Total
Arkansas	3,401	76.96%	1,018	23.04%	2,383	53.93%	4,419
Ashley	4,183	77.01%	1,249	22.99%	2,934	54.01%	5,432
Baxter	12,452	80.49%	3,018	19.51%	9,434	60.98%	15,470
Benton	61,210	68.63%	27,972	31.37%	33,238	37.27%	89,182
Boone	10,555	83.68%	2,059	16.32%	8,496	67.35%	12,614
Bradley	1,803	71.18%	730	28.82%	1,073	42.36%	2,533
Calhoun	1,265	80.52%	306	19.48%	959	61.04%	1,571
Carroll	6,052	67.57%	2,905	32.43%	3,147	35.13%	8,957
Chicot	1,669	49.23%	1,721	50.77%	-52	-1.53%	3,390
Clark	3,669	61.89%	2,259	38.11%	1,410	23.79%	5,928
Clay	3,205	82.31%	689	17.69%	2,516	64.61%	3,894
Cleburne	8,628	86.77%	1,316	13.23%	7,312	73.53%	9,944
Cleveland	2,302	86.35%	364	13.65%	1,938	72.69%	2,666
Columbia	4,293	71.38%	1,721	28.62%	2,572	42.77%	6,014
Conway	4,689	71.51%	1,868	28.49%	2,821	43.02%	6,557
Craighead	19,542	71.60%	7,752	28.40%	11,790	43.20%	27,294
Crawford	14,151	81.51%	3,209	18.49%	10,942	63.03%	17,360
Crittenden	5,552	52.22%	5,079	47.78%	473	4.45%	10,631
Cross	3,800	77.60%	1,097	22.40%	2,703	55.20%	4,897
Dallas	1,405	69.35%	621	30.65%	784	38.70%	2,026
Desha	1,702	57.33%	1,267	42.67%	435	14.65%	2,969
Drew	3,523	67.75%	1,677	32.25%	1,846	35.50%	5,200
Faulkner	27,691	69.83%	11,962	30.17%	15,729	39.67%	39,653
Franklin	4,278	81.24%	988	18.76%	3,290	62.48%	5,266
Fulton	3,196	81.78%	712	18.22%	2,484	63.56%	3,908
Garland	23,517	72.21%	9,052	27.79%	14,465	44.41%	32,569
Grant	5,376	86.18%	862	13.82%	4,514	72.36%	6,238
Greene	9,375	82.01%	2,056	17.99%	7,319	64.03%	11,431
Hempstead	3,401	74.88%	1,141	25.12%	2,260	49.76%	4,542
Hot Spring	7,466	77.42%	2,178	22.58%	5,288	54.83%	9,644
Howard	2,696	74.95%	901	25.05%	1,795	49.90%	3,597
Independence	8,485	81.79%	1,889	18.21%	6,596	63.58%	10,374
Izard	3,792	83.45%	752	16.55%	3,040	66.90%	4,544
Jackson	2,934	73.48%	1,059	26.52%	1,875	46.96%	3,993
Jefferson	7,560	45.20%	9,166	54.80%	-1,606	-9.60%	16,726
Johnson	5,352	77.44%	1,559	22.56%	3,793	54.88%	6,911
Lafayette	1,323	68.48%	609	31.52%	714	36.96%	1,932
Lawrence	3,813	83.86%	734	16.14%	3,079	67.71%	4,547
Lee	980	50.91%	945	49.09%	35	1.82%	1,925
Lincoln	2,081	76.59%	636	23.41%	1,445	53.18%	2,717
Little River	2,913	77.87%	828	22.13%	2,085	55.73%	3,741
Logan	5,058	81.57%	1,143	18.43%	3,915	63.13%	6,201
Lonoke	17,686	79.80%	4,476	20.20%	13,210	59.61%	22,162
Madison	4,512	79.56%	1,159	20.44%	3,353	59.13%	5,671
Marion	4,835	81.80%	1,076	18.20%	3,759	63.59%	5,911
Miller	8,753	78.17%	2,444	21.83%	6,309	56.35%	11,197
Mississippi	5,373	64.38%	2,973	35.62%	2,400	28.76%	8,346
Monroe	1,281	60.71%	829	39.29%	452	21.42%	2,110
Montgomery	2,606	83.39%	519	16.61%	2,087	66.78%	3,125
Nevada	1,718	70.47%	720	29.53%	998	40.94%	2,438
Newton	2,495	82.29%	537	17.71%	1,958	64.58%	3,032
Ouachita	4,320	62.27%	2,618	37.73%	1,702	24.53%	6,938
Perry	3,002	80.83%	712	19.17%	2,290	61.66%	3,714
Phillips	1,914	46.54%	2,199	53.46%	-285	-6.93%	4,113
Pike	3,170	86.35%	501	13.65%	2,669	72.70%	3,671
Poinsett	4,471	81.29%	1,029	18.71%	3,442	62.58%	5,500
Polk	5,840	85.53%	988	14.47%	4,852	71.06%	6,828
Pope	13,727	79.18%	3,609	20.82%	10,118	58.36%	17,336
Prairie	2,202	84.40%	407	15.60%	1,795	68.80%	2,609
Pulaski	56,049	46.13%	65,454	53.87%	-9,405	-7.74%	121,503
Randolph	4,374	83.20%	883	16.80%	3,491	66.41%	5,257
Saline	32,118	75.73%	10,291	24.27%	21,827	51.47%	42,409
Scott	2,507	87.11%	371	12.89%	2,136	74.22%	2,878
Searcy	2,586	85.66%	433	14.34%	2,153	71.32%	3,019
Sebastian	24,306	72.37%	9,282	27.63%	15,024	44.73%	33,588
Sevier	2,934	83.07%	598	16.93%	2,336	66.14%	3,532
Sharp	5,030	83.96%	961	16.04%	4,069	67.92%	5,991
St. Francis	2,602	52.06%	2,396	47.94%	206	4.12%	4,998
Stone	4,038	80.81%	959	19.19%	3,079	61.62%	4,997
Union	8,202	71.33%	3,297	28.67%	4,905	42.66%	11,499
Van Buren	5,052	82.32%	1,085	17.68%	3,967	64.64%	6,137
Washington	38,895	56.00%	30,558	44.00%	8,337	12.00%	69,453
White	19,068	83.47%	3,776	16.53%	15,292	66.94%	22,844
Woodruff	1,391	67.95%	656	32.05%	735	35.91%	2,047
Yell	4,328	83.02%	885	16.98%	3,443	66.05%	5,213
Totals	611,723	68.77%	277,750	31.23%	333,973	37.55%	889,473

Counties that flipped from Democratic to Republican

- Crittenden (largest city: West Memphis)
- Desha (largest city: Dumas)
- Lee (largest city: Marianna)
- Monroe (largest city: Brinkley)
- St. Francis (largest city: Forrest City)
- Woodruff (largest city: Augusta)

==== By congressional district ====
Land won all four congressional districts.

District	Land	Goldi Gaines	Representative
1st	74%	26%	Rick Crawford
2nd	63%	37%	French Hill
3rd	66%	34%	Steve Womack
4th	73%	27%	Bruce Westerman

== See also ==
- 2022 Arkansas elections
