= 1873 Ohio gubernatorial election =

- October 8, 1873
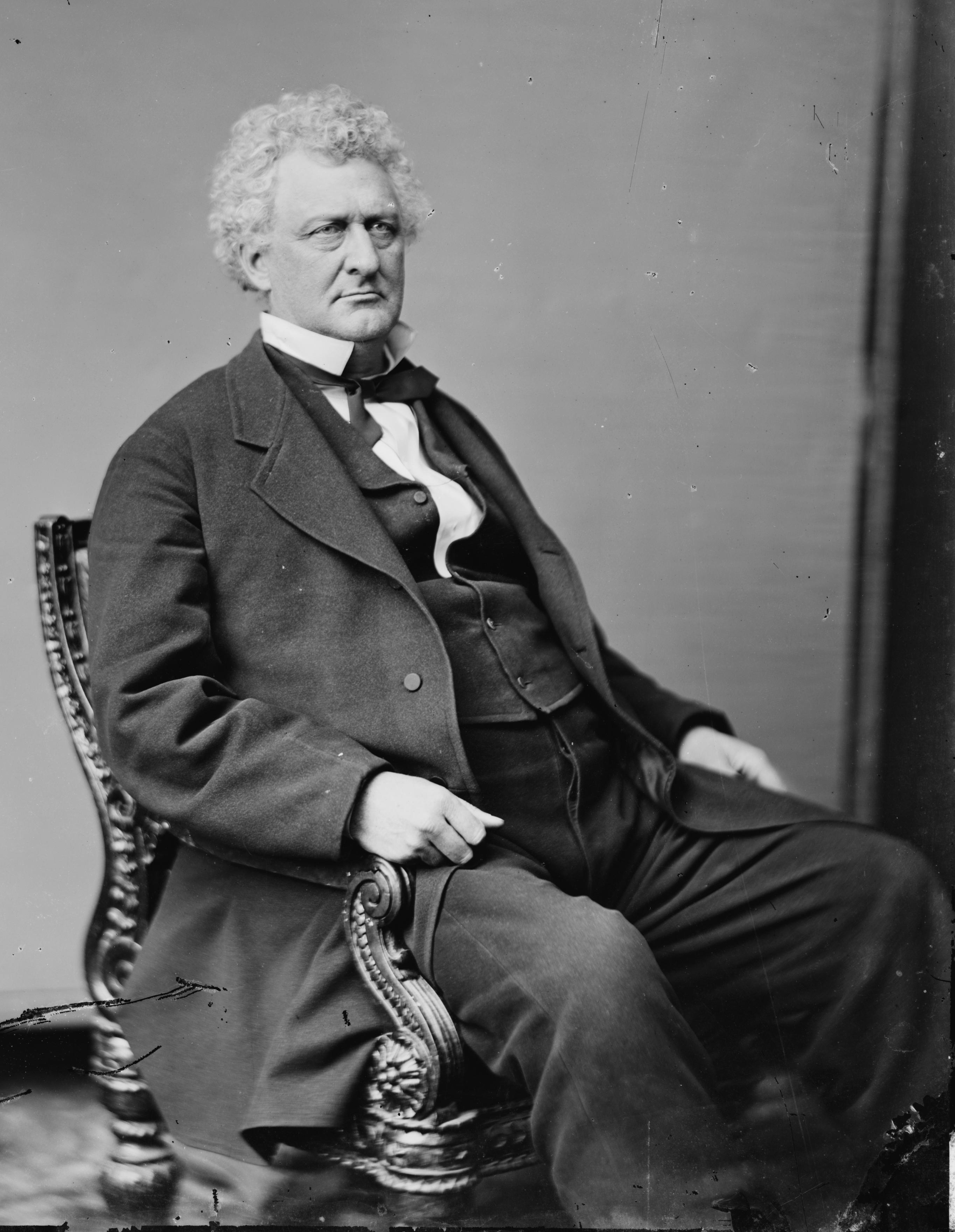

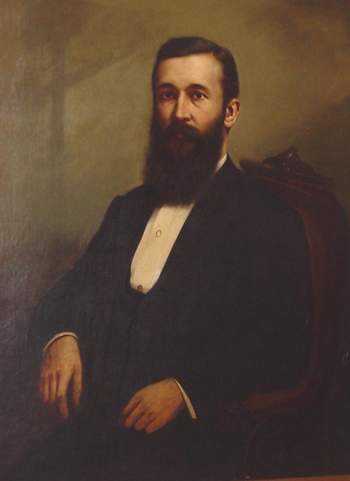
Nominee	William Allen	Edward Follansbee Noyes
Party	Democratic	Republican
Popular vote	214,654	213,837
Percentage	47.82%	47.64%
- County results Allen: 40–50% 50–60% 60–70% 70–80% Noyes: 40–50% 50–60% 60–70% 70–80%
Governor before election
Edward Follansbee Noyes
Republican
Elected Governor
William Allen
Democratic

The 1873 Ohio gubernatorial election was held on October 8, 1873. Democratic nominee William Allen defeated incumbent Republican Edward Follansbee Noyes with 47.82% of the vote.

== General election ==
=== Candidates ===
Major party candidates

- William Allen, Democratic
- Edward Follansbee Noyes, Republican

Other candidates

- Gideon T. Stewart, Prohibition
- Isaac C. Collins, Independent

=== Results ===
1873 Ohio gubernatorial election
Party	Candidate	Votes	%	±%
Democratic	William Allen	214,654	47.82%	
Republican	Edward Follansbee Noyes (incumbent)	213,837	47.64%	
Prohibition	Gideon T. Stewart	10,278	2.29%	
Independent	Isaac C. Collins	10,109	2.25%	
Majority		817		
Turnout				
Democratic gain from Republican		Swing		
