= 1858 Ohio Attorney General election =

- October 12, 1858
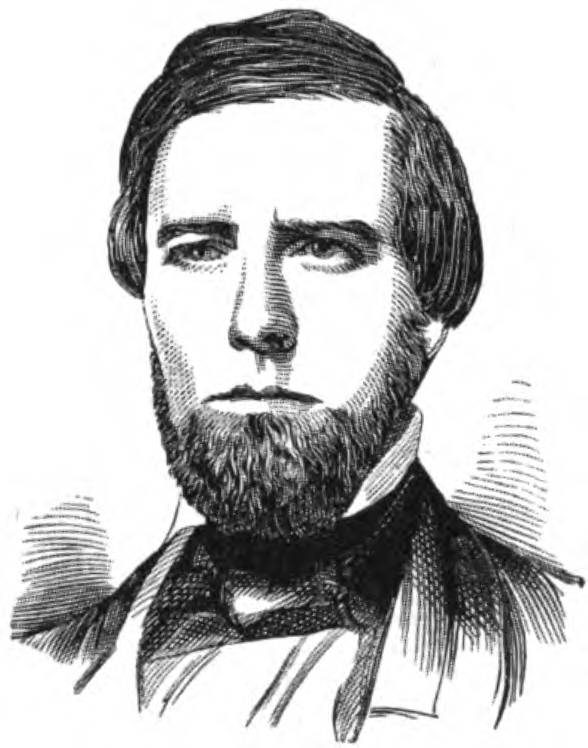

| Nominee | Christopher Wolcott | Durbin Ward |
| Party | Republican | Democratic |
| Popular vote | 182,985 | 162,136 |
| Percentage | 53.02% | 46.98% |
Attorney General before election
Christopher Wolcott
Republican
Elected Attorney General
Christopher Wolcott
Republican

The 1858 Ohio Attorney General election was held on October 12, 1858, to elect the Ohio Attorney General. Republican incumbent Christopher Wolcott won re-election to a second term, defeating Democratic candidate Durbin Ward by six percentage points.

== General election ==
=== Candidates ===
- Christopher Wolcott, incumbent Ohio Attorney General (1856–1861) (Republican)
- Durbin Ward, lawyer (Democratic)

=== Results ===
1858 Ohio Attorney General election results
| Party | Candidate | Votes | % | ±% |
|---|---|---|---|---|
| Republican | Christopher Wolcott | 182,985 | 53.02% | +3.20% |
| Democratic | Durbin Ward | 162,136 | 46.98% | +3.33% |
| Total votes | | 345,121 | 100.00% | |
| Republican hold | | | | |
