= 1872 Republican National Convention =

American political convention

- 1872 presidential election
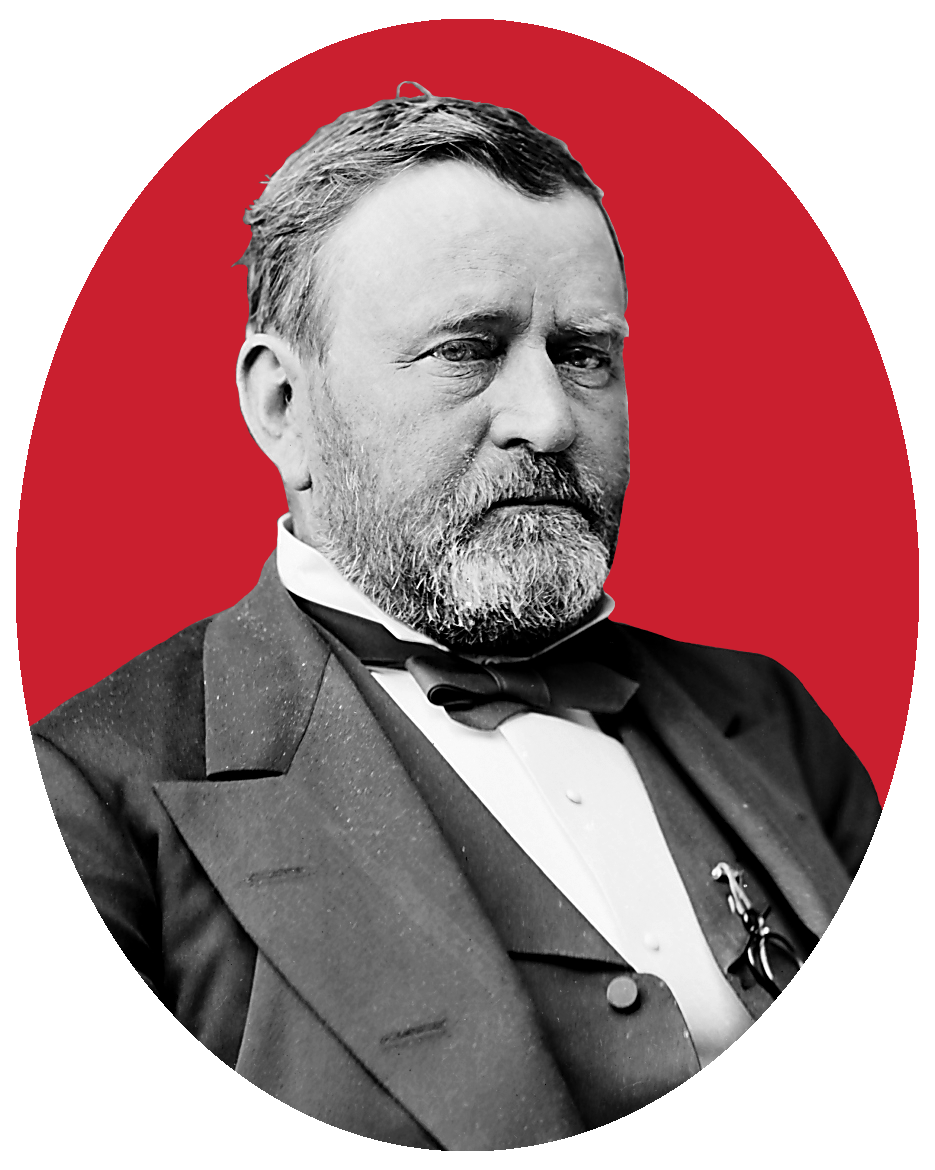
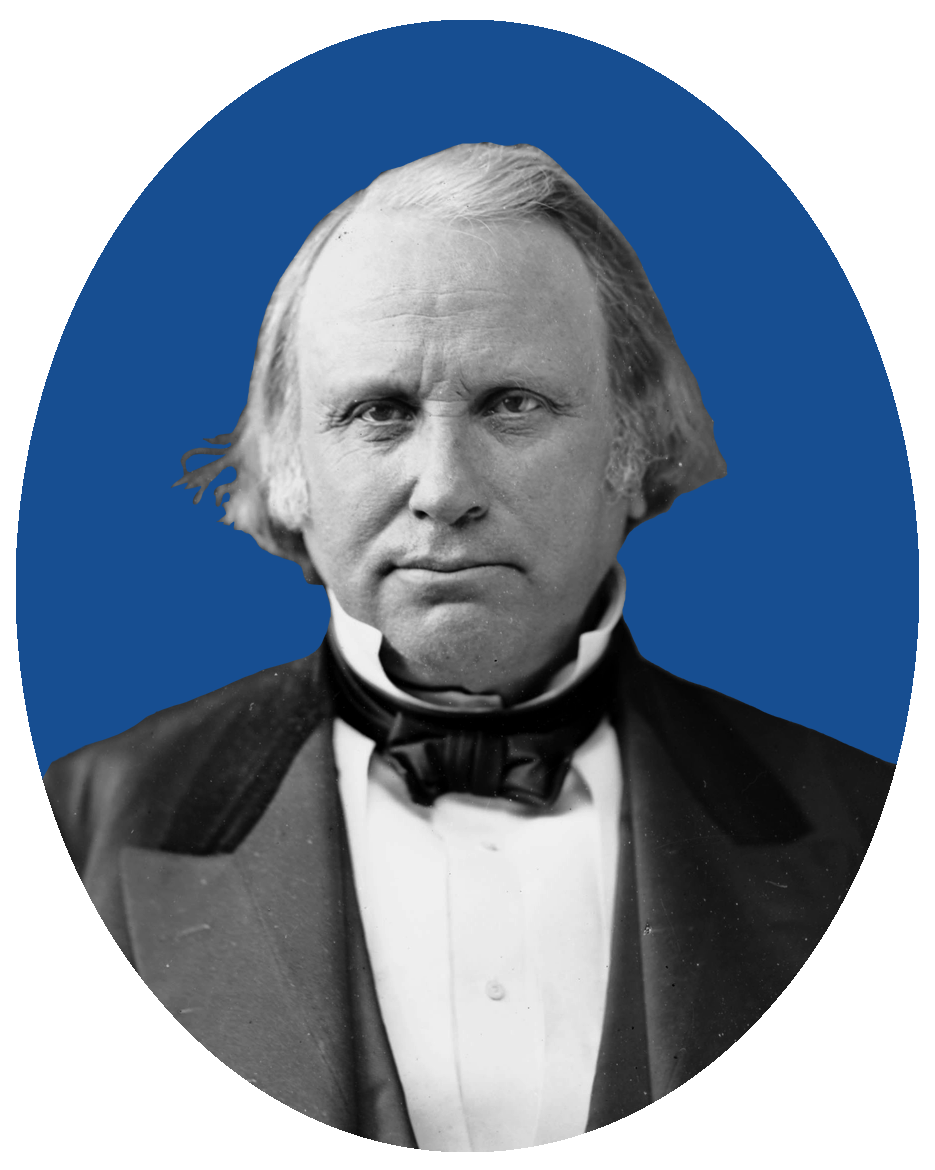
- Nominees; Grant and Wilson

Convention
- Dates: June 5–6, 1872
- City: Philadelphia, Pennsylvania, U.S.
- Venue: Academy of Music

Candidates
- Presidential nominee: Ulysses S. Grant of Illinois
- Vice-presidential nominee: Henry Wilson of Massachusetts

The 1872 Republican National Convention was held in Philadelphia, Pennsylvania, June 5–6, 1872. President Ulysses S. Grant was unanimously nominated for reelection by the convention's 752 delegates. Massachusetts Senator Henry Wilson from Massachusetts replaced Vice President Schuyler Colfax as the Republican vice presidential nominee.

== Presidential nomination ==
=== Presidential candidate ===
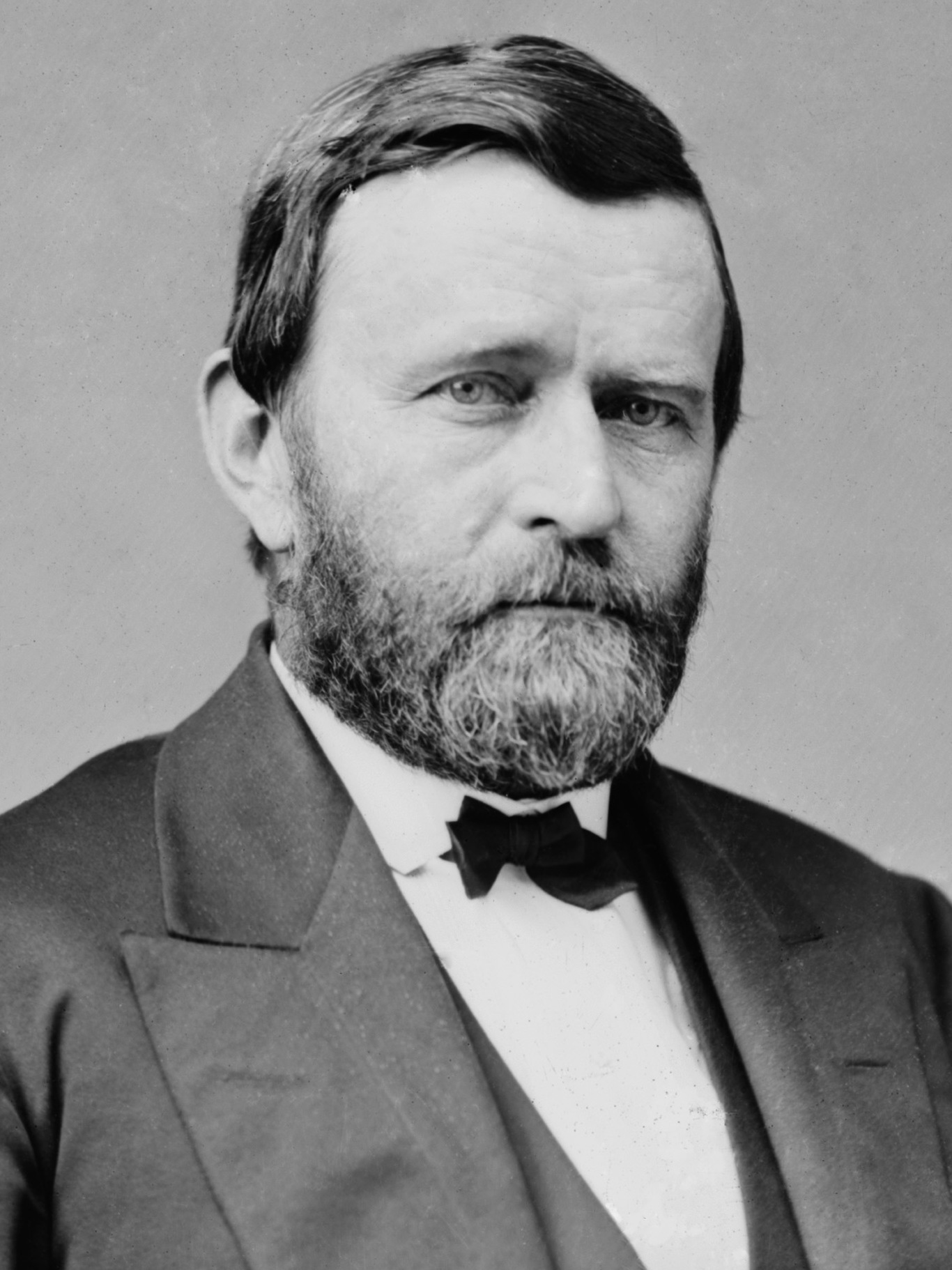
President
Ulysses S. Grant
of Illinois

Vice President Colfax was considered a potential rival to Grant for the presidential nomination. Although Colfax declared himself open to the prospect should Grant decide not to run for a second term, his stance alienated him from both the President and his many supporters.

Grant's nomination was co-seconded by William Henry Grey of Arkansas, the first African-American to address a major U.S. political party national convention. Grant received the nomination unanimously on the first ballot. Grant's re-nomination would be the last time the Republican party nominated a candidate unanimously until McKinley's re-nomination in 1900.

Presidential Ballot
Ballot	1st
Grant	752

Presidential Balloting / 2nd Day of Convention (June 6, 1872)

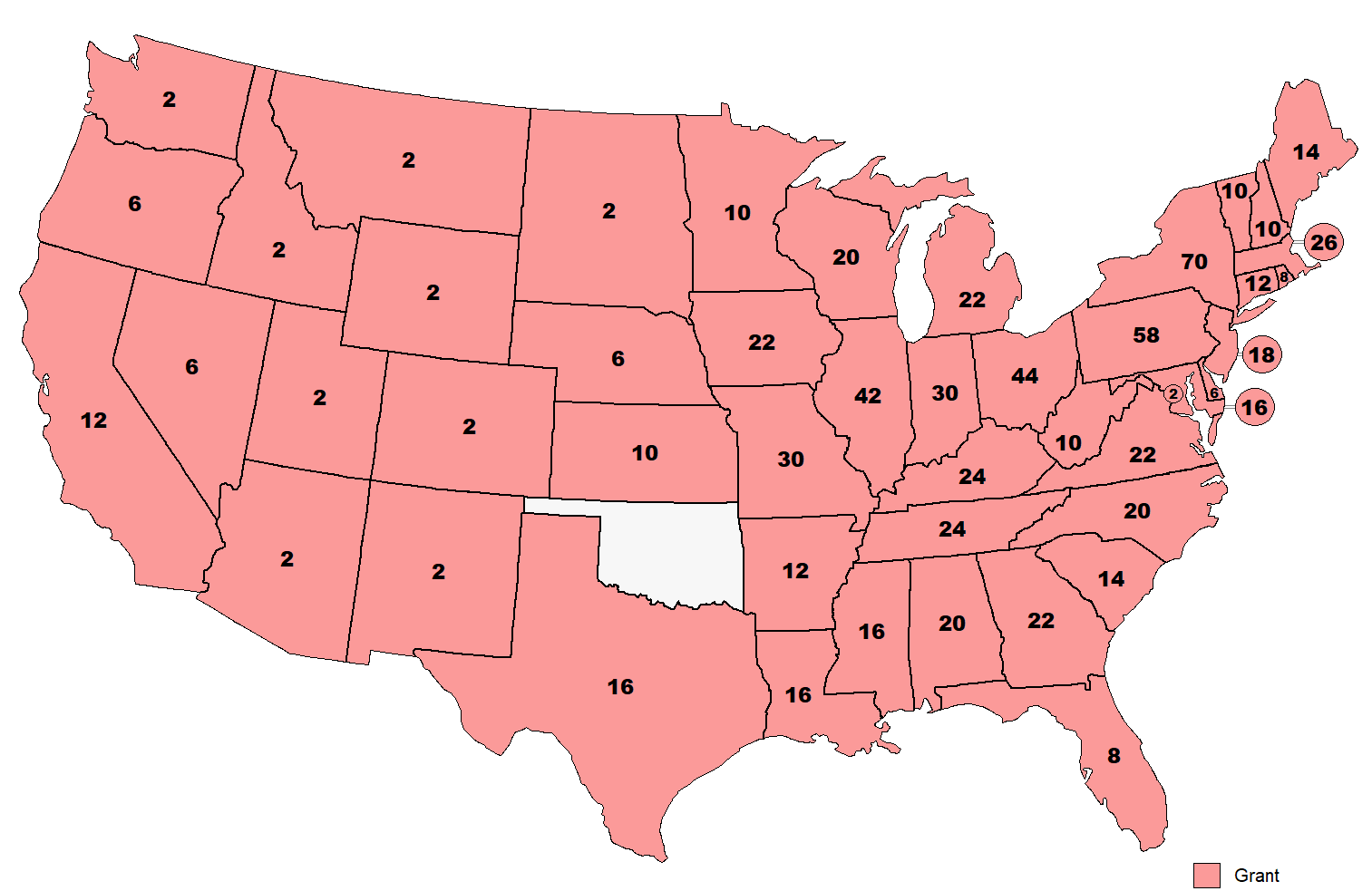
1st
Presidential Ballot

== The platform ==
The platform, significantly so in the first section, boasted of the party's achievements since it had attained power in 1861:

The Republican party of the United States, assembled in National Convention in the city of Philadelphia, on the 5th and 6th days of June, 1872, again declares its faith, appeals to its history, and announces its position upon the questions before the country:

First: During eleven years of supremacy it has accepted with grand courage the solemn duties of the time. It suppressed a gigantic rebellion, emancipated four millions of slaves, decreed the equal citizenship of all, and established universal suffrage. Exhibiting unparalleled magnanimity, it criminally punished no man for political offenses, and warmly welcomed all who proved loyalty by obeying the laws and dealing justly with their neighbors. It has steadily decreased with firm hand the resultant disorders of a great war, and initiated a wise and humane policy toward the Indians. The Pacific railroad and similar vast enterprises have been generously aided and successfully conducted, the public lands freely given to actual settlers, immigration protected and encouraged, and a full acknowledgment of the naturalized citizens' rights secured from European Powers. A uniform national currency has been provided, repudiation frowned down, the national credit sustained under the most extraordinary burdens, and new bonds negotiated at lower rates. The revenues have been carefully collected and honestly applied. Despite large annual reductions of the rates of taxation, the public debt has been reduced during General Grant's Presidency at the rate of a hundred millions a year, great financial crises have been avoided, and peace and plenty prevail throughout the land. Menacing foreign difficulties have been peacefully and honorably composed, and the honor and power of the nation kept in high respect throughout the world. This glorious record of the past is the party's best pledge for the future. We believe the people will not in trust the Government to any party or combination of men composed chiefly of those who have resisted every step of this beneficent progress.

Second: The recent amendments to the national constitution should be cordially sustained because they are right, -not merely tolerated because they are laws, -and should be carried out according to their spirit by appropriate legislation, the enforcement of which can safely be entrusted only to the party that secured those amendments.

Third: Complete liberty and exact equality in the enjoyment of all civil, political, and public rights should be established and effectually maintained throughout the Union by efficient and appropriate state and federal legislation. Neither the law nor its administration should admit any discrimination in respect of citizens by reason of race, creed, color, or previous condition of servitude.

Fourth: The national government should seek to maintain honorable peace with all nations, protecting its citizens everywhere, and sympathizing with all peoples who strive for greater liberty.

Fifth: Any system of the civil service, under which the subordinate positions of the government are considered rewards for mere party zeal, is fatally demoralizing, and we therefore for a reform of the system by laws which shall abolish the evils of patronage, and make honesty, efficiency, and fidelity the essential qualifications for public positions, without practically creating a life-tenure of office.

Sixth: We are opposed to further grants of public lands to corporations and monopolies, and demand that the national domain be set apart for free homes and people.

Seventh: The annual revenue, after paying current expenditures, pensions, and the interest on the public debt, should furnish a moderate balance for the reduction of the principal, and that revenue, except so much as may be derived from a tax upon tobacco and liquors, should be raised by duties upon importations, the details of which should be so adjusted as to aid in securing remunerative wages to labor, and to promote the industries, prosperity, and growth of the whole country.

Eight: We hold in undying honor the soldiers and sailors whose valor saved the Union. Their pensions are a sacred debt of the nation, and the widows and orphans of those who died for their country are entitled to the care of a generous and grateful people. We favor such additional legislation as will extend the bounty of the government to all our soldiers and sailors who were honorably discharged, and who, in the line of duty, became disabled, without regard to the length of service or the cause of such discharge.

Nine: The doctrine of Great Britain and other European powers concerning allegiance- "once a subject always a subject" -having at last, through the efforts of the Republican party, been abandoned, and the American idea of the individual's right to transfer allegiance having been accepted by European nations, it is the duty of our government to guard with jealous care the rights of adopted citizens against the assumption of unauthorized claims by their former governments, and we urge continued careful encouragement and protection of voluntary immigration.

Tenth: The franking privilege ought to be abolished, and the way prepared for a speedy reduction in the rates of postage.

Eleventh: Among the questions which press for attention is that which concerns the relations of capital and labor, and the Republican party recognizes the duty of so shaping legislation as to secure full protection and amplest field for capital, -and for labor, the creator of capital, the largest opportunities and a just share of the mutual profits of these two great servants of civilization.

Twelfth: We hold that congress and the President have only fulfilled an imperative duty in their measures for the suppression of violent and treasonable organizations in certain lately rebellious regions, and for the protection of the ballot-box, and therefore they are entitled to the thanks of the nation.

Thirteenth: We denounce repudiation of the public debt, in any form or disguise, as a national crime. We witness with pride the reduction of the principal of the debt, and of the rates of interest upon the balance, and confidently expect that our excellent national currency will be perfected by a speedy resumption of specie payment.

Fourteenth: The Republican party is mindful of its obligations to the loyal women of America for their noble devotion to the cause of freedom. Their admission to wider fields of usefulness is viewed with satisfaction, and the honest demand of any class of citizens for additional rights should be treated with respectful consideration.

Fifteenth: We heartily approve the action of congress in extending amnesty to those lately in rebellion, and rejoice in the growth of peace and fraternal feeling throughout the land.

Sixteenth: The Republican party proposes to respect the rights reserved by the people to themselves, as carefully as the powers delegated by them to the state and to the federal government. It disapproves of the resort to unconstitutional laws for the purpose of removing evil, by interference with rights not surrendered by the people to either the state or national government.

Seventeenth: It is the duty of the general government to adopt such measures as may tend to encourage and restore American commerce and shipbuilding.

Eighteenth: We believe that the modest patriotism, the earnest purpose, the sound judgement, the practical wisdom, the incorruptible integrity, and the illustrious services of Ulysses S. Grant have commended him to the heart of the American people, and with him at our head we start to-day upon a new march to victory.

Nineteenth: Henry Wilson, nominated for the Vice-Presidency, known to the whole land from the early days of the great struggle for liberty as an indefatigable laborer in all campaigns, an incorruptible legislator, and a representative man of American institutions, is worthy to associate with our great leader, and share the honors which we pledge our best efforts to bestow upon them.

=== Anti-Temperance and the Raster Resolution ===
The late 19th century saw a massive and nationwide growth of the temperance movement, and until 1872 the Republican Party had not formally adopted a stance on the prohibition of alcohol. Famous German American editor and political figure Hermann Raster of Chicago wrote a passionate and carefully worded resolution, dubbed the Raster Resolution, for the 1872 convention. The resolution attacked the temperance movement and solidified the Republican Party's opposition to prohibition, and it was inserted in condensed form as the sixteenth section of the official platform.

== Vice Presidential nomination ==
=== Vice Presidential candidates ===
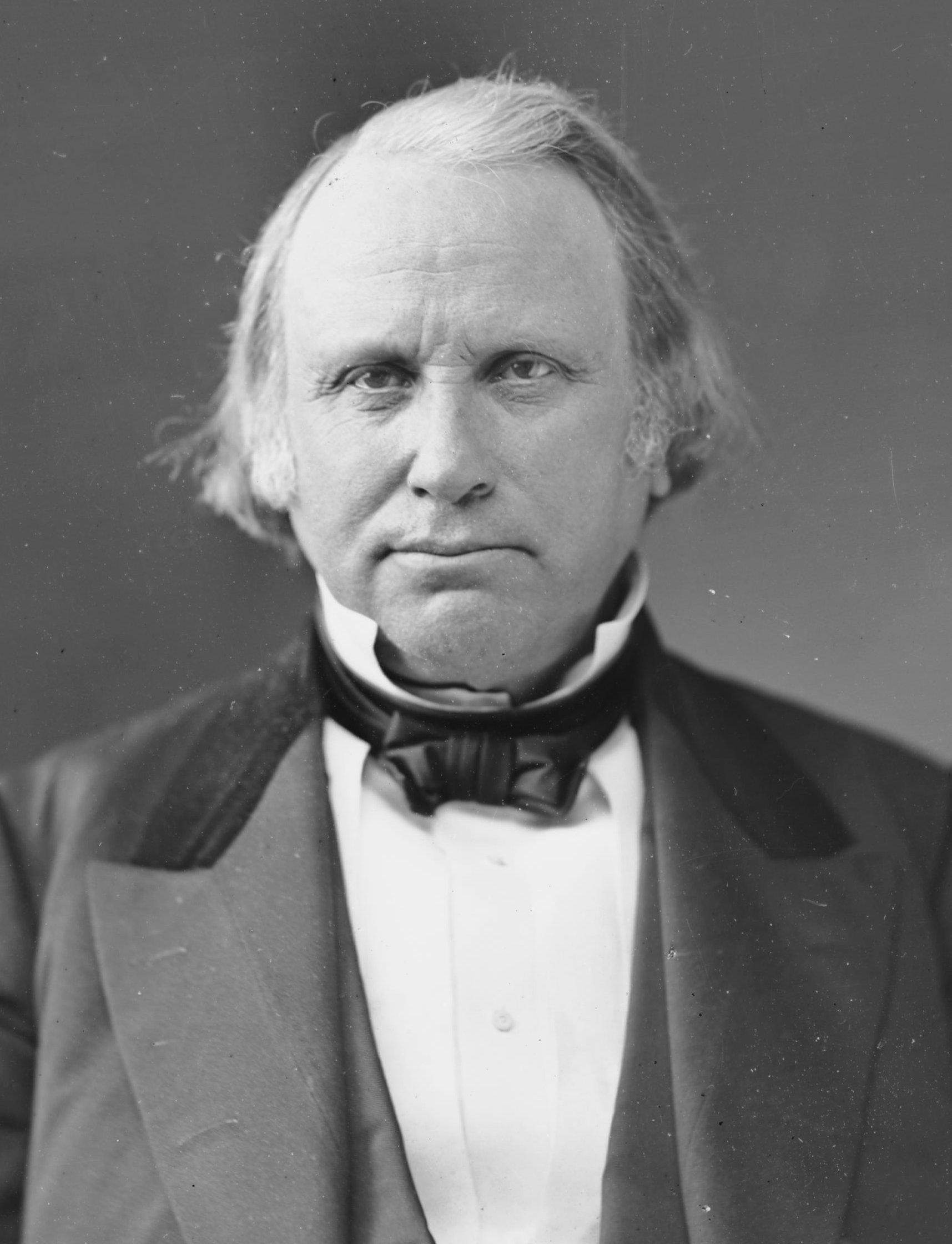
Senator
Henry Wilson
of Massachusetts

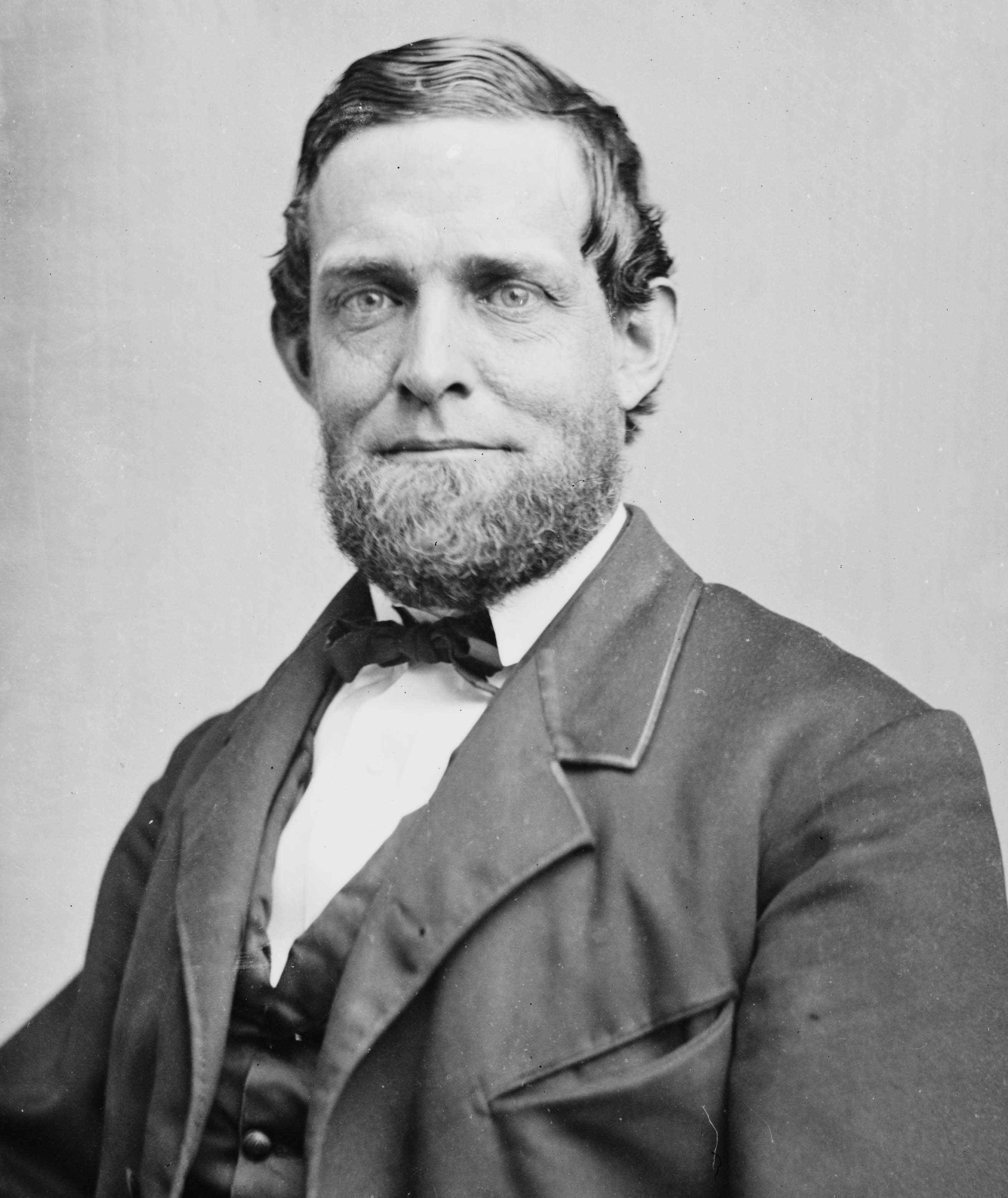
Vice President
Schuyler Colfax
of Indiana

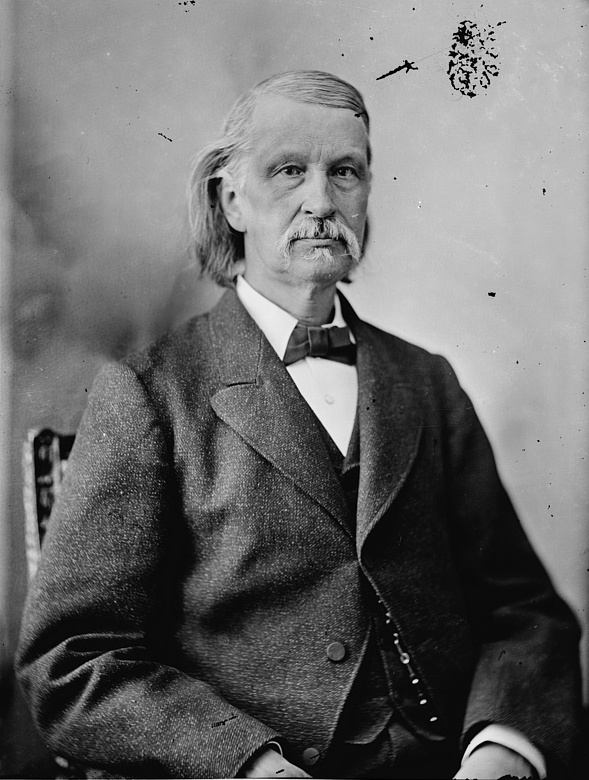
Representative
Horace Maynard
of Tennessee

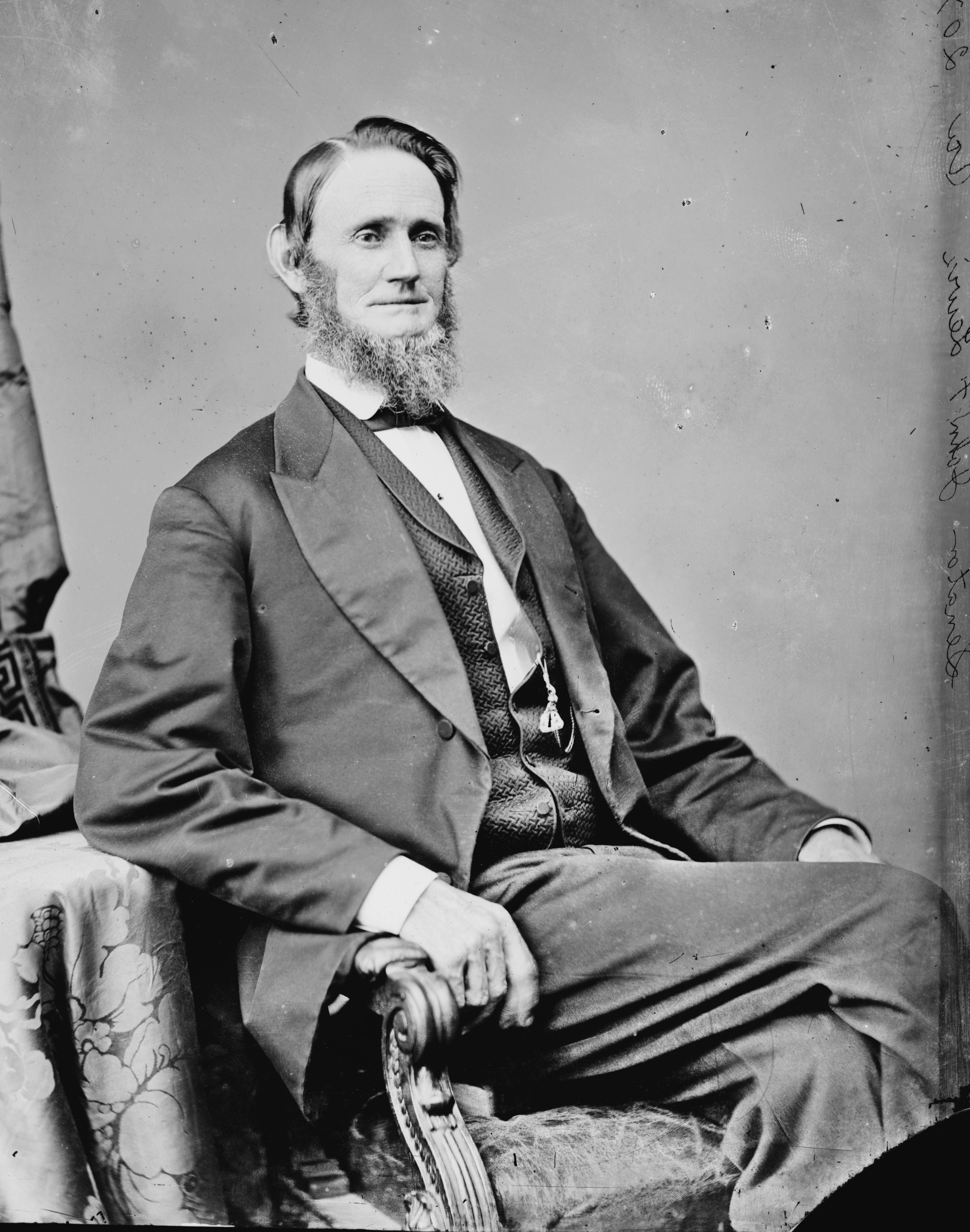
Senator
John F. Lewis
of Virginia

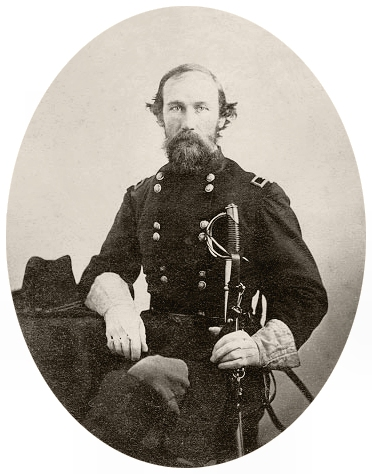
Governor
Edmund J. Davis
of Texas

=== Not Nominated ===
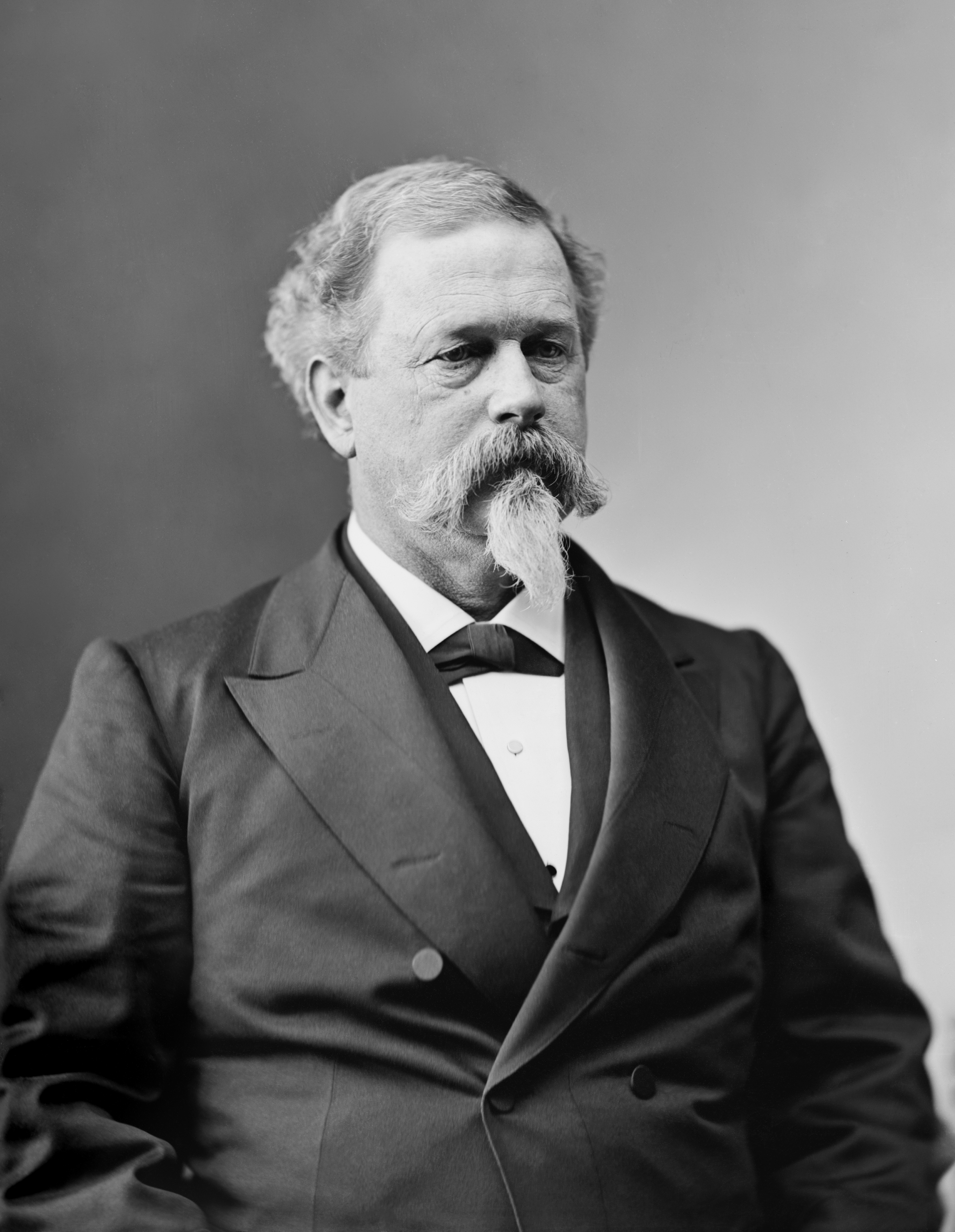
Former Governor
Joseph R. Hawley
of Connecticut

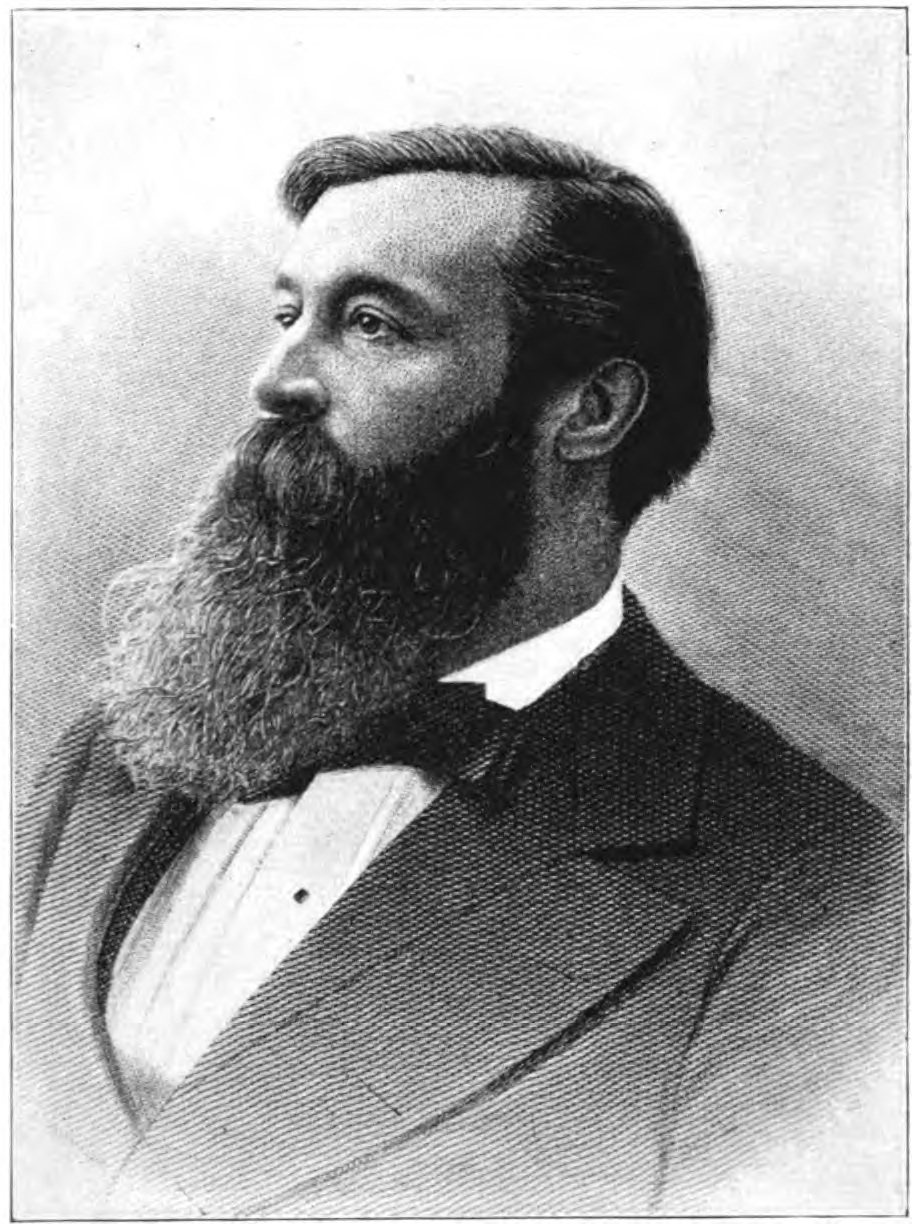
Governor
Edward F. Noyes
of Ohio

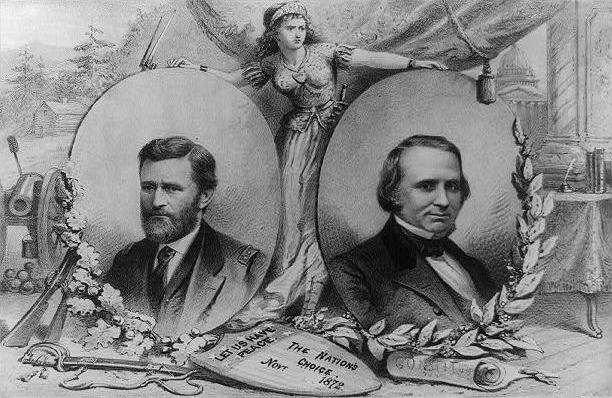
Grant/Wilson campaign poster

Colfax's chances for re-nomination were further damaged when a small movement within the Liberal Republican Party sought to enter his name for their presidential nomination. While the rumors of Colfax's nomination for either party's nomination amounted to little more than speculation, it likely cost him his bid for re-nomination. Colfax narrowly missed the mark by garnering 308.5 delegates compared to Massachusetts Senator Henry Wilson's 399.5 on a revised first ballot. President Grant was among many notables who remained on the sideline during the vice presidential balloting.

Vice Presidential Ballot
	1st (Before Shifts)	1st (After Shifts)
Wilson	364.5	399.5
Colfax	321.5	308.5
Maynard	26	26
Lewis	22	0
Davis	16	16
Hawley	1	1
Noyes	1	1

Vice Presidential Balloting / 2nd Day of Convention (June 6, 1872)

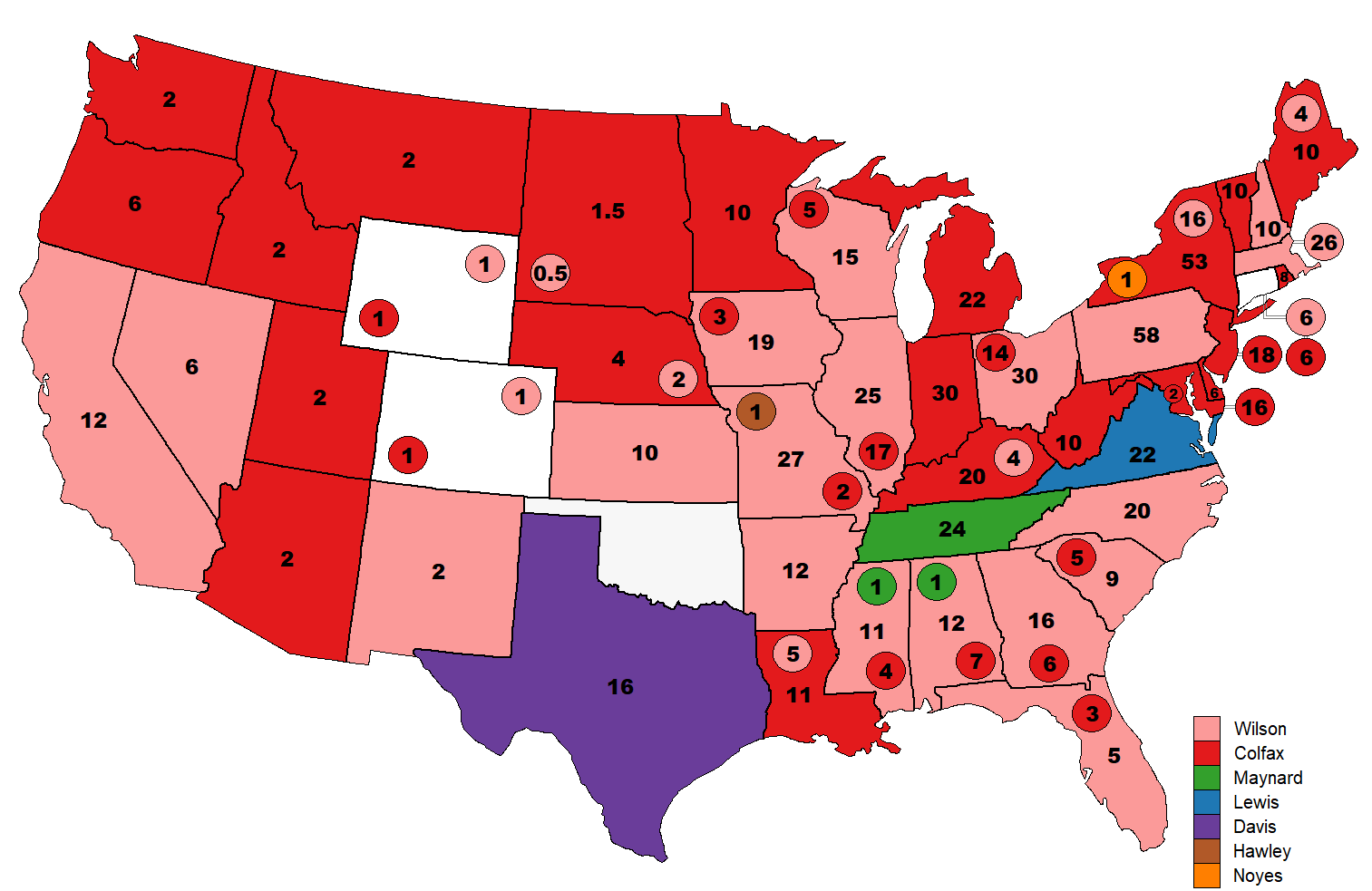
1st
Vice Presidential Ballot
(Before Shifts)

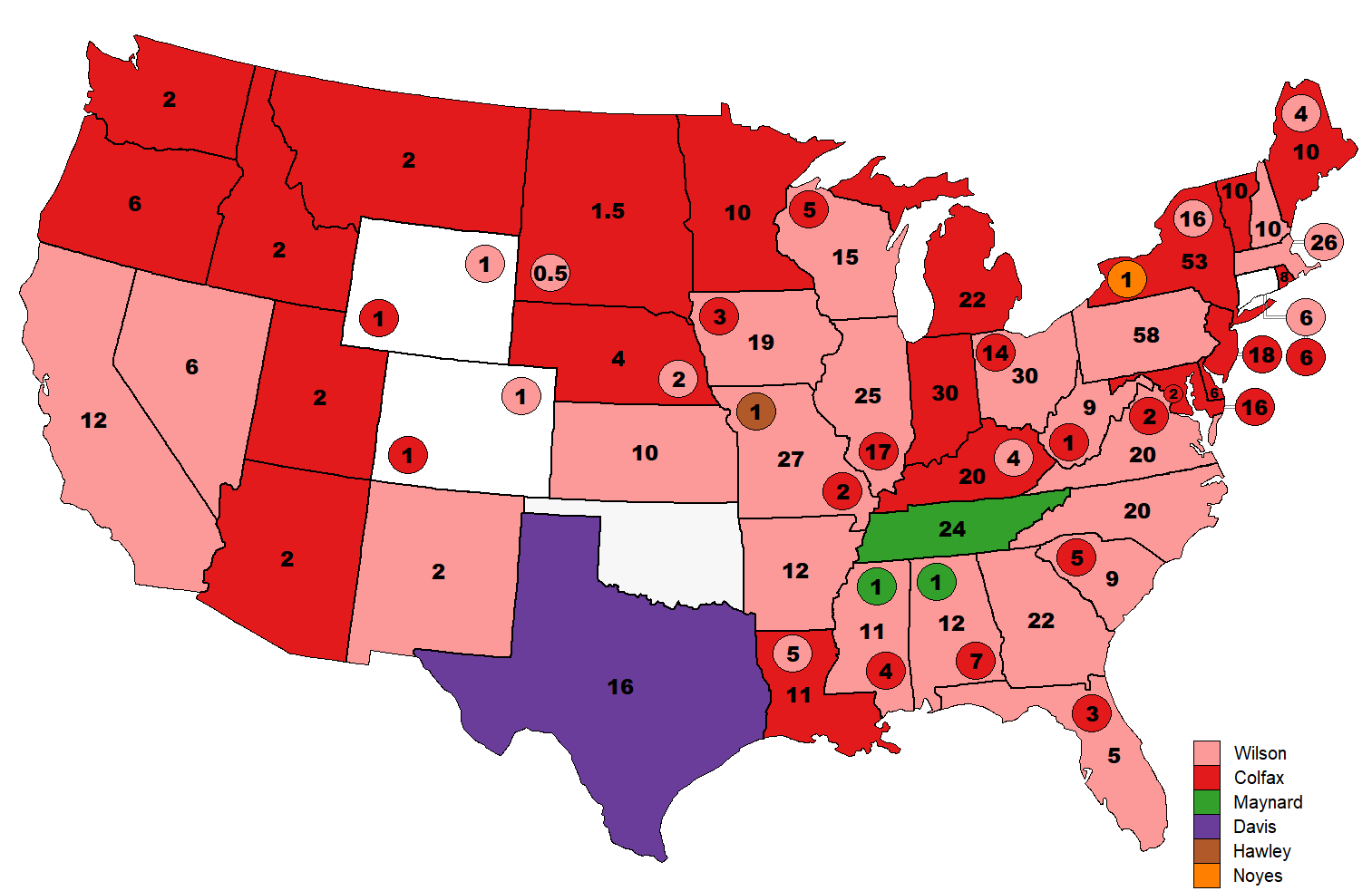
1st
Vice Presidential Ballot
(After Shifts)

== See also ==
- History of the United States Republican Party
- United States presidential nominating convention
- List of Republican National Conventions
- 1872 United States presidential election
- 1872 Democratic National Convention
- Temperance movement
- Hermann Raster

Preceded by 1868; Chicago	Republican National Conventions	Succeeded by 1876; Cincinnati
