= George Wythe McCook =

American politician

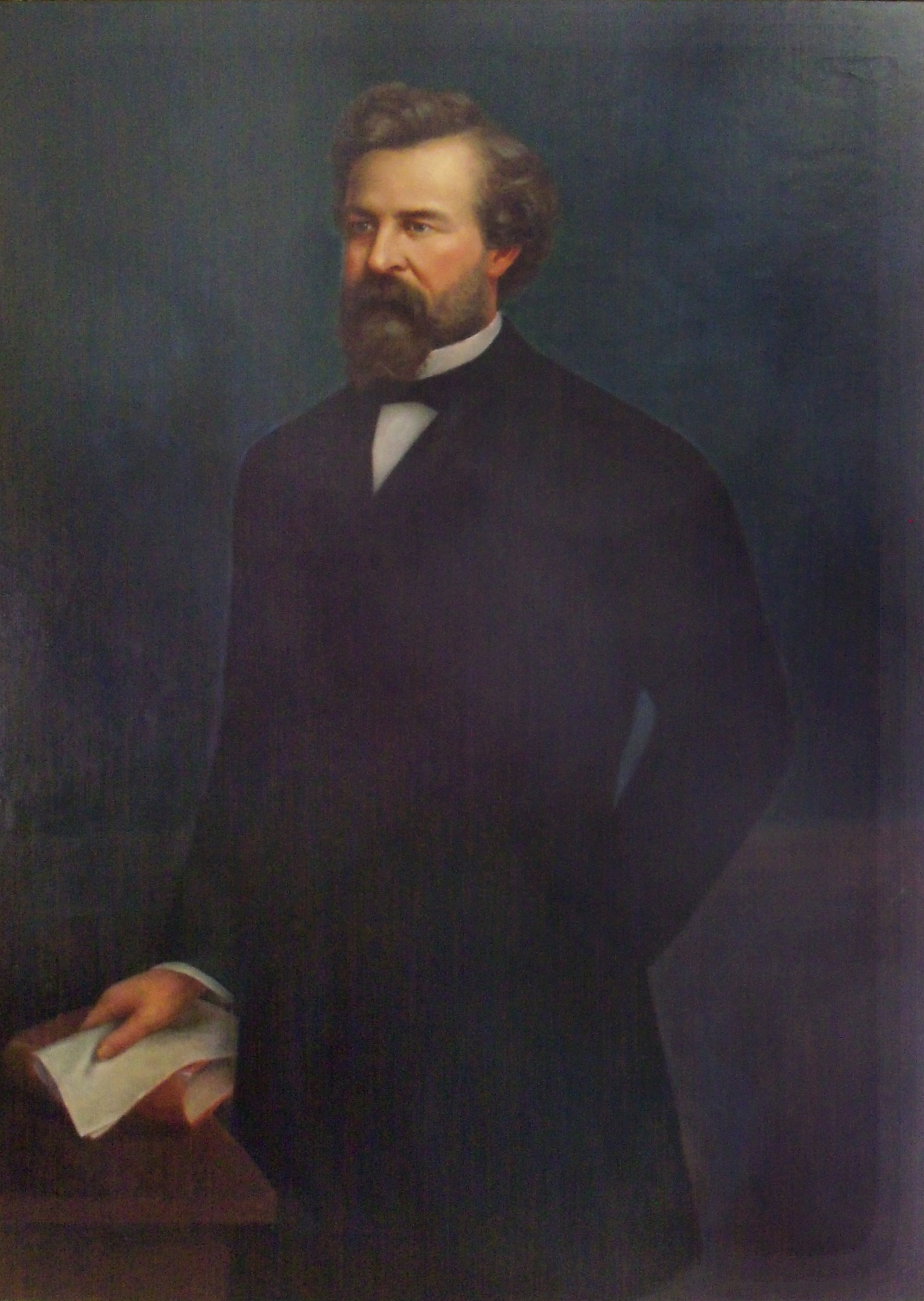
- Painting at Daniel McCook House

4th Ohio Attorney General
- In office January 9, 1854 – January 14, 1856
- Governor: William Medill
- Preceded by: George Ellis Pugh
- Succeeded by: Francis D. Kimball

Personal details
- Born: December 21, 1821 Canonsburg, Pennsylvania, US
- Died: December 28, 1877 (aged 56) Steubenville, Ohio, US
- Resting place: Union Cemetery, Steubenville
- Party: Democratic
- Relations: Fighting McCooks

Military service
- Allegiance: United States of America; Union
- Branch/service: United States Army; Union Army
- Years of service: 1846–1866
- Rank: Colonel; Ohio Adjutant General
- Commands: 2nd Ohio Infantry; 157th Ohio Infantry; Fort Delaware
- Battles/wars: Mexican-American War; American Civil War

George Wythe McCook (November 21, 1821 – December 28, 1877) was a lawyer, politician, and soldier from the state of Ohio in the United States. He was the Ohio Attorney General and an officer in the Union Army during the American Civil War. He was a member of the famed Fighting McCooks, a prominent military family that contributed more than a dozen officers to the war effort.

== Early life and career ==
McCook was born in Canonsburg, Pennsylvania, the son of a local attorney, Daniel McCook and Martha Latimer McCook. He was one of an eventual twelve children (nine boys and three girls). In 1826 the family moved to New Lisbon, Ohio, and then to Carrollton. He graduated from Ohio University and subsequently studied law with Edwin M. Stanton, and afterward became his partner. He served as an officer in the 3rd Ohio Infantry Regiment throughout the Mexican War, and returned from the war as its commander.

He was the Attorney General of Ohio from 1854 to 1856 and edited the first volume of the "Ohio State Reports." During his term in office, McCook specialized in railroad law. His skill in this area was noticed by the Steubenville and Indiana Railroad Company, and after his term ended, the company sent him to Europe on legal business.

McCook was a delegate to the 1860 Democratic National Convention in Charleston, South Carolina.

== Civil War service ==
At the war's outset, McCook was one of the first four brigadier generals selected by the Governor of Ohio to command the troops from that state, but, because of impaired health from his Mexican service, McCook was prevented from accepting that post. Later, he was appointed as the lieutenant colonel of the 2nd Ohio Infantry, and spent much of the war recruiting volunteers for several new regiments. He was named by Governor William Dennison as the Ohio Adjutant General.

Later, he accepted an appointment as the colonel of the 157th Ohio Infantry, Hundred Days Regiment. He was second-in-command of the prisoner-of-war camp at Fort Delaware.

At the end of the war, he received the brevet rank of brigadier general, dating from March 13, 1865.

== Postbellum career ==
After the war, McCook resumed his legal practice and political career. In 1871 he was the Democratic candidate for governor of Ohio. However, he lost to another former Union Army officer, Col. Edward F. Noyes, by more than twenty thousand votes.

He, with the Rev. Dr. Charles Beatty, were the largest contributors to the erection of the Second Presbyterian Church at Steubenville, Ohio, of which he was a trustee.

McCook died in Steubenville and is buried in Union Cemetery.

== See also ==
- List of Ohio's American Civil War generals

== Notes ==
Legal offices
Preceded by George Ellis Pugh	Attorney General of Ohio; 1854-1856	Succeeded by Francis D. Kimball
Party political offices
Preceded by George H. Pendleton	Democratic Party nominee for Governor of Ohio; 1871	Succeeded by William Allen
