= 1871 Ohio gubernatorial election =

- October 10, 1871
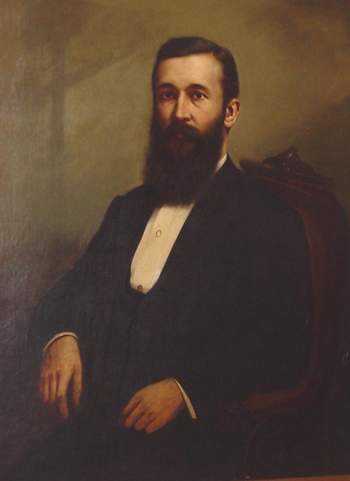

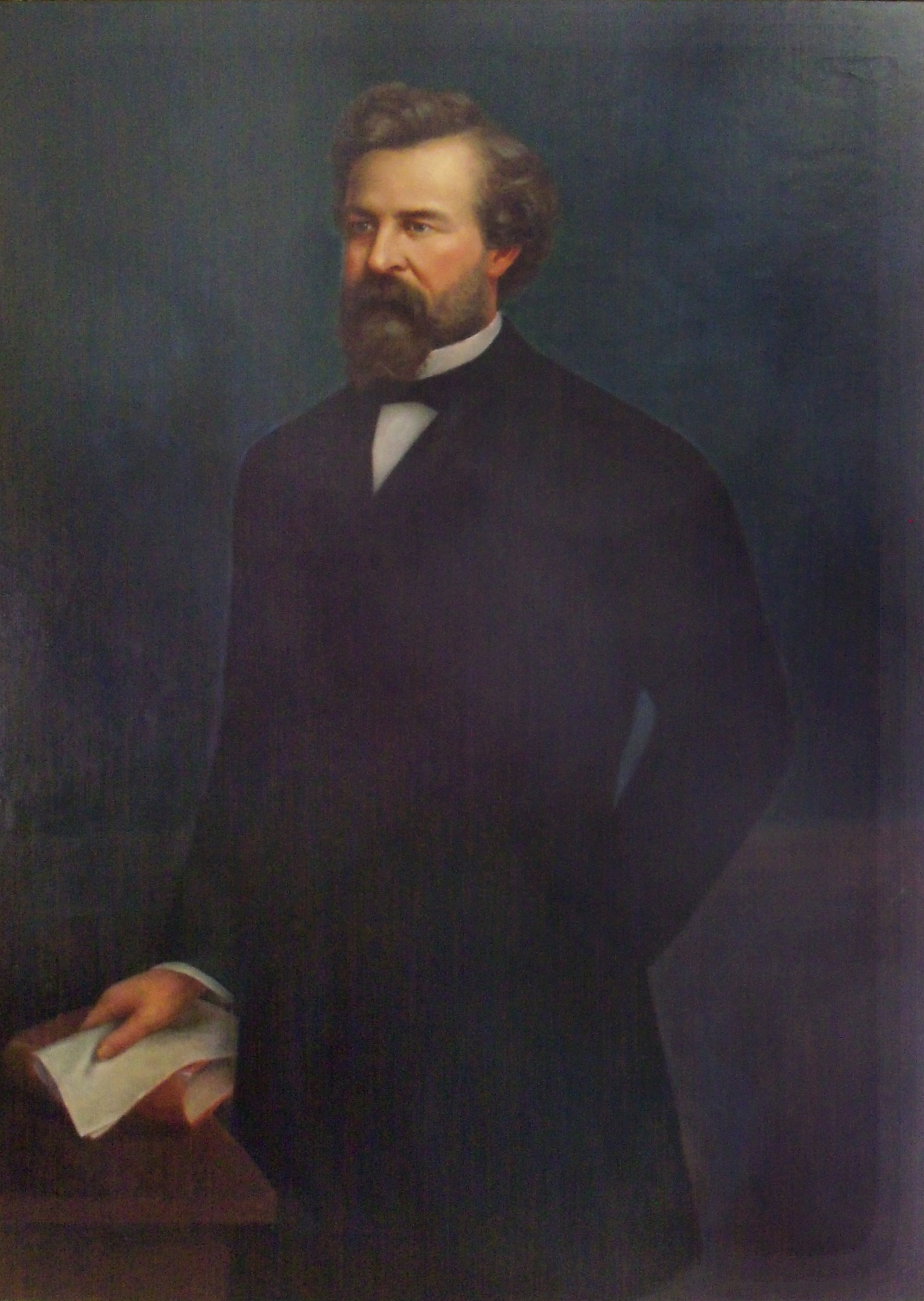
Nominee	Edward Follansbee Noyes	George Wythe McCook
Party	Republican	Democratic
Popular vote	238,273	218,105
Percentage	51.75%	47.37%
- County results Noyes: 50–60% 60–70% 70–80% 80–90% McCook: 50–60% 60–70% 70–80%
Governor before election
Rutherford B. Hayes
Republican
Elected Governor
Edward Follansbee Noyes
Republican

The 1871 Ohio gubernatorial election was held on October 10, 1871. Republican nominee Edward Follansbee Noyes defeated Democratic nominee George Wythe McCook with 51.75% of the vote.

== General election ==
=== Candidates ===
Major party candidates

- Edward Follansbee Noyes, Republican
- George Wythe McCook, Democratic

Other candidates

- Gideon T. Stewart, Prohibition

=== Results ===
1871 Ohio gubernatorial election
Party	Candidate	Votes	%	±%
Republican	Edward Follansbee Noyes (incumbent)	238,273	51.75%	
Democratic	George Wythe McCook	218,105	47.37%	
Prohibition	Gideon T. Stewart	4,084	0.89%	
Majority		20,168		
Turnout				
Republican hold		Swing		
