= 157th Ohio Infantry Regiment =

- Active: May 15, 1864, to September 2, 1864
- Country: United States
- Allegiance: Union
- Branch: Infantry

The 157th Ohio Infantry Regiment, sometimes 157th Ohio Volunteer Infantry (or 157th OVI) was an infantry regiment in the Union Army during the American Civil War.

== Service ==
The 157th Ohio Infantry was organized at Camp Chase in Columbus, Ohio, and mustered in May 15, 1864, for 100 days service under the command of Colonel George Wythe McCook.

The regiment left Ohio for Baltimore, Maryland, May 17 and was assigned to Tyler's Command, VIII Corps. Duty in the defenses of Baltimore and at Fort Delaware guarding Confederate prisoners until September.

The 157th Ohio Infantry mustered out of service September 2, 1864, at Camp Chase.

== Ohio National Guard ==
Over 35,000 Ohio National Guardsmen were federalized and organized into regiments for 100 days service in May 1864. Shipped to the Eastern Theater, they were designed to be placed in "safe" rear areas to protect railroads and supply points, thereby freeing regular troops for Lt. Gen. Ulysses S. Grant’s push on the Confederate capital of Richmond, Virginia. As events transpired, many units found themselves in combat, stationed in the path of Confederate Gen. Jubal Early’s veteran Army of the Valley during its famed Valley Campaigns of 1864. Ohio Guard units met the battle-tested foe head on and helped blunt the Confederate offensive thereby saving Washington, D.C. from capture. Ohio National Guard units participated in the battles of Monacacy, Fort Stevens, Harpers Ferry, and in the siege of Petersburg.

== Casualties ==
The regiment lost 10 enlisted men during service, all due to disease.

== Commanders ==
- Colonel George Wythe McCook

== See also ==
- List of Ohio Civil War units
- Ohio in the Civil War
