= Lyman R. Critchfield =

American politician

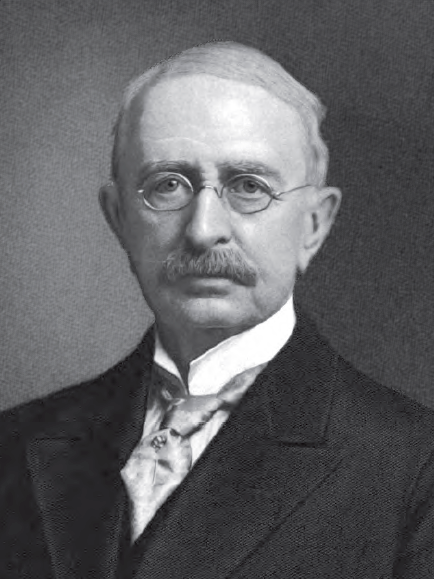

8th Ohio Attorney General
- In office January 12, 1863 – January 9, 1865
- Governor: David Tod; John Brough
- Preceded by: James Murray
- Succeeded by: William P. Richardson

Personal details
- Born: May 22, 1831 Danville, Ohio
- Died: November 28, 1917 (aged 86) Millersburg, Ohio
- Party: Democratic
- Spouse: Adelaide Margaret Shaffer
- Children: Seven
- Education: Ohio Wesleyan University
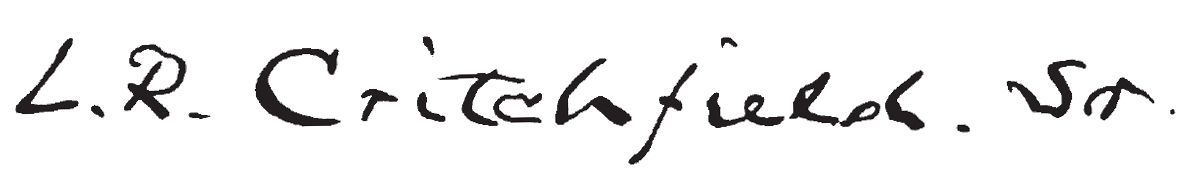
- Signature

Lyman R. Critchfield (May 22, 1831 – November 28, 1917) was a Democratic politician from the state of Ohio. He was Ohio Attorney General from 1863 to 1865.

Lyman R. Critchfield was born May 22, 1831, at Danville, Knox County, Ohio. His family moved to Millersburg, Holmes County, Ohio, in 1834. He attended public schools and graduated from Ohio Wesleyan University. He then studied law and was admitted to the bar in 1853, when he began practicing in Millersburg. He was elected Prosecuting Attorney of Holmes County in 1859 and re-elected in 1861. He resigned in 1862 when elected as State Attorney General.

In 1862 Critchfield was nominated by the Democratic Party for Attorney General, and defeated Republican Chauncey N. Olds in the general election. In 1864, he ran again and was defeated by Republican William P. Richardson. In 1868 he lost the election for Ohio's 14th congressional district to Martin Welker.

In 1887, he was nominated for Supreme Court Judge, but lost to Republican William T. Spear. In 1888 he tried again and lost to Joseph Perry Bradbury.

Lyman R. Critchfield married Adelaide Margaret Shaffer on October 2, 1854, and had seven children. He was a Mason, and Methodist Episcopal by faith. In later years he lived in Wooster, Ohio. Adelaide burned to death in 1895, and Lyman died at his desk at Millersburg in 1917.

== Notes ==
Legal offices
Preceded by James Murray	Ohio Attorney General; 1863–1865	Succeeded by William P. Richardson
