= Paul M. Cobbs =

American politician (1838–1890)

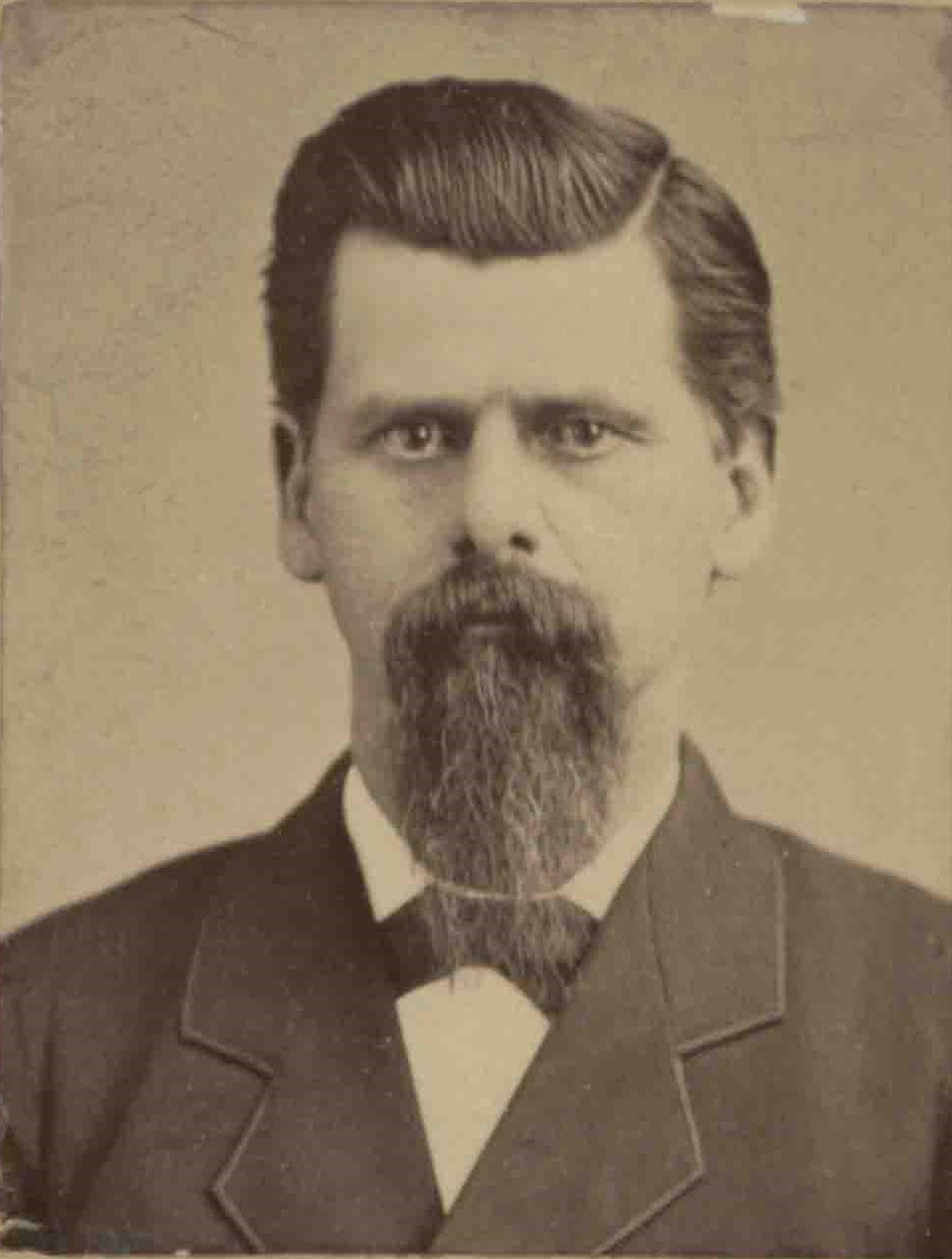
Paul M. Cobbs - Clerk - Arkansas Legislature 1881

Paul M. Cobbs (December 15, 1838-February 21, 1890) was a state legislator in Arkansas. He served in the Arkansas House of Representatives in 1881. He served as Clerk of the House of Representatives that term. He was a Democrat.

He was born in Somerville, Tennessee to John and Elizabeth W. Cobbs.

He organized a company and served as a captain, major, and lieutenant colonel in the Confederate Army. He served as Arkansas Commissioner of State Lands from 1884-1890.

He married twice.

== See also ==
- 30th Arkansas Infantry Regiment
