= Tommy Land =

American politician (born 1955)

Land Commissioner of Arkansas
- Incumbent
- Assumed office January 15, 2019
- Governor: Asa Hutchinson; Sarah Huckabee Sanders
- Preceded by: John Thurston

Personal details
- Born: August 18, 1955 (age 71) Haines City, Florida, U.S.
- Party: Republican
- Spouse: Judy Land (m. 1977)
- Children: 2

Tommy Land (born August 18, 1955) is an American businessman and politician from Arkansas. A Republican, he was elected on November 6, 2018, as the next Arkansas Commissioner of State Lands, and assumed office in January 2019. He won re-election in 2022.

== Early life and education ==
Land was born in Haines City, Florida. While in high school (circa 1972), he and his family moved to Heber Springs, Arkansas, the county seat of Cleburne County in the north central part of the state. Land graduated from Heber Springs High School.

After completing his education, Land began a career with Southwestern Bell. Land had an early interest in real estate and bought his first home at age 19 after persuading a judge to grant him "adult" status to sign the real estate contract.

== Political career ==
Land became involved in politics in the early 2010s. In a 2016 interview, he said he was serving as the chairman of the first district for the Arkansas Republican Party. Land was one of six Arkansas Republican presidential electors for Donald Trump and Mike Pence in the 2016 Electoral College. In a Family Council survey of 2018 Arkansas candidates, Land said as Commissioner of State Lands he would "encourage all state offices to look for ways to make government more effective and less expensive."

== Electoral history ==
Land's bid to be the Republican candidate for Land Commissioner was uncontested in the 2018 primary after Alex Ray, from Bryant, dropped out of the race in February. Land faced Democrat Larry Williams in the general election and won with 60 percent of the vote. Land again was the Republican candidate for Land Commissioner in 2022, and he was elected on November 8.

Arkansas Commissioner of State Lands election, 2018
Party	Candidate	Votes	%
Republican	Tommy Land	527,948	60.09
Democratic	Larry Williams	321,749	36.62
Libertarian	T.J. Campbell	28,948	3.29
Majority		206,199	23.47%
Total votes		878,645	100
Republican hold			

== Personal life ==
Land married his wife, Judy, circa 1977. They have a daughter and a son together. He retired from Southwestern Bell after 30 years of working in construction and customer service, circa 2003. After that, Land started his own digital telephone and computer networking company. Land acquired a real estate licence in 2016 and the family has leased mineral rights from their property, also operating a cattle farm. Judy was elected as Cleburne County assessor in 2014.

Party political offices
Preceded by John Thurston	Republican nominee for Land Commissioner of Arkansas; 2018, 2022	Succeeded by Cole Jester
Political offices
Preceded by John Thurston	Land Commissioner of Arkansas; 2019–present	Incumbent
