= William Henry Grey =

American politician

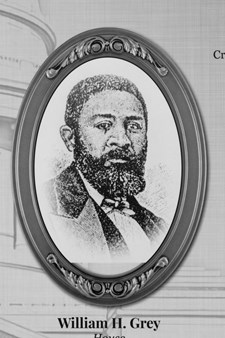

Member of the Arkansas Senate from the 14th district
- Preceded by: J. W. Wiliams
- Succeeded by: A. L. Stanford

2nd Arkansas Commissioner of Immigration and State Lands
- In office October 15, 1872 – 1874
- Preceded by: J. M. Lewis
- Succeeded by: J. N. Smithee

Member of the Arkansas House of Representatives from the 11th district
- In office April 2, 1868 – April 10, 1869 Serving with J. A. Butler, M. Reed, J.C. Tobias, J.T. White, J.K. Whitson
- Preceded by: New constituency

Personal details
- Born: December 22, 1829 Washington, D.C.
- Died: November 8, 1888 (aged 58) Helena, Arkansas
- Party: Republican

William Henry Grey (December 22, 1829, in Washington, D.C. – November 8, 1888, in Helena, Arkansas) was a state legislator, storeowner and church leader in Arkansas. He served in various elected and public offices in the state during the Reconstruction era. The Encyclopedia of Arkansas calls Grey "a tireless fighter for the rights of freedmen." In 1868 he was among the first six African Americans who served in the Arkansas House. His gravesite in Magnolia Cemetery was listed on the National Register of Historic Places in 2019.

== Biography ==
Grey was born a free person of color in December 1829 in Washington, D.C., and moved with his family to Pittsburgh, Pennsylvania, and then to Cincinnati, Ohio, in the 1840s. In 1852, as an adult, he moved to St. Louis, Missouri, and found work as a cook on Mississippi River steamboats. In 1854, he wed Henrietta Winslow, who became the mother of his eight children. A member of the African Methodist Episcopal Church, he was called to the ministry and became an AME lay minister. At some point he moved his family south from Missouri to the Arkansas Delta, a region with which he would already have been familiar through his steamboat duties.

=== Reconstruction ===
In 1865, the closing year of the American Civil War, Grey lived in Helena, Arkansas and was the operator and part-proprietor of a grocery and bakery. He participated in the Little Rock African-American convention that year, a gathering called to discuss the community's response to the ratification of the Thirteenth Amendment and the formal end of slavery in the United States.

In 1868, Grey was elected as a representative from Phillips County to the 1868 Arkansas Constitutional Convention, one of eight African-American delegates. The atmosphere of the 1868 convention was embittered by resentments stemming from the war. A minority of delegates, described as "Conservatives," fought to prevent African-Americans from possessing the right to vote. Another issue was inter-racial marriage. Grey served on four of the convention's standing committees, including those dealing with education and the right to vote. The new Arkansas constitution was ratified statewide with Republican support.

As the new Arkansas government came into being, Grey's Phillips County neighbors elected him to the Arkansas House of Representatives serving the 11th district (Phillips and Monroe County) alongside five other members during the 17th Arkansas General Assembly.

Grey subsequently briefly filled a vacancy in the Arkansas Senate in 1875. Grey was elected clerk of the First Circuit Court and ex-officio Recorder of Deeds in 1870. In 1872, he was a delegate to the 1872 Republican National Convention held in Philadelphia. He was selected to co-second the nomination of Ulysses S. Grant for a second term as U.S. President. His speech is believed to have been the first address spoken by an African American to a presidential nominating convention of a major U.S. political party. Grey also, in 1872, took on the duties of Arkansas Commissioner of Immigration and State Lands, as the state had not yet been fully settled and was highly dependent upon additional immigrants. He had to lay down these duties in 1874 after suffering a possible stroke. Grey returned to Helena and was selected as clerk of the Phillips County probate and county courts. He won a special election to serve a partial term in the Arkansas Senate during the 20th Arkansas General Assembly following the death of J. W. Wiliams.

=== Jim Crow era ===
In the 1870s, severe reverses struck Grey. The 1868 state constitution that he had helped to write was thrown out in 1874 and replaced by a new document, supported by many former Confederates. This constitution re-opened the door to Jim Crow government. In September 1878, Grey was paralyzed, an event believed to have been caused by a second and disabling stroke. The Democratic Party of Arkansas, which at that time was strongly oriented toward ex-Confederate interests, regained political control of Phillips County in the same year. This development permanently silenced Grey's voice in public affairs. He lived in obscurity until his death.

== Legacy and honors ==
Grey was called by historian Harry Ashmore "the outstanding black leader of the period" in Arkansas.

== Quote ==
- "We are here to receive the amount due us from the State of Arkansas. Pay us, sir, the rights and privileges due us as citizens of the United States and the State of Arkansas."
