= Edward Follansbee Noyes =

American politician (1832–1890)

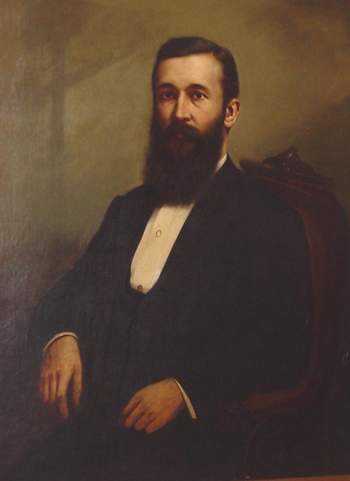
- 1874 painting by John Henry Witt

United States Minister to France
- In office September 5, 1877 – August 5, 1881
- Nominated by: Rutherford B. Hayes
- Preceded by: Elihu B. Washburne
- Succeeded by: Levi P. Morton

30th Governor of Ohio
- In office January 8, 1872 – January 12, 1874
- Lieutenant: Jacob Mueller
- Preceded by: Rutherford B. Hayes
- Succeeded by: William Allen

Personal details
- Born: October 3, 1832 Haverhill, Massachusetts, U.S.
- Died: September 4, 1890 (aged 57) Cincinnati, Ohio, U.S.
- Resting place: Spring Grove Cemetery, Cincinnati, Ohio
- Party: Republican
- Spouse: Margaret W. Proctor
- Education: Dartmouth College; Cincinnati Law School

Military service
- Allegiance: United States
- Branch/service: United States Army; Union Army
- Years of service: 1861–1865
- Rank: Brevet Brigadier General
- Commands: Camp Dennison
- Battles/wars: American Civil War

Edward Follansbee Noyes (October 3, 1832 – September 4, 1890) was a Republican politician from Ohio. Noyes served as the 30th governor of Ohio.

== Biography ==
Noyes was born in Haverhill, Massachusetts. He was orphaned at the age of three and was raised in New Hampshire by his grandfather and a guardian. At the age of thirteen, he was apprenticed to the printer of The Morning Star, a religious newspaper published in Dover, New Hampshire. He remained an apprentice for over four years until he left to enter an academy in Kingston, New Hampshire. He graduated from Dartmouth College in 1857 (4th in a class of 57 students), then moved to Cincinnati, Ohio, and attended the Cincinnati Law School.

Noyes served in the Union Army during the Civil War. He helped organize the 39th Ohio Infantry, and was rewarded with a commission as its first major on July 27, 1861. Within a few months, he had become the regiment's colonel.

Noyes married Margaret W. Proctor at Kingston, New Hampshire in February, 1863, while on leave from the army.

He was severely wounded in his ankle in a skirmish at Ruff's Mill on July 4, 1864, during the Atlanta campaign and, as a result, had his left leg amputated. Three months later, Maj. Gen. Joseph Hooker assigned Noyes, who was still recuperating and using crutches, to the command of Camp Dennison near Cincinnati, breveted him as a brigadier general. Noyes commanded the post until April 22, 1865, when he resigned to become city solicitor.

He was elected in October 1866 as the probate judge of Hamilton County.

He was elected to the governorship in 1871, besting another former Union Army officer, Col. George W. McCook, by more than twenty thousand votes. He served one two-year term between 1872–74, pushing for stricter coal mine inspection laws and promoting fish conservation. He lost re-election in 1873 by 817 votes, 50.1% - 49.9%.

In 1874, he was appointed an Ohio Commissioner of the Centennial Exposition in Philadelphia

He later served as Rutherford B. Hayes's Minister to France from 1877 to 1881, a patronage reward for his strong support of his fellow Buckeye soldier during Hayes' presidential campaign.

He died on September 4, 1890, in Cincinnati, Ohio. He was buried in Spring Grove Cemetery in Cincinnati, Ohio.

== Notes ==
Political offices
Preceded by Rutherford B. Hayes	Governor of Ohio; 1872 – 1874	Succeeded by William Allen
Diplomatic posts
Preceded by Elihu B. Washburne	U.S. Minister to France; 1877 – 1881	Succeeded by Levi P. Morton
Party political offices
Preceded by Rutherford B. Hayes	Republican Party nominee for Governor of Ohio; 1871, 1873	Succeeded by Rutherford B. Hayes
