= Arkansas Commissioner of State Lands =

Executive government position in Arkansas, U.S.

Commissioner of State Lands
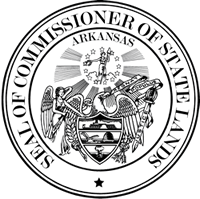
- Seal of the Commissioner of State Lands
- Incumbent; Tommy Land
- Style: The Honorable
- Term length: Four years Two terms (Note: Amendment 73 of the Arkansas Constitution imposed term limits on constitutional officers, including State Land Commissioner. It was passed in 1992, and took effect in 1998.)
- Constituting instrument: Arkansas Constitution
- Precursor: Commissioner of Immigration and State Lands (1868–1874)
- Formation: 1868
- First holder: J. M. Lewis
- Succession: Appointment (1868–1874); Election (1874–present)
- Website: Official website

The Arkansas Commissioner of State Lands is an executive position and constitutional officer within the Arkansas government which has been an elective post since 1874. Land Commissioners are elected to four year terms. The current state Land Commissioner is Republican Tommy Land.

== Powers and duties ==
The Land Commissioner is responsible for collecting delinquent taxes on real estate through public auction whenever parcels are certified as such by county tax collectors. The proceeds from each sale of tax delinquent property are dedicated to public schools throughout the state. The Land Commissioner also serves as leasing agent for oil, natural gas, sand and gravel deposits on state lands, administers the beds of navigable rivers and streams, and is custodian of Arkansas' original land records.

== History ==
The position was created by the Arkansas General Assembly as the Commissioner of Immigration and State Lands in 1868. had control over public works in the state, which eventually included road improvements. Under the Arkansas Constitution of 1874, (Note: The Constitution of 1874 is the current constitution.) the position became an elected office. The highway duties were so important to the position it was referred to as the Highway Commissioner everywhere except official state documents.

In 1929, the General Assembly passed a measure to abolish the position of Highway Commissioner as an elected office in response to corruption in the highway system. However, the measure did not have authority to abolish a constitutional office. The General Assembly instead assigned the highway-related duties to the Arkansas State Highway Commission, which became an appointed office. Dwight Blackwood, the incumbent office holder, transitioned to the State Highway Commission, and his sister, Belva Martin was appointed to the State Land Commissioner position. She won election in her own right in 1930, but did not seek reelection in 1932. Martin was the first woman to seek the Democratic nomination for a statewide office in Arkansas, and as of February 2018, she remains the only female to hold the office.

== List of Arkansas Commissioners of State Lands ==
No. (Note: Acting auditors are not numbered.)	Name	Party (Note: Appointed and acting auditors do not have a party listed.)	Service	Notes
1	J. M. Lewis	None	July 2, 1868 – October 15, 1872	
2	William Henry Grey	Republican	October 15, 1872 – June 5, 1874	
3	J. N. Smithee	Democratic	June 5, 1874 – November 18, 1878	First elected Commissioner
4	D. W. Lear	Democratic	October 31, 1878 – October 30, 1882	
5	William P. Campbell	Democratic	October 30, 1882 – March 31, 1884	
6	Paul M. Cobbs	Democratic	March 31, 1884 – February 1890	Died in office
7	C. B. Meyers	Democratic	February 12, 1890 – October 30, 1894	Initially appointed, seated via election October 30, 1890
8	J. F. Ritchie	Democratic	October 30, 1894 – October 30, 1898	
9	J. W. Colquitt	Democratic	October 30, 1898 – October 30, 1902	
10	F. E. Conway	Democratic	October 30, 1902 – October 30, 1906	
11	Lafayette L. Coffman	Democratic	October 31, 1906 – October 31, 1910	
12	Reuben G. Dye	Democratic	October 31, 1910 – October 31, 1914	Beginning April 1, 1913 led the Department of State Lands, Highways, and Improvements
13	William B. Owen	Democratic	November 1, 1914 – January 1, 1921	
14	Herbert R. Wilson	Democratic	January 1, 1921 – January 1, 1927	
15	Dwight H. Blackwood	Democratic	1927–1929	Resigned
16	Belva Martin	Democratic	1929–1933	Initially appointed, later seated via election, first Commissioner of State Lands
17	George W. Neal	Democratic	1933–1937	
18	Otis Page	Democratic	1937–1943	
19	Bish Bentley	Democratic	1943	
20	Claude Rankin	Democratic	1943–1954	Died in office
21	Red Jones	Democratic	1954–1957	
22	Sam Jones	Democratic	1957–1981	
23	Bill McCuen	Democratic	1981–1985	
24	Charlie Daniels	Democratic	1985–2003	
25	Mark Wilcox	Democratic	2003–2011	
25	John Thurston	Republican	2011–2019	
26	Tommy Land	Republican	2019–Present	
