= William Allen (governor) =

American politician (1803–1879)

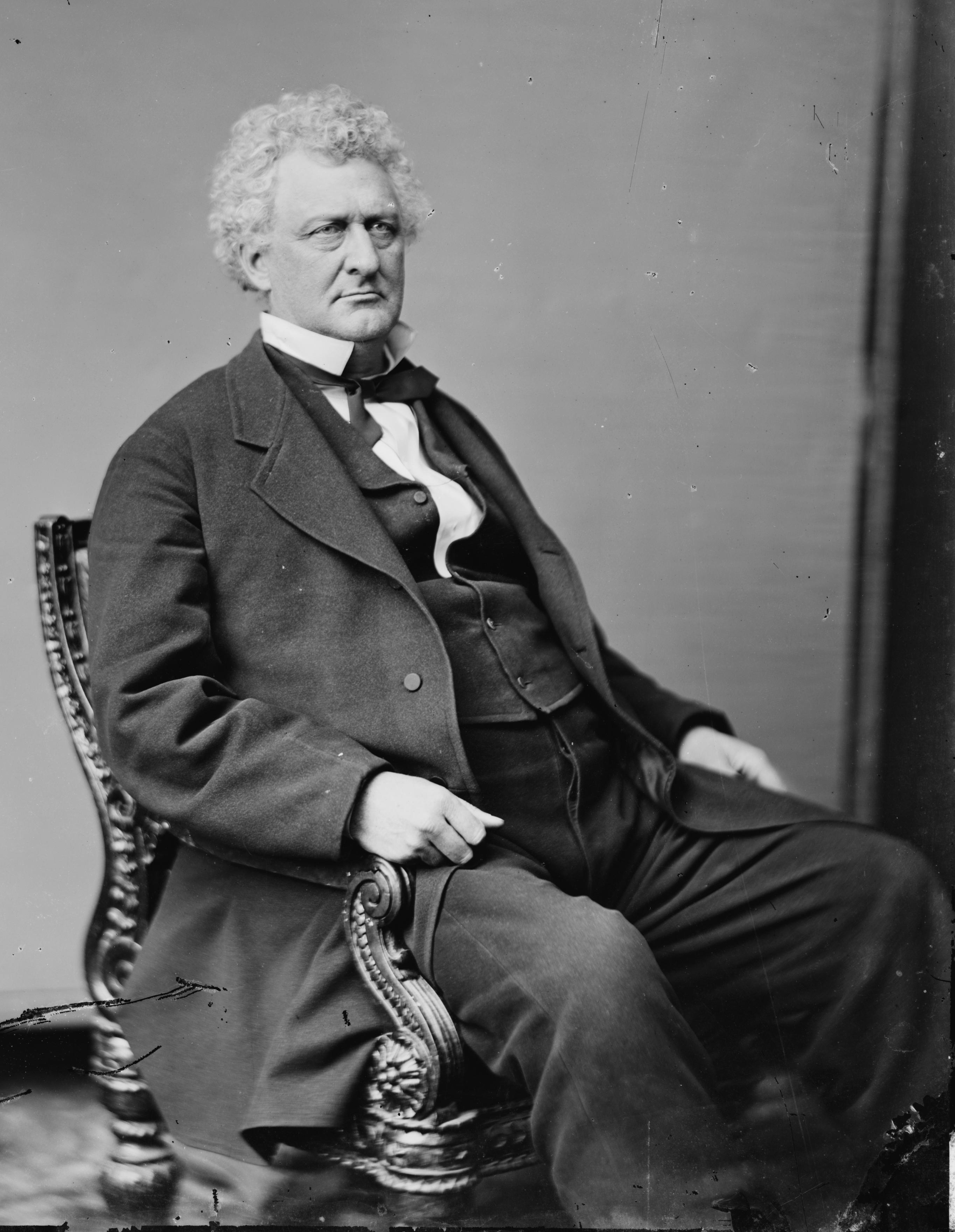
- Allen, 1860–1875

31st Governor of Ohio
- In office January 12, 1874 – January 10, 1876
- Lieutenant: Alphonso Hart
- Preceded by: Edward F. Noyes
- Succeeded by: Rutherford B. Hayes

United States Senator from Ohio
- In office March 4, 1837 – March 3, 1849
- Preceded by: Thomas Ewing
- Succeeded by: Salmon P. Chase

Member of the U.S. House of Representatives from Ohio's 7th district
- In office March 4, 1833 – March 3, 1835
- Preceded by: Samuel Finley Vinton
- Succeeded by: William K. Bond

Personal details
- Born: December 18 or 27, 1803 Edenton, North Carolina, U.S.
- Died: July 11, 1879 (aged 75) Fruit Hill, Chillicothe, Ohio, U.S.
- Resting place: Grandview Cemetery, Chillicothe
- Party: Democratic
- Spouse: Effie McArthur
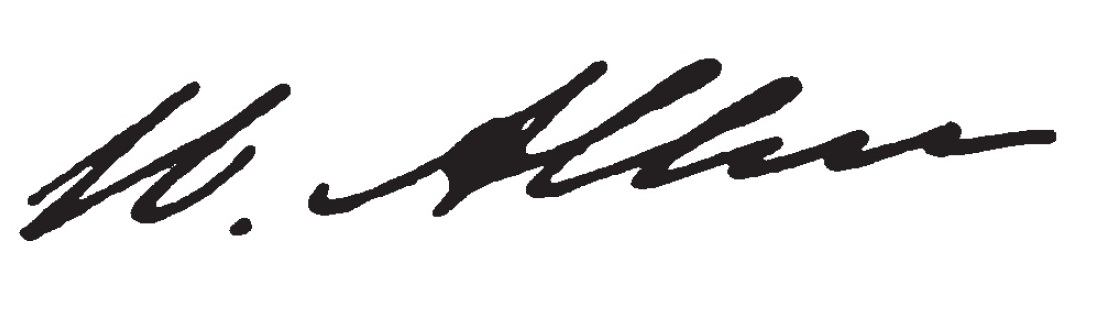
- Signature

William Allen (December 18 or 27, 1803 – July 11, 1879) was an American lawyer and politician who served as a Democratic representative, senator and 31st governor of Ohio.

== Early life and family ==
Allen was born in Edenton, North Carolina. His father was Nathanial Allen (1755–1805). His mother was Fanny Coulston, an enslaved woman who was either owned by his father or had been his mistress. Upon the death of his mother, he and his brother Frances Allen William moved to Lynchburg, Virginia. In 1819, he moved to live with his sister in Chillicothe, Ohio.

His father made the following arrangements in his will. "I give and devise that part of lot # 5 in the new plan of the town of Edenton joining the lots wheron I now dwell and as far as the same is at present under fence with all the improvements thereon to Fanny Coulston her heirs and assigns forever. I also give and bequeath unto the said Fanny Coulston her heirs and assigns such part of my household and kitchen furniture as my executors hereinafter named, shall judge reasonable and necessary, due regard being paid to the situation of my estate and the interest of her children. I give and bequeath unto my three natural sons, Francis, Bonaparte, and William begotten on the body of the said Fanny Coulston, all my wearing apparel, including whatever remains or that left to me by my deceased Uncle Joseph Hewes, Esquire, to be equally divided among them share and share alike. Before the signing and the execution of the above Will, I do hereby declare it to be my further will and desire that the aforesaid Fanny Caulston shall have the use and labor of my negro woman named Penny for and during the term of three years."

Allen and his sister Mary Granberry Allen lived in Chillicothe together. His sister married Reverend Pleasant Thurman, and their son, Allen G. Thurman, followed in his uncle's footsteps, becoming a lawyer and politician.

Allen attended Chillicothe Academy before studying law with Colonel Edward King. He was admitted to the bar in Ohio at age 21. He began his career as a politician in the Democratic Party at a young age.

== Career ==
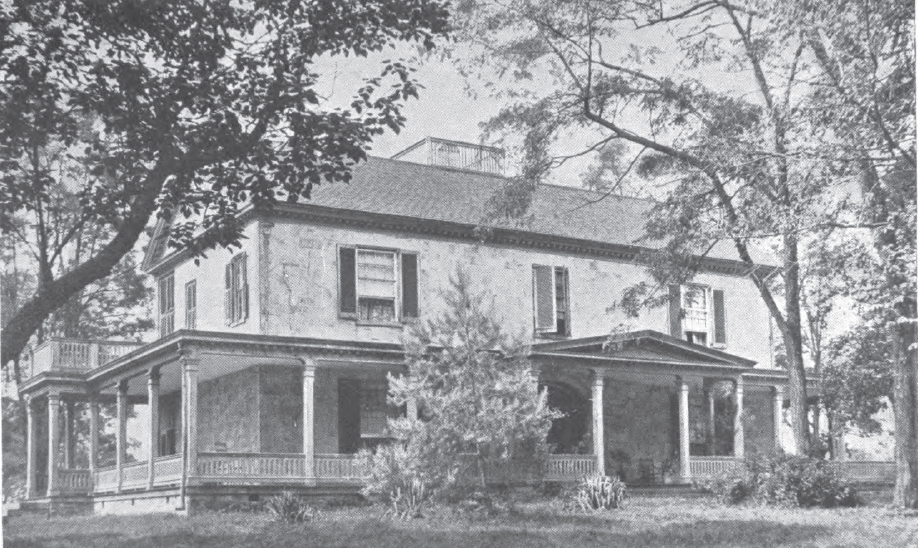
Fruit Hill (home of McArthur and Allen

Allen served as United States Representative from Ohio from 1833 to 1835, losing his bid for re-election.

=== Senate ===
He served as United States Senator from Ohio from 1837 to 1849, losing a bid for a third term in 1848.

While in the Senate, Allen was one of a group of Western Democrat expansionists who asserted that the U.S. had a valid claim to the entire Oregon Country, which was an issue during the 1844 U.S. presidential election. He suggested that the United States should be prepared to go to war with the United Kingdom to annex the entire Oregon Country up to Russian-owned Alaska at latitude 54°40′N. This position ultimately produced the slogan "Fifty-Four Forty or Fight!," coined in 1846 by opponents of such a policy (not, as popularly believed, a slogan in the 1844 Presidential campaign). Allen supported "popular sovereignty" and the presidential candidacy of fellow-Democrat Lewis Cass in 1848.

In 1849, Allen retired to his farm, "Fruit Hill", which had belonged to his father-in-law, and fellow Ohio Governor, Duncan McArthur, near Chillicothe, Ohio. Allen identified himself as a "Peace Democrat" by opposing the American Civil War.

=== Governorship ===
Allen did not return to public service for nearly a quarter century until he served as governor of Ohio from 1874 to 1876. He unsuccessfully sought a second two-year term in an 1875 election.

Allen was noted for his loud voice. A friend asked Senator Benjamin Tappan if a fellow Ohioan was still in Washington. Tappan replied, "No, he left yesterday and is probably by this time in Cumberland, Maryland, but if you will go to Bill Allen and tell him to raise that window and call him, he will come back."

== Death and burial ==
At the close of his administration, he retired to private life at Fruit Hill, where he died in 1879. Allen is buried at Grandview Cemetery, Chillicothe.

== Legacy ==
Allen County, Kansas, is named for William Allen.

In 1887, Ohio donated a statue of Allen to the National Statuary Hall Collection, which was exhibited in the National Statuary Hall of the U.S. Capitol. The statue was sculpted by Charles H. Niehaus. In 2010, the Ohio Historical Society held a statewide poll on the suitability of Allen as a distinguished representative of the state. The poll found that many Ohioans objected to Allen. On August 26, the Ohio National Statuary Committee voted to replace Allen's statue with a statue of Ohio-born inventor Thomas Edison. The Ohio General Assembly agreed to replace the statue in part because "Allen’s pro-slavery position and outspoken criticism of President Abraham Lincoln during the Civil War make him a poor representative for Ohio in the U.S. Capitol." However, lack of funding for the Edison statue delayed replacement of the Allen statue. The Edison statue was completed in spring 2015, and was installed on September 20, 2016. The statue of Allen was relocated to the Ross County Heritage Center in Chillicothe.

U.S. House of Representatives
Preceded by Samuel Finley Vinton	U.S. Representative from Ohio, 7th District; 1833–1835	Succeeded by William K. Bond
U.S. Senate
Preceded by Thomas Ewing	U.S. senator (Class 3) from Ohio; 1837–1849; Served alongside: Thomas Morris, Benjamin Tappan, Thomas Corwin	Succeeded by Salmon P. Chase
Political offices
Preceded by Edward F. Noyes	Governor of Ohio; 1874–1876	Succeeded by Rutherford B. Hayes
Party political offices
Preceded by George Wythe McCook	Democratic Party nominee for Governor of Ohio; 1873, 1875	Succeeded by Richard M. Bishop
