= James Murray (Ohio politician) =

American politician

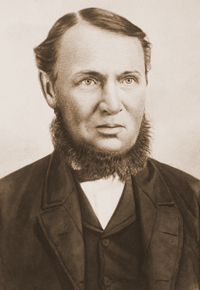

7th Ohio Attorney General
- In office January 14, 1861 – January 12, 1863
- Governor: William Dennison; David Tod
- Preceded by: Christopher Wolcott
- Succeeded by: Lyman R. Critchfield

Personal details
- Born: 1830 Scotland
- Died: 1879 (aged 48–49) Sidney, Ohio
- Party: Republican

James Murray was a Republican politician from the state of Ohio. He was Ohio Attorney General in 1861 and 1862.

James Murray was born in Scotland about 1830. In 1831, when about a year old, his family moved to Sidney, Ohio. He was educated in the public schools, and admitted to the bar in 1851. He immediately relocated to Perrysburg, Ohio. He was elected Ohio Attorney General in 1860, and served one term. He remained a resident of Wood County, Ohio until the close of his term, and then returned to Sidney, where he died in 1879. The only other political office he ever held was as mayor of Perrysburg.

== Notes ==
Legal offices
Preceded by Christopher Wolcott	Ohio Attorney General; 1861-1863	Succeeded by Lyman R. Critchfield
