= Francis D. Kimball =

American politician

5th Ohio Attorney General
- In office January 14, 1856 – August 15, 1856
- Governor: Salmon P. Chase
- Preceded by: George Wythe McCook
- Succeeded by: Christopher Wolcott

Personal details
- Born: c. 1820 New Hampshire
- Died: August 15, 1856 Columbus, Ohio
- Party: Republican
- Other political affiliations: Whig

Francis D. Kimball (c. 1820 - 1856) was a Republican politician from the state of Ohio. He was Ohio Attorney General in 1856.

Kimball was born in about 1820 in New Hampshire. He was reared as a Whig and an Abolitionist. In 1842 he moved to Medina County, Ohio, and was soon elected to county office. He was prosecuting attorney of Medina County 1849–1853. He was a champion of the Anti-Nebraska Movement in 1854, and a founder of the Republican Party in Ohio. He attended the preliminary National Convention at Pittsburgh, and the first regular National Convention at Philadelphia, where he contracted a disease that would lead to his death. He was nominated for Ohio Attorney General, and won the election in 1855. He died August 15, 1856, and was succeeded as Attorney General by Christopher P. Wolcott of Summit County by appointment of Governor Salmon P. Chase.

== Notes ==
Legal offices
Preceded by George W. McCook	Attorney General of Ohio; 1856-1861	Succeeded by Christopher Wolcott
