= William P. Richardson (Ohio politician) =

American general and politician

William Pitt Richardson
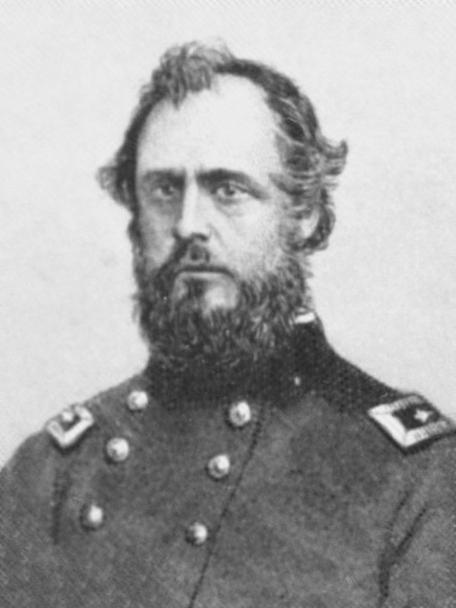

9th Ohio Attorney General
- In office January 9, 1865 – February 20, 1865
- Governor: John Brough
- Preceded by: Lyman R. Critchfield
- Succeeded by: Chauncey N. Olds

Personal details
- Born: May 25, 1824 Washington County, Pennsylvania, US
- Died: August 4, 1886 (aged 62) New Castle, Indiana, US
- Resting place: Oak Grove Cemetery, Marietta, Ohio
- Party: Republican
- Education: Washington College
- Occupation: lawyer

Military service
- Allegiance: United States
- Branch/service: Union Army
- Years of service: 1846–1848; 1861–1865
- Rank: Colonel; Bvt. Brigadier General
- Unit: 3rd Ohio Infantry
- Commands: 25th Ohio Infantry; Camp Chase
- Battles/wars: Mexican–American War; American Civil War; Battle of Chancellorsville

William Pitt Richardson (May 25, 1824 – August 4, 1886) was a Republican politician from the state of Ohio, USA. He was Ohio Attorney General in 1865.

Richardson was born on May 25, 1824, at Washington County, Pennsylvania. He entered Washington College in 1841, and graduated in 1844. He was then a teacher, and remained so after moving to Ohio. He enlisted as a private in the Third Ohio Infantry in 1846, and served in the Mexican–American War. In 1852, he was elected Prosecuting Attorney of Monroe County, Ohio, and held that office until 1861. During the Civil War, he enlisted as a Major in the 25th Ohio Infantry, was promoted to Lieutenant Colonel and Colonel. On May 2, 1863, at the Battle of Chancellorsville, he was wounded and lost use of his right arm.

In 1864, he was elected Ohio Attorney General, but resigned after less than a year, replaced by Chauncey N. Olds of Franklin County being appointed by Governor Brough. He was Brevetted Brigadier General in December 1864. The same year, he was named commander of the military prison at Camp Chase in Columbus, and was later Collector of Internal Revenue for the Fifteenth (Ohio) district. He died at New Castle, Indiana on August 4, 1886, and was interred at Oak Grove Cemetery in Marietta, Ohio.

His granddaughter, Rhea, was the mother of the famous American film director John Huston and grandmother of the actors Anjelica Huston and Danny Huston.

Legal offices
Preceded by Lyman R. Critchfield	Attorney General of Ohio; 1865	Succeeded by Chauncey N. Olds
