= Chauncey N. Olds =

American politician

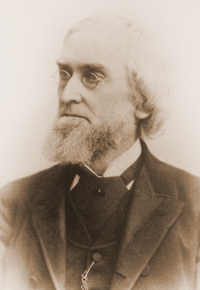

8th Ohio Attorney General
- In office February 20, 1865 – January 8, 1866
- Governor: John Brough; Charles Anderson
- Preceded by: William P. Richardson
- Succeeded by: William H. West

Member of the Ohio House of Representatives from the Pickaway County district
- In office December 4, 1848 – December 2, 1849
- Preceded by: Thomas Huston
- Succeeded by: M. L. Clark

Member of the Ohio Senate from the Ross & Pickaway Counties district
- In office December 3, 1849 – December 1, 1850
- Preceded by: new district
- Succeeded by: Joseph H. Geiger

Personal details
- Born: February 2, 1816 Marlboro, Vermont
- Died: February 11, 1890 (aged 74) Columbus, Ohio
- Party: Republican
- Other political affiliations: Whig
- Relations: brother Edson B. Olds
- Education: Miami University

Chauncey N. Olds was a Republican politician from the state of Ohio. He was Ohio Attorney General 1865.

== Early life and education ==
Chauncey Olds was born February 2, 1816, at Marlboro, Vermont, brother of Edson B. Olds. He was moved to Cuyahoga County, Ohio, at age four. In 1830, the family moved to Circleville, Pickaway County. He began studies at Ohio University that autumn, but quit after three years due to illness. He entered Miami University in 1834 and graduated in 1836.

== Career ==
Olds soon became a professor at Miami University after he graduated. He resigned in 1840, studied law, and was admitted to the bar in 1842 in Circleville. He practiced in that town until 1856, and represented the county in the Ohio House of Representatives for the 47th General Assembly, 1848–1849, and the Ohio State Senate 1849–1850, elected as a Whig. In 1856, he moved to Columbus, Ohio, and ran for Ohio Attorney General in the 1862 election, but lost.

In 1865, Attorney General William P. Richardson resigned, and Olds was appointed by Governor Brough on February 20, 1865. He was not nominated for the 1865 election.

== Personal life ==
He was a trustee of Miami University for twenty five years. He was prominent in the Presbyterian church. For the last seventeen years of his life, he represented the Pittsburgh, Cincinnati and St. Louis Railway in Franklin County.

He died on February 11, 1890 at his home in Columbus.

== Notes ==
Legal offices
Preceded by William P. Richardson	Ohio Attorney General; 1865-1866	Succeeded by William H. West
Ohio House of Representatives
Preceded by Thomas Huston	Representative from Pickaway County; 1848-1849	Succeeded by M.L. Clark
