= Christopher Wolcott =

American politician (1820–1863)

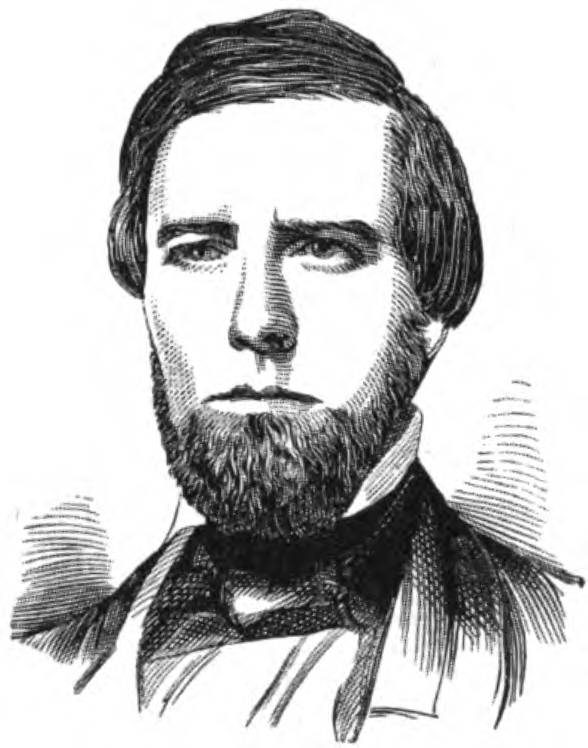

6th Ohio Attorney General
- In office 1856–1861
- Appointed by: Salmon P. Chase
- Preceded by: Francis D. Kimball
- Succeeded by: James Murray

United States Assistant Secretary of War
- In office 1862–1863
- Preceded by: John Tucker
- Succeeded by: Charles Anderson Dana

Personal details
- Born: December 17, 1820 Wolcott, Connecticut
- Died: April 4, 1863 (aged 42) Akron, Ohio
- Party: Republican
- Spouse: Pamphila Stanton
- Children: two sons

Christopher Parsons Wolcott (1820-1863) was a Republican politician from the state of Ohio. He was Ohio Attorney General 1856–1860 and United States Assistant Secretary of War from 1862 to 1863.

== Biography ==
Wolcott was born December 17, 1820, in Wolcott, Connecticut. In 1833 he was moved to Steubenville, Ohio, and attended public schools. He attended Washington College in Pennsylvania, where he graduated in 1840. He read law with Tappan & Stanton in Steubenville, and was admitted to the bar and began practice in Ravenna, Ohio. In Ravenna he partnered with Lucius V. Bierce. In 1846 he moved to Akron, Ohio. In Akron he partnered with William Otis, until Otis removed to Cleveland. He then partnered with William H. Upson, which lasted the rest of his life. In 1856, Governor Salmon P. Chase appointed him Ohio Attorney General to replace the deceased Francis D. Kimball. He was elected to a two-year term later in 1856, and another in 1858.

His cases as attorney general included the Breslin Treasury defalcation and the Wellington Rescue, where his arguments before the United States Supreme Court were widely celebrated.

Ohio Governor William Dennison named Wolcott to replace the deceased John C. Wright at the Peace Conference of 1861.

In May, 1862, Secretary of War, fellow Steubenville native and Wolcott's brother in law, Edwin M. Stanton asked him to be First Assistant Secretary during the American Civil War.

I know I ought not to ask it of you, and fear the work will kill you, but I do not know where to look for aid, and if I do not have it now, I must give up myself.

— Edwin Stanton, 1862

Stanton was prophetic, as under the strain of the job, Wolcott's health gave out, leading to his resignation February, 1863. He returned to Akron. After two months of suffering, he died there April 4, 1863.

== Notes ==
Political offices
Preceded by John Tucker	Assistant Secretary of War; 1862-1863	Succeeded by Charles Anderson Dana
Legal offices
Preceded by Francis D. Kimball	Ohio Attorney General; 1856-1861	Succeeded by James Murray
