= Jeannie Blackburn Moran =

American author and socialite

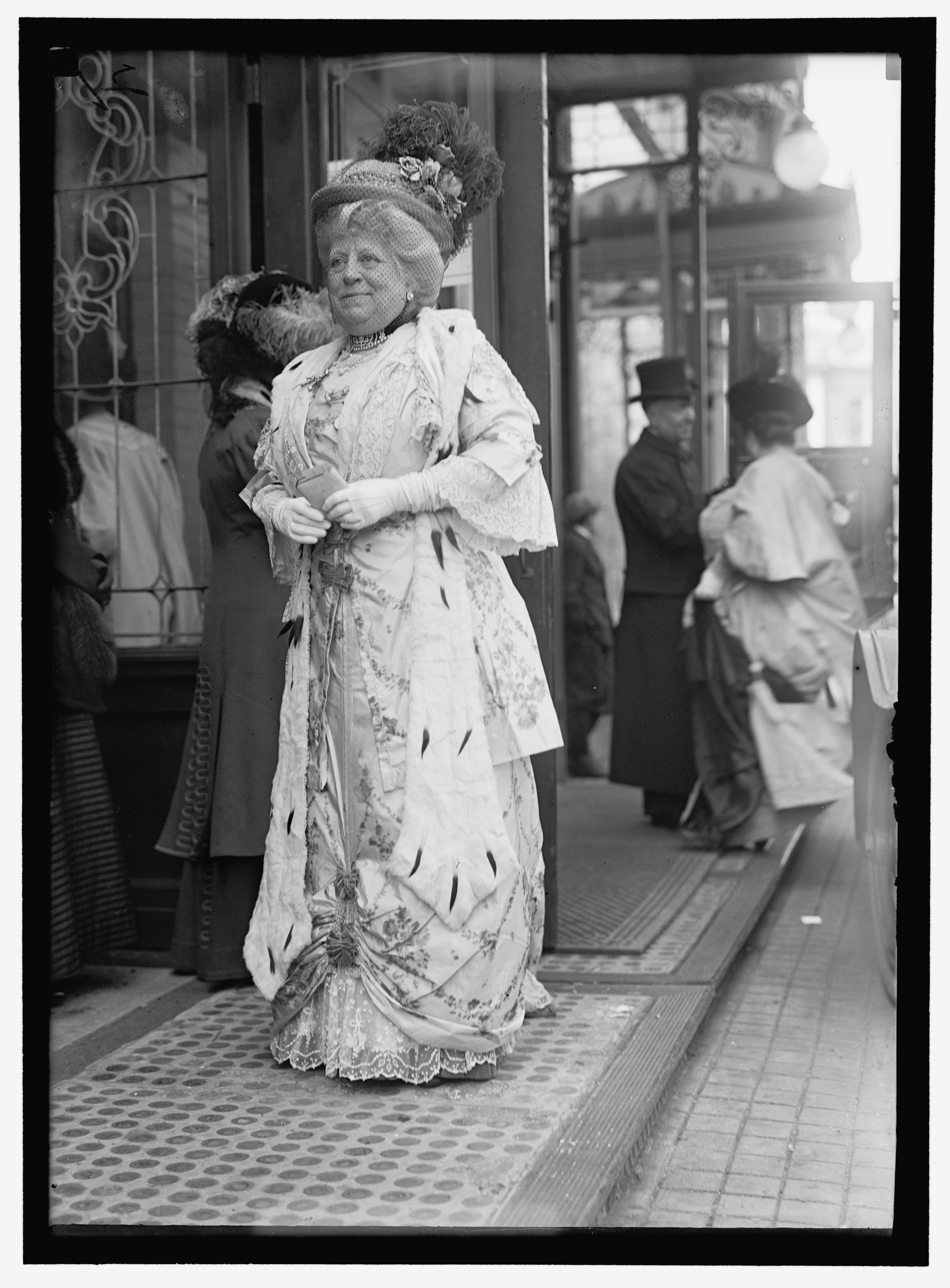
- Moran in 1913
- Born: Jane Wormley Blackburn; November 14, 1842 "Spring Grove", Jefferson County, Virginia (now West Virginia), U.S.
- Died: November 13, 1929 (aged 86); Washington, D.C., U.S.
- Resting place: Rock Creek Cemetery
- Occupations: author; community leader; socialite
- Spouse: Francois Elois Berger Moran (m. 1871)
- Children: 2
- Relatives: Thomas Blackburn; Bushrod Washington; Richard Scott Blackburn; Francis Thomas; Randolph Harrison McKim (cousin)
- Writing career
- Pen name: Mrs. F. Berger Moran
- Genre: novels
- Notable works: Miss Washington, of Virginia

Jeannie Blackburn Moran (née Blackburn; pen name Mrs. F. Berger Moran; 1842–1929) was an American author, community leader and socialite. A charter member of the Daughters of the American Revolution (DAR), United Daughters of the Confederacy (UDC), and Colonial Dames of America (CDA), she was closely associated with social and patriotic organizations based in Virginia and Washington, D.C. Proceeds from the sale of her work, Miss Washington, of Virginia, were used for the benefit of the DAR's Memorial Continental Hall.

== Early life ==
Jane Wormley Blackburn (nickname, "Jeannie") was born on the Blackburn estate of "Spring Grove", in Jefferson County, Virginia (now West Virginia), on November 14, 1842 (Note: According to Appleton (1926), Jeannie Blackburn Moran was born on May 1, 1850.) Her parents were Dr. Richard Scott Blackburn (d. 1867), physician, farmer, and part owner of a canal-boat freight business in Harpers Ferry, West Virginia, and Sarah Anne Eleanor McGill (Thomas) Blackburn.

The earliest representative of her family in the U.S. was Col. Richard Blackburn (1705–1757) of Colonial stock, who was Moran's great-great-grandfather. He came from Yorkshire, England, in 1730, and established his home in Prince William County, Virginia, naming it "Rippon Lodge" after the estate of his grandfather, Lord Blackburn, of England. Richard was an architect and the designer of Mount Vernon, as well as many other examples of Colonial architecture in Virginia, notably the Pohick Church Estate. His son, Col. Thomas Blackburn, a patriot of the Revolutionary War, served as aid-de-camp to General George Washington. Thomas married Christian, daughter of the Rev. James and Sarah (Brown) Scott of Dettingen Parish,Prince William County, Virginia; and their daughter, Annie, married in 1785 the favorite nephew of General Washington, Judge Bushrod Washington, associate Justice of the Supreme Court of the U.S., who inherited Mount Vernon from President Washington. Their eldest son, Capt. Richard Scott Blackburn, married Judith Ball, a relative of May Ball, who was George Washington's mother. their son, Major Thomas Blackburn, married Elizabeth, daughter of John and Margaret (Zenill) Sinclair, first cousin of Lord Sinclair of Cathesnest Castle, Scotland; and descended on the maternal side from the Zenill family who built the Mayflower and came to the u.S. on that vessel. Mrs. Moran father married, in 1833, Sarah, daughter of Col. John Thomas and Sarah Eleanor McGill, a descendant of the Episcopal clergyman, Rev. James McGill, who cooperated with Lords Calvert and Baltimore in securing church rights in Maryland and whose tomb bears the record that he was the last Earl of Orford, England.

Moran's mother was a sister of Francis Thomas, Governor of Maryland, who served as Minister to Peru from 1872 to 1875, and was a descendant of Betty Edwards, Maid of Honor to Queen Anne of England. A sister, Jane Charlotte, married John Augustine Washington, 2d, a nephew of Justice Bushrod Washington, from whom he inherited Mount Vernon, and whose son, John Augustine Washington, 3d, turned it over to Richard Blackburn Washington in 1860. Another sister, Eleanor, also married a great-grandnephew of George Washington, and her brother, Lieut. John Sinclair Blackburn, was Aid on Gen. Payne's staff in the Civil War.

Moran's siblings were: Thomas (b. 1834), Eliza Sinclair (b. 1836), John Sinclair (b. 1838), Catherine Thomas (b. 1840), Ellen Thomas (b. 1844), Sarah Elizabeth (b. 1846), Mary Grace (b. 1849), Mary Watts (b. 1850), and Richard Scott (b. 1854).

Moran was educated in the classics by private tutors, supplemented by several years of travel abroad, investigating religious, racial and social conditions of various European countries and in the Far East. She was regarded as an authority on sociology.

== Career ==
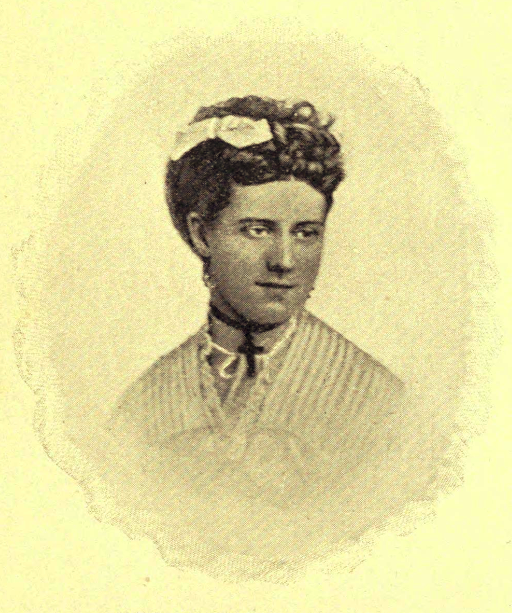
Jeannie Blackburn Moran

Moran was a charter member of the DAR, UDC, and the CDA. She was the founder and was regent of the first DAR chapter in Virginia (the Albemarle Chapter), as well as the founder of the Mount Vernon Chapter, in Alexandria, Virginia. She served as the Virginia State chair of the International Relations of Virginia DAR, and was a member of the Committee of International Relations of the National Society of the DAR. Moran was a member of the Colonial Dames of Virginia; a member of the descendants of the Colonial Cavaliers; and a charter member of the Colonial Dames Club of Washington. She belonged to the Jefferson Davis Chapter of the UDC.

She was a co-founder of the Washington Art Club, the Washington Opera Company, and the Congressional Country Club. She was a member of the Chevy Chase Club, League of American Pen Women, Virginia Society, Southern Society, New York Society, Philadelphia Society, and the Maryland Society.

She was a member of the Columbia Hospital Board. During World War I, Moran was selected by Eleanor Wilson McAdoo to be one of the nine chaperons for wounded soldiers of the Allies sent to Washington. Moran was also active in Red Cross work, as well as the sale and purchase of Liberty bonds. Following the signing of the armistice, Moran became vice-president and chair of international publicity of the peace movement based on church unity, as suggested by the Lambeth Conference in England, which appointed a cousin of Moran, Dr. Randolph H. McKim, D.D., of Washington, D.C. as Episcopal envoy to the Vatican.

She was a member of the Sulgrave Institution of New York, which aims to preserve Sulgrave Manor, the English ancestral home of the Washingtons; and in 1922, served as chair of the committee of Ambassadors and Ministers of nations which participated in the international ceremony of transplanting an oak and an elm from Sulgrave Manor in England to Mount Vernon, on which occasion she presided.

Governor Lee Trinkle appointed her Honorary Chair of the Yorktown Park Society, and Delegate to the Monroe Convention, held in Richmond, Virginia, 1923.

She was a founder of a sewing school for young African American women at Charlottesville, Virginia, which idea spread throughout the Episcopal churches of Virginia and proved an important contribution to the education of African American girls. Sissieretta Jones, a member of the sewing school, was aided by Moran to develop her talent as a singer.

Moran was the originator of the plan for the Mammy memorial to the "South's Black Mammy to be erected in Washington, D.C. on land donated by Congress. Later, she was co-instrumental in the selection of a memorial fountain to President Theodore Roosevelt that was to be erected in Washington, D.C.

Miss Washington, of Virginia

Moran was the author of numerous magazine and newspaper articles. Her first published work appears as a serial in The Baltimorcan, and was later dramatized under the title of Little Buttercup. Miss Washington of Virginia, centered about the romances of the Washington family. An edition de luxe of Miss Washington of Virginia was published at the expense of its author, and sold at the 1893 Chicago World's Fair, for the benefit of the Memorial Continental Hall of the DAR. The sum donated from these sales, made under the personal supervision of Miss Emma Floride Cunningham, the niece of Ann Pamela Cunningham, first regent of the Mount Vernon Ladies' Association, was the first offering towards the building fund of the Memorial Continental Hall. Other works by Moran included Twin Souls, which was pronounced by critics as a powerful message on the subject of Eugenics, and which was made into a film; Broken Idols; Children's Stories; Tom Dinkle's Visit to Santa Claus; Finding Aunt Nancy presented as a screenplay by Booth Tarkington; Nan Robbie; and Dog Rouser.

== Personal life ==
She married, at Spring Grove, on June 29, 1871, Francois (nickname, "Francis") Elois Berger Moran, son of Charles Moran, a New York banker. They had two children, Arabella Adams and Eleanor Berger.

Following her marriage, she resided in Comyn Hall, a Colonial mansion in Charlottesville, Virginia, built by her husband and named after the estate of his maternal ancestors in Wales.

Moran owned a mansion in Washington, D.C. at 2345 Massachusetts Avenue, on Sheridan Circle, a replica of Petit Trianon. Her salon was attended by diplomats and statesmen during several administrations. She encouraged talent by sponsoring theatricals on her private stage. A patron of the arts, she owned many rare antiques and paintings by European masters.

She later moved to 2150 Wyoming Avenue NW, Washington, D.C., where she died on November 13, 1929; interment was at Rock Creek Cemetery.

== Selected works ==
- Miss Washington, of Virginia. A semi-centennial love-story, 1893 (text)
- Little Buttercup
- Twin Souls, 1922 (text)
- Broken Idols
- Children's Stories
- Tom Dinkle's Visit to Santa Claus, 1921
- Finding Aunt Nancy
- Nan Robbie
- Dog Rouser
