= Wade H. Ellis =

American lawyer

Wade Hampton Ellis
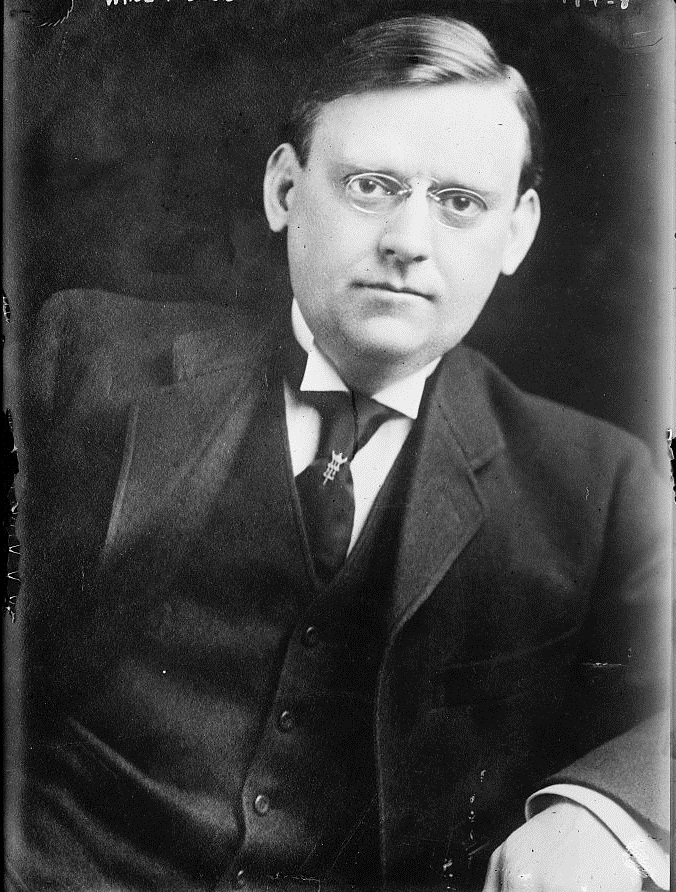

23rd Ohio Attorney General
- In office January 11, 1904 – November 6, 1908
- Governor: Myron T. Herrick; John M. Pattison
- Preceded by: John M. Sheets
- Succeeded by: Ulysses G. Denman

Personal details
- Born: December 31, 1866 Covington, Kentucky
- Died: July 5, 1948 (aged 81) Washington, D.C.
- Party: Republican
- Spouse: Dessie Corwin Chase
- Education: Washington and Lee University; Miami University of Ohio

Wade Hampton Ellis (December 31, 1866 – July 5, 1948) was a Republican politician in the U.S. state of Ohio who served as Ohio Attorney General (1904–1908), then Special Assistant to the Attorney General of the United States (1909–1911) and special counsel to the U.S. Department of Justice where he gained fame as a trust buster before resuming a private practice. The United States Supreme Court also appointed Ellis as special master in the case of Massachusetts v. New York. While splitting his time between Washington, D.C., and Cincinnati, Ohio, Ellis acquired and restored Rippon Lodge, which proved to be built by his ancestors and which a descendant placed on the National Register for Historic Places

== Early and family life ==
Wade H. Ellis was born at Covington, Kentucky on New Year's Eve to Katherine Blackburn Ellis and her husband Alexander Campbell Ellis.Though his mother's family he was descended from Richard Blackburn, who had emigrated from Ripon England in the early 18th century and built an estate he called Rippon Lodge in Prince William County in what was then the Virginia colony and became the state of Virginia in part because his son Thomas Blackburn and namesake grandson Richard Scott Blackburn fought as Patriots in the American Revolutionary War.

Young Wade Ellis attended public schools in Covington, then traveled across the Ohio River to attend Hughes High School and Chickering Institute in Cincinnati, Ohio. He then raveled to Virginia to attend Washington and Lee University in Lexington, where he studied law and received his bachelor's degree in 1889. He received a Doctorate in Law from Miami University of Ohio in 1904.

== Career ==
In 1890 Ellis was admitted to the Virginia state bar, and began to practice law, but moved to Cincinnati, Ohio to become a newspaperman. In 1894, Ellis became managing editor of the Cincinnati Tribune, which became the Commercial Tribune in 1896. He returned to practice of law in 1897.

In 1897, Ellis was appointed First Assistant Corporation Council of the city of Cincinnati, until January 1, 1903, when he resumed private practice. In the summer of 1903, the Republican State Convention nominated Ellis for Attorney General, and he won election that autumn. He won re-election in 1905. Elections were moved to even numbered years, with the next one scheduled for 1908. Ellis did not run, and resigned in November, 1908. Ulysses G. Denman was appointed to the office until his normal term would begin January, 1909.

In 1906, Governor Harris appointed a tax commission to investigate the tax laws of the state, and Ellis was elected chairman.

November 6, 1908, Ellis was appointed Assistant Attorney General of the United States by President Theodore Roosevelt. During the presidency of fellow Ohioan William Howard Taft, Ellis held several positions within the U.S.Department of Justice until resigning in 1911 shortly after the U.S. Supreme Court decided to break up Standard Oil, a case in whose investigation he had assisted indirectly. Ellis replaced Milton Purdy as "chief trust buster" under Attorney General George Wickersham. He drew considerable criticism in the 1910 election for holding the federal job as well as that of chairman of the Republican campaign in Ohio, which caused him to promise to resign, although he continued as special counsel with the Justice Department for several more months.

After his federal service, Ellis maintained a private legal practice in Washington D.C., with his brother Callen Blackburn Ellis and R. Golden Donaldson. for a number of years, then with Woodson P. Houghton, He worked on the minimum wage case, Adkins v. Children's Hospital (1923). In 1926 the United States Supreme Court named him special master in Massachusetts v. New York, which concerned the 1786 Treaty of Hartford and the boundary between the states. In 1930, he argued before the United States Supreme Court.

Always interested in history, Ellis visited northern Virginia estates, including Mount Vernon and Gunston Hall while he lived in Washington, D.C. He found Rippon Lodge in disrepair, bought it and made extensive alterations which transformed the structure into the Colonial Revival style. He also added detached buildings to the property, including three cabins, which were used by servants or guests, and three barns. His wife also oversaw revitalization of the grounds, which not only resulted in favorable publicity, but also made the estate a gathering place for meetings of the Daughters of the American Revolution, Garden Club of Virginia and benefit events for organizations including the Association for the Preservation of Virginia Antiquities, Archeological Society of Washington and a fraternity from George Washington University. The Blackburns also hosted dignitaries, ranging from former Presidents Woodrow Wilson and William Howard Taft (who had become Chief Justice) and Senator Robert Taft.

== Personal life ==
Ellis married Dessie Corwin Chase of Cincinnati in 1894. They had no children.

== Death and legacy ==
Ellis died at his home on Massachusetts Avenue in Washington D.C. Chief Justice Fred Vinson was one of the pallbearers at his funeral at the National City Christian Church. His widow decided to put Rippon Lodge for sale, in part after contact with Richard Blackburn Black, the grandson of Louise D.F. Hogue, who also was descended from Richard Blackburn. A descendant of Admiral Black would ultimately sell Rippon Lodge to Prince William County in 2000.

== See also ==
- Rippon Lodge – historic house Ellis owned and renovated in suburban Washington.

== Notes ==
Legal offices
Preceded by John M. Sheets	Ohio Attorney General; 1904 – 1908	Succeeded by Ulysses G. Denman
