= Belmont, Virginia =

- Census-designated place
- Location within Northern Virginia Location within Virginia Location within the United States
- Coordinates: 39°3′53″N 77°30′36″W
- Country: United States
- State: Virginia
- County: Loudoun

Area
  - Total: 2.73 sq mi (7.08 km^{2})
  - Land: 2.70 sq mi (7.00 km^{2})
  - Water: 0.031 sq mi (0.08 km^{2})
- Elevation: 295 ft (90 m)

Population (2010)
  - Total: 5,966
  - Density: 2,208/sq mi (852.4/km^{2})
- Time zone: UTC−5 (Eastern (EST))
  - Summer (DST): UTC−4 (EDT)
- ZIP code: 20147 (Ashburn)
- FIPS code: 51-06275
- GNIS feature ID: 2584805

Belmont is a census-designated place (CDP) in Loudoun County, Virginia, United States. As of the 2020 census, Belmont had a population of 10,268. It is 5 miles (8 km) southeast of Leesburg, the Loudoun county seat, and 31 miles (50 km) northwest of Washington, D.C. The Belmont Manor House, built between 1799 and 1802 by a son of Richard Henry Lee, is in the northeast part of the CDP and is now the clubhouse for a gated golf community.

The Belmont CDP is situated along the east side of Belmont Ridge Road (State Route 659) between State Route 7 and State Route 267 (the Dulles Toll Road). The CDP extends north to VA 7 and south to include Middlebury Street and the Washington and Old Dominion Trail, while to the east it is bordered by Stubble Road, Claiborne Parkway, and Ashburn Road. Two major subdivisions make up Belmont: Belmont Country Club in the east is the larger of the two, and Belmont Greene, in the west, is the smaller.

According to the U.S. Census Bureau, the Belmont CDP has a total area of 2.7 square miles (7.1 km^{2}), of which 0.03 square miles (0.08 km^{2}), or 1.20%, are water. The area drains mainly east via several streams toward Broad Run, a north-flowing tributary of the Potomac River, while the westernmost part of the CDP drains west to Goose Creek, which also flows north to the Potomac.

== Demographics ==
Historical population
Census	Pop.	Note	%±
2010	5,966		—
2020	10,268		72.1%
U.S. Decennial Census; 2010 2020

=== 2020 census ===
As of the 2020 census, Belmont had a population of 10,268. The median age was 38.9 years. 30.2% of residents were under the age of 18 and 7.7% of residents were 65 years of age or older. For every 100 females there were 92.4 males, and for every 100 females age 18 and over there were 91.0 males age 18 and over.

100.0% of residents lived in urban areas, while 0.0% lived in rural areas.

There were 3,201 households in Belmont, of which 51.3% had children under the age of 18 living in them. Of all households, 72.8% were married-couple households, 9.4% were households with a male householder and no spouse or partner present, and 15.2% were households with a female householder and no spouse or partner present. About 13.7% of all households were made up of individuals and 3.8% had someone living alone who was 65 years of age or older.

There were 3,296 housing units, of which 2.9% were vacant. The homeowner vacancy rate was 1.8% and the rental vacancy rate was 2.5%.

Racial composition as of the 2020 census
Race	Number	Percent
White	6,058	59.0%
Black or African American	580	5.6%
American Indian and Alaska Native	25	0.2%
Asian	2,443	23.8%
Native Hawaiian and Other Pacific Islander	5	0.0%
Some other race	203	2.0%
Two or more races	954	9.3%
Hispanic or Latino (of any race)	747	7.3%

=== 2010 census ===
Belmont was first listed as a census designated place in the 2010 U.S. census.
