= Thomas Jesse Lee =

American planter and lawyer

34th and 38th Sheriff of Prince William County
- In office 1803–1804
- Preceded by: John Linton
- Succeeded by: William Downman
- In office 1798–1801
- Preceded by: John Brown
- Succeeded by: Henry Washington

Personal details
- Born: October 20, 1758 Westmoreland County, Colony of Virginia, British America
- Died: September 7, 1805 (aged 46) Virginia, U.S.
- Resting place: Park Gate; Nokesville, Virginia, U.S.
- Spouse(s): Susannah Brent (m. 1783; died 1785) Mildred Washington (m. 1788; died 1796)
- Relations: Ludwell Lee (brother); Francis Lightfoot Lee (uncle); Thomas Lee (grandfather); Hannah Harrison Ludwell Lee (grandmother)
- Children: 1
- Parent(s): Richard Henry Lee; Anne Aylett
- Education: St Bees School
- Occupation: Planter, lawyer, politician

Thomas Jesse Lee (October 20, 1758 – September 7, 1805) was an American lawyer, planter, and politician. He served as the 34th and 38th Sheriff of Prince William County. He was a descendant of the Lee Family of Virginia.

== Early life and education ==
Thomas Jesse Lee was born on October 20, 1758 at his family's Chantilly plantation. He was the first son born to the former Anne Aylett (1738-1768), the first wife of prominent patriot, politician and planter Richard Henry Lee. His Lee ancestors had founded one of the First Families of Virginia, as well as speculated in land further up the Potomac River. His grandfather Thomas Lee (1690-1750) had considerable acreage in what became Prince William, Fairfax and Loudoun counties. Lee was the great-grandson of Col. Richard Lee II and a great-great-grandson of Col. Richard Lee I.

Lee received a private education. After his mother's death and father's remarriage, Lee and his brother Ludwell Lee were sent to London, England, where their merchant uncle William Lee lived with his wife and young children. The Lee brothers first studied at St Bees School in Lancashire, then Lee studied law and business. Lee left his studies in England early as a result of the rising tensions which led to the American Revolutionary War.

== Career ==
Lee worked as a lawyer in the Dumfries, Virginia area in Prince William County, and lived on the 7,500 acre Park Gate estate in present-day Nokesville from 1790 until 1805.

Lee served as the sheriff of Prince William County for two non-consecutive terms in 1798 and 1803, and also served as special attorney for the Commonwealth of Virginia.

== Personal life ==
In 1783, Lee married Susannah Brent and they had one daughter in 1873. Susannah died in 1785. In October 1788, Lee later married Mildred Washington, a daughter of John Augustine Washington and niece of George Washington. President Washington visited Lee and his wife at their Park Gate estate as referenced in his diaries.

Lee continued to practice estate law until his death, and was a business partner with his son-in-law Gerard Alexander.

== Death and legacy ==
Lee died on September 7, 1805 at the residence of his younger brother Ludwell. He is referenced in the papers of George Washington and the papers of Bushrod Washington, his brother in law.
