= Park Gate (Nokesville, Virginia) =

Historic house in Virginia, United States

- U.S. National Register of Historic Places
- Virginia Landmarks Register
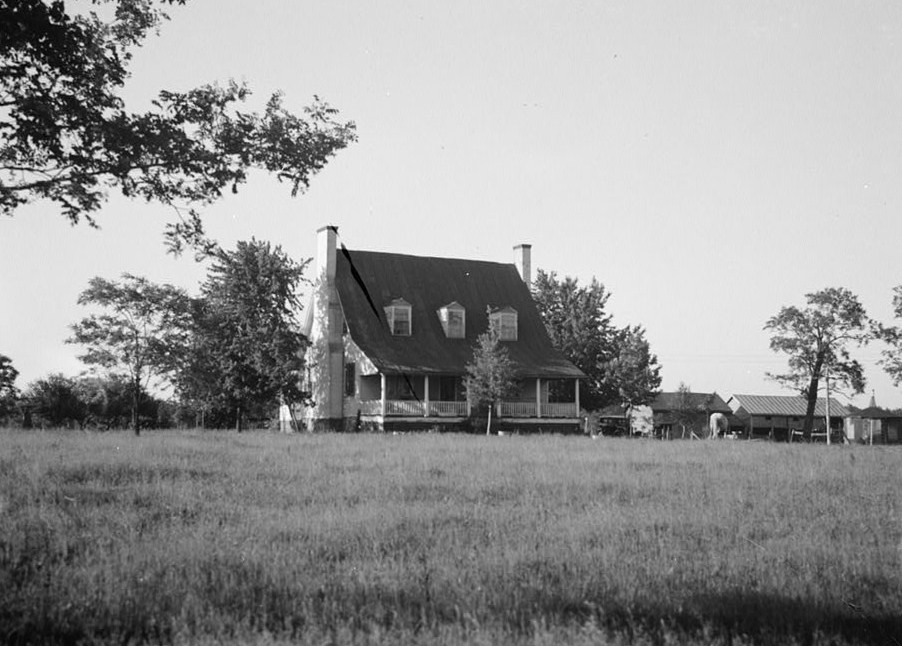
- Park Gate, HABS Photo

- Location within Northern Virginia Location within Virginia Location within the United States
- Location: 11508 Park Gate Dr., near Nokesville, Virginia
- Coordinates: 38°40′44″N 77°32′53″W
- Area: 2.7 acres (1.1 ha)
- Built: c. 1750
- Architectural style: Tidewater Style
- NRHP reference No.: 87000580
- VLR No.: 076-0018

Significant dates
- Added to NRHP: April 3, 1987
- Designated VLR: September 20, 1988

Park Gate is a historic home located near Nokesville, Prince William County, Virginia. It was built about 1750, and is a 1 1/2-story, three-bay, Tidewater Style frame dwelling. It has a steep gable roof and exterior end chimneys and measures 36 feet by 30 feet. The front facade features a 12-foot-deep (3.7 m) full-width front porch. Colonel Thomas Lee, eldest son of Richard Henry Lee, signer of the Declaration of Independence, resided at Park Gate from about 1790 to 1805.

It was added to the National Register of Historic Places in 1987.
