= Attorney General Denman =

Attorney General Denman may refer to:

- Thomas Denman, 1st Baron Denman (1779–1854), Attorney General for England and Wales
- Ulysses G. Denman (1866–1961), Attorney General of Ohio
