= Belmont Manor House =

Historic house in Virginia, United States

- Belmont
- U.S. National Register of Historic Places
- Virginia Landmarks Register
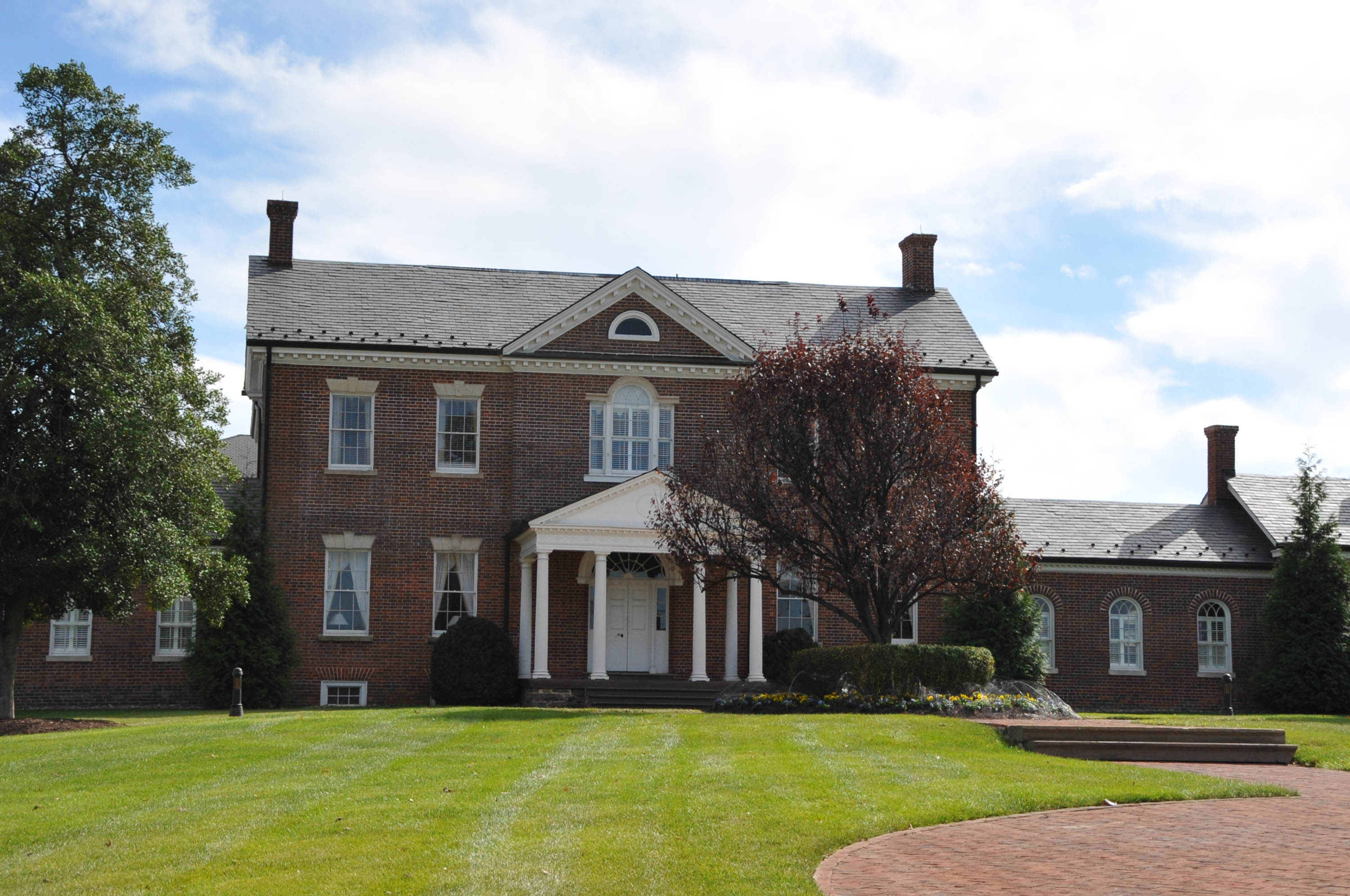

- Location within Northern Virginia Location within Virginia Location within the United States
- Nearest city: Ashburn, Virginia
- Coordinates: 39°04′9.81″N 77°29′28.83″W
- Built: 1799
- Architectural style: Federal
- NRHP reference No.: 80004198
- VLR No.: 053-0106

Significant dates
- Added to NRHP: February 8, 1980
- Designated VLR: September 21, 1976

Belmont Manor House, formally known as Belmont Plantation, is a two-story, five-part Federal mansion in Loudoun County, Virginia, United States, built between the years of 1799–1802 by Ludwell Lee (1760–1836), son of Richard Henry Lee. The land surrounding the mansion, the Belmont property, was handed down to his first wife (also his first cousin), Flora Lee, from their grandfather, Thomas Lee.

Located in the Belmont census-designated place, the Belmont Manor House and property have been owned since 1995 by Toll Brothers, Inc. It uses the Manor House as the clubhouse in a gated golf community. The property and house are listed in the National Register of Historic Places.

== History ==
The plantation has been visited by many notable figures in history including President James Madison in 1812. The President was said to use the plantation as a safe haven throughout the War of 1812 after the British attacked Washington, D.C. Another figure who visited the plantation was General and diplomat La Fayette, who came to the Manor home to visit Ludwell Lee in 1825.

The manor home is located at the highest point in eastern Loudoun County, with views of the surrounding hills and mountain ranges of the approaches to the nearby town of Leesburg, Virginia and the Blue Ridge Mountains.

In 1836, Margaret Mercer purchased the Belmont home from Lee's heirs; she intended to adapt it as a women's Christian school. After her death, the estate was sold to prominent Alexandria slave trader George Kephart, whose daughter also operated a school (though soon moved to a different location and which closed after Virginia adopted free public education in its post-Civil War constitution. In 1887, the home was bought by Frederick P. Stanton, a governor of Kansas, who sold it in 1907 to John Scott Ferguson, a Pittsburgh attorney and cousin of Evelyn Nesbit Thaw. In 1915, Ferguson sold it to the McLean family. The McLean family is notable for having once owned the Hope Diamond.

In 1915, Edward B. McLean, son of the publisher of The Washington Post acquired the property and built a horse stable and training track for Thoroughbreds. McLean dispersed his bloodstock in June 1931 and in December the estate was sold to Patrick J. Hurley and his wife. Hurley is notable as the Secretary of War under President Herbert Hoover. In 1963, the IBM Corporation bought the property and adapted it as their management retreat center. By the 1980s, the house had fallen into disrepair and required renovation, with extensive damage to the inside.

In 1995, Toll Brothers, Inc. purchased the property to build a golf community gated community around it, while using the renovated manor home as a clubhouse. It received an extensive addition to incorporate restaurants and the club house, all within the overall architectural theme and style of the original home. Within the original home, despite the damage sustained from neglect, various bas relief artworks and plasterwork remained in place.

In November 2019, ClubCorp, a leading owner-operator of private golf and country clubs and stadium clubs in North America, acquired Belmont Country Club from Toll Golf along with six other premier lifestyle golf clubs on the East Coast.

== Appearance ==
The Belmont Manor house sits on the peak of the plantation property and one of the highest points in eastern Loudoun County. It has many panoramic views of the countryside and the Blue Ridge Mountains. This house was traditionally home to a "rich equestrian tradition"—steeplechase racing, and fox hunting.

The main entrance is encased with a portico with two Doric columns on either side, elaborate and decorative detail throughout. The first floor consists of a large center hall, the foyer, which is encased on either side by two large reception rooms that are all decorated with paneled wainscoting. The reception rooms on the East and West side both have their own fireplace with mantels that said to be gifts to Lafayette in 1825. The stairway is an ornamental structure in the center hall section that has a "molded handrail and thin, square balusters, three to a step." On the second floor, there are bedrooms with ornamental federal style woodwork, along with a fancy bath. The house has been restored to its appearance in the beginning of the 19th century. It was remodeled once in 1907.

The only outbuilding of the Manor house that is still standing today is a small, stone smokehouse. A cemetery is located on the west side of the manor house and holds the grave of Ludwell Lee. The slave cemetery is nearby.

== See also ==
- African American Burial Ground
