= Leedstown Resolutions =

Resolutions against the British Stamp Act

On February 27, 1766, ten years before the American Declaration of Independence was published, a declaration was made in Leedstown, in what is now the U.S. state of Virginia, known as the Leedstown Resolutions, also known as the Leedstown Resolves, Westmoreland Resolves, Westmoreland Association, and the Northern Neck Declaration. The resolutions were against enforcement of the British Stamp Act 1765.

A plaque commemorating the declaration in Oak Grove, Westmoreland County, Virginia reads:

At Leedstown, Westmoreland County, Virginia Colony, an association was formed to resist the enforcement of the British Stamp Act, February 27, 1766. The resolutions, drafted by the Revolutionary leader, Richard Henry Lee, were one of the first protests against the Stamp Act and influenced public opinion in all the American colonies.

== Resolutions text ==
The Leedstown Resolutions, February 27, 1766:

Roused by danger and alarmed at attempts, foreign and domestic, to reduce the people of this country to a state of abject and detestable slavery by destroying that free and happy condition of government under which they have hitherto lived, We, who subscribe this paper, have associated and do bind ourselves to each other, to God, and to our country, by the firmest ties that religion and virtue can frame, most sacredly and punctually to stand by and with our lives and fortunes, to support, maintain, and defend each other in the observance and execution of these following articles –

FIRST: We declare all due allegiance and obedience to our lawful Sovereign, George the Third, King of Great Britain. And we determine to the utmost of our power to preserve the laws, the peace and good order of this Colony, as far as is consistent with the preservation of our Constitutional rights and liberty,

SECONDLY: As we know it to be the Birthright privilege of every British subject (and of the people of Virginia as being such) founded on Reason, Law, and Compact; that he cannot be legally tried, but by his peers; that he cannot be taxed, but by consent of a Parliament, in which he is represented by persons chosen by the people, and who themselves pay a part of the tax they impose on others. If, therefore, any person or persons shall attempt, by any action, or proceeding, to deprive this Colony of these fundamental rights, we will immediately regard him or them, as the most dangerous enemy of the community; and we will go to any extremity, not only to prevent the success of such attempts, but to stigmatize and punish the offender.

THIRDLY: As the Stamp Act does absolutely direct the property of the people to be taken from them without their consent expressed by their representatives and as in many cases it deprives the British American Subject of his right to trial by jury; we do determine, at every hazard, and paying no regard to danger or to death, we will exert every faculty, to prevent the execution of the said Stamp Act in any instance whatsoever within this Colony. And every abandoned wretch, who shall be so lost to virtue and public good, as wickedly to contribute to the introduction or fixture of the Stamp Act in this Colony, by using stampt paper, or by any other means, we will, with the utmost expedition, convince all such profligates that immediate danger and disgrace shall attend their prostitute purposes.

FOURTHLY: That the last article may most surely and effectually be executed, we engage to each other, that whenever it shall be known to any of this association, that any person is so conducting himself as to favor the introduction of the Stamp Act, that immediate notice shall be given to as many of the association as possible; and that every individual so informed, shall, with expedition, repair to a place of meeting to be appointed as near the scene of action as may be.

FIFTHLY: Each associator shall do his true endeavor to obtain as many signers to this association, as he possibly can.

SIXTHLY: If any attempt shall be made on the liberty or property of any associator for any action or thing to be done in consequence of this agreement, we do most solemnly bind ourselves by the sacred engagements above entered into, at the risk of our lives and fortunes, to restore such associate to his liberty and to protect him in the enjoyment of his property.

In testimony of the good faith with which we resolve to execute this association we have this 27th day of February 1766 in Virginia, put our hands and seals hereto.

[Signed]

Richard Henry Lee * Will. Robinson * Lewis Willis * Thos. Lud. Lee * Saml. Washington * Chas. Washington * Moore Fauntleroy * Francis Lightfoot Lee * Thomas Jones * Rodham Kenner * Spencer M. Ball * Richard Mitchell * Joseph Murdock * Richd. Parker * Spence Monroe * John Watts * Robt. Lovell * John Blagge * Charles Weeks * Willm. Booth * Geo. Turbeville * Alvin Moxley * Wm. Flood * John Ballatine, Jr. * William Lee * Thos. Chilton * Richard Buckner * Jos. Pierce * Will. Chilton * John Williams * William Sydnor * John Monroe * William Cocke * Willm. Grayson * Wm. Brockenbrough * Saml. Selden * Richd. Lee * Daniel Tebbs * Francis Thornton, Jr. * Peter Rust * John Lee Jr. * Francis Waring * John Upshau * Meriwether Smith * Thos. Roane * Jas. Edmondson * Jas. Webb. Jr. * John Edmondson * Jas. Banks * Smith Young * Laur. Washington * W . Roane * Richd. Hodges * Jas. Upshau * Jas. Booker * A . Montague * Richd. Jeffries * John Suggett * John S. Woodcock * Robt. Wormeley Carter * John Blackwell * Winder S. Kenner * Wm. Bronaugh * Wm. Peirce * John Berryman * John Dickson * John Browne * Edwd. Sanford * Charles Chilton * Edward Sanford * Jos. Lane * John Beale, Jr. * John Newton * Will. Beale, Jr. * Chs. Mortimer * Wm. Pierce * John Berryman * John Dickson * John Broone * Edwd, Sanford * Charles Chilton * Edward Sanford * Daniel McCarty * Jer. Rush * Edwd. Ransdell * Townshend Dade * John Ashton * W .Brent * Francis Foushee * John Smith, Jr. * Wm. Ball * Thos. Barnes * Jos. Blackwell * Reuben Meriwether * Edw. Mountjoy * Wm. J. Mountjoy * Thos. Mountjoy * Gilbt. Campbell * John Edmondsen, Jr. * Charles Beale * Peter Grant * Thompson Mason * Jona. Beckwith * Jas. Samford * John Belfield * W . Smith * John Augt. Washington * Thos. Belfield * Edgcomb Suggett * Henry Francks * John Bland, Jr. * Jas. Emerson * Thos. Logan * Jo. Milliken * Ebenezer Fisher * Hancock Eustace * John Richards * Thos. Jett * Thos. Douglas * Max Robinson * John Orr
