= Bailey Washington =

American politician

Member of the Virginia House of Delegates from Stafford County
- In office May 1, 1780 – May 6, 1781 Serving with William Fitzhugh
- Preceded by: James Garrard
- Succeeded by: (seat removed)

Personal details
- Born: September 10, 1731 Chotank Creek district, Stafford, Virginia
- Died: June 22, 1807 (aged 75) Overwharton Parish Stafford County, Virginia, United States
- Spouse: Catherine Storke
- Children: Henry, William, Bailey Jr., Elizabeth, Mary

Bailey Washington (September 10, 1731 – June 11, 1807) was an American planter and legislator who served one term as a delegate from Stafford County in the Virginia House of Delegates and many years as local justice of the peace.

== Early and family life ==
A second cousin of George Washington, Bailey Washington was the fourth and final son born to Henry Washington (1694–1748) and his wife Mary Butler. His name partly honors his grandmother Ann Baynham's third husband, Joseph Bailey, who died childless but named his step-granddaughter Mary Butler one of his heirs; Ann Baynham Butler Webster Bailey would also name this child in her will. His father, although born in Westmoreland County, moved to Stafford County as a young man and became a planter, as well as one of the local justices (handling administrative as well as judicial matters) in 1731 and 1745 and the Stafford County sheriff in 1737. However, he died when Bailey was a boy. His elder brothers were Henry Washington II (1721–1745), Nathaniel Washington (1726–1745) and John Washington (1730–1782; sometimes called "John Washington of Hilton" after his farm); he also had a sister Mary Washington (1728–1748).

Bailey Washington married in 1749 (when he was 17 years old) to Catherine Storke (1723–1804), the daughter of William Storke (1690–1726) and the former Elizabeth Hart (1695–1760) of then vast St. Paul's parish. They had sons Henry Washington (1749–1825), who would serve in the House of Delegates representing Prince William County before financial troubles prompted moves to Jefferson County, Kentucky and eventually what became Limestone County, Alabama), William Washington (1752-1810; a war hero), Bailey Jr. (1753-1814; who also represented Stafford County), and John Washington (b.1756 and presumed not to have reached adulthood), and daughters Elizabeth Washington Storke (1758-c. 1798) and Mary Butler Washington Peyton (1760–1822).

== Career ==
When he reached legal age, Bailey Washington gained control of land near Aquia which he inherited from his father (in part because most of his elder brothers died young), and where he eventually moved after building a home he called "Windsor Forest" there in Overwharton Parish. Bailey Washington had initially farmed in the Chotank District (part of St. Paul's Parish, which became part of King George County when Stafford County was reorganized). He expanded his landholdings to c. 1,200 acres (4.9 km^{2}) by the time of the American Revolutionary War, operating his farms by using enslaved laborers. In the 1787 Virginia tax census, he and his son Bailey Washington Jr. owned slaves in Stafford County. In 1803 he paid taxes for 25 enslaved adults and 3 slaves between 12 and 16 years old, plus 14 horses in 1803 In 1807 he paid taxes for 20 enslaved adults and 2 slaves between 12 and 16 years old, plus 10 horses

Bailey Washington served as one of the Stafford County justices of the peace (who also administered the county) from 1754 until at least 1779. Although one index of the Virginia House of Delegates indicates this man won election to that body in 1780 and served one term, another source believes that only his sons Henry and Bailey Washington Jr. served in the state legislature.

== Death and legacy ==
Bailey Washington survived his wife and many of his children. Although some older sources list his death in 1803, property tax records support the now accepted death date of June 22, 1807. Although one source found he gave the 500 acre Windsor Forest plantation to his son Bailey Washington Jr in 1784, the same source indicates his youngest daughter, Mary, who had married Dr. Valentine Peyton and lived at his "Tusculum" estate in Stafford County, inherited Windsor Forest. In 1846, Jefferson Spindle, who would become a Stafford County magistrate, purchased Windsor Forest from Charles Prosser Moncure, and operated a school for several years before the American Civil War. The long-vanished Stafford County estate is now memorialized as a real estate subdivision name, although the land itself is within the Quantico Marine Corps reservation.
