= African American Burial Ground =

Historic African American cemetery in Virginia

Coordinates: 39.0788°N 77.4994°W

The African American Burial Ground is a historic cemetery for the enslaved, located in Ashburn, Virginia, off Leesburg Pike (Virginia State Route 7) in Loudoun County, Virginia. Most of the enslaved buried there were from nearby Belmont Plantation.

The abandoned site was rediscovered in 2015 by Rev. Michelle Thomas. Rev. Thomas was the president of the local NAACP chapter in 2019. That year, Governor Ralph Northam appointed her to the Commission on African American History Education in the Commonwealth.

In 2017, the real estate developer Toll Brothers, which owned the land, donated 2.75 acres (1.11 ha) to a new Loudoun Freedom Center. In 2021, the developer agreed to donate an additional 4 acres (1.6 ha), which will be used to re-create a schoolhouse and other structures used by enslaved people.

Also planned are a columbarium and a scatter garden, where people can scatter ashes of their loved ones. In 2020 Michelle Thomas buried the first free Black person in the cemetery: her 16-year-old son, dead of drowning.
