= Bailey Washington Jr. =

American politician

Member of the Virginia House of Delegates from Stafford County
- In office May 3, 1784 – October 16, 1785 Serving with William Brent
- Preceded by: Charles Carter
- Succeeded by: William Garrard
- In office October 15, 1787 – June 23, 1788 Serving with William Fitzhugh
- Preceded by: Andrew Buchannan
- Succeeded by: Andrew Buchannan

Personal details
- Born: December 12, 1753 Windsor Forest, Stafford, Virginia
- Died: June 14, 1814 (aged 60) Windsor Forest, Stafford County, Virginia, United States
- Spouse: Euphan Curle Wallace
- Relatives: Bailey Washington (father), Henry Washington (brother)

Bailey Washington Jr. (December 12, 1753 – June 14, 1814) was an American planter and legislator who served two terms as a delegate from Stafford County in the Virginia House of Delegates and many years as local justice of the peace.

== Early and family life ==
Bailey Washington Jr. was the third son born to Bailey Washington Sr. and his wife, the former Catherine Storke. His father also served in the Virginia House of Delegates, as well as operated plantations using enslaved labor. His elder brothers Henry Washington (1749–1825), also served in the House of Delegates representing Prince William County but financial troubles prompted moves to Shelbyville, Kentucky and eventually what became Limestone County, Alabama) and William Washington (1752–1810; a war hero who also served in the Virginia General Assembly), although John Washington (b. 1756 probably died as a child). His sisters Elizabeth Washington Storke (1758–c. 1798) and Mary Butler Washington Peyton (1760–1822) married local planters.

== Career ==
Bailey Washington farmed using enslaved labor. In the 1810 federal census, he owned 45 enslaved people. Stafford County voters twice elected him to the Virginia House of Delegates, although one source believes that he not his father also served in 1780.

== Death and legacy ==
Bailey Washington was survived by his wife Euphan Curle Wallace (1764–1845), the step daughter of Thomson Mason. Although he received Windsor Farms from his father in 1784, it was held by his youngest sister, Mary, who had married Dr. Valentine Peyton and lived at his "Tusculum" estate in Stafford County, not long after their father's death. In 1846, Jefferson Spindle (who became a Stafford magistrate like this man's father) purchased Windsor Forest from Charles Prosser Moncure, and operated a school there for several years before the American Civil War. The long-vanished Stafford County estate (now within Quantico Marine Corps reservation) is now memorialized as a real estate subdivision name.
