= Ludwell Lee =

American politician

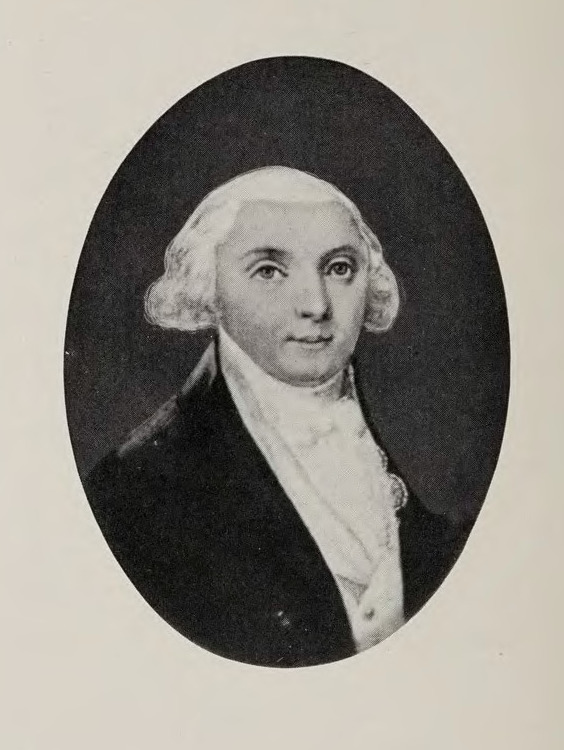

Speaker of the Virginia Senate
- In office 1794–1796
- Preceded by: John James Maund
- Succeeded by: Alexander Stuart

Member of the Virginia Senate representing Prince William and Fairfax Counties
- In office October 1, 1792 – November 30, 1800
- Preceded by: John Pope
- Succeeded by: Thomson Mason

Member of the Virginia House of Delegates representing Fairfax County
- In office October 19, 1789 – October 16, 1791 Serving with Roger West, Nicholas Fitzhugh
- Preceded by: David Stuart
- Succeeded by: Roger West

Member of the Virginia House of Delegates representing Prince William County
- In office October 15, 1787 – June 22, 1788 Serving with Cuthbert Bullitt
- Preceded by: Daniel Carroll Brent
- Succeeded by: William Grayson

Personal details
- Born: October 13, 1760 Chantilly plantation, Westmoreland County, Colony of Virginia
- Died: March 23, 1836 (aged 75) Belmont Manor House, Loudoun County, Virginia
- Resting place: Belmont Manor House, Loudoun County, Virginia
- Spouse(s): Flora Lee, Elizabeth Armistead
- Parent(s): Richard Henry Lee and Anne Aylett
- Education: Middle Temple, London
- Occupation: planter, lawyer

Ludwell Lee (October 13, 1760 – March 23, 1836) was an American lawyer and planter who served in both houses of the Virginia General Assembly representing Prince William and Fairfax Counties and rose to become the Speaker of the Virginia Senate. Beginning in 1799, following the death of his first wife, Lee built Belmont Manor, a plantation house in Loudoun County, Virginia (created from Fairfax and Prince William Counties in 1757, his uncle Francis Lightfoot Lee having served as that county's first Burgess alongside James Hamilton), which today is on the National Register of Historic Places.

== Early and family life ==
Ludwell Lee was the second son born to the former Anne Aylett (1738-1768), the first wife of prominent patriot, politician and planter Richard Henry Lee. His Lee ancestors had founded one of the First Families of Virginia, as well as speculated in land further up the Potomac River. His grandfather Thomas Lee (1690-1750) had considerable acreage in what was or became Prince William, Fairfax and Loudoun counties before Ludwell was born. Like his elder brother, Thomas Jesse Lee (1758-1805), Ludwell Lee received a private education locally suitable to his class. However, their mother died after giving birth to three more daughters, Mary and Hannah (who would both marry members of the Washington family), and Marybelle (who did not reach adulthood). Their father remarried, to the former Anne Gaskins (1745-1796), who gave birth to another three daughters before bearing Francis Lightfoot Lee (1782-1850). Meanwhile, these two elder brothers were sent to London, England, where their merchant uncle William Lee lived with his wife and decade younger children. The Lee brothers first studied first at St. Bee's School in Lancastershire (their father reasoning that the annual tuition would be about a third of that charged by an American school), then their father decided that while Thomas should learn business with his uncle William orat Schweighhauser's countinghouse, Ludwell should study at the Middle Temple to become a lawyer. Tensions between the American colonies and the mother country were rising, which prompted Thomas Lee to return home early, but Ludwell Lee wanted to finish his five-year course of study, so defended his father's signing the Declaration of Independence, although his teacher and some schoolmates thought it treasonous.

Upon returning to Virginia, Ludwell Lee spent time at Williamsburg studying under the guidance of Professor George Wythe.

During what would be the final months of the American Revolutionary War, Ludlow Lee volunteered for military service in Westmoreland County, in a troop of dragoons recruited from among the First Families of Virginia for the Virginia Line by Col. John Francis Mercer. Lee and schoolmate and soon-to-be brother-in-law Bushrod Washington scouted as the company harassed British Banastre Tarleton, who was raiding Southern plantations as far away as Albemarle County. The company also saw action at the Battle of Green Spring (at his cousin William Lee's plantation outside Williamsburg. Ludwell Lee at some point became an aide-de-camp to the Marquis de Lafayette) and sometime during or after the war received the rank of colonel.

In 1788, he married his cousin, Flora Lee (1770-1795, who also was descended from their common grandfather Thomas Lee, her father being Col. Philip Ludwell Lee). They had a daughter (Eliza) and a son (Rev. Richard Henry Lee 1794-1865) who survived their parents. Ludwell Lee's father died in 1794, burdened by debts such that two auctions were made of his property, and his namesake grandson would publish two volumes of his grandfather's memoirs to rescue his name and honor.

Ludwell Lee's second wife was Elizabeth Armistead and they had six children.

== Career ==
Ludwell Lee was admitted to the Virginia bar in Fairfax County on September 21, 1784 and was a gentleman justice of the peace by 1797. He practiced as an attorney in northern Virginia, as well as farmed using enslaved labor.

During his marriage to his cousin Flora), Lee lived on Duke Street in Alexandria, Virginia and by 1790 acquired a mansion on "Shooters Hill" (a/k/a "Shuter's hill"), a bluff above the city, property that he sold to Benjamin Dulany in 1799 and which burned down on February 7, 1842. In 1787 he helped found the town of Newport in Prince William County, as did fellow planters Francis Peyton, William Bronaugh, William Heale, John Peyton Harrison, Burr Powell, Josias Clapham and Richard Bland Lee. Ludwell Lee was also a trustee for some of his cousins, since his uncle Henry Lee had married Flora's sister Matilda, then engaged in a number of questionable transactions with lands his wife had inherited from their father before fleeing the country (and dying in abroad), so she made a trust to protect that inheritance for her and their children.

Voters in Prince William County elected him as a delegate, and later Lee won election as a delegate from Fairfax County. A determined Federalist, Lee concluded his legislative service with several terms as state senator representing Fairfax and Prince William Counties. George Mason's son Thomson Mason succeeded him in the state senate, but failed to win re-election four years later.

Upon moving to Loudoun County in 1800, Ludwell Lee ended his political career rather than challenge multi-term delegates William Noland and Joseph Lewis, or longtime senator Francis Peyton. He concentrated on operating his plantations (using enslaved labor) and providing for his children and grandchildren. He freed Henrietta and her two children in 1801.

Lee won prizes for his sheep in 1806. In the 1810 census, Lee owned 69 enslaved persons. In the 1820 census, he owned 44 slaves, of whom 25 were engaged in agriculture. In the final census of his life, Lee owned 24 slaves, and like in the previous census, his wife did not live on the plantation.

Lee was a member of the Loudoun Auxiliary of the American Colonization Society, as were nearby large slaveholders Burr Powell, George Carter, William Noland, Charles Ball, William Ellzey and Asa Moore, as well as Quakers Israel Janney, Yardley Taylor and Mahlon Taylor.

During the Marquis de Layfayette's American tour, the General visited Lee as his third stop in Loudoun County after he and president John Quincy Adams visited ex-President James Monroe at "Oak Hill", then were received by about 10,000 people including six militia companies at Leesburg, before Lafayette continued on to visit ex-Presidents Madison at "Montpelier" and Jefferson at "Monticello".

In one of his last transactions, in 1825, Lee sold an island in the Potomac River near its conjunction with Broad Run to his cousin Wilson Cary V. Seldon, who built a house and for whom the island would later be named.

== Death and legacy ==
Lee died in 1836, survived by his second wife, who with the assent of his children, sold Belmont Manor to Margaret Mercer, a dedicated member of the American Colonization Society who had worked as a teacher in order to pay her father's debts, free the slaves she had inherited, and send them to Africa a decade earlier. She operated a school for girls at Belmont, and tried to use the plantation to demonstrate that farming could be successful without enslaved labor, although after her death her executors sold the property to Alexandria's largest slave trader. Lee was buried at Belmont, as was his widow in 1850. By that time, his son Richard Henry Lee, who had become a lawyer, was a professor of languages and belle letres at Washington College in Washington, Pennsylvania. He would soon begin studying theology and became an Episcopal priest. His two eldest sons (Richard Henry Lee and Philip Ludwell Lee became U.S. Cavalry captains during the American Civil War).

Belmont Manor, which he constructed beginning in 1799, remains today, and is on the National Register for Historic Places.
