= Chantilly (Montross, Virginia) =

Archaeological site in Virginia, United States

- U.S. National Register of Historic Places
- Virginia Landmarks Register
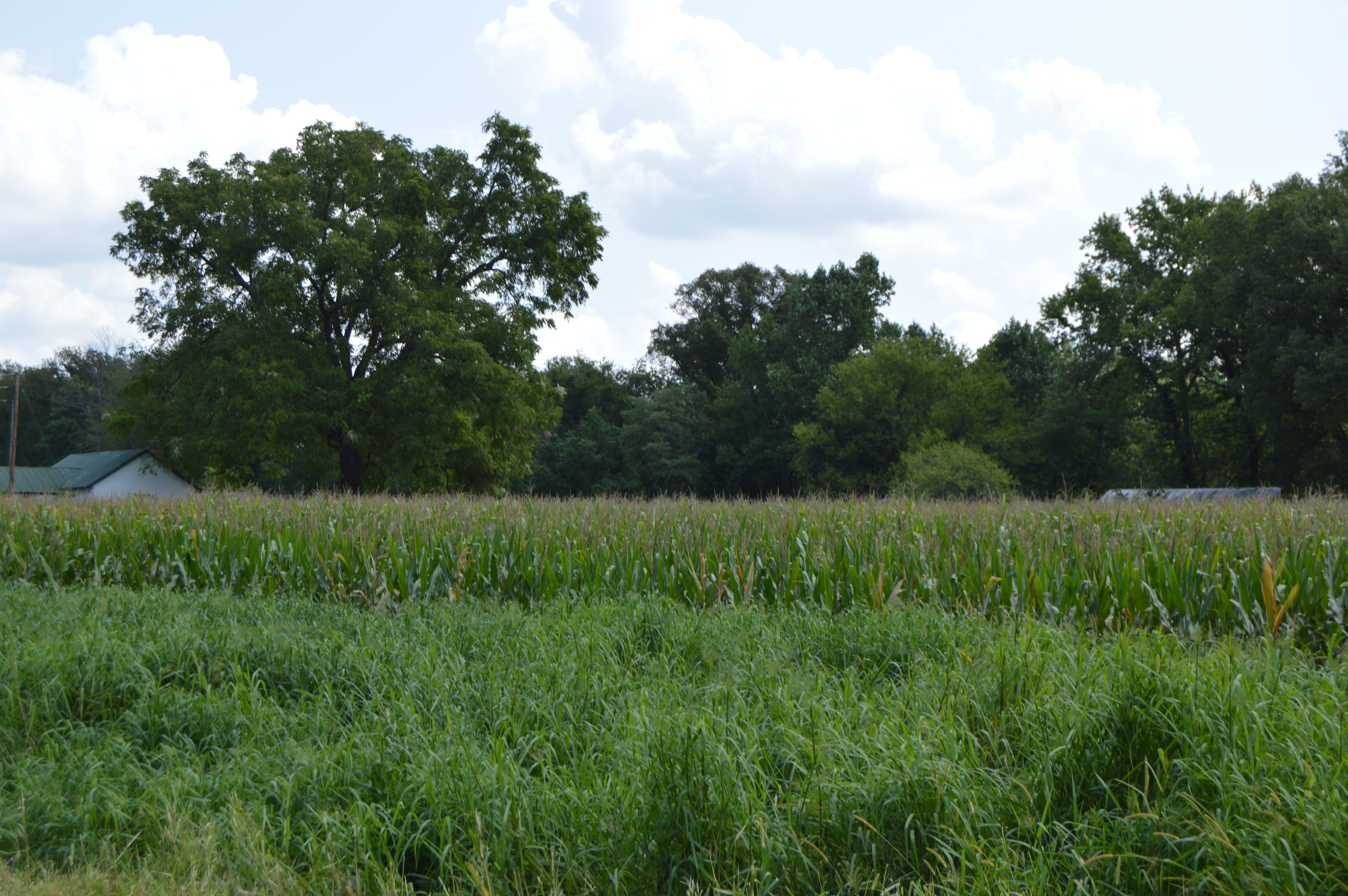
- Fields on the western end of the estate property
- Nearest city: Montross, Virginia
- Area: 90 acres (36 ha)
- Built: 1763
- NRHP reference No.: 71000990
- VLR No.: 096-0005

Significant dates
- Added to NRHP: December 16, 1971
- Designated VLR: October 6, 1970

Chantilly is a historic archaeological site located near Montross, Westmoreland County, Virginia. The site was the home of U.S. Founding Father Richard Henry Lee (1732-1794) in his later years.

It was listed on the National Register of Historic Places in 1971.

== See also ==
- Stratford Hall
