= John M. Sheets =

American lawyer

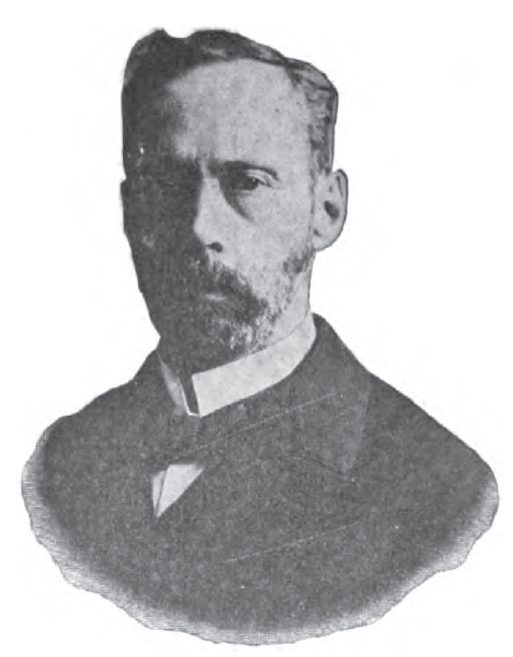

22nd Ohio Attorney General
- In office January 8, 1900 – January 11, 1904
- Governor: George K. Nash
- Preceded by: Frank S. Monnette
- Succeeded by: Wade H. Ellis

Personal details
- Born: May 26, 1854 Columbus Grove, Ohio
- Died: December 29, 1940 (aged 86) Palo Alto, California
- Party: Republican
- Spouse: Mary E. Scott
- Children: five
- Education: Baldwin College; University of Michigan Law School

John Marion Sheets (1854-1940) was a Republican politician from the U.S. state of Ohio. He was Ohio Attorney General from 1900 to 1904.

== Biography ==
Sheets was born May 26, 1854, at Columbus Grove, Putnam County, Ohio, was educated at public schools, and at age twenty began teaching. He entered Baldwin College in Berea in fall of 1876, and graduated in three years.

Sheets entered the University of Michigan Law School in 1879, and graduated in 1881. April 5, 1881, he was admitted to the bar, and opened an office in Ottawa. In 1893, he was elected as a Republican to judge of the Court of Common Pleas for the district composing Fulton, Henry, and Putnam counties. He was re-nominated in 1898, but fell 30 votes short of election.

The Republicans nominated Sheets for Attorney General in the summer of 1899, and he won election that autumn. He served four years.

Sheets married Mary E. Scott March 22, 1882. They were both students at the University of Michigan. They had a family of five daughters.

He died at Palo Alto Hospital in Palo Alto, California, in 1940. He was survived by his wife and five daughters.

== Notes ==
Legal offices
Preceded by Frank S. Monnette	Attorney General of Ohio; 1900–1904	Succeeded by Wade H. Ellis
