= Henry Washington (planter) =

American planter and legislator (1729–1825)

Member of the Virginia House of Delegates from Prince William County
- In office October 19, 1789 – October 17, 1790
- Preceded by: William Grayson
- Succeeded by: Richard Scott Blackburn

Personal details
- Born: September 10, 1749 Chotank Creek district, Stafford, Virginia
- Died: July 1825 (aged 75) Limestone County, Alabama, United States

Henry Washington (December 5, 1749 – July 1825) was an American planter and legislator who served as a Delegate from Prince William County in the Virginia House of Delegates, before moving to Shelbyville, Kentucky and the later Limestone County, Alabama.

== Early and family life ==
The eldest son of Bailey Washington, cousin of George Washington, and his wife Catherine Storke (1723–1804). He reputedly drew lots with his younger brother William Washington (1752–1810) as to who would fight in the American Revolutionary War and who would manage their father's farm. William became a war hero, and farmer Henry developed financial difficulties which led him to move west, then south to northern Alabama. The family also included Bailey Washington Jr. and daughters Elizabeth Washington Storke (1758–c. 1798) and Mary Butler Washington Peyton (1760–1822).

It is unconfirmed how many marriages Henry Washington had in his lifetime. It is speculated that he married a woman named Ann, who died without children. In 1779, he married Mildred Pratt (1761–1856), who would survive him and possibly another husband in Tennessee. Henry and Milley Washington had eleven children, all supposedly born in Prince William County. Their eldest child, Henry (1791–1818) died in Philadelphia, and their daughter Catherine Storke (1787–1869) married William Hooe Winter of Charles County, Maryland (1786–1833), and bore 15 children.

Winter received property from his father-in-law and built a house named Bradley (which remains off Route 775 in Prince William County) but moved to Colbert County, Alabama, and their descendants would move to Mississippi. Among the grandsons who fought for the Confederacy in the Civil War was William Brown Winter (1847–1929) who joined the 18th Mississippi Cavalry and whose son William Aylmer Winter and grandson William Forrest Winter become politicians. The eldest son who survived Henry Washington was Stark Washington (1796-1836), who married and moved to the Arkansas Territory before dying in Pine Bluff, Arkansas. Jane Elliott Washington married William Alexander Foote of Prince William County and died in Carroll County, Mississippi. John Henry Pratt Washington (1800–1860) moved to Hardeman County, Tennessee. Augustine Burkett Washington (1802–1875) never married but survived the Civil War, as did his youngest brother Col. Thomas Pratt Washington (1806–1873), who moved to Travis County, Texas before the conflict. His son John Henry Washington (1840–1926) mustered as a Texas Ranger, was wounded at the Battle of Shiloh, captured, exchanged and reenlisted. The youngest daughter, Frances (Fannie) Thacker Washington (1804–1879) married Dr. William Minor (d. 1854) and managed a plantation for her children as a widow, as well as taking care of her mother in her old age.

== Career ==
Henry Washington was raised to become a planter, farming with the use of enslaved labor. In the 1787 Virginia tax census, he owned 18 adult slaves and 20 enslaved teenagers, as well as 9 cattle, 25 horses and a 4-wheeled phaeton in Prince William County. In the first federal census for the same county in 1810, Henry Washington owned 45 slaves. Matters became complicated due to the fact that related men of the same name lived in both King George and Frederick counties. By the early 19th century, the Westmoreland County 1787 tax census shows a Henry Washington as owning about half as many slaves as his brother William, (14 adults compared to 23 owned by William, 13 teenagers vs. 23 owned by William) as well as 12 horses, 5 cattle and a two-wheeled carriage. Though it might initially seem odd that in both counties, as well as Albemarle County, where a "Henry Washington" owned 5 adult slaves, 6 teenage slaves, three horses and two cattle, for all three the residence column is zero, indicating this man did not actually live in that county when the census was taken. In fact, this man probably lived with this father and brother in Stafford County just south of Prince William, where the same 1787 tax census indicates both Bailey Washington Jr. and Bailey Washington Sr. and their distant cousin General George Washington owned slaves.

As long-term Prince William County leader (and former Continental Congressmen) William Grayson grew ill (and would die in 1790), Prince William County voters elected Henry Washington as one of their part-time representatives in the Virginia House of Delegates. However, in the next election they only re-elected his co-delegate, merchant Alexander Henderson. Major Richard Scott Blackburn, son of patriot war hero Thomas Blackburn, replaced Washington. His father and younger brother Bailey Washington Jr. also served in the state legislature, but represented their native Stafford County. Washington engaged in several property sales and purchases in Prince William County in the vicinity of Gainesville beginning around 1790. He bought property from, among others, Thomas Blackburn, Mann Page, and Mathew Harrison, who at other times represented Prince William County in the House of Delegates. He sold 47 acres (0.19 km^{2}) in Prince William County to Hugh Smith of Alexandria in 1815. This Henry Washington often experienced financial difficulties after the War of 1812, which twice led him to relocate his growing family, first to near Shelbyville, Kentucky, and later to Alabama (which was admitted to the Union in 1819). He established a plantation in what became Limestone County, Alabama (near the Tennessee border) where he lived his final years. The 1820 federal census does include an entry for a Henry Washington who owned a few slaves in Jeffersontown, Jefferson County, Kentucky, now a Louisville suburb west of Shelbyville on the Louisville to Frankfort road.

== Death and legacy ==
Henry Washington died in Limestone County, Alabama in July 1825. His second wife, though impoverished especially after the Civil War, moved in with their youngest daughter and survived until age 96.
