= Frank S. Monnett =

American lawyer (1857-1953)

Frank Sylvester Monnette
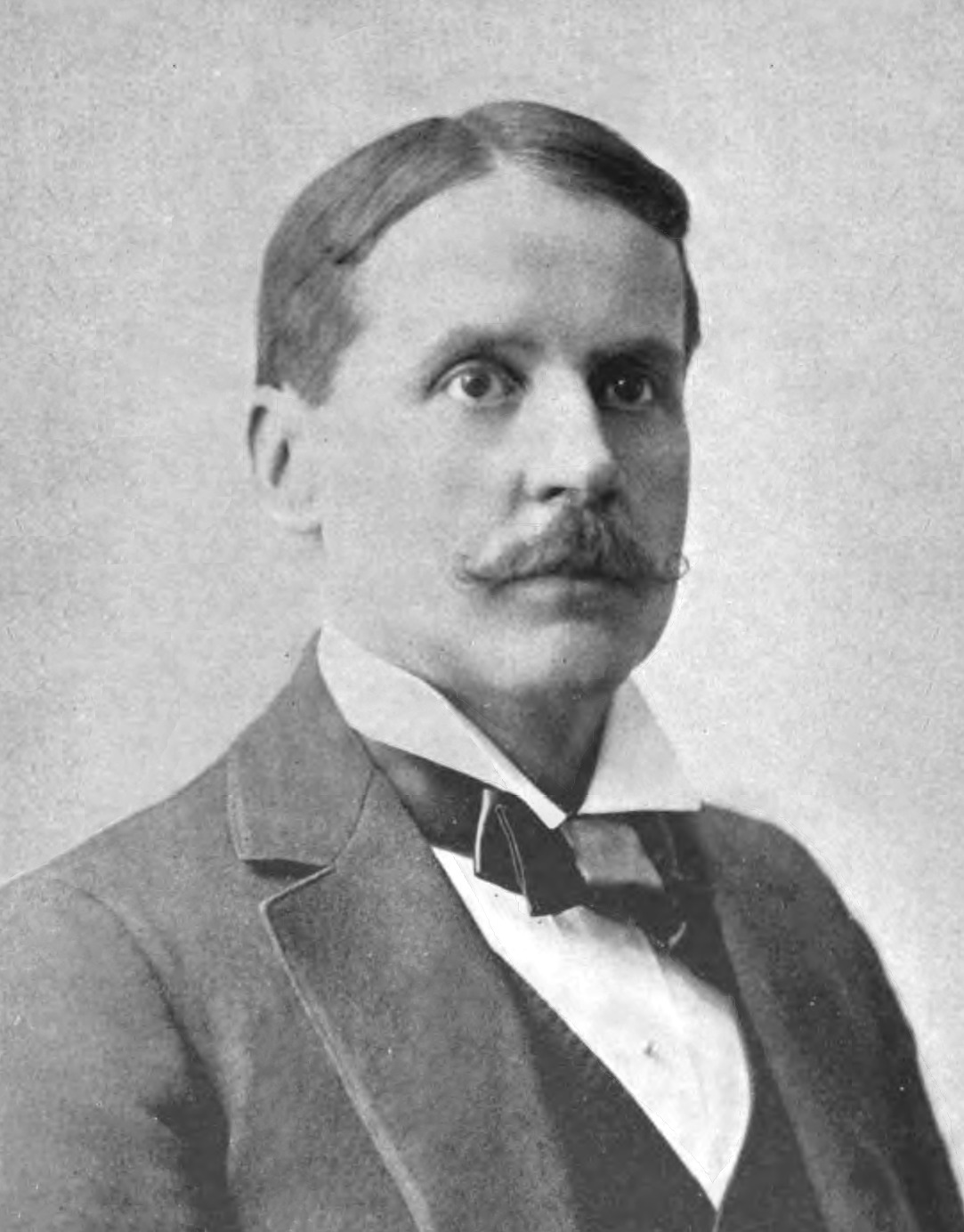
- Born: March 19, 1857; Hardin County, Ohio, US
- Died: April 21, 1953 (aged 96); Columbus, Ohio, US

Francis Sylvester Monnett (March 19, 1857 – April 21, 1953) was Ohio Attorney General from 1896–1900 as a member of the Republican Party. Under the administration of Monnette, the Ohio Attorney General's office pursued and won the first major victories that finally led to the permanent break-up of Standard Oil Trust established by John D. Rockefeller.

While previous courts had ordered the Trust to divide its interests, the company failed to do so until it was sued in the Ohio courts. While Monnett's term ended before the matter could be settled, the work done during his administration set the course for the final resolution. Rockefeller funds were lavishly donated to Monnette's opponents, which led to his loss in the November 1900 election.

Monnett also worked with Ohio Senator H. E. Valentine in the investigation of trust problems undertaken by a committee of the Ohio state senate in 1898. As a result of this probe, Ohio enacted the Valentine Act. Under the terms of the Valentine Act, legal trust practices were defined and illegal practices were outlawed. The act also specified criminal penalties for violations of the law.

He died in 1953 in Columbus, Ohio.

Legal offices
Preceded by John K. Richards	Ohio Attorney General; 1896–1900	Succeeded by John M. Sheets
