= John Pope (Virginia politician) =

American politician (1749-1802)

Member of the Virginia House of Delegates representing Prince William County, Virginia
- In office November 10, 1795 – November 30, 1800 Serving with Edward Brooke, Gerard Alexander, Thomas Mason
- Preceded by: Edward Carter
- Succeeded by: Mathew Harrison
- In office October 1, 1792 – October 20, 1793 Serving with Willoughby Tebbs
- Preceded by: Richard Scott Blackburn
- Succeeded by: Edward Carter

Member of the Virginia Senate representing Prince William and Fairfax County, Virginia
- In office October 15, 1787 – September 30, 1792
- Preceded by: Henry Lee
- Succeeded by: Ludwell Lee

Personal details
- Born: May 7, 1749 Westmoreland County, Colony of Virginia
- Died: August 13, 1802 (aged 53) Wilkes County, Georgia
- Resting place: Resthaven Cemetery, Wilkes County, Georgia
- Spouse: Margaret Hunter
- Children: 5
- Occupation: planter, politician

John Pope (May 7, 1749 – August 13, 1802) was a Virginia planter and politician who represented Prince William County, Virginia in both Houses of the Virginia General Assembly, first in the Senate, and then in the House of Delegates.

== Early and family life ==
The youngest son born to Hester Netherton (1712–1803) and her first husband, planter Worden Pope (1705–1749). John never knew his father, who died the year he was born. His father had been named to honor his godfather Dr. John Worden (d. 1716) and drafted a will as his death approached which appointed his neighbors Augustine Washington and Benjamin Weeks to assist his widow in administering his estate. However, his widow had other ideas, and the following year married Judge Lynaugh Helm (1712-1789) of what had been King George County (which in this era had boundary alterations with Stafford County, some of which ultimately became Prince William County, where Helm lived). Around 1650 this man's ancestor Nathaniel Pope moved from strife-torn Maryland into what became called the Northern Neck of Virginia (as did Humphrey Pope and James Pope, probably his brothers) and Nathaniel befriended a stranded British emigrant John Washington who eventually married his daughter Anne; Augustine was descended from that couple and was George Washington's father. John's mother, Hester Netherton Pope, was born in what was then Stafford County. Although the Pope family was well-established in Virginia, John and his elder brothers would become the first of its members to serve in the Virginia General Assembly, perhaps because of his stepfather's political activism. Helm was a fervent patriot who served on the Prince William County Committee of Safety before and during the Revolutionary War, and twice represented Prince William County in the Virginia House of Delegates after the conflict, before becoming a local judge. This man's elder brothers Ensign Benjamin Pope (1740-1816) and Col. William Pope (1745-1825) served during the conflict under General George Rogers Clark, in 1778 helped to establish a fort at the Falls of the Ohio River (that became Louisville, Kentucky), and moved westward to the frontier with their families afterward. They were joined by their sister Jane (1744-1821), who had married Helm's son Thomas Helm, who represented Prince William County in the Virginia House of Delegates once before moving westward with those Pope families and ultimately helped establish Hardin County, Kentucky). Benjamin and William Pope successively represented Jefferson County in the Virginia House of Delegates in the 1784/5 and 1785/86 sessions, before moving westward along the Ohio River and settling in Jefferson County, in what became Kentucky County, Virginia and later the state of Kentucky.

In 1781, John Pope married Margaret Hunter (1758-1836), daughter of the Scottish born Dr. John Hunter of Fairfax County. They would have five sons and a daughter, but three died around the same time as their father and two reached adulthood in Wilkes County, Georgia: Elizabeth Chapman Pope (1781–1802), Dr. John Hunter Pope (1782–1860), Alexander Pope (1786–1864), George Chapman Pope (1791–1804), William Henry Pope (1794–1867) and Thomas Jefferson Pope (1797–1802).

== Career ==
Unlike his elder brothers and brother-in-law, John Pope stayed in Virginia's Tidewater region after the war.

He helped establish the Potomac River port and town of Dumfries, and was one of its trustees in 1786. Fairfax and Prince William County voters elected Pope to represent them in the Senate of Virginia from 1787 until 1792, then Prince William County voters elected him as one of their part-time representatives in the Virginia House of Delegates for the remaining sessions of the century, except for a single-year gap in the 1793/94 session. He was a candidate to represent Virginia's 4th congressional district in 1789, losing to Richard Bland Lee.

Pope owned two adult slaves and three younger slaves in the 1787 tax census. In 1800 Pope moved his family to Wilkes County, Georgia, where he and two of his children died between 1802 and 1804, as did his former Dumfries, Virginia neighbor Richard Scott Blackburn, who had accepted a commission in the U.S. Army engineering corps. Wilkes County was the first established in Georgia, and in this era of conflict with indigenous peoples also established a plantation economy. It was the home of Eli Whitney, who invented the cotton gin, which helped foster the cotton economy and reliance on slaveholding throughout the American South. Although this Pope may not have been enumerated in the 1800 census, the last during his lifetime, in the 1830 federal census, his son Alexander Pope owned 43 slaves in Wilkes County and John H. Pope owned 42, with substantially lesser numbers owned by Margaret and William H. Pope (probably grandchildren) -- and the number of enslaved increased in the next censuses (in which the same names figure on several different pages).

== Death and legacy ==
Survived by his widow and two other children, Pope is buried in the family plot at Resthaven Cemetery in Wilkes County. Complicating matters is another early settler of the area with the same name but who emigrated from North Carolina (1755–1819).
