= Rippon Lodge =

Historic house in Virginia, United States

- U.S. National Register of Historic Places
- Virginia Landmarks Register
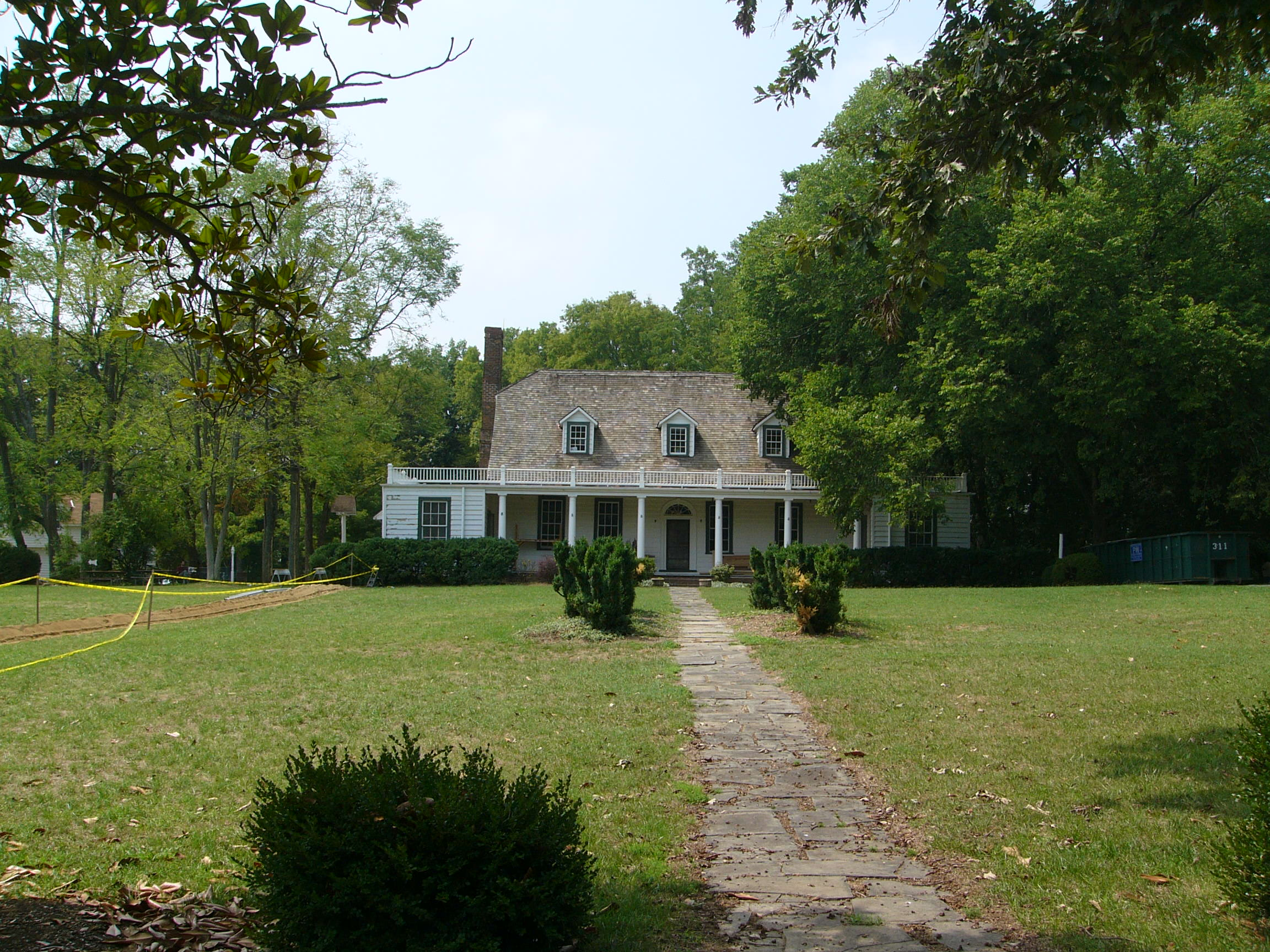
- Rippon Lodge

- Location within Northern Virginia Location within Virginia Location within the United States
- Interactive map showing the location of Rippon Lodge
- Nearest city: Woodbridge, Virginia
- Coordinates: 38°36′51.3576″N 77°16′38.4234″W
- Area: 40 acres (16 ha)
- NRHP reference No.: 71000988
- VLR No.: 076-0023

Significant dates
- Added to NRHP: July 2, 1971
- Designated VLR: January 5, 1971

Rippon Lodge is one of the oldest houses remaining in Prince William County, Virginia, United States, and listed on the National Register of Historic Places since 1971. Built around 1747 by Richard Blackburn (1705-1757) as the main residence and headquarters of his plantation, it lies on high ground overlooking Neabsco Creek at the south end of what is now the unincorporated town of Woodbridge at 15520 Blackburn Road. The house takes its name from Richard Blackburn's birthplace, the small city of Ripon in North Yorkshire, England.

== History ==
The plantation house is located along a remnant of the original Kings Highway (now known as the "Washington–Rochambeau Revolutionary Route" ). This vital roadway connected the 13 original colonies, stretching from Newport, Rhode Island to Charleston, South Carolina. It played a vital role in the American Revolutionary War, in part because colonial troops marched on this section before defeating the British at Yorktown.

Originally a tobacco plantation, at its greatest extent under Richard Blackburn (ca. 1706-1757) who had emigrated with his brother from Ripon in Yorkshire, England in 1720, it managed land holdings which stretched from Neabsco Creek westward to near what is now I-95 and amounted to about 21,000 acres (85 km^{2}). The property featured its own port on Neabsco Creek and is close to the town of Dumfries, once the county seat until the Quantico River silted up early in the 19th century. In 1796, Benjamin Henry Latrobe painted the plantation house.

Richard Blackburn farmed and built this and other houses using enslaved labor. At his death, the house passed to his son, Col.Thomas Blackburn who represented Prince William County several times in the House of Burgesses, then in most of the Virginia Revolutionary Conventions, before becoming an aide-de-camp to General George Washington, until wounded at the Battle of Germantown. His son Richard Scott Blackburn would also represent Prince William County, in the Virginia House of Delegates. Thomas Blackburn corresponded with Thomas Jefferson and also did business with Bushrod Washington who inherited his uncle's Mount Vernon plantation as well as married one of Thomas Blackburn's daughters. Rippon Lodge remained in Blackburn family hands until around 1820, when it was sold to the Atkinson family, who also farmed using enslaved labor until after the American Civil War, and whose members lived there for about another century.

In 1923 the property was sold again. The buyers were former Ohio Attorney General Wade H. Ellis and his wife Dessie, who had moved to Washington, D.C. after Wade Ellis accepted a position as assistant to the U.S. Attorney General. The Ellises both renovated and preserved the property. Sometime after buying Rippon Lodge, Ellis discovered Richard Blackburn was his ancestor, but it remains unclear at what point during his tenure this became known and how much it influenced the preservation efforts. After Wade Ellis died, Mrs. Ellis sold the house to another Blackburn family member, Admiral Richard Blackburn Black, an Arctic explorer and compatriot of Admiral Byrd. Admiral Black's daughter inherited the house in 1989 and sold it to Prince William County in 2000. The house and grounds are now maintained by the Prince William County Department of Parks and Recreation, and by a local friends organization.

== Hours ==
Prince William County has restored the house and maintains the surrounding 42 acres (170,000 m^{2}) of property. Rippon Lodge is open to the public from May through October on Fridays, Saturdays and Sundays from 11am to 4pm.
