= Ulysses G. Denman =

American politician

Ulysses Grant Denman
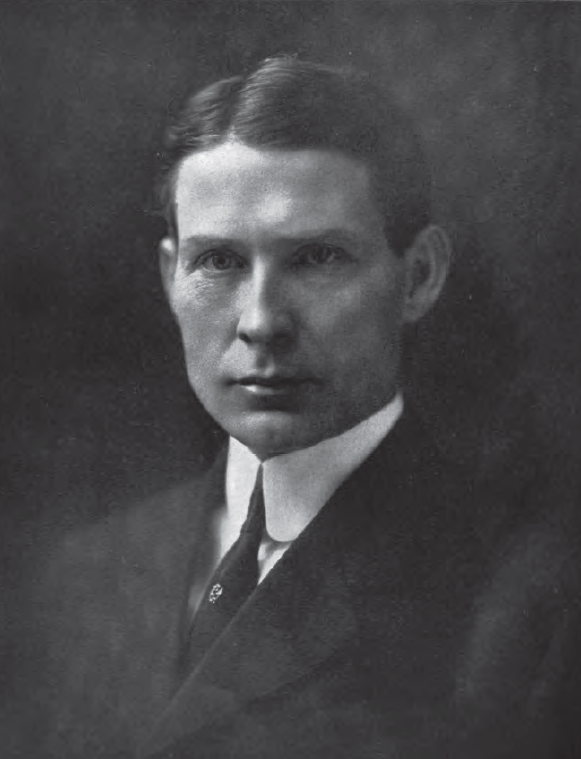

24th Ohio Attorney General
- In office November 6, 1908 – January 9, 1911
- Appointed by: Andrew L. Harris
- Preceded by: Wade H. Ellis
- Succeeded by: Timothy S. Hogan

Personal details
- Born: November 24, 1866 Willshire, Ohio, US
- Died: October 30, 1962 (aged 95) Toledo, Ohio, US
- Party: Republican
- Spouse: Francis May Neptune
- Children: one
- Education: National Normal University; Northern Indiana Normal School; University of Michigan Law School

Ulysses Grant Denman (November 26, 1866 – October 30, 1962) was a Republican politician from the state of Ohio. He was Ohio Attorney General from 1908 to 1911.

Denman was born November 24, 1866, at Willshire, Ohio. Graduated from the public schools of Willshire, National Normal University in Lebanon, Ohio, and Northern Indiana Normal School in Valparaiso, Indiana. He was named Superintendent of the Public Schools of Willshire in 1889, which he retained for three years. He then entered law school in 1892. He graduated from the University of Michigan Law School in 1894. He was admitted to the Ohio bar in 1894, and to practice at the United States Supreme Court in 1904.

Denman was married to Francis May Neptune on December 26, 1890, and had one daughter. He was a Methodist by faith, and member of BPOE. He practiced law in Toledo, Ohio.

Denman was Assistant City Solicitor of Toledo 1899-1901, and represented Lucas County in the Ohio House of Representatives in the 65th General Assembly, 1902 to 1903. He was elected as a Republican to State Attorney General in 1908. November 6, 1908, Attorney General Wade H. Ellis resigned, and Denman was appointed by Governor Harris to fill the interim until his two-year term began January, 1909. He was appointed United States District Attorney for the Northern District of Ohio in 1911, resigning in 1914.

Denman died in 1962 at a nursing home.

== Notes ==
Legal offices
Preceded by Wade H. Ellis	Ohio Attorney General; 1908-1911	Succeeded by Timothy S. Hogan
Ohio House of Representatives
Preceded by George Demuth	Representative from Lucas County; 1902-1903	Succeeded by Charles Farner
