= Leedstown, Virginia =

Unincorporated community in Virginia, US

Coordinates: 38°06′41″N 76°59′55″W

Leedstown is an unincorporated community in Westmoreland County, in the U. S. state of Virginia. It is the site of the signing of the Leedstown Resolutions.

== History ==
Sometime before 1678, Edward Bray had built a brick church, an ordinary, ferry, and wharf at the present Leedstown. Up to this date the site was known as Rappahannock. After 1678, it was known as Bray's Wharf or Bray's Church. By 1742, it was known as Leeds. Later it was known as Leedstown. Leedstown was created a town by an act of the Virginia House of Burgesses in 1742.

In colonial days, Leedstown was not only a place for commerce. General George Washington often visited Leedstown. There was a ferry across the river to Layton, on the south side of the river in Essex County (it operated until about 1927 when the Downings Bridge to Tappahannock opened). Following the Revolutionary War shipping at Leedstown began to decline as many planters moved west into the Kentucky and Ohio territories.

Late in the 19th century, Leedstown had a slight revival steaming from visits of the Rappahannock River Steamboat Line.
