= Thomas Blackburn (burgess) =

Colonel Thomas Blackburn

Member of the House of Burgesses representing
- In office 1774–1775 Serving with Henry Lee
- Preceded by: Foushee Tebbs
- Succeeded by: n/a

Personal details
- Born: January 15, 1742
- Died: July 7, 1807 (aged 65) Rippon Lodge, Prince William County, Virginia
- Occupation: planter, military officer, politician

Military service
- Branch/service: Virginia militia
- Years of service: 1776–1777
- Rank: Lt.Colonel
- Unit: 2nd Virginia Regiment
- Battles/wars: Battle of Germantown

Thomas Blackburn (January 15, 1742 – July 8, 1807) was a Virginia officer, planter and politician who represented Prince William County, Virginia in the last sessions of the House of Burgesses and in most of the Virginia Revolutionary Conventions alongside future general and Virginia Governor Lighthorse Harry Lee. He may today be best known as a correspondent with Presidents George Washington and Thomas Jefferson, as the father of two women who married owners of Mount Vernon plantation, or for his plantation, Rippon Lodge, the remnants of which were placed on the National Register of Historic Places in 1971 and are now operated as a Prince William County park.

== Early and family life ==
The youngest son born to the former Mary Watts (d. 1775; widow of Col. Henry Ashton of Westmoreland County) and her master builder husband Richard Blackburn (d. 1757) was born at Rippon Lodge, the plantation house which his English-born father had built around 1745, and which he inherited because his elder brothers died before their father. His elder half brother was among the six people who died in a boating accident on the Potomac River in 1752. His sister Alice married Col. Thomas Ellzey of nearby Loudoun County.

On January 21, 1759/60, Thomas Blackburn married Christian Scott (1745-1815), the daughter of Rev. James Scott of Overwharton Parish, who would survive him by nearly a decade. Both their sons began military careers. Richard Scott Blackburn would continue his father's political career by twice winning election to serve as one of Prince William County's representatives in the Virginia House of Delegates before accepting a commission as captain in the U.S. Army by 1800, and was promoted to major before dying while on duty in Georgia in late 1803. His younger brother Thomas Blackburn Jr. served under his brother in the local militia as a private before accepting a lieutenant's commission in the U.S. Army in 1799, but he resigned and become a planter ("Yorkshire" plantation being on both sides of Bull Run in Prince William County and Fairfax County) before dying in 1813.

The family also included four daughters (Mary Elizabeth, Catherine, Sarah and Julia Ann) and took in the widow of his son Richard (Ann Blause) and four granddaughters. Accounts of their names have become confused, possibly because of confusion between the generations of men named Thomas Blackburn, as well as another Blackburn family who lived in southwest Virginia and descended from Archibald Blackburn (who emigrated from Ireland). All agree that this man's youngest daughter Julia Ann Blackburn married Bushrod Washington, the nephew of President George Washington who became an associate justice of the U.S. Supreme Court as well as inherited his uncle's Mount Vernon plantation. Her eldest sister Mary Elizabeth (a/k/a Polly) died at age 15 of tuberculosis in Bermuda. The other daughters referred to in this man's will were Catherine (Kitty) who married Henry Smith Turner of Jefferson County and Sarah who married Thomas Crawford of Prince George's County, Maryland. Jane Charlotte Blackburn (probably their niece, daughter of Richard Scott Blackburn) married Justice Washington's nephew, John Augustine Washington II, who inherited Mount Vernon from his childless uncle, but whose husband died while their children were still young. Thus, she effectively served as that plantation's mistress for decades (but for most of that time chose to live at another historic plantation, Blakeley in what later became West Virginia).

== Career ==
Like his father, Blackburn operated his plantations using enslaved labor. As his father's executor, he was responsible for settling his father's estate, which had debts as well as various properties from Prince William County westward to the Shenandoah Valley, including in Frederick County, Virginia. During his lifetime, Blackburn operated two separated plantations in Prince William County. Rippon Lodge was in the eastern portion. The "Yorkshire" plantation was in the west (partly on the other side of Bull Run in Fairfax County). Thus, in the 1787 Virginia tax census, Col. Thomas Blackburn was responsible for taxes in both the county's tax assessment lists. That for the Yorkshire plantation showed Blackburn as owning 19 enslaved adults and 8 slaves younger than 16, as well as 12 horses and 37 cattle, all managed by John Dudley; in the other he owned 10 adult and 3 younger slaves, as well as eight horses, 19 cattle and a four-wheeled carriage.

In 1764, Blackburn began his public career by accepting the office of justice of the peace for Prince William County, and would continue as one of the county's justices until 1770. In that era, legal training was not required to hold such office, and the justices of each county collectively administered the county, in addition to handling judicial cases that could be appealed to higher courts. In 1771-72 the General Assembly named him as one of the commissioners responsible for disposing of water-damaged tobacco in state warehouses, and providing relief for those who had entrusted tobacco to those warehouses.

As relations with Great Britain became strained, Blackburn became a member of Prince William County's Committee of Safety. In 1774, he was elected as one of the county's two representatives in the House of Burgesses, alongside fellow planter and veteran legislator Henry Lee. When Virginia's last royal governor, Lord Dunmore, suppressed (prorogued) the colony's legislature, Prince William County voters elected Blackburn and Lee as their representatives to four of the six Virginia Revolutionary Conventions.

Both Lee and Blackburn had been militia officers and volunteered to serve under General George Washington. His troops elected Blackburn lieutenant colonel on December 20, 1776, but he resigned that commission the following June when the colonel retired and another man was promoted instead of Blackburn. Blackburn then volunteered to become an aide de camp to the commander in chief, but was probably conveying messages from the 13th Virginia Regiment (in which Richard S. Blackburn served) or his former colleague Gen. Peter Muhlenburg when he received a serious thigh wound at the Battle of Germantown on October 4, 1777. The lead bullet made riding a horse painful and caused him to walk with a limp; it would not be removed from his body for many years, due to its placement and surgical limitations at the time. Thus, while Lee's service continued, Blackburn returned home to Rippon Lodge. He continued to support the war effort and one winter quartered a regiment of Continental troops on his property, feeding as well as clothing them before they resumed military operations in the spring.

Virginia governor Thomas Jefferson in 1780 offered Blackburn a position on the Governor's Council, but Blackburn declined, citing his deafness. He also hosted and corresponded with his former commander and U.S. President George Washington, and while physically unable to carry the coffin, was among the lead mourners at the late President's funeral.

In the 1790s, Blackburn, his wife and daughter spent about two years in Bermuda, vainly hoping the climate would cure their daughter's tuberculosis. Following her death, they returned to Prince William County.

== Death and legacy ==
Col. Blackburn died at Rippon Lodge after drafting a last will and testament. He bequeathed Rippon Lodge to descendants of his eldest son, who died three years previously, subject to a debt he owed to his son-in-law Bushrod Washington. He also bequeathed two slaves to his grandson (by R.S. Blackburn) Bushrod Washington Blackburn. Other than bequests to the three remaining daughters, his son Thomas Blackburn inherited the remainder of the estate. Blackburn and his widow are buried in the family graveyard on the site, although the exact location is unknown. Only a handful of gravestones (including those of his mother and father, erected by local burgess John Baylis) remained by the early 20th century when the graveyard was restored as described below, but memorial tablets were erected in that era and modern times.

Blackburn also had considerable debts, and his main creditor was his son-in-law Bushrod Washington. Several times, his heirs petitioned Congress for compensation and bounty land for his revolutionary service, but never succeeded.

Thus, in 1811, Bushrod Washington sold Rippon Lodge to George R. Atkinson, who had emigrated from England to Virginia, fighting to defend Richmond during the War of 1812, then moving to Fairfax County. Atkinson's family would occupy and operate the property through the Civil War, despite Atkinson not complying with his part of the sales contract, which required periodic payments. Thus, Bushrod Washington took Atkinson to court, and when he died in 1829, his executor continued the process, as well as tried to resell the property to Benjamin Dyer and Richard Stonnell. Eventually, Atkinson paid for the property in 1842, but died two years later, so his son Richard Atkinson inherited the property. On his death in 1855 his underage son George Atkinson inherited it, but when he came of age after the conflict, operated it on a much reduced level, and the buildings also deteriorated. About a decade after George Atkinson's death in 1901, Rippon Lodge was acquired by the retired Marron brothers, who in 1924 sold it to Wade H. Ellis, who could trace his descent to Richard Blackburn, and who between his work for the U.S. Department of Justice and private legal practice in Washington D.C. and Cincinnati, Ohio, during the 1930s restored and expanded the old house in the Colonial Revival style. Ellis also restored the graveyard (which has at least 35 and possibly more than 60 gravesites) and relocated several gravestones from endangered places in Prince William County (including those of burgess Martin Scarlett and Rose Peters, who died in 1649 or 1670). The Ellis' had no children and the property was sold to Admiral Richard Blackburn Black, an antarctic explorer, who submitted the paperwork which placed the property on the National Register of Historic Places in 1970. Prince William County acquired the property in 2000 from Admiral Black's' granddaughter, restored it and opened it to the public in 2007.
