= Richard Scott Blackburn =

American politician & US army officer (1760-1804)

Member of the Virginia House of Delegates representing Prince William County, Virginia
- In office October 18, 1790 – September 30, 1791 Serving with Alexander Henderson, Willoughby Tebbs
- Preceded by: Henry Washington
- Succeeded by: John Pope

Personal details
- Born: c. 1760 Rippon Lodge, Prince William County, Colony of Virginia
- Died: November 1803 (aged about 43) Fort Washington, Georgia, U.S.
- Resting place: Rippon Lodge Cemetery, Prince William County, Virginia
- Spouse: Judith Ball (m. c. 1885)
- Occupation: Planter; military officer; politician

Military service
- Branch/service: U.S. Army
- Years of service: 1800–1803
- Rank: Major
- Unit: Regiment of Artillerists and Engineers
- Battles/wars: None recorded (died while on garrison duty)

Richard Scott Blackburn (c. 1760 – November 1803) was a Virginia planter and politician who became an officer in the U.S. Army

== Early and family life ==
The eldest son of Col. Thomas Blackburn and his wife Christian Scott was born to the patriotic gentry of Prince William County, Virginia. He was likely born between 1762 and 1764, since he is listed on the Prince William County tax rolls as under 21 years old in 1781 and had an individual listing in 1787. The family included a younger brother, Thomas Blackburn Jr. (d. 1813 in Fairfax County) and four sisters, of whom three survived to adulthood.

Richard Blackburn married Judith Ball, the daughter of John and Mary Ball of nearby Fauquier County. Two of their daughters married the sons of Corbin Washington and Hannah Lee (daughter of Gen. Richard Henry Lee of "Chantilly" in Westmoreland County), who were raised by his sister Julia Ann Blackburn and her husband Justice Bushrod Washington. Bushrod Corbin Washington of "Claymont Court" in Jefferson County married Anna Maria Thomasina Blackburn (d. 1830) and had two children. Their daughter Hannah Lee Washington (b. 1811 would marry Dr. William P. Alexander) and their son Thomas Blackburn Washington (1813–1854) farmed in western Virginia. John Augustine Washington (1792–1832) married her sister Jane Charlotte Blackburn (d. 1856), who managed Mount Vernon for decades on behalf of their children. Both their sons became Confederate officers John Augustine Washington III (1820–1861) and Richard Blackburn Washington (1822–1910); their sister Anna Maria Washington Alexander (1834–1862), who had married Dr. Alexander also died during the conflict, presumably of natural causes.

== Career ==
Blackburn operated his father's plantations in Prince William County as his parents and sister Polly vainly traveled to Bermuda hoping that the sea climate could improve their health.

Prince William County voters elected him to the Virginia House of Delegates (then a one-year part time position) twice. He was succeeded by John Pope, who had previously served in the Virginia Senate, and would win re-election to the lower house (also a part time position) until 1799.

Richard Scott Blackburn was mentioned as a captain of the First Regiment of Artillerists and Engineers of the U.S. Army in General James Wilkinson's Order book for Washington City on October 7, 1800, and Nov. 14, 1800 He also posted a reward notice for deserters as captain of that regiment in Dumfries in the National Intelligencer. He was promoted to major in 1803.

== Death and legacy ==
Blackburn died while on duty at Fort Washington (now Washington, Wilkes County, Georgia), four years before his father. His father bequeathed Rippon Lodge to his grandchildren by this son, expecting it to be sold to pay debts owed to Bushrod Washington on this son's behalf. His brother Thomas Blackburn Jr. was administrator of his estate in Virginia, and paid for the coffin as well as received his final pay and sold a slave on the estate's behalf. He is mentioned as both deceased and with the rank of "Major" in the marriage notice of his daughter. The University of Michigan library has a journal he kept traveling from Winchester, Virginia to meet Gen. James Wilkinson in Lexington, Kentucky, and then travel down to New Orleans.
