= Richard Henry Lee =

American statesman and Founding Father (1732–1794)

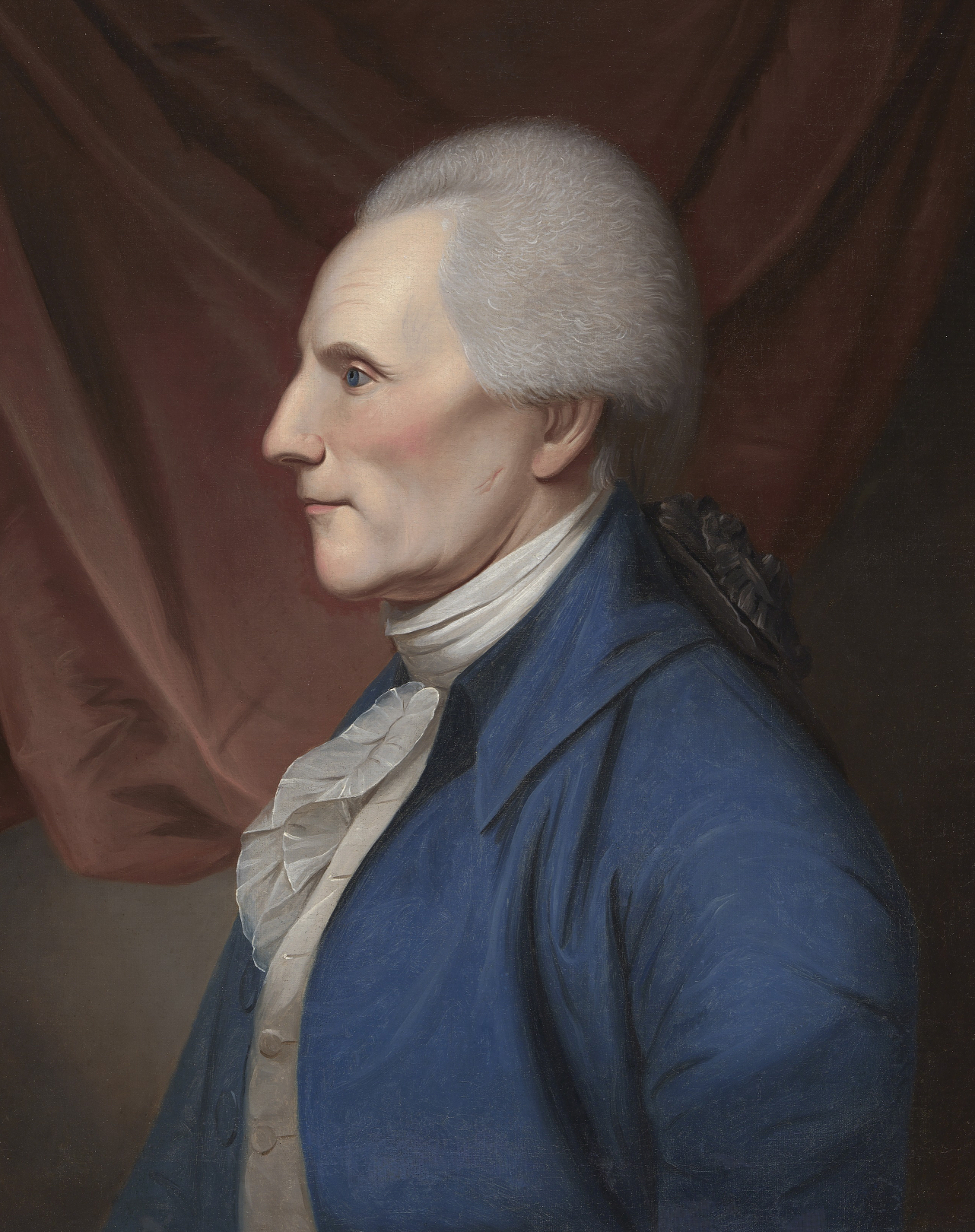
- Portrait by Charles Willson Peale, c. 1795–1805

President pro tempore of the United States Senate
- In office April 18, 1792 – October 8, 1792
- Preceded by: John Langdon
- Succeeded by: John Langdon

United States Senator from Virginia
- In office March 4, 1789 – October 8, 1792
- Preceded by: Inaugural Holder
- Succeeded by: John Taylor

6th President of the Confederation Congress
- In office November 30, 1784 – November 4, 1785
- Preceded by: Thomas Mifflin
- Succeeded by: John Hancock

Delegate to the Congress of the Confederation from Virginia
- In office November 1, 1784 – October 30, 1787

Member of the Virginia House of Burgesses from Westmoreland County
- In office September 14, 1758 – May 6, 1776
- Preceded by: Augustine Washington Jr.
- Succeeded by: Position abolished

Personal details
- Born: January 20, 1732 Stratford Hall, Westmoreland County, Colony of Virginia, British America
- Died: June 19, 1794 (aged 62) Chantilly Plantation, Westmoreland County, Virginia, U.S.
- Resting place: Burnt House Fields, Lee Family Estate, Coles Point, Westmoreland County, Virginia
- Party: Anti-Administration
- Spouse(s): Anne Aylett (m. 1757; died 1768) Anne (Gaskins) Pinckard (m. 1769)
- Children: 13, including Thomas and Ludwell
- Parent(s): Thomas Lee; Hannah Harrison Ludwell
- Profession: Law

Richard Henry Lee (January 20, 1732 – June 19, 1794) was an American statesman and Founding Father from Virginia, best known for the June 1776 Lee Resolution, the motion in the Second Continental Congress calling for the colonies' independence from Great Britain leading to the United States Declaration of Independence, which he signed. Lee also served a one-year term as the president of the Continental Congress, proposed and was a signatory to the Continental Association, signed the Articles of Confederation, and was a United States senator from Virginia from 1789 to 1792, serving part of that time as the second president pro tempore of the upper house. He was a member of the Lee family, a historically influential family in Virginia politics.

== Early life and education ==
Lee was born in Westmoreland County, Virginia, to Colonel Thomas Lee and Hannah Harrison Ludwell Lee on January 20, 1732. He came from a line of military officers, diplomats, and legislators. His father served on the Governor's council and briefly as an interim governor of Virginia before his death in 1750. Lee spent most of his early life in Stratford, Virginia, at Stratford Hall. Here he was tutored and taught a variety of skills. To develop his political career, his father sent him around to neighboring planters with the intention for Lee to become associated with neighboring men of like prominence. In 1748, at 16, Lee left Virginia for Yorkshire, England, to complete his formal education at Queen Elizabeth Grammar School, Wakefield. Both of his parents died in 1750. In 1753, after touring Europe, he returned to Virginia to help his brothers settle the estate his parents had left behind.

== Career ==
In 1757, Lee was appointed justice of the peace of Westmoreland County. In 1758, he was elected to the Virginia House of Burgesses, where he met Patrick Henry. Lee remained a "valuable ally of ... Henry and Samuel Adams" throughout the American Revolutionary War. An early advocate of independence, Lee became one of the first to create a Committees of Correspondence among the many independence-minded Americans in the various colonies. In 1766, almost ten years before the American Revolutionary War, Lee is credited with having authored the Westmoreland Resolution against enforcement of the British Stamp Act 1765, which was publicly signed by prominent landowners who met at Leedstown, Virginia, on February 27, 1766. Among the signers were three additional Lee brothers, as well as one close cousin of George Washington.

=== American Revolution ===
At first, Lee signed up to be a collector for the Stamp Act in 1764, but In August 1774, Lee was chosen as a delegate to the First Continental Congress in Philadelphia. On June 7, 1776 (during the Second Continental Congress), Lee put forth the motion for the Continental Congress to declare Independence from Great Britain, which read (in part):

Resolved: That these united colonies are, and of right ought to be, free and independent States, that they are absolved from all allegiance to the British crown, and that all political connection between them and the state of great Britain is, and ought to be, totally dissolved.

Lee had returned to Virginia by the time Congress voted on and adopted the Declaration of Independence, but he signed the document when he returned to Congress.

During the conflict, Lee also served the Virginia House of Delegates, but did not fight, in part because he was subject to debilitating illnesses (including epilepsy). That had caused him to return to Virginia from the Continental Congress to recover his health. However, when in August 1781 three British gunboats on the Potomac River dispatched raiders to attack his plantation on the Northern Neck, he and other Virginia militiamen, although outnumbered, engaged the marauders and drove them back to their boats. His cousin, Lighthorse Harry Lee would be the family's military hero of the conflict, and his younger brother Arthur Lee served as a diplomat in Europe.

Lee Family Coat of Arms

=== President of Congress ===
Lee was elected the sixth president of Congress under the Articles of Confederation on November 30, 1784, in the French Arms Tavern, Trenton, New Jersey. Congress convened on January 11, 1785, in the old New York City Hall, with Lee presiding until November 23, 1785. Although he was not paid a salary, his household expenses were covered in the amount of $12,203.13.

Lee abhorred the notion of imposing federal taxes and believed that continuing to borrow foreign money was imprudent. Throughout his term, he maintained that the states should relinquish their claims in the Northwest Territory, enabling the federal government to fund its obligations through land sales. He wrote to friend and colleague Samuel Adams:

I hope we shall shortly finish our plan for disposing of the western Lands to discharge the oppressive public debt created by the war & I think that if this source of revenue be rightly managed, that these republics may soon be discharged from that state of oppression and distress that an indebted people must invariably feel.

Debate began on the expansion of the Land Ordinance of 1784 and Thomas Jefferson's survey method; namely, "hundreds of ten geographical miles square, each mile containing 6086 and 4-10ths of a foot" and "sub-divided into lots of one mile square each, or 850 and 4-10ths of an acre" on April 14. On May 3, 1785, William Grayson of Virginia made a motion, seconded by James Monroe, to change "seven miles square" to "six miles square."

The Land Ordinance of 1785 passed on May 20, 1785, yet the federal government lacked the resources to manage the newly surveyed lands. Not only did Native Americans refuse to relinquish their hold on the platted territory, but much of the remaining land was occupied by squatters. With Congress unable to muster magistrates or troops to enforce the dollar-per-acre title fee, Lee's plan ultimately failed, although the survey system developed under the Land Ordinance of 1785 has endured.

=== US Senate ===
Lee prevailed over James Madison in the Virginia legislature's election of the state's first U.S. Senators, where both Lee and their other first U.S. Senator, William Grayson, were anti-Federalists who had opposed ratification of the Constitution that Madison, a Federalist, had largely written and advocated an immediate addition of the Bill of Rights. Lee and Grayson were the only members of the first U.S. Senate who had opposed ratification of the Constitution.

Lee served in the United States Senate in the First and Second Congresses from 1789 to 1792. In 1792 he became the second president pro tempore, but later that year he was obliged to resign due to his failing health, and he retired from public life.

=== Political offices ===
- Justice of the Peace for Westmoreland County, Virginia (1757)
- Virginia House of Burgesses (1758–1775)
- Member of the Continental Congress (1774–1779, 1784–1785, 1787)
- Virginia House of Delegates (1777, 1780, 1785)
- President of the Confederation Congress (November 30, 1784 – November 4, 1785)
- United States Senator from Virginia (March 4, 1789 – October 8, 1792)
- President pro tempore during the Second Congress (April 18 – October 8, 1792)

== Personal life and family ==
Lee's mother Hannah Harrison Ludwell died in 1750. On December 5, 1757, he married Anne Aylett, daughter of William Aylett. Anne died on December 12, 1768. The couple had six children, four of whom survived infancy, including Thomas Jesse Lee and Ludwell Lee. Lee remarried in June or July 1769 to Anne (Gaskins) Pinckard. The couple had seven children, five of whom survived infancy.

Lee honored his brother, Francis Lightfoot Lee (another signer of the Articles of Confederation and the Declaration of Independence), by naming one of his sons after him.

== Death and legacy ==
Lee died on June 19, 1794, at the age of 62. Schools in Rossmoor, California, and Glen Burnie, Maryland, are named after him, and Richard Henry Lee School in Chicago is named in his honor. The World War II Liberty Ship SS Richard Henry Lee was named in his honor. The Chantilly Archaeological Site was listed on the National Register of Historic Places in 1971.

Lee is portrayed in Sherman Edwards' 1969 musical 1776 by actor Ron Holgate, who won a Tony Award for his performance. Ron Holgate reprised his role as Richard Henry Lee in the film version of 1776, which was released in 1972.

== See also ==
- Memorial to the 56 Signers of the Declaration of Independence
- Federal Farmer

Political offices
Preceded by Thomas Mifflin	President of the Confederation Congress; November 30, 1784 – November 6, 1785	Succeeded by John Hancock
Preceded by John Langdon	President pro tempore of the United States Senate; April 18, 1792 – October 8, 1792	Succeeded by John Langdon
U.S. Senate
Preceded by None	U.S. senator (Class 2) from Virginia; March 4, 1789 – October 8, 1792; Served alongside: William Grayson, John Walker, James Monroe	Succeeded by John Taylor
