= Paul Hackett (veteran advocate) =

American lawyer

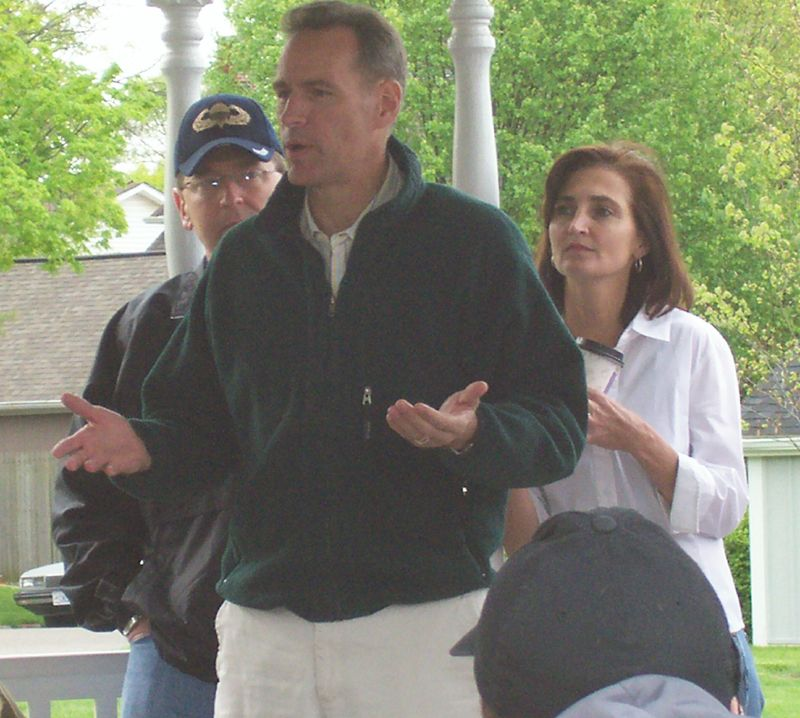
Paul Hackett (center) and his wife, Suzi

Paul Lewis Hackett III (born October 21, 1963) is an American lawyer and veteran advocate. An Iraq War veteran with the Marine Corps, he was the Democratic Party nominee in the 2005 Ohio's 2nd congressional district special election, which he narrowly lost to Jean Schmidt.

Hackett's campaign attracted national attention and substantial expenditures by both parties. It was viewed by some observers as the first round of the 2006 United States elections. In October 2005, Hackett said he would seek the Democratic nomination in 2006 to challenge incumbent U.S. Senator Mike DeWine; however, he dropped out of the race on February 14, 2006, and returned to his law practice.

== Education and early career ==
Hackett received a Juris Doctor degree from Cleveland State University and completed graduate studies in journalism at American University. He was admitted to the Ohio bar in 1988. Although he had been commissioned in the United States Marine Corps in 1985, he received a three-year law deferment before reporting to the Naval Justice School. Following his graduation, he served on active duty as a Marine Corps judge-advocate, including two years stationed on Okinawa Island, Japan. Hackett left active duty in 1992 but remained in the Marine Corps Reserve until 1999. Upon returning to Ohio, he established a private law practice in 1994.

Hackett served on the city council of Milford, Ohio, from 1995 to 1998. Despite his opposition to the Iraq War, Hackett began discussing a return to active military service with his wife in 2003 and volunteered for deployment the following year. He served in Iraq in 2004 and returned to Ohio in 2005.

== 2005 Ohio's 2nd congressional district special election ==
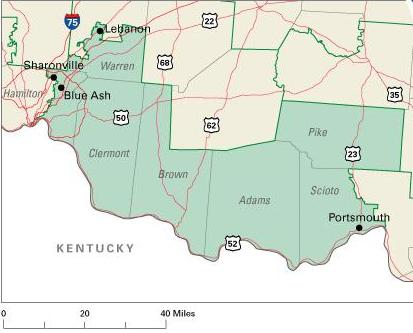
Ohio's 2nd congressional district in 2005

Hackett entered the 2005 special election for Ohio's 2nd congressional district as a Democrat. Reflecting on his military service, he told The Cincinnati Post that "with all that this country has given me, I felt it wasn't right for me to be enjoying life in Indian Hill when Marines were fighting and dying in Iraq". The immediate catalyst was incumbent Republican Rob Portman's resignation to become United States Trade Representative.

Hackett's opponent in the August 2, 2005, special election was Republican nominee Jean Schmidt, a former schoolteacher who had served eleven years as a township trustee in Miami Township, Clermont County, followed by four years in the Ohio House of Representatives. President George W. Bush had carried the district with 64 percent of the vote in 2004, and Portman had never fallen below 70 percent in his own campaigns. No Democrat had won the district in since Thomas A. Luken, who won a 1974 special election to fill the vacancy left by the resignation of William J. Keating, only to lose the subsequent November contest for a full term.

Pollsters and academic observers considered it safely Republican; University of Akron political science professor John Green described the contest as "a real steep uphill climb," while University of Cincinnati adjunct professor Jane S. Anderson, herself a twice-unsuccessful Democratic candidate, argued that a strong showing by Hackett would nonetheless carry strategic value for the party by signaling Democratic competitiveness in Republican strongholds. Dayton Daily News editorial page editor Martin Gottlieb characterized the district's lopsided Republican outcomes as a self-fulfilling prophecy, attributing them to a cycle in which Democratic candidates attracted neither serious investment nor meaningful attention, thereby ensuring the very defeats that discouraged future efforts.

=== Criticism of Schmidt ===
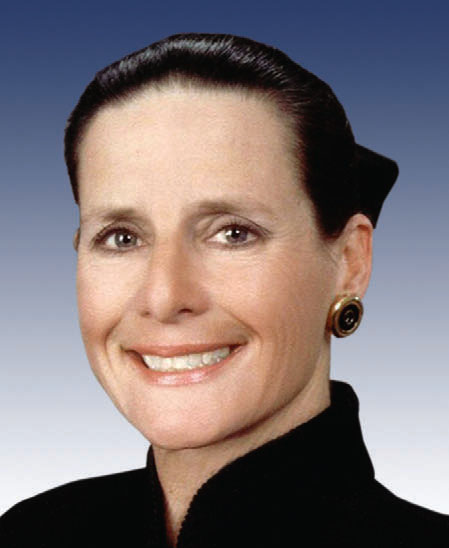
Former state representative Jean Schmidt, the Republican nominee, defeated Hackett in the special election.

Hackett criticized Schmidt as a "rubber stamp" for Governor Bob Taft's "failed policies", and claimed she would continue in that role for George W. Bush if elected. At their debate at Chatfield College, Hackett said, "If you think America is on the right track and we need more of the same, I'm not your candidate" and asked, "Are you better off today than you were five years ago?", echoing Ronald Reagan's question in his debate with Jimmy Carter in 1980.

A month before the election, the inspector general of the Ohio General Assembly announced he was investigating three legislators for accepting gifts and failing to report them. Schmidt was implicated, but could not be investigated because she was no longer a member of the Ohio house. On October 24, 2004, the legislators had accepted dinner at Nicola's Ristorante on Sycamore Street in Cincinnati's Over-the-Rhine neighborhood and Cincinnati Bengals tickets from a lobbyist for pharmaceutical company Chiron. Schmidt said she thought her $644 gift was from former Bengals player Boomer Esiason, who was, like Chiron, interested in cystic fibrosis. Schmidt repaid the lobbyist for the cost of the entertainment.

Hackett hammered on Schmidt's ethics. When she denied she knew or ever met Thomas Noe, at the center of the Coingate investment scandal at the Ohio Bureau of Workers' Compensation, Hackett produced minutes from a meeting of the Ohio Board of Regents that showed Schmidt had indeed met with Noe, once a regent. On July 29, the Toledo Blade reported on a 2001 e-mail from Taft's assistant Jon Allison complaining Schmidt was "bugging" him about setting up an Internet lottery for Cincinnati businessman Roger Ach, who gave her a $1,000 contribution the next year. Schmidt spokesman Fritz Wenzel said the candidate did not recall any conversations with the governor about Ach's business.

The candidates participated in two debates. The first was held on July 7 at Chatfield College in St. Martin in Brown County, moderated by Jack Atherton of WXIX-TV. The second debate was held July 26 at the Ohio Valley Career and Technical Center in West Union in Adams County. The two also made joint appearances on WCET-TV's Forum on July 28 and WKRC-TV's Newsmakers on July 31.

=== National attention on the race ===
Hackett attracted national attention to what had previously been considered a safe Republican seat, earning front-page coverage in The New York Times and prominent features in USA Today and The Washington Post. USA Today observed that if Democrats could design an ideal candidate to exploit public unease over the Iraq War, Hackett would fit the profile closely. Schmidt made the war a central theme of her campaign, praising the Bush administration's foreign policy and its democratic projects in the Middle East, and appearing at every public event with a lapel button bearing the photograph of Keith Matthew Maupin, the Iraq campaign's only prisoner of war. Hackett was equally direct, telling The New York Times that Bush was a "chicken hawk" who had dodged Vietnam-era service and calling him "the greatest threat to America". Numerous high-profile Democrats rallied for Hackett; James Carville headlined a Cincinnati fundraiser that raised $100,000; former senators Max Cleland and John Glenn campaigned alongside him; and retired general Wesley Clark endorsed him. Howard Dean generated over $475,000 in online contributions.

The campaign's closing weeks were marked by aggressive spending and pointed attacks from both parties. After Hackett told USA Today that he disliked "the son-of-a-bitch that lives in the White House" but would still lay down his life for him, the National Republican Congressional Committee announced it would spend $515,000 on television advertising across the district's two media markets, with spokesman Carl Forti saying the committee had decided "to bury him". NRCC ads accused Hackett of supporting tax increases, citing his Milford council record and selectively quoting a statement from his website; the Democratic Congressional Campaign Committee countered with ads highlighting Schmidt's votes to raise the sales and gasoline excise taxes in the Ohio legislature. A further complication arose when the Coalition Opposed to Additional Spending and Taxes founded by Tom Brinkman, whom Schmidt had defeated in the Republican primary, began running ads urging voters to skip the election entirely, with its president reasoning that it would be easier to unseat a Democrat the following year than an incumbent Republican "posing as a conservative".

=== Results and reactions ===
Ohio's 2nd congressional district special election, 2005
Party	Candidate	Votes	%	±%
Republican	Jean Schmidt	59,671	51.63	−20.07%
Democratic	Paul Hackett	55,886	48.35	+20.06%
Write-ins		19	0.02	N/A
Total votes		115,576	100.00	N/A
Republican hold				

Hackett ultimately lost by a narrow margin of 3.27 percent, the best showing of any Democrat in the district since 1974. Howard Wilkinson wrote in The Cincinnati Enquirer the morning after the election, "the fact that Paul Hackett made it a very close election is nothing short of astounding... com[ing] close to pulling off a monumental political upset." Hackett won in the eastern, rural counties of Pike, Scioto, Brown, and Adams, while Schmidt won in the populous western counties of Clermont, Hamilton, and Warren. The Cincinnati Post editorialized Hackett's success in the eastern counties was in part from "the increasingly desperate struggle in rural areas to provide enough decent jobs for those who want them." Hackett told The Cincinnati Post he stood by his criticisms of George W. Bush; "Meant it, said it, stand by it. I'd say it again. For every vote I may have lost because of it. I probably picked up one or two."

Following the election, many Democrats hailed the election as showing the weakness of Ohio's Republican party, which had been in control of Ohio state government for a decade, and public unhappiness with President Bush's policies. Hamilton County Democratic chairman Timothy Burke was delighted. "Paul was very critical of this president in a district that Bush carried easily last November, yet she barely hung on to win. There's a clear signal in that," he told The Cincinnati Post on election night. The Clermont County Democratic chairman, Dave Lane, told the Dayton Daily News "Here we are in the reddest of red districts and it was very, very close."

The Democratic Senatorial Campaign Committee claimed in a press release Hackett's strong showing meant trouble for Senator DeWine's re-election campaign in 2006, especially since his son Pat DeWine had lost the Republican primary for the seat. "If Ohio is a bellwether state for next year's midterm elections, things don't look too good for the Republicans", claimed the DSCC. Republicans said the election meant nothing of the sort. "There is no correlation between what happens in a special election, where turnout is very low and you have circumstances that just aren't comparable to an election that happens on an Election Day in an election year," Brian Nick of the National Republican Senatorial Committee told The Cincinnati Post.

The Columbus Dispatch referred to "the trauma of barely winning a Congressional district long dominated by Republicans" and quoted an anonymous source in the Republican party claiming "there is not a tougher environment in the country than Ohio right now. There is kind of a meltdown happening." Amy Walter of the Cook Political Report told the Dispatch "Ohio becomes the microcosm for the debate Democrats are trying to have nationally" and Democrats would argue in future campaigns "'See what happens when one party rules too long, see what happens with corruption and insider influence.'" Her boss, Charlie Cook, told The Los Angeles Times Hackett's "rubber stamp" charge had resonated with Ohio voters.

Peter W. Bronson, a conservative columnist for The Cincinnati Enquirer, wrote, "Hackett's surprising finish was less a repudiation of Bush than a repudiation of Governor Bob Taft, whose name is now officially radioactive poison." Bronson admitted Hackett "ran a strong campaign" but said he did so well only because of "the ugly primary" on the Republican side, fears that Schmidt was "another Taft RINO" (i.e., "Republican In Name Only"), and apathy by Republican voters, not dissatisfaction with Bush or Republicans in general.

John Nichols of The Capital Times saw it differently. "The district had been so radically gerrymandered by Republican governors and legislators that it was all but unrecognizable that a Democrat could ever be competitive there" and Hackett, "a smart telegenic Iraq war veteran," had been "swift-boated" in the final days of the campaign by Republican operatives and "right-wing talk hosts" such as Rush Limbaugh.

Mark Steyn, a conservative columnist for National Review magazine, wrote in the Irish Times, "Paul Hackett was like a fast-forward version of the John Kerry campaign" who "artfully neglected to mention the candidate was a Democrat." Steyn claimed any Democratic efforts to present Hackett's run as a success for the party were absurd. Jerome Armstrong stated in TomPaine.com that the returns tapped into the growing movement within the Democratic Party willing to take the Republicans head on about the direction of this nation.

Former President Bill Clinton recognized Hackett in an October 23, 2006, speech saying "I hope Paul Hackett sees that his courage to make people see the truth about our policy in Iraq, is now sweeping the nation."

== 2006 United States Senate election ==
On October 24, 2005, Hackett announced he would seek the Democratic nomination to challenge incumbent United States Senator Mike DeWine after rejecting a second run against Schmidt. Initially, Congressman Sherrod Brown had rejected efforts by the Democratic Senatorial Campaign Committee to recruit him to the race in the summer of 2005. By October, however, Brown changed his mind and declared he would run, shortly after Hackett stated he would announce his candidacy. One issue Hackett faced in his campaign was the status of his Marine Corps Reserve unit possibly returning to Iraq during the campaign. Hackett had said he expected to return to Iraq in 2006.

On February 13, 2006, Hackett announced that he was withdrawing from the race and ending his political career. Hackett told The New York Times that Senate Minority Leader Harry Reid and New York Senator Chuck Schumer had asked him to withdraw. He further contends that Schumer sabotaged his fundraising efforts and actively worked against his campaign. Hackett said, "For me, this is a second betrayal ... first, my government misused and mismanaged the military in Iraq, and now my own party is afraid to support candidates like me." On March 14, 2006, he appeared on an episode of The Daily Show on a segment which satirized the mainstream Democratic Party's criticism of Hackett.

Hackett later reconciled with Brown and backed his campaign, which was successful. Following his exit from the senate race, Hackett again declined to enter the race for the Democratic nomination in the 2nd congressional district against Schmidt, despite speculation that he would run.

== Post-campaign activities ==
After withdrawing from the senate race, Hackett joined the Advisory Board of Iraq and Afghanistan Veterans of America political action committee to support fellow veterans running for congress. Hackett also substituted for Jerry Springer on his Air America Radio show, Springer on the Radio, as well as for Ed Schultz on The Ed Schultz Show.

On May 30, 2006, Hackett filed a class action lawsuit against the United States Department of Veterans Affairs over the compromise of personal information of 26.5 million veterans which may have fallen into the hands of a thief.

Hackett was the defense counsel for Marine Corps Sergeant Ryan Weemer, who was charged with the killing of unarmed Iraqi detainees during the Second Battle of Fallujah. Following the trial, Weemer was acquitted of all charges on April 9, 2009.

== See also ==
- Ohio's 2nd congressional district
- 2006 United States Senate election in Ohio
- VoteVets.org
