= 2006 Ohio gubernatorial election =

- November 7, 2006
- Turnout: 53.25% (registered voters) ▲6.07pp
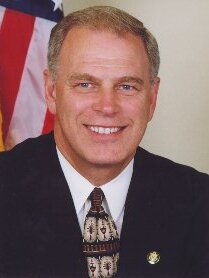

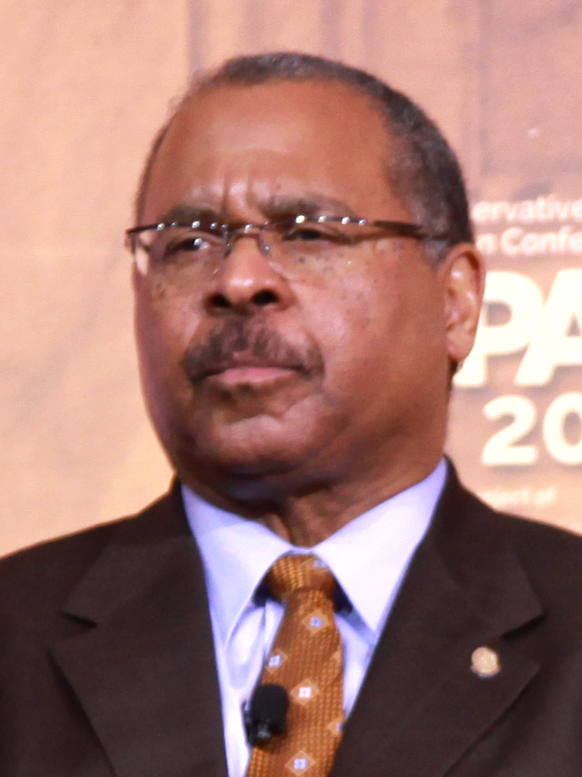
Nominee	Ted Strickland	Ken Blackwell
Party	Democratic	Republican
Running mate	Lee Fisher	Tom Raga
Popular vote	2,435,505	1,474,331
Percentage	60.54%	36.65%
- Strickland: 40–50% 50–60% 60–70% 70–80% 80–90% Blackwell: 40–50% 50–60% 60–70%
Governor before election
Bob Taft
Republican
Elected Governor
Ted Strickland
Democratic

The 2006 Ohio gubernatorial election was held on November 7, 2006, and was a race for the governor and lieutenant governor of Ohio. Because Ohio governors are limited to two consecutive terms in office, incumbent Governor Bob Taft was barred from running for re-election. The election was held concurrently with a U.S. Senate election. The general election for governor pitted Ohio Secretary of State Ken Blackwell, the Republican nominee, against United States Congressman Ted Strickland of Ohio's 6th congressional district, the Democratic nominee. Their running mates were former Ohio Attorney General Lee Fisher on the Democratic ticket and State Representative Tom Raga on the Republican ticket.

In the end, the contest was not close, and Strickland captured more than 60% of the vote, giving him a solid 24-point margin of victory. Strickland was declared the winner right at 7:30 P.M. EST, when the polls closed in Ohio. Blackwell called Strickland and conceded defeat at 8:45 P.M. EST.

Strickland won most areas of the state. In particular, he trounced Blackwell in eastern Ohio, with Blackwell only carrying one county in this region (Holmes). Blackwell did well in the Cincinnati suburbs, although he only won Hamilton County, which encompasses the City of Cincinnati, by just about 2,000 votes. He did win some rural western counties as well, but Strickland defeated Blackwell in Cuyahoga County and Franklin County, home of Cleveland and Columbus respectively. Strickland also performed strongly in the Rust Belt area from Cleveland all the way to Toledo, as well as in the Akron-Youngstown Area.

This would turn out to be one of the most expensive gubernatorial elections in Ohio's history. Until Amy Acton won in 2026, this was the last time that a Democrat was elected governor of Ohio, and the only time between 1986 and 2026, as well as the first time that an African American (Blackwell) was the major party nominee for governor of Ohio.

== Historical background ==
=== National attention ===
As the election approached, there was increasing national attention on the Ohio gubernatorial election, focused largely on the ability of the Republican party to maintain control in Ohio. Results in Ohio in 2006 were regarded as a possible bellwether for the 2008 presidential election; Ohio was considered a crucial swing state, with 20 electoral votes. Since the Republican Party's inception in 1854, no Republican presidential candidate has ever been elected to office without the electoral votes of Ohio. In contrast, a Democratic candidate has won the national election without the support of Ohio eight times (1836, 1844, 1856, 1884, 1892, 1944, 1960, and 2020). Overall, Ohio's electoral votes have gone to the winner of the election 78% of the time.

Comedian and talk-show host Jon Stewart taped The Daily Show from October 30 to November 2, 2006, at the Roy Bowen Theater on the campus of Ohio State University. The series of episodes was entitled "Battlefield Ohio: The Daily Show's Midwest Midterm Midtacular" and was intended to bring further national attention to the election in Ohio. This was only the second time that the show had been filmed in a location other than New York City.

=== Ohio, Blackwell, and the 2004 election ===
Ohio played a decisive role in the 2004 presidential election, as Ohio's electoral votes would have been sufficient to swing the election from George W. Bush to John Kerry had Kerry won in Ohio. Given the importance of the state, Blackwell's role in the conduct of the election was closely scrutinized. As Ohio secretary of state, Blackwell was the state's chief elections officer. He was also an honorary co-chair for the Bush re-election campaign in Ohio and the most prominent backer of a ballot measure to ban same-sex marriage on the same ballot.

Leading up to the election Blackwell made a number of decisions about the election process, most of which placed additional restrictions on voting. Opponents argued that Blackwell's decisions would have the effect of suppressing turnout among vulnerable populations, most of whom would be expected to vote for Kerry in the presidential contest—and that Blackwell had a conflict of interest as a co-chair of Bush's re-election campaign. Supporters argued that the Secretary of State had always been a partisan political office and that there was nothing wrong with Blackwell having a preference in the presidential elections; they denied that Blackwell's decisions were designed to benefit Bush.

Reaction to Blackwell's conduct was so strong that a coalition of left-leaning organizations attempted to amend the Ohio Constitution to abolish the Secretary of State's oversight of elections, as part of a package of election reforms. The proposal was rejected by voters in November 2005. Dissatisfaction with Blackwell's involvement in the 2004 election apparently hurt him with Ohio's African-American community; according to exit polls, Blackwell received only 20% of the African-American vote in 2006. Exit polls showed that confidence in the election process among Ohio voters was even lower than voters in Florida, the state which produced an unprecedented five-week post-election fight in 2000. However, among voters who were "very confident" that votes would be counted accurately, Blackwell actually led Strickland.

=== Republican control ===
Entering the 2006 campaign, Ohio had been dominated for a decade by Republicans. Republicans had held the governorship for sixteen years, occupied all statewide constitutional offices, and controlled both houses of the state legislature.

=== Important scandals ===
==== Bob Taft ====
At a low point in his popularity in November 2005, Taft garnered only a 6.5% approval rating. According to polling organization Survey USA, this was a lower proportion than any governor in the United States. A poll taken in May 2006 indicated that only 2% of Ohio residents "strongly approved" of Taft's performance. The low approval ratings led pollster John Zogby to comment, "I'm not aware of anyone who's ever sunk lower."

Taft's low approval ratings follow several years of scandals. In 2005, Taft pleaded no contest to four ethics violations involving illegal gifts totaling $5,800. He was convicted of four misdemeanors and was ordered to pay a $4,000 fine and apologize to the people of Ohio. Taft is the only Ohio governor to be convicted of a crime while in office.

==== Thomas Noe and Coingate ====
In 1996 the Republican controlled Ohio General Assembly removed a restriction requiring that state investments only be in safer, though lower-yielding, bonds. After the restriction was eliminated, hundreds of millions of dollars in state funds were invested by a number of investment firms with close ties to the Republican party. Among those investments was $50 million of the Ohio Bureau of Workers' Compensation fund which was given to Thomas Noe, an investor in rare and unusual coins and major donor to the Republican Party including then-governor Bob Taft.

In 2005 it was revealed that Noe could only account for $13 million of the original investment. Among the missing funds were two coins worth over $300,000 alone. Throughout 2005, there was a protracted legal battle over the release of records which Noe claimed were privileged and prosecutors claimed were in the public domain. The Ohio Supreme Court ruled 5–2 in favor of the prosecutors. On February 13, 2006, Noe was indicted on 53 counts, including: engaging in a pattern of corrupt activity (which carries a mandatory 10-year sentence), 11 counts of theft, 11 counts of money laundering, 8 counts of tampering with records, and 22 counts of forgery. The charges also accuse Noe of personally stealing $2 million. On November 20, 2006, Noe was found guilty of theft, money laundering, forgery and corrupt activity, and was sentenced to serve 18 years in prison, fined $213,000, ordered to pay the $2 million cost of his prosecution and make restitution to the Ohio Bureau of Worker's Compensation.

Also in 2006, Noe pleaded guilty to three charges of using over a dozen people in 2004 as illegal "conduits" to make donations to George W. Bush's re-election campaign of over $45,000 in order to skirt laws limiting donations in federal campaigns to $2,000. Noe was convicted and sentenced to 27 months in federal prison and ordered to pay a $136,000 fine.

== Democratic primary ==
=== Candidates ===
- Bryan Flannery, former state representative and nominee for Ohio secretary of state in 2002
- Ted Strickland, U.S. representative

=== Campaign ===
When Strickland first launched his campaign, he was originally also in a tough fight for the nomination, as Columbus Mayor Michael Coleman was also campaigning and raising money. Before attacks were traded between the nominees, Coleman bowed out, citing a need to spend more time with his family.

=== Results ===
Primary results by county: Strickland: 50–60%; 60–70%; 70–80%; 80–90%; 90–100%

Democratic primary results
Party	Candidate	Votes	%
Democratic	Ted Strickland	634,114	79.23
Democratic	Bryan Flannery	166,253	20.77
Total votes		800,367	100.00

== Republican primary ==
=== Candidates ===
- Ken Blackwell, Ohio secretary of state and nominee for OH-01 in 1990
- Jim Petro, attorney general of Ohio

=== Campaign ===
Blackwell and Petro were initially going to be joined in their competitive primary by Ohio State Auditor Betty Montgomery, but Montgomery withdrew from the contest and instead ran for state attorney general, an office she lost. The campaign between the two candidates then heated up; despite commercials preaching his conservative values, Petro was never able to shake his previous pro-choice stance. As the election approached, the barbs grew worse between Petro and Blackwell, only serving to bring more negative attention to the Ohio Republican Party.

=== Results ===
Results map by county Blackwell—50–60% Blackwell—60–70% Blackwell—70–80% Petro—50–60% Petro—60–70%

Republican primary results
Party	Candidate	Votes	%
Republican	Ken Blackwell	460,349	55.73
Republican	Jim Petro	365,618	44.27
Total votes		825,967	100.00

== General election ==
=== Campaign finance ===
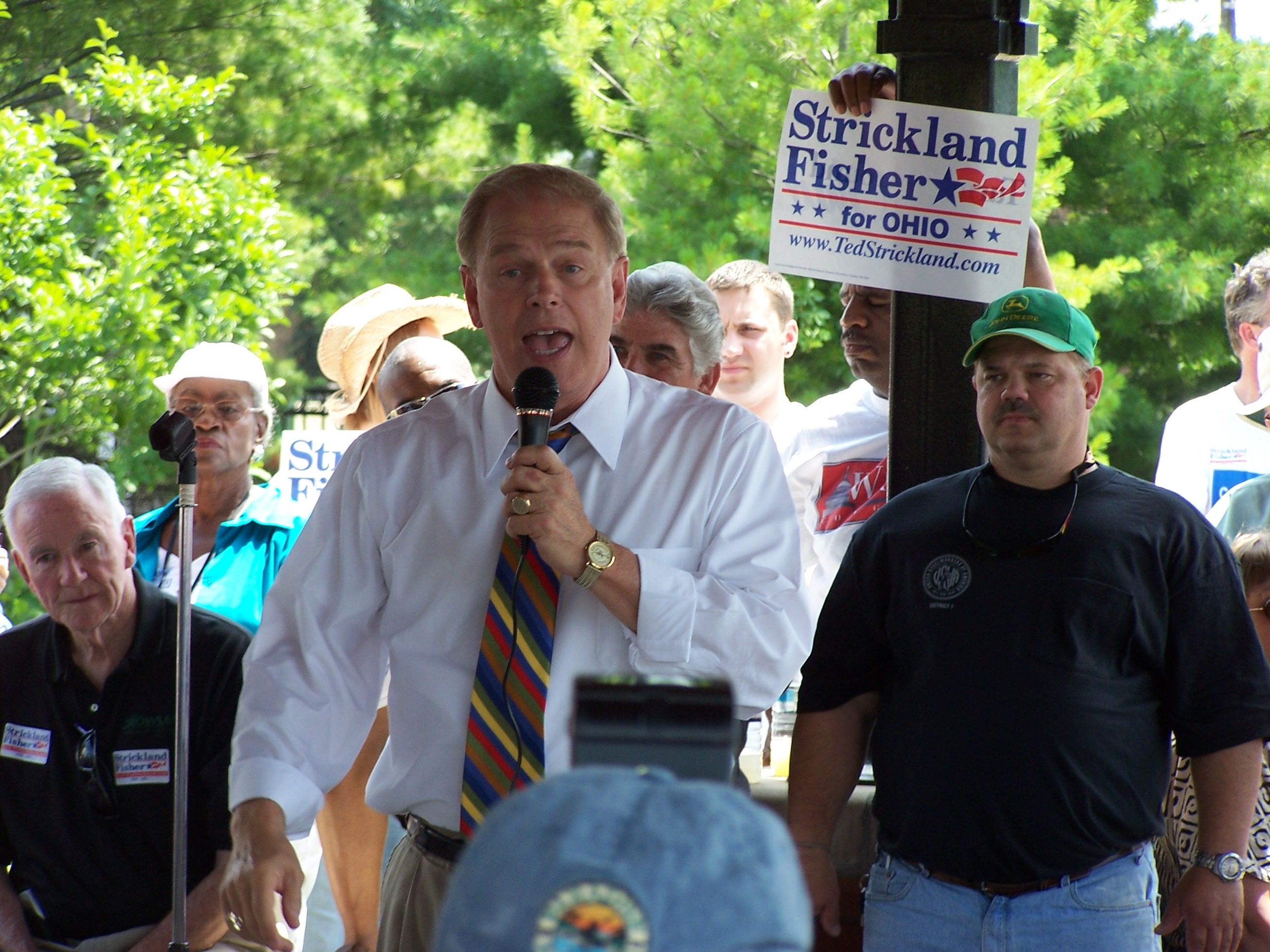
Ted Strickland campaigning before the election

The race for the 2006 election was the most expensive in Ohio's history. Reflective of both the national significance of the race, as well as the powerful fundraising capabilities of both parties, Blackwell and Strickland passed the previous fundraising record set in 1998. That record, set when current Governor Bob Taft was running against Lee Fisher (Strickland's running mate), totaled a combined $18 million by the end of the election. As of September 9, 2006, Blackwell and Strickland had already raised a combined $21.2 million. Strickland led Blackwell, $11.2 million to $10 million. Most of the money raised in Ohio by both major party candidates came from a single zip code in downtown Columbus, which is home to their respective parties, labor and political groups, lobbyists and lawyers.

A significant amount of money was spent by private groups on behalf of the candidates as well, the estimated combined total at the time of the May 2 primary was $50 million.

=== Predictions ===
Source	Ranking	As of
The Cook Political Report	Solid D (flip)	November 6, 2006
Sabato's Crystal Ball	Safe D (flip)	November 6, 2006
Rothenberg Political Report	Likely D (flip)	November 2, 2006
Real Clear Politics	Likely D (flip)	November 6, 2006

=== Polling ===
Graph of average poll results, Nov 2005 - Oct 2006

Since the first polls on the general election matchup were taken in November 2005, Strickland led Blackwell, though the margin substantially increased in March 2006.

The greatest margin recorded in an individual poll was found in the October 26, 2006, SurveyUSA poll which showed Strickland leading by 30 points. The smallest recorded margin was the February 6, 2006, Zogby poll showing Strickland leading by a mere 3 points. When the results are averaged across the different polls, the greatest margin was in October 2006 with a difference of 22.6 points in favor of Strickland. The smallest average margin was during January 2006, with Strickland leading Blackwell by 4 points.

Poll source	Date(s) administered	Ted Strickland (D)	Ken Blackwell (R)	Bill Peirce (L)	Bob Fitrakis (G)
Survey USA	November 6, 2006	55%	38%	2%	1%
University of Cincinnati	November 6, 2006	59%	37%	4% (Independents combined)	
CNN	October 31, 2006	59%	36%		
Survey USA	October 26, 2006	62%	32%	1%	1%
Quinnipiac	October 18, 2006	59%	32%		
NY Times/CBS News	October 18, 2006	53%	29%	2% (Independents combined)	
University of Cincinnati	October 14, 2006	52%	38%	3%	1%
Survey USA	October 12, 2006	60%	32%	2%	1%
Rasmussen	October 6, 2006	52%	40%		
Zogby	September 28, 2006	48.3%	39.7%		
Survey USA	September 28, 2006	56%	35%	2%	2%
Rasmussen	September 20, 2006	54%	35%		
Quinnipiac	September 19, 2006	56%	34%		
University of Cincinnati	September 17, 2006	50%	38%	3%	2%
Zogby	September 11, 2006	47.5%	41.8%		
Zogby	August 28, 2006	49.7%	41.4%		
Rasmussen	August 27, 2006	57%	32%		
Survey USA	August 7, 2006	57%	35%	2%	1%
Rasmussen	August 1, 2006	50%	39%		
Zogby	July 24, 2006	48.4%	43.8%		
Columbus Dispatch	July 23, 2006	47%	27%		
Rasmussen	June 27, 2006	50%	37%		
Zogby	June 21, 2006	49.1%	44.3%		
Survey USA	June 13, 2006	53%	37%	2%	1%
University of Cincinnati	May 25, 2006	50%	44%	2% (Independents combined)	
Rasmussen	May 18, 2006	52%	36%		
Rasmussen	April 25, 2006	52%	35%		
Rasmussen	March 31, 2006	50%	40%		
Rasmussen	February 19, 2006	47%	35%		
Zogby	February 6, 2006	38%	35%		
Rasmussen	January 7, 2006	44%	40%		
Rasmussen	November 15, 2005	42%	36%		

=== Results ===
Ohio gubernatorial election, 2006
Party	Candidate	Votes	%	±%
Democratic	Ted Strickland	2,435,505	60.54%	+22.23%
Republican	Ken Blackwell	1,474,331	36.65%	−21.11%
Libertarian	Bill Peirce	71,473	1.78%	
Green	Bob Fitrakis	40,967	1.02%	
Write-in		652	0.02%	
Majority		961,174	23.89%	+4.44%
Turnout		4,022,928	53.25%	
Democratic gain from Republican		Swing		

=== Results by county ===
County	Ted Strickland Democratic		Ken Blackwell Republican		Various candidates Other parties		Margin		Total
County	#	%	#	%	#	%	#	%	Total
Adams	4,725	54.40%	3,771	43.42%	189	2.18%	954	10.98%	8,685
Allen	18,000	49.68%	17,184	47.43%	1,045	2.88%	816	2.25%	36,229
Ashland	9,492	49.04%	9,154	47.30%	709	3.66%	338	1.75%	19,355
Ashtabula	22,255	65.72%	10,406	30.73%	1,204	3.56%	11,849	34.99%	33,865
Athens	16,188	81.59%	3,303	16.65%	349	1.76%	12,885	64.94%	19,840
Auglaize	7,606	44.99%	8,687	51.38%	614	3.63%	-1,081	-6.39%	16,907
Belmont	17,842	74.35%	5,593	23.31%	561	2.34%	12,249	51.05%	23,996
Brown	7,743	55.13%	5,956	42.41%	345	2.46%	1,787	12.72%	14,044
Butler	52,365	45.18%	60,018	51.79%	3,512	3.03%	-7,653	-6.60%	115,895
Carroll	6,948	61.91%	3,775	33.64%	500	4.45%	3,173	28.27%	11,223
Champaign	7,475	52.40%	6,355	44.55%	434	3.04%	1,120	7.85%	14,264
Clark	29,364	59.86%	18,200	37.10%	1,492	3.04%	11,164	22.76%	49,056
Clermont	27,307	42.00%	35,687	54.89%	2,016	3.10%	-8,380	-12.89%	65,010
Clinton	6,342	50.15%	5,947	47.03%	357	2.82%	395	3.12%	12,646
Columbiana	23,914	66.02%	11,326	31.27%	983	2.71%	12,588	34.75%	36,223
Coshocton	7,754	57.83%	5,184	38.66%	470	3.51%	2,570	19.17%	13,408
Crawford	8,287	49.49%	7,863	46.96%	594	3.55%	424	2.53%	16,744
Cuyahoga	335,382	73.84%	107,258	23.61%	11,563	2.55%	228,124	50.23%	454,203
Darke	9,365	46.31%	10,018	49.54%	840	4.15%	-653	-3.23%	20,223
Defiance	6,798	49.85%	6,298	46.18%	542	3.97%	500	3.67%	13,638
Delaware	32,504	50.18%	30,931	47.75%	1,338	2.07%	1,573	2.43%	64,773
Erie	20,256	67.28%	9,089	30.19%	761	2.53%	11,167	37.09%	30,106
Fairfield	30,180	55.88%	22,363	41.41%	1,461	2.71%	7,817	14.47%	54,004
Fayette	4,384	52.18%	3,845	45.76%	173	2.06%	539	6.42%	8,402
Franklin	241,536	64.71%	122,601	32.85%	9,121	2.44%	118,935	31.86%	373,258
Fulton	8,193	50.76%	7,421	45.98%	527	3.26%	772	4.78%	16,141
Gallia	6,574	64.67%	3,406	33.51%	185	1.82%	3,168	31.17%	10,165
Geauga	22,154	56.59%	15,850	40.49%	1,144	2.92%	6,304	16.10%	39,148
Greene	28,612	48.40%	28,713	48.57%	1,788	3.02%	-101	-0.17%	59,113
Guernsey	8,350	62.43%	4,601	34.40%	424	3.17%	3,749	28.03%	13,375
Hamilton	139,451	48.51%	141,374	49.17%	6,671	2.32%	-1,923	-0.67%	287,496
Hancock	10,934	42.59%	14,007	54.56%	734	2.86%	-3,073	-11.97%	25,675
Hardin	5,273	54.23%	4,099	42.16%	351	3.61%	1,174	12.07%	9,723
Harrison	4,238	69.53%	1,661	27.25%	196	3.22%	2,577	42.28%	6,095
Henry	5,723	49.88%	5,371	46.81%	379	3.30%	352	3.07%	11,473
Highland	7,007	53.25%	5,822	44.25%	329	2.50%	1,185	9.01%	13,158
Hocking	6,619	67.13%	2,990	30.32%	251	2.55%	3,629	36.81%	9,860
Holmes	3,301	40.71%	4,514	55.67%	293	3.61%	-1,213	-14.96%	8,108
Huron	10,718	56.66%	7,592	40.13%	607	3.21%	3,126	16.52%	18,917
Jackson	7,117	68.28%	3,150	30.22%	156	1.50%	3,967	38.06%	10,423
Jefferson	18,071	69.15%	7,187	27.50%	875	3.35%	10,884	41.65%	26,133
Knox	10,278	49.46%	9,944	47.85%	558	2.69%	334	1.61%	20,780
Lake	56,482	64.18%	28,675	32.58%	2,849	3.24%	27,807	31.60%	88,006
Lawrence	13,530	70.80%	5,287	27.67%	292	1.53%	8,243	43.14%	19,109
Licking	32,455	54.96%	24,740	41.90%	1,856	3.14%	7,715	13.06%	59,051
Logan	7,611	47.33%	7,941	49.38%	528	3.28%	-330	-2.05%	16,080
Lorain	68,783	68.35%	28,342	28.16%	3,507	3.48%	40,441	40.19%	100,632
Lucas	95,118	66.62%	44,307	31.03%	3,359	2.35%	50,811	35.59%	142,784
Madison	7,244	53.89%	5,815	43.26%	382	2.84%	1,429	10.63%	13,441
Mahoning	72,076	75.67%	20,356	21.37%	2,819	2.96%	51,720	54.30%	95,251
Marion	11,963	55.15%	9,054	41.74%	674	3.11%	2,909	13.41%	21,691
Medina	39,061	59.63%	24,629	37.60%	1,821	2.78%	14,432	22.03%	65,511
Meigs	5,295	68.70%	2,285	29.65%	127	1.65%	3,010	39.06%	7,707
Mercer	5,692	36.38%	9,429	60.26%	525	3.36%	-3,737	-23.88%	15,646
Miami	17,263	46.59%	18,395	49.64%	1,396	3.77%	-1,132	-3.06%	37,054
Monroe	4,682	77.18%	1,237	20.39%	147	2.42%	3,445	56.79%	6,066
Montgomery	107,593	56.87%	76,189	40.27%	5,419	2.86%	31,404	16.60%	189,201
Morgan	3,468	62.87%	1,876	34.01%	172	3.12%	1,592	28.86%	5,516
Morrow	6,425	51.09%	5,668	45.07%	482	3.83%	757	6.02%	12,575
Muskingum	16,733	58.26%	11,073	38.56%	913	3.18%	5,660	19.71%	28,719
Noble	3,342	65.89%	1,583	31.21%	147	2.90%	1,759	34.68%	5,072
Ottawa	10,858	63.10%	5,809	33.76%	540	3.14%	5,049	29.34%	17,207
Paulding	3,717	49.70%	3,276	43.80%	486	6.50%	441	5.90%	7,479
Perry	7,371	65.28%	3,577	31.68%	343	3.04%	3,794	33.60%	11,291
Pickaway	10,609	59.07%	6,953	38.71%	398	2.22%	3,656	20.36%	17,960
Pike	7,118	72.81%	2,511	25.69%	147	1.50%	4,607	47.13%	9,776
Portage	36,553	66.50%	16,223	29.51%	2,194	3.99%	20,330	36.98%	54,970
Preble	7,863	50.56%	7,096	45.62%	594	3.82%	767	4.93%	15,553
Putnam	6,439	45.47%	7,248	51.18%	474	3.35%	-809	-5.71%	14,161
Richland	24,398	53.27%	19,855	43.35%	1,546	3.38%	4,543	9.92%	45,799
Ross	15,930	66.82%	7,452	31.26%	457	1.92%	8,478	35.56%	23,839
Sandusky	13,473	59.26%	8,467	37.24%	796	3.50%	5,006	22.02%	22,736
Scioto	19,784	75.03%	6,328	24.00%	257	0.97%	13,456	51.03%	26,369
Seneca	11,387	56.79%	8,011	39.95%	653	3.26%	3,376	16.84%	20,051
Shelby	8,061	47.34%	8,358	49.08%	610	3.58%	-297	-1.74%	17,029
Stark	89,416	64.14%	45,413	32.57%	4,585	3.29%	44,003	31.56%	139,414
Summit	135,147	68.34%	57,344	29.00%	5,256	2.66%	77,803	39.34%	197,747
Trumbull	60,161	74.16%	18,556	22.87%	2,411	2.97%	41,605	51.28%	81,128
Tuscarawas	20,556	65.08%	10,134	32.08%	895	2.83%	10,422	33.00%	31,585
Union	7,689	45.56%	8,613	51.03%	575	3.41%	-924	-5.47%	16,877
Van Wert	4,514	43.37%	5,331	51.22%	564	5.42%	-817	-7.85%	10,409
Vinton	3,165	71.57%	1,166	26.37%	91	2.06%	1,999	45.21%	4,422
Warren	27,434	40.29%	39,094	57.41%	1,563	2.30%	-11,660	-17.12%	68,091
Washington	15,037	65.99%	7,412	32.53%	339	1.49%	7,625	33.46%	22,788
Wayne	19,820	51.42%	17,504	45.41%	1,222	3.17%	2,316	6.01%	38,546
Williams	6,696	51.38%	5,853	44.91%	484	3.71%	843	6.47%	13,033
Wood	26,771	58.69%	17,500	38.36%	1,345	2.95%	9,271	20.32%	45,616
Wyandot	4,097	50.21%	3,852	47.21%	211	2.59%	245	3.00%	8,160
Totals	2,435,505	60.54%	1,474,331	36.65%	113,092	2.81%	961,174	23.89%	4,022,928

==== Counties that flipped from Republican to Democratic ====
- Sandusky (largest city: Fremont)
- Seneca (largest city: Tiffin)
- Huron (largest city: Norwalk)
- Lake (largest city: Mentor)
- Portage (largest city: Kent)
- Stark (largest city: Canton)
- Columbiana (largest city: Salem)
- Carroll (largest city: Carrollton)
- Tuscarawas (largest city: New Philadelphia)
- Guernsey (largest city: Cambridge)
- Clark (largest municipality: Springfield)
- Gallia (largest city: Gallipolis)
- Adams (largest city: West Union)
- Ashland (largest city: Ashland)
- Allen (largest city: Lima)
- Champaign (largest city: Urbana)
- Brown (largest city: Georgetown)
- Clinton (largest city: Wilmington)
- Coshocton (largest city: Coshocton)
- Crawford (largest city: Bucyrus)
- Delaware (largest city: Delaware)
- Defiance (largest city: Defiance)
- Fairfield (largest city: Lancaster)
- Fayette (largest city: Washington Court House)
- Fulton (largest city: Wauseon)
- Geauga (largest city: Chardon)
- Highland (largest city: Hillsboro)
- Hardin (largest city: Kenton)
- Henry (largest city: Napoleon)
- Knox (largest city: Mount Vernon)
- Licking (largest city: Newark)
- Madison (largest city: London)
- Marion (largest city: Marion)
- Medina (largest city: Medina)
- Morgan (largest city: McConnelsville)
- Morrow (largest city: Mount Gilead)
- Muskingum (largest city: Zanesville)
- Perry (largest city: New Lexington)
- Pickaway (largest city: Circleville)
- Preble (largest city: Eaton)
- Richland (largest city: Mansfield)
- Wayne (largest city: Wooster)
- Williams (largest city: Bryan)
- Wyandot (largest city: Upper Sandusky)
- Harrison (largest city: Cadiz)
- Hocking (largest city: Logan)
- Jackson (largest city: Jackson)
- Lawrence (largest city: Ironton)
- Meigs (largest city: Middleport)
- Noble (largest city: Caldwell)
- Ottawa (largest city: Port Clinton)
- Perry (largest city: New Lexington)
- Pike (largest city: Waverly)
- Ross (largest city: Chillicothe)
- Scioto (largest city: Portsmouth)
- Vinton (largest city: McArthur)
- Wood (largest city: Bowling Green)
- Belmont (largest city: Martins Ferry)
- Jefferson (largest city: Steubenville)
- Ashtabula (largest city: Ashtabula)
- Erie (largest city: Sandusky)
- Montgomery (largest city: Dayton)
- Wood (largest city: Bowling Green)
- Franklin (largest city: Columbus)
- Lucas (largest city: Toledo)
- Washington (largest city: Marietta)
- Monroe (largest city: Woodsfield)

=== By congressional district ===
Strickland won 16 of 18 congressional districts, including nine which elected Republicans to the House.

District	Strickland	Blackwell	Representative
1st	49.7%	47.9%	Steve Chabot
2nd	47.4%	50.4%	
2nd	47.4%	50.4%	Jean Schmidt
3rd	54.0%	43.4%	Mike Turner
4th	49.9%	46.9%	Mike Oxley (109th Congress)
4th	49.9%	46.9%	Jim Jordan (110th Congress)
5th	53.2%	43.2%	Paul Gillmor
6th	70.2%	27.4%	Ted Strickland (109th Congress)
6th	70.2%	27.4%	Charlie Wilson (110th Congress)
7th	59.0%	38.3%	Dave Hobson
8th	47.1%	49.6%	John Boehner
9th	66.9%	30.5%	Marcy Kaptur
10th	71.1%	26.1%	Dennis Kucinich
11th	80.8%	16.9%	Stephanie Tubbs Jones
12th	58.4%	39.4%	Pat Tiberi
13th	67.6%	29.5%	Sherrod Brown (109th Congress)
13th	67.6%	29.5%	Betty Sutton (110th Congress)
14th	62.8%	34.3%	Steve LaTourette
15th	61.9%	35.6%	Deborah Pryce
16th	59.9%	36.9%	Ralph Regula
17th	74.0%	22.9%	Tim Ryan
18th	61.4%	35.7%	Bob Ney (109th Congress)
18th	61.4%	35.7%	Zack Space (110th Congress)

== See also ==
- Coingate scandal
