= Ryan Weemer =

Recipient of the Purple Heart medal

Ryan G. Weemer
- Military career
- Allegiance: United States
- Branch: United States Marine Corps
- Service years: 2001–2006
- Rank: Sergeant
- Unit: 3rd Battalion 1st Marines
- Awards: Purple Heart; Navy and Marine Corps Commendation Medal with Combat Distinguishing Device

Ryan G. Weemer is a Marine Veteran from Hindsboro, Illinois, who was tried in a military court for war crimes that were allegedly committed while he was on active duty during the Iraq War. Weemer was charged with the killing of unarmed Iraqi detainees in the city of Fallujah. His trial began on March 31, 2009, at Camp Pendleton in California. He was acquitted of all charges on April 9, 2009.

== Background ==
Weemer attended Oakland High School in Oakland, Illinois, where he was captain of the school's football team and salutatorian of his class. After graduation in 2001, he joined the United States Marine Corps, eventually rising to the rank of sergeant. During his time in the Marines, Weemer was a member of the 3rd Battalion 1st Marines and served in the Iraq War. In November 2004, he participated in a fierce battle in Fallujah, during which Weemer was wounded. He was subsequently awarded the Purple Heart and a Navy and Marine Corps Commendation Medal for his valor under fire. Weemer was honorably discharged from active service in 2006.

Subsequently, he applied for a job with the Secret Service and, during the interview process, Weemer mentioned the Fallujah killings. Because of this, he was recalled to active duty so that he could be made to stand trial in a military court-martial.

In court-martial proceedings at Camp Pendleton that opened on March 31, 2009, Sgt. Weemer was accused of unpremeditated murder and dereliction of duty in the fatal shooting of four Iraqi prisoners during the November 2004 battle in Fallujah. Weemer's jury consisted of a panel of eight Marines, each of whom had served in either Iraq or Afghanistan. The jury deliberated for seven hours over two days, and Weemer was acquitted of all charges on April 9, 2009. Weemer, age 26, hugged and thanked his attorney Paul Hackett after the verdict as his wife, sister, and former high school teacher wept in the courtroom.

Two other members of Weemer's battalion, Sgt. Jose Nazario and Sgt. Jermaine Nelson, were also similarly charged for their roles in the Fallujah incident. Nazario was accused of charges that included his allegedly ordering Weemer and Nelson to kill prisoners. Nazario was acquitted in August 2008. In September 2009, Nelson pleaded guilty to dereliction of duty in exchange for an honorable discharge. During Nazario's trial, both Weemer and Nelson refused to testify against their former squad leader. Both men were jailed for contempt of court. After Nazario's acquittal, however, a federal judge dismissed the contempt charges against them.

After his trial ended, Weemer moved back to Kentucky with his wife. He worked for a non-profit organization as a primary counselor for chemically dependent and homeless veterans while completing his B.A. in psychology from the University of Louisville. He moved to New York City in 2012 and accepted a position with Iraq and Afghanistan Veterans of America.

Weemer's continuous commitment to veteran causes led him to start his own non-profit. In 2013, he co-founded War Writers' Campaign, an organization whose mission is to promote social change surrounding veteran's issues through written awareness. Weemer is CEO as well as board member. In May 2016, Weemer received a Masters of Public Administration from Baruch College in New York City. He was awarded a 2016 Presidential Management Fellowship—a prestigious two-year training and development program with a United States government agency—and accepted a position with United States Citizenship and Immigration Services.

== See also ==
- Second Battle of Fallujah
