= Amy's Law (Ohio) =

Ohio State Legislature
- Full name: An Act to amend section 2919.251 of the Revised Code to require a person who is charged with an offense of violence involving a victim who is a family or household member and to whom any of a list of specified circumstances applies to appear before the court before the court sets bail for that person and to require the court to consider certain factors before setting bail for that person if the court is aware of certain specified information.
- Introduced: February 2, 2005
- House voted: April 27, 2005 (98-0)
- Senate voted: May 4, 2005 (30-0)
- Signed into law: May 25, 2005
- Sponsor: James Raussen
- Governor: Bob Taft
- Code: Ohio Revised Code
- Section: § 2919.251
- Bill: HB 29
- Website: http://archives.legislature.state.oh.us/bills.cfm?ID=126_HB_29

Status: Current legislation

Amy's Law (House Bill 29) is an Ohio law that toughened requirements for granting bail or bond to persons accused of domestic assault in Ohio. The bill was sponsored by State Representative James Raussen (OH-28), It was signed into law by Governor Bob Taft on May 25, 2005, after domestic violence survivor Amy Rezos pushed for stronger penalties for domestic abusers in the state.

Under Amy's Law, each case involving an arrest or an investigation into a domestic violence incident requires police officers to complete a 20-question hazard assessment form. The bill also requires all violent offenders to appear before a judge before being released on bail or bond. Judges are provided with a copy of the risk assessment questionnaire during the bail hearing for the accused to aid them in making an informed decision. The assessment provides information on the severity of the offense, the mental health of the offender, and whether or not the suspect is a threat to any other person, among other risk factors.

== Background ==
Amy Jones and Christopher Rezos married in 1995 and separated in 2004. According to Amy, their relationship was never physically violent, although Chris was extremely controlling. Shortly after separating, on July 2, 2004, they met in a hotel room to discuss formalizing their divorce. Christopher attacked Amy during this meeting, beating her with a flashlight, which caused skull fractures and a broken vertebra. There were indications that Christopher had planned to stage the incident as a robbery gone wrong, indicating premeditation. Police intervened and Christopher was arrested but was quickly released on a $2,000 bond. He was arraigned a few days later but was released on a $100,000 bond. The judge was never advised of the severity of the beating, nor of the premeditated nature of the attack.

Several weeks later, on July 26, 2004, Christopher broke into Amy's van with a gun. He hid inside until she began to drive. Amy screamed when he revealed himself, which caused Christopher to shoot her in the head two times. Christopher was arrested, and Amy was taken to hospital in a coma. Despite the severity of her injuries, she awoke after four days. Christopher pled not guilty in court, and was held in Butler County jail awaiting trial.

While in custody, Christopher attempted to arrange a contract killing with another prisoner, with the intention that he would pay $10,000 for the inmate to murder Amy, Amy's brother, and Amy's mother. Police obtained taped evidence of the plot and charged Christopher, preventing the plot from going through. Christopher then pled guilty and was sentenced thirty years in prison without the possibility of parole or early release.

== House Bill 29 ==
After the three murder attempts, Amy Rezos became an outspoken critic of the laws that allowed Christopher to be released twice on bond after attacking her. At that time, Ohio state law required judges to determine whether a suspect charged with domestic violence violated a protection order or has a prior conviction for domestic violence before they could be held. As Christopher had never been charged with domestic violence and there was no protection order at the time of the first offense, he was not held.

House Bill 29 was proposed to change these laws. The bill was submitted to the Ohio House of Representatives in 2005 by State Rep. James T. Raussen. The House unanimously passed the bill (98–0) on April 27, 2005. It was ratified 30–0 by the Ohio Senate on May 4, 2005, and signed into law by Governor Taft on May 25.

Amy continues to push for tougher penalties for first-time abusers, and works with shelters and schools to give talks about domestic violence.
