= Jose Luis Nazario Jr. =

- Born: 1979 (age 46–47)
- Military career
- Allegiance: United States
- Branch: United States Marine Corps
- Service years: ? - 2006
- Rank: Sergeant
- Conflicts: Second Battle of Fallujah

Sergeant Jose Luis Nazario Jr. (born 1979) is the first American to be tried in a civilian court for war crimes which were allegedly committed while he was on active duty. Nazario was charged, under the Military Extraterritorial Jurisdiction Act, with voluntary manslaughter, assault with a deadly weapon and discharging a firearm during a crime of violence for his role in the death of four unarmed Iraqis. The Iraqis were killed on November 9, 2004, in Fallujah, Iraq, when Nazario was leading a squad of 13 Marines on house to house searches as part of Operation Phantom Fury, during the Second Battle of Fallujah.

Nazario, a former Marine, was charged under the 2000 Military Extraterritorial Jurisdiction Act for the killing of unarmed Iraqi detainees in the city of Falluja. His trial began on August 19, 2008.

Nazario retired from the Marine Corps in 2005. After his retirement he was to become a Police officer in his home-town of Riverside, California.

The incident became known publicly when one of Nazario's subordinates, Sergeant Ryan Weemer applied for a job with the United States Secret Service. During his interview he was asked to identify the most serious crime he had participated in, and he described his role in the killing.

Nazario's attorneys told CNN in July 2007 that Nazario totally denied the charges. Nazario was released on bail, after his arrest. But, because he was still in his probationary period with the police when he was arrested, he was dismissed. In 2010, Nazario sued the Riverside Police, to try force them to re-hire him. The court ruled in favor of the Riverside Police. Nazario appealed, and, in 2013, an appeals court upheld the decision not to re-hire him.

During his trial five of the thirteen subordinates in his squad testified that they were not eyewitnesses to the killings, but they heard the shots fired. Two of Nazario's subordinates, Sergeant Weemer and Sergeant Jermaine Nelson, faced contempt of court charges for their refusals to testify. The contempt charges were dropped a month later.

Although he refused to testify during Nazario's trial, in September 2009, Jermaine Nelson would later apologize for his role in the killings during his own trial, and place the blame for all the killings on Nazario. According to The Guardian, during Nelson's trial a tape of a confession Nelson made in 2007 was played, that offered: "a grisly account that Nazario beat detainees, killed two of them by shooting them in the forehead and ordered squad members to kill the other two."

Nazario's trial was held in his home town, Riverside, California, where he was formerly a police officer, with US District Court Judge Stephen G. Larson presiding. He was acquitted on August 28, 2008.

Nazario's defense team included Joseph Preis, Jared N. Klein and David Foberg, lawyers from the firm Pepper Hamilton, a firm that had worked previously on behalf of Guantanamo detainees.

After US District Court Judge Virginia A. Phillips ruled in favor of Riverside in a civil suite Nazario launched Richard K. De Atley of the Press Enterprise wrote that court statements revealed that the main reason Riverside had not re-instated Nazario was not that Riverside investigators concluded Navario had in fact killed the Iraqi civilians; rather it was "troubling statements" from Federal wiretaps of Nazario's phone, and a "2008 domestic abuse court action". Nazario had sued, based on the Uniformed Services Employment and Reemployment Rights Act, asking for $6 million in damages. De Atley quoted a passage from the wiretaps which stated Nazario said: "it was 'fun to ... around with people,' that he gets 'to beat somebody's ... because they're drunk,' ". De Atley noted that the court papers did not include evidence Nazario had beaten vulnerable members of the public for kicks.

The transcripts also recorded Nazario discussing how to subvert the reliability of polygraph tests with another police officer. According to De Atley in a passage in the wiretap transcripts that had been deemed inadmissible at his manslaughter trial, but had been admissible at his civil suit, Nazario described "how to respond directly if asked he had murdered anyone." De Atley wrote Nazario said: "Just be like, yeah, I was in combat. And they waive all that ..." Nazario's lawyers had argued that, if the city decided not to put any weight on the murder allegations once Nazario was acquitted they should have dropped the investigation, so they would not have come across the domestic violence court action, or Nazario's statements captured in the Federal wiretaps.
