= Military Extraterritorial Jurisdiction Act =

Law placing contractors under US law

Military Extraterritorial Jurisdiction Act of 2000
- Long title: An Act to amend title 18, United States Code, to establish Federal jurisdiction over offenses committed outside the United States by persons employed by or accompanying the Armed Forces, or by members of the Armed Forces who release or are released from active duty before prosecution, and for other purposes.
- Enacted by: the 106th United States Congress

Citations
- Public law: Pub. L. 106-523
- Statutes at Large: 114 Stat. 2488

Legislative history
- Introduced in the Senate as S. 768 by Jeff Sessions on April 13, 1999; Signed into law by President Bill Clinton on November 22, 2000

The Military Extraterritorial Jurisdiction Act (Pub. L. 106–523 (text) (PDF), 18 U.S.C. §§ 3261–3267) (MEJA) is a law intended to place military contractors under U.S. law when a crime is committed in an extraterritorial jurisdiction. As of March 2025, it has been used to charge 12 people.

== Overview ==
MEJA was a bill passed in 2000 that allowed persons who are "employed by or accompanying the armed forces" overseas may be prosecuted under the Military Extraterritorial Jurisdiction Act of 2000 for any offense that would be punishable by imprisonment for more than one year if committed within the special maritime and territorial jurisdiction of the United States.

"Employed by the armed forces" is defined to include civilian employees of the Department of Defense (DoD) as well as its contractors and their employees (including subcontractors at any tier), and, after October 8, 2004, civilian contractors and employees from other federal agencies and "any provisional authority," to the extent that their employment is related to the support of the Department of Defense mission overseas.

By the wording, MEJA is supposed to apply to Private Military Contractors and Private Security Contractors that previously fell out of the jurisdiction of being civilians or military personnel.

== Cases ==
The Department of Justice has reported that 12 persons have been charged under MEJA since its passage in 2000, with several investigations underway that may result in charges. Very few successful prosecutions involving DoD contractors in Iraq under MEJA have been reported. A contractor working in Baghdad pleaded guilty to possession of child pornography in February 2007. Another contract employee was prosecuted for abusive sexual contact involving a female soldier that occurred at Talil Air Force Base in 2004. A contract employee was indicted for assaulting another contractor with a knife in 2007.The law was used to prosecute former Marine Corps Sgt. Jose Luis Nazario, Jr. for the killing of unarmed Iraqi detainees, though he was ultimately acquitted.

== Efficacy ==
To date, the MEJA has been successfully used in four prosecutions. LaTasha Arnt was charged with stabbing her husband to death on Incirlik Air Base in Turkey in May 2003. She was extradited to stand trial in federal court in California, and later she pleaded guilty to voluntary manslaughter. Also, Aaron Langston, a resident of Snowflake, Arizona, was formally charged with assaulting a fellow contractor in Iraq with a knife. Langston was indicted by a federal grand jury in Phoenix on March 1, 2007. He was sentenced to 26 months in federal prison for the offense.

Steven Dale Green was successfully prosecuted under the MEJA for his participation in the rape and murder of an Iraqi girl, and the mass murder of her family. A private first class at the time of the killings, Green was honorably discharged just over two months after the incident due to a diagnosis of anti-social personality disorder. At that point, his involvement in the crime had not yet come to the attention of the authorities. The federal district court ultimately sentenced him to five consecutive life sentences. While the death penalty was available, the jury was unable to unanimously agree on it. (Green died on Feb 15, 2014; the cause of death was ruled suicide by hanging.)

On April 13, 2015, four former employees of the private defense contractor Blackwater USA (now Academi) were convicted under the MEJA for the Nissour Square massacre of fourteen Iraqi civilians on September 16, 2007. Three of the defendants received sentences of thirty years, while the fourth, Nicholas Slatten, was sentenced to life imprisonment. The men were members of a Blackwater unit assigned to secure Nisoor square in central Baghdad when they opened fire on a crowd of unarmed civilians. In all, fourteen Iraqis were killed and seventeen were wounded. On August 4, 2017, the United States Court of Appeals for the District of Columbia Circuit remanded the conviction of Nicholas Slatten for a retrial and held that the 30-year mandatory minimum sentences of the other three contractors constituted cruel and unusual punishment under the Eighth and Fourteenth Amendments and remanded their case for re-sentencing.
