= Bob Taft =

American politician (born 1942)

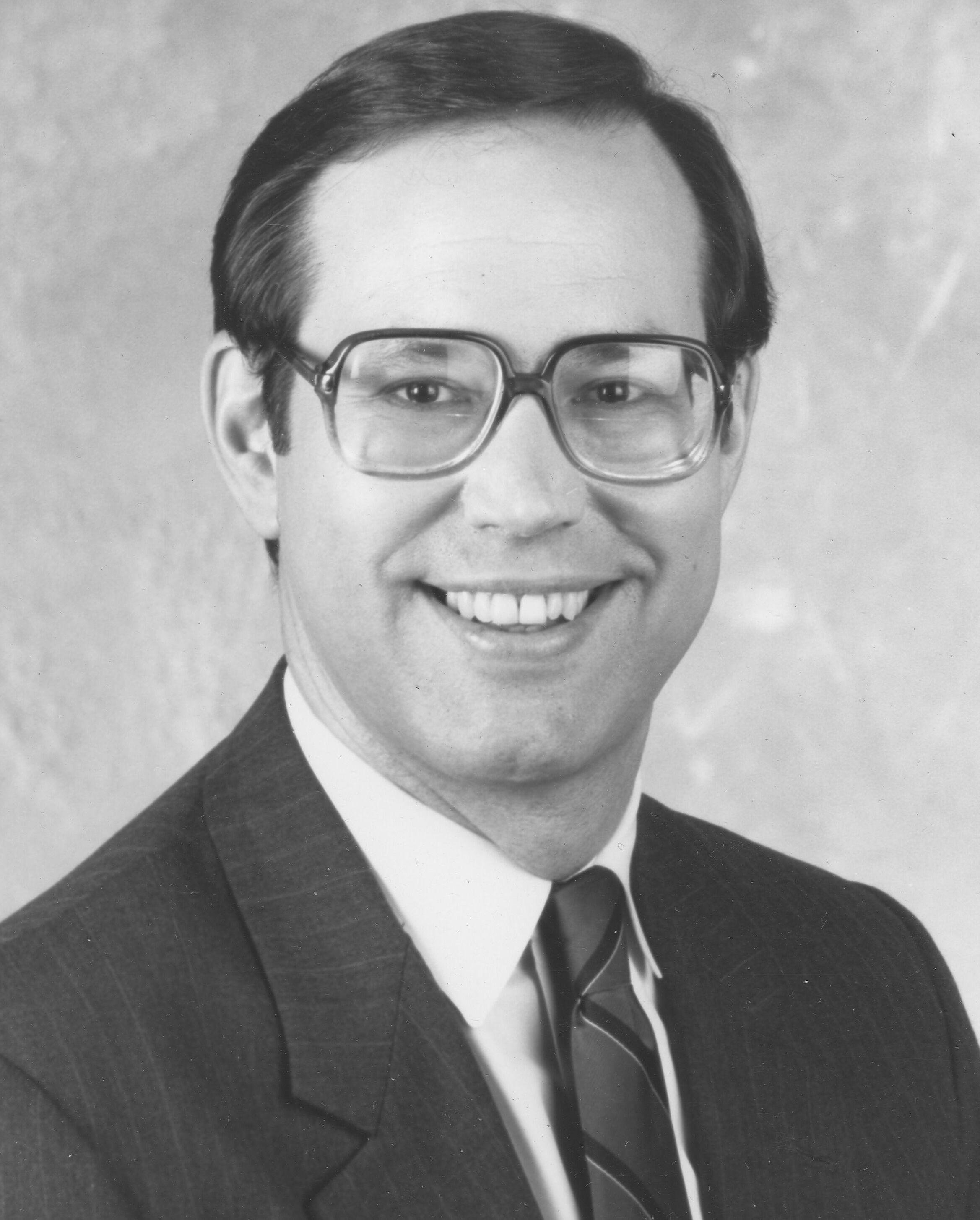
- Official portrait, 1990

67th Governor of Ohio
- In office January 11, 1999 – January 8, 2007
- Lieutenant: Maureen O'Connor; Jennette Bradley; Bruce Johnson
- Preceded by: Nancy Hollister
- Succeeded by: Ted Strickland

47th Secretary of State of Ohio
- In office January 14, 1991 – January 11, 1999
- Governor: George Voinovich; Nancy Hollister
- Preceded by: Sherrod Brown
- Succeeded by: Ken Blackwell

Member of the Ohio House of Representatives from the 65th district
- In office January 3, 1977 – January 3, 1981
- Preceded by: Frank H. Mayfield
- Succeeded by: John O'Brien

Personal details
- Born: Robert Alphonso Taft III; January 8, 1942 (age 84) Boston, Massachusetts, U.S.
- Party: Republican
- Spouse: Hope Rothert (m. 1967)
- Children: Anna Taft
- Relatives: Robert Taft Jr. (father)
- Education: Yale University (BA); Princeton University (MA); University of Cincinnati (JD)

Robert Alphonso Taft III (born January 8, 1942) is an American politician and attorney who served as the 67th governor of Ohio from 1999 to 2007. A member of the Republican Party, he previously served as Ohio secretary of state from 1991 to 1999 and in the Ohio House of Representatives from 1977 to 1981.

Taft is a member of the prominent Taft political family; his father was Senator Robert Taft Jr., his grandfather was Senate majority leader Robert A. Taft, and his great-grandfather was President William Howard Taft. He was raised in Cincinnati and graduated from Yale University, the Princeton School of Public and International Affairs, and the University of Cincinnati College of Law. He represented the 65th district in the Ohio House of Representatives from 1977 to 1981, then served as a Hamilton County commissioner from 1981 to 1990. After an unsuccessful run for lieutenant governor in 1986, he was elected secretary of state in 1990 and reelected in 1994.

Taft won the 1998 Ohio gubernatorial election against Democrat Lee Fisher by 5 percentage points and was reelected in 2002, defeating challenger Tim Hagan by more than 19 points. During his first term, Taft focused on economic development and education reform and maintained high approval ratings. In 2005, amid the Coingate scandal, he was indicted on four misdemeanor charges related to undisclosed gifts and illegal campaign contributions, becoming the first sitting Ohio governor charged with a crime. He pleaded no contest, was fined $4,000, and remained in office until the end of his second term in 2007. After leaving office, Taft became a faculty member at the University of Dayton beginning in 2007.

== Early life and education ==
Taft was born on January 8, 1942 in Boston, Massachusetts, to Robert Taft Jr. and Blanca Duncan Noel. At the time, his father was in his last year at Harvard Law School; Robert Taft Jr. would later serve as a U.S. Senator from 1971 to 1976. Bob's paternal grandfather was Senate majority leader Robert A. Taft; his patrilineal great-grandfather was President and Chief Justice William Howard Taft; and his patrilineal great-great-grandfather was Attorney General and Secretary of War Alphonso Taft.

Taft was raised in Cincinnati, Ohio, where he attended the Cincinnati Country Day School through the ninth grade and graduated from The Taft School. At Yale University, he was a member of the Yale Political Union, and graduated with a Bachelor of Arts degree in government in 1963. From 1963 to 1965, he served as a Peace Corps volunteer, teaching in Tanzania. He later attended the Woodrow Wilson School of Public and International Affairs at Princeton University, receiving a Master of Arts degree in government in 1967. He received his Juris Doctor from the University of Cincinnati College of Law in 1976.

== Early political career ==
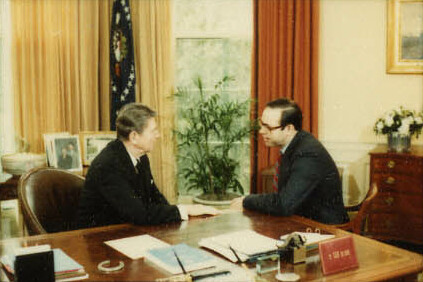
Taft with President Ronald Reagan, 1984

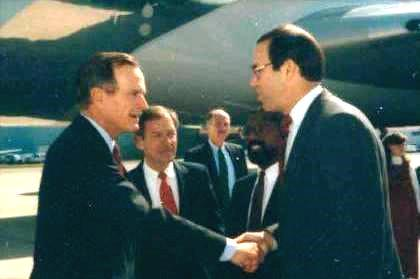
Taft greets President George H. W. Bush, 1990

Taft was elected as a Republican to the Ohio House of Representatives and served in the Ohio House of Representatives from 1977 to 1981, and then was Hamilton County commissioner from 1981 to 1990. He ran for Lieutenant Governor of Ohio on the ticket with Jim Rhodes in 1986, but was unsuccessful. In 1990, he was elected Ohio secretary of state, defeating incumbent Democrat Sherrod Brown. He was re-elected in 1994, defeating Democratic candidate Dan Brady.

== Governor of Ohio (1999–2007) ==
=== Elections ===
In December 1996, Taft announced he would run for governor of Ohio, becoming the first candidate to enter the race. He had been preparing for his run since 1995, raising money and securing the endorsement of term-limited incumbent George Voinovich. It was reported that a deal was made in 1990 that the state Republican Party would clear the field for Voinovich and in trade, they would clear it for Taft in 1998, but both men denied any deal taking place. Taft won the May 5, 1998 primary to become the Republican nominee. He then defeated Democrat Lee Fisher, the former Ohio attorney general, in the November 3 general election with 50 percent of the vote. He was sworn in for his first term on January 11, 1999.

In January 2002, it was reported that the governor had raised nearly 6 million dollars for his reelection campaign. Taft had high approval ratings going into the election (near 70 percent according to some polls), and experts predicted he would easily win. In the November 5 general election, Taft defeated Democrat Tim Hagan by nearly 20 points, with just under 58 percent of the vote. He was sworn in for his second term on January 13, 2003.

=== Economic development ===
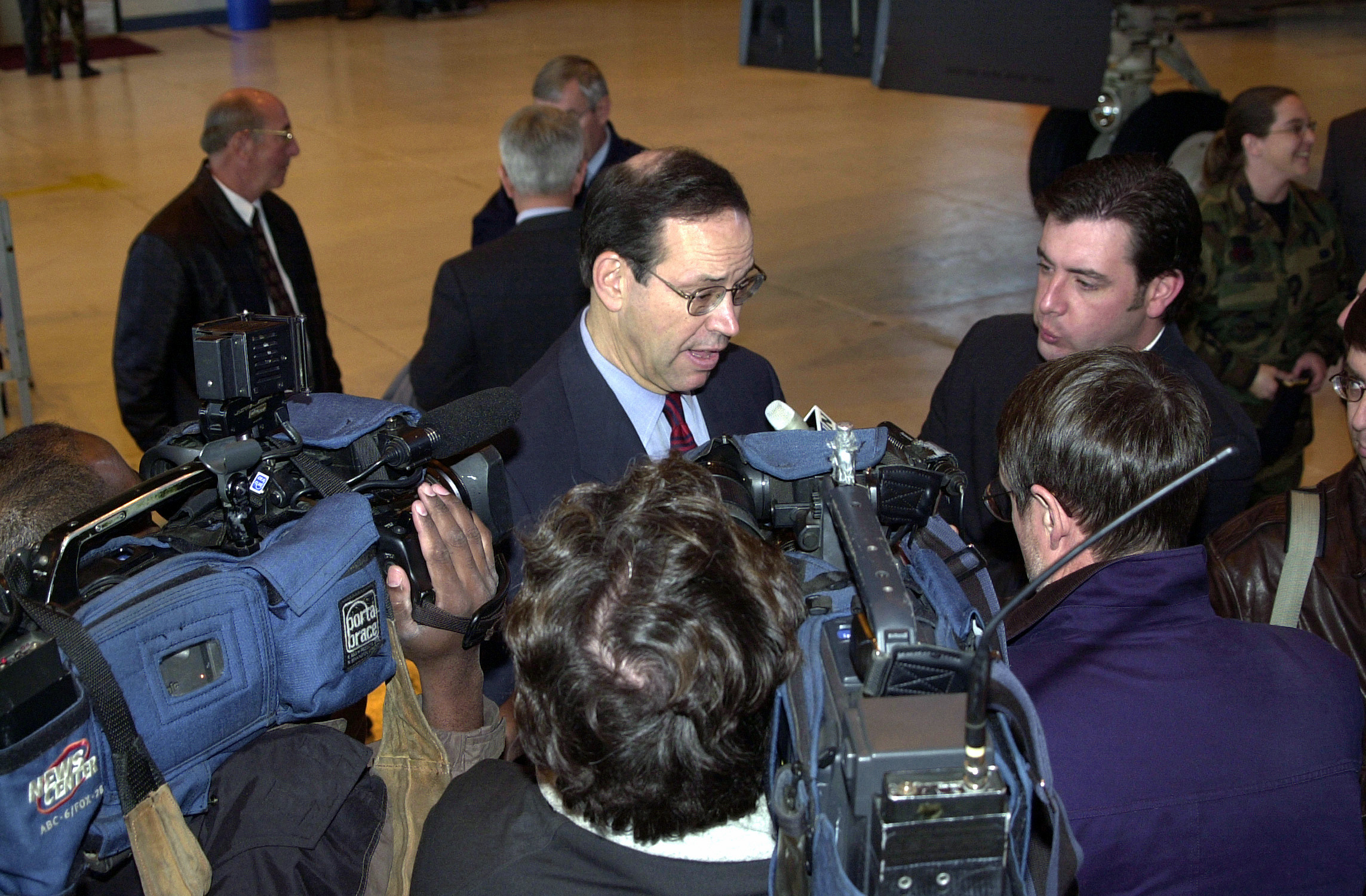
Taft addresses local media, 2001

The Third Frontier program, started under the Taft administration, as of 2009 was considered an enormous success in modernizing Ohio's 21st century economy. The program focuses on issuing funding for research, development, and commercialization projects to the biomedical, alternative energy, and the advanced propulsion industries and institutions, among others. Between 2003 and 2008 it dispersed $681 million, resulting in a $6.6 billion economic impact return and 41,300 jobs.

In 2001, Taft, along with other state leaders, met in Cleveland to unify in calling on the U.S. Congress to grant a funding request for the NASA Glenn Research Center, which was researching projects that included alternative and more efficient energy, and to designate NASA Glenn for the leadership role in biotechnology research. In 2005, Taft mandated that the Ohio Department of Transportation use 1 million US gallons (3,800 m^{3}) of B20 biodiesel and 30,000 US gallons (110,000 L) of E85 ethanol per year, while selecting flex-fuel vehicles for new purchases. ODOT had been using alternative fuels since 1999, and owned 193 flex-fuel vehicles when this announcement was made. Taft also mandated that ethanol tanks be constructed at all new ODOT facilities. Later in 2005, Taft urged the U.S. Congress to extend tax credits to those who install fuel cell electricity stations. As part of the Ohio Third Frontier program, $100 million in grants had already been issued for the research of fuel cells.

In 2003, Taft unveiled his "Jobs and Progress Plan", which was a $5 billion, 10-year agenda to improve Ohio's highways and roads. Among the notable projects were the $97 million Wilmington Bypass project, the $1 billion Cleveland Inner Belt project, and the $220 million Veterans' Glass City Skyway in Toledo.

In 2003, the state awarded $19.4 million for the creation of the Center for Stem Cell and Regenerative Medicine. Taft personally delivered the award to the institution in Cleveland. The state awarded another $8 million in 2006 from their Biomedical Research Research and Commercialization Program, which the Taft administration contributed to creating through the Third Frontier program. By 2009, the center had become recognized as a regional leader and had spun off four companies, conducted 51 clinical trials, treated over 250 patients with adult stem cells, and treated over 60 patients with other cell therapies.

Taft spent considerable time during his administration promoting the Great Lakes, which included lobbying the U.S. Congress for funding devoted to restoration projects, and signing pacts that included 8 Great Lakes states and 2 Canadian provinces to preserve the area. These pacts included "The Strategy to Restore and Protect the Great Lakes", which called for a $20 billion investment, cleanup, and renewal of the lakes, "The Great Lakes-St. Lawrence River Basin Sustainable Water Resources Agreement", which aimed to prevent new damage to the region, and "The Great Lakes-St. Lawrence River Basin Water Resources Compact". In 2001, Taft agreed to "Annex 2001", an addition to the Great Lakes Charter. In 2008, he joined the Board of Directors of the Alliance for the Great Lakes to help promote effective implementation of the Compact.

In early 2006, Taft announced his "Energy Action Plan", which included doubling the use of E85 ethanol in state fleets from 30,000 US gallons (110,000 L) to 60,000, increasing the use of biodiesel in state fleets by 100,000 US gallons (380,000 L) annually, while mandating the purchase of flex-fuel only vehicles for the state fleet, and allocating $3.6 million from the Energy Loan Fund to make state buildings energy efficient. The plan also called for $25 million from the Energy Loan Fund to be set aside over five years for wind turbine producing companies, and to set aside a grant of 1.2 cents per kilowatt-hour of electricity produced by wind energy. Taft called for a pilot program to create jet fuel from coal, moving Ohio's geological information on fossil fuel sources to digital formats, and reaffirming the state's commitment to FutureGen, a clean coal initiative.

Between 1998 and 2007, Ohio's green industry sector grew at the fourth-highest rate in the country, 7.3%. During Taft's tenure, Ohio was awarded the Governor's Cup twice, in 2003 and 2006. The award, selected by Site Selection Magazine, is given to the state that attracts the most business developments over $1 million, creates over 50 jobs, or constructs over 20,000 new square feet of business area during the course of a year. The honor is deemed as being considered the best state in the country for business development, attraction, and capital investment.

=== Education and workforce policy ===
When the Taft administration took over, the state was faced with an education crisis as nearly half of students were failing mandatory tests and were attending failing districts. Taft's "Rebuilding Ohio Schools" was an ambitious project that would pour $10 billion over 12 years into new school construction. The Taft administration ultimately presided over the largest increase in education funding in state history. According to the U.S. Department of Education, Ohio student scores increased during Taft's tenure, including 4th and 8th grade math scores every period, with Ohio students scoring above the national average every period in every subject. The number of high school graduates increased, and for the 2006-2007 school year Ohio produced the most advanced percentage of 8th grade science students in the country.

Taft signed legislation creating the Ohio Educational Choice Scholarship Pilot Program, which extended choice to students in failing schools, and the Ohio College Opportunity Grant, which extended grants to 11,000 new students.

=== Fiscal and legal policy ===
Taft was criticized during his tenure for permitting state spending and state taxes to rise. Critics also argued that Taft was responsible for the lagging Ohio economy during that time period, despite federal trade policies that were out of his control, resulting in the loss of 13,432 employment positions to international trade alone in 2006, and 71,242 employment positions lost overall between 1995 and 2006. Those figures are based on the Trade Adjustment Assistance Program figures, which has stringent standards that do not count all the employment positions truly lost to international trade.

In 2003, Taft signed legislation enacting the largest tax increase in state history, a temporary two-year, 1% sales tax which generated $2.9 billion in revenue during the national recession. In 2005, Taft signed major tax reform, including a 21% personal income tax cut over five years, a reduction of the sales tax by 0.5%, elimination of the corporate franchise tax over five years, and the elimination of the personal tangible property tax over four years. The legislation also included nominal tax credit increases, including $50 for personal and dependent exemptions, and $88 in deductions for deposits made into Ohio Medical Savings Accounts. In 2006, Taft signed Substitute House Bill 49, which provided a 25% tax credit for historic rehabilitation projects.

In January 2003, Taft signed Ohio Senate Bill 281 into law, which limited non-economic damages in medical injury lawsuits. The bill limited non-economic damages to $350,000 and imposed a statute of limitations. Taft then signed Ohio Senate Bill 80, introduced by Sen. Steve Stivers, into law in January 2005, which placed further caps on lawsuit awards in general.

Taft presided over the reintroduction of capital punishment in Ohio. During his term, 24 people were put to death by lethal injection, more than any other state outside the South. He granted one commutation. However, in 2021, Taft co-authored an op-ed with former Ohio attorneys general Lee Fisher and Jim Petro, calling for the state to abolish capital punishment.

In May 2005, Taft signed House Bill 29, also known as Amy's Law into law, tightening restrictions on bond for suspects accused of domestic violence.

In February 2006, Taft vetoed legislation passed by both houses of the Ohio General Assembly removing the 'Plain Sight' provision from the state's concealed carry law. The bill would have also kept The Plain Dealer from publishing the names and home addresses of licensees. Nevertheless, this provision passed into law when the General Assembly overrode his veto, the first veto override in Ohio in over 30 years.

=== Veterans affairs ===
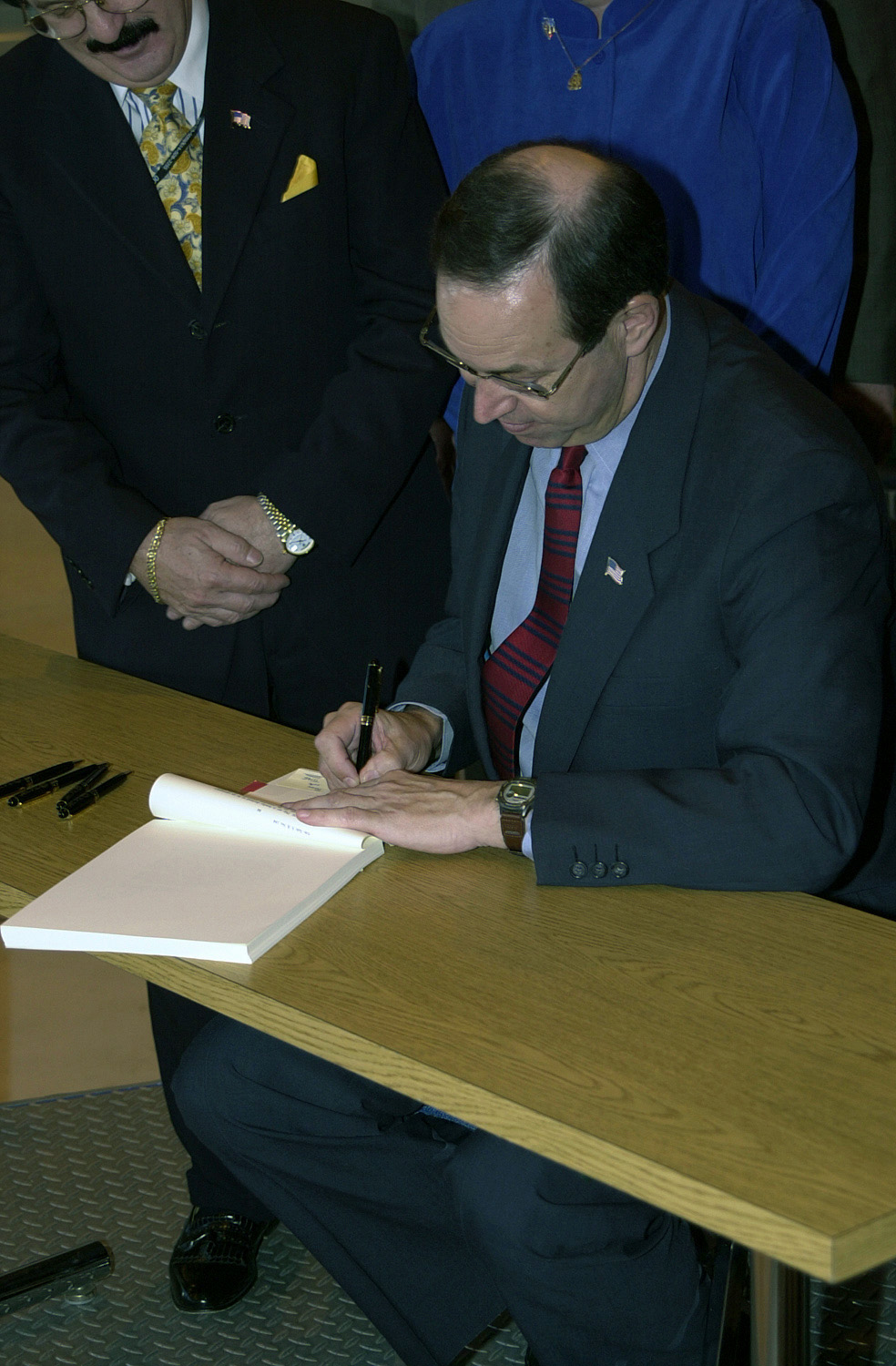
Taft signing a bill into law at Rickenbacker Air National Guard Base in 2001

In December 2000, Taft signed House Bill 408, which designated Interstate 76 as the "Military Order of the Purple Heart Memorial Highway". In July 2001, he signed legislation to permit school districts to award high school diplomas to veterans of World War II from the United States who were called into service before obtaining their diploma. In November 2001, with the ensuing war on terror set to begin, Taft signed Ohio Senate Bill 164, called the Military Pay Bill, into law. The bill protected the benefits of state employees called into full-time active service. In 2003, he signed Ohio Senate Bill 47, introduced by Sen. Steve Stivers, which provided additional time to soldiers on active duty to pay their property taxes, interest free. In 2004, he signed legislation renaming the "Michael A. Fox Highway" to the "Butler County Veterans Highway", and proclaimed November to be "Hire a Veteran Month" in Ohio.

In 2005, Taft signed legislation creating the Military Injury Relief Fund, which allowed taxpayers to donate a portion of their tax refund to help fund grants for injured veterans. He successfully lobbied, along with others, in 2006 to have the Royal Netherlands Air Force join the Ohio Air National Guard in training missions in Springfield. Taft signed numerous other pieces of legislation extending benefits to service members, and in 2006 was honored with the National Guard Association of the United States' Charles Dick Medal of Merit, in which the press release stated "Taft fought to ensure that Ohio's Soldiers, Airmen and their families were cared for in all aspects of their service, and presided over an unprecedented expansion of state benefits for Guardmembers and their families." Ohio's adjutant general Maj. Gen. Gregory L. Wayt stated about Taft that "he epitomizes what a commander-in-chief of a National Guard should be. During his term he has stood strong with the National Guard."

His wife, Hope, started the "On the Ohio Homefront" initiative, which is an online database of businesses and charities that provide discounts and services catered toward veterans.

=== Controversies ===
Taft's administration was embroiled in the Coingate scandal, which centered on investments made in 1998 and 2001 by the Ohio Bureau of Workers' Compensation in a rare-coin fund managed by Republican fundraiser Tom Noe. In 2005, investigators found that coins backed by state investments worth $10–$12 million were missing and that only $13 million of the original $50 million invested could be accounted for. Noe was convicted of running a criminal enterprise, the theft of $13 million from the fund, and of keeping a second set of books to cover for it.

The scandal drew scrutiny to ties between state officials and political donors. In 2001, a ruling by the Ohio Ethics Commission made clear that any free rounds of golf paid for by lobbyists which were valued over $75 were to be disclosed. Taft stated he was not aware of the opinion until 2005 after news reports surfaced about the Coingate scandal. In a 2003 questionnaire for a possible appointment to the Ohio Turnpike Commission, Noe indicated to Taft he was not doing business with the state, although he had been. Taft personally notified the commission of possible disclosure failures, and offered his cooperation in correcting the issues in voluntarily triggering an investigation.

On August 17, 2005, Taft was charged with four criminal misdemeanors stemming from his failure to disclose golf outings paid for by lobbyists, as well as some undisclosed gifts. The Associated Press reported the total value of at least 52 undisclosed gifts as about $5,800. This was the first time an Ohio governor has ever been charged with a crime while in office. Taft pleaded no contest and was fined $4,000 plus court costs. Judge Mark Froehlich also ordered Taft to apologize to the people of Ohio as well as state employees. Taft was quoted after sentencing stating "I offer my sincere and heartfelt apology, and I hope the people will understand that these mistakes, though major and important mistakes, were done unintentionally, and I hope and pray they will accept my apology." During the sentencing it was noted that Taft had a 30-year unblemished record as a public official.

In addition to the criminal sanctions, Taft was issued a public reprimand by the Ohio Supreme Court on December 27, 2006 for accepting and failing to report gifts and golf outings worth more than $6,000. This reprimand was attached to Taft's license to practice law in Ohio. After the fallout from his conviction, Taft called for a ban on executive-level government officials from accepting gifts of any amount from lobbyists.

Taft was the subject of a federal lawsuit in 2005, NARAL v. Taft, over his decision to allow "Choose Life" license plates to be sold by the state to raise funds for pregnancy crisis centers and adoption centers. They were considered by the American Civil Liberties Union to be "viewpoint discrimination", thus unconstitutional. The district court dismissed the ACLU's lawsuit, and they later withdrew their appeal from the 6th Circuit Court of Appeals.

=== Job approval ===
At the beginning of his governorship in 1999, Taft had an approval rating of 49 percent. His approval rating had reached 63 percent by November 1999, and 69 percent by November 2001. By May 2002, his approval rating had fallen to 59 percent, but by July it had recovered to 62 percent. Going into the 2002 gubernatorial election, Taft had approval ratings in the high 60s.

Shortly after beginning his second term in January 2003, his approval rating fell to 40 percent, with disapproval at 48 percent. By May 2003, his disapproval rating grew to 50 percent, a level unseen for an Ohio governor in 20 years. Taft's sudden dip in approval ratings was likely due to Ohio's lagging economy and tax increases.

In early 2004, Taft's approval rating showed signs of recovery at 47 percent. In early 2005, when the Coingate scandal was revealed, Taft's approval rating slumped to 34 percent, which was at the time the second lowest approval rating found for an Ohio governor. In late 2005, after his conviction for his involvement in the scandal, polls found the governor had an approval rating of just 15 percent—the lowest approval rating ever found for an Ohio governor. Other polls found that Taft's approval rating was even lower at 6.5 percent, according to Zogby, giving him quite possibly the lowest polled approval rating ever by a United States politician. A SurveyUSA poll that same month gave Taft a rating of 18 percent. In a response, a spokesman for Taft told the Associated Press, "the governor doesn't govern by the polls, he governs by good public policy and making a difference for Ohioans". A late-2005 article in Time named Taft as one of the three worst governors in the country.

During 2006, Taft's final year in office, his approval hovered in the low-to-mid 20s. Taft's unpopularity contributed to major Democratic gains in the 2006 election, including the defeat of Republican Ken Blackwell by Democrat Ted Strickland in the race to replace Taft as governor. In polling conducted by Quinnipiac University in December 2006, Taft left the governorship with an approval rating of only 16 percent.

== Post-gubernatorial activities ==
After Taft left the governorship, he and his wife made a trip to Tanzania in February 2007 where he had served as a Peace Corps volunteer. Taft said the trip was invigorating and that the buildings where he taught and lived 40 years earlier were still there.

Taft joined the University of Dayton in August 2007 as a distinguished research associate for educational excellence. His job is to help the university launch the Center for Educational Excellence, which encourages students to study science, technology, engineering, and math. "We've got to figure out how to get more students in college, and that's a challenge that I really look forward to." Thomas Lasley II, dean of the School of Education and Allied Professions, stated Taft was the first professional who refused his salary offer for being too high. Lasley was quoted "I think the more people have gotten to know him [Taft] the more they realize he is a very ethical individual".

In November 2008, he joined the Board of Directors of the Alliance for the Great Lakes to help advance Great Lakes education and policy initiatives, such as the Great Lakes-St. Lawrence Basin Water Resources Compact, started during his tenure as Chairman of the Council of Great Lakes Governors. As of 2017, he is on the board of directors for Battelle for Kids, an education-focused not-for-profit organization. Taft is a member of the ReFormers Caucus of Issue One.

Taft endorsed incumbent Democratic U.S. senator Sherrod Brown in the 2024 United States Senate election in Ohio. In November 2026, Taft was named an honorary co-chair for the inaugural committee of Governor-elect Amy Acton, alongside all other then-living former governors.

== Legacy ==
The Taft Coliseum at the Ohio Expo Center and Ohio State Fairgrounds in Columbus was renamed in honor of Taft on July 28, 2010.

== See also ==
- Taft family

Party political offices
Preceded by Jim Betts	Republican nominee for Lieutenant Governor of Ohio; 1986	Succeeded by Mike DeWine
Preceded by Vincent Campanella	Republican nominee for Secretary of State of Ohio; 1990, 1994	Succeeded by Ken Blackwell
Preceded by George Voinovich	Republican nominee for Governor of Ohio; 1998, 2002	Succeeded by Ken Blackwell
Preceded by Bill Owens	Chair of the Republican Governors Association; 2003–2004	Succeeded by Kenny Guinn
Political offices
Preceded by Sherrod Brown	Secretary of State of Ohio; 1991–1999	Succeeded by Ken Blackwell
Preceded by Nancy Hollister	Governor of Ohio; 1999–2007	Succeeded by Ted Strickland
U.S. order of precedence (ceremonial)
Preceded by Nancy Hollister as Former Governor	Order of precedence of the United States	Succeeded by Ted Strickland as Former Governor
