= Thomas Noe =

Former Ohio Republican party fundraiser and activist

Thomas W. Noe (born July 1954) is a former Ohio Republican party fundraiser and activist, guilty of money laundering for the 2004 Bush-Cheney campaign and of theft and corruption in the Coingate scandal. A longtime resident of Toledo, Ohio, Noe and his wife, Bernadette, held several party positions and minor offices within the government of Ohio. He was also a prominent Republican fundraiser and served as chairman of the 2004 Bush-Cheney election campaign in Northwest Ohio and chairman of the Lucas County Republican party. Noe was also an avid coin dealer and owned various coin dealing companies, such as Capital Coin and Vintage Coins & Collectibles, as well as their subsidiaries.

== Organizations and offices ==
=== The Republican Party ===
Both Noe and his wife, Bernadette Restivo-Noe, have been chairperson of the Lucas County Republican party.

Thomas Noe was also chairman of the George W. Bush 2004 presidential campaign in Northwest Ohio, where he was convicted of making illegal contributions to the campaign.

=== Board of Elections ===
During the 2004 election, Noe's wife Bernadette was chairman of the Lucas County Board of Elections. In the 2004 election, the county experienced extreme voting difficulties, including criminal investigations and manipulation of the recount, and many officials resigned or were suspended. The Ohio Secretary of State told Bernadette to resign or be fired. She resigned from both the Lucas County Republican Party and the Lucas County Board of Elections in December 2004.

=== Board of Regents ===
Noe was appointed to the Ohio Board of Regents, which oversees Ohio's public colleges and universities, by former Ohio Governor George Voinovich in 1995 to complete a vacated term. Noe was reinstated for a full 9-year term in 1999 by Governor Bob Taft.

In late 2004, Noe wrote to the Ohio Ethics Commission to seek an opinion on his involvement with Hi-Genomics LLC, which licensed a patent on plant genetic engineering from the University of Toledo. Noe was vice-president of Hi-Genomics LLC and owned a 23% stake in the company. Noe's position on the Board of Regents was deemed to be a conflict of interest by the Ohio Ethics Commission. Noe was told to either resign from the Board, divest his interest in the company, or step down as vice-president of the company. Noe eventually sold his units in Hi-Genomics to one of the other unitholders.

=== Turnpike Commission ===
In 2003 Governor Taft appointed Noe chairman of the Ohio Turnpike Commission for an 8-year term. On May 10, 2005, Noe resigned from the Turnpike Commission.

== Coin politics and business ==
Apart from being President of his company, Thomas Noe Inc. (Noe owns 60%), Noe owns and/or manages many different companies that deal rare coins. His store, Vintage Coins & Collectibles (or Vintage Coins & Cards), is the parent company. Noe was also a statutory agent for the Professional Numismatists Guild, a nonprofit organization of top numismatists whose members follow a strict code of ethics, for more than 25 years. He resigned in May 2005.

Noe served as chairman of the Ohio Commemorative Quarter Program Committee during its operation in the 2000s. Noe was appointed chairman of the U.S. Mint's Citizens Coinage Advisory Committee (CCAC) by U.S. Secretary of the Treasury John W. Snow in October 2004. The CCAC advises the secretary on issues relating to commemorative coin design and circulation. He was recommended by U.S. House Representative Dennis Hastert. He resigned in May 2005.

== Legal troubles ==
Noe has been convicted in two separate, but overlapping investigations for a variety of corrupt activities in Ohio and in national politics.

=== Campaign contributions ===
On October 27, 2005, Noe was indicted in a federal investigation on counts of conspiracy, conduit contribution violations, and false statements.

Noe was accused of illegally funneling $45,400 to President Bush's re-election campaign, using "two dozen people as "conduits" to make illegal campaign contributions at a $2,000-a-seat fund-raiser in Columbus. Conduits named in a federal affidavit include Lucas County Commissioner Maggie Thurber, Toledo City Councilwoman Betty Shultz, former Toledo Mayor Donna Owens and former State Representative Sally Perz. In doing so, Noe skirted federal campaign finance funding limits while meeting a pledge to raise $50,000 for the October 30, 2003, fund-raiser. The Bush campaign later named Noe a "Pioneer" for raising at least $100,000 overall ... In addition to "conduits" who received between $1,750 and $4,000 from Noe to make either one or two contributions, prosecutors claim that the former rare-coin dealer used two people as "super-conduits," giving them $6,000 and $14,300 that they then split with others who attended the fund-raiser." Noe is now serving a jail term of at least 10 years.

On October 31, 2005, Noe pled not-guilty to all three charges. On May 31, 2006, Noe reversed his earlier plea and pled guilty.

On September 12, 2006, Noe was sentenced to 27 months in a federal prison for funneling money into the re-election campaign of President Bush illegally.

=== Coingate ===
Noe is also at the center of the Ohio Coingate scandal. On November 13, 2006, Noe was found guilty of theft, money laundering, forgery and corrupt activity, and the central charge: that he engaged in a pattern of corruption in his management of Ohio's $50 million rare-coin fund investment with the bureau.

On February 13, 2006, the Lucas County District Court of Ohio indicted Noe along with his business partner, Timothy LaPointe.

The prosecution presented their case in three weeks that Noe stole $2 million for personal use; the defense argued that Noe's government contract allowed him the freedom to use the state's money however he wanted, but called no witnesses. The jury deliberated for three days before delivering their verdict. On November 20, 2006, Thomas Noe was given an 18-year sentence, to be served after the 27-month federal sentence imposed in September, fined $213,000, "ordered to pay the cost of the prosecution, estimated at nearly $3 million, and ordered to pay restitution to the Ohio Bureau of Workers' Compensation for the money missing from the rare-coin fund, estimated at $13.7 million." On April 21, 2020, he was released from prison after governor Mike DeWine commuted his sentence in part due to COVID-19 concerns.

Earlier, on August 17, 2005, Ohio Governor Bob Taft was charged with four criminal misdemeanors stemming from his failure to disclose golf outings paid for by lobbyists, as well as some undisclosed gifts. The gifts were varied, but included gifts from Noe. It was the first time an Ohio governor had ever been charged with a crime while in office.

== See also ==
- Coingate scandal
