= Coingate scandal =

2005 investment scandal

Coingate is a nickname for the Tom Noe investment scandal in Ohio revealed in early 2005 in part by Toledo, Ohio newspaper The Blade. The Ohio Bureau of Workers' Compensation (BWC) invested hundreds of millions of dollars in high risk or unconventional investment vehicles run by people closely connected to the Ohio Republican Party who had made large campaign contributions to many senior Republican party officials.

The rare coin investment fund attracted particular scrutiny after it was reported that two coins worth more than $300,000 had been lost. Further investigation then revealed that coins worth $10–$12 million were missing and that only $13 million of the original $50 million invested could be accounted for. Tom Noe was convicted of running a criminal enterprise, the theft of $13 million from the fund, and of keeping a second set of books to cover for it.

== Background ==
In 1996, the Republican-controlled Ohio General Assembly passed a law that struck the requirement that the Ohio state government invest solely in bonds. Fund managers and other brokers then scrambled to offer their services.

The Coingate scandal centers on Tom Noe, an Ohio government figure, GOP fundraiser and coin dealer. In a separate fundraising scandal, Noe was indicted by a federal grand jury in late October 2005, charged with violating campaign contribution laws by using strawmen, or proxies, for contributions. On May 31, 2006, Noe pleaded guilty.

== Coins ==
In March 1998, Thomas Noe Inc. was awarded a $50 million (Note: equivalent to $98.8 million in 2025) investment contract for the Ohio Workers' Compensation fund. The company received $25 million (Note: equivalent to $49.4 million in 2025) to invest in 1998, and the same again in 2001. (Note: equivalent to $45.5 million in 2025) Before this, Mr. Noe and his then managers had increased their contributions to Republican candidates by nearly 10 times. By April, according to the February 2006 indictment, Noe had already begun his illegal activities, stealing money from the investment. "His illegal actions continued until it was shut down this past May", the indictment said. To manage the investment, Thomas Noe Inc. used a newly created subsidiary of Noe's company Vintage Coins & Collectibles, called Capital Coin (specifically, Capital Coins Ltd. I and Capital Coins Ltd. II). Capital Coin then created subsidiaries Visionary Rare Coins, Numismatic Professionals, and Rare Coin Alliance

In 1998, Noe hired Mark Chrans to manage Visionary Rare Coins. Chrans had previously been convicted for fraud and perjury involving money-laundering in coin deals. Noe says he wasn't aware of Chrans's previous convictions. Spokesman Jeremy Jackson of the bureau said the bureau was also unaware of the convictions. In the end, Capital Coin wrote off $850,000 in losses from Visionary Rare Coins, including bad investments, unpaid loans, and advances on coin deals.

In 2003, Numismatic Professionals bought two coins for $185,000, (Note: equivalent to $323,783 in 2025) an 1855 $3 gold coin and an 1845 $10 gold coin, thought to be worth $300,000 (Note: equivalent to $525,054 in 2025) at market value. After sending the coins to be certified, they were stolen from the mail on the way back. Police were notified, but they could not determine how the coins were lost and closed the case.

Capital Coin also loaned dealer Delaware Valley Rare Coins in Broomall, Pennsylvania, which is not owned or controlled by Noe, $300,000 from the fund, which the dealer then used for his own business. The dealer used property in New Jersey as collateral. The Ohio newspaper The Toledo Blade made a public records request to the government to view the mortgage documents. Capital Coin had redacted the records, blacking out the address of the property and the owners. The Ohio attorney general ordered Noe to release the documents, noting "anyone pledging property as collateral to back publicly funded investments must make their name and address public." Lawyers for Capital Coin refused. The case was eventually settled.

Only $13 million of the original $50 million invested has been recovered to date.

In March 2006, a sealed-bid auction process was initiated to liquidate all high-risk coin and paper money assets.

== Investigation ==
Attention first focused on the matter after the April 3, 2005 publication of a story by the Toledo Blade.

On May 24, 2005, Thomas Noe Inc. was sued by the state of Ohio on behalf of the BWC. The judge granted the Ohio Attorney General's request to immediately freeze the assets and the BWC was given complete control of the coin funds.

Ohio state investigators immediately began to check inventory of the various companies, reviewing records and documents at Numismatic Professionals and another subsidiary in Sarasota, Florida. (Note: From information available, it is unclear which subsidiary is located where.) However, investigators were denied access to one of Capital Coin's subsidiaries in Monclova Township and to Delaware Valley Rare Coins. Noe said access was denied to the Ohio location because his lawyers were busy in Colorado and Florida and he said he was initially told the Ohio company was to be searched later. Noe said he neither owns nor controls Delaware Valley Rare Coins, reasoning that this is the reason investigators were denied access. (Note: From information available, it is unclear why investigators were necessarily denied access to this company.)

The Ohio inspector general became involved and asked to see the coins. $10–12 million worth of coins were apparently unaccounted for.

On July 13, the Ohio Supreme Court ruled 5-2 that the coin-fund records were public record and should be released, rejecting the state's argument that the information was "trade secrets" and exempt from the Ohio Public Records Act. The case was heard by five Ohio appellate court justices, as five of the Supreme Court justices recused themselves having accepted campaign donations from Noe. However, after two weeks, Ohio Attorney General Jim Petro had released only 3 of the 120 boxes of documents. The Toledo Blade, on July 28, filed a motion to find the state in contempt.

On July 29, The former chief of staff to Governor Bob Taft, Columbus lobbyist Brian Hicks, and his assistant, Cherie Carroll, were convicted of ethics violations in the widening Coingate scandal. Hicks was convicted of failing to disclose cut-rate vacations at Tom Noe's residence in the Florida Keys, and Carroll for accepting free meals from Noe at a downtown Columbus steakhouse.

On August 18, 2005, Governor Bob Taft pleaded no contest to four misdemeanor violations of state ethics laws. Taft admitted that over seven years he failed to report 45 golf outings provided to him, including a number of events and gifts from Noe, and was assessed a $4,000 (Note: equivalent to $6,594 in 2025) fine. It was the first time an Ohio governor was ever charged with a crime while in office.

== Indictment, trial and conviction ==
On February 13, 2006, the Lucas County Court of Common Pleas indicted Noe, along with his business partner, Timothy LaPointe.

According to the indictments, among other acts, Noe and LaPointe borrowed coins from other businesses and individuals and fraudulently listed those as belonging to the state during annual audits in 2002, 2003 and 2004.

The prosecution presented their case in three weeks that Noe stole $2 million (Note: equivalent to $3.3 million in 2025) for personal use; the defense argued that Noe's government contract allowed him the freedom to use the state's money however he wanted, but called no witnesses. The jury deliberated for three days before delivering their verdict.

On November 13, 2006, Noe was found guilty of theft, money laundering, forgery and corrupt activity, and the central charge that carries a ten-year mandatory minimum sentence: that he engaged in a pattern of corruption in his management of Ohio's $50 million rare-coin fund investment with the bureau.

On November 20, 2006, Noe was sentenced 18 years in state prison and ordered to pay fines and restitution. He was fined $213,000, (Note: equivalent to $340,174 in 2025) ordered to pay an estimated $3 million (Note: equivalent to $4.79 million in 2025) for the cost of the prosecution, and ordered to pay restitution to the Ohio Bureau of Workers’ Compensation for the money missing from the rare-coin fund, estimated at $13.7 million. (Note: equivalent to $21.9 million in 2025)
