= Ohio Bureau of Workers' Compensation =

Ohio government agency

Agency overview
- Formed: 1912
- Headquarters: William Green Building 30 West Spring Street, Columbus, Ohio
- Website: www.bwc.ohio.gov

The Only in Ohio Bureau of Workers' Compensation (OBWC or BWC) provides medical and compensation benefits for work-related injuries, diseases and deaths. It was founded in 1912. With assets under management of more than $29 billion, it is the largest state-operated and second largest overall provider of workers’ compensation insurance in the United States.

BWC is headquartered in Columbus, Ohio, and maintains 11 customer service offices throughout the state. BWC provides insurance to about two-thirds of Ohio's work force. BWC employs approximately 1,700 people.

== History ==
With the signing of the Ohio Workmen's Compensation Act on June 15, 1911, Ohio created a no-fault system that would allow compensation to workers in the event of a workplace accident, while also shielding employers from legal action brought by the worker. On March 1, 1912, the Ohio General Assembly created the State Insurance Fund and in 1913, made coverage by employers mandatory. On April 28, 1913, Lemuel C. Fridley became the first Ohioan to receive a workmen's compensation check under the new system.

The Ohio Safety Congress and Expo was created in 1930. It has grown to the largest such conference in the Midwest, with more than 6,000 attendees, 200 vendors and 200 classes annually. In 2016, it was expanded to include a Medical & Health Symposium for providers.

As of the fiscal year ending June 30, 2015, BWC provides workers' compensation insurance coverage to approximately 253,000 public and private sector employers in the State of Ohio. In FY15, BWC paid $1,648,599,923 in benefits covering 791,638 open claims, including 93,936 new claims approved in FY15. It collected $1,954,174,000 in premiums in FY15, and incurred $279.6 million in administrative costs.

== Governance and structure ==
Day-to-day operations of the bureau are handled by a Chief Executive Officer/Administrator, who is appointed by the Governor. The BWC Board of Directors, also appointed by the Governor, oversees the agency's operations. The 11-member board provides professional expertise, accountability and transparency, and a broad representation of BWC's customers. The board also includes members with expertise in financial accounting, investments and securities, and actuarial management.

The current Administrator/CEO of Ohio BWC is John Logue, replacing Stephanie McCloud, who was appointed November 16, 2020 to the Ohio Department of Health.

== Scandals and controversies ==
=== Coingate ===
In 2005, the OBWC became involved in a massive investment scandal that ultimately contributed to the defeat of the Republican Party leadership of the state government in Ohio. It was revealed in early 2005, in part by a Toledo, Ohio, newspaper The Blade that the OBWC had invested hundreds of millions of dollars in high risk or unconventional investment vehicles run by people closely connected to the Ohio Republican Party who had made large campaign contributions to many senior Republican party officials.

Most notably, a rare coin investment fund has attracted particular scrutiny after it was reported that two coins worth more than $300,000 had been lost. Further investigation then revealed that coins worth $10–$12 million were missing and that only $13 million of the original $50 million invested could be accounted for. Thomas Noe, a Republican Party fundraiser and activist was charged with running a criminal enterprise, the theft of $13 million from the fund, and of keeping a second set of books to cover for it.

=== Private equity investments ===
In the aftermath of the Coingate scandal, the OBWC determined to reduce its exposure to investments perceived as "alternative" or "high risk" which included a $400 million portfolio of over 60 private equity and venture capital investment funds. A sale of the portfolio was reported in 2007.

However, as part of that sale process, OBWC engaged Ennis Knupp to conduct a thorough valuation of its alternative investment holdings. The Columbus Dispatch subsequently made a request under the Freedom of Information Act to receive the Ennis Knupp valuation report, which included confidential materials that the various private equity firms objected to OBWC disclosing. The various private equity firms settled a lawsuit with the Columbus Dispatch allowing a partial disclosure, however the generally secretive private equity industry followed the outcome closely.

=== Subsequent events ===
In the years following the Coingate scandal, BWC has replaced its senior management and investment teams and has been scrutinized heavily by the new Democratic administration in Ohio.

On June 26, 2007, the BWC was again in the news as a result of the theft of a laptop containing personal information for 439 injured workers.

On January 13, 2009, Ohio inspector general's office investigation reported that a high-paid employee had been spending most of his work hours, since 2005, downloading and viewing audio and video files from sexually explicit websites during working hours. The case was referred to prosecutors for possible charges involving theft of state time and the inspector general urged the BWC to monitor more closely its employees' computer use.

In January 2013, a plaintiff class of more than 270,000 Ohio businesses filed a report claiming it was due $860 million after the Ohio Bureau of Workers Compensation was found to have over-charged class members from 2001 to 2009. The report follows a decision from Judge Richard McMonagle of the Cuyahoga County Court of Common Pleas that the Ohio BWC violated two state statutes by charging the class excessive premiums. During the trial, the BWC conceded that the rates it charged non-group employers from 2001 to 2009 were excessive, according to case summary. BWC employees explained that those employers were charged a "huge surcharge" that resulted from a "broken group rating system." On March 20, 2013, Cuyahoga County Common Pleas Judge Richard McMonagle ordered the Ohio Bureau of Workers Compensation to refund $860 million in illegal over-charges to some 270,000 employers. In response to statements made by the Bureau's Administrator Steve Buehrer indicating a desire to appeal the decision, class members created a non-profit organization called Pay Us Back Ohio BWC, Inc. to organize the 270,000 employers against the Bureau of Workers' Compensation's costly appeal of the decision.

Thirteen months after the BWC filed its appeal, Ohio's 8th Appellate District Court upheld the original Court's decision and blasted the state agency saying that, "this appeal is about a cabal of Ohio Bureau of Workers’ Compensation (“BWC”) bureaucrats and lobbyists for group sponsors who rigged workers’ compensation insurance premium rates so that for employers who participated in the BWC’s group rating plan (“group-rated employers”), it was “heads we win,” and for employers who did not participate in the group rating plan ("nongroup-rated employers"), it was "tails you lose." In response, Ohio Governor John Kasich stated that BWC would authorize "A Billion Back," which refunded $1 billion in excess funds to Ohio employers, while potentially continuing the appeal of the ruling. As a result, members of Pay Us Back Ohio BWC, Inc. called on the Governor to instruct the Bureau to comply with the court orders and give back the money it owes." On July 21, 2014, plaintiff's counsel announced that a settlement had been reached with BWC.

== See also ==
- Government of Ohio
