= Center Township, Greene County, Pennsylvania =

Township in Pennsylvania, US

Coordinates: 39°52′16″N 80°17′35″W

- Township
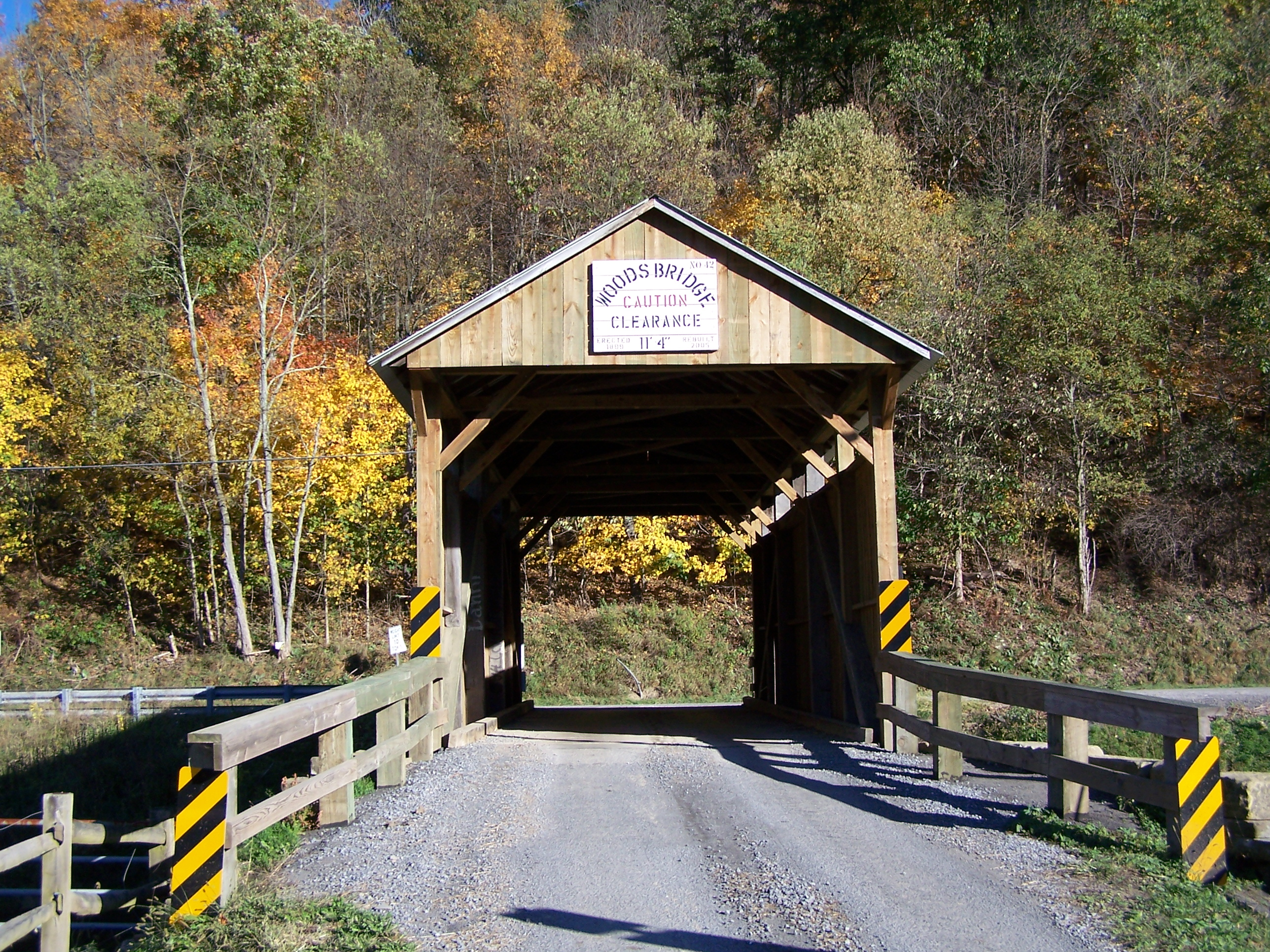
- Nettie Woods Covered Bridge (1882); National Register of Historic Places

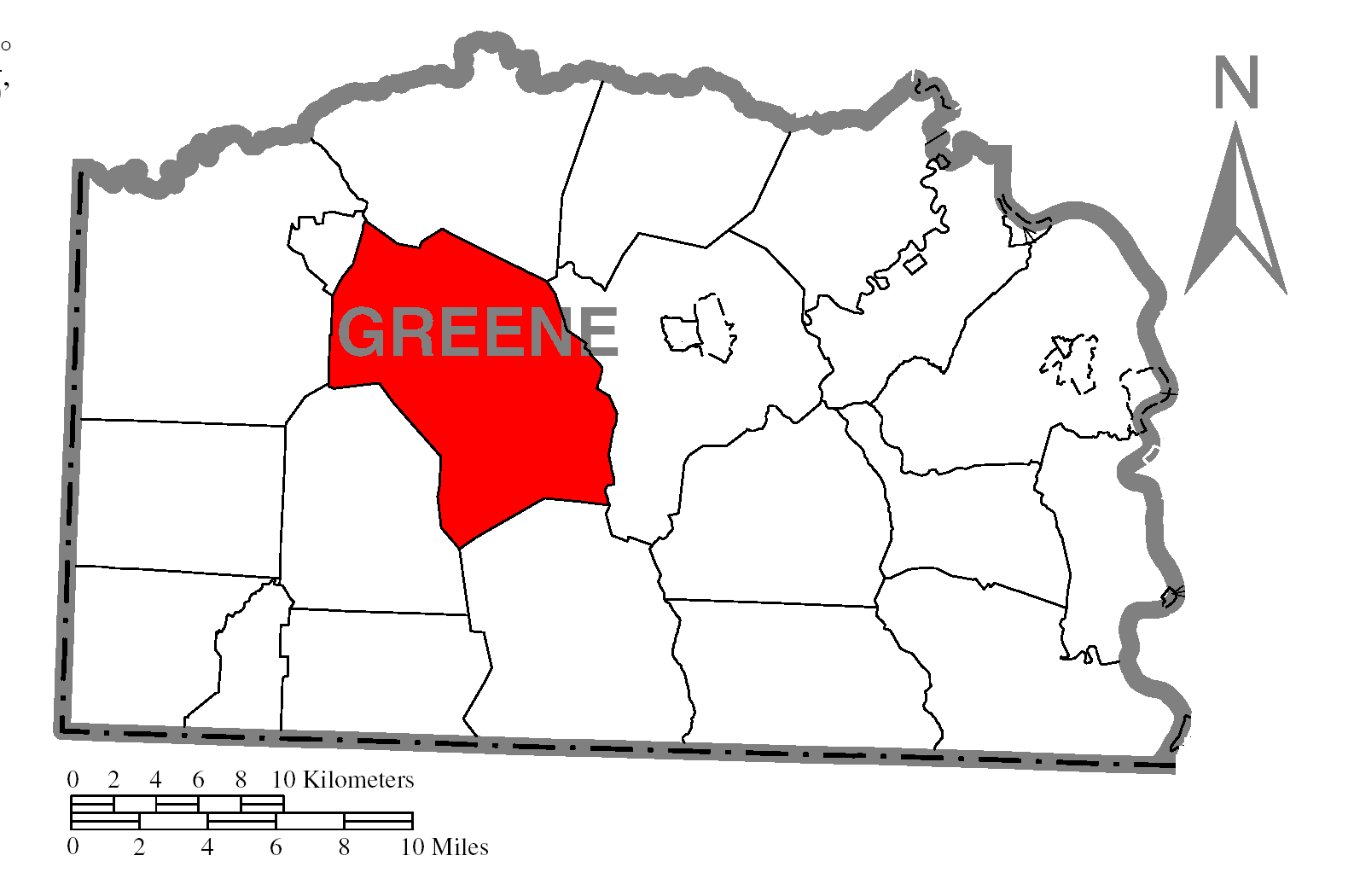
- Location of Center Township in Greene County

- Location of Greene County in Pennsylvania
- Country: United States
- State: Pennsylvania
- County: Greene

Area
  - Total: 48.95 sq mi (126.78 km^{2})
  - Land: 48.95 sq mi (126.77 km^{2})
  - Water: 0.0039 sq mi (0.01 km^{2})
- Elevation: 1,010 ft (310 m)

Population (2020)
  - Total: 1,113 ▼
  - Estimate (2023): 1,071
  - Density: 24.7/sq mi (9.55/km^{2})
- Time zone: UTC-4 (EST)
  - Summer (DST): UTC-5 (EDT)
- Area code: 724
- FIPS code: 42-059-12032
- Website: https://centertwpgreene.com/

Center Township is a township in Greene County, Pennsylvania, United States. The population was 1,113 at the 2020 census, down from 1,267 at the 2010 census.

== History ==
Center Township formed in 1820. The Scott Covered Bridge, Shriver Covered Bridge, and Nettie Woods Covered Bridge are listed on the National Register of Historic Places.

== Geography ==
Center Township is located just west of the center of Greene County. Rogersville, the main settlement in the township, is 7 miles (11 km) west of Waynesburg, the county seat. Other unincorporated communities in Center Township are Hunters Cave, Rutan, Holbrook, and Oak Forest.

According to the United States Census Bureau, the township has a total area of 49.0 square miles (126.8 km^{2}), of which 0.004 square miles (0.01 km^{2}), or 0.01%, is water. The township is drained by the South Fork of Tenmile Creek, an eastward-flowing tributary of the Monongahela River.

== Demographics ==
Historical population
Census	Pop.	Note	%±
2000	1,393		—
2010	1,267		−9.0%
2020	1,113		−12.2%
2025 (est.)	1,065		−4.3%
U.S. Decennial Census

As of the census of 2000, there were 1,393 people, 517 households, and 412 families residing in the township. The population density was 28.6 inhabitants per square mile (11.0/km^{2}). There were 566 housing units at an average density of 11.6/sq mi (4.5/km^{2}). The racial makeup of the township was 98.78% White, 0.14% African American, 0.07% Native American, and 1.01% from two or more races. Hispanic or Latino of any race were 0.50% of the population.

There were 517 households, out of which 36.6% had children under the age of 18 living with them, 65.0% were married couples living together, 10.1% had a female householder with no husband present, and 20.3% were non-families. 16.8% of all households were made up of individuals, and 7.4% had someone living alone who was 65 years of age or older. The average household size was 2.66 and the average family size was 2.97.

In the township the population was spread out, with 25.1% under the age of 18, 7.0% from 18 to 24, 29.2% from 25 to 44, 25.6% from 45 to 64, and 13.1% who were 65 years of age or older. The median age was 38 years. For every 100 females, there were 96.8 males. For every 100 females age 18 and over, there were 98.7 males.

The median income for a household in the township was $31,492, and the median income for a family was $31,850. Males had a median income of $33,958 versus $21,375 for females. The per capita income for the township was $14,610. About 15.3% of families and 16.5% of the population were below the poverty line, including 24.2% of those under age 18 and 8.8% of those age 65 or over.
