= James R. Morris =

American politician

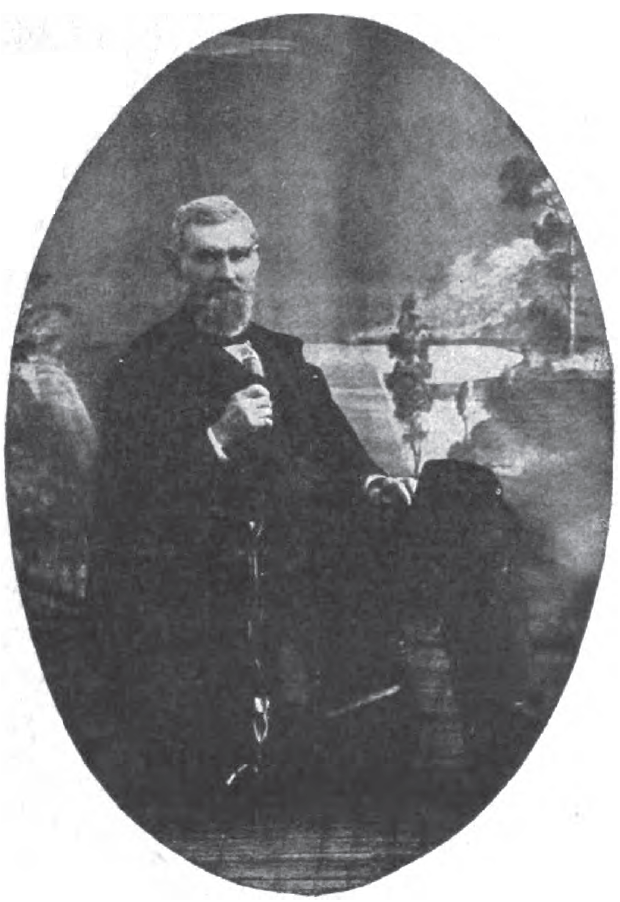

Member of the U.S. House of Representatives from Ohio
- In office March 4, 1861 – March 3, 1865
- Preceded by: Thomas Clarke Theaker
- Succeeded by: Ephraim R. Eckley
- Constituency: 17th district (1861–1863); 15th district (1863–1865)

Member of the Ohio House of Representatives from Monroe County
- In office December 4, 1848 – December 2, 1849
- Preceded by: William Johnson
- Succeeded by: William Johnson

Personal details
- Born: James Remley Morris; January 10, 1819 Rogersville, Pennsylvania
- Died: December 24, 1899 (aged 80) Woodsfield, Ohio
- Resting place: Morris Cemetery, Woodsfield
- Party: Democratic

James Remley Morris (January 10, 1819 – December 24, 1899) was an American lawyer and politician who served as a U.S. representative from Ohio during the Civil War from 1861 to 1865.

He was the son of Joseph Morris, who was also a member of Congress.

== Early life and career ==
Born in Rogersville, Pennsylvania, Morris attended the public schools. He moved with his parents to Waynesburg, Ohio, in 1829. He moved to Woodsfield, Ohio the next year. He served two years' apprenticeship at the printing trade in 1833 and 1834. He studied under private tutor until 1839. He studied law.

He was admitted to the bar in 1843 and commenced practice at Woodsfield.

== Political career ==
He was appointed county treasurer to fill the unexpired term of his father, who had been elected to Congress. He was editor and manager of the Spirit of Democracy from 1844 to 1848.

=== State offices ===
He served as member of the State house of representatives in 1848, then as a member of the Ohio State Board of Equalization in 1859.

=== Congress ===
Morris was elected as a Democrat to the Thirty-seventh and Thirty-eighth Congresses (March 4, 1861 – March 3, 1865). He was an unsuccessful candidate for reelection in 1864 to the Thirty-ninth Congress.

== Later career and death ==
He resumed the practice of his profession at Woodsfield. He served as judge of the probate court from 1872 to 1877, then as Postmaster from 1886 to 1889.

=== Death ===
He died in Woodsfield, Ohio, on December 24, 1899, and was interred in Morris Cemetery, near Woodsfield.

== Sources ==
- United States Congress. "James R. Morris (id: M000978)". Biographical Directory of the United States Congress.

U.S. House of Representatives
Preceded by Thomas Clarke Theaker	United States Representative from Ohio's 17th congressional district March 4, 1861-March 3, 1863	Succeeded by Ephraim R. Eckley
Preceded by Robert H. Nugen	United States Representative from Ohio's 15th congressional district March 4, 1863–March 3, 1865	Succeeded by Tobias A. Plants
Ohio House of Representatives
Preceded by William Johnson	Representative from Monroe County; December 4, 1848-December 2, 1849	Succeeded by William Johnson
