= Scott Covered Bridge =

Scott Covered Bridge may refer to:

- Scott Covered Bridge (Rogersville, Pennsylvania), listed on the National Register of Historic Places in Greene County, Pennsylvania
- Scott Covered Bridge (Townshend, Vermont), listed on the National Register of Historic Places in Windham County, Vermont
