= Keith Lawrence =

Keith Lawrence may refer to:

- Keith Lawrence (RAF officer) (1919–2016), Royal Air Force officer
- Keith Lawrence (politician) (1891–1978), Democratic politician from Ohio
- Keith Lawrence (rugby), in 1987 Rugby World Cup
- Keith Lawrence (footballer) (born 1954), English football centre back
