= Charles J. Albright =

American politician (1816–1883)

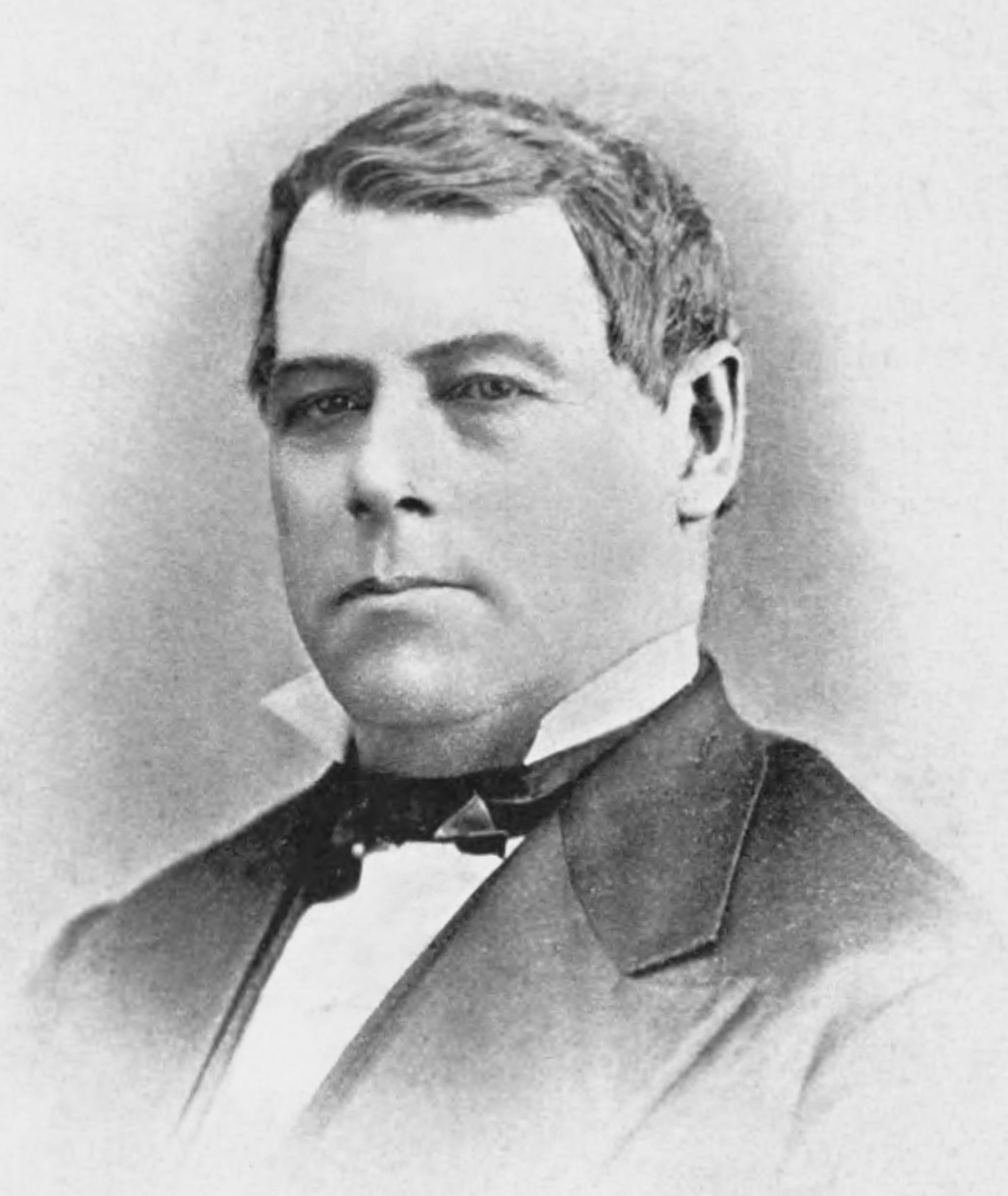

Member of the U.S. House of Representatives from Ohio's 17th district
- In office March 4, 1855 – March 3, 1857
- Preceded by: Wilson Shannon
- Succeeded by: William Lawrence

Personal details
- Born: Charles Jefferson Albright; May 9, 1816 Carlisle, Pennsylvania, US
- Died: October 21, 1883 (aged 67) Cambridge, Ohio, US
- Resting place: South Cemetery
- Party: Anti-Nebraska; Republican

Charles Jefferson Albright (May 9, 1816 – October 21, 1883) was a 19th-century American newspaperman and politician who served one term as a U.S. representative from Ohio from 1855 to 1857.

== Biography ==
Born in Carlisle, Pennsylvania, Albright moved with his parents in 1824 to Allegheny County, Pennsylvania. He received a limited schooling. He was employed in a harness shop and as a clerk in a rural store. Apprenticed as a printer. He moved to Guernsey County, Ohio, in 1832 and settled on a farm near Cambridge. He was owner and publisher of the Guernsey Times from 1840 to 1845 and from 1848 to 1855. He served as secretary of the Guernsey County Board of School Examiners from 1841 to 1844.

=== Congress ===
Albright was elected as an Anti-Nebraska candidate to the Thirty-fourth Congress (March 4, 1855 – March 3, 1857). He was an unsuccessful candidate for reelection in 1856 to the Thirty-fifth Congress.

He served as vice president at the Republican State convention in 1855. He served as delegate to the first and second Republican National Conventions in 1856 and 1860.

=== Later career ===
During the Civil War served as chairman of the Guernsey County Military Committee. Internal revenue collector for the sixteenth Ohio district, by appointment of President Lincoln from 1862 to 1869. He served as delegate to the third State constitutional convention in 1873. He served as member of the State board of charities in 1875. He served as president of the board of school examiners of the Cambridge Union School from 1881 to 1883.

=== Death and burial ===
He died in Cambridge, Ohio, October 21, 1883. He was interred in South Cemetery.

== Sources ==
- United States Congress. "Charles J. Albright (id: A000078)". Biographical Directory of the United States Congress.

U.S. House of Representatives
Preceded by Wilson Shannon	Member of the U.S. House of Representatives from Ohio's 17th congressional district March 4, 1855 - March 3, 1857	Succeeded by William Lawrence
