= Nettie Woods Covered Bridge =

- U.S. National Register of Historic Places
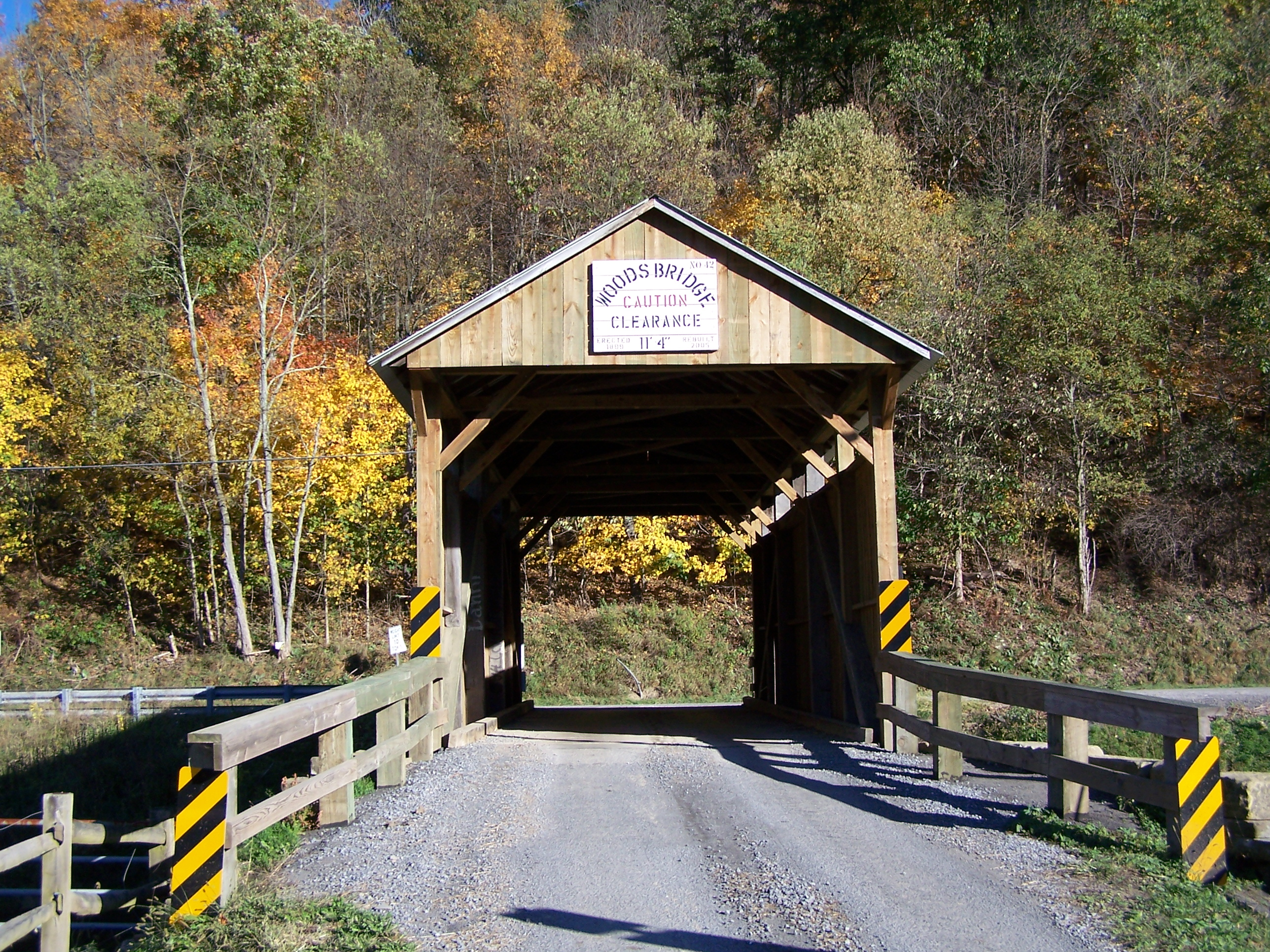
- Woods Covered Bridge, October 2007

- Location within Pennsylvania Location within the United States
- Location: North of Oak Forest at the crossing of Pursley Creek, Center Township, Pennsylvania
- Coordinates: 39.86297°N 80.23422°W
- Area: 0.1 acres (0.040 ha)
- Built by: Lisbon Scott
- Architectural style: Queenpost truss
- MPS: Covered Bridges of Washington and Greene Counties TR
- NRHP reference No.: 79003818
- Added to NRHP: June 22, 1979

Nettie Woods Covered Bridge is a historic wooden covered bridge located at Center Township in Greene County, Pennsylvania. It is a 40-foot-long (12 m), Queenpost truss bridge with a tin covered gable roof, constructed in 1882. It crosses Pursley Creek. As of October 1978, it was one of nine historic covered bridges in Greene County.

It was listed on the National Register of Historic Places in 1979.
