= James Lawrence (Ohio politician) =

American judge and politician

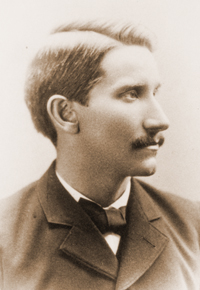

17th Ohio Attorney General
- In office January 14, 1884 – January 11, 1886
- Governor: George Hoadly
- Preceded by: David Hollingsworth
- Succeeded by: Jacob A. Kohler

Personal details
- Born: January 15, 1851 Old Washington, Ohio, U.S.
- Died: July 4, 1914 (aged 63) Brookside, West Virginia, U.S.
- Party: Democratic
- Spouse: Jennie Gardner Porter
- Children: three
- Education: Kenyon College
- Occupation: Lawyer, Judge, Law Professor

James Lawrence (January 15, 1851 – July 4, 1914) was a Democratic politician from the state of Ohio. He was Ohio Attorney General 1884–1886.

== Biography ==
James Lawrence was born January 15, 1851, at Old Washington, Guernsey County, Ohio, son of Congressman William Lawrence. He attended public schools and graduated from Kenyon College in 1871. At college he was a member of Theta Delta Chi and Phi Alpha Delta.

He then studied law at Cambridge, Ohio under Joseph W. White, and was admitted to the bar in 1874. He moved to Cleveland, Ohio and entered the law office of G. H. Foster, eventually becoming his partner, and remained so until 1893. He then became head of Lawrence and Estep.

In 1883 Lawrence was nominated by the Democratic Party for Attorney General, and defeated Republican Moses B. Earnhart in the general election. In 1885, he ran again and was defeated by Republican Jacob A. Kohler. In 1888 he married the grandniece of Rev. Cyrus Yale, Jennie Gardner Porter, granddaughter of Eunice Yale, son of Capt. Josiah Yale.

They had three children together. Their names were Harriet, and twins Keith and Margaret R. In 1893 and 1894 he was Corporate Council of the City of Cleveland. From 1896 to 1911, Lawrence was professor of law at Western Reserve University.

In 1902 he was elected Common Pleas Judge, and was elected again in 1910. He served until his death July 4, 1914. He died at Brookside, West Virginia while on vacation with his wife.

He was a Freemason.

== Notes ==
Legal offices
Preceded by David Hollingsworth	Attorney General of Ohio; 1884–1886	Succeeded by Jacob A. Kohler
