= Jacob A. Kohler =

American politician

Jacob Adams Kohler
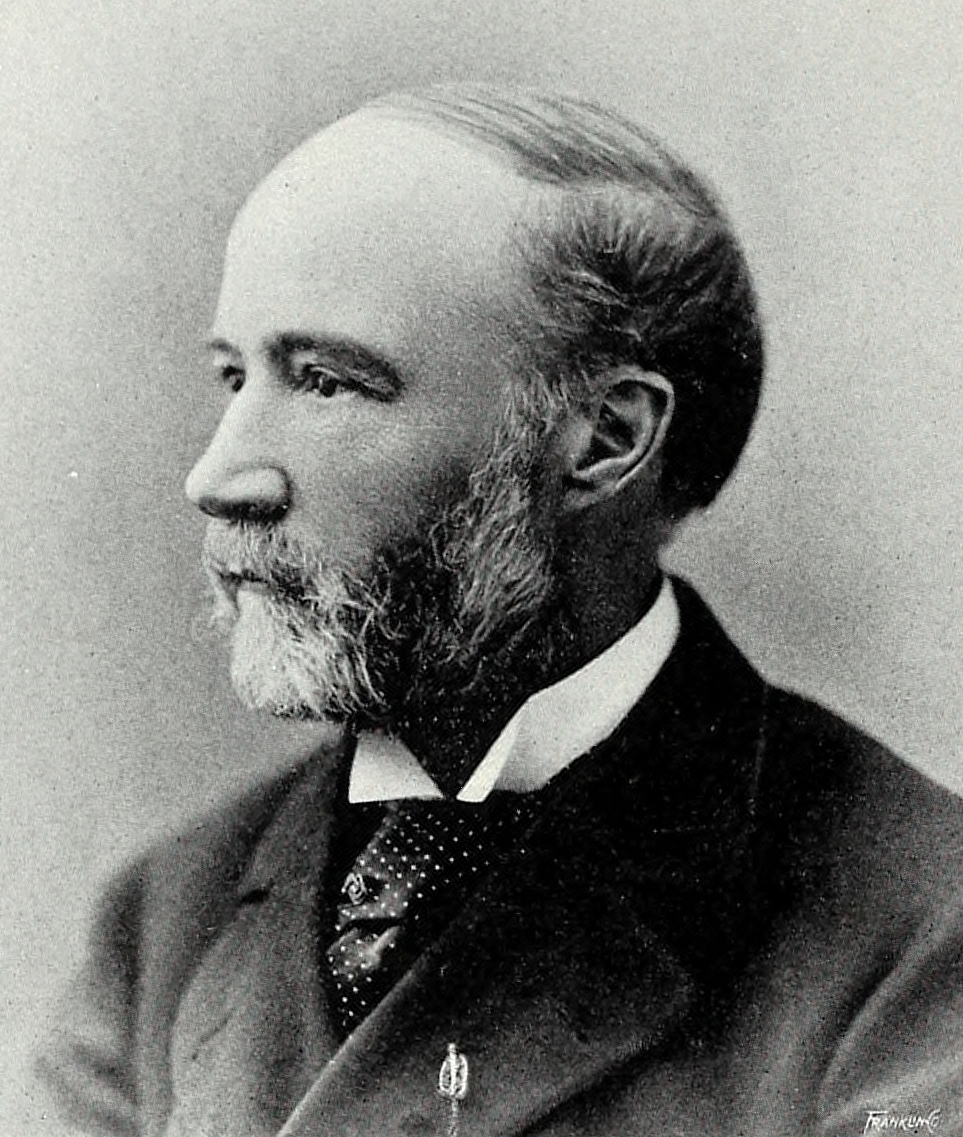
- circa 1896

18th Ohio Attorney General
- In office January 11, 1886 – January 9, 1888
- Governor: Joseph B. Foraker
- Preceded by: James Lawrence
- Succeeded by: David K. Watson

Member of the Ohio House of Representatives from the Summit County district
- In office January 7, 1884 – January 3, 1886
- Preceded by: John Park Alexander
- Succeeded by: Frank M. Green

Personal details
- Born: August 15, 1835 Reading, Pennsylvania, US
- Died: March 15, 1916 (aged 80) Akron, Ohio, US
- Resting place: Glendale Cemetery, Akron
- Party: Republican
- Spouse: Frances H. Coburn
- Children: two

Jacob Adams Kohler was a Republican politician from the state of Ohio. He was Ohio Attorney General from 1886 to 1887.

== Biography ==
Kohler was born August 15, 1835, at Reading, Pennsylvania. When he was four months old, his family moved to Franklin Township, Summit County, Ohio. He received a public education and went to Lodi Academy. In 1859, he was admitted to the bar, and served as Prosecuting Attorney of Summit County two terms. His first law partner was Sidney Edgerton. Kohler married Frances H. Coburn May 16, 1860, and had two sons.

In 1883 he was elected to the Ohio House of Representatives for the Sixty-sixth General Assembly. In 1885 he was elected Ohio Attorney General. In 1895, he was elected a Common Pleas Court Judge.

He died March 15, 1916, at his Akron home.

== Notes ==
Legal offices
Preceded by James Lawrence	Attorney General of Ohio; 1886–1888	Succeeded by David K. Watson
