= Shriver Covered Bridge =

- U.S. National Register of Historic Places
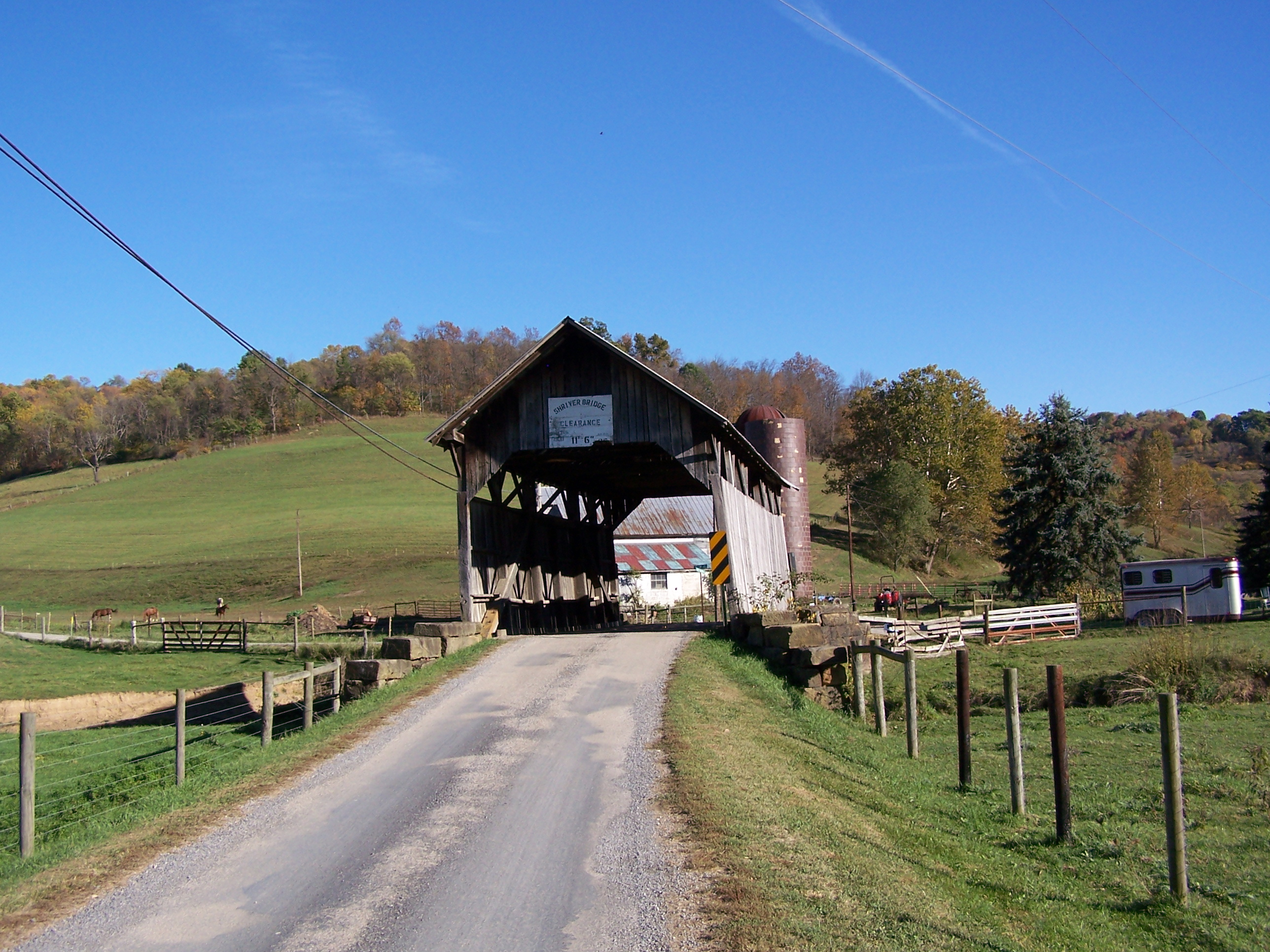
- Shriver Covered Bridge, October 2007

- Location within Pennsylvania Location within the United States
- Location: South of Rogersville at the crossing of Harqus Creek, Center Township, Pennsylvania
- Coordinates: 39°51′9″N 80°16′46″W
- Area: 0.1 acres (0.040 ha)
- Architectural style: Queenpost truss
- MPS: Covered Bridges of Washington and Greene Counties TR
- NRHP reference No.: 79003821
- Added to NRHP: June 22, 1979

Shriver Covered Bridge is a historic wooden covered bridge located at Center Township in Greene County, Pennsylvania. It is a 40-foot-long (12 m), Queenpost truss bridge with a tin covered gable roof, constructed in 1900. It crosses Harqus Creek. As of October 1978, it was one of nine historic covered bridges in Greene County.

It was listed on the National Register of Historic Places in 1979.
