= David K. Watson =

American politician

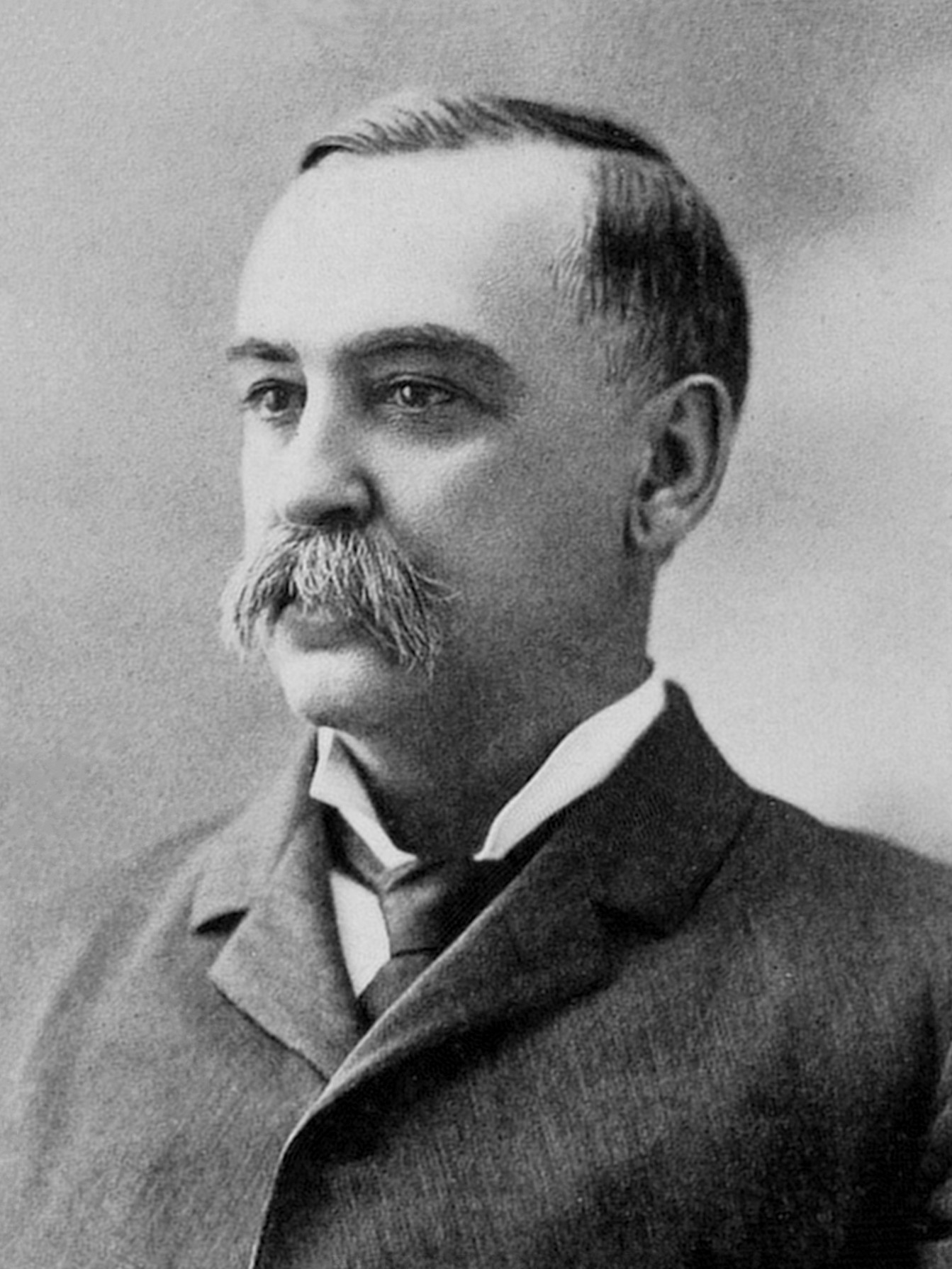

Member of the U.S. House of Representatives from Ohio's 12th district
- In office March 4, 1895 – March 3, 1897
- Preceded by: Joseph H. Outhwaite
- Succeeded by: John J. Lentz

19th Ohio Attorney General
- In office January 9, 1888 – January 11, 1892
- Governor: Joseph B. Foraker; James E. Campbell
- Preceded by: Jacob A. Kohler
- Succeeded by: John K. Richards

Personal details
- Born: David Kemper Watson; June 18, 1849 London, Ohio, U.S.
- Died: September 28, 1918 (aged 69) Columbus, Ohio, U.S.
- Resting place: Green Lawn Cemetery, Columbus, Ohio
- Party: Republican
- Spouse: Louise M. Harrison
- Children: two
- Education: Dickinson College

David Kemper Watson (June 18, 1849 – September 28, 1918) was an American lawyer and politician who served one term as a U.S. representative from Ohio from 1895 to 1897.

== Biography ==
Born near London, Ohio, Watson was graduated from Dickinson College, Carlisle, Pennsylvania, in 1871 and from the law department of Boston University in 1873. He was admitted to the bar and commenced practice.

He served as assistant United States district attorney for the southern district of Ohio during the administration of President Arthur.

=== Early political career ===
Watson was elected attorney general of Ohio in 1887 and reelected in 1889. In 1890, he successfully prosecuted the Standard Oil Company under the Sherman Antitrust Act, leading the court to dissolve the trust. He served as special counsel for the United States in the suits brought by the Government against the Pacific railroads in 1892.

=== Congress ===
Watson was elected as a Republican to the Fifty-fourth Congress (March 4, 1895 – March 3, 1897).

He was an unsuccessful candidate for reelection in 1896 to the Fifty-fifth Congress.

=== Later career ===
He was appointed by President William McKinley as a member of the commission to revise and codify the laws of the United States.

He resumed the practice of law.

== Death and burial ==
He died in Columbus, Ohio, September 28, 1918. He was interred in Green Lawn Cemetery.

== Family ==
Watson was married to Louise M. Harrison, daughter of Hon. Richard A. Harrison of Columbus, Ohio, in 1873, and had a son and a daughter.

== Publications ==
- Watson, David K. (1890). "The Early Judiciary, Early Laws and Bar of Ohio". Ohio Archaeological and Historical Publications. 3: 141–160.
- David K. Watson (1910). The constitution of the united states: its history, application and construction. Imprenta: Chicago, Callaghan, 1910.

== Sources ==
- United States Congress. "David K. Watson (id: W000200)". Biographical Directory of the United States Congress.

Legal offices
Preceded by Jacob A. Kohler	Attorney General of Ohio; 1888–1892	Succeeded by John K. Richards
U.S. House of Representatives
Preceded by Joseph H. Outhwaite	Member of the U.S. House of Representatives from Ohio's 12th congressional district March 4, 1895 – March 3, 1897	Succeeded by John J. Lentz
