= Thomas Clarke Theaker =

American politician

Thomas C. Theaker
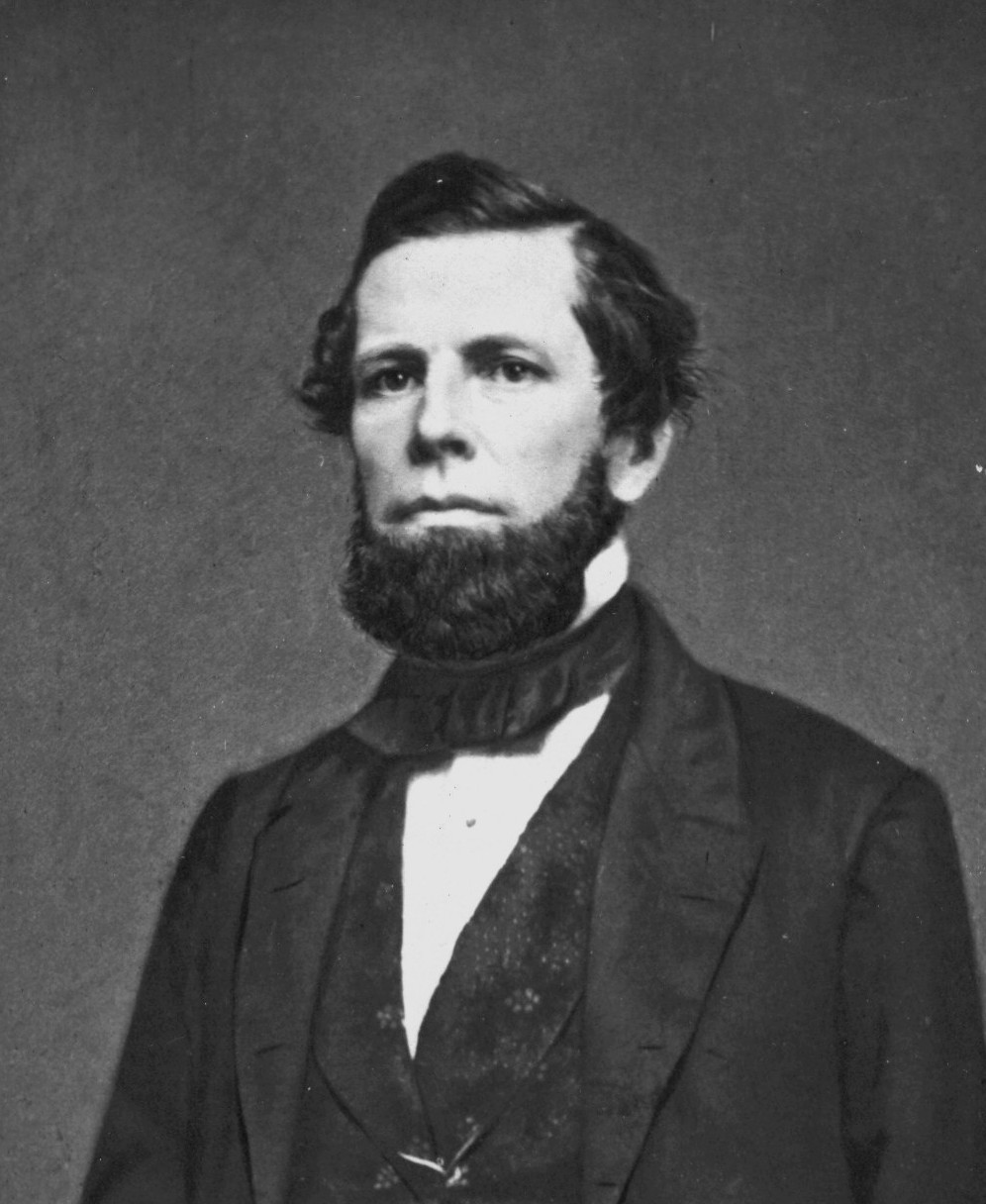

Member of the U.S. House of Representatives from Ohio's 17th district
- In office March 4, 1859 – March 3, 1861
- Preceded by: William Lawrence
- Succeeded by: James R. Morris

Commissioner of United States Patent Office
- In office August 17, 1865 – January 20, 1868
- Appointed by: Andrew Johnson
- Preceded by: David P. Holloway
- Succeeded by: Elisha Foote

Personal details
- Born: Thomas Clarke Theaker; February 4, 1812 York, Pennsylvania, US
- Died: July 16, 1883 (aged 71) Oakland, Maryland, US
- Resting place: Weeks Cemetery, Bridgeport, Ohio, US
- Party: Republican

Thomas Clarke Theaker (February 4, 1812 – July 16, 1883) was an American politician who served one term as U.S. Congressman from 1859 to 1861. He also served as commissioner of the United States Patent Office from 1865 to 1868.

== Biography ==
Theaker was a native of York, Pennsylvania, but moved to Bridgeport, Ohio, in 1830, where he became a wheelwright and machinist.

=== Congress ===
Elected as a Republican to represent the Seventeenth Congressional District of Ohio in the Thirty-Sixth Congress.

=== Later career ===
He failed to win re-election in 1860 and was later appointed to a seat on the U.S. Patent Office's Board of Appeals. On August 15, 1865, he was appointed commissioner of the Patent Office, a post he held until his resignation in January 1868.

=== Death and burial ===
He died in Oakland, Maryland on July 16, 1883, at the age of 71. He was interred in Weeks Cemetery in Bridgeport, Ohio.

== Sources ==
- United States Congress. "Thomas Clarke Theaker (id: T000151)". Biographical Directory of the United States Congress.

U.S. House of Representatives
Preceded by William Lawrence	Member of the U.S. House of Representatives from Ohio's 17th congressional district March 4, 1859 - March 3, 1861	Succeeded by James R. Morris
