= Keith Lawrence (politician) =

American politician

Francis Keith Lawrence (April 4, 1891 – November 22, 1978) was a Democratic politician from Cleveland, Ohio, United States who served in the Ohio House of Representatives, and in the Ohio State Senate, including two years as President of the Senate.

== Biography ==
Keith Lawrence was born in Cleveland, the son of James Lawrence and Jennie Gardner Porter Lawrence. His father was previously Ohio Attorney General, and his grandfather, William Lawrence had served in Congress. His twin sister, Margaret R. Lawrence was assistant prosecuting attorney of Cuyahoga County, Ohio. Keith Lawrence attended public schools in Cleveland, and graduated AB from Hobart College in 1913. He received a LL.B. from Western Reserve University Franklin Thomas Backus School of Law in 1916.

During World War I, Lawrence served as an ensign in the United States Naval Reserve Force. He practiced as a member of Schafer & Lawrence, downtown Cleveland. He was elected as a Cuyahoga County Representative in 1930 to the Ohio House of Representatives for the 89th General Assembly, 1931–1932. Re-elected in 1932, he served as speaker pro-tem in the 90th General Assembly. In 1934 and 1936 he was elected to the Ohio State Senate for the 91st and 92nd General Assemblies, serving as president in the 92nd, 1937–1938. He also served in the state convention of 1933 which ratified the repeal of the Eighteenth Amendment to the Federal Constitution.

Keith Lawrence married Elizabeth Graham Scott of Cleveland September 25, 1920, and they had two daughters. He was a member of the Calvary Presbyterian Church, American Legion, Veterans of Foreign Wars, B.P.O.E., and Ohio State Bar Association.

He died November 22, 1978, at Mayfield Heights, Ohio.

Ohio Senate
Preceded by Paul P. Yoder	President of the Senate; 1937-1938	Succeeded by Frank E. Whittemore
