= Holbrook, Pennsylvania =

Unincorporated community in Pennsylvania, US

- Unincorporated community
- Location within Pennsylvania
- Coordinates: 39°51′19″N 80°18′49″W
- Country: United States
- State: Pennsylvania
- County: Greene
- Elevation: 1,001 ft (305 m)
- Time zone: UTC-5 (Eastern (EST))
  - Summer (DST): UTC-4 (EDT)
- ZIP code: 15341
- Area codes: 724, 878
- GNIS feature ID: 1203824

Holbrook is an unincorporated community in Greene County, Pennsylvania, United States. The community is located along Pennsylvania Route 18, 7.7 miles (12.4 km) west-southwest of Waynesburg. Holbrook has a post office, with ZIP code 15341, which opened on June 10, 1869.
