= Rogersville, Pennsylvania =

Unincorporated community in Pennsylvania, US

- Census-designated place
- Location within Pennsylvania Location within the United States
- Coordinates: 39°52′50″N 80°16′10″W
- Country: United States
- State: Pennsylvania
- County: Greene
- Township: Center

Area
  - Total: 0.39 sq mi (1.00 km^{2})
  - Land: 0.39 sq mi (1.00 km^{2})
  - Water: 0 sq mi (0.00 km^{2})
- Elevation: 1,056 ft (322 m)

Population (2020)
  - Total: 215
  - Density: 555.4/sq mi (214.45/km^{2})
- Time zone: UTC-5 (Eastern (EST))
  - Summer (DST): UTC-4 (EDT)
- ZIP code: 15359
- FIPS code: 42-65848
- GNIS feature ID: 2630036

Rogersville is an unincorporated community and census-designated place (CDP) in Center Township, Greene County, Pennsylvania, United States. It is located 6 miles (10 km) west of the borough of Waynesburg (the Greene County seat) along Pennsylvania Route 18. As of the 2010 census the population was 249.

== Demographics ==
Historical population
Census	Pop.	Note	%±
2010	249		—
2020	215		−13.7%
U.S. Decennial Census
