= William Lawrence (Ohio Democrat) =

American politician

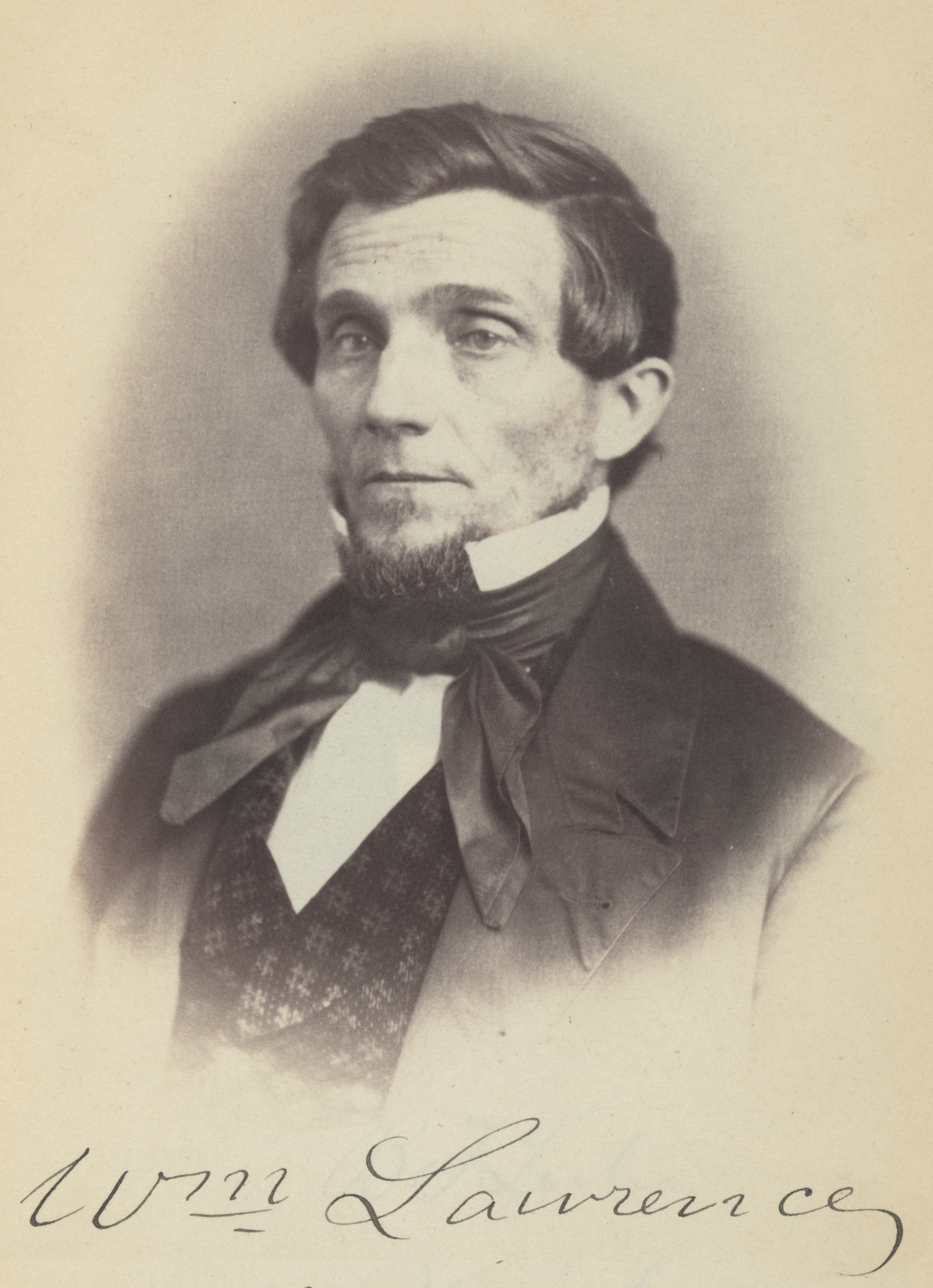
- in 35th Congress

Member of the U.S. House of Representatives from Ohio's 17th district
- In office March 4, 1857 – March 3, 1859
- Preceded by: Charles J. Albright
- Succeeded by: Thomas Clarke Theaker

Member of the Ohio House of Representatives from the Guernsey County district
- In office December 4, 1843 – December 1, 1844
- Preceded by: William Douglas
- Succeeded by: William Skinner

Member of the Ohio Senate from the 19th district
- In office January 7, 1856 – March 4, 1857
- Preceded by: Western T. Sinclair
- Succeeded by: M. Morron
- In office January 6, 1868 – January 2, 1870
- Preceded by: R. Savage
- Succeeded by: James O. Amos
- In office January 4, 1886 – January 1, 1888
- Preceded by: inactive
- Succeeded by: David H. Mortley

Personal details
- Born: September 2, 1814 Old Washington, Ohio
- Died: September 8, 1895 (aged 81) Old Washington, Ohio
- Resting place: Washington Cemetery, Old Washington
- Party: Democratic
- Children: James Lawrence
- Education: Jefferson College

William Lawrence (September 2, 1814 – September 8, 1895) was a state legislator and one-term member of the United States House of Representatives from the 17th district of Ohio, serving from 1857 to 1859.

He also served as President of the board of directors of the Ohio Penitentiary.

== Biography ==
Lawrence was born in Washington, Guernsey County, Ohio. He graduated from Jefferson College (now Washington & Jefferson College) in Canonsburg, Pennsylvania in 1835.

=== Early political career ===
After farming for a few years, Lawrence was elected to the Ohio House of Representatives in 1843. He was a Presidential elector in 1848 for Secretary of State Lewis Cass, and Congressman William Orlando Butler. He was a delegate to the Ohio State constitutional convention in 1851. From 1856 to 1857, he served in the Ohio Senate.

=== Congress ===
On March 4, 1857, William Lawrence (D) was sworn-in as the Representative from the 17th Congressional District of Ohio to the 35th U.S. Congress. Lawrence served only in this Congress, as he was elected only to one term in office.

=== Later career ===
Upon leaving Congress, Lawrence served again in the Ohio Senate (in 1867, 1885, and 1886).

He also served as president of the board of directors of the Ohio Penitentiary, a prison in downtown Columbus, Ohio.

=== Death and burial ===
William Lawrence died in Old Washington, Ohio on September 8, 1895, and is interred at the Washington Cemetery.

=== Family ===
Lawrence was father of Ohio Attorney General James Lawrence.

Ohio House of Representatives
Preceded by William Douglas	Member of the Ohio House of Representatives; Guernsey County; 1843-1844	Succeeded by William Skinner
Ohio Senate
Preceded by Western T. Sinclair	Member of the Ohio Senate; 19th district 1856-1857	Succeeded by M. Morron
Preceded by R. Savage	Member of the Ohio Senate; 19th district 1868-1870	Succeeded by James O. Amos
Preceded by inactive	Member of the Ohio Senate; 19th district 1886-1888	Succeeded by David H. Mortley
U.S. House of Representatives
Preceded by Charles J. Albright	Member of the U.S. House of Representatives from Ohio's 17th congressional district March 4, 1857 - March 3, 1859	Succeeded by Thomas C. Theaker
