= Scott Covered Bridge (Rogersville, Pennsylvania) =

- U.S. National Register of Historic Places
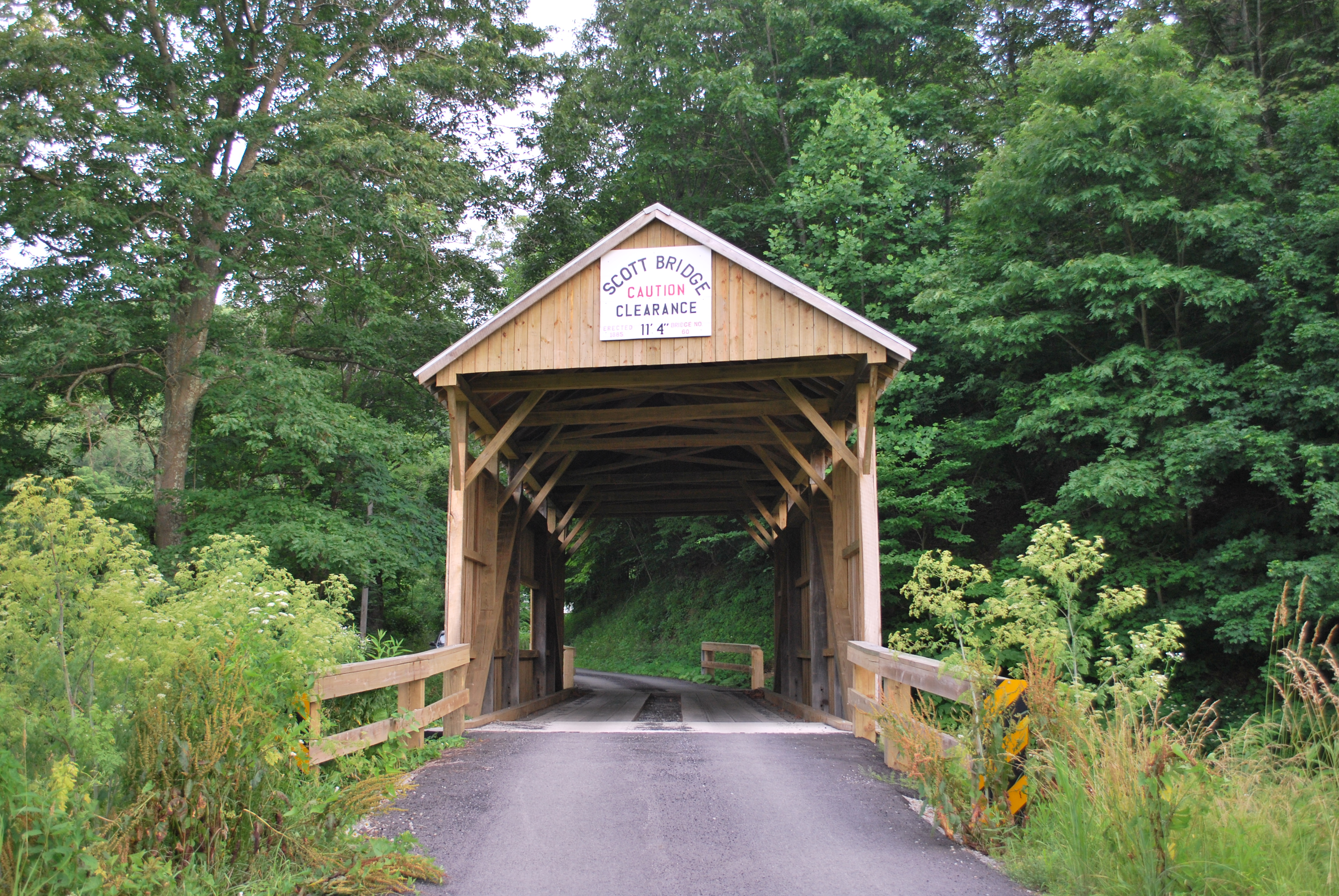
- Scott Covered Bridge, June 2009

- Location within Pennsylvania Location within the United States
- Location: Covered Bridge Road off Pennsylvania Route 21 at the crossing of Ten Mile Creek, west of Rogersville, Center Township, Pennsylvania
- Coordinates: 39°53′15″N 80°19′33″W
- Area: 0.1 acres (0.040 ha)
- Built by: William Lang
- Architectural style: Queenpost truss
- MPS: Covered Bridges of Washington and Greene Counties TR
- NRHP reference No.: 79003819
- Added to NRHP: June 22, 1979

Scott Covered Bridge is a historic wooden covered bridge located at Center Township in Greene County, Pennsylvania. It is a 41-foot-long (12 m), Queenpost truss bridge with a raised seam tin covered gable roof, constructed in 1885. It crosses Ten Mile Creek. As of October 1978, it was one of nine historic covered bridges in Greene County.

It was listed on the National Register of Historic Places in 1979.
