= Ohio State Auditor elections =

Elections for state auditor in Ohio, USA

Seal of the Ohio State Auditor

The voters of the U.S. state of Ohio elect a state auditor for a four-year term.

Year	Democratic	Republican	Other
2022	Taylor Sappington: 1,683,216	Keith Faber: 2,397,207	
2018	Zack Space: 1,946,544	Keith Faber: 2,110,073	Robert C. Coogan (Libertarian): 169,767
2014	John Patrick Carney	Dave Yost	Bob Bridges (Libertarian)
2010	David Pepper : 1,683,330	Dave Yost : 1,882,010	L. Michael Howard (Libertarian) : 182,534
2006	Barbara Sykes: 1,891,874	Mary Taylor: 1,940,665	Donald Lesiak (Green)
2002	Helen Knipe Smith: 1,114,957	Betty D. Montgomery: 2,010,022	
1998	Louis N. Strike: 1,191,250	James M. Petro: 1,975,793	
1994	Randall W. Sweeney: 1,337,558	James M. Petro: 1,883,852	
1990	Thomas E. Ferguson: 1,768,343	James M. Petro: 1,580,497	
1986	Thomas E. Ferguson: 2,005,306	Ben Rose: 1,012,037	
1982	Thomas E. Ferguson: 1,692,670	Vincent C. Campanella: 1,550,227	
1978	Thomas E. Ferguson: 1,455,219	Donald E. "Buz" Lukens: 1,177,329	
1974	Thomas E. Ferguson: 1,561,709	Roger W. Tracy, Jr.: 1,243,459	
1970	Joseph T. Ferguson: 1,484,610	Roger W. Tracy, Jr.: 1,434,105	
1966	Thomas E. Ferguson: 1,196,780	Roger Cloud: 1,527,673	
1966	Clarence H. Knisley: 1,170,788	Archer E. Reilly: 1,435,506	
1962	John W. Donahey: 1,372,581	Roger W. Tracy: 1,521,030	
1960	James D. Ferguson: 1,540,241	James A. Rhodes: 2,288,611	
1956	Joseph T. Ferguson: 1,517,424	James A. Rhodes: 1,829,305	
1952	Joseph T. Ferguson: 1,513,230	James A. Rhodes: 1,832,769	
1948	Joseph T. Ferguson: 1,550,899	Roger W. Tracy: 1,259,047	
1944	Joseph T. Ferguson: 1,504,141	Roger W. Tracy: 1,423,901	
1940	Joseph T. Ferguson: 1,525,839	Joseph T. Tracy: 1,479,840	
1920	Daniel E. Butler : 754,581	Joseph T. Tracy : 1,126,321	Louis H. Neff : 43,691; L.R. Tripp : 1,373
1916	A. Victor Donahey : 577,044	Hays M. Adams : 532,178	Sigfried Newbauer : 37,898; Will D. Scott : 6,692
1912	A. Victor Donahey	Edward M. Fullington	Charles L. Allen (Progressive)
1908	William W. Durbin : 524,954	Edward M. Fullington : 547,970	John P. McGuire (Soc) : 31,832; Joseph R. Stratton (Pro) : 11,385; Mark W. Madge (Ind) : 591; John A. Sheffield (Peoples) : 168; Bernard S. Frayne (Soc Lab) : 832
1903	Charles A. Kloeb : 357,201	Walter D. Guilbert : 473,565	Henry H. Smith (Soc) : 14,203; Albanus C. Purvis (Pro) : 13,453; William Garrity (Soc Lab) : 2,173
1899	George W. Sigafoos	Walter D. Guilbert	
1895	James W. Knott : 329,420	Walter D. Guilbert : 427,457	
1891	Thomas E. Peckinpaugh : 345,611	Ebenezer W. Poe : 373,838	
1887	Emil Kiesewetter : 327,821	Ebenezer W. Poe : 356,793	
1883	Emil Kiesewetter : 360,319	John F. Oglevee : 346,923	
1879	Charles Reemelin : 317,442	John F. Oglevee : 335,184	
1875	Edward M. Green : 292,271	James Williams : 296,210	
1871	Joseph R. Cockerill : 217,833	James Williams : 237,809	
1867	John McElwee : 240,840	James H. Godman : 243,461	
1863	William B. Hubbard : 188,310	James H. Godman : 284,909	
1859	G. V. Dorsey : 170,586	Robert Walker Tayler, Sr. : 184,321	
1855	William Duane Morgan : 134,504	Francis Mastin Wright : 169,218	
1851	William Duane Morgan : 145,617	Jacob Heaton (freesoil) : 13,663	John Woods (Whig) : 123,583
