= 1974 Ohio State Auditor election =

- November 5, 1974

Nominee	Thomas E. Ferguson	Roger Tracy
Party	Democratic	Republican
Popular vote	1,561,709	1,242,459
Percentage	55.69%	44.31%
- County results Ferguson: 50–60% 60–70% Tracy: 50–60% 60–70%
State Auditor before election
Joseph T. Ferguson
Democratic
Elected State Auditor
Thomas E. Ferguson
Democratic

The 1974 Ohio State Auditor election was held on November 5, 1974, to elect the Ohio State Auditor. Primaries were held on May 7, 1974. Incumbent Democratic Ohio State Auditor Joseph T. Ferguson chose not to seek re-election. His son, Democratic Deputy Auditor of State Thomas E. Ferguson, won the election, defeating the returning 1970 Republican nominee for this office, former Ohio State House Representative Roger Tracy, by 11 percentage points.

== Democratic primary ==
=== Candidates ===
- Thomas E. Ferguson, Deputy Auditor of State

=== Campaign ===
Ferguson won the nomination unopposed.

=== Results ===
Democratic primary results
Party	Candidate	Votes	%
Democratic	Thomas E. Ferguson	713,241	100.00%
Total votes		713,241	100.00%

== Republican primary ==
=== Candidates ===
- Roger Tracy, former Ohio State House Representative (1967–1970)
- Thomas A. Cloud, Montgomery County Commissioner (1969–1975)

=== Campaign ===
Tracy won the nomination over Cloud by six percentage points.

=== Results ===
Republican primary results
Party	Candidate	Votes	%
Republican	Roger Tracy	289,842	53.21%
Republican	Thomas A. Cloud	254,888	46.79%
Total votes		544,730	100.00%

== General election ==
=== Candidates ===
- Thomas E. Ferguson, Deputy Auditor of State (Democratic)
- Roger Tracy, former Ohio State House Representative (1967–1970)

=== Results ===
1974 Ohio State Auditor election results
Party	Candidate	Votes	%	±%
Democratic	Thomas E. Ferguson	1,561,709	55.69%	+4.82
Republican	Roger Tracy	1,242,459	44.31%	−4.82
Total votes		2,804,168	100.00%	
Democratic hold				
