= 1970 Ohio State Auditor election =

- November 3, 1970

Nominee	Joseph T. Ferguson	Roger Tracy
Party	Democratic	Republican
Popular vote	1,484,610	1,434,105
Percentage	50.87%	49.13%
- County results Ferguson: 50–60% 60–70% Tracy: 50–60% 60–70%
State Auditor before election
Roger Cloud
Republican
Elected State Auditor
Joseph T. Ferguson
Democratic

The 1970 Ohio State Auditor election was held on November 3, 1970, to elect the Ohio State Auditor. Primaries were held on May 5, 1970. Republican incumbent Ohio State Auditor Roger Cloud chose to unsuccessfully run for Ohio Attorney General rather than seek another term as Auditor. Democratic former Ohio State Auditor Joseph T. Ferguson won the election, defeating Republican Ohio State House Representative Roger Tracy by a narrow margin of just one percentage point.

== Republican primary ==
=== Candidates ===
- Roger Tracy, Ohio State House Representative (1967–1970)
- James J. Barton

=== Campaign ===
Tracy easily won the Republican nomination in a landslide over Barton, winning with nearly 80% of the vote.

=== Results ===
Republican primary results
Party	Candidate	Votes	%
Republican	Roger Tracy	633,977	79.19%
Republican	James J. Barton	166,639	20.81%
Total votes		800,616	100.00%

== Democratic primary ==
=== Candidates ===
- Joseph T. Ferguson, former Ohio State Treasurer (1959–1963), former Ohio State Auditor (1937–1953)
- Samuel H. Rugg
- Shaw A. Ferguson

=== Campaign ===
Ferguson easily won the nomination by over 40 percentage points against his two primary opponents.

=== Results ===
Democratic primary results
Party	Candidate	Votes	%
Democratic	Joseph T. Ferguson	468,398	63.42%
Democratic	Samuel H. Rugg	138,888	18.81%
Democratic	Shaw A. Ferguson	131,225	17.77%
Total votes		738,511	100.00%

== General election ==
=== Candidates ===
- Joseph T. Ferguson, former Ohio State Treasurer (1959–1963), former Ohio State Auditor (1937–1953) (Democratic)
- Roger Tracy, Ohio State House Representative (1967–1970) (Republican)

=== Results ===
1970 Ohio State Auditor election results
Party	Candidate	Votes	%	±%
Democratic	Joseph T. Ferguson	1,484,610	50.87%	+6.94
Republican	Roger Tracy	1,434,105	49.13%	−6.94
Total votes		2,918,715	100.00%	
Democratic gain from Republican				
