= Guilbert =

Guilbert is a French surname. Notable people with the surname include:

- Aimé-Victor-François Guilbert (1812–1889), French cardinal
- Ann Morgan Guilbert, American actress
- Frédéric Guilbert (born 1994), French soccer player
- Nelly Guilbert (born 1979), French soccer player
- René Charles Guilbert de Pixérécourt (1773–1844), French theatre director and playwright
- Walter D. Guilbert (1844–1911), American politician
- Yvette Guilbert, French singer and actress

== See also ==
- Guilbert and Betelle, an American architecture firm
- Guilbert (crater), a crater on Venus
- Gilbert (disambiguation)
