= Joseph Olds Gregg =

American Civil War Medal of Honor recipient (1841–1930)

Joseph O. Gregg
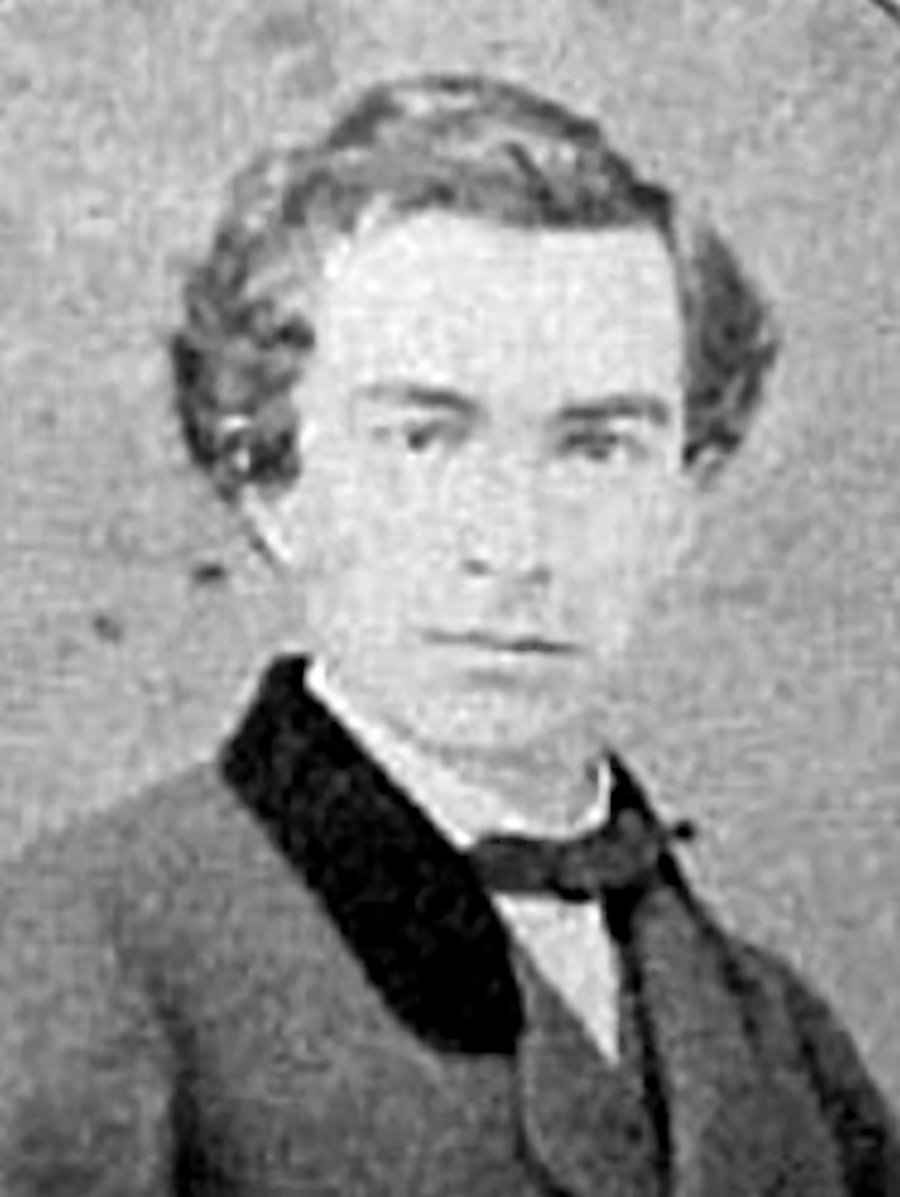
- Born: January 5, 1841; Lithopolis, Ohio
- Died: February 25, 1930 (aged 89)
- Burial place: Lithopolis, Ohio
- Military career
- Allegiance: United States
- Branch: United States Army
- Rank: Private
- Units: Company F, 133rd Ohio Infantry
- Conflicts: American Civil War
- Awards: Medal of Honor

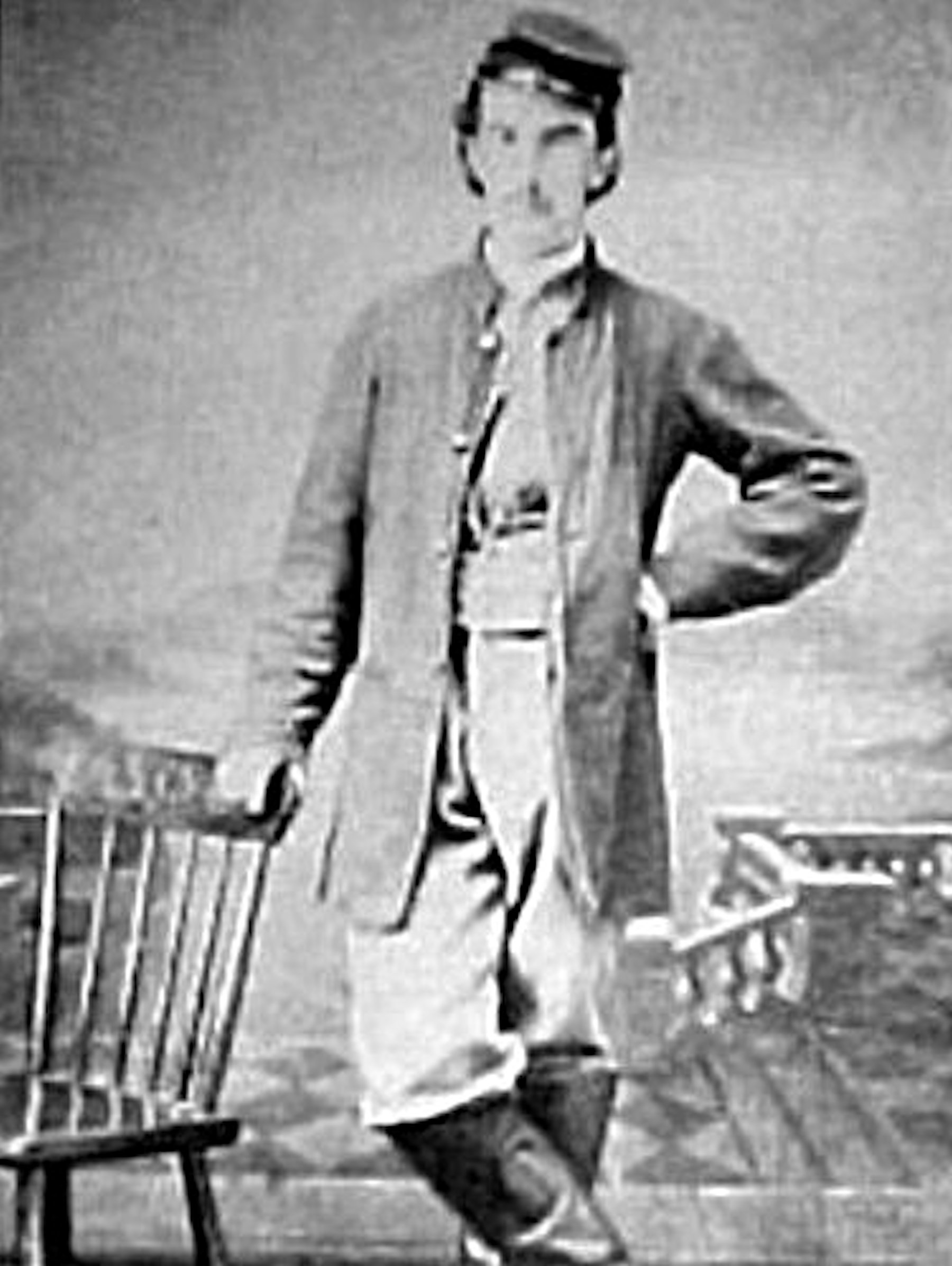
Medal of Honor winner Joseph Olds Gregg c1865

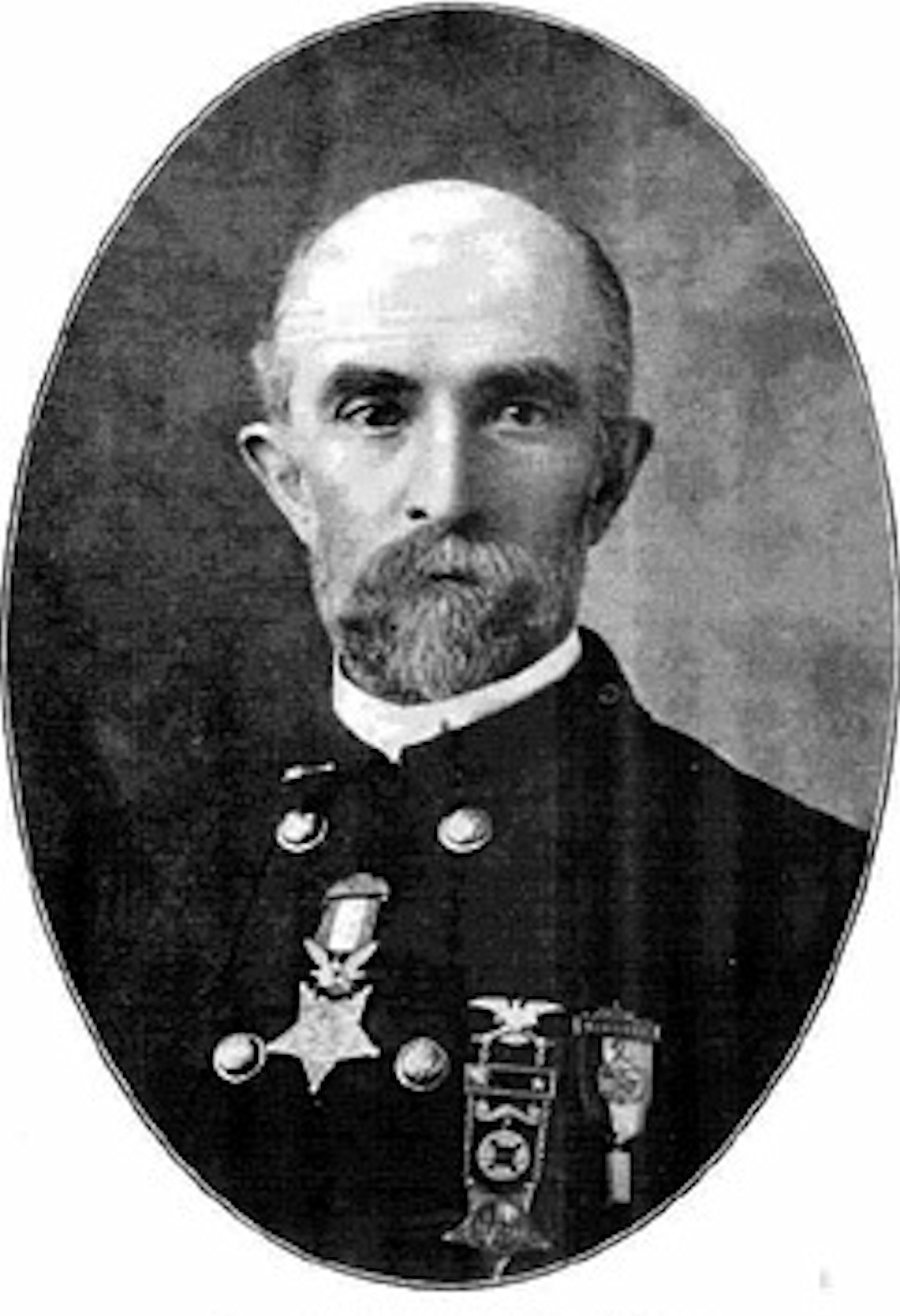
Medal of Honor winner Joseph Olds Gregg c1899

Joseph Olds Gregg (January 5, 1841 - February 25, 1930) was a Union Army soldier in the American Civil War who received the U.S. military's highest decoration, the Medal of Honor.

Gregg was born in Lithopolis, Ohio on January 5, 1841. He was awarded the Medal of Honor, for extraordinary heroism shown on June 16, 1864, while serving as a Private with Company F, 133rd Ohio Infantry, near the Richmond and Petersburg Ry., Virginia. His Medal of Honor was issued on May 13, 1899.

Gregg died at the age of 89, on February 25, 1930, and was buried at Lithopolis Cemetery in Lithopolis, Ohio.

== Medal of Honor citation ==
The President of the United States of America, in the name of Congress, takes pleasure in presenting the Medal of Honor to Private Joseph Olds Gregg, United States Army, for extraordinary heroism on 16 June 1864, while serving with Company F, 133d Ohio National Guard Infantry, in action at Richmond & Petersburg Railway, Virginia. Private Gregg voluntarily returned to the breastworks which his regiment had been forced to abandon to notify three missing companies that the regiment was falling back; found the enemy already in the works, refused a demand to surrender, returning to his command under a concentrated fire, several bullets passing through his hat and clothing.
