= 1986 Ohio State Auditor election =

- November 4, 1986

Nominee	Thomas E. Ferguson	Waldo Rose
Party	Democratic	Republican
Popular vote	2,005,306	1,012,037
Percentage	66.46%	33.54%
- County results Ferguson: 50–60% 60–70% 70–80% 80–90% Rose: 50–60%
State Auditor before election
Thomas E. Ferguson
Democratic
Elected State Auditor
Thomas E. Ferguson
Democratic

The 1986 Ohio State Auditor election was held on November 4, 1986, to elect the Ohio State Auditor. Primaries were held on May 6, 1986. Democratic incumbent Ohio State Auditor Thomas E. Ferguson won re-election in a landslide, defeating Republican Ohio State House Representative Waldo Rose by a two-to-one margin and sweeping every single county except for Allen County.

== Democratic primary ==
=== Candidates ===
- Thomas E. Ferguson, incumbent Ohio State Auditor (1975–1995)

=== Campaign ===
Ferguson won renomination unopposed.

=== Results ===
Democratic primary results
Party	Candidate	Votes	%
Democratic	Thomas E. Ferguson	631,864	82.62%
Total votes		631,864	100.00%

== Republican primary ==
=== Candidates ===
- Waldo Rose, Ohio State House Representative (1973–1986) (Write-in)

=== Campaign ===
Rose was the only one to run for the Republican nomination, running as a write-in candidate.

=== Results ===
Republican primary results
Party	Candidate	Votes	%
Republican	Waldo Rose (Write-in)	20,877	100.00%
Total votes		20,877	100.00%

== General election ==
=== Candidates ===
- Thomas E. Ferguson, incumbent Ohio State Auditor (1975–1995) (Democratic)
- Waldo Rose, Ohio State House Representative (1973–1986) (Republican)

=== Results ===
1986 Ohio State Auditor election results
Party	Candidate	Votes	%	±%
Democratic	Thomas E. Ferguson	2,005,306	66.46%	+14.26
Republican	Waldo Rose	1,012,037	33.54%	−14.26
Total votes		3,017,343	100.00%	
Democratic hold				
