= Steve Dyer =

American politician (born 1972)

Member of the Ohio House of Representatives from the 43rd district
- In office January 2, 2007 – December 31, 2010
- Preceded by: Mary Taylor
- Succeeded by: Todd McKenney

Personal details
- Born: May 4, 1972 (age 54) Akron, Ohio
- Party: Democratic
- Education: Tufts University, Kent State University, University of Akron
- Profession: Attorney, Reporter

Steve Dyer (born May 4, 1972) is a former Democratic member of the Ohio House of Representatives, who represented the 43rd District from 2007 to 2010.

== Life and career ==
A former reporter for the Akron Beacon Journal, Dyer graduated with a law degree from the University of Akron. He received his bachelor's degree from Tufts University.

== Ohio House of Representatives ==
When incumbent Mary Taylor ran for Ohio Auditor, Dyer sought to replace her. Facing another political newcomer in Republican Christina Croce, Dyer won, taking the Forty Third District. He was sworn into his first term on January 2, 2007.

Dyer advocated in the issues he valued, notably education. Along with Governor of Ohio Ted Strickland, Dyer created the evidence based model, which was a school funding system that evaluated each state school district and appropriated a funding stream. Before this, Ohio school funding had been marked as unconstitutional. He also became an advocate for homeowner protections.

In 2008, Dyer faced Republican Judy Jones. In an overwhelmingly Democratic year, Dyer won a second term and the Ohio House of Representatives was won by Democrats. In his second term, Dyer was named Chairman of the House Finance Committee's Subcommittee on Primary and Secondary Education.

With 2010, Dyer ran for a third term, and Todd McKenney, a councilman from New Franklin, Ohio, was his Republican opponent. In an overwhelmingly Republican year, the race proved to be contentious. McKenney defeated Dyer. Following his defeat, Dyer became an analyst for the liberal think tank Innovation Ohio.

Dyer filed petitions with the Summit County Board of Elections on February 2, 2011 to run for a judgeship in the Barberton Municipal Court District. The only Republican to file was Barberton Municipal Court Clerk Christine Croce.

Dyer successfully ran for an at large seat on Green City Council in 2015. He began his service in January 2016.
