= Joseph Trimble =

Joseph Trimble can refer to:

- Joseph Rothrock (Joseph Trimble Rothrock, 1839–1922), American environmentalist
- Joseph T. Tracy (Joseph Trimble Tracy, 1865–1952, American politician from Ohio
- Joe Trimble (1930–2011), American baseball player
