= Dent, Ohio =

- Census-designated place
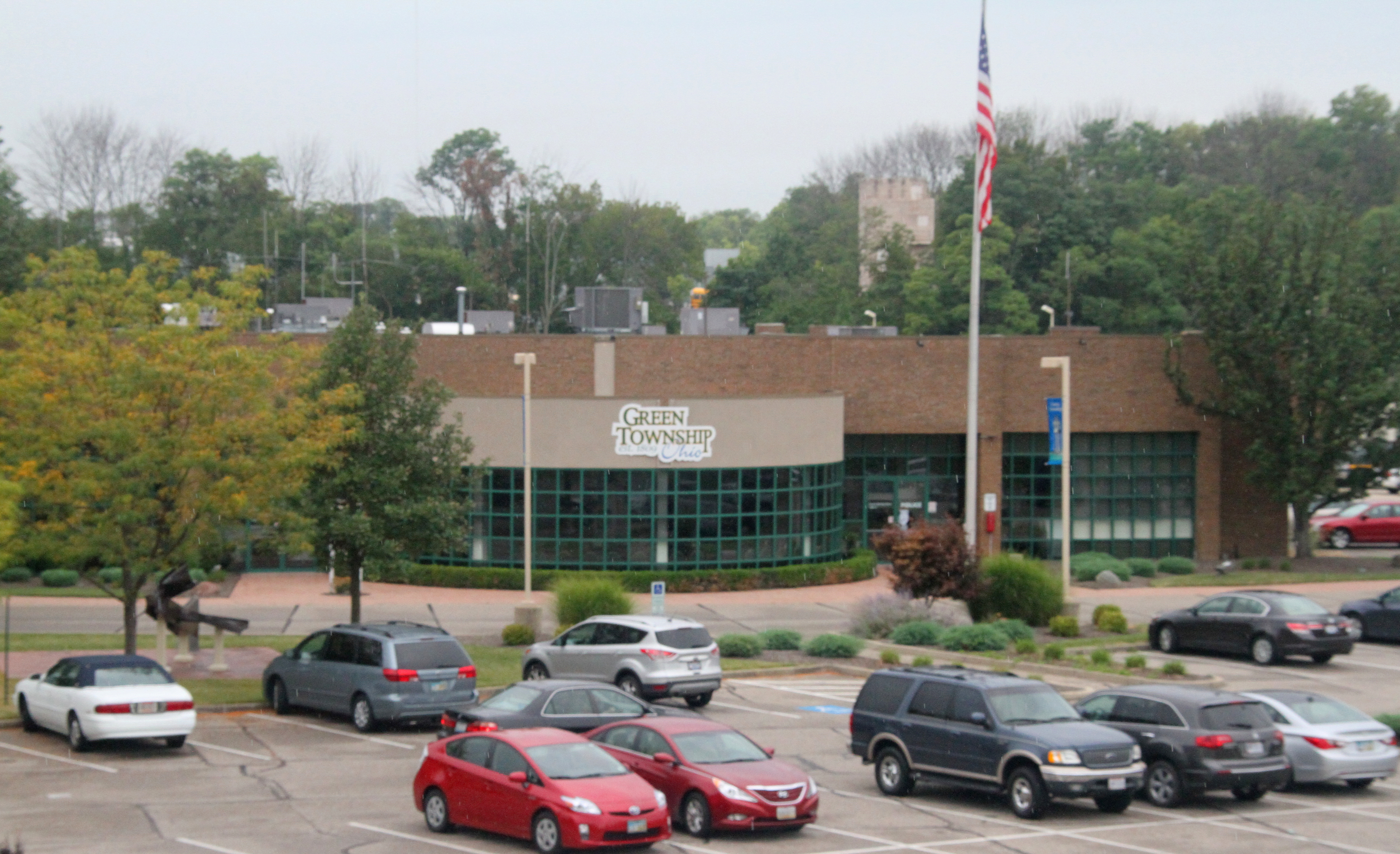
- Green Township Administrative Offices in Dent, Ohio

- Location in Hamilton County and the state of Ohio.
- Coordinates: 39°11′29″N 84°39′36″W
- Country: United States
- State: Ohio
- County: Hamilton

Area
  - Total: 6.25 sq mi (16.20 km^{2})
  - Land: 6.25 sq mi (16.20 km^{2})
  - Water: 0 sq mi (0.00 km^{2})
- Elevation: 722 ft (220 m)

Population (2020)
  - Total: 12,301
  - Density: 1,967.0/sq mi (759.45/km^{2})
- Time zone: UTC-5 (Eastern (EST))
  - Summer (DST): UTC-4 (EDT)
- ZIP codes: 45247-45248
- Area code: 513
- FIPS code: 39-21742
- GNIS feature ID: 2393394

Dent is a census-designated place (CDP) in Green Township, Hamilton County, Ohio, United States. The population was 12,301 at the 2020 census.

== History ==
Dent was originally known as Challensville in the 19th century, named for the local minister Rev. James Challenge. A post office called Challensville was established in 1843, the name was changed to Dent in 1846 at the urging of local resident and then-state representative Charles Reemelin. Reemelin was said to have disliked naming places after people and instead thought that "Dent" represented the geography of the area, with the depression of the land just east of Harrison Pike. The Dent post office closed in 1904. The present name "Dent" is after its setting in a valley (or dent).

Veterans Park was constructed in the 1990s on the former site of the Dent Drive-In. The 25-acre (10 ha) park contains a walking trail.

== Geography ==
According to the United States Census Bureau, the CDP has a total area of 5.9 square miles (15.4 km^{2}), all land.

== Demographics ==
Historical population
Census	Pop.	Note	%±
2020	12,301		—
U.S. Decennial Census

=== 2020 census ===
As of the 2020 census, Dent had a population of 12,301. The population density was 1,966.90 people per square mile (759.45/km^{2}). The median age was 41.9 years. 21.8% of residents were under the age of 18 and 19.9% of residents were 65 years of age or older. For every 100 females, there were 91.7 males, and for every 100 females age 18 and over there were 88.3 males.

100.0% of residents lived in urban areas, while 0.0% lived in rural areas.

There were 5,174 households in Dent, of which 27.2% had children under the age of 18 living in them. Of all households, 50.6% were married-couple households, 14.9% were households with a male householder and no spouse or partner present, and 28.2% were households with a female householder and no spouse or partner present. About 30.5% of all households were made up of individuals and 13.8% had someone living alone who was 65 years of age or older. The average household size was 2.44, and the average family size was 2.97.

There were 5,313 housing units, of which 2.6% were vacant. The homeowner vacancy rate was 0.7% and the rental vacancy rate was 1.8%.

Racial composition as of the 2020 census
Race	Number	Percent
White	11,178	90.9%
Black or African American	412	3.3%
American Indian and Alaska Native	16	0.1%
Asian	189	1.5%
Native Hawaiian and Other Pacific Islander	5	0.0%
Some other race	67	0.5%
Two or more races	434	3.5%
Hispanic or Latino (of any race)	191	1.6%

=== Income and poverty ===
According to the U.S. Census American Community Survey, for the period 2016-2020 the estimated median annual income for a household in the CDP was $80,585, and the median income for a family was $102,331. About 7.6% of the population were living below the poverty line, including 11.8% of those under age 18 and 4.6% of those age 65 or over. About 61.6% of the population were employed, and 40.8% had a bachelor's degree or higher.

=== 2000 census ===
As of the census of 2000, there were 7,612 people, 3,190 households, and 2,130 families residing in the CDP. The population density was 1,267.4 inhabitants per square mile (489.3/km^{2}). There were 3,369 housing units at an average density of 560.9 per square mile (216.6/km^{2}). The racial makeup of the CDP was 98.03% White, 0.68% African American, 0.22% Native American, 0.32% Asian, 0.03% Pacific Islander, 0.16% from other races, and 0.56% from two or more races. Hispanic or Latino of any race were 0.42% of the population.

There were 3,190 households, out of which 28.0% had children under the age of 18 living with them, 54.8% were married couples living together, 8.1% had a female householder with no husband present, and 33.2% were non-families. 28.1% of all households were made up of individuals, and 10.3% had someone living alone who was 65 years of age or older. The average household size was 2.39 and the average family size was 2.95.

In the CDP, the population was spread out, with 22.7% under the age of 18, 9.0% from 18 to 24, 27.6% from 25 to 44, 25.2% from 45 to 64, and 15.5% who were 65 years of age or older. The median age was 39 years. For every 100 females, there were 94.1 males. For every 100 females age 18 and over, there were 91.2 males.

The median income for a household in the CDP was $49,048, and the median income for a family was $59,888. Males had a median income of $41,406 versus $31,460 for females. The per capita income for the CDP was $24,403. About 1.6% of families and 3.7% of the population were below the poverty line, including 5.2% of those under age 18 and 2.5% of those age 65 or over.
