= 1950 United States Senate election in Ohio =

- November 7, 1950
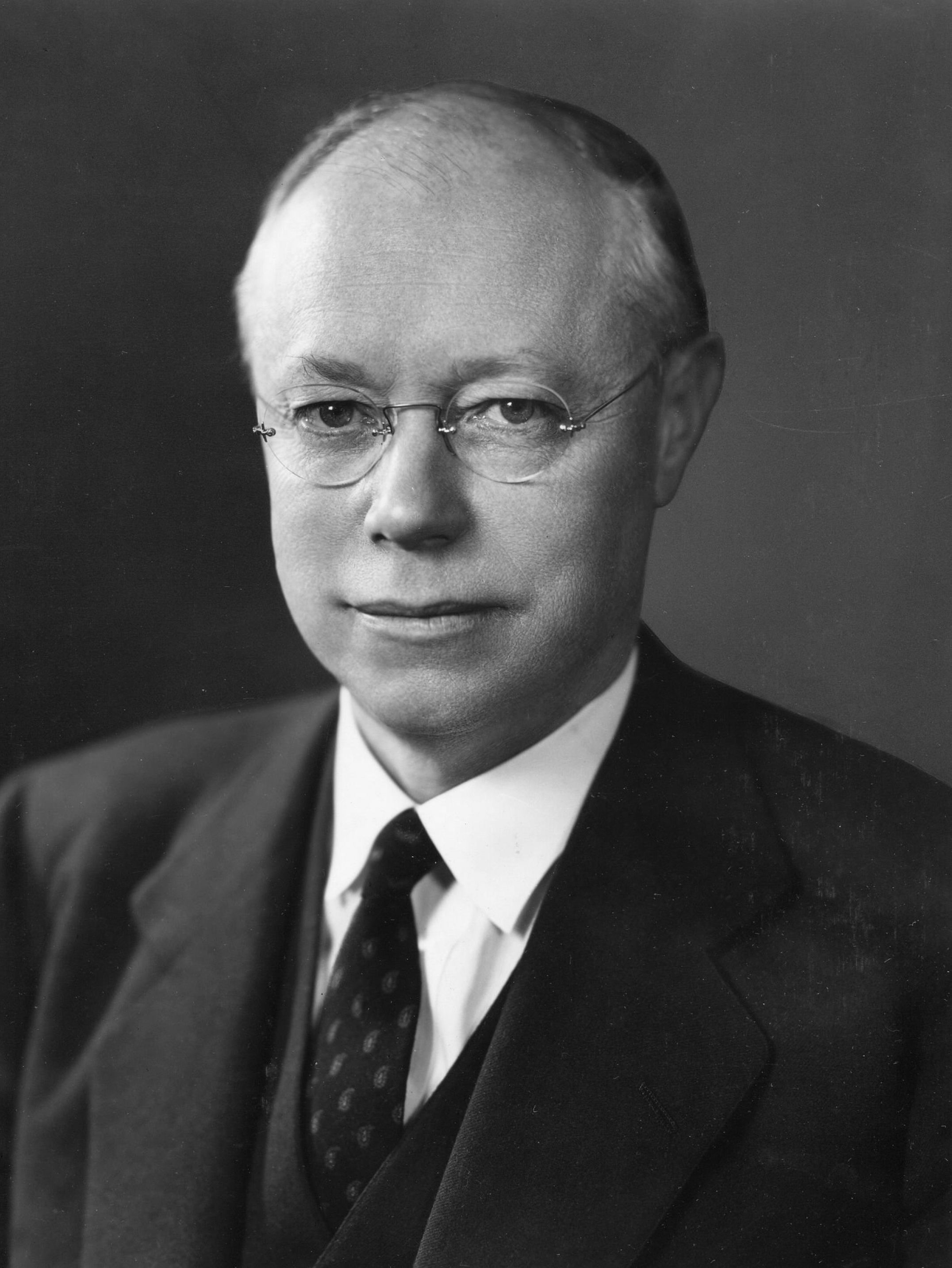

Nominee	Robert A. Taft	Joe Ferguson
Party	Republican	Democratic
Popular vote	1,645,643	1,214,459
Percentage	57.54%	42.46%
- County results Taft: 50–60% 60–70% 70–80% Ferguson: 50–60% 60–70%
U.S. senator before election
Robert A. Taft
Republican
Elected U.S. Senator
Robert A. Taft
Republican

The 1950 United States Senate election in Ohio took place on November 7, 1950. Incumbent Senator Robert A. Taft was elected to a third term in office, defeating Democratic State Auditor and 1944 presidential candidate Joseph T. Ferguson.

== Background ==
Senator Taft unsuccessfully sought the Republican presidential nomination in 1940 and 1948 and was a national leader of the party's conservative wing.

== Democratic primary ==
=== Candidates ===
- Henry M. Busch
- Michael DiSalle, Mayor of Toledo
- Joseph T. Ferguson, Ohio Auditor
- John Martin
- Walter A. Kelley
- Edward Welsh
- William L. White

=== Results ===
1950 Democratic Senate primary
Party	Candidate	Votes	%
Democratic	Joseph T. Ferguson	159,191	39.38%
Democratic	Michael DiSalle	105,601	26.12%
Democratic	Henry M. Busch	53,048	13.12%
Democratic	William L. White	27,863	6.89%
Democratic	Walter A. Kelley	22,814	5.64%
Democratic	John Martin	22,802	5.64%
Democratic	Edward Welsh	12,960	3.21%
Total votes		404,279	100.00%

== General election ==
1950 United States Senate election in Ohio
Party	Candidate	Votes	%	±%
Republican	Robert A. Taft (incumbent)	1,645,643	57.54%	▲7.44
Democratic	Joseph T. Ferguson	1,214,459	42.46%	▼7.44
Total votes		2,860,102	100.0%	

== See also ==
- 1950 United States Senate elections
