= 2002 Ohio State Auditor election =

- November 5, 2002

Nominee	Betty Montgomery	Helen Knipe Smith
Party	Republican	Democratic
Popular vote	2,010,022	1,114,957
Percentage	64.32%	35.68%
- County results Montgomery: 50–60% 60–70% 70–80% Smith: 50–60%
State Auditor before election
Jim Petro
Republican
Elected State Auditor
Betty Montgomery
Republican

The 2002 Ohio State Auditor election was held on November 5, 2002. Republican incumbent Jim Petro was term-limited and could not run for a third consecutive term. RepublicanAttorney General Betty Montgomery won the election in a landslide, defeating Democratic former Cleveland City Council member Helen Knipe Smith with 64.32% of the vote.

== Republican primary ==
The Republican primary was held on May 7, 2002. Montgomery won the Republican nomination unopposed.

=== Candidates ===
- Betty Montgomery, Ohio Attorney General (1995–2003)

=== Results ===
Republican primary results
Party	Candidate	Votes	%
Republican	Betty Montgomery	536,873	100.00%
Total votes		536,873	100.00%

== Democratic primary ==
The Democratic primary was held on May 7, 2002. Smith won the Democratic nomination without opposition.

=== Candidates ===
- Helen Knipe Smith, former Cleveland City Council Member

=== Results ===
Democratic primary results
Party	Candidate	Votes	%
Democratic	Helen Knipe Smith	403,934	100.00%
Total votes		403,934	100.00%

== General election ==
=== Endorsements ===
Betty Montgomery

Newspapers

- The Vindicator

=== Results ===
2002 State Treasurer election results
Party	Candidate	Votes	%	±%
Republican	Betty Montgomery	2,010,022	64.32%	+1.93%
Democratic	Helen Knipe Smith	1,114,957	35.68%	−1.93%
Total votes		3,124,979	100.00%	
Republican hold		Swing		
