= 1982 Ohio State Auditor election =

- November 2, 1982

Nominee	Thomas E. Ferguson	Vincent C. Campanella
Party	Democratic	Republican
Popular vote	1,692,670	1,550,227
Percentage	52.20%	47.80%
- County results Ferguson: 50–60% 60–70% Campanella: 50–60% 60–70%
State Auditor before election
Thomas E. Ferguson
Democratic
Elected State Auditor
Thomas E. Ferguson
Democratic

The 1982 Ohio State Auditor election was held on November 2, 1982, to elect the Ohio State Auditor. Primaries were held on June 8, 1982. Democratic incumbent Ohio State Auditor Thomas E. Ferguson won re-election to a third term, defeating Republican Cuyahoga County Commissioner Vincent C. Campanella by four percentage points.

== Democratic primary ==
=== Candidates ===
- Thomas E. Ferguson, incumbent Ohio State Auditor (1975–1995)
- Dennis E. Thompson (Write-in)

=== Campaign ===
Ferguson faced only token opposition, easily defeating write-in candidate Dennis E. Thompson to win renomination.

=== Results ===
Democratic primary results
Party	Candidate	Votes	%
Democratic	Thomas E. Ferguson	691,399	99.94%
Democratic	Dennis E. Thompson (Write-in)	382	0.06%
Total votes		691,781	100.00%

== Republican primary ==
=== Candidates ===
- Vincent C. Campanella, Cuyahoga County Commissioner (1981–1985)

=== Campaign ===
Campanella won the Republican nomination unopposed.

=== Results ===
Republican primary results
Party	Candidate	Votes	%
Republican	Vincent C. Campanella	501,954	100.00%
Total votes		501,954	100.00%

== General election ==
=== Candidates ===
- Thomas E. Ferguson, incumbent Ohio State Auditor (1975–1995) (Democratic)
- Vincent C. Campanella, Cuyahoga County Commissioner (1981–1985) (Republican)

=== Results ===
1982 Ohio State Auditor election results
Party	Candidate	Votes	%	±%
Democratic	Thomas E. Ferguson	1,692,670	52.20%	−3.08
Republican	Vincent C. Campanella	1,550,227	47.80%	+3.08
Total votes		3,242,897	100.00%	
Democratic hold				
