= 1990 Ohio State Auditor election =

- November 6, 1990

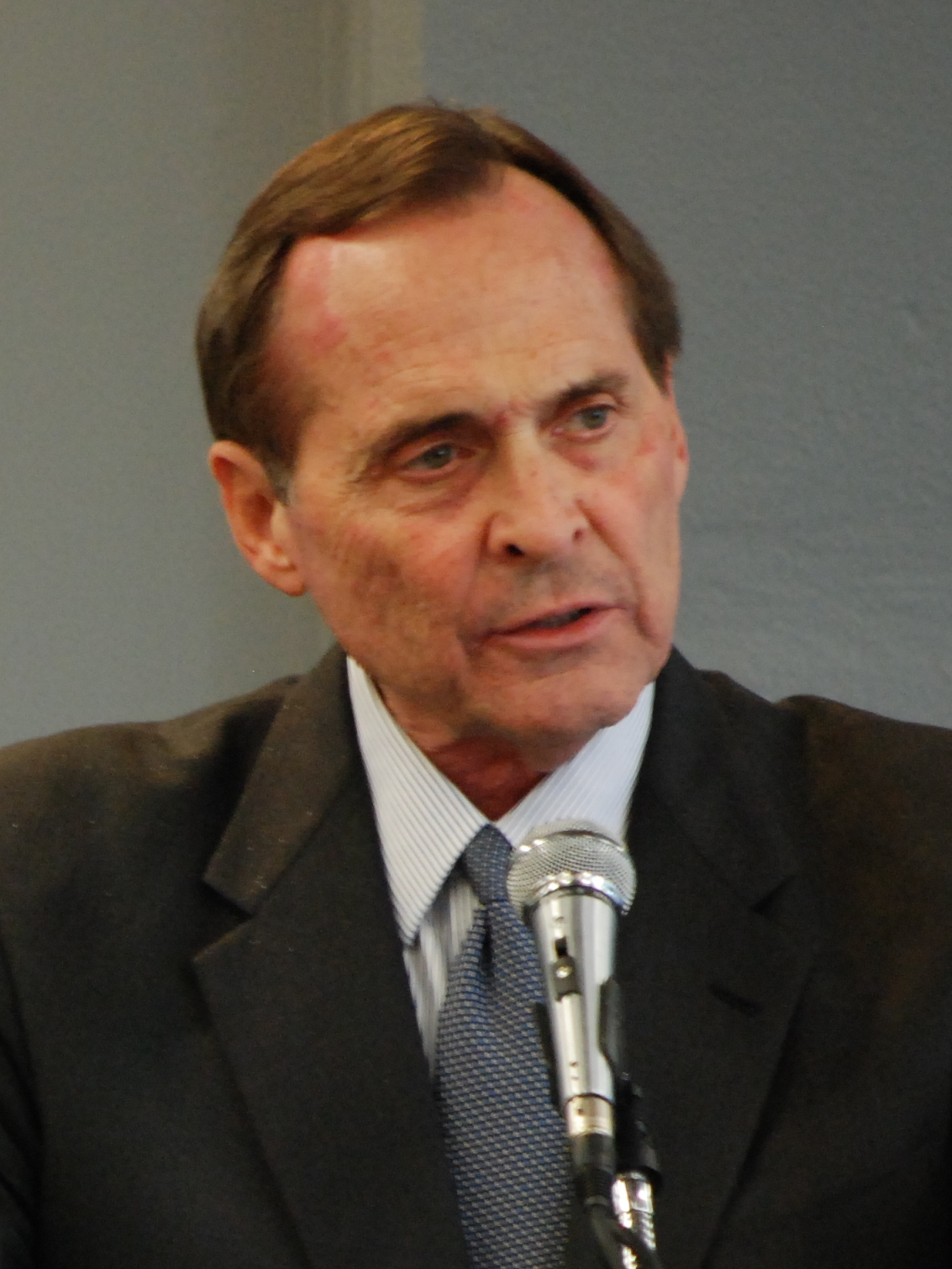
| Nominee | Thomas E. Ferguson | Jim Petro |
| Party | Democratic | Republican |
| Popular vote | 1,768,343 | 1,580,497 |
| Percentage | 52.80% | 47.20% |
- County results Ferguson: 50–60% 60–70% 70–80% Petro: 50–60% 60–70%
State Auditor before election
Thomas E. Ferguson
Democratic
Elected State Auditor
Thomas E. Ferguson
Democratic

The 1990 Ohio State Auditor election was held on November 6, 1990, to elect the Ohio State Auditor. Primaries were held on May 8, 1990. Democratic incumbent Ohio State Auditor Thomas E. Ferguson won re-election to a fifth term in office, defeating Republican Ohio State House Representative Jim Petro by five percentage points.

As of 2026, this is the last time Democrats have won the office of Ohio State Auditor.

== Democratic primary ==
=== Candidates ===
- Thomas E. Ferguson, incumbent Ohio State Auditor (1975–1995)

=== Campaign ===
Ferguson won renomination unopposed.

=== Results ===
Democratic primary results
| Party | Candidate | Votes | % |
|---|---|---|---|
| Democratic | Thomas E. Ferguson | 736,746 | 100.00% |
| Total votes | | 736,746 | 100.00% |

== Republican primary ==
=== Candidates ===
- Jim Petro, Ohio State House Representative (1987–1990) (1981–1984)

=== Campaign ===
Petro won the Republican nomination without opposition.

=== Results ===
Republican primary results
| Party | Candidate | Votes | % |
|---|---|---|---|
| Republican | Jim Petro | 507,434 | 100.00% |
| Total votes | | 507,434 | 100.00% |

== General election ==
=== Candidates ===
- Thomas E. Ferguson, incumbent Ohio State Auditor (1975–1995) (Democratic)
- Jim Petro, Ohio State House Representative (1987–1990) (1981–1984) (Republican)

=== Results ===
1990 Ohio State Auditor election results
| Party | Candidate | Votes | % | ±% |
|---|---|---|---|---|
| Democratic | Thomas E. Ferguson | 1,768,343 | 52.80% | −13.66 |
| Republican | Jim Petro | 1,580,497 | 47.20% | +13.66 |
| Total votes | | 3,348,840 | 100.00% | |
| Democratic hold | | | | |
