= Thomas Gibson (American politician) =

1st Ohio State Auditor
- In office March 15, 1803 – March 1, 1808
- Preceded by: himself (as Auditor of Northwest Territory)
- Succeeded by: Benjamin Hough

Personal details
- Born: 1750 Virginia
- Died: May 3, 1814 (aged 63–64) Ohio
- Party: Democratic-Republican

Thomas Gibson (1750 – May 13, 1814) was an American Revolutionary War soldier who became the first Auditor of the U.S. State of Ohio.

Gibson was born in Virginia, and fought in the American Revolutionary War. He moved to the Northwest Territory, where he was auditor of the Territory.

Ohio became a state in March, 1803. The Ohio General Assembly met in joint session, and elected Gibson as the first Ohio State Auditor on March 15, 1803. He served a three-year term, and was re-elected by the legislature on January 20, 1806. Gibson served until resigning March 1, 1808.

Gibson was a Freemason. He was an early member of the Nova Caesaree Lodge No. 10, Cincinnati, Ohio, and the first master of the Scioto Lodge No. 2, Chillicothe, Ohio, from 1805 to 1807. He was exalted in Cincinnati Chapter No. 2, R.A.M., December 11, 1799. He died May 3, 1814.

== Notes ==
Political offices
Preceded by new office	Auditor of Ohio; 1803–1808	Succeeded by Benjamin Hough
