= Anthony DeVitis =

American politician

Member of the Ohio House of Representatives from the 36th district
- In office December 8, 2011 – January 1, 2021
- Preceded by: Todd McKenney
- Succeeded by: Bob Young

Personal details
- Born: July 14, 1965 (age 61) Akron, Ohio, U.S.
- Party: Republican
- Education: University of Akron
- Occupation: Small Business Owner, Legislator
- Website: www.ohiohouse.gov/anthony-devitis

Anthony DeVitis (born July 14, 1965) is a politician who was in the Ohio House of Representatives, representing the 36th District from his election in November 2012 until January 1, 2021. He was appointed to represent the 43rd District in December 2011, but he was placed in the 36th District after redistricting.

== FirstEnergy scandal ==
In 2019, Rep. Anthony DeVitis was among the lawmakers who supported House Bill 6 (HB 6), the energy legislation later tied to what prosecutors described as the largest corruption case in Ohio history. The $60 million bribery and racketeering scheme centered on former House Speaker Larry Householder and funds provided by FirstEnergy Corporation. See Ohio nuclear bribery scandal.

According to campaign finance records, DeVitis received $20,415 from the FirstEnergy political action committee in 2018, $7,500 in early 2019, and $1,000 later in 2019, during the period surrounding the passage of HB 6.

HB 6 authorized a $1.3 billion ratepayer-funded bailout for two nuclear plants formerly owned by a FirstEnergy subsidiary.

DeVitis was not charged in the bribery case, but his campaign contributions and support for HB 6 drew scrutiny from watchdog groups who have called for greater transparency around utility money in Ohio politics.

== Life and career ==
Prior to serving in the House, DeVitis was a council member in Green, Ohio. He is currently the co-owner of a real estate partnership, an Italian food distribution company, and an Italian retail store.

DeVitis is married and has two children, including current Green city council member Clark Anthony DeVitis.

== Ohio House of Representatives ==
DeVitis was appointed in December 2011 to fill the vacancy caused by the resignation of Todd McKenney, who was appointed as Summit County Probate Court judge.

He is currently the state representative for Ohio's 36th District serving Summit County. He is on the Insurance, Commerce, Labor, and Technology, and Transportation, Public Safety, and Homeland Security committees.

In 2012, DeVitis was elected to a full term over Democrat Paul Colavecchio with 52.66% of the vote.

In 2014, Devitis won reelection against Summit County Councilwoman Paula Prentice with 59.7% of the vote

In 2015, DeVitis cosponsored the Fetal Heartbeat bill. The bill would ban all abortion in Ohio after 6 weeks, even in cases of rape or incest.
