= Oviatt Cole =

Ohio State Auditor from 1863 to 1864

Oviatt Cole was an American politician in Ohio. A Republican, he was Ohio State Auditor 1863–1864.

When Ohio State Auditor Robert Walker Tayler, Sr. resigned in 1863 to take another position, Oviatt Cole of Medina County, Ohio was appointed by Governor Tod to fill the office.

At the Republican State Convention later in 1863, Cole lost on the first ballot to James H. Godman for the nomination for Auditor.

While living in Litchfield, Ohio, Cole was Recorder of Medina County, Ohio from 1836–1842.

== Notes ==
Political offices
| Preceded by Robert W. Tayler | Ohio State Auditor; 1863–1864 | Succeeded by James H. Godman |
