= Ralph Osborn =

American politician

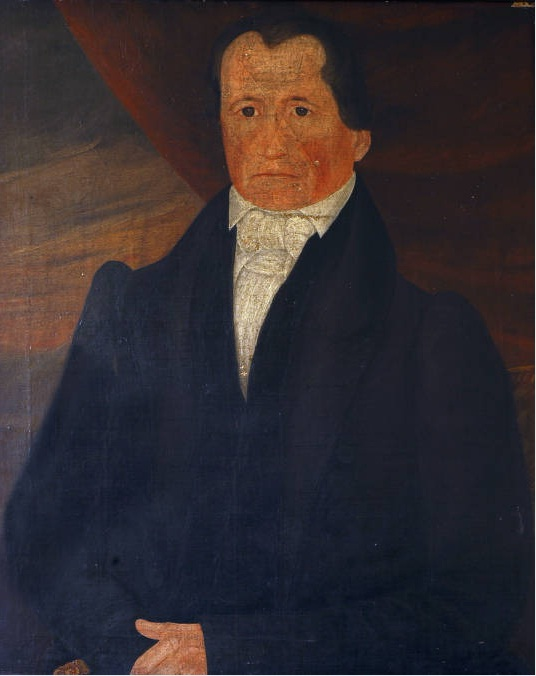
circa 1815

Ralph Osborn (1780 – December 27, 1835) was the state auditor of Ohio who served as defendant in the Supreme Court case Osborn v. Bank of the United States.

Ralph Osborn was born in Waterbury, Connecticut, in 1780. After completing his legal education, he moved to Franklin, Ohio, in 1806, where he practiced law. After two or three years, he accepted appointment as the first prosecuting attorney of Delaware County, Ohio. He was later elected Clerk of the House in the Ohio legislature, where he served five consecutive sessions, until he was chosen Auditor of the state in 1815, where he served eighteen consecutive years. In 1833, he was chosen to represent the counties of Franklin and Pickaway in the Ohio State Senate. After this, he moved to Columbus, Ohio, where he died in December, 1833, at age 56.

Political offices
Preceded by Benjamin Hough	Ohio Auditor of State; 1815–1833	Succeeded by John A. Bryan
Ohio Senate
Preceded by William Doherty	Senator from Franklin and Pickaway Counties; 1833–1835	Succeeded by Elias Florence
