= John F. Oglevee =

American lawyer

John Finley Oglevee

13th Ohio State Auditor
- In office January 12, 1880 – January 14, 1884
- Governor: Charles Foster
- Preceded by: James Williams
- Succeeded by: Emil Kiesewetter

Member of the Ohio House of Representatives from the Clark County district
- In office January 3, 1876 – January 4, 1880
- Preceded by: Benjamin Neff
- Succeeded by: E. G. Dial; N. M. McConkey

Personal details
- Born: May 17, 1840 Cadiz, Ohio
- Died: April 25, 1903 (aged 62) Columbus, Ohio
- Resting place: Green Lawn Cemetery
- Party: Republican
- Education: Franklin College; University of Michigan Law School

Military service
- Allegiance: United States
- Branch/service: (United States) Union Army
- Years of service: August 6, 1862 - June 3, 1865
- Rank: 1st Lieutenant
- Unit: 98th Ohio Infantry

John Finley Oglevee (May 17, 1840 - April 25, 1903) was a Republican politician in the U.S. State of Ohio who was a member of the Ohio House of Representatives for four years and Ohio State Auditor for four years. He was also a Union Army soldier in the American Civil War.

John F. Oglevee was born in Harrison County, Ohio near Cadiz. He lived on a farm, and attended public schools and Franklin College in New Athens, Ohio. On August 6, 1862, he enlisted in Company C of the 98th Ohio Infantry. At the Battle of Chickamauga, he was severely wounded and promoted to second lieutenant for gallantry. He was promoted to first lieutenant September 26, 1864. During the Atlanta campaign he commanded his company, and was promoted to adjutant of the regiment. He mustered out May 1865.

He moved to Springfield, Ohio, in 1866 and studied law. He enrolled in the University of Michigan Law School in October 1866, and was admitted to the bar in December 1867. In October 1871, he was elected Auditor of Clark County, Ohio, and re-elected in 1873. In 1875 and again in 1877, he was elected to represent the county in the Ohio House of Representatives for the 62nd and 63rd General Assemblies, (1876–1879).

In 1879, he was nominated by the Republicans for Ohio State Auditor, and defeated Democrat Charles Reemelin in the autumn for a four-year term. He was again nominated in 1883, but lost to Democrat Emil Kiesewetter. He then engaged in private business in Columbus.

Oglevee died April 25, 1903, and is interred in Green Lawn Cemetery, Columbus, Ohio.

== Notes ==
Political offices
Preceded by James Williams	Ohio State Auditor; 1880–1884	Succeeded by Emil Kiesewetter
Ohio House of Representatives
Preceded by Benjamin Neff	Representative from Clark County; 1876-1879	Succeeded by E. G. Dial; N.M. McConkey
