= Ebenezer W. Poe =

American politician

Ebenezer Wilson Poe
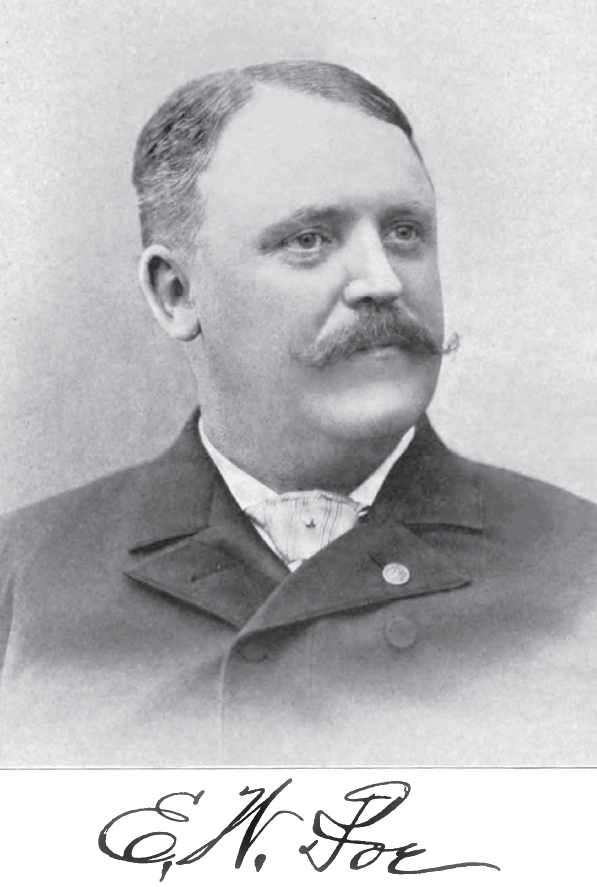

15th Ohio State Auditor
- In office January 9, 1888 – January 13, 1896
- Preceded by: Emil Kiesewetter
- Succeeded by: Walter D. Guilbert

Personal details
- Born: November 11, 1846 Findlay, Ohio
- Died: June 19, 1898 (aged 51) Columbus, Ohio
- Resting place: Green Lawn Cemetery
- Party: Republican
- Spouse: Caroline Thomas
- Children: four

Ebenezer Wilson Poe (November 11, 1846 – June 19, 1898) was a Republican politician in the U.S. State of Ohio who was Ohio State Auditor 1888–1896.

== Early life ==
Ebenezer W. Poe was born at Hancock County, Ohio, on a farm near Findlay. After his father enlisted in the Union Army in 1862 during the American Civil War, he enlisted at age 16 in Company G of the One Hundred Thirty-Third Ohio Volunteer Infantry, and served in the Army of the Cumberland until mustered out in August, 1864.

== Mid life ==
Poe then re-enrolled in the high school in Findlay and graduated. He taught school for three years, was a store clerk, and in 1873 ran a store. He disposed of that business in 1875, and was a traveling salesman for six years. In 1881, the Republicans nominated him for Wood County Auditor, he won, and was re-elected in 1883.

== State office ==
At the 1887 Republican State Convention, Poe won on the first ballot in a field of seven for the nomination for Ohio State Auditor. He defeated incumbent Democrat Emil Kiesewetter in the general election. He won re-election in 1891.

At the 1895 Republican State Convention, Poe was among eight candidates for the Governor nomination, and, after the third ballot, threw his support to eventual nominee and Governor Asa S. Bushnell. After his term as Auditor expired, he associated with an Equitable Life Insurance.

== Personal ==
Poe was married October 8, 1868, to Caroline Thomas of McComb, Ohio, and had four children.

Poe died June 19, 1898, in Columbus, Ohio. He was a member of the Independent Order of Odd Fellows and Grand Army of the Republic, and was a Methodist. He was interred in Green Lawn Cemetery, Columbus, Ohio.

== Notes ==
Political offices
Preceded by Emil Kiesewetter	Ohio State Auditor; 1888–1896	Succeeded by Walter D. Guilbert
