= Mary Taylor (Ohio politician) =

American politician

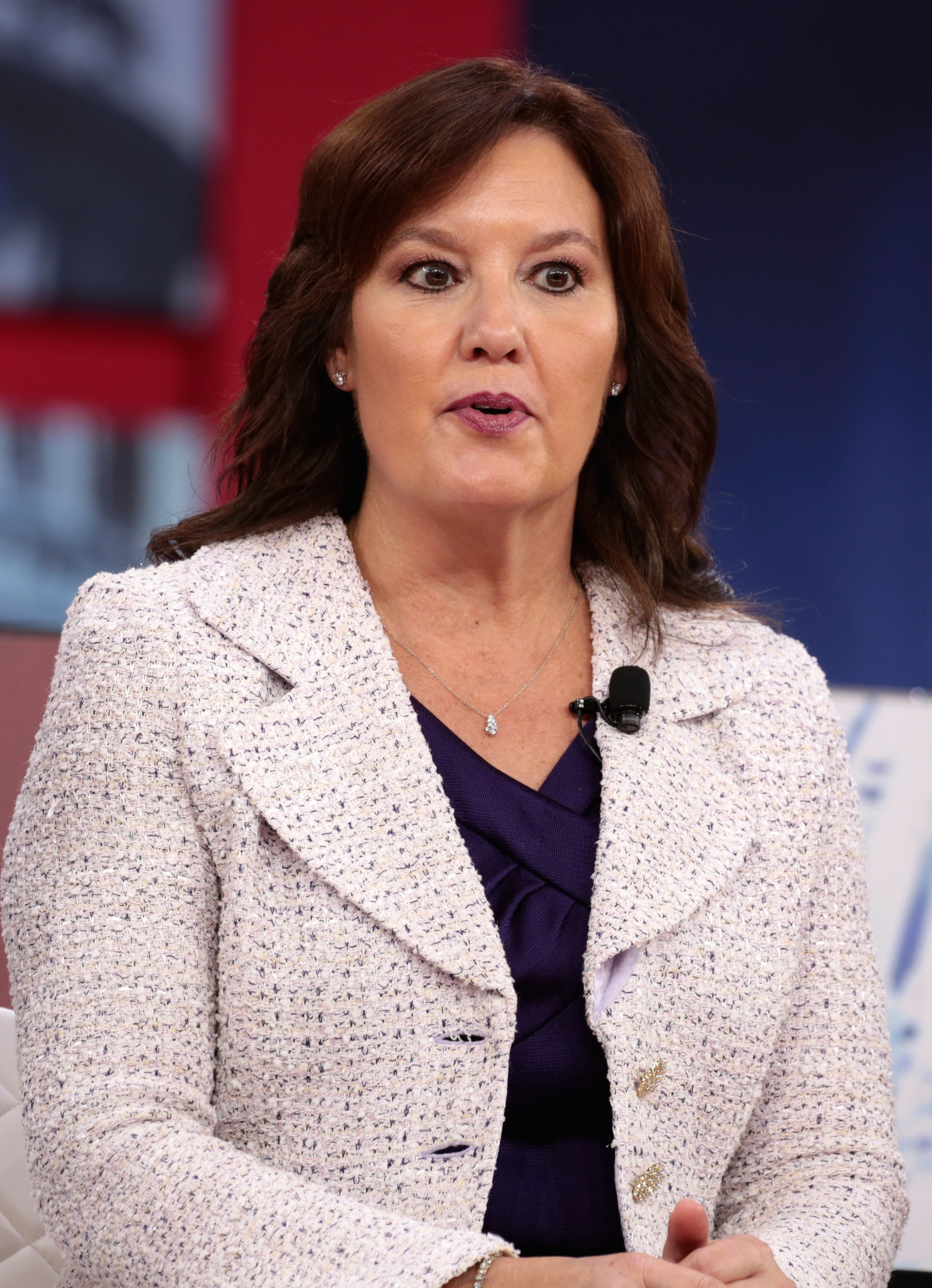
- Taylor in 2018

65th Lieutenant Governor of Ohio
- In office January 10, 2011 – January 14, 2019
- Governor: John Kasich
- Preceded by: Lee Fisher
- Succeeded by: Jon Husted

31st Auditor of Ohio
- In office January 8, 2007 – January 9, 2011
- Governor: Ted Strickland
- Preceded by: Betty Montgomery
- Succeeded by: Dave Yost

Member of the Ohio House of Representatives from the 43rd district
- In office January 3, 2003 – December 31, 2006
- Preceded by: Twyla Roman
- Succeeded by: Steve Dyer

Personal details
- Born: March 7, 1966 (age 60) Green, Ohio, U.S.
- Party: Republican
- Spouse: Don Taylor
- Children: 2
- Education: University of Akron (BS, MS)

Mary Taylor (born March 7, 1966) is an American businesswoman and politician who served as the 65th lieutenant governor of Ohio from 2011 to 2019.

She was most recently a candidate in the Republican Party primary for Governor of Ohio in the 2018 election.

== Early life and business career ==
Taylor was born in 1966. She attended Springfield Local School District in Springfield Township. She attended the University of Akron, obtaining a bachelor's degree in Accounting and master's degree in Taxation. Becoming a Certified Public Accountant, she worked for Deloitte and Touche and Bober, Markey, Fedorovich & Company in Akron.

== Political career ==
Taylor was first elected to the Green City Council, eventually being elected to the Ohio General Assembly to represent the 43rd district. In 2006, she was elected to serve as Ohio State Auditor, where she defeated Democratic candidate Barbara Sykes. Taylor succeeded fellow Republican Betty Montgomery as state auditor in January 2007. She was the only Republican in Ohio to be elected to a statewide non-judicial office during the 2006 election.

=== Lieutenant governor ===
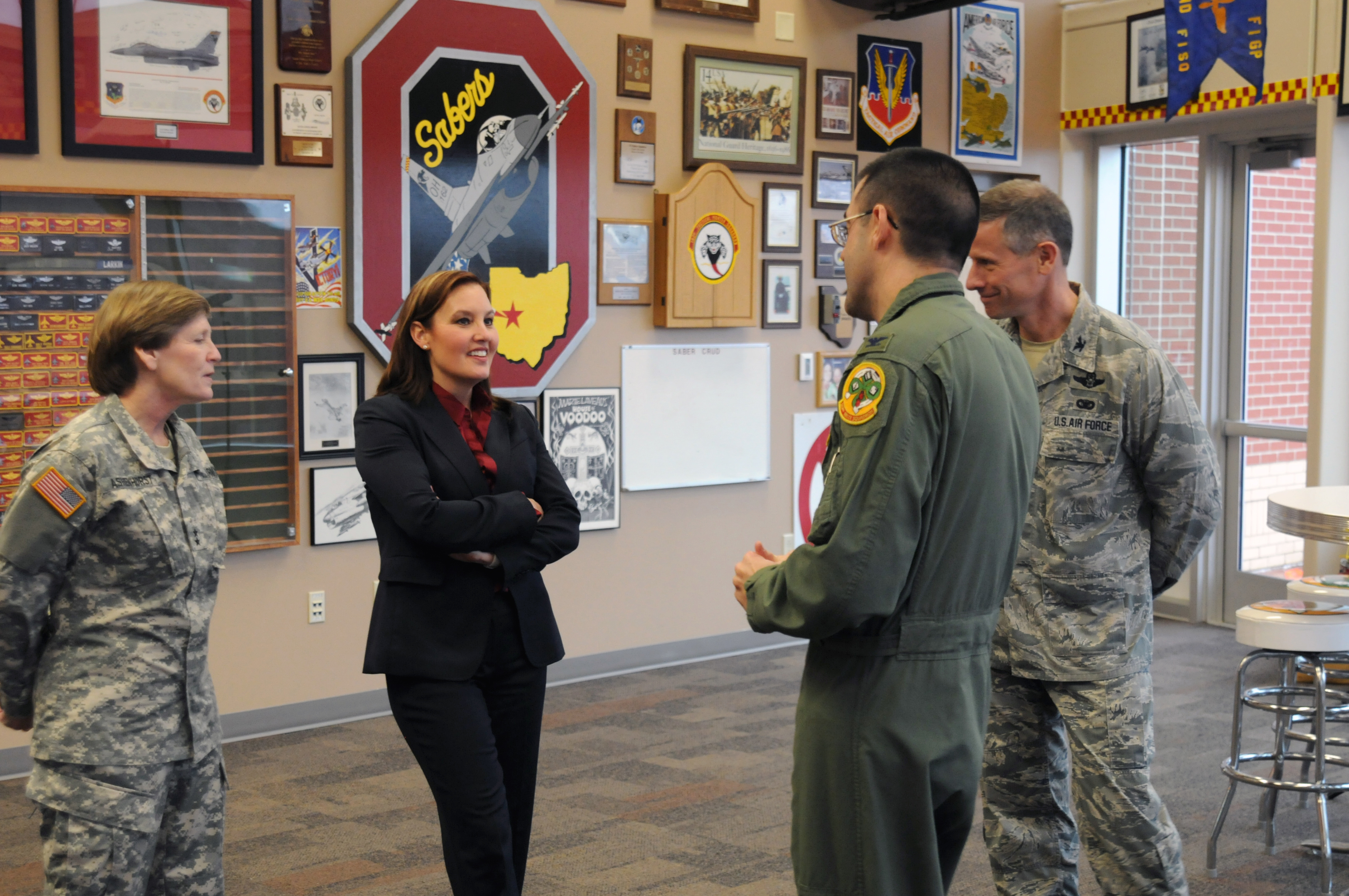
Ohio Lt. Gov. Mary Taylor visiting the 178th Fighter Wing at the Springfield Air National Guard Base, on March 19, 2014

On January 14, 2010, she was announced as John Kasich's choice as lieutenant gubernatorial running mate in the 2010 election.

On November 2, 2010, Kasich defeated incumbent Governor Ted Strickland (D). Thus Taylor became the lieutenant governor on January 10, 2011. She was named as Director of the Ohio Department of Insurance the same day.

Kasich and Taylor were re-elected in November 2014.

In 2011, it was reported that she on several occasions used the state airplane to run "personal errands." Governor Kasich stated he requested Taylor to refund the money. Taylor stated that she had already refunded the money, even though the plane was only used for official business.

An analysis by USA Today's Cincinnati branch indicated unusually high turnover among her staff during her tenure as Lieutenant Governor.

=== 2018 Ohio gubernatorial election ===
On February 23, 2017 she formed a campaign committee to raise money and campaign in the 2018 Ohio gubernatorial election. She was endorsed by U.S. Senator Ted Cruz in April 2018. Taylor's campaign hired Axiom Strategies, a consulting firm, with close ties to Cruz. On May 8, 2018, Taylor lost the Republican Primary to Ohio Attorney General Mike DeWine, garnering 40.2% of the vote compared to DeWine's 59.8% of the vote.

== Family ==
She is married to Donzell (Don) Taylor and has two sons, Joe (b. circa 1991) and Michael (b. circa 1994) and the family resides in Green. In 2017 she revealed that both her children have been struggling with opioid addiction.

== Electoral history ==
Ohio House of Representatives 43rd District Election, 2002
Party	Candidate	Votes	%
Republican	Mary Taylor	21,013	53.61
Democratic	Michael Grimm	18,180	46.39

Ohio House of Representatives 43rd District Election, 2004
Party	Candidate	Votes	%
Republican	Mary Taylor (inc.)	34,478	57.58
Democratic	Jane Tabor-Grimm	25,399	42.42

Ohio Auditor Election, 2006
Party	Candidate	Votes	%
Republican	Mary Taylor	1,940,665	50.64
Democratic	Barbara Sykes	1,891,874	49.36

== See also ==
- List of female lieutenant governors in the United States

Ohio House of Representatives
Preceded by Twyla Roman	Member of the Ohio House of Representatives from the 43rd district January 3, 2003 – December 31, 2006	Succeeded by Steve Dyer
Party political offices
Preceded by Betty Montgomery	Republican nominee for Auditor of Ohio; 2006	Succeeded by Dave Yost
Preceded by Tom Raga	Republican nominee for Lieutenant Governor of Ohio; 2010, 2014	Succeeded by Jon Husted
Political offices
Preceded by Betty Montgomery	Auditor of Ohio; January 8, 2007 – January 10, 2011	Succeeded by Dave Yost
Preceded by Lee Fisher	Lieutenant Governor of Ohio; January 10, 2011 – January 14, 2019	Succeeded by Jon Husted
