= Todd McKenney (politician) =

American politician (born 1963)

Summit County Common Pleas Judge, General Division
- In office November, 2014 – January 5, 2017
- Preceded by: Jane Davis
- Succeeded by: Alison Breaux

Barberton Municipal Court Judge
- In office April 11, 2014 – November, 2014
- Preceded by: Christine Croce
- Succeeded by: Jill Flagg Lanzinger

Summit County Common Pleas Judge, Probate Division
- In office November 18, 2011 – December 31, 2012
- Preceded by: Bill Spicer
- Succeeded by: Elinore Marsh Stormer

Member of the Ohio House of Representatives from the 43rd district
- In office January 3, 2011 – November 16, 2011
- Preceded by: Steve Dyer
- Succeeded by: Anthony DeVitis

Personal details
- Born: October 11, 1963 (age 62) Akron, Ohio
- Party: Republican
- Education: Hiram College, Ohio State University
- Profession: Lawyer

Todd McKenney (born October 11, 1963) is a Judge of the Barberton Municipal Court in Summit County. McKenney formerly served as a Judge of the Summit County Common Pleas Court, Probate and General Division. He was formerly a member of the Ohio General Assembly, serving the 43rd District from January 3, 2011 until resigning November 16, 2011 to take the Judicial Appointment from Governor John Kasich after the retirement of Judge Bill Spicer. Governor John Kasich appointed Judge Todd McKenney to fill the seat on the Barberton Municipal Court bench on April 11, 2014. In November 2014, Judge McKenney was elected to the Summit County Court of Common Pleas. Judge McKenney ran for a full term in 2016, was narrowly defeated, then in 2017 Judge McKenney returned to the Barberton Municipal Court and was elected to a full six year term.

== Career ==
After graduation from Hiram College and The Ohio State University College of Law, McKenney served as a judicial law clerk to federal Judge David D. Dowd, Jr. He also served as a pastor, attorney and on the New Franklin City Council. In 2021, Judge Todd and his wife Bethany McKenney were awarded the Albert and Iris Gilbert Humanitarian Award of the Year by the Ohio District Kiwanis for significant acts of caring and community service.

== Initiatives ==
While Summit County Probate Judge, McKenney initiated the Summit County Good Deeds Project which identified and educated thousands of Summit County residents about making survivorship deed updates to avoid probate when property is transferred upon death. For his efforts Judge McKenney received Akron Bar Association's Liberty Bell Award in 2013.

== Summit County Probate Judge ==
Todd McKenney officially took office November 18, 2011.
