= Benjamin Hough =

American politician

2nd Ohio State Auditor
- In office March 1, 1808 – March 15, 1815
- Governor: Thomas Kirker; Samuel Huntington; Return J. Meigs Jr. Othniel Looker; Thomas Worthington
- Preceded by: Thomas Gibson
- Succeeded by: Ralph Osborn

Member of the Ohio House of Representatives from the Jefferson County district
- In office December 7, 1807 – February 29, 1808 Serving with Thomas Elliott; Thomas McCune
- Preceded by: Thomas Elliott; Samuel Boyd; John McLaughlin
- Succeeded by: James Pritchard; Samuel Dunlap; Thomas McCune

Member of the Ohio Senate from the Jefferson County district
- In office December 2, 1805 – December 6, 1807 Serving with James Pritchard; John Taggart
- Preceded by: John Milligan; James Pritchard
- Succeeded by: John McLaughlin; John McConnell

Member of the Ohio Senate from the Ross County district
- In office December 4, 1815 – November 30, 1817 Serving with John McDonald; James Dunlap
- Preceded by: Henry Brush; James Dunlap; William Creighton, Sr.
- Succeeded by: James Dunlap; John McDonald

Personal details
- Born: 1773 Virginia
- Died: September 4, 1819 (aged 45–46) Chillicothe, Ohio
- Resting place: Grandview Cemetery
- Party: Democratic Republican
- Spouse: Elizabeth Core

Benjamin Hough (1773 – September 4, 1819) was the second State Auditor of the U.S. State of Ohio from 1808 to 1815. He also served in local political offices and in both houses of the Ohio General Assembly.

Hough was born in Virginia. He was in Jefferson County, Northwest Territory by 1802 when he surveyed Cross Creek Township into quarter sections. He was elected a county commissioner at the first election, April 2, 1804, after Ohio became a state.

Hough represented Jefferson County in the Ohio State Senate 1805 to 1807, and the Ohio House of Representatives 1807 to 1808. Thomas Gibson resigned as Ohio State Auditor March 1, 1808. The legislature had adjourned February 22, 1808, and would not meet again until December, so Governor Thomas Kirker appointed Hough as Auditor.

Hough was re-elected by the legislature December 18, 1809, and again February 20, 1812, serving until March 15, 1815. He remained in the capital, Chillicothe, after his term, and was elected again to the Ohio Senate, 1815 to 1816, from Ross County. He was a Democratic-Republican Party Presidential elector in 1816 for Monroe/Tompkins.

Hough was married to Elizabeth Core on August 29, 1806, by Stephen Ford, justice of the Peace, in Jefferson County. Hough died at Chillicothe, leaving his widow and children. He is buried at Grandview Cemetery.

== Notes ==
Political offices
| Preceded by Thomas Gibson | Auditor of Ohio; 1808–1815 | Succeeded by Ralph Osborn |
