= Vic Donahey =

U.S. Politician from Ohio

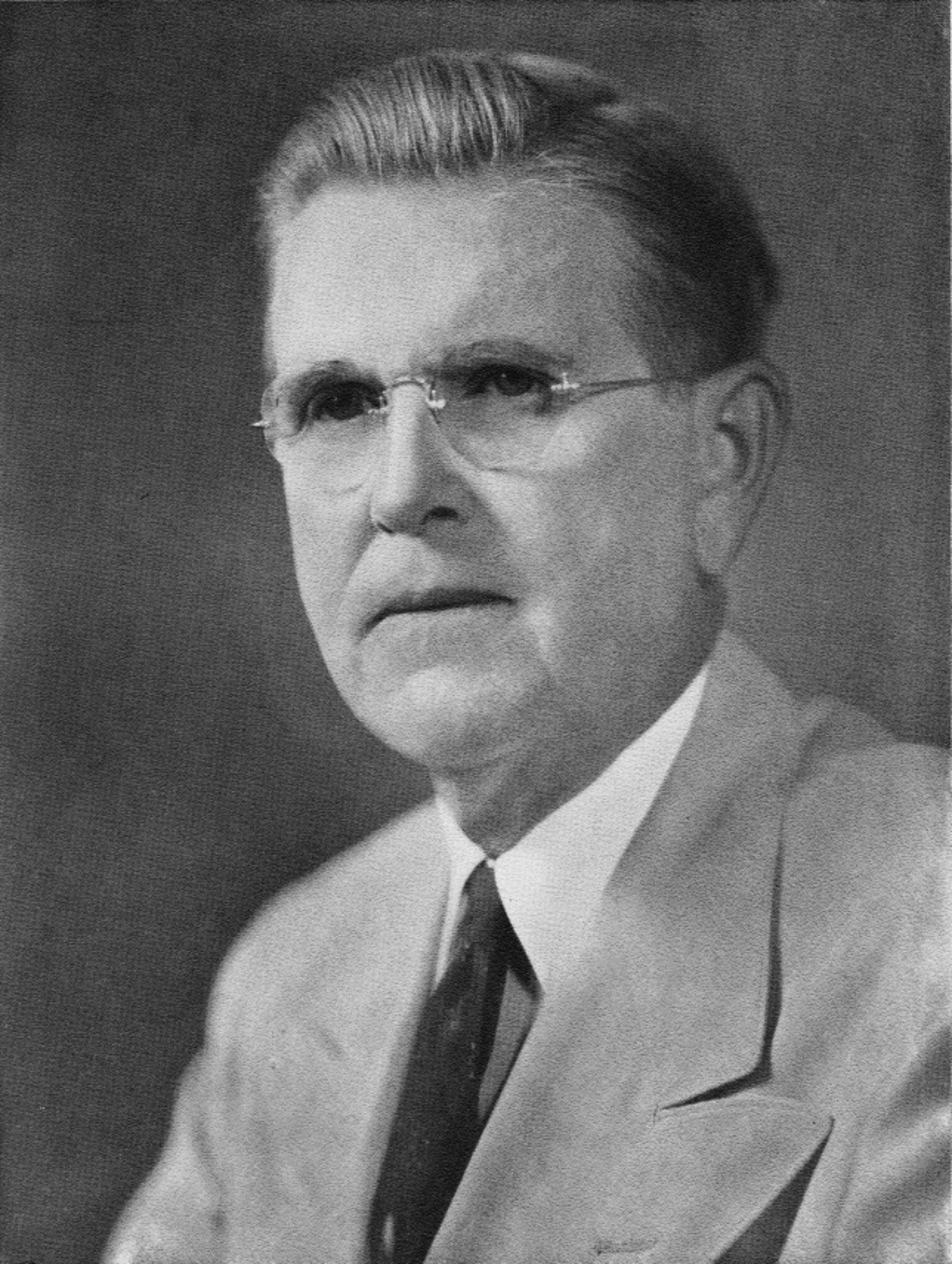
- Official portrait, c. 1938

United States Senator from Ohio
- In office January 3, 1935 – January 3, 1941
- Preceded by: Simeon D. Fess
- Succeeded by: Harold H. Burton

50th Governor of Ohio
- In office January 8, 1923 – January 14, 1929
- Lieutenant: Earl D. Bloom; Charles H. Lewis; Earl D. Bloom; William G. Pickrel; George C. Braden
- Preceded by: Harry L. Davis
- Succeeded by: Myers Y. Cooper

Ohio State Auditor
- In office 1913–1921
- Governor: James M. Cox; Frank B. Willis; James M. Cox
- Preceded by: Edward M. Fullington
- Succeeded by: Joseph T. Tracy

Personal details
- Born: Alvin Victor Donahey; July 7, 1873 Cadwallader, Ohio, U.S.
- Died: April 8, 1946 (aged 72) Columbus, Ohio, U.S.
- Resting place: East Avenue Cemetery, New Philadelphia, Ohio
- Party: Democratic
- Spouse: Mary Edith Harvey (1879–1953)
- Relations: Gertrude Walton Donahey (daughter-in-law); William Donahey (brother)
- Children: 12 (including John W. Donahey)
- Occupation: Businessman; Politician

Alvin Victor "Honest Vic" Donahey (July 7, 1873 – April 8, 1946) was an American progressive Democratic Party politician from Ohio. Donahey was the 50th governor of Ohio and a United States senator from Ohio.

Donahey left school early to become a printer; in addition to working as a newspaper editor, he owned his own printing company. After serving in local and county government as a school board member and county auditor in the early 1900s, in 1912 he won election as Ohio's state auditor, and he served until 1921. After an unsuccessful campaign for governor in 1920, in 1922 Donahey won the governorship. He was reelected in 1924 and 1926, and served from 1923 to 1929. In 1934, Donahey won election to the U.S. Senate, and he served one term, 1935 to 1941.

After leaving office, Donahey resumed his business interests, including serving as president of the Donahey Clay Products Company, which made tiles for use in home construction. He died in Columbus in 1946, and was buried at East Avenue Cemetery in New Philadelphia.

== Early life ==
Donahey was born in Cadwallader, Ohio, the son of John C. Donahey and Catherine (Chaney) Donahey. He attended the public schools of Tuscarawas County, and left high school in his junior year to receive training as a printer; he worked at the New Philadelphia Times from 1893 to 1905, and advanced from journeyman to foreman to associate editor before becoming owner of his own printing company.

== Career ==
Donahey was elected clerk of the Goshen Township Board of Trustees in 1898, and served until 1903. He served as Tuscarawas County Auditor from 1905 to 1909 while at the same time serving on New Philadelphia, Ohio's Board of Education. After serving as a delegate to the 1912 Constitutional Convention, Donahey served as state auditor from 1912 to 1921. He did not seek re-election in 1920, but unsuccessfully sought the governorship.

== Governor ==
In 1922, Donahey won the governor's race. He served three terms, 1923 to 1929, and was not a candidate for re-election in 1928. Donahey earned the nickname "Veto Vic" while governor because he vetoed seventy-six bills during his first term in office. Of particular concern to Donahey were bills for increasing state revenue; he vetoed every bill that would have raised taxes. Donahey also vetoed a Ku Klux Klan-backed bill that would have mandated daily Bible reading in public schools. In addition, he vetoed a bill promoted by the Anti-Saloon League that would have required individuals convicted of crimes, primarily those convicted of possessing or consuming alcohol, to perform manual labor if they had been assessed fines which had gone unpaid. Instead, Donahey pardoned more than two thousand convicts who were serving time in jails and workhouses, arguing that enforcement of the Prohibition amendment disproportionately affected the poor.

From 1926 to 1928 Donahey was mentioned as a possible candidate for president or vice president in the 1928 election. He received five delegate votes for the presidential nomination which went to Alfred E. Smith, but was not a candidate for the vice presidential nomination, which went to Joseph T. Robinson.

After leaving the governorship, Donahey returned to his business interests. In 1928, Donahey and six partners founded the Motorists’ Mutual Insurance Company of Columbus, of which Donahey became president.

== United States Senator ==
He won election to the United States Senate in 1934, unseating Republican Simeon Fess by a wide margin (1,276,208 to 839,068) and served one term in the Senate from 1935 until 1941. In 1940 Democrats in Ohio asked him to consider running for president as a favorite son in an effort to aid Franklin D. Roosevelt's bid for a third term, but he declined. (The plan would have had Ohio's delegates to the Democratic National Convention pledged to Donahey until Roosevelt became a candidate, at which point Donahey would release the delegates to Roosevelt.)

Donahey was president of the Donahey Clay Products Company. He was also a director of the Ohio National Bank of Columbus, Ohio.

== Death and burial ==
Donahey died at Grant Hospital in Columbus on April 8, 1946. He is buried in East Avenue Cemetery in New Philadelphia, Ohio.

== Family life ==
Donahey was married to Mary (Harvey) Donahey (1879–1953). His son, John W. Donahey, served a term as Lieutenant Governor of Ohio. His daughter-in-law, Gertrude Walton Donahey served as Ohio State Treasurer. His brother William Donahey was a Chicago Tribune columnist and creator of the Teenie Weenies comic strip. Another brother, James Harrison "Hal" Donahey, was the cartoonist for the Cleveland Plain Dealer and designed the household tiles made by the Donahey Clay Products Company.

== Legacy ==
The Donahey Agriculture & Horticulture Building at the Ohio Expo Center and State Fair in Columbus are named in honor of Donahey. Constructed in 1926, it was named for Donahey in 1977 after a previous building named for him, a horse barn, burned down in 1972.

== Authored books ==
- The Beak and Claws of America. Columbus, Ohio: R. C. Williams. 1931. OCLC 2672188.

Legal offices
Preceded by Edward M. Fullington	Ohio State Auditor; 1913–1921	Succeeded by Joseph T. Tracy
Political offices
Preceded by Harry L. Davis	Governor of Ohio; 1923–1929	Succeeded by Myers Y. Cooper
U.S. Senate
Preceded by Simeon D. Fess	United States Senator (Class 1) from Ohio; 1935–1941	Succeeded by Harold H. Burton
Party political offices
Preceded by James M. Cox	Democratic Party nominee for Governor of Ohio; 1920, 1922, 1924, 1926	Succeeded by Martin L. Davey
Preceded by Charles V. Truax	Democratic nominee for U.S. Senator from Ohio (Class 1); 1934	Succeeded by John McSweeney
