= Edward M. Fullington =

Ohio Republican politician and State Auditor

Edward McMullan Fullington
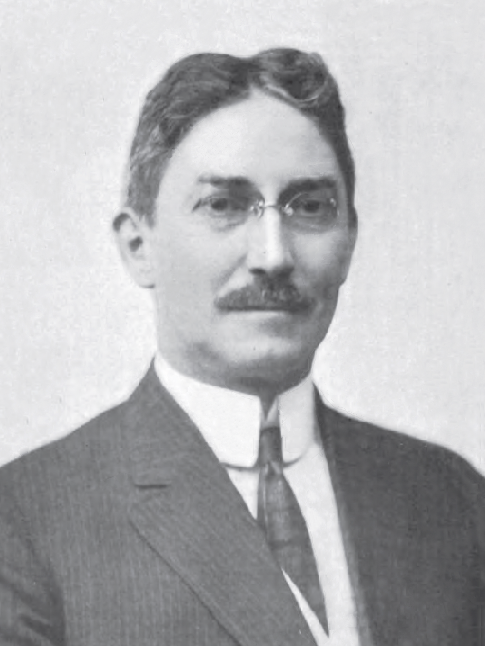
- c. 1912

17th Ohio State Auditor
- In office January 11, 1909 – January 13, 1913
- Governor: Judson Harmon
- Preceded by: Walter D. Guilbert
- Succeeded by: A. Victor Donahey

Personal details
- Born: August 25, 1864 Union County, Ohio, U.S.
- Died: November 8, 1927 (aged 63) Lake City, Florida, U.S.
- Resting place: Milford Center, Ohio
- Party: Republican
- Spouse: Ida Irvin Matthews
- Children: two

Military service
- Allegiance: United States
- Branch/service: Ohio National Guard
- Battles/wars: Spanish–American War

Edward McMullan Fullington (August 25, 1864 – November 8, 1927) was an American Republican politician from the U.S. state of Ohio who served as Ohio State Auditor from 1909–1913, and was later appointed auditor of the Philippines.

== Life and career ==
Fullington was born on his father's farm in Union Township, Union County, Ohio August 25, 1864. His parents were James and Eliza McMullan Fullington. He was educated in local schools and at Kenyon College. He went to Marysville, Ohio in 1888 to work in the Bank of Marysville, which had been established by his father.

Fullington was elected Auditor of Union County as a Republican in 1895, and re-elected without opposition in 1898. As president of the County Auditor's Association of the State of Ohio, he agitated for improvement of methods for keeping public accounts. The legislature passed a bill establishing a State Bureau of Inspection and Supervision of Public Offices, later to be known as the Bureau of Accounting. Fullington was named chief of this unit when his term as county auditor ended in 1902.

In 1904, the Legislature created the position Deputy Auditor of State, and Fullington was appointed to the position. He served as Deputy until he was elected Ohio State Auditor in 1908 for a term of 1909–1913.

For seven years, beginning 1898, Fullington served in the Ohio National Guard, including service throughout the Spanish–American War in Puerto Rico as Major and quartermaster. He was later named by the Secretary of War as Auditor of the Philippine Islands, October 8, 1921.

Edward M. Fullington was married to Ida Irvin Matthews in Dayton, Ohio November 25, 1891, and had two sons. He was a Mason, Elk, and member of Knights of Pythias and Trinity Episcopal Church. He died in 1927.
