= Emil Kiesewetter =

American politician (1845–1924)

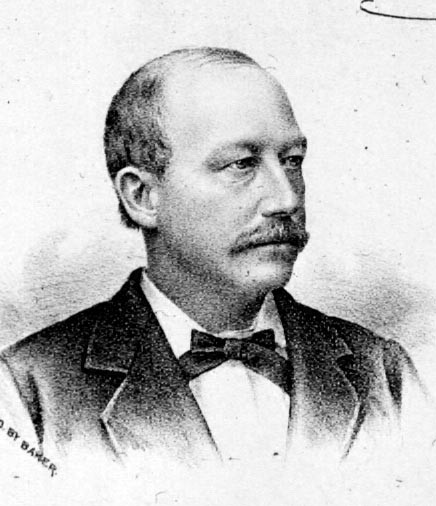
- circa 1880

14th Ohio State Auditor
- In office January 14, 1884 – January 9, 1888
- Governor: George Hoadly; Joseph B. Foraker
- Preceded by: John F. Oglevee
- Succeeded by: Ebenezer W. Poe

Personal details
- Born: May 15, 1845 Prairie Township, Franklin County, Ohio
- Died: October 28, 1924 (aged 79) Columbus, Ohio
- Resting place: Green Lawn Cemetery
- Party: Democratic
- Spouse: Francis Orthafer (m. 1869)
- Children: 2

Emil Kiesewetter (May 15, 1845 – October 28, 1924) was a Democratic politician in the U.S. State of Ohio. He was the Ohio State Auditor from 1884 to 1888.

Kiesewetter was born at Prairie Township, Franklin County, Ohio on May 15, 1845. His parents were Theodore and Joanna E. Kiesewetter, natives of Germany, who had emigrated to Franklin County in 1844. They stayed at Prairie Township until 1849, when they moved to Columbus, the state capital. The mother died in 1850 and the father died in 1874.

At age 12, Kiesewetter began working at a Columbus hotel. He went on to attend Columbus Commercial College in his later years, where he studied bookkeeping. He worked in that field until 1862.

On September 30, 1862, Kiesewetter enlisted as a private in Company B, 46th Ohio Infantry during the American Civil War. At the Battle of Resaca, he was severely injured in the left hip May 14, 1864. He was confined to a bed for seven months, as the wound became gangrenous. With treatment from a surgeon, he recovered, and was discharged at Camp Chase, Columbus, March 31, 1865. He remained at the camp as a clerk until August 25, when he hired on as a bookkeeper at a Columbus firm. He remained there until 1878.

In 1878, Kiesewetter was elected as Franklin County Auditor. He was nominated at the Democratic Party state convention in 1883 for Ohio State Auditor, and defeated Republican incumbent John F. Oglevee that autumn. He assumed the office January 1884.

While he was auditor, Kiesewetter fired two shots at a newspaper reporter W. J. Elliott on November 8, 1885, in a Columbus hotel. The reporter had criticized Kiesewetter in his paper. The shots missed their mark. Kiesewetter was arrested, and appeared November 16 before Mayor Charles C. Walcutt, who dismissed charges on the grounds that Kiesewetter had been provoked.

Kiesewetter ran for re-election in 1887, but lost to Republican Ebenezer W. Poe. He completed his term January 1888.

Kieswetter organized Ohio Savings Bank, where he became president in 1908 and chairman of the board in 1921. He was also involved in starting the Great Southern Hotel, Columbus Mutual Life Insurance Company, Columbus Railway Power and Light Company, and the Pauline Home for the Aged.

Kiesewetter died October 28, 1924, and was interred at Green Lawn Cemetery, Columbus, Ohio.

On November 4, 1869, Kiesewetter married Francis Orthafer, and had two sons. He was a member of the Masons, I.O.O.F., and Knights of Pythias.

== Notes ==
Political offices
Preceded by John F. Oglevee	Ohio State Auditor; 1884–1888	Succeeded by Ebenezer W. Poe
