= Guilbert (crater) =

Crater on Venus

Guilbert crater
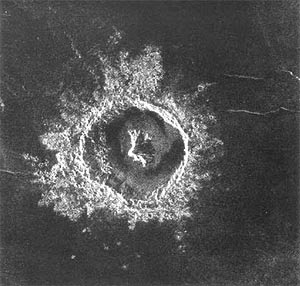
- Radar image of Guilbert
- Location: Venus
- Coordinates: 58.0°S 13.6°E
- Diameter: 25.5 km
- Eponym: Yvette Guilbert

Guilbert is a small 25.5 km diameter impact crater on the surface of Venus. It has a continuous ejecta radius of 16.3 km, and a wall width of 2.5 km.

Its name derives after Yvette Guilbert. It was accepted by the IAU in the year 1991.

== Surrounding geology ==
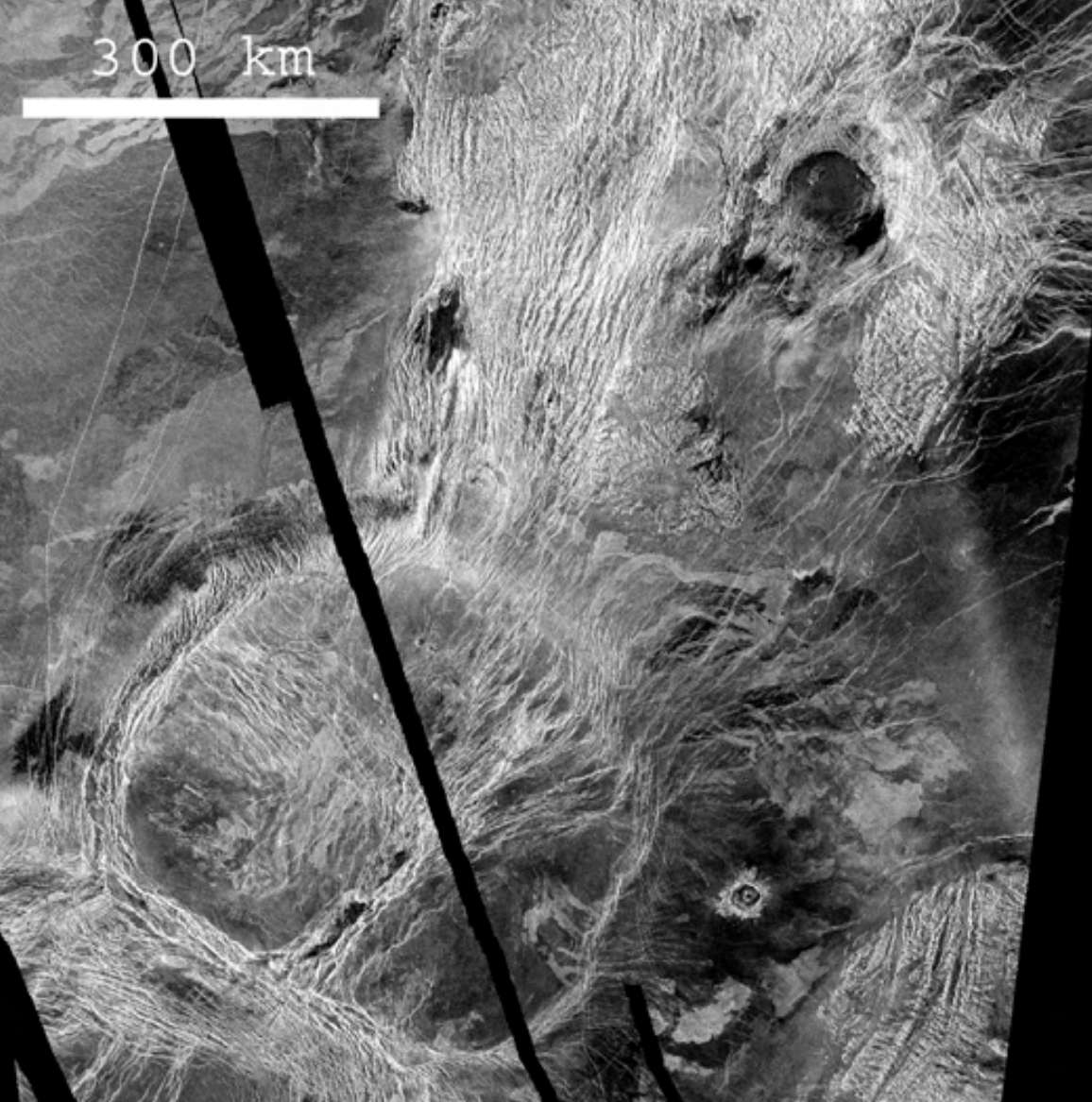
Radar image of Venus, centered on 55° S, 10° E. Llhamo Tessera (large feature cutting diagonally from top right), Eithinoha Corona (large rim below and to the left of the center, up to 2 km above surrounding ground). Hsueh T’ao Crater (dark feature in the upper right corner) and Guilbert Crater (light spot in the lower right quadrant).

The physical environment immediately surrounding the crater includes:

- Lhamo Tessera, a remnant of an ancient tessera plateau (a complex ridged terrain experiencing intense multi-directional deformation).
- Eithinoha Corona, a large (400 km in diameter) circular structure categorized as a corona (a near-circular volcanotectonic feature).
- Hsueh T'ao Crater, a young, mid-size impact crater to the north.
