= Robert Walker Tayler Sr. =

American politician

Robert Walker Tayler
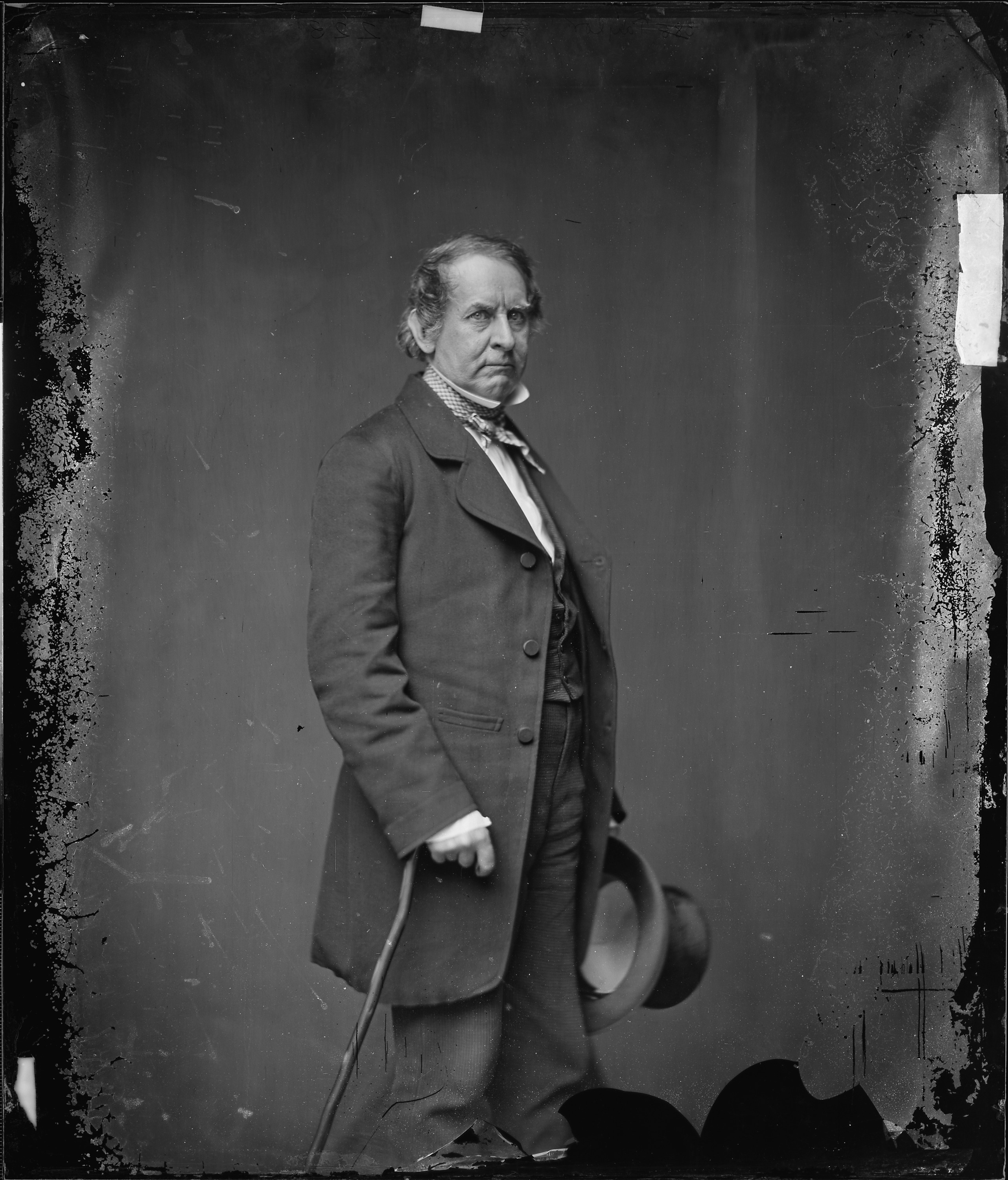

9th Ohio State Auditor
- In office January 9, 1860 – April 1863
- Preceded by: Francis Mastin Wright
- Succeeded by: Oviatt Cole

First Comptroller of the Treasury
- In office January 14, 1863 – February 25, 1878
- Preceded by: Elisha Whittlesey
- Succeeded by: Albert G. Porter

Mayor of Youngstown, Ohio
- In office 1851–1852
- Preceded by: John Heiner
- Succeeded by: Stephen F. Burnett

Member of the Ohio Senate from the 23rd district
- In office January 7, 1856 – January 1, 1860
- Preceded by: Ira Norris
- Succeeded by: Jacob Dolson Cox

Personal details
- Born: November 9, 1812 Harrisburg, Pennsylvania, U.S.
- Died: February 25, 1878 (aged 65) Washington, D.C., U.S.
- Party: Republican
- Spouse(s): Louisa Woodbridge; Rachel Kirtland Wick
- Children: 14

Robert Walker Tayler Sr. (November 9, 1812 – February 25, 1878) was a Republican politician in the U.S. State of Ohio who was a member of the Ohio Senate and was Ohio State Auditor 1860–1863.

Robert Tayler was born at Harrisburg, Pennsylvania. He was moved to Youngstown, Ohio as an infant. He studied law, and was admitted to the bar in Trumbull County. In 1839, he was elected Prosecuting Attorney of Trumbull County, serving four years. He then moved back to Youngstown. In 1851, he was elected Mayor of Youngstown.

In 1855 and 1857, Tayler was elected to represent the 23rd district in the Ohio Senate for the 52nd and 53rd General Assemblies (1856–1859). In 1859, he defeated Democrat Godwin Volney Dorsey for Ohio State Auditor, taking office in 1860. He resigned when, in 1863, he was appointed First Comptroller of the United States Treasury by President Lincoln. He held that office 15 years, and was known as the "watch-dog of the Treasury". He died in Washington in 1878.

Tayler's first wife was Louisa Woodbridge, sister of Timothy, and they had seven children, including Robert Walker Tayler, a federal judge and Congressman. Tayler's second wife was Rachel Kirtland Wick, daughter of Caleb Wick. They had seven children, including Wick Tayler of the Ohio House of Representatives.

== Notes ==
Political offices
Preceded by Francis M. Wright	Ohio State Auditor; 1860–1863	Succeeded by Oviatt Cole
Preceded by Elisha Whittlesey	First Comptroller of the United States Treasury; 1863–1878	Succeeded by Albert G. Porter
Preceded by John Heiner	Mayor of Youngstown, Ohio; 1851–1852	Succeeded by Stephen F. Burnett
Ohio Senate
Preceded by Ira Norris	Senator from 23rd District; 1856–1859	Succeeded by Jacob Dolson Cox
