= James H. Godman =

American politician

James Harper Godman
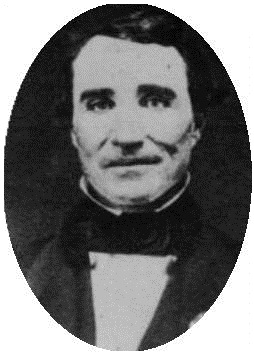

11th Ohio State Auditor
- In office January 11, 1864 – January 8, 1872
- Governor: John Brough; Charles Anderson; Jacob Dolson Cox; Rutherford B. Hayes
- Preceded by: Oviatt Cole
- Succeeded by: James Williams

Personal details
- Born: October 19, 1808 Berkeley County, Virginia, US
- Died: October 4, 1891 (aged 82) Marion, Ohio, US
- Resting place: Marion Cemetery
- Party: Republican

Military service
- Allegiance: United States
- Branch/service: Union Army
- Years of service: April 25, 1861-July 28, 1863
- Rank: Colonel; Bvt. Brigadier General
- Commands: 4th Ohio Infantry
- Battles/wars: American Civil War: Battle of Fredericksburg

James Harper Godman (October 19, 1808 – October 4, 1891) was a Republican politician in the U.S. State of Ohio who was a member of the Ohio House of Representatives and Ohio Senate, and was Ohio State Auditor for eight years, (1864–1872). He was also a Union Army soldier in the American Civil War.

== Biography ==
James H. Godman was born in Berkeley County, Virginia (now West Virginia), and ultimately relocated to Marion, Ohio, where he was admitted to the bar in 1828.

In 1835, Godman was elected to represent Marion and Crawford Counties in the Ohio House of Representatives for the 34th General Assembly, and won again in 1839 for the 38th General Assembly. In 1840 and 1841, he won election to the Ohio Senate for the 39th and 40th General Assemblies.

Godman enlisted April 26, 1861 as a Major in the Union Army during the American Civil War in the 4th Ohio Infantry, promoted to lieutenant colonel January 9, 1862, and to colonel November 29, 1862. He was severely wounded at Fredericksburg and honorably discharged July 28, 1863. March 13, 1865 he received the rank brevet brigadier general. He was elected as a Republican for State Auditor in 1863, and re-elected in 1867, serving eight years.

While a resident of Marion, Godman help attract the first railroad through the town. His family legacy also lives on withnthe establishment of Columbus, Ohio's Godman Guild, a settlement house. The organization is today known as the Godman Guild Association.

Godman died October 4, 1891.

== Notes ==
Political offices
| Preceded by Oviatt Cole | Ohio State Auditor; 1864–1872 | Succeeded by James Williams |
Ohio House of Representatives
| Preceded by John Campbell | Representative from Marion and Crawford Counties; 1835-1836 | Succeeded by Otway Curry; John Carey |
| Preceded by Stephen Fowler | Representative from Marion County; 1839-1840 | Succeeded by – |
Ohio Senate
| Preceded by Benjamin F. Allen | Senator from Delaware, Marion, Crawford and Union Counties; 1840-1842 | Succeeded by Joseph McCutchen |
