= Francis Mastin Wright =

American politician

8th Ohio State Auditor
- In office January 14, 1856 – January 9, 1860
- Governor: Salmon P. Chase
- Preceded by: William Duane Morgan
- Succeeded by: Robert W. Tayler

Personal details
- Born: July 14, 1810 Frederick County, Virginia, U.S.
- Died: January 16, 1869 (aged 58) Urbana, Ohio, U.S.
- Party: Republican
- Other political affiliations: Whig

Francis Mastin Wright (July 14, 1810 – January 16, 1869) was a Republican politician in the U.S. State of Ohio who was Ohio State Auditor (1856–1860).

Francis Wright was born in Frederick County, Virginia, and ended up in Clark County, Ohio, where he was educated in the country schools. He was a merchant in Springfield, Ohio and later Urbana, Ohio. He was elected as a Whig for County Auditor of Champaign County.

In 1855, as a Republican, he defeated incumbent Democrat William Duane Morgan for Ohio State Auditor, but declined a second term. He returned to Urbana in 1860, and was appointed Internal Revenue Collector by President Lincoln. He resigned in 1867 and died at Urbana January 16, 1869.

== Notes ==
Political offices
Preceded by William Duane Morgan	Ohio State Auditor; 1856–1860	Succeeded by Robert W. Tayler
