= James Williams (Ohio politician) =

Republican politician in the U.S. State of Ohio

12th Ohio State Auditor
- In office January 8, 1872 – January 12, 1880
- Governor: Edward F. Noyes; William Allen; Rutherford B. Hayes; Thomas L. Young; Richard M. Bishop
- Preceded by: James H. Godman
- Succeeded by: John F. Oglevee

Member of the Ohio House of Representatives from the Champaign County district
- In office January 5, 1852 – January 1, 1854
- Preceded by: John T. Burnet; J. Rayburn
- Succeeded by: James M. Maitland

Personal details
- Born: May 21, 1822 Prince George's County, Maryland
- Died: November, 1892 Mechanicsburg, Ohio
- Party: Republican
- Spouse: Sarah Staley

James Williams (May 21, 1822 – November 1892) was a Republican politician in the U.S. State of Ohio who was in the Ohio House of Representatives, and was Ohio State Auditor 1872–1880.

James Williams was born in Prince George's County, Maryland, and moved with his family to Mechanicsburg, Champaign County, Ohio in 1831. He was educated, studied medicine, and was admitted to practice in 1843. In 1849, he caught Gold Fever, and went to California.

When Williams returned to Champaign County in 1851, he was elected to the Ohio House of Representatives for the 50th General Assembly in 1852–1853.

In 1856, Williams went to the State Capitol in Columbus with Ohio State Auditor Francis M. Wright, and served for sixteen years as clerk, chief clerk and deputy in the office. He was elected as State Auditor in 1871 and re-elected in 1875, serving eight years.

Williams died at his home in Mechanicsburg in November, 1892. He was married to Sarah Staley of Champaign County in 1848.

== Notes ==
Political offices
| Preceded by James H. Godman | Ohio State Auditor; 1872-1880 | Succeeded by John F. Oglevee |
Ohio House of Representatives
| Preceded by John T. Burnet; J. Rayburn | Representative from Champaign County; 1852 | Succeeded by James M. Maitland |
