= William Duane Morgan =

American journalist

7th Ohio State Auditor
- In office January 12, 1852 – January 14, 1856
- Governor: Reuben Wood; William Medill
- Preceded by: John Woods
- Succeeded by: Francis Mastin Wright

Personal details
- Born: 1817 Washington County, Pennsylvania, U.S.
- Died: 1887 (aged 69–70) Newark, Ohio, U.S.
- Party: Democratic

William Duane Morgan (1817–1887) was a newspaper editor and Democratic politician. He owned papers in the U.S. states of Pennsylvania and later Ohio. He was also Ohio State Auditor 1852–1856.

William Duane Morgan was born to a prominent family in Washington County, Pennsylvania. In 1837, he and his brother, Thomas Jefferson Morgan, owned and edited the Washington County Democratic newspaper Our Country.

In 1840 he moved to New Lisbon, Ohio, where he owned the Ohio Patriot. He was nominated at the state Democratic Party convention for Ohio State Auditor in 1851, and defeated his Free Soil Party and incumbent Whig opponents in the general election. He served a four-year term, but was defeated by Republican Francis Mastin Wright for re-election. He then owned the Newark Advocate in Newark, Ohio from 1856 to 1880. He died in 1887.
