= Walter D. Guilbert =

American politician (1844–1911)

Walter Downey Guilbert
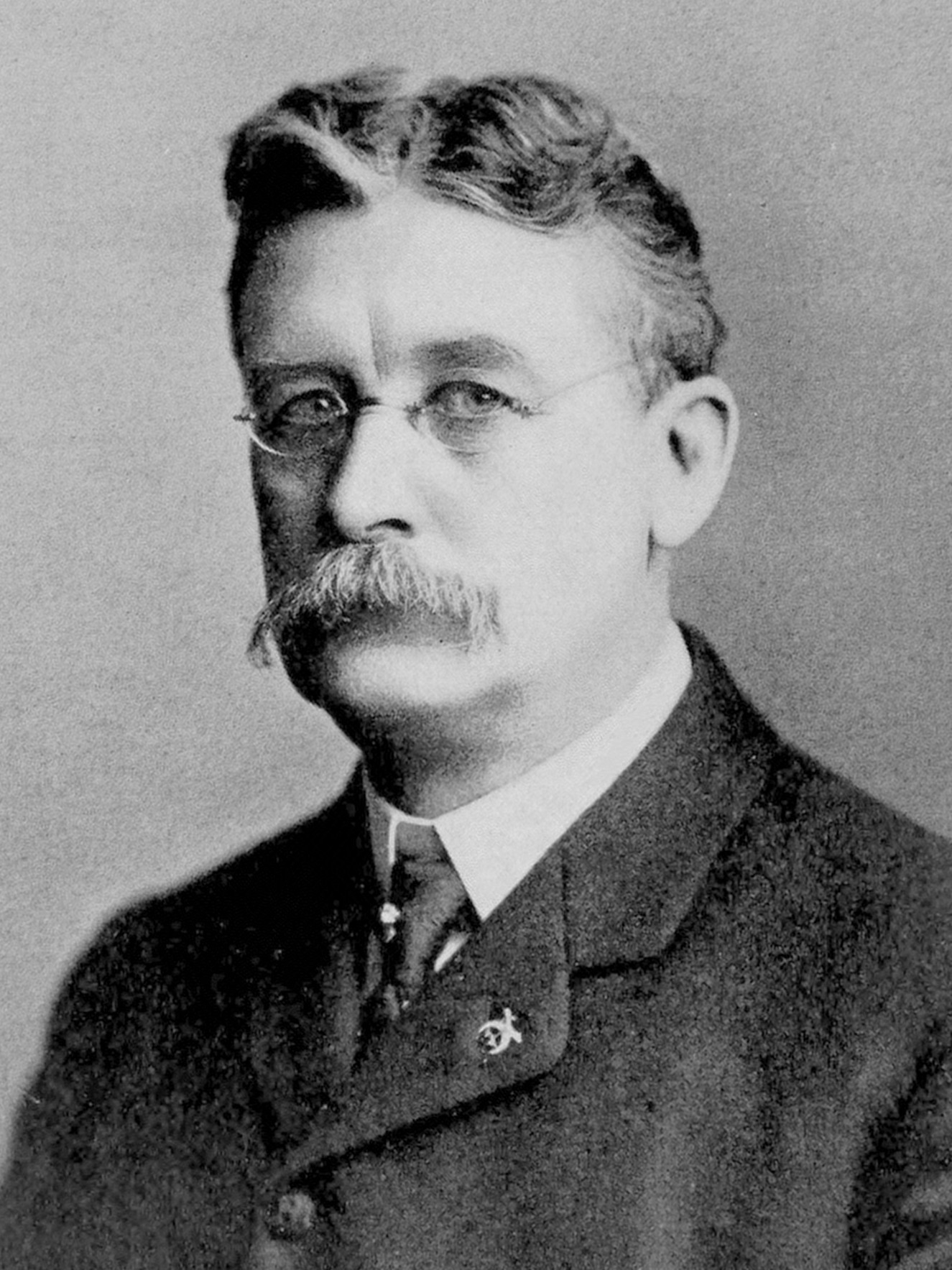

16th Ohio State Auditor
- In office January 13, 1896 – January 11, 1909
- Preceded by: Ebenezer W. Poe
- Succeeded by: Edward M. Fullington

Personal details
- Born: February 11, 1844 Guernsey County, Ohio
- Died: February 15, 1911 (aged 67) Columbus, Ohio
- Resting place: Green Lawn Cemetery
- Party: Republican
- Spouse: Mary L. Jordon
- Children: three

Walter Downey Guilbert (February 11, 1844 – February 15, 1911) was an American politician and businessman. He was the Ohio State Auditor from 1896 to 1909. Guilbert was a Republican.

== Early life ==
Guilbert was born on February 11, 1844, at Guernsey County, Ohio. He grew up on a farm. His parents were Margaret (née Downey) and Heiller E. Guilbert, who emigrated from France as a child, and settled in Guernsey County in the 1830s.

Guilbert studied in local schools and the Wenona Academy in Wenona, Illinois. After leaving school, he remained in the Midwest until 1869.

== Career ==
Guilbert moved to South Olive, Ohio, in 1864, where he manufactured staves until 1881. In 1871, he formed the South Olive Salt Company with A. Haines, J. W. Campbell, and P. M. Jordan and purchased a salt well in South Olive, Ohio from the Syracuse Oil and Salt Company. Guilbert and David Gouchenour bought out the other partners in 1875. They drilled a new well in 1876. In 1877, the original well became an oil well that produced 350 barrels before going dry. Guilbert and his partner operated the salt business until 1877, when the value of salt dropped significantly.

In 1881, Guilbert was elected auditor of Noble County, Ohio as a Republican. He was re-elected in 1884. In 1886, he served on the town council of Caldwell, Ohio. Guilbert was the treasurer. of the Caldwell Building and Loan Association. He was a director of the Caldwell District Fair committee.

In 1888, Guilbert was appointed chief clerk of the Office of Auditor of State and continued to work in that capacity until 1896. In 1895, Guilbert was nominated as Republican candidate for Ohio Auditor of State and was elected in the fall of 1895. He began serving a four-year term as Ohio State Auditor on January 13, 1896. He was reeelected in 1899. He was the Ohio State Auditor until 1909.

Guilbert was active in the Republican Party, serving as the chairman of the Noble County Committee and a member of the state executive committee. He was a delegate to the 1888 Republican National Convention and the 1904 Republican National Convention.

== Personal life ==
Guilbert married Mary L. Jordan of Noble County, Ohio, on February 2, 1868. The couple had two sons and one daughter.

He was a member of the Freemasons, belonging to the Noble Lodge No. 459 of the Free and Accepted Masons and serving as its treasurer. He was a 33rd degree Scottish Rite Mason and also passed the Knights Templar degree. He was a member of the Mystic Shrine, the Independent Order of Odd Fellows, the Knights of Pythias, and the Improved Order of Red Men.

Guilbert died from Bright's disease on February 15, 1911 at his home in Columbus, Ohio. He was buried with Masonic honors. He was interred at Green Lawn Cemetery in Columbus, Ohio.

Political offices
Preceded by Ebenezer W. Poe	Ohio State Auditor; 1896-1909	Succeeded by Edward M. Fullington
