= 1944 Democratic Party presidential primaries =

Selection of the Democratic Party nominee

- March 14 to May 19, 1944
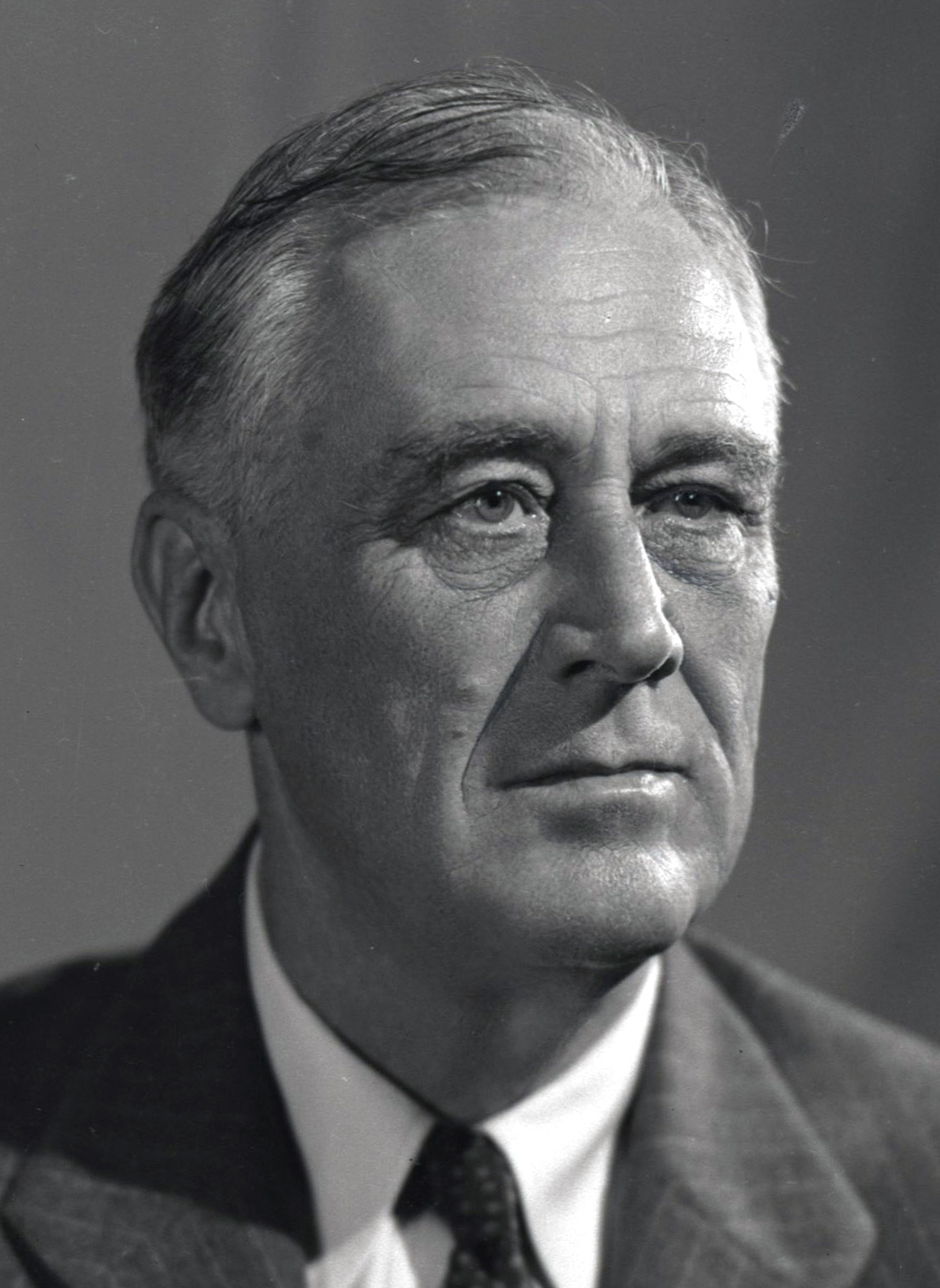

Candidate	Franklin D. Roosevelt	Uncommitted	Claude R. Linger
Home state	New York	–	West Virginia
Contests won	7	6	1
Popular vote	1,324,006	478,567	59,282
Percentage	70.9%	25.6%	3.2%
Franklin D. Roosevelt
Claude R. Linger
Unpledged
Previous Democratic nominee
Franklin D. Roosevelt
Democratic nominee
Franklin D. Roosevelt

Presidential primaries were organized by the Democratic Party to select delegates to determine the party's nominees in the 1944 United States presidential election. Voting took place from March 14 to May 19, 1944, in 14 U.S. states. The incumbent president of the United States Franklin D. Roosevelt won the majority of contests and was nominated for an unprecedented fourth term by the 1944 Democratic National Convention.

== Contests ==
Date	Contest	Popular vote		
Date	Contest	Roosevelt	Uncommitted	Others
March 14	New Hampshire	—	6,772 (Note: Votes for formally unpledged pro-Roosevelt delegates.) (100.0%)	—
April 5	Wisconsin	49,632 (94.3%)	—	3,014 (5.7%)
April 11	Illinois	47,961 (99.3%)	—	343 (0.3%)
April 11	Nebraska	37,405 (99.2%)	—	319 (0.8%)
April 25	Massachusetts	—	57,299 (100.0%)	—
April 25	Pennsylvania	322,469 (99.7%)	—	961 (0.3%)
May 2	Alabama	—	116,922 (100.0%)	—
May 2	Florida	—	118,518 (Note: Split between pro-Roosevelt and pro-Byrd delegates.) (100.0%)	—
May 2	South Dakota	—	14,141 (Note: Split between two pro-Roosevelt lists.) (100.0%)	—
May 9	Ohio	—	164,915 (100.0%)	—
May 9	West Virginia	—	—	59,282 (Note: Votes for Claude R. Linger.) (100.0%)
May 16	California	770,222 (100.0%)	—	—
May 16	New Jersey	16,884 (99.6%)	—	60 (Note: Votes for Thomas E. Dewey.) (0.4%)
May 19	Oregon	79,833 (98.7%)	—	1,057 (1.3%)
TOTAL		1,324,006 (70.9%)	478,567 (25.6%)	65,036 (3.5%)

== See also ==
- 1944 Republican Party presidential primaries
- White primary

== Bibliography ==
- Congressional Quarterly (2010). Congressional Quarterly's Guide to U.S. Elections (6th ed.). Washington D.C.: Congressional Quarterly.
- McGillivray, Alice V.; Scammon, Richard M. (1994). America at the Polls, 1920–1956: Harding to Eisenhower. Washington, D.C.: Congressional Quarterly.
