= Joseph T. Ferguson =

American politician (1892–1979)

20th and 27th Ohio State Auditor
- In office January 11, 1971 – January 13, 1975
- Governor: John J. Gilligan
- Preceded by: Roger Cloud
- Succeeded by: Thomas E. Ferguson
- In office January 11, 1937 – January 12, 1953
- Governor: Martin L. Davey; John W. Bricker; Frank Lausche; Thomas J. Herbert; Frank Lausche
- Preceded by: Joseph T. Tracy
- Succeeded by: James A. Rhodes

Ohio State Treasurer
- In office January 12, 1959 – January 14, 1963
- Governor: Michael DiSalle
- Preceded by: Roger W. Tracey
- Succeeded by: John D. Herbert

Personal details
- Born: May 12, 1892 Shawnee, Ohio, U.S.
- Died: October 22, 1979 (aged 87) Columbus, Ohio, U.S.
- Party: Democratic

Joseph T. Ferguson (May 12, 1892 – October 22, 1979) was an American politician and perennial candidate from Ohio who participated in the Democratic Party. He served as Auditor of State for 18 years and as Treasurer of State of Ohio for 4 years. His nickname was Jumpin' Joe. Both Ferguson and his son, Thomas E. Ferguson, served as Auditor of State of Ohio. From 1937 to 1995, the Ferguson dynasty held the position for 40 of the 58 years.

== Career ==
Joseph T. Ferguson was born in Perry County in 1892. Not much is known about his private life. He ran unsuccessfully in 1928 for the Office of the Auditor of State of Ohio. His candidacy in 1936 was successful. He was re-elected three times as a result. In his fourth re-election in 1952, he suffered a defeat. Ferguson held the post of Auditor of State from 1937 to 1953. During this time he ran in 1944 for the Democratic nomination for the office of President of the United States. He participated in 1944, 1960 and 1972 as a delegate to the Democratic National Conventions. In 1950, he ran unsuccessfully for a seat in the United States Senate. From 1959 to 1963, Ferguson was Treasurer of the State of Ohio. From 1971 to 1975 he then again held the post of Auditor of State of Ohio.

In 1974, the ACLU of Ohio filed a lawsuit against Ferguson, who was withholding state payments for abortions of state Welfare recipients. Roe v. Ferguson proceeded on Spetermber 16, 1974 in the United States District Court for the Southern District of Ohio.

Ferguson was a member of the Knights of Columbus, the Eagles, Moose, Grange, and the Benevolent and Protective Order of Elks.

Party political offices
Preceded by	Democratic nominee for Auditor of Ohio; 1936, 1940, 1944, 1948, 1952, 1956	Succeeded by David Pepper
Preceded by William G. Pickrel	Democratic nominee for U.S. Senator from Ohio (Class 3); 1950	Succeeded by Thomas A. Burke
Preceded by John J. Gallagher	Democratic nominee for Treasurer of Ohio; 1954	Succeeded by John W. Donahey
Preceded by John W. Donahey	Democratic nominee for Treasurer of Ohio; 1958	Succeeded by Thomas E. Ferguson
Preceded by Thomas E. Ferguson	Democratic nominee for Auditor of Ohio; 1970	Succeeded by Thomas E. Ferguson
