= 133rd Ohio Infantry Regiment =

- Active: May 6, 1864, to August 20, 1864
- Country: United States
- Allegiance: Union
- Branch: Infantry

Insignia
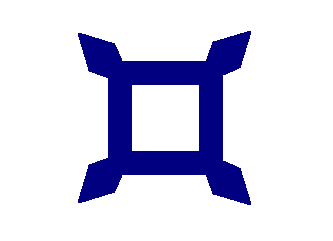
- 3rd Division, X Corps

The 133rd Ohio Infantry Regiment, sometimes 133rd Ohio Volunteer Infantry (or 133rd OVI) was an infantry regiment in the Union Army during the American Civil War.

== Service ==
The 133rd Ohio Infantry was organized by consolidation of the 58th and 76th Battalions of the Ohio National Guard and mustered in May 6, 1864, for 100 days service under the command of Colonel Gustavus L. Innis.

The regiment was attached to 1st Brigade, 3rd Division, X Corps, Army of the James.

The 133rd Ohio Infantry mustered out of service at Columbus, Ohio, on August 20, 1864.

== Detailed service ==
Moved to Parkersburg, W. Va., May 6; then to New Creek May 8. Duty at New Creek until June 7. Moved to Washington, D.C., June 7; then to Bermuda Hundred, Va., arriving June 12. On 16 June the First Division of the First Brigade, which this unit was assigned to, was ordered to destroy the Richmond and Petersburg Railroad. The 133rd was then assigned to a battery which, with other troops, succeeded in holding the Confederates at bay for 5 hours. On July 17 the regiment embarked from Point of Rocks to Fort Powhatan where they built fortifications and repaired telephone wires. On the tenth of August the regiment returned to Washington DC before returning to Camp Chase where it was mustered out August 20, 1864 its term of service having expired.

== Ohio National Guard ==
Over 35,000 Ohio National Guardsmen were federalized and organized into regiments for 100 days service in May 1864. Shipped to the Eastern Theater, they were designed to be placed in "safe" rear areas to protect railroads and supply points, thereby freeing regular troops for Lt. Gen. Ulysses S. Grant’s push on the Confederate capital of Richmond, Virginia. As events transpired, many units found themselves in combat, stationed in the path of Confederate Gen. Jubal Early’s veteran Army of the Valley during its famed Valley Campaigns of 1864. Ohio Guard units met the battle-tested foe head on and helped blunt the Confederate offensive thereby saving Washington, D.C. from capture. Ohio National Guard units participated in the battles of Monacacy, Fort Stevens, Harpers Ferry, and in the siege of Petersburg.

== Casualties ==
The regiment lost 31 men during service; 1 enlisted men killed, 1 officer and 29 enlisted men due to disease.

== Commanders ==
- Colonel Gustavus L. Innis

== Notable members ==
- Private Joseph Olds Gregg, Company F - Medal of Honor recipient for action near the Richmond & Petersburg Railroad, June 16, 1864

== See also ==
- List of Ohio Civil War units
- Ohio in the Civil War
