= Roger Tracy =

American politician from Ohio (1938–2007)

Member of the Ohio House of Representatives from the 60th district
- In office January 3, 1967 – December 31, 1970
- Preceded by: At Large District
- Succeeded by: James Baumann

Personal details
- Born: September 27, 1938
- Died: September 27, 2007 (aged 69)
- Party: Republican

Roger W. Tracy, Jr. (September 27, 1938 – September 27, 2007) was a member of the Ohio House of Representatives.

Party political offices
Preceded by Roger Cloud	Republican nominee for Ohio State Auditor; 1970, 1974	Succeeded by Donald "Buz" Lukens
