= Joseph T. Tracy =

American politician from Ohio (1865–1952)

Joseph Trimble Tracy

19th Ohio State Auditor
- In office January 10, 1921 – January 11, 1937
- Governor: Harry L. Davis; A. Victor Donahey; Myers Y. Cooper; George White; Martin L. Davey
- Preceded by: A. Victor Donahey
- Succeeded by: Joseph T. Ferguson

Personal details
- Born: December 28, 1865 Mt. Pleasant, Henry County, Iowa
- Died: January 2, 1952 (aged 86) Columbus, Ohio
- Resting place: Green Lawn Cemetery
- Party: Republican
- Spouse: Alnore Anne Arnold
- Children: 5

Joseph Trimble Tracy (December 28, 1865 – January 2, 1952), was a Republican politician from the U.S. State of Ohio. He was the Ohio State Auditor for sixteen years.

== Life and career ==
Joseph T. Tracy was born while his parents, Noah and Nancy Ann Freeman Tracy, were living temporarily at Mt. Pleasant, Henry County, Iowa on December 28, 1865. Shortly after his birth, they moved back to Scioto County, Ohio, where Joseph grew up on a farm. He attended the Normal School at West Union, Ohio, and was a school teacher and county school examiner for five years. He then was deputy clerk of courts for Scioto County.

From 1893 to 1899, Tracy was County Auditor for Scioto County. In 1902, he was appointed municipal supervisor in the Bureau of Inspection and Supervision of Public Offices in the State Auditor's Department. He held that office for fourteen years, and helped establish accounting systems in seventy cities. He developed a statewide reputation that lead to his election as a Republican to Ohio State Auditor in 1920. He was re-elected in 1924, 1928 and 1932. He ran for Auditor again in 1940, but lost.

Tracy was married to Alnore Arnold of Portsmouth, Ohio on April 11, 1894. She died January 9, 1921, the day before Tracy was first inaugurated as Auditor. She had five children. Son Roger W. Tracy and grandson Roger W. Tracy, Jr. were also Ohio politicians. Alnore was buried at Green Lawn Cemetery, Columbus, Ohio. Joseph T. Tracy was a member of the Masonic Fraternity, Knights of Pythias, and the King Avenue Methodist Church in Columbus.

Joseph T. Tracy died at Columbus on January 2, 1952, and is buried at Green Lawn Cemetery.

== External sources ==
- "Photo of Joseph Tracy from about 1925". Columbus Metropolitan Library.

Party political offices
Preceded by Hays M. Adams	Republican nominee for Ohio State Auditor; 1920, 1924, 1928, 1932, 1936, 1940	Succeeded by Roger W. Tracy
Political offices
Preceded by A. Victor Donahey	Ohio State Auditor; 1921–1937	Succeeded by Joseph T. Ferguson
