= Charles Reemelin =

American Politician and Author

Charles G. Reemelin
- Karl Gustav Rümelin
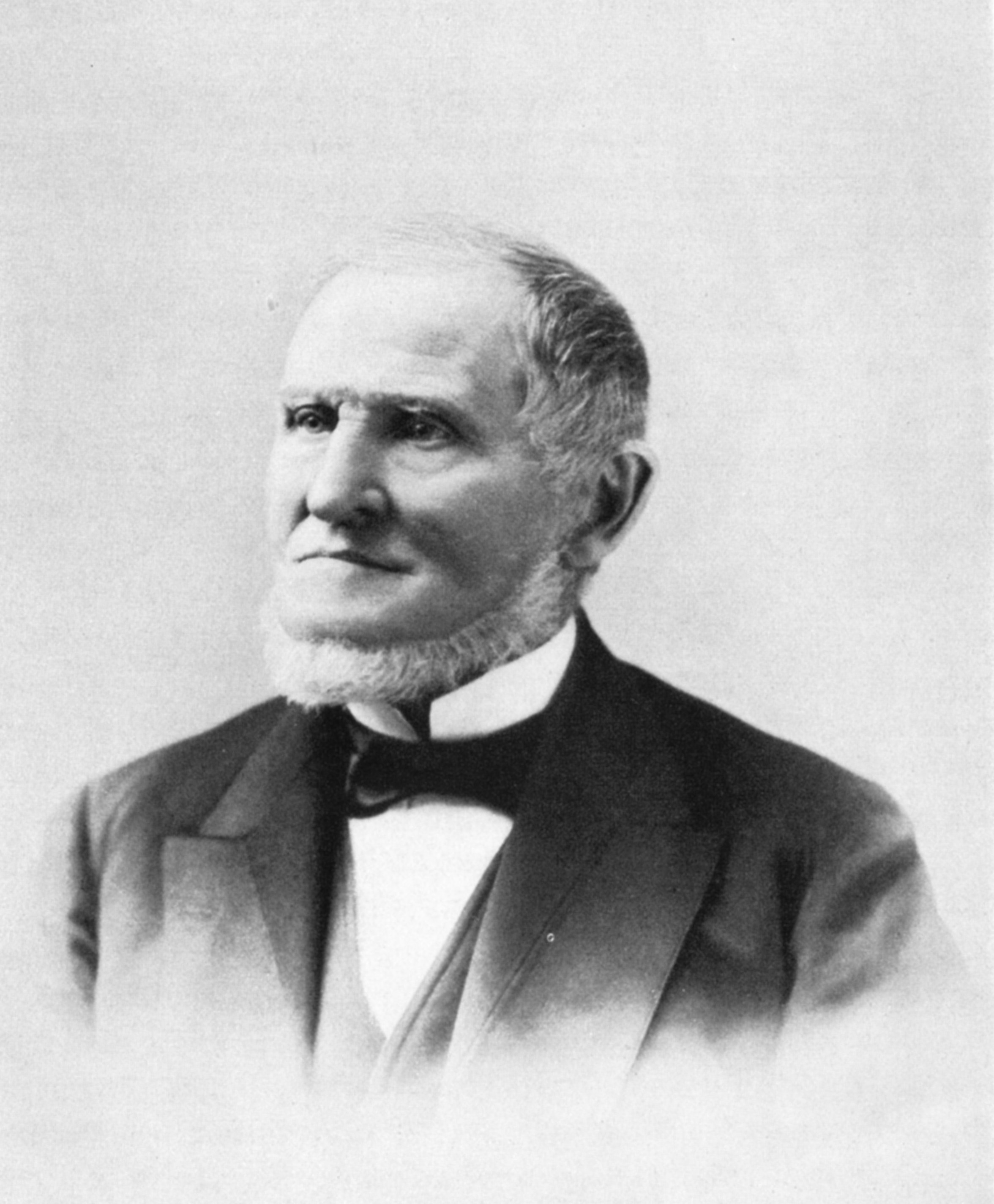
- Born: May 19, 1814; Heilbronn, Germany
- Died: January 15, 1896 (aged 81)
- Political party: Democratic
- Spouse: Lisa Columbina Maerk
- Children: Louis Reemelin (1852-1911)
- Parents: Benjamin Rümelin (father); Johanne Caroline Boettinger (mother)

Karl Gustav Rümelin, later Charles Reemelin (May 19, 1814, in Heilbronn, Germany – January 16, 1896, in Cincinnati, Ohio) was an American politician, author, lawyer and insurance salesman of German origin.

== Life ==
Charles Reemelin was the son of the spice dealer Benjamin Rümelin. He emigrated to the United States at the age of 18. He arrived in Philadelphia with the American brig Isabella after 87 days.

After his emigration in 1832, Karl Gustav Rümelin changed his name to Charles Gustus Reemelin. He was a pioneer for Carl Schurz, a Close friend of Salmon Chase, and politically active as a supporter of the Democratic Party. He was elected to the Ohio House of Representatives in 1844, a member of the Ohio Senate in 1846, and a member of the convention for the state's new constitution in 1850.
