= Ohio Auditor of State =

Public office in Ohio

Auditor of State of Ohio
- Seal of the Auditor of State

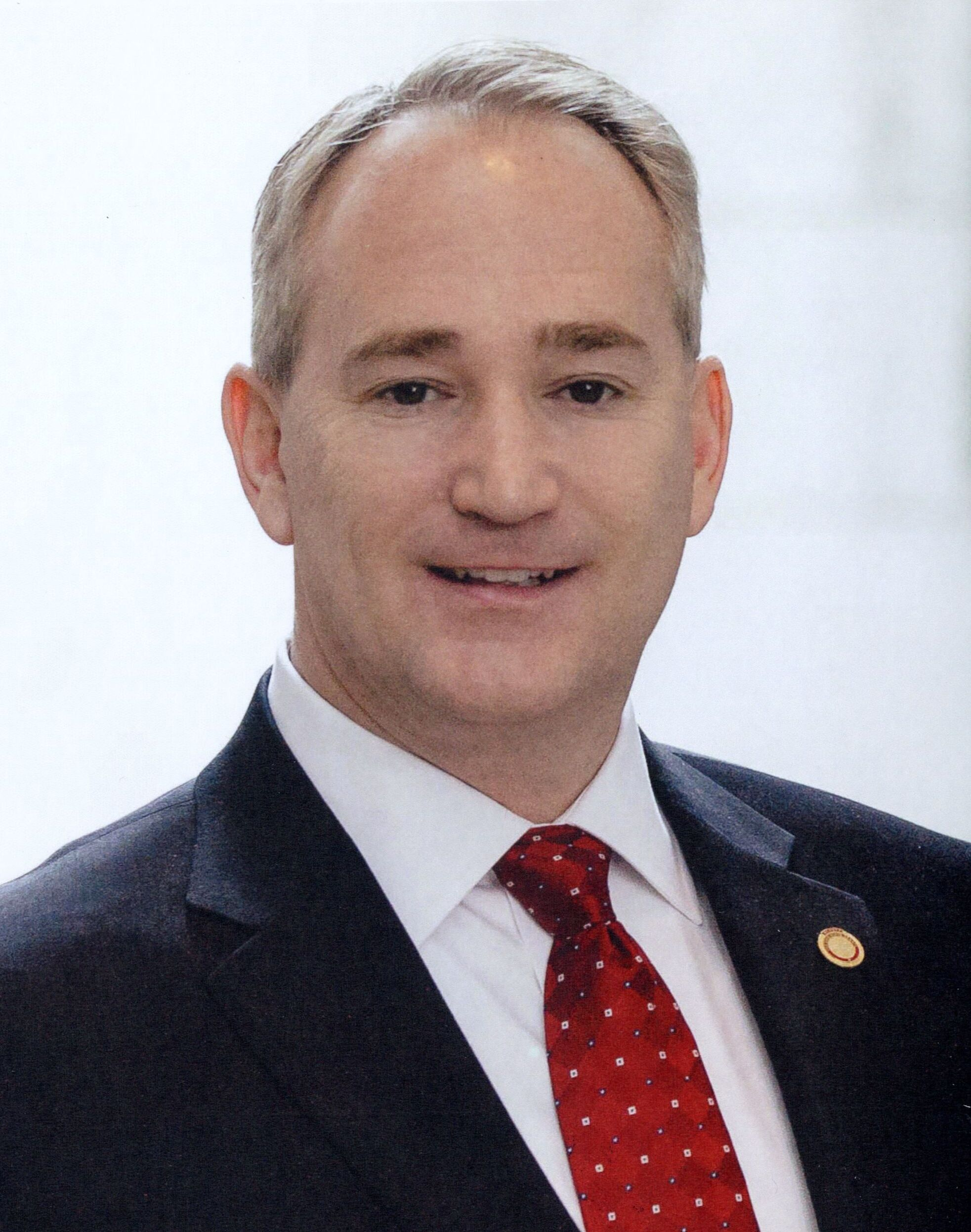
- Incumbent; Keith Faber since January 14, 2019
- Style: The Honorable
- Term length: Four years, two term limit
- Inaugural holder: Thomas Gibson; 1803
- Formation: Ohio Constitution
- Succession: Sixth
- Salary: $109,554
- Website: Office of the Auditor of State of Ohio

The Ohio Auditor of State is responsible for auditing all the public offices of the state of Ohio. The auditor is elected to a four-year term. The current auditor is Keith Faber.

Term	Image	Name	Party	Notes
1803–1808		Thomas Gibson	Democratic-Republican	
1808–1815		Benjamin Hough	Democratic-Republican	
1815–1833		Ralph Osborn	Democratic-Republican	
1833–1839		John A. Bryan		
1839–1845		John Brough	Democratic	
1845–1852		John Woods	Whig	
1852–1856		William Duane Morgan	Democratic	
1856–1860		Francis M. Wright	Republican	
1860–1863		Robert W. Tayler	Republican	Resigned April, 1863.
1863–1864		Oviatt Cole	Republican	
1864–1872		James H. Godman	Republican	
1872–1880		James Williams	Republican	
1880–1884		John F. Oglevee	Republican	
1884–1888		Emil Kiesewetter	Democratic	
1888–1896		Ebenezer W. Poe	Republican	
1896–1909		Walter D. Guilbert	Republican	
1909–1913		Edward M. Fullington	Republican	
1913–1921		A. Victor Donahey	Democratic	
1921–1937		Joseph T. Tracy	Republican	
1937–1953		Joseph T. Ferguson	Democratic	
1953–1963		James A. Rhodes	Republican	resigned
1963–1964		Roger W. Tracy, Jr.	Republican	died in office
1964–1965		Chester W. Goble	Republican	appointed
1965–1966		Roger Cloud	Republican	appointed
1966–1967		Archer E. Reilly	Republican	
1967–1971		Roger Cloud (2nd term)	Republican	
1971–1975		Joseph T. Ferguson	Democratic	
1975–1995		Thomas E. Ferguson	Democratic	
1995–2003		Jim Petro	Republican	
2003–2007		Betty Montgomery	Republican	
2007–2011		Mary Taylor	Republican	
2011–2019		Dave Yost	Republican	
2019–		Keith Faber	Republican	Incumbent
