= Web notes =

Web note
- Country: United States
- Value: 1 $
- Years of printing: 1988,1993,1995
- Nature of rarity: Experimental press run
- Estimated value: US$2 – $1,300

Obverse
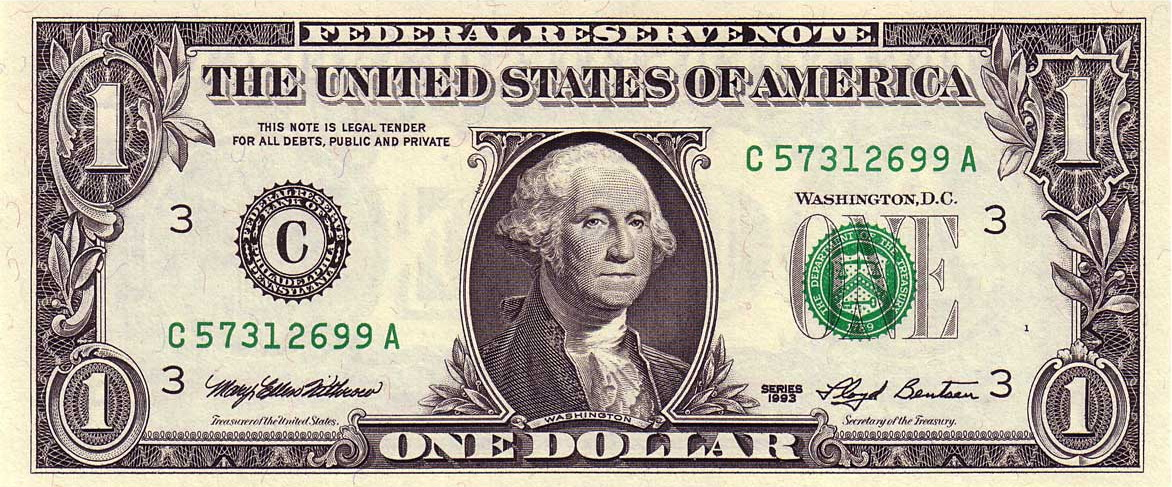

Web notes are a type of United States currency named after the "web printing production" method of printing on continuous rolls of paper. There are several types of web printing production methods, including offset, gravure (intaglio), flexography, etc. However high-pressure web intaglio printing, front, and back of the intaglio process was a new idea.

Between 1992 and 1996, the Bureau of Engraving and Printing experimented to see if a web press that used continuous rolls of paper was quicker and cheaper than intaglio printing, which uses flat sheets. The notes produced were dollar bills from Series 1988A, Series 1993 and Series 1995. As the press was in the Washington facility, no web notes were printed at the Fort Worth plant. They are legal tender and are not considered error notes, although they are somewhat scarce and more valuable than bills produced by the sheet-fed method.

== List of notes ==
The following is a list of web-printed notes and their serial number blocks:

1988A

- B..L 6 (part) Mixed run of web and regular May 1992
- F..* 3 (part) Mixed run of web and regular Jun 1992
- F 704 00001 L - F 768 00000 L Jul 1992
- F 832 00001 L - F 896 00000 L Jul 1992
- F 000 00001 M - F 064 00000 M Jul 1992
- F 576 00001 N - F 768 00000 N Sep 1992
- C 640 00001 A - C 768 00000 A Sep 1992
- A 256 00001 E - A 320 00000 E Nov 1992
- A 384 00001 E - A 448 00000 E Nov 1992
- A 576 00001 E - A 640 00000 E Nov 1992
- A 000 00001 F - A 128 00000 F Dec 1992
- E 448 00001 I - E 640 00000 I Feb 1993
- E 448 00001 K - E 640 00000 K Apr 1993
- A 832 00001 F - A 960 00000 F Jun 1993
- A 000 00001 G - A 192 00000 G Jun 1993
- G 448 00001 P - G 576 00000 P Jul 1993
- G 448 00001 Q - G 512 00000 Q Aug 1993
- F 512 00001 U - F 576 00000 U Oct 1993
- F 640 00001 U - F 704 00000 U Oct 1993
- F 896 00001 U - F 960 00000 U Oct 1993
- F 064 00001 V - F 128 00000 V Oct 1993
- F 192 00001 V - F 256 00000 V Oct 1993
- F 384 00001 V - F 448 00000 V Oct 1993
- F 576 00001 V - F 640 00000 V Oct 1993
- F 768 00001 V - F 832 00000 V Oct 1993
- F 896 00001 V - F 960 00000 V Oct 1993

1993

- B 192 00001 H - B 256 00000 H May 1995
- B 384 00001 H - B 448 00000 H May 1995
- C 384 00001 A - C 448 00000 A Jun 1995
- C 512 00001 A - C 576 00000 A Jun 1995

1995

- A 320 00001 C - A 448 00000 C Sep 1995
- D 640 00001 C - D 704 00000 C Nov 1995
- F 832 00001 D - F 960 00000 D Dec 1995
- B 320 00001 H - B 384 00000 H Apr 1996
- B 448 00001 H - B 512 00000 H Apr 1996
- A..D 13 (part) Mixed run of web and regular Jul 1996

== Intaglio web press versus intaglio sheetfed press ==
In May 1991, the Bureau of Engraving and Printing (BEP) installed a web press at the Washington, DC printing facilities to test a new way of printing $1 bills. BEP officials hoped that the test would replace the sheet-fed intaglio presses by switching to a possibly quicker and less expensive method of printing. The Alexander-Hamilton Web Currency Press was a true web currency press.

There are several differences between the two types of presses:

=== Intaglio (standard) ===
- Sheetfed. Sheets precut to size. (32 bills, 4 by 8, approx. 21.25 X 26 in)
- Intaglio prints three times, once on each side for front and back, and then once more for seals and serial numbers.
- 32 notes printed, in three stages
- Delivered over 8,000 sheets per hour.

=== Web press (experimental) ===
- Fed by a continuous paper roll
- Printed both sides of a note simultaneously
- Created 96 notes in one pass
- Delivered 10,000 sheets in 35 minutes
- Sheeted into 32 bills per sheet (21.25 X 26)

The continuous-roll printing process (Web offset) is visually very similar to the printing of newspapers, whereas intaglio visually resembles metal stamping manufacturing methods.

Problems arose with the web press. The main drawback was its inability to sustain long continuous runs compared to the standard (Giori) sheetfed method of intaglio printing, resulting in a constant breakdown. In addition, the quality of the prints was subpar compared to the established method. Due to these factors, the web press was discontinued in July 1996.

== Identifying web notes ==
A currency note that was printed on a web press (referred to as a web note) can be identified by two distinct characteristics.

The following images illustrate the differences. The top note in each image is a web note; the bottom note is sheetfed.

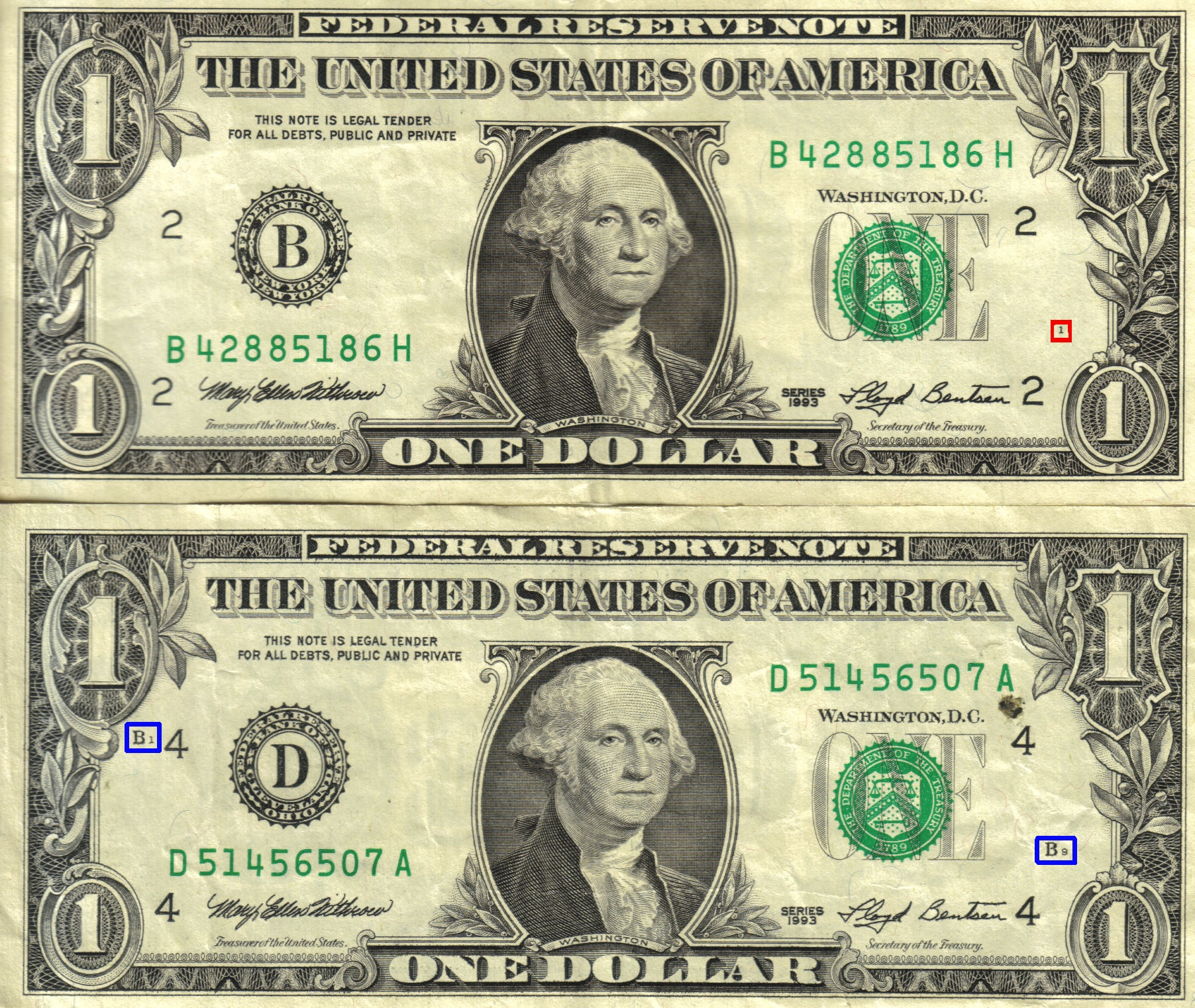

The red box indicates the faceplate number on a web note, which is near the bottom right corner, while blue boxes indicate the faceplate number, in the bottom right corner, and a position indicator number, in the upper left corner, on a sheet-fed note. Also, on sheetfed notes, the plate numbers are preceded by a letter.

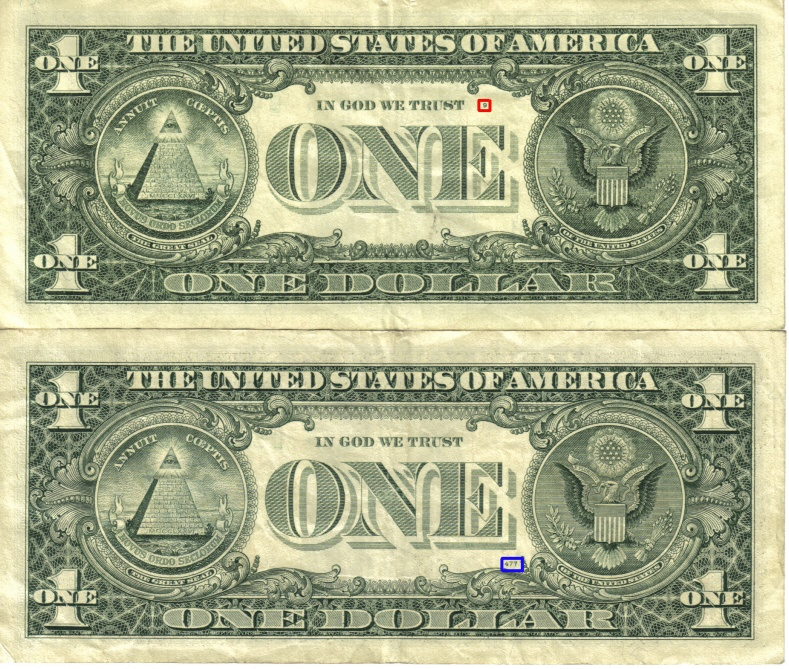

On the web note, the backplate number is just to the side of TRUST in the motto IN GOD WE TRUST (red box). On the sheetfed note, the backplate number is to the lower right corner of the central white space (blue box).

Web notes were made for three series of dollar bills.

Series	Treasurer of the United States	Secretary of the Treasury
1988A	Catalina Vasquez Villalpando	Nicholas F. Brady
1993	Mary Ellen Withrow	Lloyd Bentsen
1995	Mary Ellen Withrow	Robert Rubin

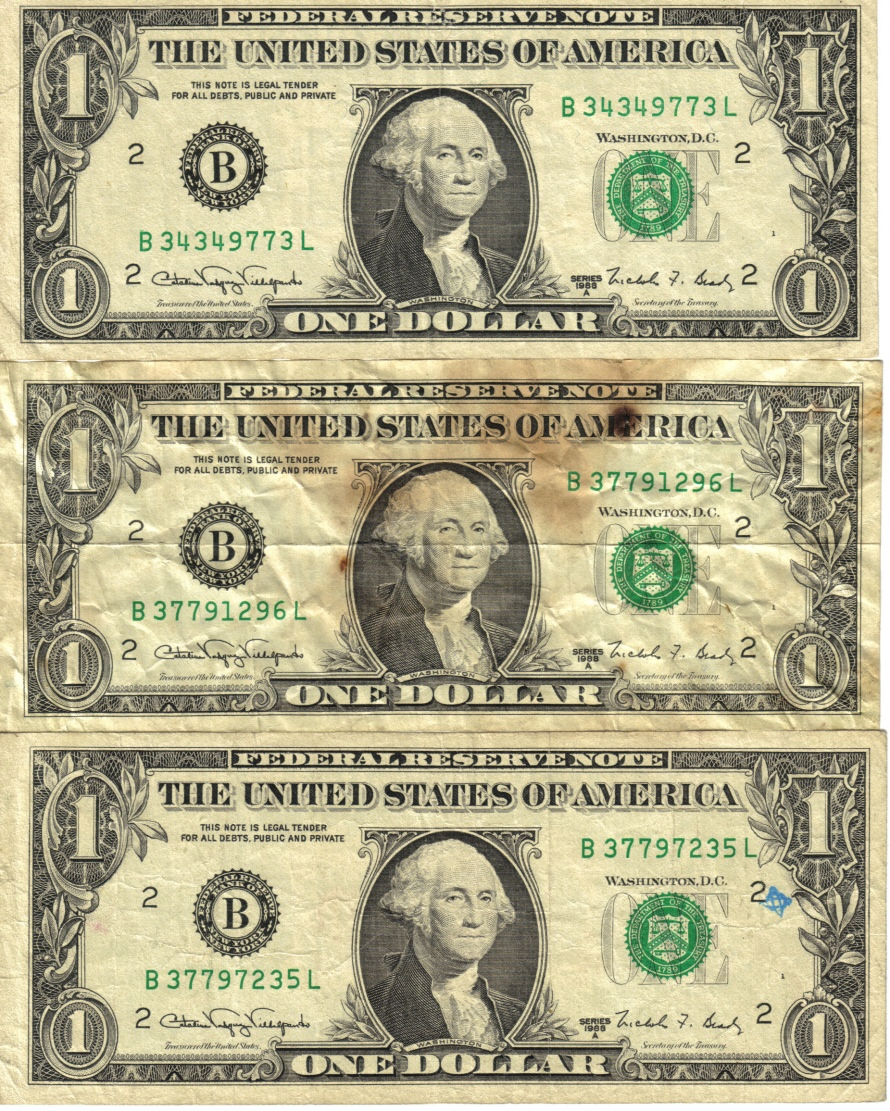
Several web notes from the Series 1988A B-L block showing varying signs of circulation.

== Key issues ==
Of the series, Series 1988A bills hold the two key issues (issues with the most collector value).

Notes of the New York FRB and the Atlanta FRB are the two keys. FRBNY used the B-L serial number block, while FRBA used a Star Note serial number block (F-*), with the specific serial numbers in place of the dash. While an accurate print run has never been disclosed by the BEP (as the figures were combined with the intaglio runs), estimates are 1,920,000 notes for the B-L serial number block for the FRBNY, and 640,000 for the F-* serial number block for FRBA.

FRBNY B-L notes can fetch from $300 for circulated examples, to $1,300 for uncirculated examples. FRBA F-* notes can fetch from $600 for circulated examples, to $1250 for uncirculated examples. 1988A notes from other districts, and later series, are considerably less valuable.
