= 1990 Ohio State Treasurer election =

- November 6, 1990
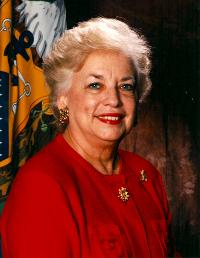

Nominee	Mary Ellen Withrow	Judith Y. Brachman
Party	Democratic	Republican
Popular vote	1,961,127	1,336,761
Percentage	59.47%	40.53%
- County results Withrow: 50–60% 60–70% 70–80% Brachman: 50–60%
Ohio State Treasurer before election
Mary Ellen Withrow
Democratic
Elected Ohio State Treasurer
Mary Ellen Withrow
Democratic

The 1990 Ohio State Treasurer election was held on November 6, 1990, to elect the Ohio State Treasurer. Primaries were held on May 8, 1990. Democratic incumbent Ohio State Treasurer Mary Ellen Withrow won re-election in a landslide, defeating Republican nominee Judith Y. Brachman by nearly 20 percentage points.

Withrow would not serve another full term as Ohio State Treasurer as she would go on to resign in 1994 after being nominated to the office of Treasurer of the United States.

== Democratic primary ==
=== Candidates ===
- Mary Ellen Withrow, incumbent Ohio State Treasurer (1983–1994)

=== Campaign ===
Withrow won renomination unopposed.

=== Results ===
Democratic primary results
Party	Candidate	Votes	%
Democratic	Mary Ellen Withrow	677,098	100.00%
Total votes		677,098	100.00%

== Republican primary ==
=== Candidates ===
- Judith Y. Brachman

=== Campaign ===
Brachman won the Republican nomination without opposition.

=== Results ===
Republican primary results
Party	Candidate	Votes	%
Republican	Judith Y. Brachman	217,456	100.00%
Total votes		217,456	100.00%

== General election ==
=== Candidates ===
- Mary Ellen Withrow, incumbent Ohio State Treasurer (1983–1994) (Democratic)
- Judith Y. Brachman (Republican)

=== Results ===
1990 Ohio State Treasurer election results
Party	Candidate	Votes	%	±%
Democratic	Mary Ellen Withrow	1,961,127	59.47%	+4.54%
Republican	Judith Y. Brachman	1,336,761	40.53%	−4.54%
Total votes		3,297,888	100.00%	
Democratic hold				
