= United States twenty-dollar bill =

Current denomination of United States currency

Twenty dollars
- Country: United States
- Value: $20
- Width: 156 mm
- Height: 66.3 mm
- Weight: c. 1.0 g
- Security features: Security fibers, watermark, security thread, color shifting ink, micro printing, raised printing, EURion constellation
- Material used: 75% cotton 25% linen
- Years of printing: 1861–present

Obverse
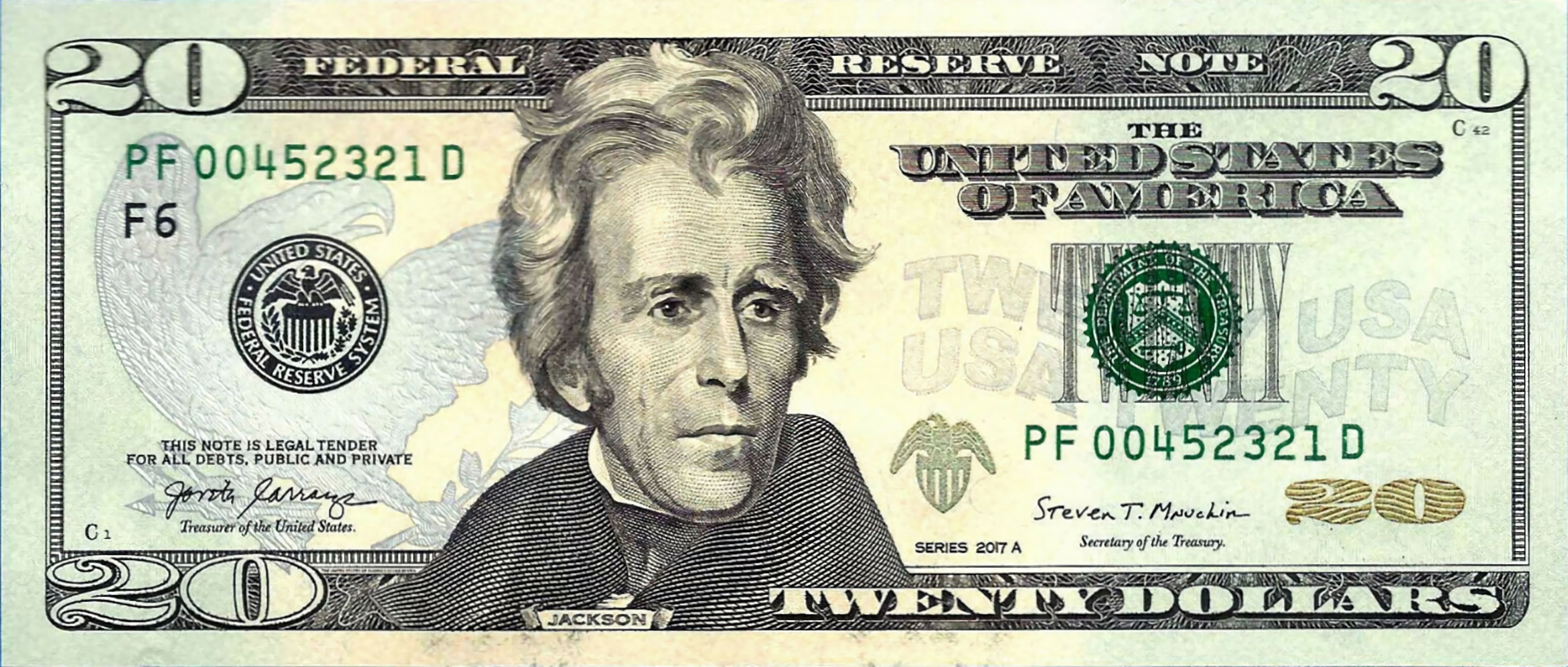
- Design: Andrew Jackson
- Design date: 2003

Reverse
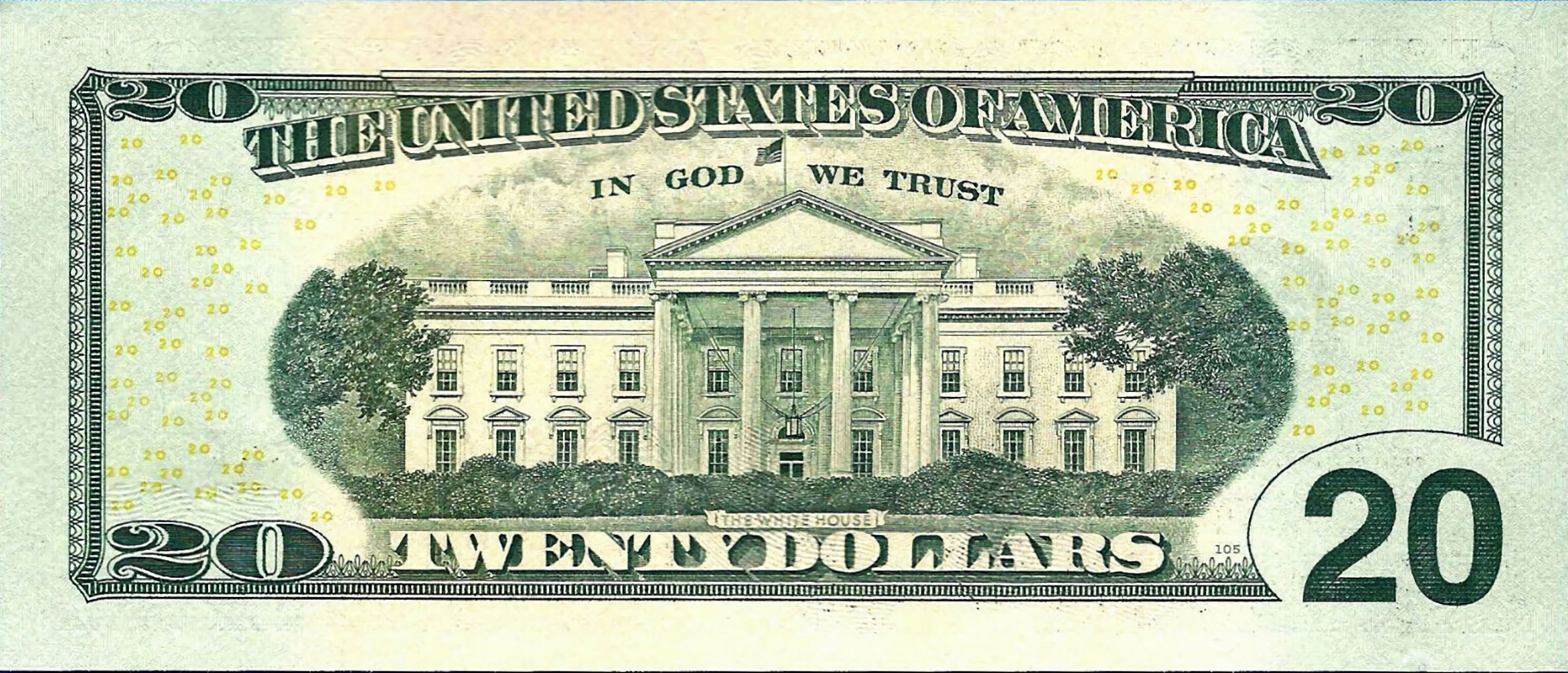
- Design: White House
- Design date: 2003

The United States twenty-dollar note (US$20), also referred to as the United States twenty-dollar bill, is a denomination of U.S. currency. A portrait of Andrew Jackson, the seventh U.S. president (1829–1837), has been featured on the obverse of the note since 1928; the White House is featured on the reverse.

As of December 2018, the average life of a $20 note in circulation is 7.8 years before it is replaced due to wear. Twenty-dollar notes are delivered by Federal Reserve Banks in violet straps.

== History ==
=== Large-sized notes ===
- 1861: A demand note with the Goddess of Liberty holding a sword and shield on the front, and an abstract design on the back. The back is printed green.
- 1862: A note that is very similar, the first $20 United States note. The back has several small variations.
- 1863: A gold certificate $20 note with an Eagle vignette on the face. The reverse has a $20 gold coin and various abstract elements. The back is orange.
- 1865: A national bank note with "The Battle of Lexington" and Pocahontas's marriage to John Rolfe in black, and a green border.
- 1869: A new United States note design, with Alexander Hamilton on the left side of the front and Victory holding a shield and sword. The back design is green.
- 1875: As above, except with a different reverse.
- 1878: A silver certificate $20 note with a portrait of Stephen Decatur on the right side of the face. The back design is black.
- 1882: A new gold certificate, with a portrait of James Garfield on the right of the face. The back is orange and features an eagle.
- 1882: A new national bank note. The front is similar, but the back is different and printed in brown.
- 1886: A new silver certificate $20 note, with Daniel Manning on the center of the face.
- 1890: A treasury (coin) note with John Marshall on the left of the face. Two different backs exist both with abstract designs.
- 1902: A new national bank note. The front features Hugh McCulloch, and the back has a vignette of an allegorical America.
- 1905: A new gold certificate $20 note, with George Washington on the center of the face. The back design is orange.
- 1914: A Federal Reserve Note.
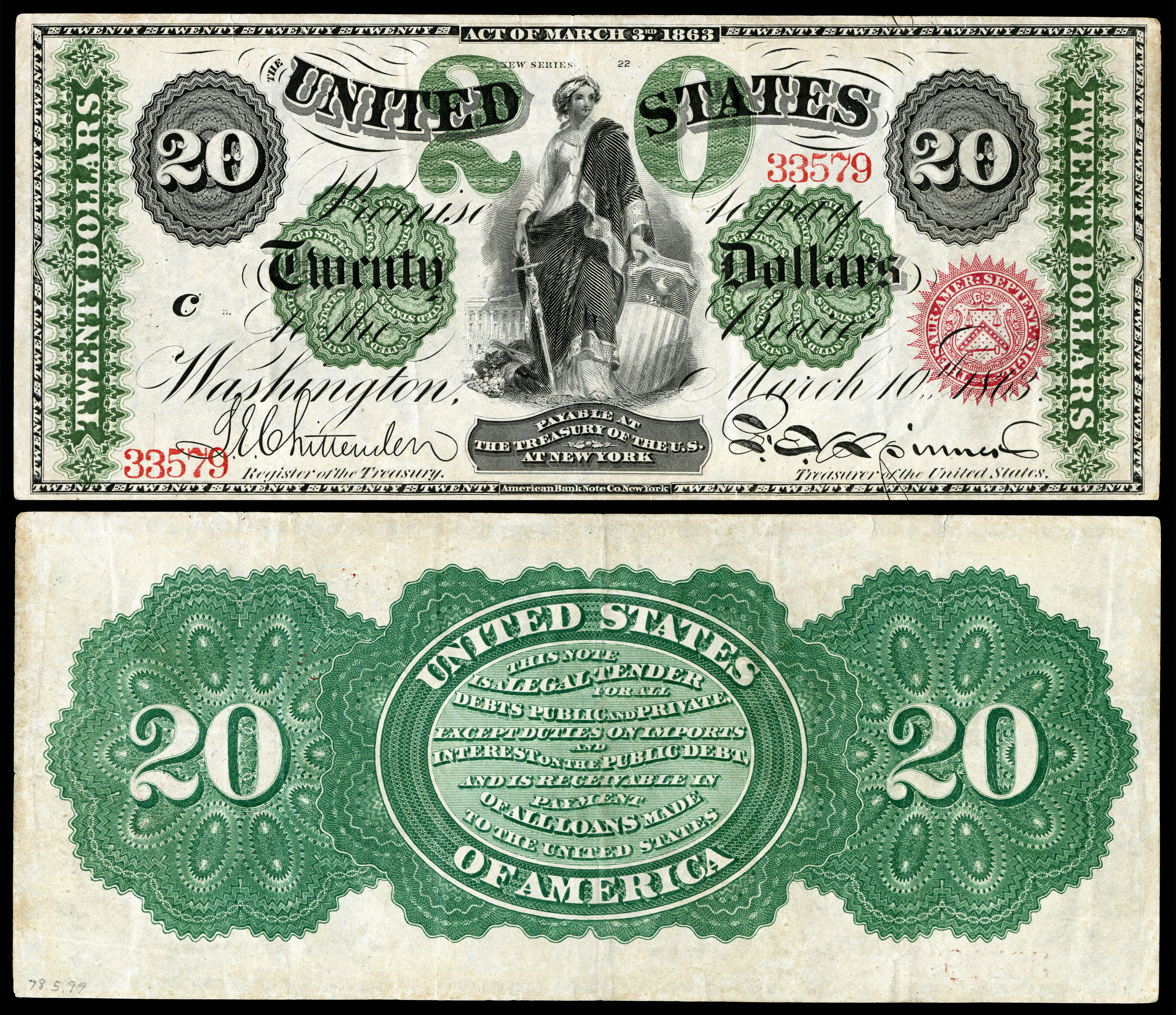
1863 $20 Legal Tender note

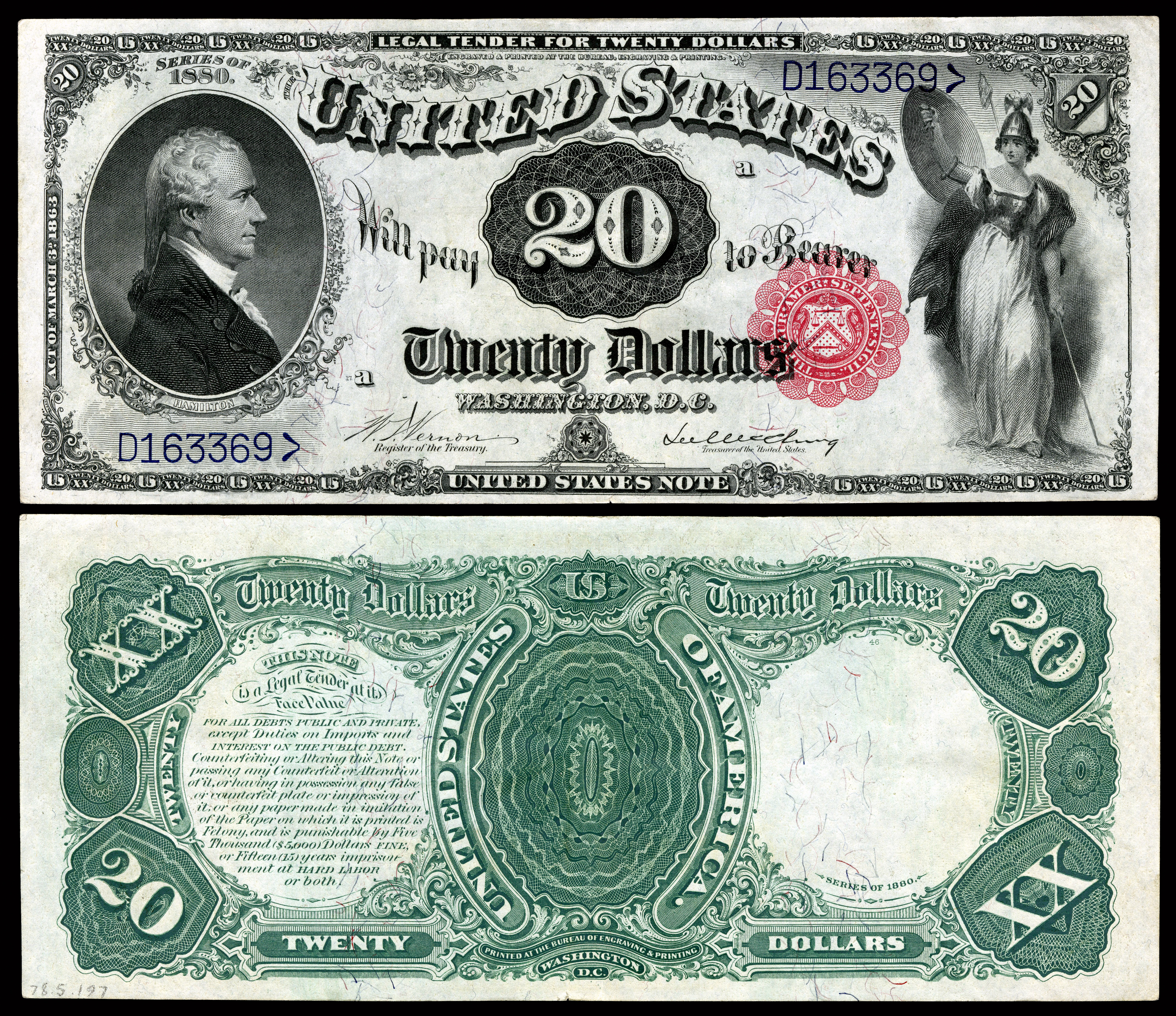
1880 $20 Legal Tender depicting Alexander Hamilton

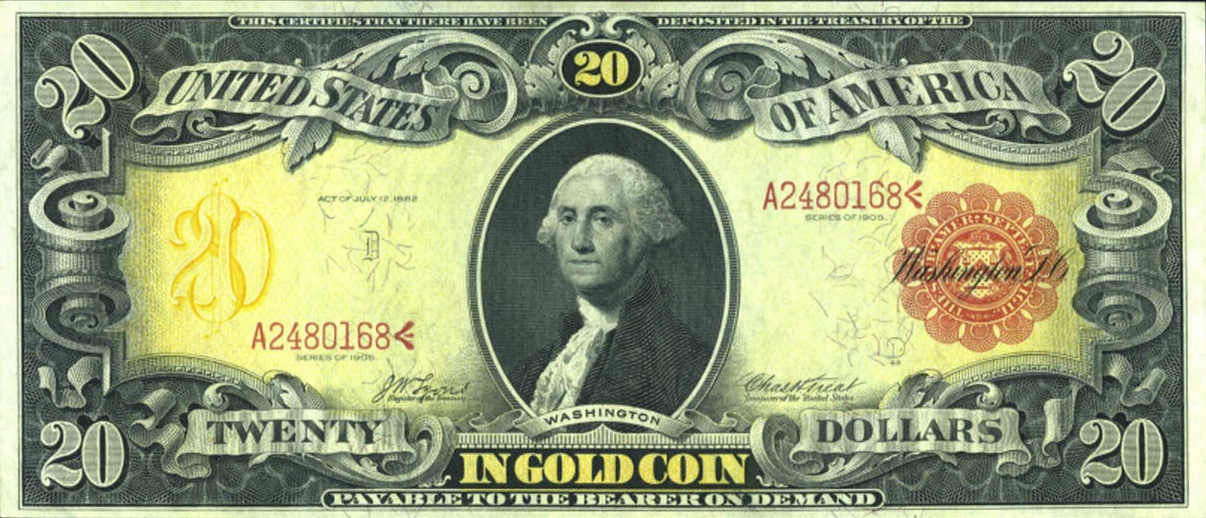
Series 1905 $20 gold certificate

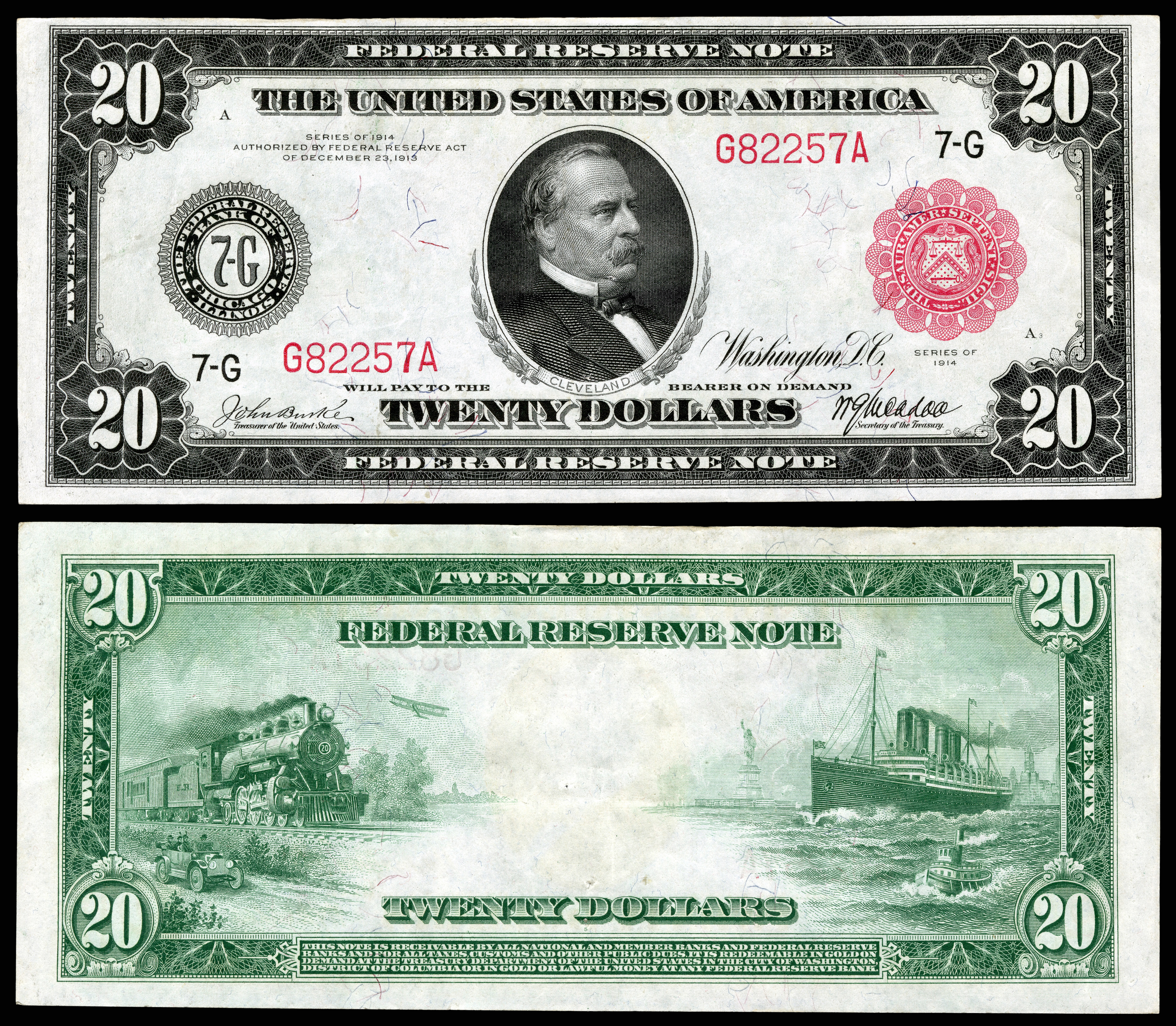
1914 $20 Federal Reserve Note

=== Small size notes ===
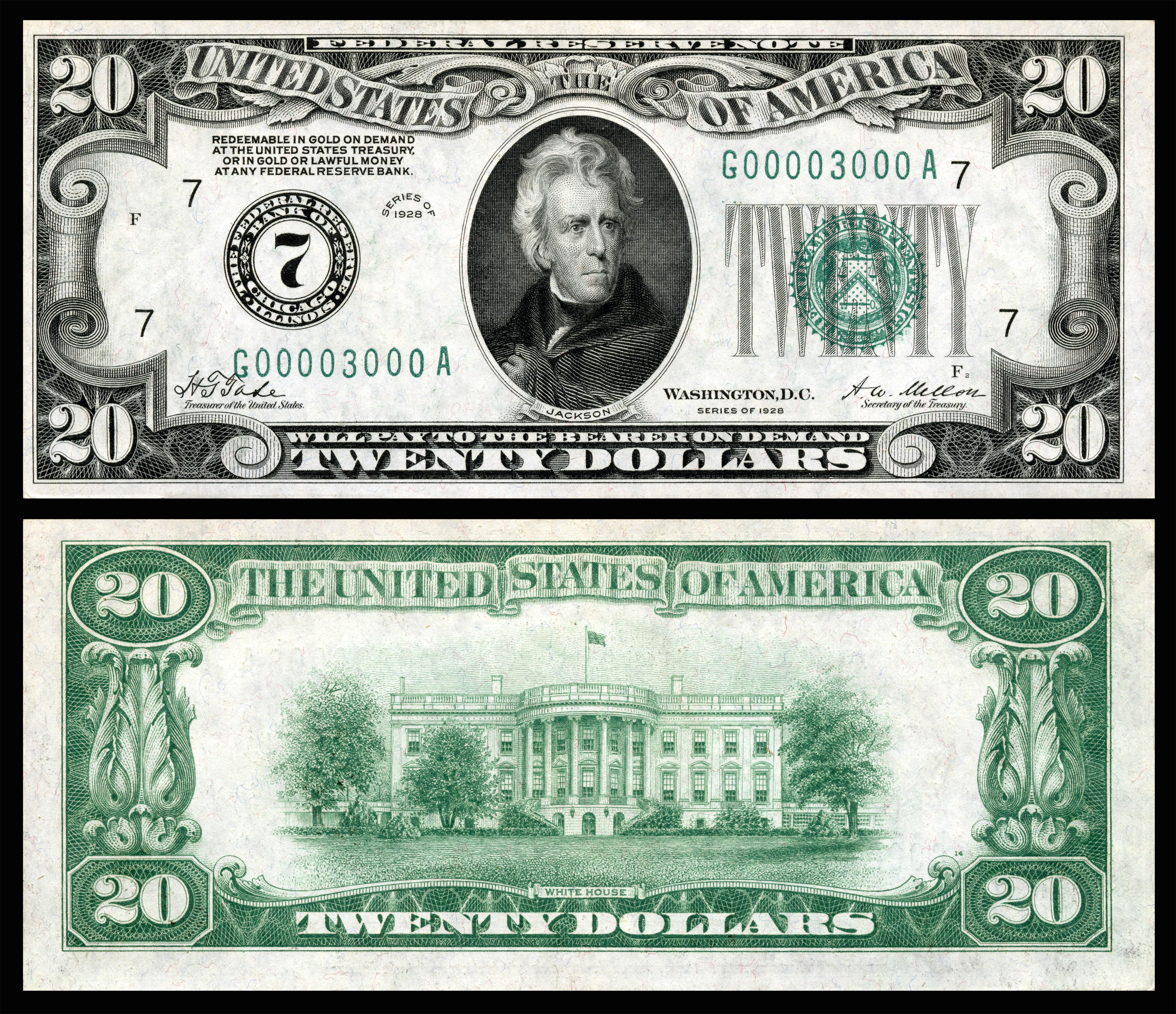
Series 1928 $20 small-size Federal Reserve Note.

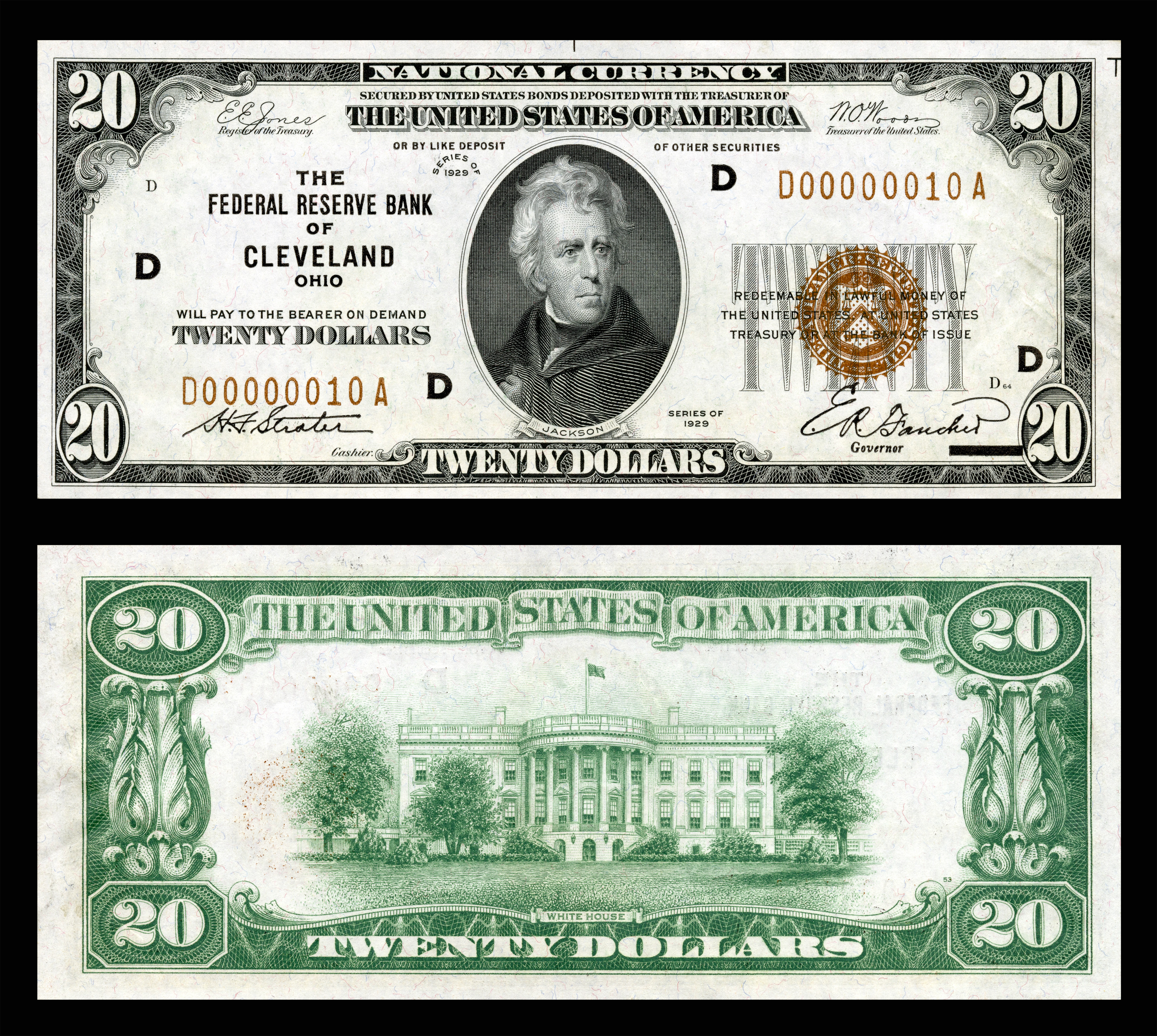
Series 1929 $20 National Currency note issued by the Cleveland Federal Reserve Bank.

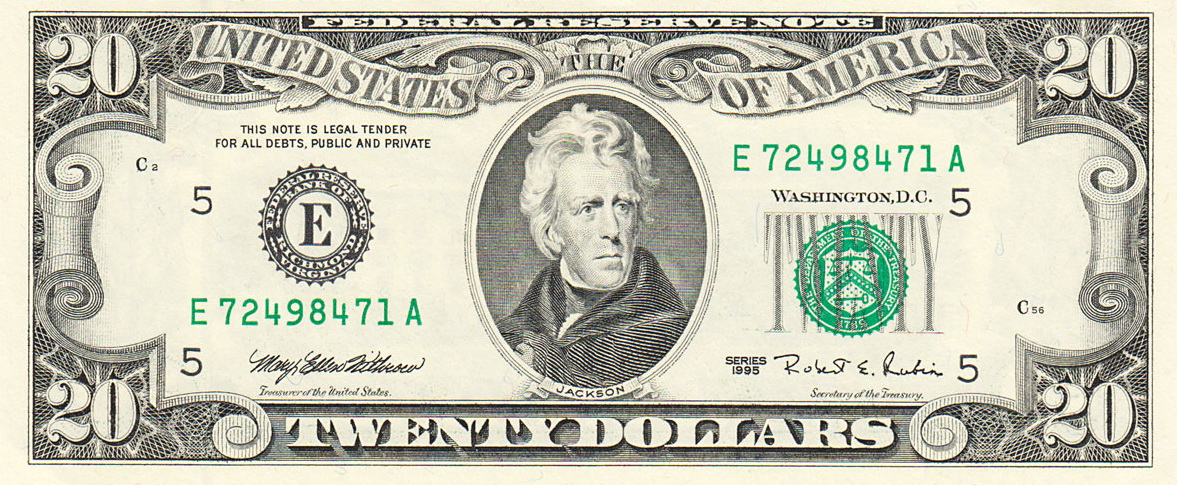
Series 1995 $20 Federal Reserve Note; basically unchanged since Series 1950

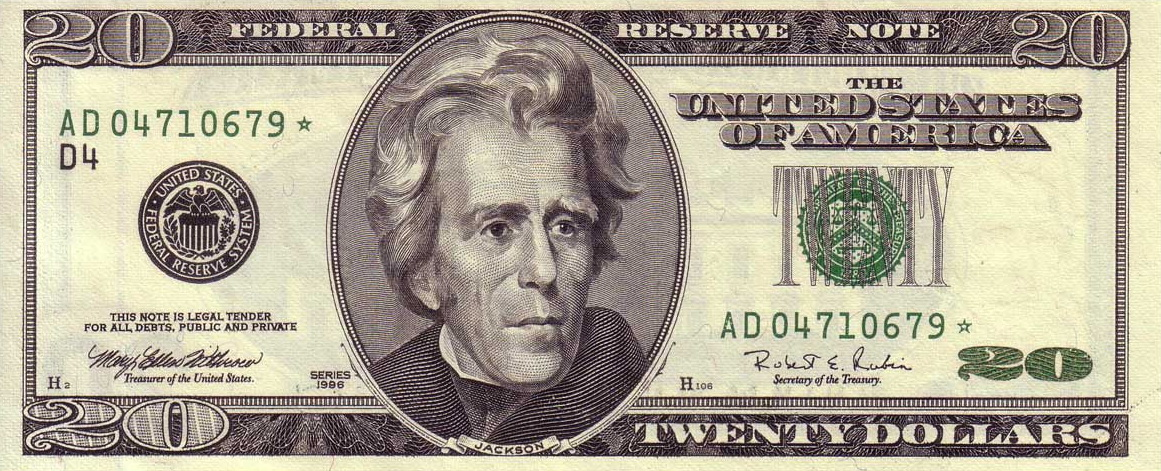
Series 1996 $20 Federal Reserve Note.

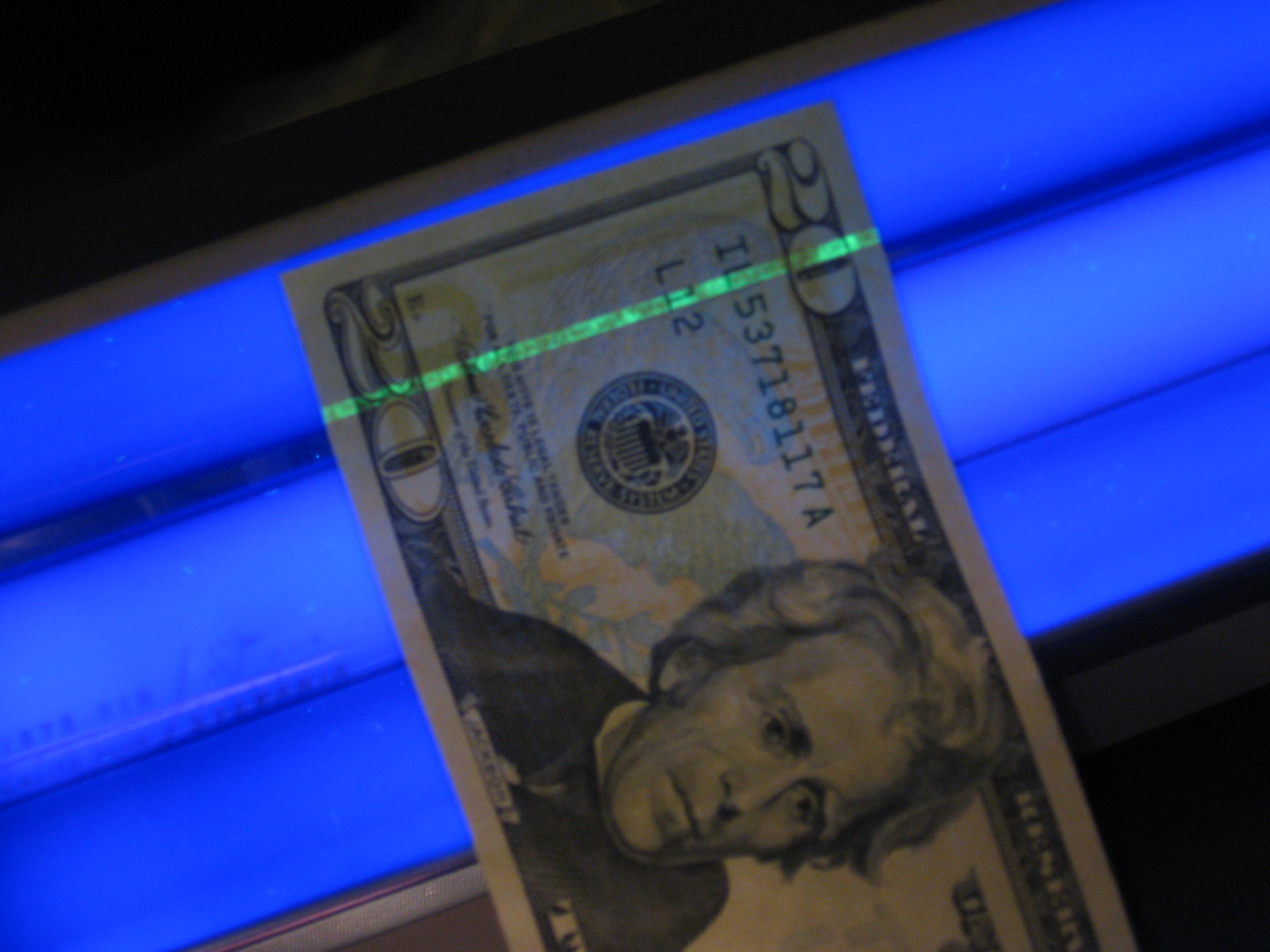
The security strip in a twenty-dollar note glows green under a blacklight.

Andrew Jackson has appeared on the $20 note since the series of 1928. The placement of Jackson on the $20 note is considered ironic; as president, he vehemently opposed both the National Bank and use of paper money. After the president of the Second Bank of the United States, Nicholas Biddle, defied Jackson and requested the renewal of the charter of the Second Bank in an election year, Jackson responded by making it a goal of his administration to destroy the National Bank. Jackson prevailed over Biddle, and the absence of the Second Bank contributed to a real estate bubble in the mid-1830s. The bubble collapsed in the Panic of 1837, leading to a deep depression.

Given Jackson's opposition to the concept of a National Bank, his presence on the $20 note was controversial from the start. When pressed to reveal why the various images were chosen for the new notes, Treasury officials denied there was any political motivation. Instead, they insisted that the images were based only on their relative familiarity to the public. An article in the June 30, 1929 issue of the New York Times, stated "The Treasury Department maintains stoutly that the men chosen for small notes, which are naturally the ones in most demand, were so placed because their faces were most familiar to the majority of people." It is also true that 1928 coincides with the 100th anniversary of Jackson's election as president, but no evidence has surfaced that would suggest that this was a factor in the decision. According to more recent inquiries of the U.S. Treasury: "Treasury Department records do not reveal the reason that portraits of these particular statesmen were chosen in preference to those of other persons of equal importance and prominence."

- 1914: Began as a large-sized note, a portrait of Grover Cleveland on the face, and, on the back, a steam locomotive and an automobile approaching from the left, and a steamship approaching from the right.
- 1918: A federal reserve banknote with Grover Cleveland on the front, and a back design similar to the 1914 Federal Reserve Note.
- 1928: Switched to a small-sized note with a portrait of Andrew Jackson on the face and the south view of the White House on the reverse. The banknote is redeemable in gold or silver (at the bearer's discretion) at any Federal Reserve Bank.
- 1933: With the U.S. having abandoned the gold standard, the note is no longer redeemable in gold, but rather in "lawful money", meaning silver.
- 1942: A special emergency series, with brown serial numbers and "HAWAII" overprinted on both the front and the back, is issued. These notes were designed to circulate on the Hawaiian islands and could be rendered worthless in the event of a Japanese invasion.
- 1948: The White House rendering on the reverse of the note was updated to reflect renovations to the building itself, including the addition of the Truman Balcony, as well as the passage of time. Most notably, the trees are larger. The change occurred during production of Series 1934C.
- 1950: Design elements such as the treasury and Federal Reserve seals are reduced in size and repositioned subtly, presumably for aesthetic reasons.
- 1963: "Will Pay To The Bearer On Demand" is removed from the front of the note and the legal tender designation is shortened to "This note is legal tender for all debts, public and private" (eliminating "and is redeemable in lawful money at the United States Treasury, or at any Federal Reserve Bank.") Also, IN GOD WE TRUST is added above the White House on the reverse. These two acts (one taking U.S. currency off the silver backing, and the other authorizing the national motto) are coincidental, even if their combined result is implemented in one redesign. Also, several design elements are rearranged, less perceptibly than the changes in 1950, mostly to make room for the slightly rearranged obligations.
- 1969: The new treasury seal appears on all denominations, including the $20 note.
- 1977: A new type of serial-number press results in a slightly different font. The old presses are gradually retired, and old-style serial numbers appear as late as 1981 for this denomination.
- 1992: For Series 1990, new anti-counterfeiting features are added: microprinting around the portrait, and a plastic strip embedded in the paper. Production of Series 1990 notes began in April 1992.
- 1994: The first $20 notes produced at the Western Currency Facility in Fort Worth, Texas are printed in January 1994, late during production of Series 1990.
- 1998: The Series 1996 $20 note was completely redesigned for the first time since 1929 to further deter counterfeiting; A larger, off-center portrait of Jackson was used and the view of the White House on the reverse of the note was changed from the south portico to the north. Several new anti-counterfeiting features were added, including color-shifting ink, microprinting, and a watermark. The plastic strip now reads "USA 20" and glows green under a black light. Production of Series 1996 $20 notes began in June 1998.
- 2003: The redesigned Series 2004 20 dollar note is released with light background shading in green and yellow, and no oval around Andrew Jackson's portrait (background images of eagles, etc. were also added to the obverse); the reverse features the same view of the White House, but without an oval around it. Ninety faint "20"s are scattered on the back in yellow à la the "EURion constellation" to prevent photocopying. Production of Series 2004 $20 notes began in April 2003.

=== Series dates ===
==== Small size ====
Type	Series	Register	Treasurer	Seal
National Bank Note Types 1 & 2	1929	Jones	Woods	Brown
Federal Reserve Bank Note	1928A	Jones	Woods	Brown

Type	Series	Treasurer	Secretary	Seal
Gold Certificate	1928	Woods	Mellon	Gold
Federal Reserve Note	1928	Tate	Mellon	Green
Federal Reserve Note	1928A	Woods	Mellon	Green
Federal Reserve Note	1928B	Woods	Mellon	Green
Federal Reserve Note	1928C	Woods	Mills	Green
Federal Reserve Note	1934	Julian	Morgenthau	Green
Federal Reserve Note	1934 Hawaii	Julian	Morgenthau	Brown
Federal Reserve Note	1934A	Julian	Morgenthau	Green
Federal Reserve Note	1934A Hawaii	Julian	Morgenthau	Brown
Federal Reserve Note	1934B	Julian	Vinson	Green
Federal Reserve Note	1934C	Julian	Snyder	Green
Federal Reserve Note	1934D	Clark	Snyder	Green
Federal Reserve Note	1950	Clark	Snyder	Green
Federal Reserve Note	1950A	Priest	Humphrey	Green
Federal Reserve Note	1950B	Priest	Anderson	Green
Federal Reserve Note	1950C	Smith	Dillon	Green
Federal Reserve Note	1950D	Granahan	Dillon	Green
Federal Reserve Note	1950E	Granahan	Fowler	Green
Federal Reserve Note	1963	Granahan	Dillon	Green
Federal Reserve Note	1963A	Granahan	Fowler	Green
Federal Reserve Note	1969	Elston	Kennedy	Green
Federal Reserve Note	1969A	Kabis	Connally	Green
Federal Reserve Note	1969B	Bañuelos	Connally	Green
Federal Reserve Note	1969C	Bañuelos	Shultz	Green
Federal Reserve Note	1974	Neff	Simon	Green
Federal Reserve Note	1977	Morton	Blumenthal	Green
Federal Reserve Note	1981	Buchanan	Regan	Green
Federal Reserve Note	1981A	Ortega	Regan	Green
Federal Reserve Note	1985	Ortega	Baker	Green
Federal Reserve Note	1988A	Villalpando	Brady	Green
Federal Reserve Note	1990	Villalpando	Brady	Green
Federal Reserve Note	1993	Withrow	Bentsen	Green
Federal Reserve Note	1995	Withrow	Rubin	Green
Federal Reserve Note	1996	Withrow	Rubin	Green
Federal Reserve Note	1999	Withrow	Summers	Green
Federal Reserve Note	2001	Marin	O'Neill	Green
Federal Reserve Note	2004	Marin	Snow	Green
Federal Reserve Note	2004A	Cabral	Snow	Green
Federal Reserve Note	2006	Cabral	Paulson	Green
Federal Reserve Note	2009	Rios	Geithner	Green
Federal Reserve Note	2013	Rios	Lew	Green
Federal Reserve Note	2017	Carranza	Mnuchin	Green
Federal Reserve Note	2017A	Carranza	Mnuchin	Green
Federal Reserve Note	2021	Malerba	Yellen	Green

== Proposed redesigns of the 20 dollar note ==
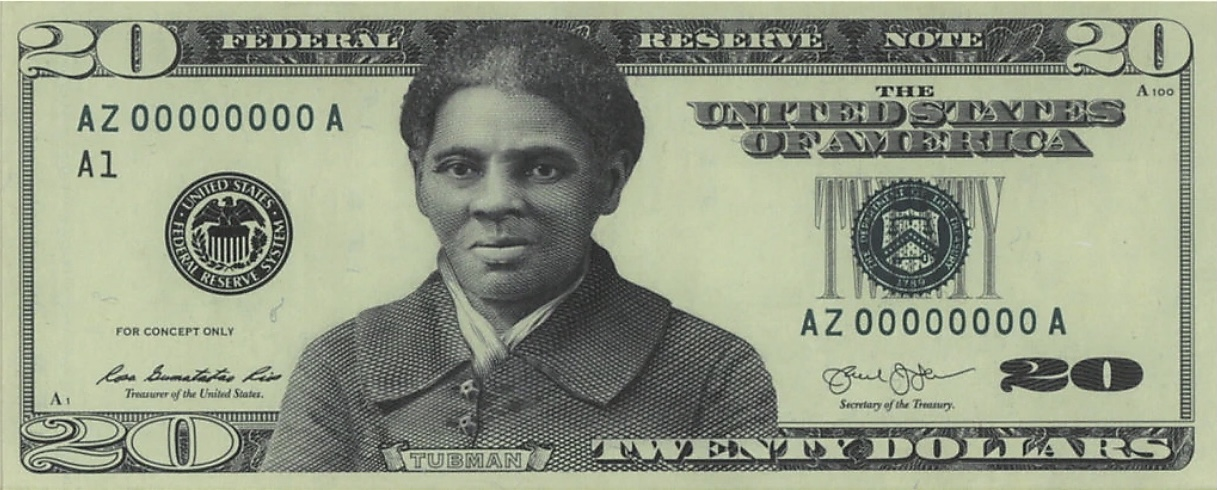
Official $20 note prototype featuring Harriet Tubman

In a campaign called "Women on 20s", selected voters were asked to choose three of 15 female candidates to have a portrait on the $20 note. The goal was to have a woman on the $20 note by 2020, the centennial of the 19th Amendment which gave women the right to vote. Among the candidates on the petition were Harriet Tubman, Eleanor Roosevelt, Rosa Parks, and Wilma Mankiller, the first female chief of the Cherokee Nation.

On May 12, 2015, Tubman was announced as the winning candidate of that "grassroots" poll with more than 600,000 people surveyed and more than 118,000 choosing Tubman, followed by Roosevelt, Parks and Mankiller.

On June 17, 2015, Treasury Secretary Jack Lew announced that a woman's portrait would be featured on a redesigned $10 note by 2020, replacing Alexander Hamilton. However, that decision was reversed, at least in part due to Hamilton's surging popularity following the hit Broadway musical Hamilton.

On April 20, 2016, Lew officially announced that Alexander Hamilton would remain on the $10 note, while Andrew Jackson would be replaced by Tubman on the front of the $20 note, with Jackson appearing on the reverse. Lew simultaneously announced that the five- and ten-dollar notes would also be redesigned in the coming years and put into production in the next decade. However, as the $20 note was not scheduled to be replaced until after the $10 note, this moved the production date of the referenced note containing Tubman back, frustrating supporters of placing a woman on a note. Secretary Lew reiterated that the $10 note would be redesigned first.

=== First Trump administration ===
While campaigning for president, Donald Trump responded to the announcement that Tubman would replace Jackson on the twenty-dollar note. The day following the announcement Trump called Tubman "fantastic", but stated that he would oppose replacing Jackson with Tubman, calling the replacement "pure political correctness", and suggested that Tubman could perhaps be put on another denomination instead.

On August 31, 2017, Treasury Secretary Steven Mnuchin said that he would not commit to putting Tubman on the twenty-dollar note, explaining "People have been on the notes for a long period of time. This is something we'll consider; right now we have a lot more important issues to focus on." According to a Bureau of Engraving and Printing (BEP) spokesperson, the next redesigned note will be the ten-dollar note, not set to be released into circulation until at least 2026.

In May 2019, Mnuchin stated that no new imagery for the new 2028 $20 note would be unveiled until 2026. He also reaffirmed that the new $20 note would not be moved up ahead of the new $10 or $50 notes due to counterfeiting security concerns regarding the $10 and $50 notes. Mnuchin would not say whether he supported keeping Tubman on the redesigned $20 note. He said that the decision will be left to whomever is Treasury secretary in 2026. Democratic members of the House of Representatives asked Mnuchin to provide more specific reasons for the design release delay. The production date of the new $20 note, 2028, was unchanged from the timeline announced in 2016 by the Obama administration. The Director of the BEP, Len Olijar, released a statement saying that the "BEP was never going to unveil a note design in 2020" and that the illustration used by the New York Times was not a new $20 note. Later in June, the Treasury Department's acting inspector general, Rich Delmar, sent a letter to Senate Majority Leader Chuck Schumer stating that his office would investigate the issue.

In June 2020, the Office of Inspector General released a report detailing the results of its investigation, which concluded that the $20 note's position in the redesign sequence had not changed, that the earlier announcement of the 2020 date by the Obama administration "was made outside of the note development governance structure and without the recommendation of the ACD" (referring to the Advanced Counterfeit Deterrence Steering Committee), that the $10 note redesign set to precede the $20 redesign had already been delayed to no earlier than 2026 by 2016, and that the $20 note had not yet entered the banknote design process and was not expected to be production-ready until 2030.

=== Biden administration ===
In January 2021, White House Press Secretary Jen Psaki claimed President Joe Biden would accelerate the Tubman redesign. However, a 2022 internal department message from the Treasury Secretary, Janet Yellen, reaffirmed the 2030 debut originally planned by the Trump Administration.

=== Second Trump administration ===
In July 2026, Treasury Secretary Scott Bessent stated in an interview that the placement of Tubman's portrait on the $20 note is no longer planned.

== See also ==
- Twenty Bucks, a 1993 movie that follows the travels of a $20 note.

== Sources ==
- Abernethy, Thomas Perkins (October 1927). "Andrew Jackson and the Rise of South-Western Democracy". The American Historical Review. 33 (1). American Historical Association. Oxford University Press: 64–77. doi:10.2307/1838111. ISSN 0002-8762. JSTOR 1838111.
- Bancroft, Frederic (2023) [1931, 1996]. Slave Trading in the Old South (Original publisher: J. H. Fürst Co., Baltimore). Southern Classics Series. Introduction by Michael Tadman (Reprint ed.). Columbia, South Carolina: University of South Carolina Press. ISBN 978-1-6433-6427-8. LCCN 95020493. OCLC 1153619151.
- Goodstein, Anita Shafer (1989). Nashville, 1780–1860: From Frontier to City. Gainesville, Florida: University of Florida Press. ISBN 978-0-8130-0940-7. LCCN 89033186. OCLC 19669897.
