= Blind bill folding =

Folding of dollar bills by the blind to be identified by feel

In the United States, some blind or otherwise visually-impaired people fold dollar bills in specific ways so that they can identify the denominations of the bills by feel. Though some people have their own idiosyncratic systems, there is a method recommended by the American Foundation for the Blind:

- Leave $1 bills unfolded.
- Fold $5 bills lengthwise.
- Fold $10 bills by width.
- Fold $20 bills lengthwise and then by width. Or you can fold them just lengthwise and put them in a separate section of your wallet.

Unlike the banknotes of most countries, all denominations of United States paper money are the same size, preventing the visually impaired from identifying bills by feel. This alleged lack of access for the blind led to a 2002 court case, American Council of the Blind v. Paulson. In 2006, U.S. District Judge James Robertson ruled that the American bills gave an undue burden to the blind and denied them "meaningful access" to the U.S. currency system. Robertson accepted the plaintiff's argument that current practice violates Section 504 of the 1973 Rehabilitation Act. As a result of the court's injunction, the Bureau of Engraving and Printing is planning to implement a raised tactile feature in the next redesign of each note, except the $1 (which it is by law not allowed to redesign).
