= Federal Reserve Note =

Banknotes of the United States dollar

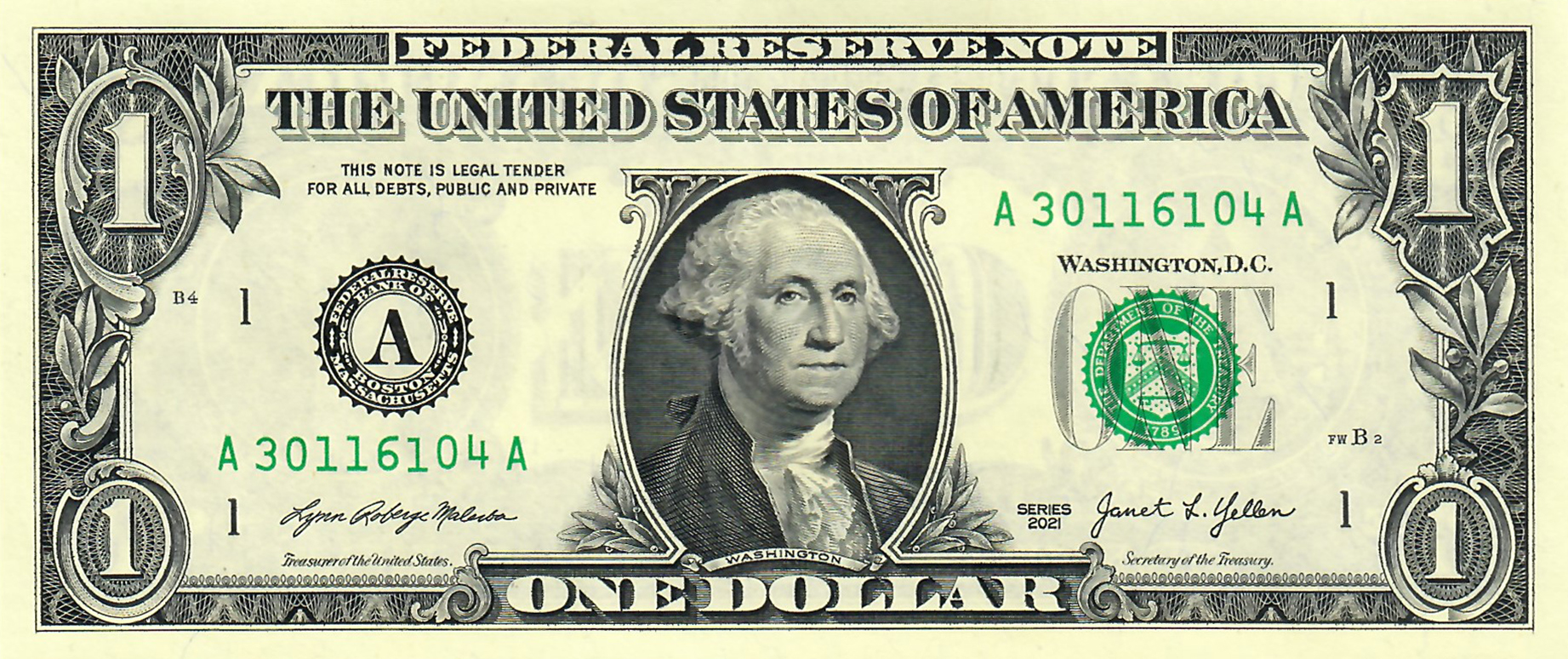
A one-dollar bill, the most common Federal Reserve Note, with a portrait of George Washington

Federal Reserve Notes are the currently issued banknotes of the United States dollar. The United States Bureau of Engraving and Printing, within the Department of the Treasury, produces the notes under the authority of the Federal Reserve Act of 1913 and issues them to the Federal Reserve Banks at the discretion of the Board of Governors of the Federal Reserve System. The Reserve Banks then circulate the notes to their member banks, at which point they become liabilities of the Reserve Banks and obligations of the United States.

Federal Reserve Notes are legal tender, with the words "this note is legal tender for all debts, public and private" printed on each note. The notes are backed by financial assets that the Federal Reserve Banks pledge as collateral, which are mainly Treasury securities and mortgage agency securities that they purchase on the open market by fiat payment.

== History ==
Following the enactment of the Constitution, states began chartering commercial banks that issued their own notes. These notes were known as state bank notes. The first institution to issue notes with national acceptance in the U.S. was the nationally chartered First Bank of the United States, chartered in 1791 by Alexander Hamilton. Its charter was not renewed in 1811. In 1816, the Second Bank of the United States was chartered and its notes also acquired widespread acceptance; its charter was not renewed in 1836, after President Andrew Jackson campaigned heavily for its disestablishment. From 1837 to 1863, in the Free Banking Era, state bank notes were the only circulating paper currency again. From 1863 to 1913, a system of national banks was instituted by the 1863 National Banking Act. Banks authorized under this act were known as National Banks and issued their own National Bank Notes. These did achieve national acceptance but the U.S. still lacked a central bank. It wasn't until the passage of the Federal Reserve Act that the United States finally had an institution that issued nationally accepted bank notes and had the powers of a central bank.

United States Note size change from large (gray) to small (green) with plate position letters. Modern Federal Reserve Note (blue) super-imposed on bottom left 1928-size note.

Federal Reserve Notes have been printed from Series 1914 in large-note format, and from Series 1928 in modern-day (small-note) format. The latter dimensions originated from the size of the Philippine peso Silver Certificates issued in 1903 while William Howard Taft served as Philippine governor-general under the United States colonial administration. In view of its highly successful run, President Taft subsequently appointed a committee that reported favorably on the advantages and savings from adopting the dimensions of Philippine notes for use in the United States. Final implementation of today's small-size format, however, only occurred in 1928.

== Value ==
The authority of the Federal Reserve Banks to issue notes comes from the Federal Reserve Act of 1913. Legally, they are liabilities of the Federal Reserve Banks and obligations of the United States government. Although not issued by the United States Treasury, Federal Reserve Notes carry the (engraved) signature of the Treasurer of the United States and the United States Secretary of the Treasury.

At the time of the Federal Reserve's creation, the law provided for notes to be redeemed to the Treasury in gold or "lawful money." The latter category was not explicitly defined, but included United States Notes, National Bank Notes, and certain other notes held by banks to meet reserve requirements, such as clearing certificates. The Emergency Banking Act of 1933 removed the gold obligation and authorized the Treasury to satisfy these redemption demands with current notes of equal face value (effectively making change). Under the Bretton Woods system, although citizens could not legally possess gold (except as rare coins, jewelry, for industrial purposes, etc.), the federal government continued to maintain a stable international gold price. This system ended with the Nixon Shock of 1971. Present-day Federal Reserve Notes are not backed by convertibility to any specific commodity, but only by the collateral assets that Federal Reserve Banks post in order to obtain them.

== Production and distribution ==
A commercial bank that maintains a reserve account with the Federal Reserve can obtain notes from the Federal Reserve Bank in its district whenever it wishes. The bank must pay the face value of the notes by debiting (drawing down) its reserve account. Smaller banks without a reserve account at the Federal Reserve can maintain their reserve accounts at larger "correspondent banks" which themselves maintain reserve accounts with the Federal Reserve.

Federal Reserve Notes are printed by the Bureau of Engraving and Printing (BEP), a bureau of the Department of the Treasury. When Federal Reserve Banks require additional notes for circulation, they must post collateral in the form of direct federal obligations, private bank obligations, or assets purchased through open market operations. If the notes are newly printed, they also pay the BEP for the cost of printing (about 4¢ per note). This differs from the issue of coins, which are purchased for their face value.

A Federal Reserve Bank can retire notes that return from circulation, which entitles it to recover collateral that it posted for an earlier issue. Retired notes in good condition are held in the bank's vault for future issues. Notes in poor condition are destroyed and replacements are ordered from the BEP. The Federal Reserve shreds 7,000 tons of worn out currency each year.

As of 2018, Federal Reserve notes remain, on average, in circulation for the following periods of time:

Denomination	$1	$2	$5	$10	$20	$50	$100
Years in circulation	6.6	no data	4.7	5.3	7.8	12.2	22.9

The Federal Reserve does not publish an average life span for the $2 bill. This is likely due to its treatment as a collector's item by the general public; it is, therefore, not subjected to normal circulation.

Starting with the Series 1996 $100 note, bills $5 and above have a special letter in addition to the prefix letters which range from A to Q. The first letter is A for Series 1996, B for Series 1999, C for Series 2001, D for Series 2003, F for Series 2003A, H for Series 2006, K for Series 2006A, J for Series 2009, M for Series 2013, N for Series 2017, P for Series 2017A, and Q for series 2021.

The Series 2004 $20, the first note in the second redesign, has kept the element of the special double prefix. The first letter is E for Series 2004, G for Series 2004A, I for Series 2006, J for Series 2009, L for Series 2009A, and M for Series 2013.

Federal Reserve Notes are made of 75% cotton and 25% linen fibers, supplied by Crane Currency of Dalton, Massachusetts specifically for that purpose.

== Nicknames ==
U.S. paper currency has had many nicknames and slang terms. The notes themselves are generally referred to as bills (as in "five-dollar bill"). Notes can be referred to by the first or last name of the person on the portrait (George for one dollar, or even more popularly, "Benjamins" for $100 notes).

- Greenbacks, any amount in any denomination of Federal Reserve Note (from the green ink used on the back). The Demand Notes issued in 1861 had green-inked backs, and the Federal Reserve Note of 1914 copied this pattern.
- Buck for a one-dollar bill.
- Fin is a slang term for a five-dollar bill, from Yiddish "finf" meaning five.
- Sawbuck is a slang term for a ten-dollar bill, from the image of the Roman numeral X and its resemblance to the carpentry implement.
- Double sawbuck is slang term for a twenty-dollar bill, from the image of the Roman numeral XX.
- One hundred dollar bills are sometimes called "Benjamins" (in reference to their portrait of Benjamin Franklin) or C-notes (the letter "C" is the Roman numeral 100).
- Dead presidents, referring to the portraits that feature on the front of each bill. (This colloquialism is partially incorrect; neither Alexander Hamilton nor Benjamin Franklin, who appear on the ten-dollar and one hundred-dollar bills respectively, ever served as president of the United States.)

== Criticisms ==
=== Security ===
Despite the relatively late addition of color and other anti-counterfeiting features to U.S. currency, critics hold that it is still a straightforward matter to counterfeit these bills. They point out that the ability to reproduce color images is well within the capabilities of modern color printers, most of which are affordable to many consumers. These critics suggest that the Federal Reserve should incorporate holographic features, as are used in most other major currencies, such as the pound sterling, Canadian dollar and euro banknotes, which are more difficult and expensive to forge. Another robust technology, the polymer banknote, was developed for the Australian dollar and adopted for the New Zealand dollar, Romanian leu, Papua New Guinea kina, Canadian dollar, and other circulating, as well as commemorative, banknotes of a number of other countries. They are said to be more secure, cleaner, and more durable than paper notes, but U.S. banknotes are already designed to be more durable than traditional cotton-based banknotes, seeing as they are 25% linen. One major issue with implementing these or any new counterfeiting countermeasures, however, is that (other than under Executive Order 6102 as well as the demonetization of Trade Dollars in 1876) the United States has never demonetized or required a mandatory exchange of any existing currency. Consequently, would-be counterfeiters can easily circumvent any new security features simply by counterfeiting older designs, although once a new design is launched, the older designs are usually withdrawn from circulation as they cycle through the Federal Reserve Banks.

U.S. currency does, however, bear several anti-counterfeiting features. Two of the most critical anti-counterfeiting features of U.S. currency are the paper and the ink. The ink and paper combine to create a distinct texture, particularly as the currency is circulated. The paper and the ink alone have no effect on the value of the dollar until post print. These characteristics can be hard to duplicate without the proper equipment and materials. Furthermore, recent redesigns of the $5, $10, $20, and $50 notes have added EURion constellation patterns which allows scanning software to recognize banknotes and refuse to scan them.

The differing sizes of other nations' banknotes is a security feature that eliminates one form of counterfeiting to which U.S. currency is prone: Counterfeiters can simply bleach the ink off a low-denomination note, such as a $1 or $5 bill, and reprint it as a higher-value note, such as a $100 bill. To counter this, the U.S. government has included in all $5 and higher denominated notes since the 1990 series a security thread, which is a vertical laminate strip imprinted with denomination information. Under ultraviolet light, the security thread fluoresces a different color for each denomination ($5 note: blue; $10 note: orange; $20 note: green; $50 note: yellow; $100 note: pink). Additionally the newly designed $100 launched in 2013 has a 3D security ribbon which has proven to be highly resistant to counterfeiting, yet easily understood by the public without special tools or lights.

According to the central banks, the number of counterfeited banknotes seized annually is about 10 in one million real bank notes for the Swiss franc, 50 in one million for the Euro, 100 in one million for United States dollar and 300 in one million for pound sterling (old style).

=== Differentiation ===
Critics, such as the American Council of the Blind, note that U.S. bills are relatively hard to tell apart: they use very similar designs, they are printed in the same colors (until the 2003 banknotes, in which a faint secondary color was added), and they are all the same size. The American Council of the Blind has argued that American paper currency design should use increasing sizes according to value or raised or indented features to make the currency more usable for people with visual impairments, since the denominations cannot currently be distinguished from one another non-visually. Use of Braille codes on currency is not considered a desirable solution because these markings would only be useful to people who know how to read Braille, and one Braille symbol can become confused with another if even one bump is rubbed off. Though some blind individuals say that they have no problems keeping track of their currency because they fold their bills in different ways or keep them in different places in their wallets, they nevertheless must rely on sighted people or currency-counting machines to determine the value of each bill before filing it away using the system of their choice. This means that no matter how organized they are, blind people still have to trust sighted people or machines each time they receive U.S. banknotes.

By contrast, other major currencies, such as the pound sterling and euro, feature notes of differing sizes: the size of the note increases with the denomination and different denominations are printed in different, contrasting colors. This is useful not only for the vision-impaired; they nearly eliminate the risk that, for example, someone might fail to notice a high-value note among low-value ones.

Multiple currency sizes were considered for U.S. currency, but makers of vending and change machines successfully argued that implementing such a wide range of sizes would greatly increase the cost and complexity of such machines. Similar arguments were unsuccessfully made in Europe prior to the introduction of multiple note sizes.

Alongside the contrasting colors and increasing sizes, many other countries' currencies contain tactile features missing from U.S. banknotes to assist the blind. For example, Canadian banknotes have a series of raised dots (not Braille) in the upper right corner to indicate denomination. Mexican peso banknotes also have raised patterns of dashed lines. The Indian rupee has raised patterns of different shapes printed for various denominations on the left of the watermark window (20: vertical rectangle; 50: square; 100: triangle; 500: circle; 1,000: diamond).

==== Lawsuit over U.S. banknote design ====
Ruling on a lawsuit filed in 2002 (American Council of the Blind v. Paulson), on November 28, 2006, U.S. District Judge James Robertson ruled that the American bills gave an undue burden to blind people and denied them "meaningful access" to the U.S. currency system. In his ruling, Robertson noted that the United States was the only nation out of 180 issuing paper currency that printed bills that were identical in size and color in all their denominations, and that the successful use of such features as varying sizes, raised lettering and tiny perforations used by other nations is evidence that the ordered changes are feasible. The plaintiff's attorney was quoted as saying "It's just frankly unfair that blind people should have to rely on the good faith of people they have never met in knowing whether they've been given the correct change." Government attorneys estimated that the cost of such a change ranges from $75 million in equipment upgrades and $9 million annual expenses for punching holes in bills to $178 million in one-time charges and $50 million annual expenses for printing bills of varying sizes.

Robertson accepted the plaintiff's argument that current practice violates Section 504 of the Rehabilitation Act. The judge ordered the United States Department of the Treasury to begin working on a redesign within 30 days, but the Treasury appealed the decision.

On May 20, 2008, in a 2-to-1 decision, the United States Court of Appeals for the District of Columbia Circuit upheld the earlier ruling, pointing out that the cost estimates were inflated and that the burdens on blind and visually impaired currency users had not been adequately addressed.

On October 3, 2008, on remand from the D.C. Circuit, D.C. District Court Judge Robertson granted the injunction.

As a result of the court's injunction, the Bureau of Engraving and Printing is planning to implement a raised tactile feature in the next redesign of each note, except the $1 bill (which is not allowed to be redesigned under a 2015 law), though the version of the $100 bill already is in progress. It also plans larger, higher-contrast numerals, more color differences, and distribution of currency readers to assist visually impaired people during the transition period. The Bureau received a comprehensive study on accessibility options in July 2009, and solicited public comments from May to August 2010.

The 2013 redesign of the $100 bill did not include distinguishing features for blind people. As of October 2022, the plan was to incorporate accessibility features into distributions of a new $10 bill in 2026, $50 bill in 2028, $20 bill in 2030 followed later by a new $5 then $100 notes later in the 2030s.

== Legal authorizations for currency, and limitations on design ==
The Secretary of the Treasury is charged with the obligation to produce currency and bonds. 31 U.S.C. § 5114. Treasury Department regulations further specify the quality of paper and ink to be used. 31 C.F.R. Part 601. The denominations and design of currency are not further specified by law; for example, the choice of $1, $2, $5, $10, $20, $50, and $100, and the portraits on each, are largely left to the discretion of the Secretary of the Treasury.

There are few requirements set by Congress. The national motto "In God We Trust" must appear on all U.S. currency and coins. Though the motto had periodically appeared on coins since 1865, it did not appear on currency (other than interest-bearing notes in 1861) until a law passed in 1956 required it. It began to appear on Federal Reserve Notes delivered from 1964 to 1966, depending on denomination.

The portraits appearing on the U.S. currency can feature only people who have died, whose names should be included below each of the portraits. Since the standardization of the bills in 1928, the Department of the Treasury has chosen to feature the same portraits on the bills. These portraits were decided upon in 1929 by a committee appointed by the Treasury. Originally, the committee had decided to feature U.S. presidents because they were more familiar to the public than other potential candidates. The Treasury altered this decision, however, to include three statesmen who were also well known to the public: Alexander Hamilton (the first Secretary of the Treasury who appears on the $10 bill), Benjamin Franklin (an early advocate of paper currency who appears on the $100 bill), and Salmon P. Chase (the Secretary of the Treasury who reintroduced national paper currency and appeared on the obsolete $10,000 bill) In 2016, the Treasury announced a number of design changes to the $5, $10 and $20 bills; to be introduced over the next ten years. The redesigns include:

- The back of the $5 bill will be changed to showcase historical events at the pictured Lincoln Memorial by adding portraits of Marian Anderson (due to her famous performance there after being barred from Constitution Hall because of her race), Martin Luther King Jr. (due to his famous I Have A Dream speech), and Eleanor Roosevelt (who arranged Anderson's performance).
- The back of the $10 bill will be changed to show a 1913 march for women's suffrage in the United States, plus portraits of Sojourner Truth, Lucretia Mott, Susan B. Anthony, Alice Paul, and Elizabeth Cady Stanton.
- On the $20 bill, Andrew Jackson will move to the back (reduced in size, alongside the White House) and Harriet Tubman will appear on the front.

After an unsuccessful attempt in the proposed Legal Tender Modernization Act of 2001, the Omnibus Appropriations Act of 2009 required that none of the funds set aside for either the Treasury or the Bureau of Engraving and Printing may be used to redesign the $1 bill. This is because any change would affect vending machines and the risk of counterfeiting is low for this small denomination. This superseded the Federal Reserve Act (Section 16, Paragraph 8) which gives the Treasury permission to redesign any banknote to prevent counterfeiting.

In February 2025, South Carolina Congressman Joe Wilson and three co-sponsors introduced a bill for a $250 Donald Trump note, including language that would allow a living person's image to appear. In May 2026, approaching the nation's 250th anniversary in July, Treasury Secretary Scott Bessent, called on Congress to authorize the $250 bill. While the bill might pass the House, Senate passage seemed unlikely.

== Series ==
Notes issued prior to 1928 were 7 7/16 by 3 9/64 inches (18.9 cm × 8.0 cm). Per the Treasury Department Appropriation Bill of 1929, notes issued after 1928 were to be 6 5/16 by 2 11/16 inches (16.0 cm × 6.8 cm), which allowed the Treasury Department to produce 12 notes per 16 1/4-by-13 1/4-inch (41 cm × 34 cm) sheet of paper that previously would yield 8 notes at the old size.

Small size notes (described as such due to their size relative to the earlier large-size notes) are an average 6 1/8 by 2 5/8 inches (15.6 cm × 6.7 cm), the size of modern U.S. currency.

=== Large size notes ===
Series 1914 FRN were the first of two large-size issues. Denominations were $5, $10, $20, $50, and $100 printed first with a red seal and then continued with a blue seal. Series 1918 notes were issued in $500, $1,000, $5,000, and $10,000 denominations. The latter two denominations exist only in institutional collections. Series 1914 and 1918 notes in the following two tables are from the National Numismatic Collection at the National Museum of American History (Smithsonian Institution).

Series	Denominations	Obligation clause
1914	$5, $10, $20, $50, $100	"This note is receivable by all national and member banks and Federal Reserve Banks and for all taxes, customs and other public dues. It is redeemable in gold on demand at the Treasury Department of the United States in the city of Washington, District of Columbia or in gold or lawful money at any Federal Reserve Bank."
1918	$500, $1,000, $5,000, $10,000	"This note is receivable by all national and member banks and Federal Reserve Banks and for all taxes, customs and other public dues. It is redeemable in gold on demand at the Treasury Department of the United States in the city of Washington, District of Columbia or in gold or lawful money at any Federal Reserve Bank."

==== District seals ====
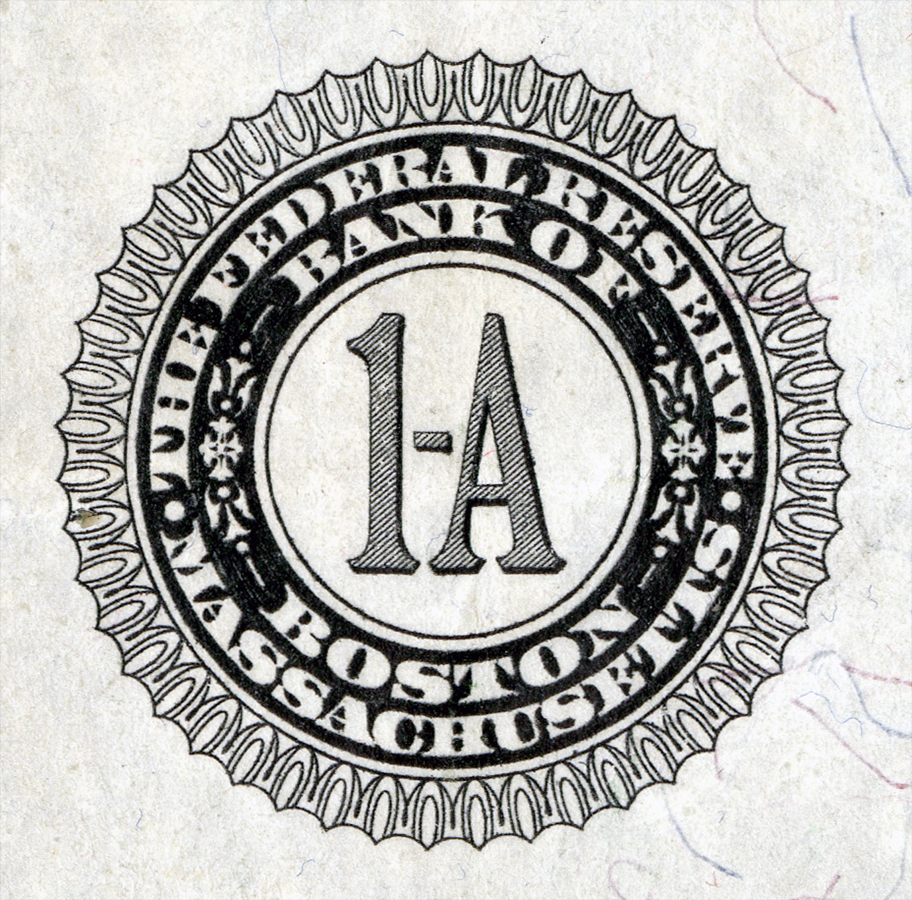
Federal Reserve Bank of Boston

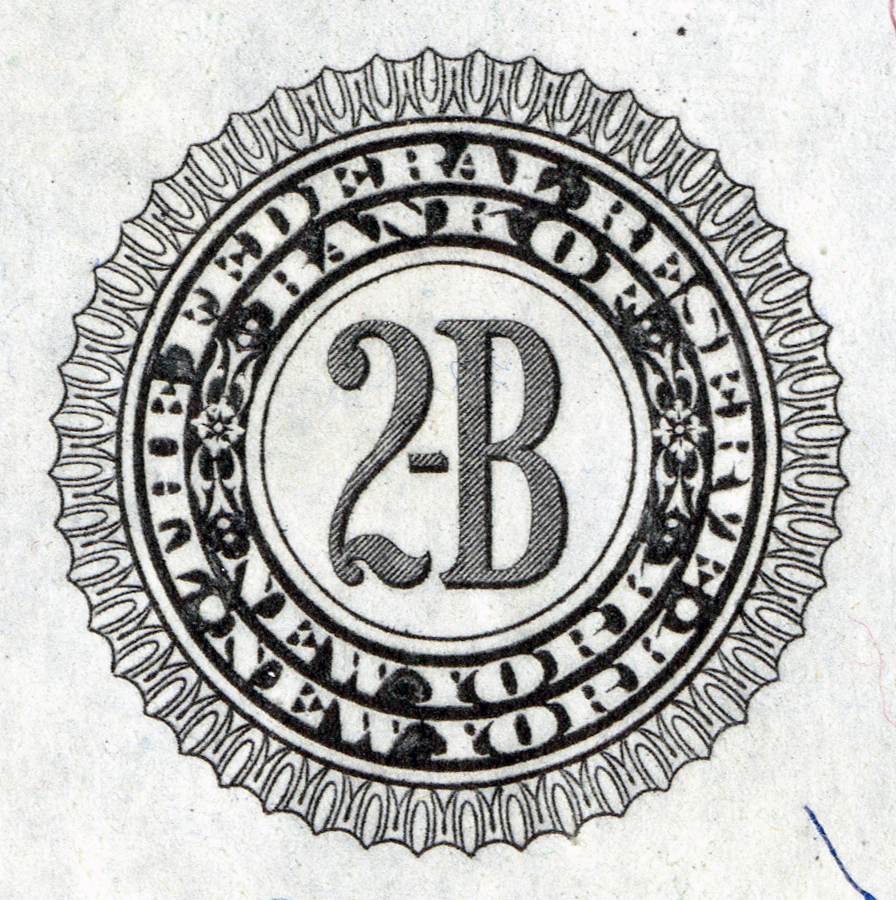
Federal Reserve Bank of New York

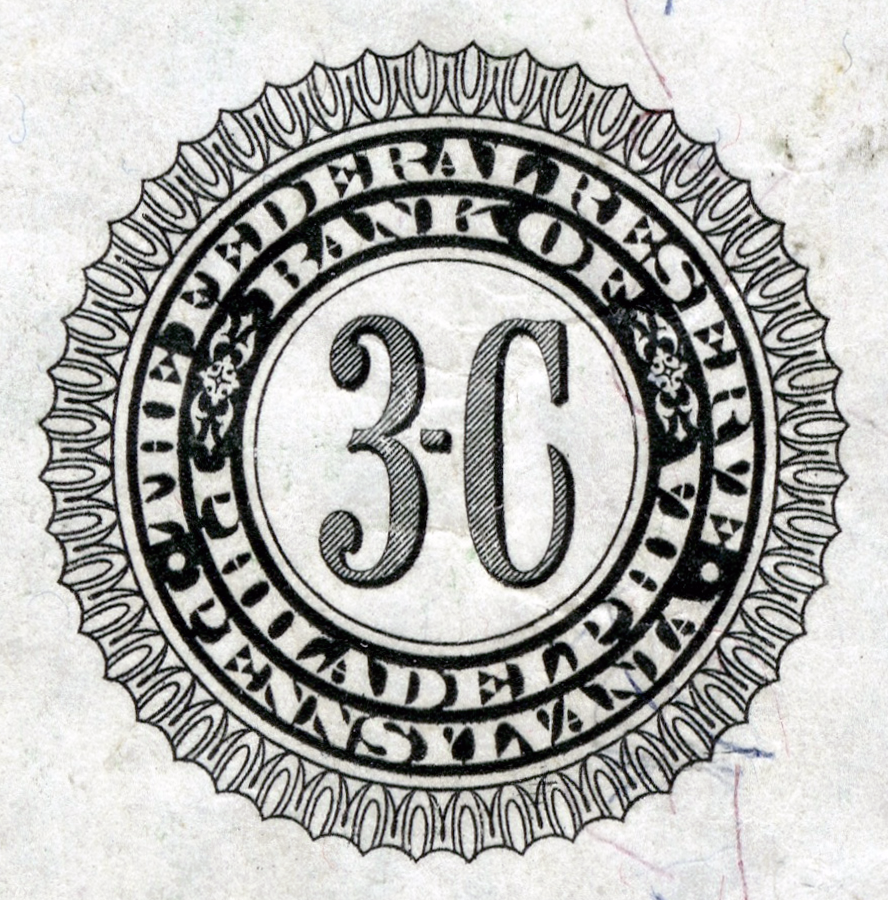
Federal Reserve Bank of Philadelphia

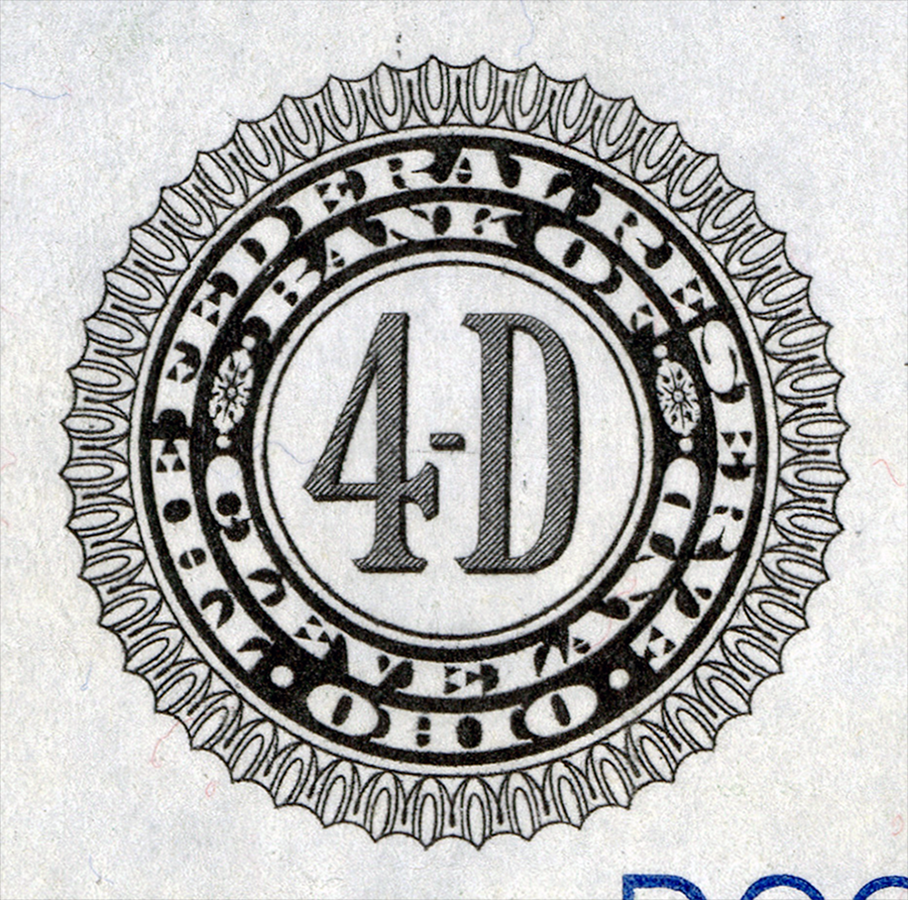
Federal Reserve Bank of Cleveland

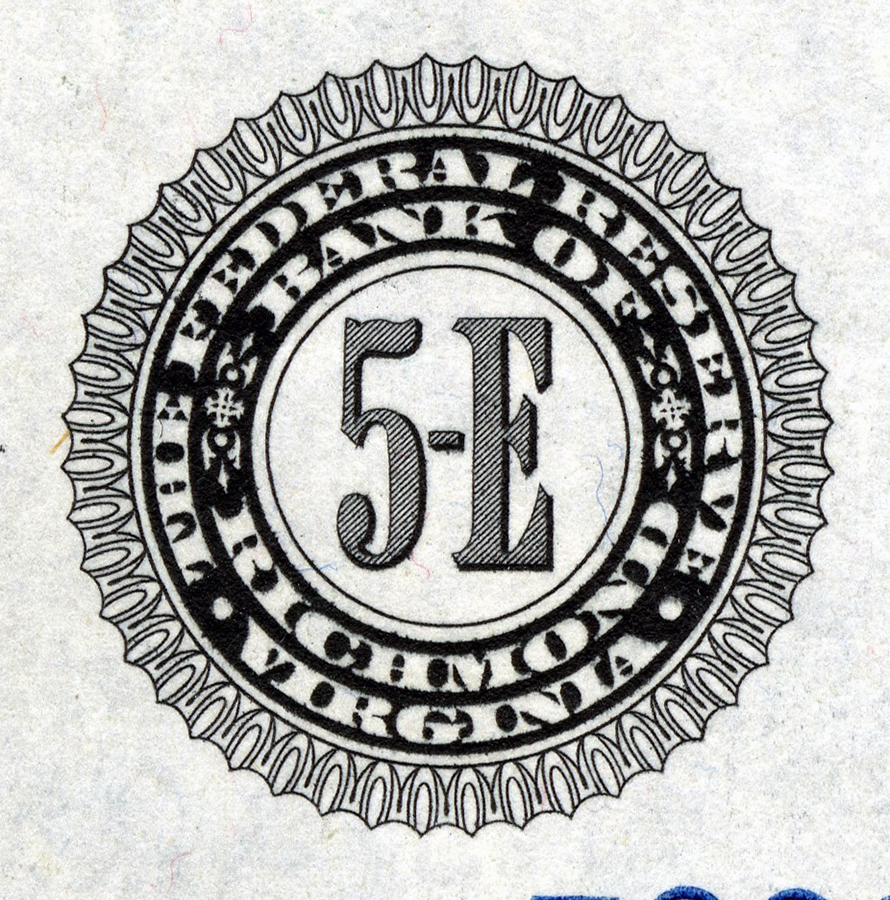
Federal Reserve Bank of Richmond

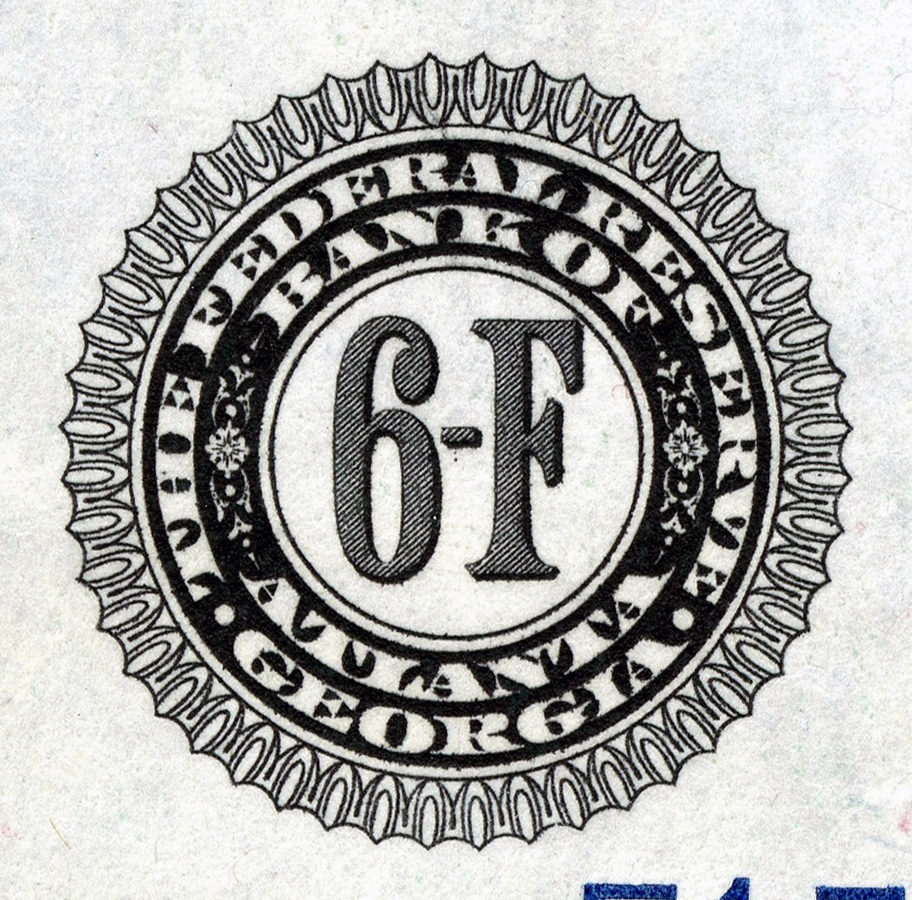
Federal Reserve Bank of Atlanta

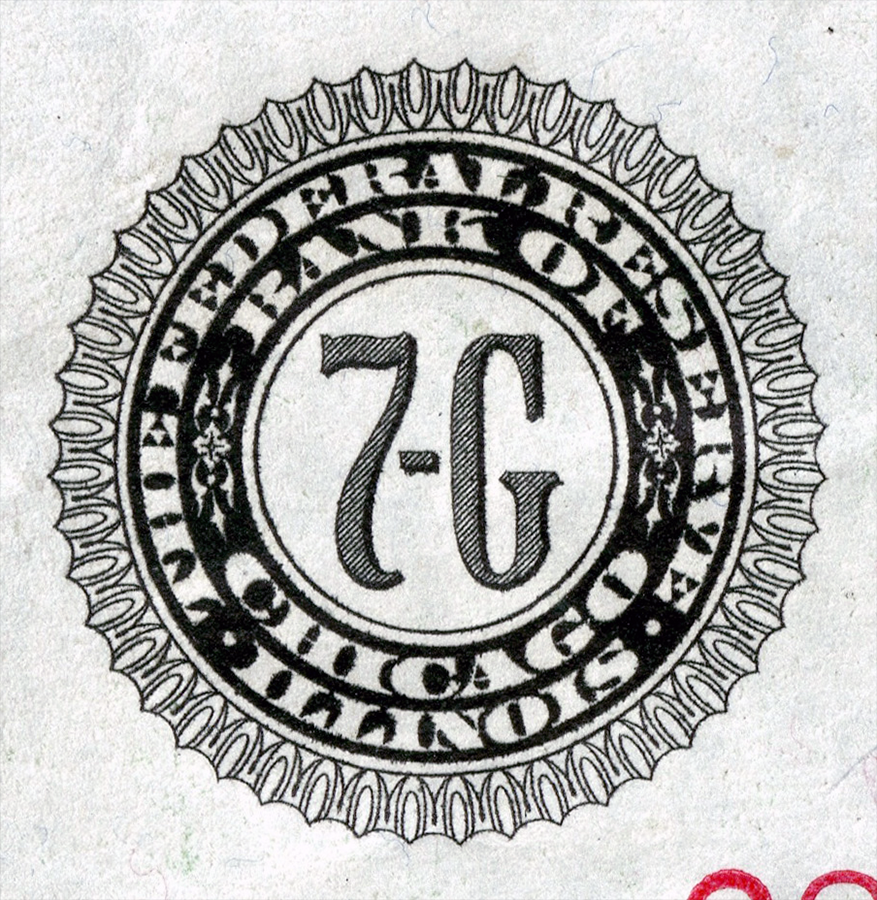
Federal Reserve Bank of Chicago

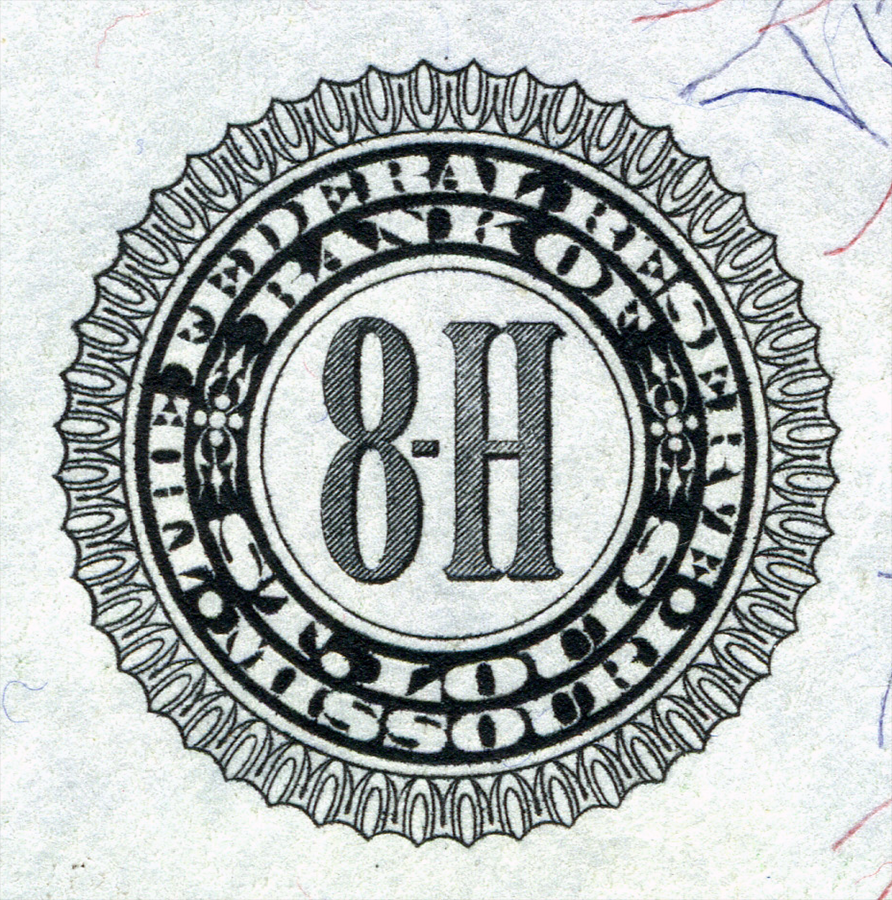
Federal Reserve Bank of St. Louis

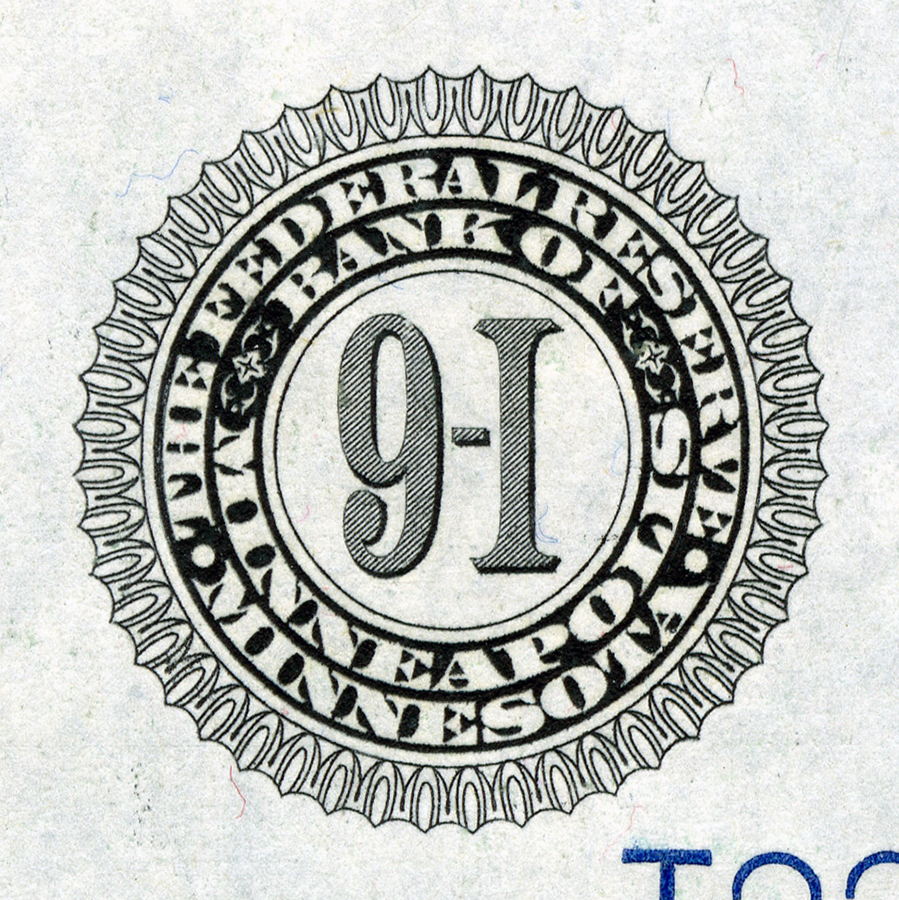
Federal Reserve Bank of Minneapolis

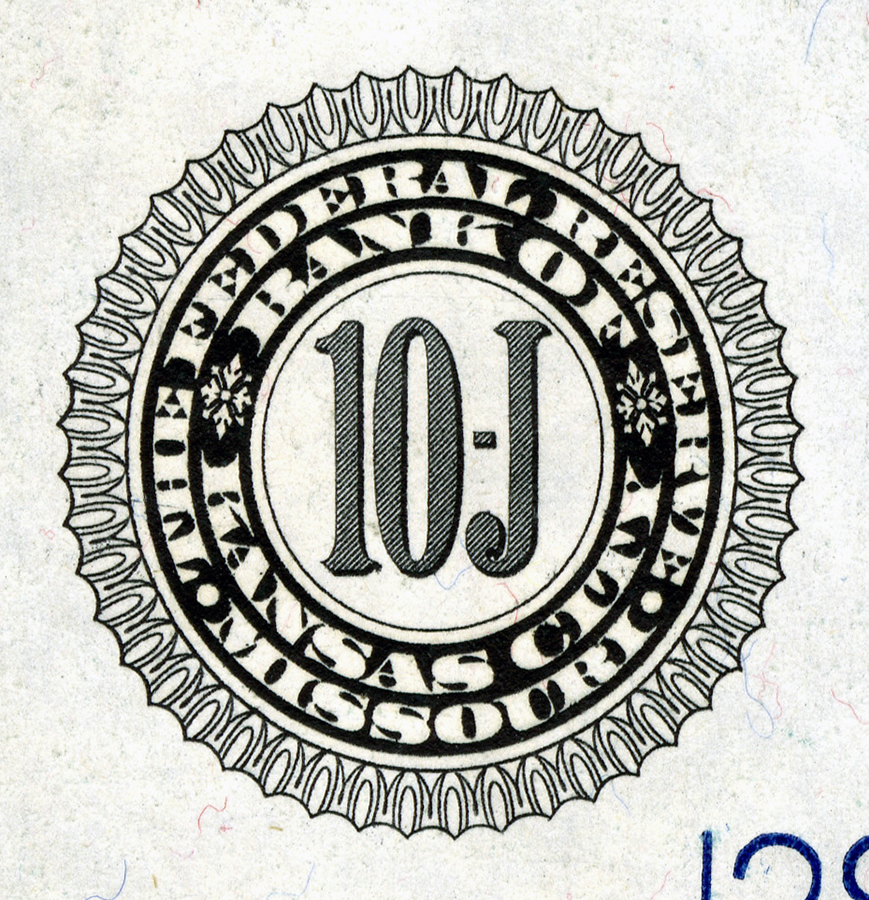
Federal Reserve Bank of Kansas City

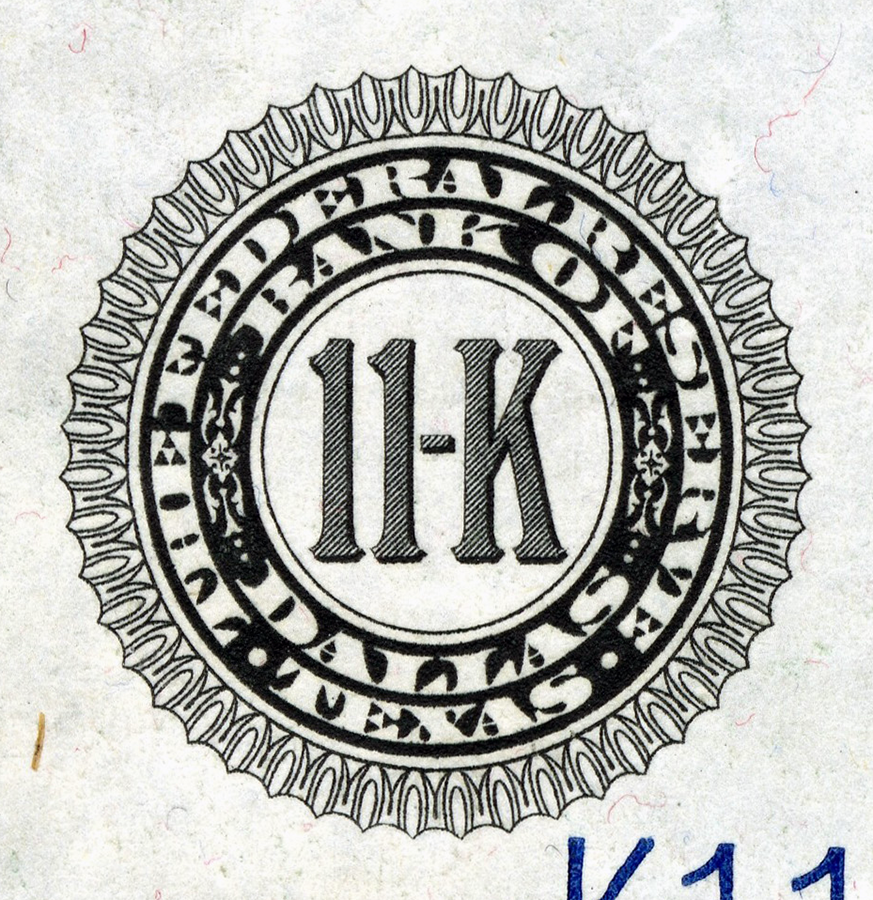
Federal Reserve Bank of Dallas

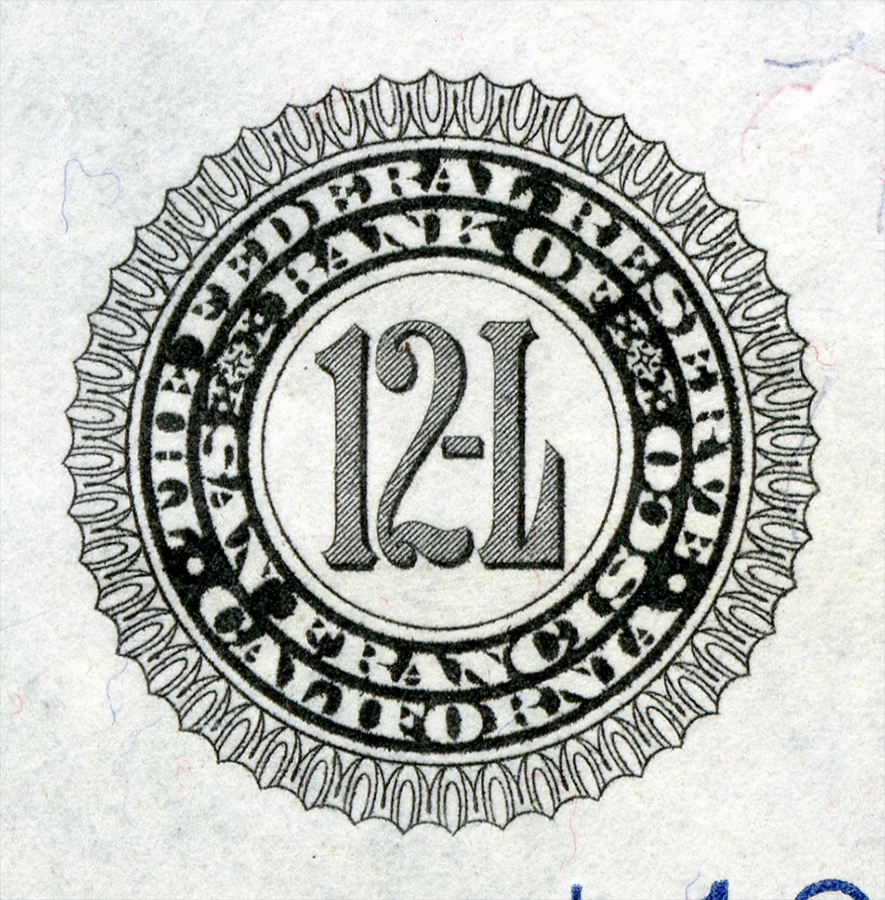
Federal Reserve Bank of San Francisco

==== Series 1914 ====
Denomination type set of 1914 Federal Reserve Notes
Value	Fr.	Red Seal	Blue Seal	Portrait and engraving
$5	832a 848			Abraham Lincoln
$10	894b 919a			Andrew Jackson
$20	958a 1010			Grover Cleveland
$50	1019a 1053			Ulysses S. Grant
$100	1074a 1131			Benjamin Franklin

==== Series 1918 ====
Denomination type set of 1918 Federal Reserve Notes
Value	Fr.	Image	Portrait and engraving
$500	1132d		John Marshall
$1,000	1133d		Alexander Hamilton
$5,000	1134d		James Madison
$10,000	1135d		Salmon P. Chase

=== Small size notes ===
Series	Denominations issued								Obligation clause	Remarks
Small portrait notes
1928			$5	$10	$20	$50	$100	$500, $1,000, $5,000, $10,000	"Redeemable in gold on demand at the United States Treasury, or in gold or lawful money at any Federal Reserve Bank"	Branch ID in numerals. See also Funnyback.
1934			$5	$10	$20	$50	$100	$500, $1,000, $5,000, $10,000	"This note is legal tender for all debts, public and private, and is redeemable in lawful money at the United States Treasury, or at any Federal Reserve Bank"	Branch ID in letters; during the Great Depression
1950			$5	$10	$20	$50	$100		"This note is legal tender for all debts, public and private, and is redeemable in lawful money at the United States Treasury, or at any Federal Reserve Bank"	Slight design changes: branch logo; placements of signatures, "Series xxxx", and "Washington, D.C.",
1963, 1963A, 1963B, 1969, 1969A, 1969B, 1969C, 1974	$1		$5	$10	$20	$50	$100		"This note is legal tender for all debts, public and private"	First $1 FRN; "Will pay to the bearer on demand" removed; Seal in Latin replaced by seal in English in 1969
1976		$2							"This note is legal tender for all debts, public and private"	First $2 FRN, Bicentennial
1977	$1		$5	$10	$20	$50	$100		"This note is legal tender for all debts, public and private"	
1977A	$1		$5	$10	$20				"This note is legal tender for all debts, public and private"	
1981, 1981A, 1985	$1		$5	$10	$20	$50	$100		"This note is legal tender for all debts, public and private"	
1988	$1		$5			$50	$100		"This note is legal tender for all debts, public and private"	
1988A	$1		$5		$20	$50			"This note is legal tender for all debts, public and private"	
1990				$10	$20	$50	$100		"This note is legal tender for all debts, public and private"	All denominations feature a security thread imprinted with the letters “USA” and the note’s numeral or word in an alternating pattern, visible from both sides. Under ultraviolet light, the thread glows in different colors depending on the denomination.
1993	$1		$5	$10	$20	$50	$100		"This note is legal tender for all debts, public and private"	The $5 note contains a security thread imprinted with the letters “USA” and the word “FIVE” in an alternating pattern, visible from both sides. Under ultraviolet light, the thread glows blue.
1995	$1	$2	$5	$10	$20				"This note is legal tender for all debts, public and private"	
Large portrait notes ($1 and $2 remain small-portrait)
1996					$20	$50	$100		"This note is legal tender for all debts, public and private"	
1999	$1		$5	$10	$20		$100		"This note is legal tender for all debts, public and private"	
2001	$1		$5	$10	$20	$50	$100		"This note is legal tender for all debts, public and private"	
2003	$1	$2	$5	$10			$100		"This note is legal tender for all debts, public and private"	
2003A	$1	$2	$5				$100		"This note is legal tender for all debts, public and private"	
2006			$5				$100		"This note is legal tender for all debts, public and private"	
2006A							$100		"This note is legal tender for all debts, public and private"	
Color notes ($1 and $2 remain small-portrait)
2004					$20	$50			"This note is legal tender for all debts, public and private"	
2004A				$10	$20	$50			"This note is legal tender for all debts, public and private"	
2006	$1		$5	$10	$20	$50			"This note is legal tender for all debts, public and private"	
2009	$1	$2	$5	$10	$20	$50	$100		"This note is legal tender for all debts, public and private"	
2009A							$100		"This note is legal tender for all debts, public and private"	
2013	$1	$2	$5	$10	$20	$50	$100		"This note is legal tender for all debts, public and private"	
2017	$1			$10	$20				"This note is legal tender for all debts, public and private"	
2017A	$1	$2	$5	$10	$20	$50	$100		"This note is legal tender for all debts, public and private"	
2021	$1		$5	$10	$20	$50	$100		"This note is legal tender for all debts, public and private"	
2025			$5		$20		$100		"This note is legal tender for all debts, public and private"	

=== Series 1928–1995 ===
Small size notes
Image		Value	Description		First series	Last series
Obverse	Reverse	Value	Obverse	Reverse	First series	Last series
		$1	George Washington	Great Seal of the United States	1963	Current (2021)
		$2	Thomas Jefferson	Declaration of Independence by John Trumbull	1976	Current (2017A)
		$5	Abraham Lincoln	Lincoln Memorial	1928	1995
		$10	Alexander Hamilton	Treasury Department Building	1928	1995
		$20	Andrew Jackson	White House	1928	1995
		$50	Ulysses S. Grant	United States Capitol	1928	1993
		$100	Benjamin Franklin	Independence Hall	1928	1993
		$500	William McKinley	"Five Hundred Dollars"	1928	1934
		$1000	Grover Cleveland	"One Thousand Dollars"	1928	1934
		$5000	James Madison	"Five Thousand Dollars"	1928	1934
		$10,000	Salmon P. Chase	"Ten Thousand Dollars"	1928	1934

=== Series 1996–2003 (Large portrait notes) ===
Small size notes
Image		Value	Description		First series	Last series
Obverse	Reverse	Value	Obverse	Reverse	First series	Last series
		$5	Abraham Lincoln	Lincoln Memorial	1999	2006
		$10	Alexander Hamilton	Treasury Department Building	1999	2003
		$20	Andrew Jackson	White House	1996	2001
		$50	Ulysses S. Grant	United States Capitol	1996	2001
		$100	Benjamin Franklin	Independence Hall	1996	2006A (Note: Series 2006A was produced from 2011 to 2013 due to issues with the printing process for the colorized (NextGen) $100 notes and to meet the continuing high demand from banks.)

=== Series 2004–present (color notes) ===
Beginning in 2003, the Federal Reserve introduced a new series of bills, featuring images of national symbols of freedom. The new $20 bill was first issued on October 9, 2003; the new $50 on September 28, 2004; the new $10 bill on March 2, 2006; the new $5 bill on March 13, 2008; the new $100 bill on October 8, 2013. The one and two dollar bills still remain small portrait, unchanged, and not watermarked.

Post-2004 redesigned series
Color series
Images		Value	Background color	Fluorescent strip color	Description			First series	Date first issued
Obverse	Reverse	Value	Background color	Fluorescent strip color	Obverse	Reverse	Watermark	First series	Date first issued
		$5	Purple	Blue	President Abraham Lincoln; Great Seal of the United States	Lincoln Memorial	Two watermarks of the number "5"	2006	March 13, 2008
		$10	Orange		Secretary Alexander Hamilton; The phrase "We the People" from the United States Constitution; The torch of the Statue of Liberty	Treasury Building	Alexander Hamilton	2004A	March 2, 2006
		$20	Green		President Andrew Jackson; Eagle	White House	Andrew Jackson	2004	October 9, 2003
		$50	Pink	Yellow	President Ulysses S. Grant; Flag of the United States	United States Capitol	Ulysses S. Grant	2004	September 28, 2004
		$100	Teal	Pink	Benjamin Franklin; Declaration of Independence	Independence Hall	Benjamin Franklin	2009A (Note: While Series 2009A was the first series of these $100 bills released for circulation, the first printing was Series 2009 printed in 2010 and 2011. These were withheld from circulation due to issues with the printing process and none were released until 2016.)	October 8, 2013
These images are to scale at 0.7 pixel per millimeter (18 pixel per inch). For table standards, see the banknote specification table.

== See also ==
- Coins of the United States dollar
- Gold certificate (United States)
- National Bank Note
- Silver certificate (United States)
- United States Note
