= Catalina Vasquez Villalpando =

American government official

Catalina Vásquez Villalpando

39th Treasurer of the United States
- In office December 11, 1989 – January 20, 1993
- President: George H. W. Bush
- Preceded by: Katherine D. Ortega
- Succeeded by: Mary Ellen Withrow

Personal details
- Born: April 1, 1940 (age 86) San Marcos, Texas, U.S.
- Party: Republican

Catalina "Cathi" Vásquez Villalpando (born April 1, 1940) is the 39th Treasurer of the United States who served from December 11, 1989, to January 20, 1993 under President George H. W. Bush and is the only U.S. Treasurer ever to be sent to prison. She had held minor positions under President Ronald Reagan and had chaired the Republican National Hispanic Assembly. In 1994, Villalpando was found guilty of obstruction of justice and tax evasion.

== Early life and education ==
Villalpando was born Catalina Vásquez to a poor family in San Marcos, Texas, one of four girls and two boys. Villalpando's father, a lifelong Democrat and migrant worker, used to take her and her siblings out into the fields so they would know what it was like to pick crops for a living.

After attending parochial school, Villalpando graduated from San Marcos High School. She subsequently went to work at a jewelry store and as a secretary at Southwest Texas State College, where she attended part-time. She did not complete her studies at Southwest, but at the suggestion of her father enrolled at the University of Texas College of Business Administration.

Villalpando's association with Republican Party politics began at this time when she took a secretarial position with the Texas Republican Party in Austin, Texas while attending business school.

== Career ==
In 1969, Villalpando became an assistant to the local director of the Community Service Administration where she dealt with minority and business issues. Villalpando eventually became director and, later, worked for the now defunct Office of Economic Opportunity.

By the late 1970s, Villalpando was working for the Commerce Department's Minority Business Development Agency (MBDA) in Texas. In 1979, Villalpando returned to the private sector taking up the position of vice president for the Mid-South Oil Company. She also organized her own consulting firm, V. P. Promotions, providing public relations to minority-owned savings and loan institutions under a federal contract.

Villalpando was an early supporter of George H. W. Bush for the 1980 election cycle. After Ronald Reagan secured the GOP nomination, she enthusiastically volunteered in the Reagan-Bush campaign effort in Texas. She was rewarded with a position as staff assistant in the White House Office of Presidential Personnel when Reagan took up office in 1981. Later that year, she returned to Texas where she served as the voter groups coordinator for the TRP.

For the next two years, Villalpando was a prolific activist in both Republican and Hispanic circles, serving on the boards of the Texas Federation of Republican Women, the Southwest Voter Registration Education Project, the League of United Latin American Citizens, and the American GI Forum. Additionally, she was appointed to seats on the Texas Advisory Committee to the U.S. Commission on Civil Rights and the Secretary's Advisory Committee on Small and Disadvantaged Business Utilization at the Department of Transportation.

In 1983, Villalpando's work was noted by the Reagan administration and she returned to Washington, D.C. as a Special Assistant to the President for Public Liaison. In this capacity, she dealt with public interest groups, lobbyists, and the general public and soon stood out for her "formidable...administrative skills." Villalpando's political profile also rose considerably when her skills and ethnicity were utilized in outreach efforts to attract Hispanics to the Republican Party.

=== Private sector work ===
After two years, Villalpando left government service again and, in August 1985, took up the position of senior vice president – as well as partner and large shareholder – at Communications International, Inc. (CII), a Norcross, Georgia-based telecommunications firm. CII was run by its founder, Joseph Profit, a former Atlanta Falcons running back and popular businessman in Georgia who had served in various appointed capacities in the Reagan Administration and, later, the first Bush Administration. Villalpando was one of several high-profile Republicans that Profit brought on board who helped the company garner millions in federal contracts.

Despite her leaving government service during this time, Villalpando's political involvement, especially in regards to bringing more Hispanics into the Republican Party, did not cease.

In 1987, Villalpando became the national chair for the Republican National Hispanic Assembly (RNHA). At the time, the RNHA was the auxiliary of the Republican National Committee responsible for Hispanic outreach and advocacy on behalf of the Party. The effort to get her elected as the group's leader came at a time when the presidential campaigns of then Vice President Bush and Senate Minority Leader Robert Dole were engaged in a particularly nasty competition to win the support of Hispanic Republicans for the 1988 election cycle. Villalpando had developed a special talent for attracting Hispanics to the Party and, as a Bush ally, was expected to swing the support of the Assembly to his run for the GOP nod.

=== MBDA investigation ===
That same year, Villalpando's assumption of the RNHA leadership post came under scrutiny by the Commerce Department's inspector general. An unrelated investigation was already underway looking into allegations that MBDA director James Richardson Gonzalez and Ernest Olivas, Jr., an MBDA employee, had been using their positions to drum up support for Bush's campaign. The probe revealed that Olivas, a friend of Villalpando when the two were on staff together in the Reagan White House where he was the speech-writer for the vice president, had also been soliciting prominent Hispanic Republicans to support her bid for the RNHA chairmanship.

RNHA co-founder Francisco Vega was one of those contacted and who confirmed to investigators that Olivas had called him from his government office while on work time, a potential violation of the Hatch Act. Villalpando's role was tangential to the investigation and she was not implicated in any wrongdoing. Olivas subsequently left government service and became employed by Villalpando's company, CII, as manager of its Washington office.

== U.S. Treasurer ==
On April 4, 1989, President Bush nominated Villalpando to be Treasurer of the United States. She was confirmed by the United States Senate on November 20, 1989, and was sworn in by the president on December 11. In attendance at her ceremony was Senator Phil Gramm of Texas and Gustavo Petricioli, Mexico's ambassador to the United States. As U.S. Treasurer, Villalpando became the highest-ranking Latina in the Bush Administration exhibiting a high-profile presence in the Hispanic community on its behalf.

As U.S. Treasurer, Villalpando presided over the first major change in U.S. currency since the motto "In God We Trust" was introduced in 1957. Beginning in September 1991, $10, $20, $50, and $100 bills with new, advanced technology designed to defeat digital printers were introduced into public circulation. The same year, Villalpando initiated a special program to raise $37 million by selling commemorative coins honoring Mount Rushmore. Half of the money raised would go toward restoration of the monument – the cost of which was estimated at $40 million – and half to pay into the national debt.

A number of $1 1988 Series banknotes have been found with Catalina Villalpando's courtesy autograph, which adds value for numismatists.

=== Clinton comments ===
In August 1992, Villalpando became embroiled in controversy over comments made by her and Commerce Secretary and Bush campaign manager Robert Mosbacher. The comments concerned ongoing sex scandals and rumors surrounding Arkansas Governor and Democratic presidential nominee Bill Clinton and former San Antonio mayor Henry Cisneros. Visiting the New Jersey delegation at the 1992 Republican National Convention, Villalpando reportedly said to the delegates, "Can you imagine two skirt-chasers campaigning together?" She also questioned Clinton's qualifications.

Some members of the delegation were not pleased with the comments, including former New Jersey Governor Thomas Kean, who called the remarks "totally unnecessary." Although both Bush and Villalpando issued apologies, Clinton campaign spokesman George Stephanopoulos called on the president to dismiss both officials.

== Tax/CII scandal ==
=== Investigation ===
While still enveloped in the controversy surrounding her Clinton and Cisneros comments, Villalpando became the central figure in a criminal probe launched by the Department of Justice. The investigation initially focused on allegations that Villalpando accepted favors and other gratuities from CII while in office in violation of federal law. However, it also incorporated an array of potential charges including "bribery, conspiracy to defraud the government, making false or fraudulent claims, racketeering, making false statements to federal agents and fraud by wire, radio or television."

News of the investigation broke on October 29, the day after FBI agents raided several buildings and residences in Washington, D.C., Virginia, and Georgia. Among these were the homes of Villalpando and Olivas and the offices of CII in Norcross where boxes of documents were seized. The Treasury Department immediately placed Villalpando on leave. Olivas, who was already on leave from CII to act as director of Hispanic outreach for the Bush-Quayle re-election team, quit the campaign. Profit was not considered a suspect in the probe, telling reporters instead that investigators told him – and presumably other employees – that "'they...were witnesses' and would be asked to provide information."

Records obtained during the investigation revealed that Villalpando received in excess of $147,000 from CII after she assumed her post as U.S. Treasurer in December 1989. They further showed $441,417 in additional bonuses being received in the fall as she was readying her departure from the company. Finally, the records indicated that Villalpando still had between $250,000 and $500,000 in company stock.

According to Villalpando's notes, the $147,000 was listed as severance pay; however, no reference was made to it as required in the financial disclosure forms she submitted to the government upon being nominated. She did indicate at her confirmation hearings that she would retain her stock ownership in the company but promised to have no involvement in the firm's business. The following year, she received her severance payment and an additional $7,000 in accrued leave. Investigators were charged with determining whether these payments were expected but simply not reported or received in expectation of gaining influence in obtaining federal contracts.

CII, it was revealed, had a large amount of business with the government. Between 1983 and 1992, the telecommunications firm was awarded 56 non-competitive contracts totaling $68.6 million. As recently as the Persian Gulf War, CII had been awarded huge contracts to provide communication networks for U.S. forces in the region as well as to help rebuild Kuwaiti infrastructure after the war.

Though placed on leave at the end of October 1992, Villalpando remained in her post until the Clinton Administration was inaugurated in January, 1993.

=== Conviction ===
The investigation did not support charges of influence-peddling on Villalpando's part. Instead, the probe began to intersect with another criminal investigation ongoing within the Department of Housing and Urban Development (HUD) over fraud and the improper awarding of federal contracts during the Reagan administration. In May 1992, Villalpando was ordered to testify before a grand jury as well as produce certain documents related to that case involving HUD official Deborah Gore Dean. Villalpando's own investigation began to turn toward her failure to reveal compensation from CII and failure to pay appropriate taxes. The following year, she was also accused of obstruction of justice by lying to investigators as well as ordering the destruction of subpoenaed documents.

At her trial, prosecutors charged Villalpando with three felonies: tax evasion (specifically $47,013 in Federal income taxes), conspiracy to make false statements regarding her finances (namely that she believed she owed less than she did), and obstruction of a grand jury (due to the destruction of officially requested records in the HUD probe). The charges carried a maximum penalty of a $750,000 fine and 15 years imprisonment. Villalpando admitted to concealing "substantial funds and benefits", received by her from CII, information which was "capable of influencing the actions and judgments of those departments and agencies" tasked to evaluate her qualification for the post of U.S. Treasurer. She further admitted that the conspiracy to conceal information was begun as early as March 1989, when she first learned that President Bush intended to nominate her for the post. Villalpando also acknowledged that in July 1992, she asked her longtime acquaintance Olivas to destroy documents subpoenaed by the independent counsel in the Dean case.

On February 18, 1994, Villalpando pleaded guilty to all three counts and was released pending her sentencing at which time she was expected to cooperate with ongoing probes into CII contracts and HUD in return for consideration. At her sentencing, Villalpando received four months imprisonment, three years of probation (four months of which to be served under house arrest), 200 hours of community service, and a $150 tax evasion fee. Prosecutors had unsuccessfully sought a harsher penalty.

== Post-Treasurer years ==
In 2003, she appeared on a list produced by the D.C. government of notorious tax scofflaws. According to this report, the former treasurer owed the district government $168,417.72 in back taxes.

In 2006, Villalpando was awarded an honorary doctorate for her work from Atlantic Union College, a small liberal arts institution. She also served as that year's commencement speaker, admonishing the graduates to "embrace the tough times encountered in life." Villalpando also thanked the Seventh-day Adventist Church – under whose auspices the college operates – for being there when she was at her lowest.

== Personal life ==
Villalpando married her high school sweetheart in 1970. The marriage produced one son and ended in divorce a few years later. As of 2003 she resided in Reisterstown, Maryland.

== See also ==
- List of federal political scandals in the United States
- List of Latino Republicans

== Notes ==
Political offices
| Preceded by Katherine D. Ortega | Treasurer of the United States; 1989-1993 | Succeeded by Mary Ellen Withrow |
