= Mary Ellen Withrow =

40th Treasurer of the United States

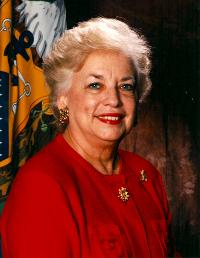

40th Treasurer of the United States
- In office March 1, 1994 – January 20, 2001
- President: Bill Clinton
- Preceded by: Catalina V. Villalpando
- Succeeded by: Rosario Marin

Treasurer of Ohio
- In office January 10, 1983 – March 1, 1994
- Governor: Dick Celeste; George Voinovich
- Preceded by: Gertrude Donahey
- Succeeded by: Ken Blackwell

Marion County Treasurer
- In office January 10, 1977 – January 10, 1983
- Preceded by: Ralph Wagner
- Succeeded by: Michelle Pearson

Personal details
- Born: October 2, 1930 (age 95) Marion County, Ohio, U.S.
- Party: Democratic

Mary Ellen Hinamon Withrow (born October 2, 1930) is an American activist and former politician who served as the 40th treasurer of the United States from March 1, 1994, to January 20, 2001, under President Bill Clinton.

She also was Treasurer when the $5, $10, $20, $50, and $100 notes were redesigned in the 1990s.

== Biography ==
A native of Marion County, Ohio, Withrow served as the treasurer of her home state of Ohio, a position to which she was elected in 1982, 1986, and 1990. Before that, she was elected Treasurer of her native Marion County, Ohio in 1976 and 1980. This makes her the only person to have held the post of treasurer at all three levels of government — local, state and national.

Withrow began her career in public service in 1969 as the first woman elected to the Elgin Local School Board in Marion County. As Ohio's Treasurer, Withrow instituted new programs, achieved record earnings, and was nationally recognized for her efficient management. Withrow was a Presidential Elector for Ohio in 1992 and a delegate to the 2000 Democratic National Convention from Ohio. She again served as a member of the Ohio delegation at the 2004 Democratic National Convention.

== Recognition ==
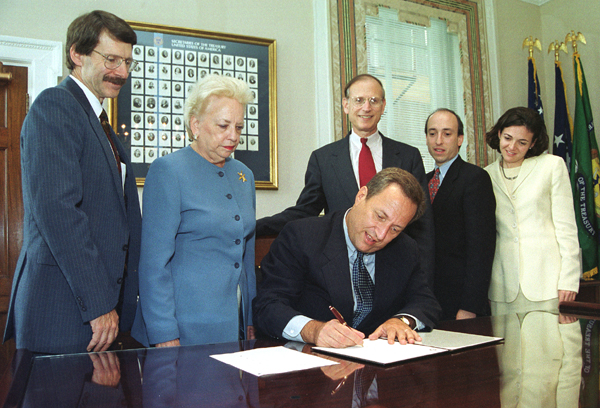
Withrow and other Treasury officials watch Secretary Summers affix his signature to new currency, 1999

Withrow is the recipient of numerous honors, including the Donald L. Scantlebury Memorial Award from the Treasury's Joint Financial Management Improvement Program for financial excellence and improvement in government, and the nation's "Most Valuable State Public Official" by City & State Newspaper in 1990.

Withrow has been the president of several Treasury-related associations, including the National Association of State Treasurers, and the National Association of State Auditors, Comptrollers and Treasurers.

== Activism ==
Withrow is an activist for women in government and is a member of the board of directors of Women Executives in State Government, an inductee into the Ohio Women's Hall of Fame and a recipient of a Women Executives in State Government fellowship to Harvard University. Following her retirement from office in January 2001, Withrow became active in the US Treasury's historical society. Withrow's collection of personal documents, photographs, awards and personal papers are housed at the Marion County Historical Society, Marion, Ohio. She has appeared in television ads supporting Ohio's Issue 3 casino proposal. She is also quoted extensively in newspaper advertisements and direct mailings of by Federated Mint LLC and Lincoln Treasury. These advertisements use her former title to give legitimacy to questionable items.

== Legacy ==
Marion City Schools announced in September 2019 that it would be naming two new schools after Withrow - Mary Ellen Withrow Middle School Academy and the Mary Ellen Withrow High School Academy.

Party political offices
Preceded by Gertrude Walton Donahey	Democratic nominee for Treasurer of Ohio; 1982, 1986, 1990	Succeeded by Barbara Sykes
Political offices
Preceded by Gertrude W. Donahey	Treasurer of Ohio; 1983–1994	Succeeded by J. Kenneth Blackwell
Preceded by Catalina Vásquez Villalpando	Treasurer of the United States; 1994–2001	Succeeded by Rosario Marin
