= 1974 Ohio State Treasurer election =

- November 5, 1974
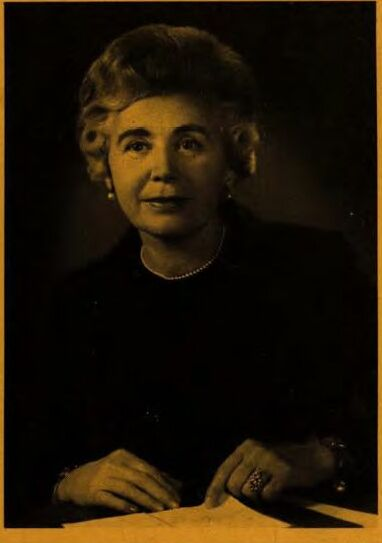

Nominee	Gertrude Walton Donahey	Richard H. Harris
Party	Democratic	Republican
Popular vote	1,758,559	1,025,697
Percentage	63.16%	36.84%
- County results Donahey: 50–60% 60–70% 70–80% Harris: 50–60%
Ohio State Treasurer before election
Gertrude Walton Donahey
Democratic
Elected Ohio State Treasurer
Gertrude Walton Donahey
Democratic

The 1974 Ohio State Treasurer election was held on November 5, 1974, to elect the Ohio State Treasurer. Primaries were held on May 7, 1974. Democratic incumbent Ohio State Treasurer Gertrude Walton Donahey won re-election in a landslide, defeating Republican Richard H. Harris with 63.16% of the vote.

== Democratic primary ==
=== Candidates ===
- Gertrude Walton Donahey, incumbent Ohio State Treasurer (1971–1983)

=== Campaign ===
Donahey won renomination without opposition.

=== Results ===
Democratic primary results
Party	Candidate	Votes	%
Democratic	Gertrude Walton Donahey	677,349	100.00%
Total votes		677,349	100.00%

== Republican primary ==
=== Candidates ===
- Richard H. Harris

=== Campaign ===
Harris won the Republican nomination unopposed.

=== Results ===
Republican primary results
Party	Candidate	Votes	%
Republican	Richard H. Harris	453,116	100.00%
Total votes		453,116	100.00%

== General election ==
=== Candidates ===
- Gertrude Walton Donahey, incumbent Ohio State Treasurer (1971–1983) (Democratic)
- Richard H. Harris (Republican)

=== Results ===
1974 Ohio State Treasurer election results
Party	Candidate	Votes	%	±%
Democratic	Gertrude Walton Donahey	1,758,559	63.16%	+7.56
Republican	Richard H. Harris	1,025,697	36.84%	−7.56
Total votes		2,784,256	100.00%	
Democratic hold				
