= 2026 Ohio Secretary of State election =

- November 3, 2026
- Reporting: 98% as of 2:42 PM EST
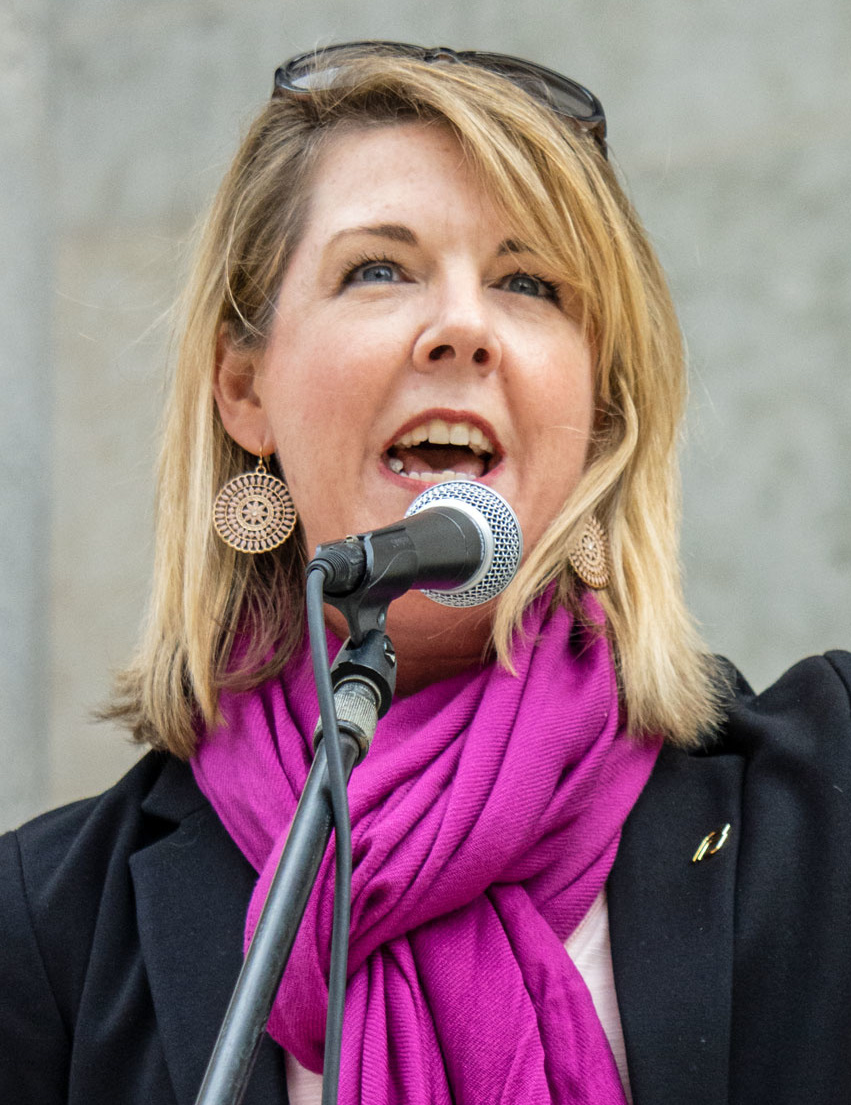

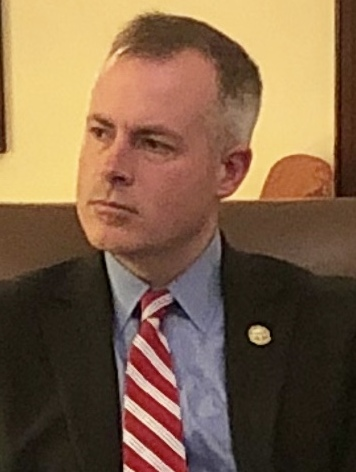
Nominee	Allison Russo	Robert Sprague
Party	Democratic	Republican
Popular vote	2,287,160	2,129,981
Percentage	50.25%	46.80%
- County results Russo: 40–50% 50–60% 60–70% 70–80% Sprague: 40–50% 50–60% 60–70% 70–80% 80–90%
Secretary of State before election
Frank LaRose
Republican
Elected Secretary of State
Allison Russo
Democratic

The 2026 Ohio Secretary of State election was held on November 3, 2026, to elect the secretary of state of Ohio. Incumbent Republican Secretary of State Frank LaRose was term-limited and instead successfully ran for state auditor. Primary elections were held on May 5, 2026.

Term-limited Republican state treasurer Robert Sprague ran to succeed LaRose, but was defeated by former Ohio House of Representatives minority leader Allison Russo in the general election.

== Republican primary ==
=== Candidates ===
==== Nominee ====
- Robert Sprague, Ohio state treasurer (2019–present) (previously ran for governor)

==== Eliminated in primary ====
- Marcell Strbich, retired Air Force officer and combat veteran

==== Withdrawn ====
- Niraj Antani, former state senator (2021–2024) and candidate for Ohio's 2nd congressional district in 2024 (ran for state treasurer, later withdrew)

==== Declined ====
- Jay Edwards, former state representative from the 94th district (2017–2025) (ran for state treasurer)

=== Endorsements ===
Robert Sprague

Labor unions

- Central Midwest Regional Council of Carpenters
Marcell Strbich

Executive branch officials

- Michael Flynn, former United States National Security advisor (2017) (Note: Flynn was a Democrat during his time as National Security advisor, but became a registered Republican in 2021.)
Declined to endorse

Newspapers

- The Plain Dealer

=== Polling ===
Poll source	Date(s) administered	Sample size (Note: Key: A – all adults RV – registered voters LV – likely voters V – unclear)	Margin of error	Robert Sprague	Marcell Strbich	Undecided
co/efficient (R)	January 20–22, 2026	819 (LV)	± 3.4%	4%	12%	84%

=== Results ===
Primary results by county: Sprague: 50–60%; 60–70%; 70–80%; 80–90%; Strbich: 50–60%

Republican primary
Party	Candidate	Votes	%
Republican	Robert Sprague	543,551	70.2
Republican	Marcell Strbich	230,584	29.8
Total votes		774,135	100.0

== Democratic primary ==
=== Candidates ===
==== Nominee ====
- Allison Russo, former minority leader of the Ohio House of Representatives (2022–2025) and nominee for Ohio's 15th congressional district in 2021

==== Eliminated in primary ====
- Bryan Hambley, oncologist at UC Health

=== Endorsements ===
Bryan Hambley

U.S. representatives

- Mary Jo Kilroy, former OH-15 (2009–2011)

Statewide officials

- Dick Celeste, former governor of Ohio (1983–1991)

State legislators

- Nickie Antonio, Senate minority leader from SD-23 (2019–present)

Local officials

- Tony Cuda, former interim mayor of Cleveland Heights (2025), president of Cleveland Heights Council (2022–present)
- Stephanie Howse-Jones, Cleveland City Council Ward 7 (2022–present)

Political parties

- Ohio Working Families Party
Allison Russo

Organizations

- 314 Action
- EMILYs List
- Ohio Chamber of Commerce

Labor unions

- Greater Cincinnati Building and Construction Trades Council
- Ohio Education Association

Newspapers

- The Plain Dealer
Declined to endorse

Political parties

- Ohio Democratic Party

=== Fundraising ===
Campaign finance reports as of January 30, 2026
Candidate	Raised	Spent	Cash on hand
Brian Hambley (D)	$886,244 (Note: $165,000 of this total was self-funded by Hambley.)	$175,480	$545,918
Allison Russo (D)	$367,725	$175,773	$192,458
Source: Ohio Secretary of State

=== Results ===
Primary results by county: Russo: 50–60%; 60–70%; 70–80%

Democratic primary results
Party	Candidate	Votes	%
Democratic	Allison Russo	487,313	67.4
Democratic	Bryan Hambley	235,668	32.6
Total votes		722,981	100.0

== Libertarian primary ==
=== Candidates ===
==== Nominee ====
- Tom Pruss, small business owner and nominee for Ohio's 9th congressional district in 2024

=== Results ===
Libertarian primary results
Party	Candidate	Votes	%
Libertarian	Tom Pruss	8,633	100.0
Total votes		8,633	100.0

== General election ==
=== Predictions ===
Source	Ranking	As of
Sabato's Crystal Ball	Tossup	October 29, 2026

=== Post-primary endorsements ===
Allison Russo (D)

Organizations

- EMILYs List

=== Results ===
2026 Ohio Secretary of State election
Party	Candidate	Votes	%
Democratic	Allison Russo	2,287,160	50.25%
Republican	Robert Sprague	2,129,981	46.80%
Libertarian	Tom Pruss	134,179	2.95%
Total votes		4,551,320	100.0%
Democratic gain from Republican			
