= 1970 Ohio State Treasurer election =

- November 3, 1970
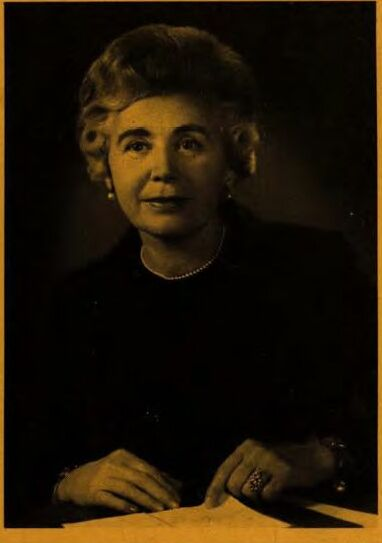

Nominee	Gertrude Walton Donahey	Robin Turner
Party	Democratic	Republican
Popular vote	1,591,959	1,271,470
Percentage	55.60%	44.40%
- County results Donahey: 50–60% 60–70% Turner: 50–60% 60–70%
Ohio State Treasurer before election
John D. Herbert
Republican
Elected Ohio State Treasurer
Gertrude Walton Donahey
Democratic

The 1970 Ohio State Treasurer election was held on November 3, 1970, to elect the Ohio State Treasurer. Republican incumbent Ohio State Treasurer John D. Herbert chose not to run for re-election to a third term, instead unsuccessfully running for Ohio Attorney General. Primaries were held on May 5, 1970. Democrat Gertrude Walton Donahey won the election, defeating Ohio State Senator Robin Turner by eleven percentage points.

With her victory, Donahey become the first woman to be elected to executive statewide office in Ohio and the second woman to be elected to statewide office following Florence E. Allen.

== Republican primary ==
=== Candidates ===
- Robin Turner, Ohio State Senator (1963–1973)
- Ralph J. Perk Jr.
- David S. Holcomb
- Dale Davis
- Anthony B. Baldwin

=== Campaign ===
Turner won the Republican nomination in a crowded primary by a razor thin margin of 0.47 percentage points.

=== Results ===
Republican primary results
Party	Candidate	Votes	%
Republican	Robin Turner	184,371	24.47%
Republican	Ralph J. Perk Jr.	180,796	24%
Republican	David S. Holcomb	146,163	19.40%
Republican	Dale Davis	144,813	19.22%
Republican	Anthony B. Baldwin	97,308	12.91%
Total votes		753,451	100.00%

== Democratic primary ==
=== Candidates ===
- Gertrude Walton Donahey
- James H. Bell, Cleveland City Council Member
- Dennis E. Thompson

=== Campaign ===
Donahey won the Democratic nomination by a comfortable margin of nine percentage points over her two opponents.

=== Results ===
Democratic primary results
Party	Candidate	Votes	%
Democratic	Gertrude Walton Donahey	321,889	43.91%
Democratic	James H. Bell	255,422	34.84%
Democratic	Dennis E. Thompson	155,781	21.25%
Total votes		733,092	100.00%

== General election ==
=== Candidates ===
- Gertrude Walton Donahey (Democratic)
- Robin Turner, Ohio State Senator (1963–1973) (Republican)

=== Results ===
1970 Ohio State Treasurer election results
Party	Candidate	Votes	%	±%
Democratic	Gertrude Walton Donahey	1,591,959	55.60%	+14.45
Republican	Robin Turner	1,271,470	44.40%	−14.45
Total votes		2,863,429	100.00%	
Democratic gain from Republican				
