= 2026 Ohio State Treasurer election =

- November 3, 2026
- Reporting: 98% as of 2:37 PM EST

Nominee	Seth Walsh	Jay Edwards
Party	Democratic	Republican
Popular vote	2,282,546	2,232,761
Percentage	50.55%	49.45%
- County results Walsh: 50–60% 60–70% 70–80% Edwards: 50–60% 60–70% 70–80% 80–90%
State Treasurer before election
Robert Sprague
Republican
Elected State Treasurer
Seth Walsh
Democratic

The 2026 Ohio state treasurer election took place on November 3, 2026, to elect the state treasurer of Ohio. Incumbent Republican State Treasurer Robert Sprague was term-limited and ineligible to run for re-election, and instead ran unsuccessfully for secretary of state. Primary elections were held on May 5, 2026.

== Republican primary ==
=== Candidates ===
==== Nominee ====
- Jay Edwards, former state representative (2017–2025)

==== Eliminated in primary ====
- Kristina Roegner, state senator from the 27th district (2019–present)

==== Withdrawn ====
- Niraj Antani, former state senator (2021–2024) and candidate for Ohio's 2nd congressional district in 2024 (previously ran for secretary of state)
- Michael Zuren, Lake County treasurer

=== Endorsements ===
Jay Edwards

Executive branch officials

- JD Vance, vice president of the United States (2025–present)

U.S. senators

- Bernie Moreno, Ohio (2025–present)
Kristina Roegner

State legislators

- Matt Huffman, speaker of the Ohio House of Representatives from the 78th district (2025–present) (Note: Huffman previously represented the 12th district in the Senate from 2017 to 2025, and was Senate president from 2019 to 2025. He also represented the 4th district in the state House from 2007 to 2014.)

Individuals

- Vivek Ramaswamy, founder of Roivant Sciences and 2026 gubernatorial candidate

Labor unions

- Associated Builders and Contractors of Central Ohio

Newspapers

- The Plain Dealer
Declined to endorse

Political parties

- Ohio Republican Party

=== Results ===
Primary results by county: Edwards: 50–60%; 60–70%; 70–80%; 80–90%; Roegner: 50–60%; 60–70%

Republican primary results
Party	Candidate	Votes	%
Republican	Jay Edwards	412,114	53.1
Republican	Kristina Roegner	364,556	46.9
Total votes		776,670	100.0

== Democratic primary ==
=== Candidates ===
==== Nominee ====
- Seth Walsh, Cincinnati city councilman (2022–present)

=== Results ===
Democratic primary results
Party	Candidate	Votes	%
Democratic	Seth Walsh	677,424	100.0
Total votes		677,424	100.0

== General election ==
=== Results ===
2026 Ohio state treasurer election
Party	Candidate	Votes	%	±%
Democratic	Seth Walsh			
Republican	Jay Edwards			
Total votes			100.0	
Democratic gain from Republican				
