= 1978 Ohio State Treasurer election =

- November 7, 1978
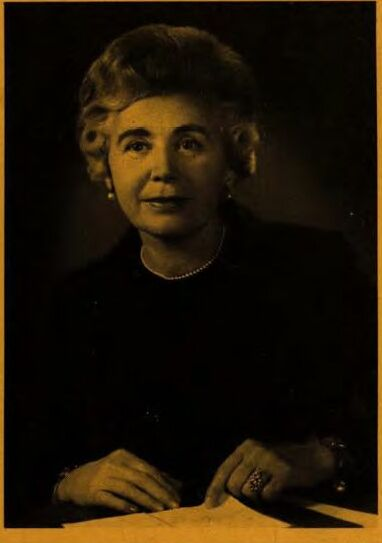

Nominee	Gertrude Walton Donahey	George C. Rogers
Party	Democratic	Republican
Popular vote	1,639,317	941,852
Percentage	63.51%	36.49%
- County results Donahey: 50–60% 60–70% 70–80% Rogers: 50–60%
Ohio State Treasurer before election
Gertrude Walton Donahey
Democratic
Elected Ohio State Treasurer
Gertrude Walton Donahey
Democratic

The 1978 Ohio State Treasurer election was held on November 7, 1978, to elect the Ohio State Treasurer. Primaries were held on June 6, 1978. Democratic incumbent Ohio State Treasurer Gertrude Walton Donahey won re-election to a third term in a landslide, defeating Republican Whitehall City Attorney George C. Rogers by 27 percentage points.

== Democratic primary ==
=== Candidates ===
- Gertrude Walton Donahey, incumbent Ohio State Treasurer (1971–1983)

=== Campaign ===
Donahey won renomination unopposed.

=== Results ===
Democratic primary results
Party	Candidate	Votes	%
Democratic	Gertrude Walton Donahey	471,711	100.00%
Total votes		471,711	100.00%

== Republican primary ==
=== Candidates ===
- George C. Rogers, Whitehall City Attorney
- Richard H. Harris
- Sam Speck, Ohio State Senator (1977–1983)

=== Campaign ===
George C. Rogers narrowly won the Republican nomination by one percentage point over his closest opponent Richard H. Harris.

=== Results ===
Republican primary results
Party	Candidate	Votes	%
Republican	George C. Rogers	164,674	35.76%
Republican	Richard H. Harris	159,754	34.69%
Republican	Sam Speck	136,123	29.56%
Total votes		460,551	100.00%

== General election ==
=== Candidates ===
- Gertrude Walton Donahey, incumbent Ohio State Treasurer (1971–1983) (Democratic)
- George C. Rogers, Whitehall City Attorney (Republican)

=== Results ===
1978 Ohio State Treasurer election results
Party	Candidate	Votes	%	±%
Democratic	Gertrude Walton Donahey	1,639,317	63.51%	+0.35%
Republican	George C. Rogers	941,852	36.49%	−0.35%
Total votes		2,581,169	100.00%	
Democratic hold				
