= Senator Welsh =

Senator Welsh may refer to:

- Isaac Welsh (1811–1875), Ohio State Senate
- Joseph Welsh (born 1955), Iowa State Senate
- Matthew E. Welsh (1912–1995), Indiana State Senate
- Patrick T. Welsh (1950–2007), Maryland State Senate
