= Heman Allen =

Heman Allen may refer to:

- Heman Allen (of Cornwall) (1740–1778), Vermont patriot and brother of Ethan Allen
- Heman Allen (diplomat) (1779–1852), U.S. Representative from Colchester, Vermont (1817–1818), U.S. Minister Plenipotentiary to Chile
- Heman Allen (Vermont politician) (1777–1844), U.S. Representative from Milton, Vermont (1831–1839)

== See also ==
- Heman Allen Moore (1809–1844), U.S. Representative from Ohio
