= Charles C. Green =

Charles C. Green may refer to:

- Charles C. Green (Ohio politician) (1873–1940), American politician from Ohio
- C. C. Green, American politician from Arizona
