= William T. Cope =

American politician (1836–1902)

William Taylor Cope
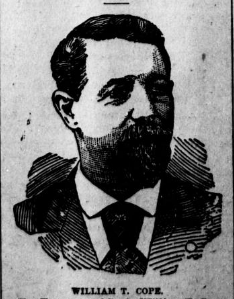

Ohio State Treasurer
- In office January 11, 1892 – January 13, 1896
- Governor: William McKinley
- Preceded by: John C. Brown
- Succeeded by: Samuel B. Campbell

Personal details
- Born: December 25, 1836 Columbiana County, Ohio
- Died: November 26, 1902 (aged 65) Columbus, Ohio
- Resting place: Green Lawn Cemetery
- Party: Republican

Military service
- Allegiance: United States
- Branch/service: Union Army
- Rank: Captain
- Unit: 143rd Ohio Infantry

William Taylor Cope (December 25, 1836 – November 26, 1902) was a Republican politician in the state of Ohio and was Ohio State Treasurer from 1892 to 1896.

William T. Cope was born in 1836 at Columbiana County, Ohio, and in his earlier years was a coal operator or merchant. During the American Civil War he was a captain in the 143rd Volunteer Infantry. He represented his county in the Ohio House of Representatives, winning elections in 1885 and 1887 to the 67th and 68th General Assemblies.

Cope then moved to Cleveland, Ohio, where he was a wholesale coal dealer. In 1891 and again in 1893, he was elected State Treasurer. Later he worked for a bank in Columbus. He died November 26, 1902, and is interred at Green Lawn Cemetery, Columbus, Ohio

== Notes ==
Political offices
Preceded by John C. Brown	Ohio State Treasurer; 1892–96	Succeeded by Samuel B. Campbell
Ohio House of Representatives
Preceded by George W. Love	Representative from Columbiana County; 1886–89	Succeeded by Alexander H. McCoy
