= Seth Walsh =

American politician (born 1990/1991)

- Walsh in 2026

Treasurer-elect of Ohio
- Assuming office January 11, 2027
- Governor: Amy Acton (elect)
- Succeeding: Robert Sprague

Member of the Cincinnati City Council
- Incumbent
- Assumed office December 19, 2022
- Preceded by: Greg Landsman

Personal details
- Born: 1990 or 1991 (age 35–36)
- Party: Democratic
- Education: Xavier University

Seth Walsh (born 1990/1991) is an American politician who is the Treasurer-elect of Ohio. A member of the Democratic Party, Walsh has served on the Cincinnati City Council since 2022.

Walsh is from St. Joseph, Michigan. He moved to Cincinnati to attend Xavier University. He served as student body president from 2012 to 2013.

Walsh was appointed to the Cincinnati City Council in December 2022 to replace Greg Landsman. He was reelected in 2025. Walsh ran for Ohio State Treasurer in the November 2026 elections and narrowly defeated Jay Edwards, the Republican nominee.

Party political offices
Preceded by Scott Schertzer	Democratic nominee for Treasurer of Ohio; 2026	Most recent
Political offices
Preceded by Robert Sprague	Treasurer of Ohio; Taking office 2027	Elect
