= Greenwood Cemetery (Hamilton, Ohio) =

Cemetery in Butler County, Ohio

- U.S. National Register of Historic Places
- U.S. Historic district
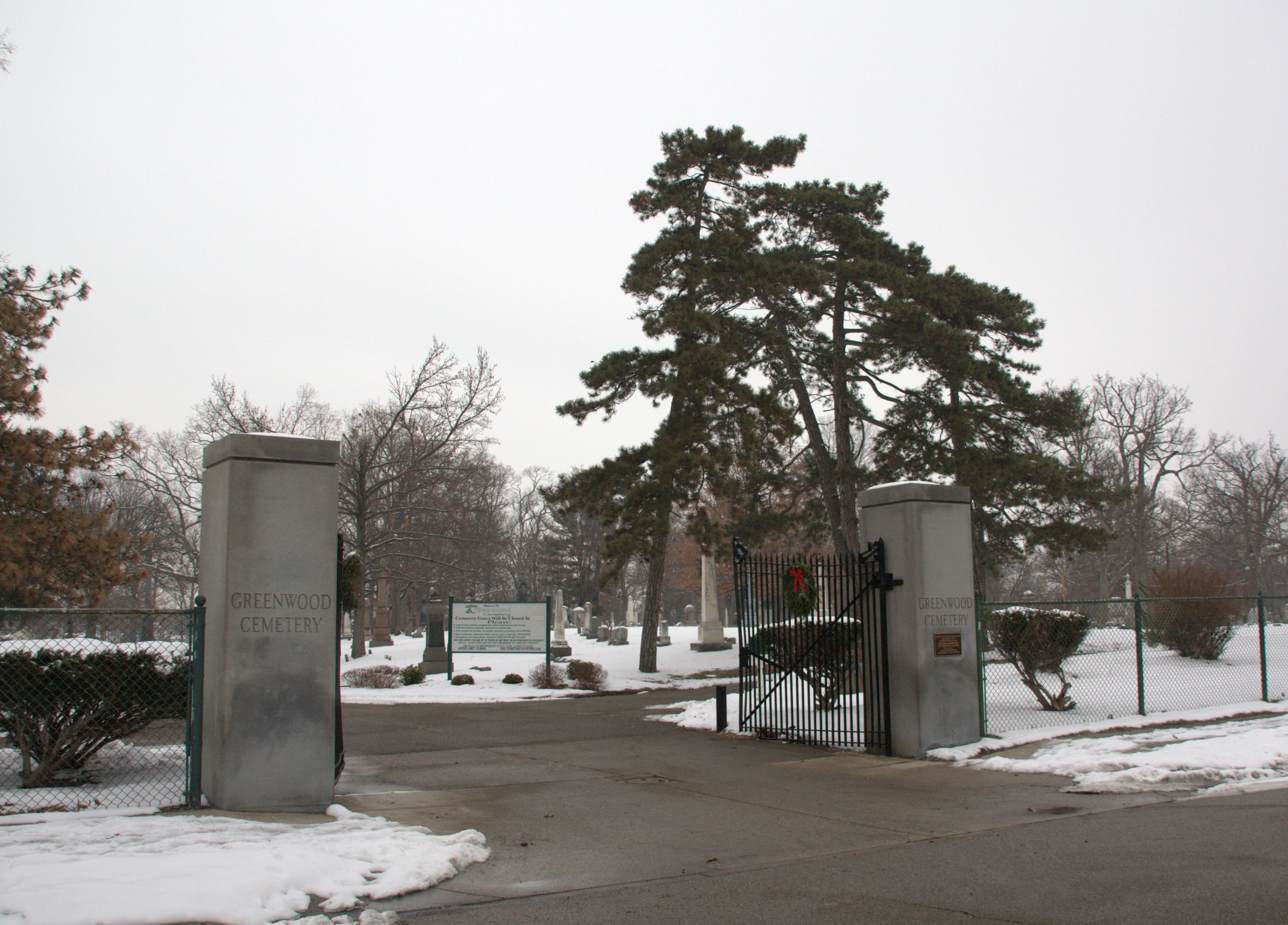

- Location within Ohio Location within the United States
- Location: Hamilton, Ohio
- Coordinates: 39°24′11″N 84°32′32″W
- Area: 695 acres (2.81 km^{2})
- Architectural style: Exotic Revival and Romanesque
- NRHP reference No.: 94000771
- Added to NRHP: 1994-07-22

Greenwood Cemetery is a registered historic district in Hamilton, Ohio, listed in the National Register of Historic Places on July 22, 1994. It contains 5 contributing buildings. Greenwood is designed in the style of a landscaped park and garden with mortuary art and statues among the graves.

== History ==
In 1848 the Greenwood Cemetery Association was created in order to establish a community cemetery. Land to create the cemetery was purchased from local resident David Bigham, and planned by Adolph Strauch. Greenwood Cemetery was modeled after Mount Auburn Cemetery in Boston and Spring Grove Cemetery in Cincinnati which had also been designed by Strauch.

== Prominent burials ==
- Raymond H. Burke, US Congressman, teacher, and businessman
- Lewis D. Campbell, US Congressman – over his political career he was elected as a Whig, Republican, Know Nothing, and Democrat, as well as colonel of the 69th Ohio Infantry during the Civil War
- Ray Combs, host of Family Feud
- Warren Gard, US Congressman, attorney, prosecutor, and jurist
- Samuel Herrick, US Congressman
- John M. Millikin, Republican politician and Ohio State Treasurer
- Henry Lee Morey, US Congressman and US Army Civil War officer
- James E. Neal, US Congressman and Speaker of the Ohio House of Representatives
- Robert M. Sohngen, lawyer and justice of the Supreme Court of Ohio 1947–1948
- Larry Troutman, Zapp lead singer
- Roger Troutman, founder of Zapp
- Elijah Vance, politician and Speaker of the Ohio Senate in 1835 and 1836.
- Ferdinand Van Derveer, Civil War Brigadier General
- S. S. Warner, Republican politician and Ohio State Treasurer from 1866–1871.
- John Woods, US Congressman
