= 2022 Ohio State Treasurer election =

- November 8, 2022
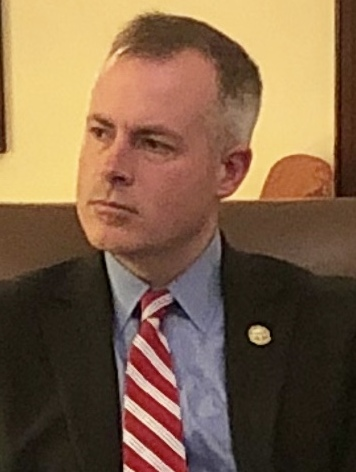

Candidate	Robert Sprague	Scott Schertzer
Party	Republican	Democratic
Popular vote	2,390,542	1,692,160
Percentage	58.55%	41.45%
- Sprague: 50–60% 60–70% 70–80% 80–90% Schertzer: 50–60% 60–70% 70–80%
State Treasurer before election
Robert Sprague
Republican
Elected State Treasurer
Robert Sprague
Republican

The 2022 Ohio State Treasurer election was held on November 8, 2022, to elect the Ohio State Treasurer, concurrently with elections to the United States Senate, U.S. House of Representatives, governor, and other state and local elections. Primary elections were held on May 3, 2022.

Incumbent Republican treasurer Robert Sprague ran for re-election to a second term in office against Marion mayor Scott Schertzer. Sprague comfortably won re-election, expanding on his 2018 margin of victory. During the campaign, Sprague led in fundraising against Schertzer.

== Republican primary ==
=== Candidates ===
==== Nominee ====
- Robert Sprague, incumbent state treasurer (2019-present)

Republican primary results
Party	Candidate	Votes	%
Republican	Robert Sprague (incumbent)	810,487	100.0%
Total votes		810,487	100.0%

== Democratic primary ==
=== Candidates ===
==== Nominee ====
- Scott Schertzer, mayor of Marion

=== Results ===
Democratic primary results
Party	Candidate	Votes	%
Democratic	Scott Schertzer	421,827	100.0%
Total votes		421,827	100.0%

== General election ==
=== Endorsements ===
Robert Sprague (R)

Executive branch officials

- Donald Trump, 45th President of the United States (2017-2021)

Organizations

- Ohio Republican Party
Scott Schertzer (D)

Newspapers and other media

- The Plain Dealer

Labor unions

- Ohio Education Association

Organizations

- Fraternal Order of Police of Ohio
- Ohio Democratic Party

=== Results ===
2022 Ohio State Treasurer election
Party	Candidate	Votes	%
Republican	Robert Sprague (incumbent)	2,390,542	58.55%
Democratic	Scott Schertzer	1,692,160	41.45%
Total votes		4,082,702	100.00%
Republican hold			

==== By congressional district ====
Sprague won 13 of 15 congressional districts, three of which elected Democrats.

District	Sprague	Schertzer	Representative
1st	52%	48%	Steve Chabot (117th Congress)
1st	52%	48%	Greg Landsman (118th Congress)
2nd	75%	25%	Brad Wenstrup
3rd	34%	66%	Joyce Beatty
4th	71%	29%	Jim Jordan
5th	68%	32%	Bob Latta
6th	67%	33%	Bill Johnson
7th	59%	41%	Bob Gibbs (117th Congress)
7th	59%	41%	Max Miller (118th Congress)
8th	66%	34%	Warren Davidson
9th	56%	44%	Marcy Kaptur
10th	57%	43%	Mike Turner
11th	25%	75%	Shontel Brown
12th	69%	31%	Troy Balderson
13th	53%	47%	Tim Ryan (117th Congress)
13th	53%	47%	Emilia Sykes (118th Congress)
14th	61%	39%	David Joyce
15th	58%	42%	Mike Carey
