= Elijah Vance =

American politician

Member of the Ohio Senate from the Butler County district
- In office December 1, 1834 – December 2, 1838
- Preceded by: Daniel Woodmansee
- Succeeded by: John Saylor

Personal details
- Born: February 1, 1801 Bel Air, Maryland, US
- Died: January 11, 1871 (aged 69) Hamilton, Ohio, US
- Resting place: Greenwood Cemetery (Hamilton, Ohio)
- Party: Democratic

Elijah Vance (February 1, 1801 – January 11, 1871) was a Democratic politician from Butler County, Ohio. He was Speaker of the Ohio Senate in 1835 and 1836.

== Biography ==
Elijah Vance was born at Bel Air, Maryland on February 1, 1801. He came to Ohio in 1816, and lived in Cincinnati. He moved to Lebanon, Ohio in 1821. He studied law under Francis Dunlavy, and was admitted to the bar in 1826. He moved to Hamilton, Butler County, Ohio and practiced law.

=== Ohio legislature ===
Vance was elected to the Ohio House of Representatives from Butler County for the 31st and 32nd General Assemblies, (1832 to 1834). He was elected to the Ohio Senate for the 33rd to 36th General Assemblies, (1834 to 1838). For the 34th and 35th Ohio General Assemblies, (1835 to 1837), he was President of the Ohio Senate.

=== Judicial career ===
Vance was Prosecuting Attorney of Butler County from 1839 to 1843, and was elected Common Pleas Judge in 1843. In 1850, he was a member of the State Constitutional Convention. He was prosecuting attorney again from 1865 to 1870. He was also a member of the local board of education, and a trustee of Miami University.

=== Death ===
Vance died January 11, 1871. He is buried at Greenwood Cemetery (Hamilton, Ohio).

== Notes ==
Ohio House of Representatives
Preceded by Taylor Webster; Jesse Corwin	Representative from Butler County; December 3, 1832-November 30, 1834; Served alongside: James Comstock	Succeeded by William B. Van Hook; V. D. Enyart
Ohio Senate
Preceded by Daniel Woodmansee	Senator from Butler County; December 1, 1834 - December 2, 1838	Succeeded by John Saylor
Preceded by Charles Anthony	President of the Ohio Senate; December 7, 1835 - December 3, 1837	Succeeded by George J. Smith
