= Lewis D. Campbell =

American politician (1811–1882)

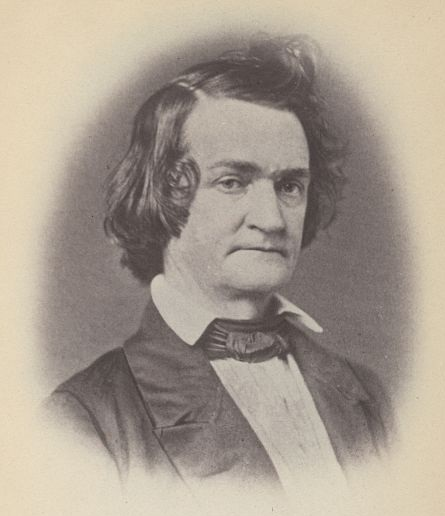

United States Minister to Mexico
- In office 1866–1867
- President: Andrew Johnson
- Preceded by: Robert W. Shufelt
- Succeeded by: Marcus Otterbourg

Member of the U.S. House of Representatives from Ohio
- In office March 4, 1849 – May 25, 1858
- Preceded by: David Fisher
- Succeeded by: Clement Vallandigham
- Constituency: 2nd district (1849-1853); 3rd district (1853-1858)
- In office March 4, 1871 – March 3, 1873
- Preceded by: Robert C. Schenck
- Succeeded by: John Quincy Smith
- Constituency: 3rd district

Member of the Ohio Senate
- In office 1869–1870

Personal details
- Born: Lewis Davis Campbell; August 9, 1811 Franklin, Ohio
- Died: November 26, 1882 (aged 71) Hamilton, Ohio
- Resting place: Greenwood Cemetery
- Party: Whig; Anti-Nebraska; Republican; Democratic
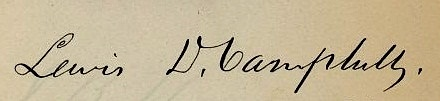
- Signature

Lewis Davis Campbell (August 9, 1811 – November 26, 1882) was an American politician as a U.S. representative for Ohio. Over his political career he was elected as a Whig, Republican, Know Nothing, and Democrat.

== Early life ==
Campbell was born in Franklin, Ohio. His education was in the local public schools. He was apprenticed to learn the art of printing from 1828 to 1831, and he was afterward assistant editor of the Cincinnati Gazette. He published a Henry Clay Whig newspaper in Hamilton, Ohio, from 1831 to 1835 (The Hamilton Intelligencer). Meanwhile, he read the law and was admitted to the bar in 1835. He practiced law in Hamilton until 1850, while he engaged in agricultural pursuits. He married Jane Reily on January 5, 1836, in Butler County, Ohio.

== Business ==
He was a director and secretary of the Hamilton and Rossville Hydraulic Company, formed in 1841 for the purpose of building a canal through Hamilton to provide water power to local companies. He was an incorporator and president of the Cincinnati, Hamilton and Dayton Railroad Company. The railroad was constructed between 1846 and 1852.

== Prewar politics ==
He ran unsuccessfully as a Whig candidate for election in 1840, 1842, and 1844 to the 27th, 28th, and 29th Congresses. He was elected as a Whig in 1848 from Ohio's 2nd District to the 31st Congress and was re-elected in 1850. Following redistricting after the 1850 census, he found himself in Ohio's 3rd District but was successful in being again elected as a Whig in 1852. With the collapse of the Whigs, he ran as an Anti-Nebraska candidate in 1854, and was elected to the 34th Congress. He became chairman of the powerful House Committee on Ways and Means.

During the debates on the Kansas-Nebraska Act in 1854, Campbell, a free-soiler, conducted a filibuster, provoking the ire of Henry A. Edmundson, a pro-slavery Virginia Democrat. On May 12, 1854, the tension boiled over. Historian Michael Morrison of Purdue University describes: "A filibuster led by Lewis D. Campbell, an Ohio free-soiler, nearly provoked the House into a war of more than words. Campbell, joined by other antislavery northerners, exchanged insults and invectives with southerners, neither side giving quarter. Weapons were brandished on the floor of the House. Finally, bumptiousness gave way to violence. Henry A. Edmundson, a Virginia Democrat, well oiled and well armed, had to be restrained from making a violent attack on Campbell. Only after the sergeant at arms arrested him, debate was cut off, and the House adjourned did the melee subside."

In 1856, he claimed re-election by a 19-vote margin and presented credentials as a Republican member-elect and served from March 4, 1857, to May 25, 1858, when, by a vote of 107–100, the Democrats controlled the House, which decided that Campbell was not entitled to his seat. His election had been successfully contested by Clement L. Vallandigham, who took his seat on May 26, 1858. Campbell ran against Vallandigham in the election of 1858; Vallandigham won 50.5% of the votes, Campbell 49.5%.

== Civil War ==
Campbell served in the Union Army as colonel of the 69th Regiment, Ohio Volunteer Infantry, in 1861 and 1862, when he resigned for his failing health.

== Postwar career ==
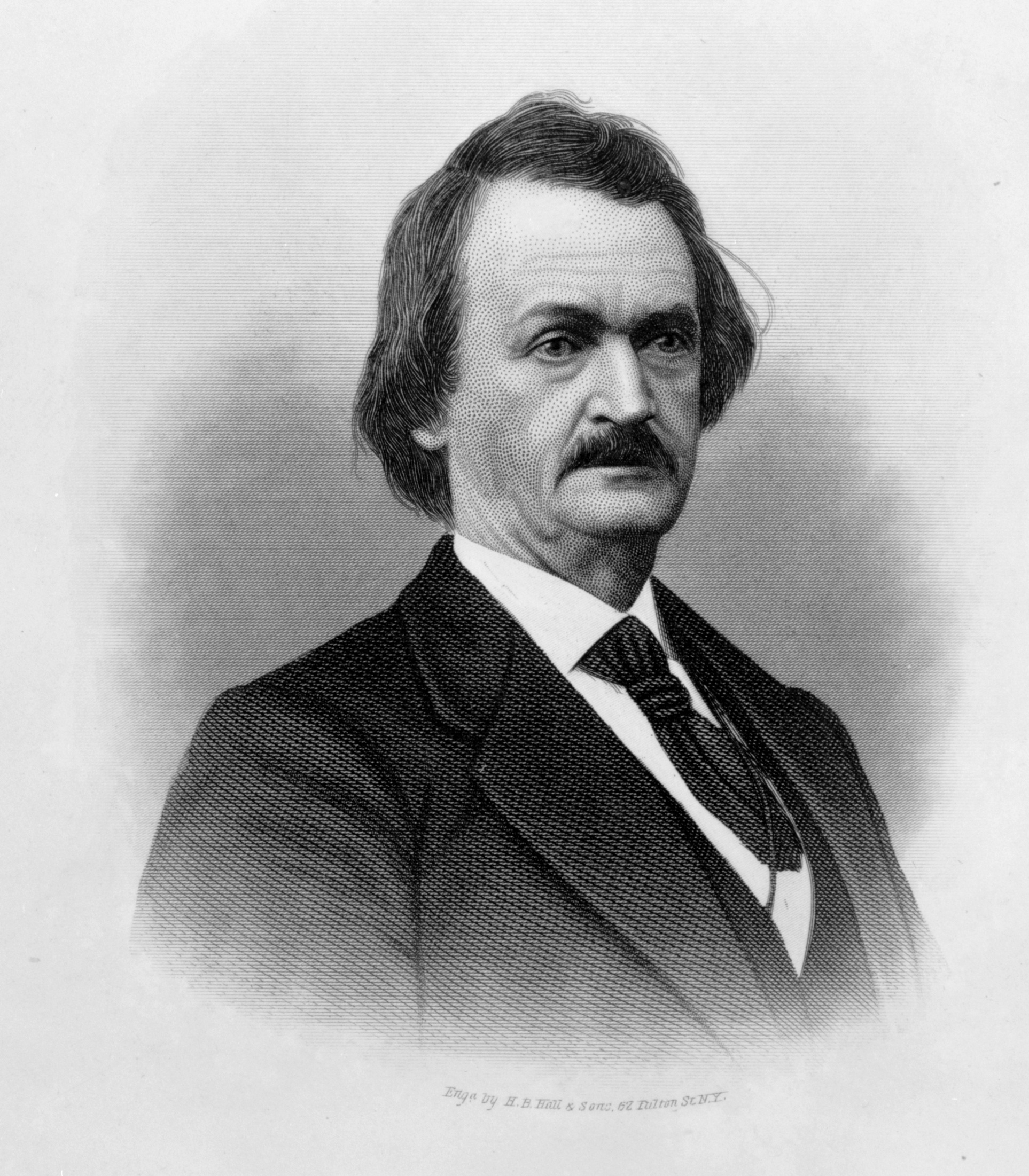
Engraving by H.B. Hall

President Andrew Johnson appointed Campbell as Envoy Extraordinary and Minister Plenipotentiary to Mexico on May 4, 1866. He was accompanied by General William Tecumseh Sherman. Campbell was instructed to tender to President Benito Juárez the moral support of the United States and to offer the use of American military force to aid in the restoration of law. The occupying French forces of Maximilian had Juarez's government on the run, and Campbell failed to reach them. Campbell served until June 16, 1867, when he resigned and returned to resume his elective political career.

=== Return to Congress ===
Campbell was elected to the Ohio Senate in 1869 and resigned in 1870 to take his seat in Congress, after being elected as a Democrat to the 42nd Congress. He declined to run for re-election in 1872. He was a delegate to the third Ohio State constitutional convention in 1873, and he resumed his agricultural pursuits.

== Death ==
Campbell died in Hamilton, Ohio, on November 26, 1882, at 71. He is interred in Greenwood Cemetery.

== Family ==
His nephew, James E. Campbell, later held the seat from the 3rd District for one term (1885-1887).

U.S. House of Representatives
| Preceded by David Fisher | Member of the U.S. House of Representatives from Ohio's 2nd congressional district 1849–1853 | Succeeded by John Scott Harrison |
| Preceded by Hiram Bell | Member of the U.S. House of Representatives from Ohio's 3rd congressional district 1853–1858 | Succeeded by Clement Vallandigham |
| Preceded by Robert C. Schenck | Member of the U.S. House of Representatives from Ohio's 3rd congressional district 1871–1872 | Succeeded by John Quincy Smith |
Diplomatic posts
| Preceded by Thomas Corwin | United States Ambassador to Mexico; 1866–1867 | Succeeded by Marcus Otterbourg |
Ohio Senate
| Preceded by William H. Campbell | Senator from 2nd District; January 3, 1870-January 2, 1871 | Succeeded by Durbin Ward |
