= William Hooper (Ohio businessman) =

State treasurer of Ohio (c. 1812–1894)

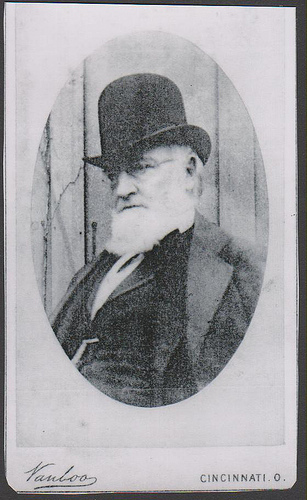
William Hooper

William Hooper (c. 1812 – July 18, 1894) was a Cincinnati businessman and politician. He was appointed state treasurer of Ohio following the resignation on September 25, 1865, of G. V. Dorsey, serving until January 1866 when S. S. Warner was sworn in.

After starting life as a clerk, by 1841 Hooper had become the teller of the Franklin National Bank. Around 1845 he went into the grocery business with L. B. Harrison as Harrison & Hooper, in a 20 by 60 foot storefront. The firm grew and became a successful regional wholesale dealer, but it failed in 1862 after the war caused the cutoff of sugar, molasses and other supplies from the South. In 1866 he became president of the Central National Bank of Cincinnati, founded in 1864, and later he was a director of the First National Bank of Cincinnati, of which his former partner L. B. Harrison was president for 32 years. Active in civic affairs, he served as president of the Cincinnati school board and as a trustee of Cincinnati College. At the start of the war he was a member of Cincinnati's defense committee, and took an active role in the construction of the artillery batteries guarding the city. He died in Greenwich, Connecticut on July 18, 1894, and is buried in Cincinnati. Toward the end of his life he was the president of the John Church Company, and the Hooper Building in Cincinnati, formerly the headquarters of that firm, is named after him.

Political offices
Preceded by G. V. Dorsey	Treasurer of Ohio; 1865–1866	Succeeded by S. S. Warner
