= William S. McKinnon =

American politician (1852–1908)

William Stranchon McKinnon
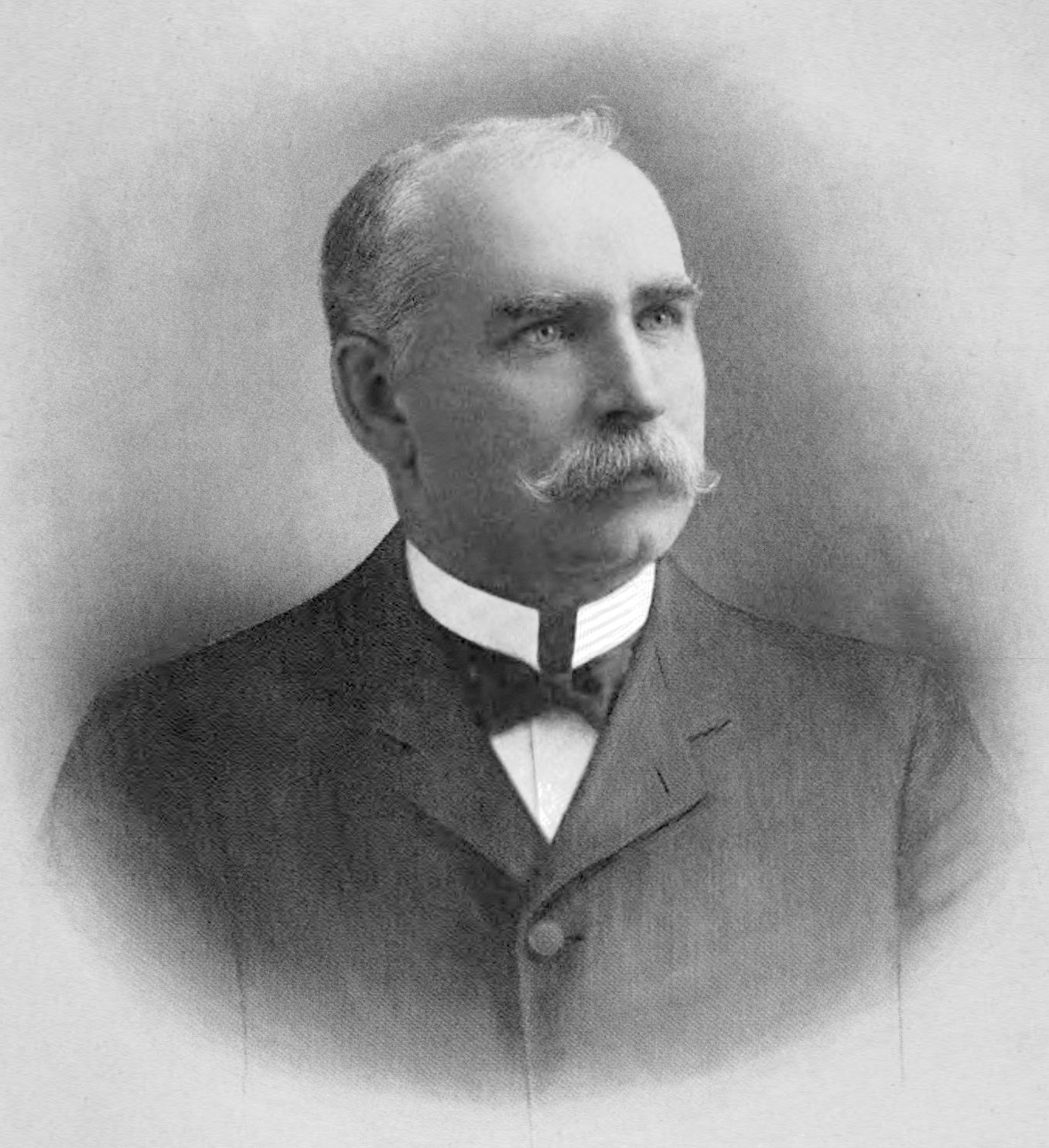

Ohio State Treasurer
- In office January 11, 1904 – November 17, 1908
- Governor: Myron T. Herrick; John M. Pattison; Andrew L. Harris
- Preceded by: Isaac B. Cameron
- Succeeded by: Charles C. Green

Member of the Ohio House of Representatives from the Ashtabula County district
- In office January 3, 1898 – January 3, 1904
- Preceded by: William S. Harris
- Succeeded by: B. W. Baldwin

Personal details
- Born: December 19, 1852 Owen Sound, Ontario
- Died: November 17, 1908 (aged 55) Ashtabula, Ohio
- Party: Republican
- Spouse: Octavia J. Porter
- Children: five
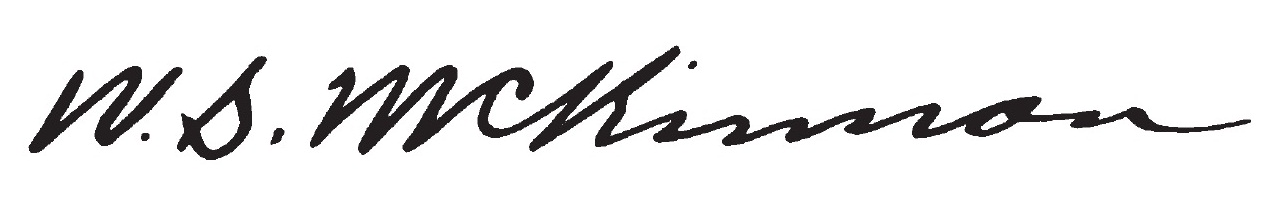
- Signature

William Stranchon McKinnon (December 19, 1852 – November 17, 1908) was a Republican politician in the U.S. state of Ohio who was Speaker of the Ohio House and Ohio State Treasurer from 1904 to 1908.

== Biography ==
William S. McKinnon was born at Owen Sound, Canada West. He was moved to Cleveland, where he grew up, and became a machinist.

McKinnon relocated to Ashtabula, where he owned machine shops, was a member of the Board of Education and city council and was Mayor of Ashtabula. He married Octavia J. Porter on April 2, 1878, and had four sons and one daughter. In 1880, he was the founder and head of the McKinnon Iron Works Company at Ashtabula Harbor.

McKinnon was elected to the Ohio House of Representatives in 1897 and served in the 73rd, 74th, and 75th General Assemblies, 1898–1903. In the 75th General Assembly (1902–1903), he was chosen Speaker of the House.

In May 1900, McKinnon was appointed an Ohio Commissioner of the Pan-American Exposition

In 1903, the Republicans nominated McKinnon for Ohio State Treasurer, and he won the election that year, and again in 1905. Elections were moved to even-numbered years, and McKinnon chose not to run in 1908. His term would have ended in January 1909, but he died at his Ashtabula home on November 17, 1908.

== Notes ==
Political offices
Preceded by Isaac B. Cameron	Ohio State Treasurer; 1904–1908	Succeeded by Charles C. Green
Ohio House of Representatives
Preceded by William S. Harris	Representative from Ashtabula County; 1898–1903	Succeeded by B. W. Baldwin
Ohio House of Representatives
Preceded by Arlington G. Reynolds	Speaker of the House; 1902–1903	Succeeded by George T. Thomas
