= Joseph Turney =

Joseph Turney (March 19, 1825 – July 29, 1892) was a Republican politician in the state of Ohio and was Ohio State Treasurer from 1880 to 1884.

Joseph Turney was born March 19, 1825, in New England. His parents moved to Cleveland, Ohio, in 1834. He first was a blacksmith, and later worked in railroads and banking. In 1865 and 1867 he was elected Treasurer of Cuyahoga county. In 1879 and again in 1881, he was elected on the Republican ticket as Treasurer of Ohio. Afterward, he returned to Cleveland, where he died several years later.

== Notes ==
Political offices
Preceded by Anthony Howells	Ohio State Treasurer; 1880–1884	Succeeded by Peter Brady
