= Jay Edwards (politician) =

American politician

Member of the Ohio House of Representatives from the 94th district
- In office January 3, 2017 – January 6, 2025
- Preceded by: Debbie Phillips
- Succeeded by: Kevin Ritter

Personal details
- Born: Nelsonville, Ohio, U.S.
- Party: Republican
- Education: Grantham University (attended); Ohio University (attended)

Jay Edwards is an American politician who served as a state representative in the Ohio House of Representatives for the 94th district from 2017 to 2025. A member of the Republican Party, he also served as Majority Whip of the Ohio House.

Edwards was the Republican nominee for Ohio State Treasurer in 2026.

== House Bill 6 scandal and repeal efforts ==
In 2019, Edwards voted in favor of House Bill 6 in the Ohio House; the bill passed 51–38 in what federal prosecutors later alleged was a $60 million racketeering scheme involving then-Speaker Larry Householder and his allies to secure its approval and provide a coal and nuclear bailout worth more than $1 billion.

Federal prosecutors later stated that approximately $60 million was directed through a nonprofit entity linked to Householder to support political activities, including efforts to elect candidates aligned with his leadership.

After the scandal became public, Edwards supported a partial rollback through House Bill 128 in 2021, which revised electric utility service law, repealed the nuclear bailout and related “decoupling” provisions of HB 6, and ordered refunds to customers, while leaving other subsidy provisions in place.

Subsequent repeal proposals, including House Bill 351 and Senate Bill 117 in the 134th General Assembly, were referred to committee but never received floor votes.

Reporting related to the House Bill 6 investigation examined communications involving Edwards. In 2022, the Ohio House declined to release text messages between Edwards and then-Speaker Larry Householder, citing exemptions under public records law during the ongoing criminal case. Edwards stated that he regularly communicated with Householder by text message and phone and that he deletes text messages that are not useful. News outlets also reported that Householder continued contacting lawmakers, including Edwards, after being charged.

Court filings related to the HB6 case also identified Edwards as “Representative 8” in an affidavit from an indicted lobbyist, according to local reporting. Edwards did not publicly comment on those claims at the time. Subsequent reporting on the broader HB6 investigation detailed the scope of recorded conversations and evidence gathered by federal investigators, though no criminal charges were filed against Edwards.

Additional reporting has also referenced Edwards in connection with broader public discussion of the House Bill 6 scandal. A documentary titled Ohio Confidential, part of the Max series Dark Money Game, examining the HB6 bribery case, included Edwards among current and former Ohio political figures appearing in the film. The documentary includes footage of Edwards and Householder having dinner with undercover FBI agents.

=== Vote on the Expulsion of Larry Householder ===
During the 134th Ohio General Assembly, Jay Edwards voted against the expulsion of former House Speaker Larry Householder, who had been federally indicted and later convicted in connection with the Ohio nuclear bribery scandal tied to House Bill 6. The Ohio House voted 75–21 to expel Householder, with Jay Edwards among the 21 Republican members who opposed the resolution.

According to local reporting, Edwards did not publicly explain his votes at the time, declining interview requests and not issuing a public statement addressing his position on Householder’s continued membership in the House while facing federal charges.

== Campaign contributions ==
Campaign finance filings from the Ohio Secretary of State show that the campaign committee of Jay Edwards received contributions from corporate and industry political action committees, including entities in the energy and utilities sectors, during the 2018 and 2019 reporting periods.

Filings indicate that FirstEnergy PAC made multiple contributions during this period, including $8,707.79 on January 25, 2018, $5,000 on November 5, 2018, $500 on April 25, 2019, $5,000 on June 18, 2019, and $1,000 on November 19, 2019.

Additional contributions were received from other energy and utility-related political action committees and industry groups, including American Electric Power, Dominion Energy, NiSource, Dayton Power and Light, Enbridge, EQT Corporation, NRG Energy, and the Ohio Oil and Gas Association, as well as from law firms and lobbying-related entities such as BakerHostetler and Kegler Brown Hill & Ritter.

House Bill 6, enacted in 2019, later became central to the Ohio nuclear bribery scandal investigation involving FirstEnergy and affiliated political organizations.

=== Later campaign activity and committee finances ===
Filings from the Ohio Secretary of State show that committees affiliated with Jay Edwards reported significantly higher overall fundraising and spending totals in later reporting cycles.

From 2020 through 2026, aggregated filings show approximately $1.45 million in total contributions and approximately $878,000 in total expenditures across Edwards-affiliated committees.

These filings include both itemized contributions and larger transfers from political committees and organizations, including transactions commonly associated with party committees and affiliated political funds as reported in Ohio Secretary of State campaign finance disclosures.

== Ohio House of Representatives ==
In 2016, Representative Debbie Phillips was term-limited and ineligible to run for a fifth term. A Democrat, Phillips had only faced one serious election in her four terms, in 2014, where she won by just over 100 votes. However, despite Athens County, the largest in the district, being considered reliably Democratic, Republicans had historically seen success in winning the district prior to Phillips' taking the seat. Democrats nonetheless fielded Sarah Grace, a small-business owner from Athens who was a newcomer to politics and a Democrat. Despite being considered the favorite, Edwards raised considerable money, albeit not without controversy. In the end, in what was a very good year for Republicans, Edwards defeated Grace by a 58% to 42% margin, taking the seat.

Edwards is the first Republican to hold the seat since Jimmy Stewart, who held the seat from 2003 to 2008.

In 2018, Edwards defeated Democrat Taylor Sappington to retain the seat.

In the 2020 general election, Edwards faced Democrat Katie O'Neill. Edwards was reelected in 2020, defeating Democrat Katie O’Neill in the general election.

In 2021, Edwards was the primary sponsor of a joint resolution proposing a constitutional amendment to prohibit non-citizens from voting in local elections. The measure was approved by the Ohio General Assembly and placed on the ballot as Issue 2, where it was approved by voters in the November 2022 general election.

=== Ethics and disclosures ===
Reporting by Signal Ohio found that Edwards disclosed more than 42 gifts worth at least $75 each in 2025, totaling at least $3,100. Edwards later stated that some of the listed gifts may not have been received, describing the disclosures as potentially overinclusive, while the filings themselves indicated the gifts were received.

In 2023, Edwards was censured by local members of the Ohio Republican Party following intra-party disputes, according to reporting by the Athens Messenger.

In 2024, Edwards expressed support for increased campaign finance transparency, stating that “we need to get rid of all of it” in reference to dark money in politics, despite being in an award winning HBO documentary detailing how he was investigated by the FBI.

== Ohio State Treasurer campaign ==
In 2025, Edwards announced his candidacy for Ohio State Treasurer, entering a crowded Republican primary for the open-seat race. His announcement followed the conclusion of his final term in the Ohio House of Representatives due to term limits. Edwards lost the race to Seth Walsh.

== Electoral history ==
Election results
Year	Office	Election	Votes for Edwards	%	Opponent	Party	Votes	%
2016	Ohio House of Representatives	General	28,649	57.80%	Sarah Grace	Democratic	20,897	42.20%
2018	Ohio House of Representatives	General	23,562	58.29%	Taylor Sappington	Democratic	16,855	41.71%
2020	Ohio House of Representatives	General	31,584	60.4%	Katie O’Neil	Democratic	20,719	39.6%
2022	Ohio House of Representatives	General	22,190	61.2%	Tanya Conrath	Democratic	14,084	38.8%

== Life and career ==
Edwards was born and raised in Nelsonville, Ohio, where he graduated from Nelsonville-York High School. After high school he attended nearby Ohio University on a football scholarship, where he studied mathematics. Edwards was previously a licensed realtor and supposedly is involved with work in medical sales within the drug treatment market.

Party political offices
Preceded by Robert Sprague	Republican nominee for Treasurer of Ohio; 2026	Most recent
