= Alfred P. Stone =

American politician

Alfred Parish Stone

Member of the U.S. House of Representatives from Ohio's 10th district
- In office October 8, 1844 – March 3, 1845
- Preceded by: Heman A. Moore
- Succeeded by: Columbus Delano

Ohio State Treasurer
- In office June 13, 1857 – January 13, 1862
- Appointed by: Salmon P. Chase
- Preceded by: William H. Gibson
- Succeeded by: G. V. Dorsey

Personal details
- Born: June 28, 1813 Worthington, Massachusetts
- Died: August 2, 1865 (aged 52) Columbus, Ohio
- Resting place: Forest Lawn Cemetery, Buffalo
- Party: Democratic, Republican
- Spouse: Anna Townsend

Alfred Parish Stone (June 28, 1813 – August 2, 1865) was a U.S. representative from Ohio.

== Biography ==
Born in Worthington, Massachusetts, Stone attended the common schools. He married Anna Townsend of Buffalo, New York. In 1832, he moved to Columbus, Ohio, and engaged in mercantile pursuits.

Stone was elected as a Democrat to the Twenty-eighth Congress to fill the vacancy caused by the death of Heman A. Moore and served from October 8, 1844, to March 3, 1845. He was not a candidate for renomination. He was appointed Ohio State Treasurer by Governor Salmon P. Chase in 1857 to fill the vacancy caused by the resignation of William H. Gibson. He was elected and reelected to the same office as a Republican and served until 1862. He was appointed as collector of internal revenue for the Columbus district of Ohio in 1862 and served until his death in Columbus, Ohio, August 2, 1865. Stone was found dead at the graves of his two children at Green Lawn Cemetery. He was interred in Green Lawn Cemetery. In 1888 his remains were removed to Forest Lawn Cemetery in Buffalo, New York.

== Notes ==
U.S. House of Representatives
Preceded by Heman A. Moore	Member of the U.S. House of Representatives from Ohio's 10th congressional district October 8, 1844-March 3, 1845	Succeeded by Columbus Delano
Political offices
Preceded by William Harvey Gibson	Treasurer of Ohio; 1857–1862	Succeeded by G. V. Dorsey
