= John C. Brown (Ohio politician) =

American politician

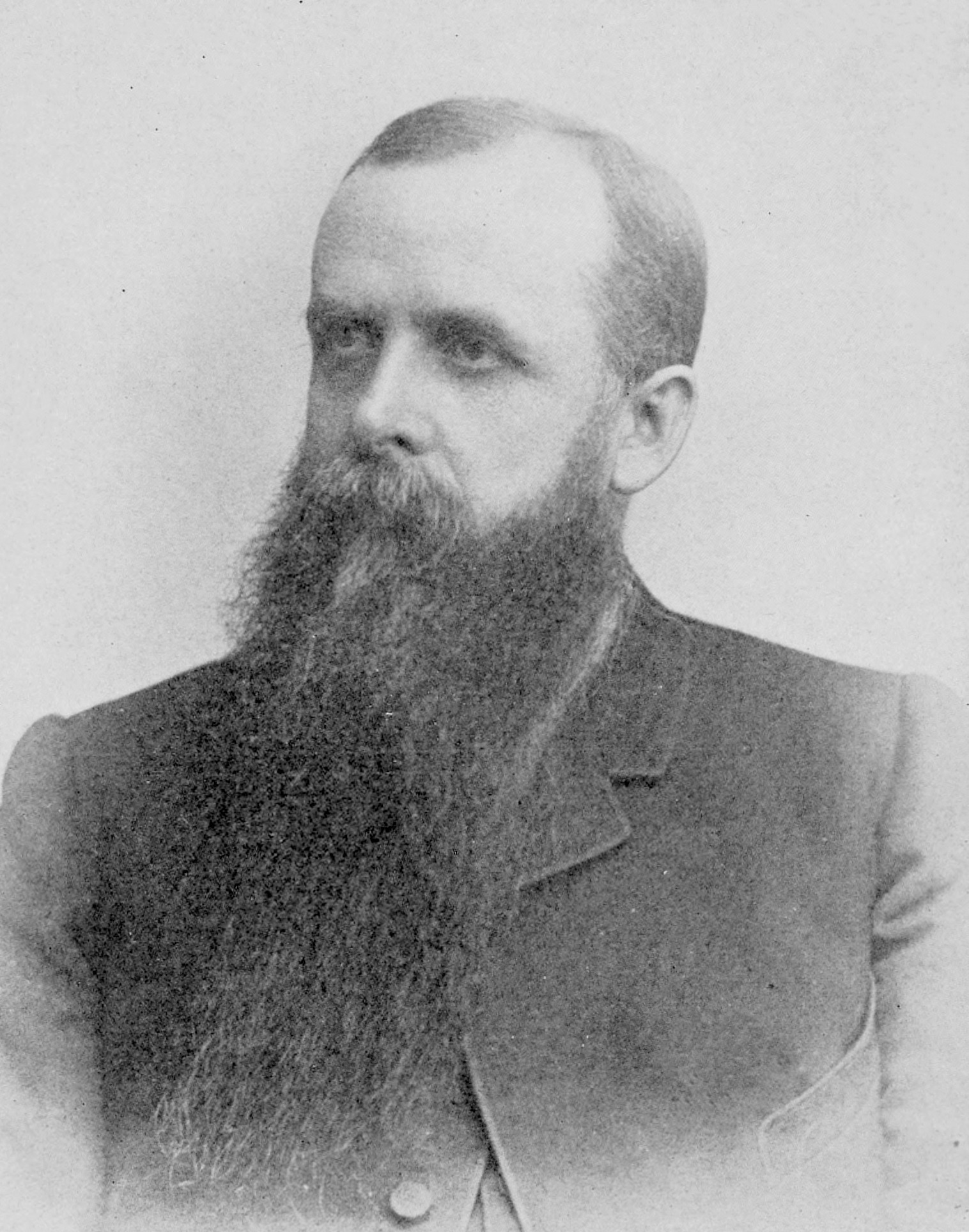

Ohio State Treasurer
- In office January 11, 1886 – January 11, 1892
- Governor: Joseph B. Foraker; James E. Campbell
- Preceded by: Peter Brady
- Succeeded by: William T. Cope

Personal details
- Born: March 13, 1844 Jefferson County, Ohio
- Died: November 22, 1900 (aged 56) Columbus, Ohio
- Resting place: Green Lawn Cemetery
- Party: Republican
- Spouse: Malona Glover
- Children: two

Military service
- Allegiance: United States
- Branch/service: Union Army
- Years of service: 1862–1864
- Unit: 52nd Ohio Infantry
- Battles/wars: American Civil War

John C. Brown (March 13, 1844 – November 22, 1900) was a Republican politician in the state of Ohio and was Ohio State Treasurer from 1886 to 1892.

John C. Brown was born on March 13, 1844, at Jefferson County, Ohio, and had not completed his public school education when the American Civil War broke out. He enlisted in Company E, Fifty-second Ohio Volunteer Infantry in 1862. His military career ended when he was injured at the Battle of Peachtree Creek and lost a leg July 19, 1864.

After returning from war, he engaged in business in Steubenville, Ohio, where he was elected Jefferson County Treasurer in 1867 and 1869. He resumed private business, and was elected County Treasurer again in 1875 and 1877. In 1881 he was president of Steubenville City Council.

In 1883 Brown was nominated by the Republican Party for Ohio State Treasurer, but lost the general election. In 1885, 1887 and 1889 he won election as Ohio State Treasurer. In 1896 he was appointed cashier by State Treasurer Campbell.

In 1885, Brown was married to Malona Glover of Jefferson County, and had one son and one daughter, who both survived him. He was a member of the Grand Army of the Republic, and the First Methodist Episcopal Church. He died November 22, 1900, and is interred at Green Lawn Cemetery, Columbus, Ohio
