= Charles C. Green (Ohio politician) =

American politician from Ohio

Charles Cameron Green
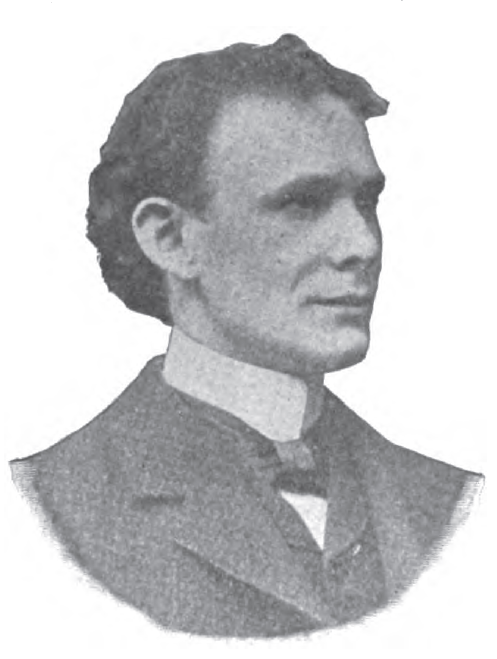

Ohio State Treasurer
- In office November 17, 1908 – January 11, 1909
- Appointed by: Andrew L. Harris
- Preceded by: William S. McKinnon
- Succeeded by: David S. Creamer

Personal details
- Born: April 6, 1873; Salineville, Ohio, US
- Died: September 7, 1940 (aged 67); Columbus, Ohio, US
- Political party: Republican
- Spouse: Florence J. Rose

Charles Cameron Green (April 6, 1873 – September 7, 1940) was a Republican politician in the U.S. state of Ohio appointed to fill the position of Ohio State Treasurer for a few weeks 1908–1909 after the incumbent died.

== Biography ==
Charles Cameron Green was born in Salineville, Ohio, in 1873. His father was accidentally killed September 1, 1877, and his mother, two siblings, and Charles removed to East Liverpool in that county, where the widow worked in a pottery to support the family and school them for a few years. Charles started working at age 12 in the office of Knowles, Taylor & Knowles Pottery Company in East Liverpool. He stayed for eight years, learning the various office duties.

Green left the pottery September 12, 1893 to attend school. He later served as chief clerk of the Boyce Foundry and Machine Works of East Liverpool, until becoming cashier of the Columbiana County Treasury, under Treasurer Isaac B. Cameron. Cameron was elected Ohio State Treasurer in 1899, and when his term began in 1900, he appointed Green to Cashier of the State Treasury. Cameron was re-elected in 1901. Green continued that position under William S. McKinnon, elected in 1903 and 1905.

A change in state law moved elections to even numbered years, extending McKinnon's term to January 1909. McKinnon chose not to run in 1908, and Green was nominated by the Republicans for State Treasurer. He lost the election, November 1908, to Democrat David S. Creamer by a margin of less than 2000, with more than one million votes cast.

McKinnon died November 17, 1908, and Green was appointed by Governor Andrew L. Harris to Ohio State Treasurer, serving until Creamer's term began January 1909.

Green died in 1940.

Green was married to Florence J. Rose of Canton, Ohio in 1900. He belonged to the B.P.O.E., I.O.O.F., and A.F.&A.M.

Political offices
Preceded by William S. McKinnon	Treasurer of Ohio; 1908–1909	Succeeded by David S. Creamer
