= Samuel B. Campbell =

American politician

Samuel Bonsall Campbell
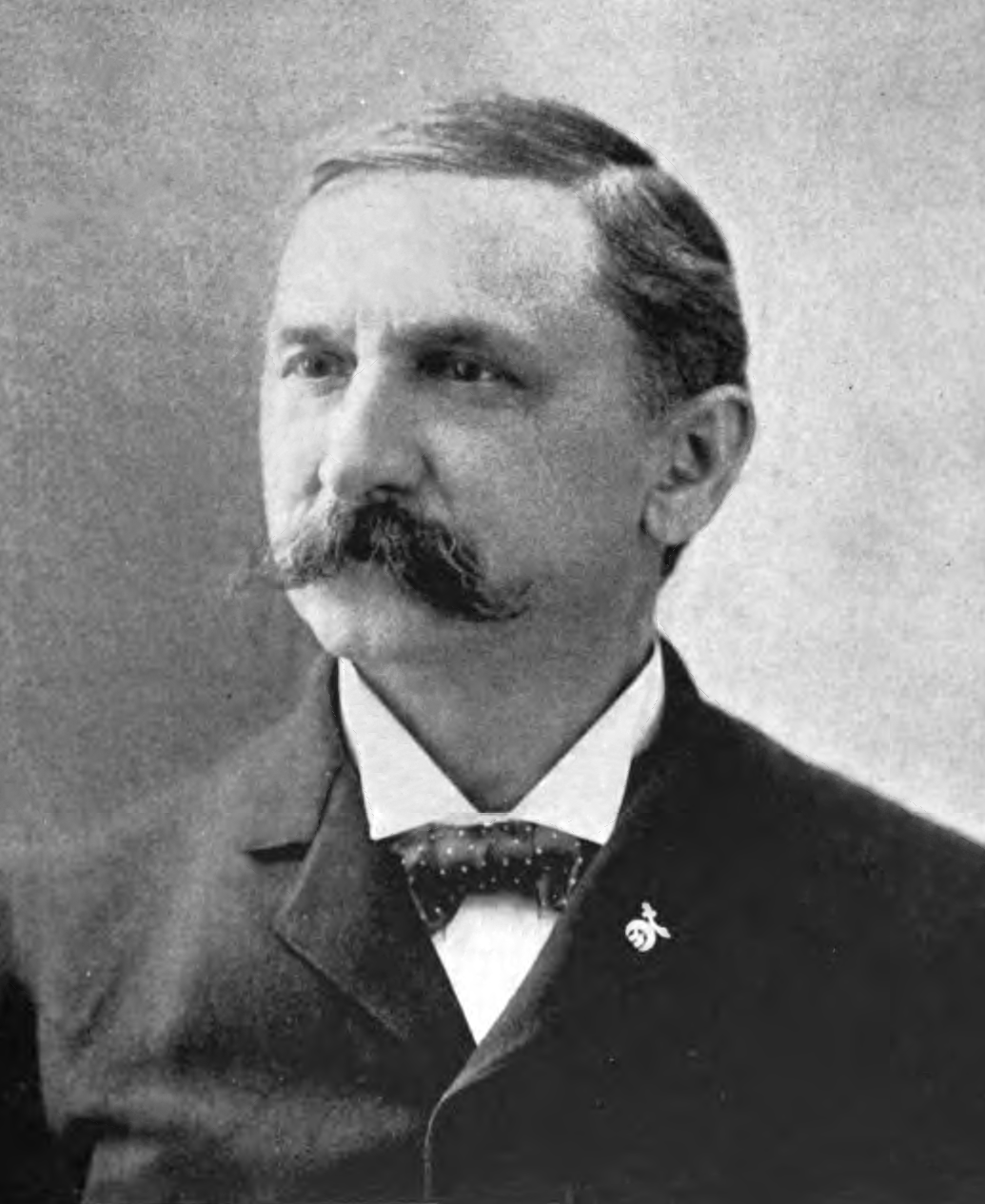

Ohio State Treasurer
- In office January 13, 1896 – January 8, 1900
- Governor: Asa S. Bushnell
- Preceded by: William T. Cope
- Succeeded by: Isaac B. Cameron

Personal details
- Born: July 2, 1846 Jefferson County, Ohio
- Died: May 30, 1917 (aged 70)
- Resting place: Green Lawn Cemetery
- Party: Republican

Military service
- Allegiance: United States
- Branch/service: Union Army
- Unit: 157th Ohio Infantry
- Battles/wars: American Civil War

Samuel Bonsall Campbell (July 2, 1846 – May 30, 1917) was a Republican politician in the state of Ohio and was Ohio State Treasurer from 1896 to 1900.

== Biography ==
Samuel B. Campbell was born July 2, 1846, at Jefferson County, Ohio, and attended public schools till age eleven, when he had to look after himself. He was a newsboy and clerk, and enlisted as soon as he was old enough when the American Civil War broke out. He enlisted in the One Hundred Fifty-seventh Ohio Volunteer Infantry Regiment. After the war he returned to Steubenville, Ohio, and was connected with the Miners and Mechanics Bank.

In 1879, he was elected County Treasurer, and re-elected in 1881. In 1886, he was appointed by John C. Brown as cashier at the State Treasury, and in 1892 became chief clerk under Ohio Secretary of State Christian L. Poorman.

In 1895, Campbell won election as Ohio State Treasurer and was re-elected in 1897.

Campbell died May 30, 1917, and was interred at Green Lawn Cemetery, Columbus, Ohio.
