= Anthony Howells =

American politician (1832–1915)

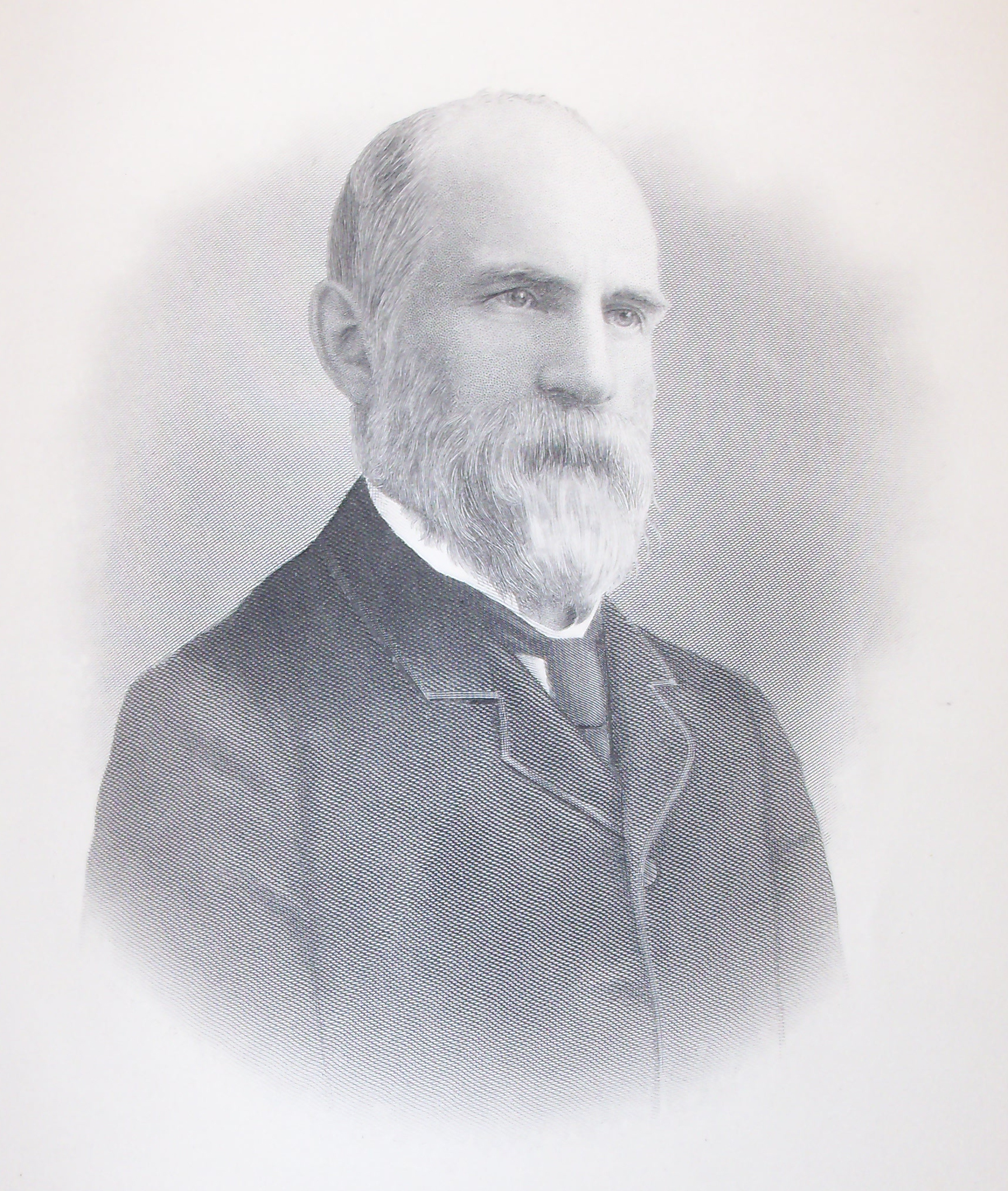
- Howells in 1904 publication

Ohio State Treasurer
- In office January 14, 1878 – January 12, 1880
- Governor: Richard M. Bishop
- Preceded by: John M. Millikin
- Succeeded by: Joseph Turney

Member of the Ohio Senate from the 21st district
- In office January 6, 1890 – January 3, 1892
- Preceded by: Thomas C. Snyder
- Succeeded by: Harvey J. Eckley

Personal details
- Born: April 6, 1832 Dowlais, Glamorganshire, Wales
- Died: November 17, 1915 (aged 83) Cleveland Heights, Ohio, U.S.
- Resting place: Massillon City Cemetery; Massillon, Ohio, U.S.
- Party: Democratic
- Spouse: Elizabeth James (m. 1854)
- Children: 4
- Occupation: Politician; businessman; coal miner
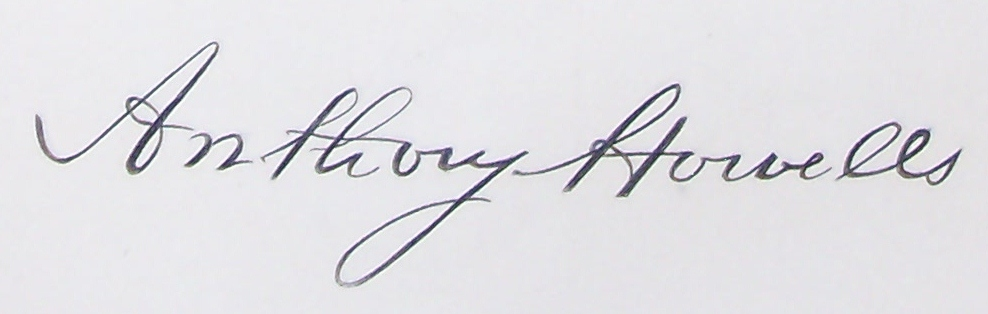
- Signature

Anthony Howells (April 6, 1832 – November 17, 1915) was a businessman and Democratic politician from the U.S. state of Ohio who was Ohio State Treasurer 1878–1880 and a state senator.

== Biography ==
Anthony Howells was born in 1832 at Dowlais, Glamorganshire, Wales. His father was superintendent of mines in that area. He attended the limited free schools of his town, and, at age 12, a private school in Llandybie, Carmarthenshire for one year. He then began working in the mines. At age 14 he was responsible for his own affairs, and decided the United States offered better prospects. He worked underground until age 18 in 1850, when he sailed to America, and moved immediately to Youngstown, Ohio.

In Youngstown, Howells resumed coal mining in the mines of David Tod, later Governor of Ohio. In the spring of 1853 he moved to California to mine, but returned to Youngstown the following spring, and worked in the mines until fall of 1855. Howells tired of mining, and opened a grocery and provision house, which continued until 1869, with the exception of the year 1865, when he engaged in coal mining in Du Quoin, Illinois. In 1869, Howells was offered an investment and management position of two mines in Massillon, Ohio. The Howells Coal Company ended up employing six hundred men.

Howell's first attempts at politics were Democratic nominations for treasurer of Mahoning County in 1866, and state senator in the ninth district in 1868. He lost both times in largely Republican districts. In 1875, he was a candidate for Ohio State Treasurer at the state convention but failed to receive the nomination. In 1877, he was nominated, and elected to a two-year term as state treasurer. He failed at re-election in 1879.

As reward for his party activity, Howells was appointed Postmaster of Massillon in 1886, but resigned after two years. In 1888 he was nominated a Presidential elector at the state convention, but the state went Republican. In 1889, he was elected to the Ohio State Senate for the twenty first district, Stark and Carroll counties, for the 1890–91 term. He lost his bid for re-election to his Republican opponent in 1891.

In 1893, Howells was appointed United States consul to Cardiff, Wales by President Cleveland, where he represented the government for four years. In 1901 he was nominated for Ohio Lieutenant Governor but lost the general election. He then retired from politics.

In 1901, Howells sold his mining company, and in 1902, began construction of the Hotel Courtland in Canton, Ohio, which was completed in 1905. He lived there for three years before moving to Cleveland, Ohio. He died at Cleveland Heights, Ohio, November 17, 1915, and was interred at the city cemetery in Massillon.

Howells was initiated to the I.O.O.F. in 1887 and Knights of Pythias in 1888. He also belonged to the Welsh Irorites. He was married to Elizabeth James in 1854 and had three sons and a daughter. Elizabeth died in 1890.

Political offices
Preceded by John M. Millikin	Treasurer of Ohio; 1878–1880	Succeeded by Joseph Turney
