= Peter Brady (politician) =

American politician

Ohio State Treasurer
- In office 1884–1886

Member of the Ohio House of Representatives
- In office 1882–1883

Personal details
- Born: Norwalk, Ohio

Peter Brady was an American politician. He was a Democratic politician in the U.S. State of Ohio and was Ohio State Treasurer from 1884–1886.

Peter Brady was born in Norwalk, Ohio, and came to Bellevue, Ohio when he was 19. He was in the hardware business there for 35 years, was one of the organizers of the Bellevue Industrial Savings and Loan Association, and operated the Bourdette Hotel for two years.

Brady was a member of Bellevue City Council, and was elected Mayor four times. He was elected to represent Sandusky County in the Ohio House of Representatives in 1882 and 1883 at the 65th General Assembly. In 1883, he was nominated by the Democrats for Ohio State Treasurer, and defeated Republican John C. Brown. He served a two-year term from January 1884 to January 1886. In the 1885 election, Brown defeated Brady.

Brady was a member of the B.P.O.E., and was married to Mina Gladys Smith, who was born in Iowa.

== See also ==
- Ohio State Treasurer

== Notes ==
Political offices
Preceded by Joseph Turney	Ohio State Treasurer; 1884–1886	Succeeded by John C. Brown
Ohio House of Representatives
Preceded by A. Dunham	Representative from Sandusky County; 1882–1883	Succeeded by J. R. Francisco
