= George T. Thomas =

American politician (1856–1920)

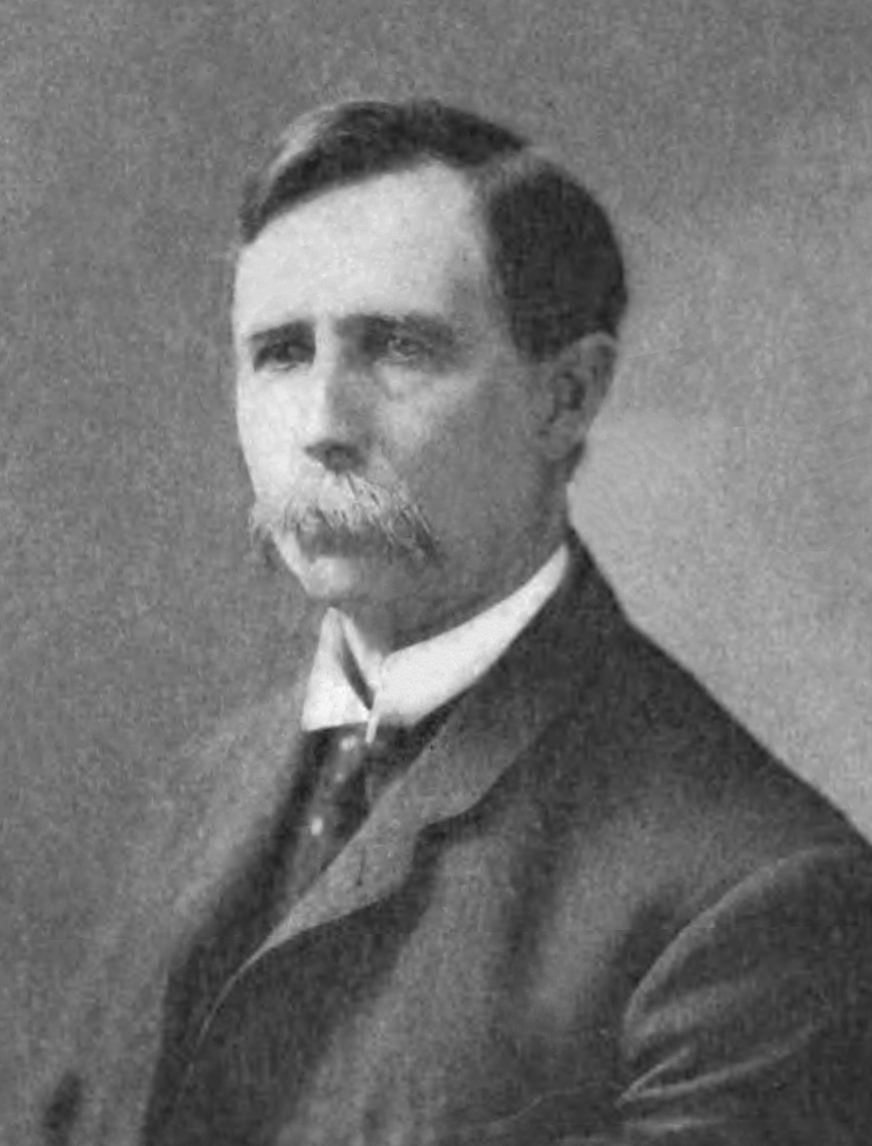

Member of the Ohio House of Representatives from the Huron County district
- In office January 1, 1900 – December 31, 1905
- Preceded by: David K. Strimple
- Succeeded by: F. W. Van Dusen

Personal details
- Born: September 11, 1856 Huron County, Ohio
- Died: August 30, 1920 (aged 63) Norwalk, Ohio
- Party: Republican
- Spouse: Emma J. Miller
- Children: one
- Education: Oberlin College; Buchtel College

George T. Thomas (1856–1920) was a Republican politician from Ohio in the United States. He was Speaker of the Ohio House of Representatives from 1904 to 1905.

== Biography ==
Thomas was born September 11, 1856, in Huron County, Ohio, and was brought up on a farm. He attended the local schools, Oberlin College, and Buchtel College, of Akron, Ohio. He taught at schools in Huron County, while living in Greenwich, where he was mayor in 1882.

In 1882, Thomas began study of law in the office of Skiles and Skiles of Shelby, Ohio, being admitted to the bar in 1886, and opening a law office in Norwalk, Ohio. He served two terms after being elected probate judge in 1890, returning to private practice in 1897.

In 1899, Thomas was elected to the Ohio House of Representatives as a Republican. He was elected to three two-year terms, and served as Speaker of the House during the last one, (1904–1905).

Thomas was married to Emma J. Miller of Fairfield Township, Huron County, Ohio, on April 10, 1880. They had a son, Alton O. Thomas, who also graduated from Buchtel College.

Thomas was a representative in the Grand Lodge of Odd Fellows of Ohio. He died of sepsis in 1920.

Ohio House of Representatives
Preceded by William S. McKinnon	Speaker of the Ohio House; 1904-1905	Succeeded by Carmi Thompson
