= G. V. Dorsey =

American physician

Godwin Volney Dorsey

Ohio State Treasurer
- In office January 14, 1862 – September 25, 1865
- Governor: David Tod; John Brough; Charles Anderson
- Preceded by: Alfred P. Stone
- Succeeded by: William Hooper

Personal details
- Born: November 17, 1812 Oxford, Ohio, US
- Died: May 15, 1885 (aged 72) Piqua, Ohio, US
- Resting place: Forest Hill Union Cemetery, Piqua
- Party: Democratic, Republican
- Education: Miami University; Ohio Medical College

Godwin Volney Dorsey (November 17, 1812 – May 15, 1885) was a Democrat and later Republican politician in the state of Ohio and was Ohio State Treasurer from 1862 to 1865.

Godwin Dorsey was born November 17, 1812, at Oxford, Butler County, Ohio. He graduated from Miami University, and from the Medical College of Ohio in 1836. He then settled in Piqua, Ohio.

Presidential elector in 1848 for Cass/Butler. He was a Democratic delegate to the 1850 Ohio Constitutional Convention, and a member of the Democratic National Convention in 1856. He was the Democratic nominee for the 4th congressional district in 1854, but lost with 30% of the vote. In 1856 he lost to Matthias H. Nichols by 245 votes for the same district. In 1859, he ran for Ohio State Auditor, but lost to Republican Robert Walker Tayler, Sr.

Dorsey was elected as Ohio State Treasurer as a Republican in 1861 and 1863 and was a member of the Republican National Convention in 1864. He resigned as Treasurer September 25, 1865. David Tod was Elector-at-large in 1868 for Grant/Colfax. He died before the meeting of electors, and was replaced by Dorsey.

He died in Piqua May 15, 1885.

== Notes ==
Political offices
| Preceded by Alfred P. Stone | Treasurer of Ohio; 1862–1865 | Succeeded by William Hooper |
