= Samson Mason =

American politician (1793–1869)

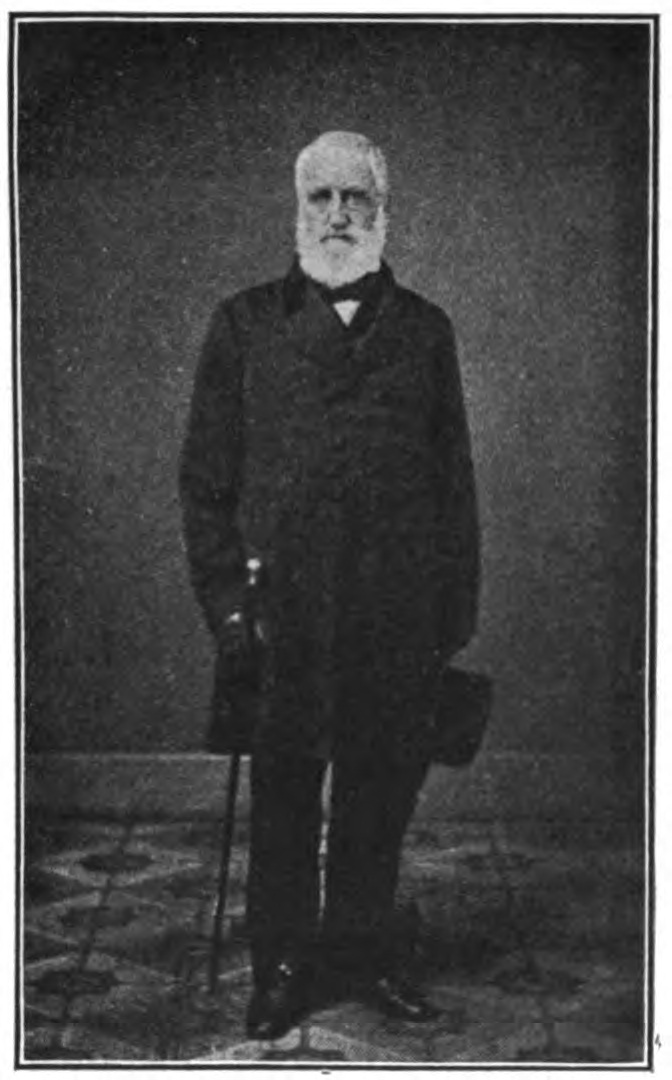

Member of the U.S. House of Representatives from Ohio's 10th district
- In office March 4, 1835 – March 3, 1843
- Preceded by: Joseph Vance
- Succeeded by: Heman A. Moore

Member of the Ohio Senate from the Clark & Champaign Counties district
- In office December 7, 1829 – December 4, 1831
- Preceded by: John Daugherty
- Succeeded by: A. M. Colwell

Member of the Ohio House of Representatives from the Champaign County district
- In office December 1, 1845 – December 6, 1846
- Preceded by: Ira H. Bean
- Succeeded by: S. B. Williams

Member of the Ohio Senate from the 11th district
- In office January 6, 1862 – January 3, 1864
- Preceded by: Richard A. Harrison
- Succeeded by: A. P. Howard

Personal details
- Born: July 24, 1793 Fort Ann, New York
- Died: February 1, 1869 (aged 75) Springfield, Ohio
- Party: Anti-Jacksonian
- Other political affiliations: Whig Party

Samson Mason (July 24, 1793 – February 1, 1869) was an American lawyer, jurist, and politician who served four terms as a U.S. representative from Ohio from 1835 to 1843.

== Biography ==
Born in Fort Ann, Washington County, New York, Mason attended the common schools in Onondaga, New York. He studied law. He was admitted to the bar and practiced in Springfield, Ohio.

=== Early career ===
He served as prosecuting attorney of Clark County in 1822. He served as a member of the State Senate from 1829 to 1831. He served as president judge of the court of common pleas in 1834.

=== Congress ===
Mason was elected as an Anti-Jacksonian to the Twenty-fourth Congress and reelected as a Whig to the three succeeding Congresses (March 4, 1835 – March 3, 1843). He served as chairman of the Committee on Revisal and Unfinished Business (Twenty-fifth Congress). He was not a candidate for renomination.

=== Later career ===
Mason was a Presidential elector in 1844 for Clay/Frelinghuysen. He served as a member of the state house of representatives in 1845 and 1846, and as United States Attorney for Ohio 1850-1853. He was a delegate to the Ohio constitutional convention in 1850 and served in the state senate from 1862 to 1864. He was also a captain to major general in the state militia.

=== Death and burial ===
He died in Springfield, Ohio, February 1, 1869, and was interred in Ferncliff Cemetery.

== Sources ==
- United States Congress. "Samson Mason (id: M000225)". Biographical Directory of the United States Congress.
- Taylor, William Alexander; Taylor, Aubrey Clarence (1899). Ohio statesmen and annals of progress: from the year 1788 to the year 1900 ... Vol. 1. State of Ohio. p. 255.

U.S. House of Representatives
Preceded by Joseph Vance	Member of the U.S. House of Representatives from Ohio's 10th congressional district March 4, 1835-March 3, 1843	Succeeded by Heman A. Moore
