= John M. Millikin =

American politician

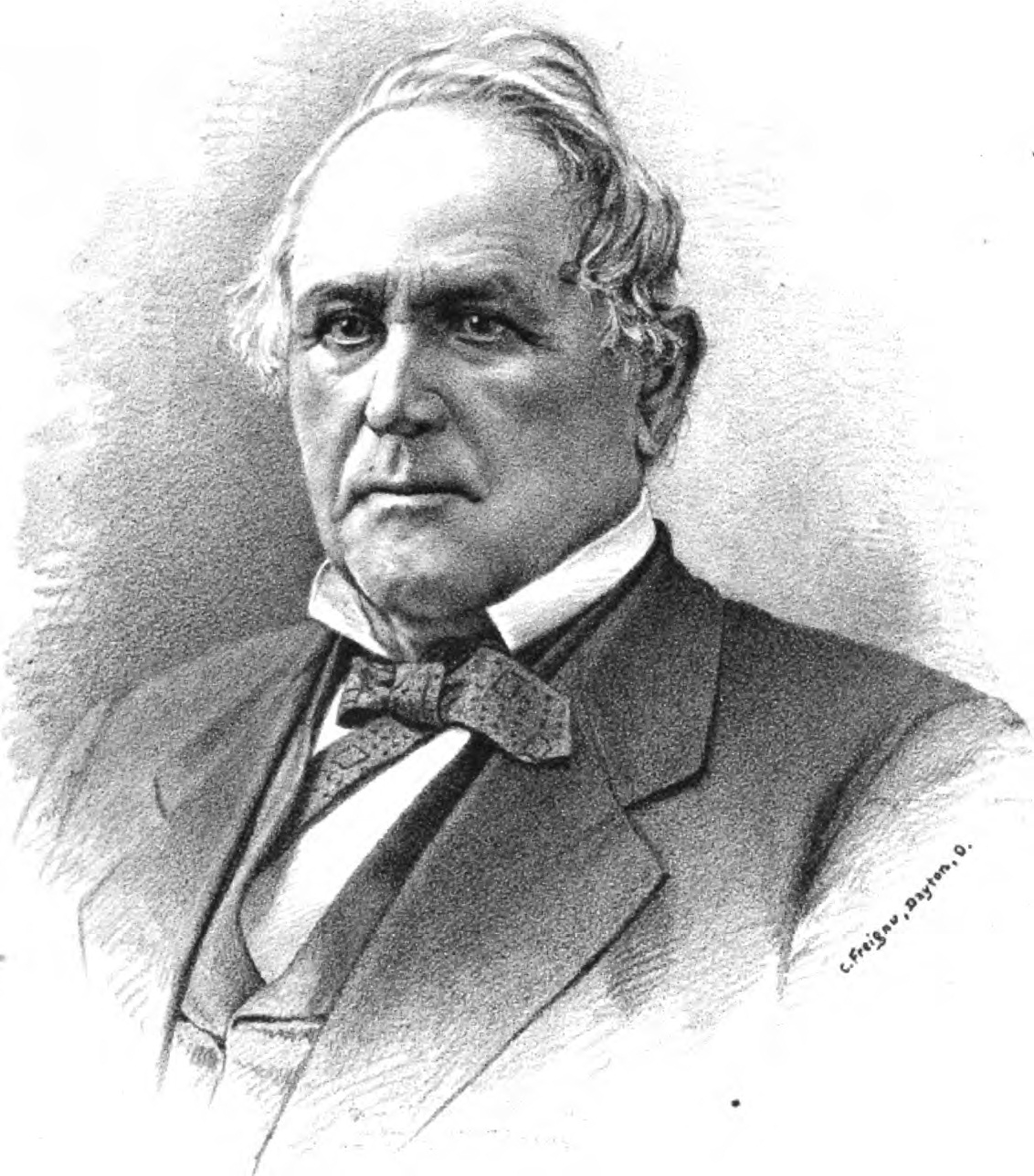

Ohio State Treasurer
- In office January 10, 1876 – January 14, 1878
- Governor: Rutherford B. Hayes; Thomas L. Young
- Preceded by: Leroy Welsh
- Succeeded by: Anthony Howells

Personal details
- Born: October 14, 1804 Greensboro, Pennsylvania, US
- Died: April 9, 1884 (aged 79) Hamilton, Ohio, US
- Resting place: Greenwood Cemetery
- Party: Republican
- Spouse: Mary Hough
- Children: four
- Education: Washington & Jefferson College
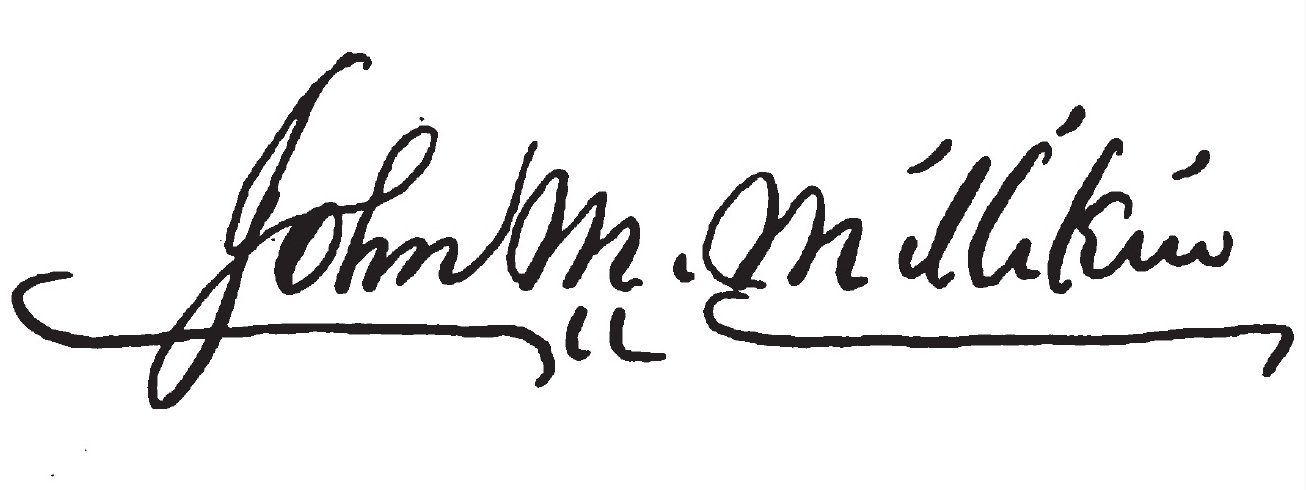
- Signature

John M. Millikin (October 14, 1804 – April 9, 1884) was a Republican politician in the state of Ohio and was Ohio State Treasurer from 1876 to 1878.

John Millikin was born on October 14, 1804, in Greensboro, Pennsylvania. Three years later, his family moved to Hamilton, Ohio, where his son, Daniel Millikin, became the first medical doctor in that place. He had private teachers and spent a year at Washington College in Washington County, Pennsylvania, from 1824 and 1825. He was admitted to the bar in Ohio on September 5, 1827, and went into partnership with William Bebb. When Bebb was elected governor, Millikin retired from legal practice and moved to his farm three miles from Hamilton. He raised Poland China domestic pigs, was the first president of the Ohio Poland-China Record Association, and was re-elected unanimously. He wrote the history of the breed.

Millikin was an officer in the State militia for several years and was on Governor Thomas Corwin's staff. In 1846, he was a member of the state board of equalization and spent three terms on the State Board of Agriculture. In 1860, he was named a trustee of Miami University for nine years and was re-appointed twice more, serving until his death. In 1873, he was named by the Secretary of the Interior as a commissioner to make a treaty with the Creek to cede part of their territory to the Seminole. In 1875, he was elected Ohio State Treasurer. He was re-nominated by the Republicans in 1877 but lost in the general election. He died April 9, 1884, at Hamilton. He was interred at Greenwood Cemetery (Hamilton, Ohio) on April 11, 1884.

Millikin was married to Mary Hough of Hamilton on September 6, 1831. They had four children.

== Notes ==
Political offices
Preceded by Leroy Welsh	Treasurer of Ohio; 1876–1878	Succeeded by Anthony Howells
