= Leroy Welsh =

American politician (1844–1879)

Ohio State Treasurer
- In office November 25, 1875 – January 1876
- Appointed by: William Allen
- Preceded by: Isaac Welsh
- Succeeded by: John M. Millikin

Personal details
- Born: March 1844 Beallsville, Ohio
- Died: August 20, 1879 (age 35) Belmont County, Ohio
- Party: Republican
- Education: Ohio Wesleyan University; Cincinnati Law School

Leroy Welsh (1844-1879) was a Republican politician appointed Ohio State Treasurer from 1875 to 1876.

== Early life ==
Leroy Welsh was born in Beallsville, Monroe County, Ohio, in March 1844.

He moved with his parents to Washington Township, Belmont County, Ohio, in 1854. Leroy Welsh was the son of Isaac Welsh, Ohio State Treasurer in 1871 and 1873. In 1869 he graduated from Ohio Wesleyan University and then studied law at home for a year before entering Cincinnati Law School, where he graduated in 1871.

== Career ==
He was chief assistant to his father at the Treasury beginning in 1872. When his father died on November 25, 1875, Governor Allen appointed Leroy Welsh to serve the remaining weeks of his father's second term. He returned home to Belmont County, Ohio, early in 1876 when his term ended.

Welsh practiced in Belmont County and later opened a law office in Columbus.

== Personal life ==
Walsh returned home to Belmont County when he fell ill. He died August 20, 1879, in Belmont County.

Political offices
Preceded by Isaac Welsh	Treasurer of Ohio; 1875–1876	Succeeded by John M. Millikin
