= Isaac B. Cameron =

Former Ohio State Treasurer

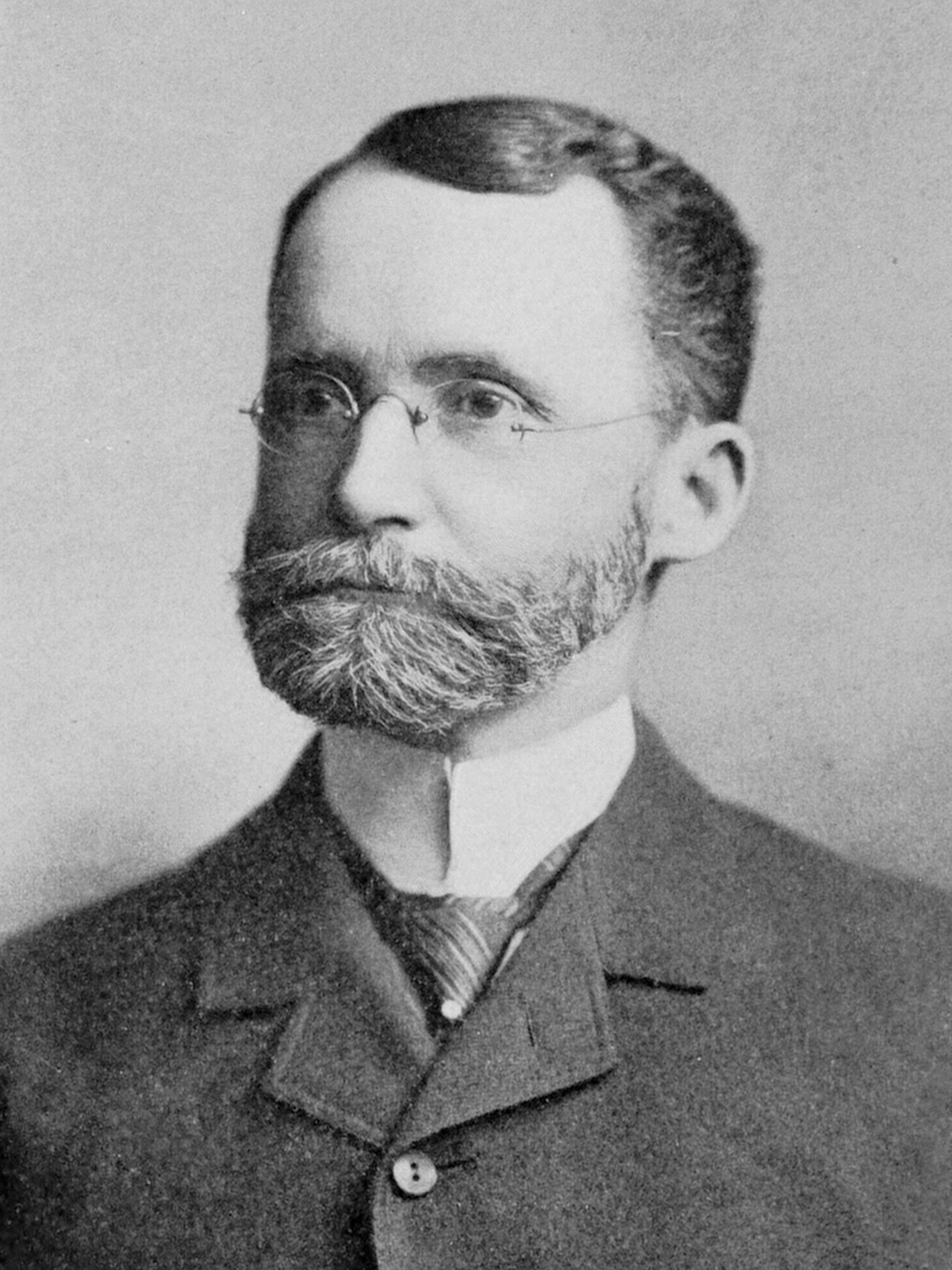

Ohio State Treasurer
- In office January 8, 1900 – January 11, 1904
- Governor: George K. Nash
- Preceded by: Samuel B. Campbell
- Succeeded by: William S. McKinnon

Personal details
- Born: June 15, 1851 Nairn, Scotland
- Died: October 11, 1930 (aged 79) Bexley, Ohio, United States
- Resting place: Green Lawn Cemetery
- Party: Republican
- Spouse: Laura A. Irwin
- Children: One
- Education: Iron City Business College

Isaac B. Cameron (June 15, 1851 – October 11, 1930) was a Republican politician in the U.S. state of Ohio who was Ohio State Treasurer from 1900 to 1904.

Isaac Cameron was born in Nairn, Scotland in 1851. When he was an infant, his widowed mother moved with the family to a farm in Jefferson County, Ohio near Salineville. In 1855, the family moved to Salineville. Cameron attended public schools, and graduated from Iron City Business College of Pittsburgh. He acted as bookkeeper for a Lisbon firm until 1874, then was a partner and then sole proprietor of a business from 1880 to 1893.

In 1893, Cameron was elected Treasurer of Columbiana County, and re-elected in 1895. For about a year, in 1898, he was Receiver of the bankrupt First National Bank at Lisbon. In 1899, he was nominated by the Republicans for Ohio State Treasurer, and won election. He won re-election in 1901. After his second term, he was chosen as president of the Columbus Savings and Trust Company. He died October 11, 1930, and is interred at Green Lawn Cemetery, Columbus, Ohio

Cameron was a thirty-second degree Mason, a Knight Templar, a member of the I.O.O.F., a Knights of Pythias, and an Elk. In 1875, he married Laura A. Irwin of Cleveland, Ohio, and had a son, Roy MacDonald Cameron, born in 1883. He was a Presbyterian by faith.

== Notes ==
Political offices
Preceded by Samuel B. Campbell	Ohio State Treasurer; 1900–1904	Succeeded by William S. McKinnon
