= Isaac Welsh =

American politician

Ohio State Treasurer
- In office January 8, 1872 – November 25, 1875
- Governor: Edward F. Noyes; William Allen
- Preceded by: S. S. Warner
- Succeeded by: Leroy Welsh

Member of the Ohio Senate from the 20th district
- In office January 6, 1862 – January 4, 1864
- Preceded by: Marshall McCall
- Succeeded by: John C. Jamison

Member of the Ohio House of Representatives from the Belmont County district
- In office January 4, 1858 – January 5, 1862
- Preceded by: James N. Turner; Robert Hamilton
- Succeeded by: Wilson S. Kennon

Personal details
- Born: July 20, 1811 Belmont County, Ohio
- Died: November 25, 1875 (aged 64) Belmont County, Ohio
- Party: Republican
- Other political affiliations: Whig
- Spouse: Mary A. Armstrong
- Children: Isaac Welsh

Isaac Welsh (July 20, 1811 – November 25, 1875) was a Republican politician in the state of Ohio who was in the Ohio House of Representatives, Ohio Senate, and was Ohio State Treasurer from 1872 until his death in 1875, when he was replaced by his son.

Isaac Welsh was born July 20, 1811, in Belmont County, Ohio. He was raised on a farm, and had little formal education. As an adult, he moved to Beallsville in Monroe County, and was in merchandising, but soon returned to Belmont. He was a Whig until that party collapsed.

In 1857, and 1859, he was elected to the Ohio House of Representatives for the 53rd and 54th General Assembly as a Republican. In 1861, he was elected from the 20th District to the Ohio Senate in the 55th General Assembly. Presidential elector for Grant/Colfax in 1868

Welsh was elected state treasurer in 1871, and again in 1873. He died November 25, 1875, and his son Leroy Welsh was appointed to serve the remaining weeks of his second term.

Welsh was married to Mary A. Armstrong of Belmont County.

Welsh was a Presbyterian.

Welsh died at his home at Washington Township, Belmont County, Ohio.

== Notes ==
Political offices
Preceded by S. S. Warner	Treasurer of Ohio; 1872–1875	Succeeded by Leroy Welsh
