= S. S. Warner =

American politician

Sidney Sardus Warner
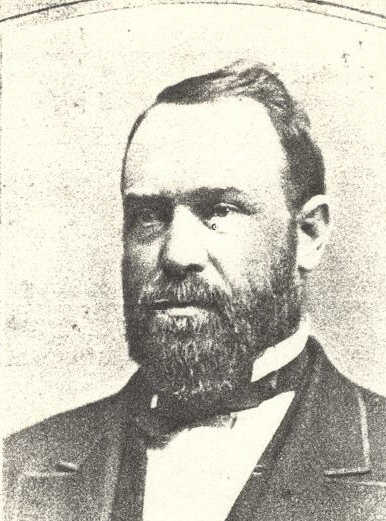

Ohio State Treasurer
- In office 1866–1871
- Governor: Jacob D. Cox; Rutherford B. Hayes
- Preceded by: William Hooper
- Succeeded by: Isaac Welsh

Member of the Ohio House of Representatives from the Lorain County district
- In office January 6, 1862 – December 31, 1865
- Preceded by: Walter F. Herrick, John M. Vincent
- Succeeded by: Washington W. Boynton

Personal details
- Born: April 17, 1829 Suffield, Connecticut
- Died: July 6, 1908 (aged 79) Wellington, Ohio
- Resting place: Greenwood Cemetery, Wellington, Ohio
- Party: Republican
- Spouse: Margaret A. Bradner
- Children: 4

Sidney Sardus Warner (April 17, 1829 – July 6, 1908) was a Republican politician in the state of Ohio and was Ohio State Treasurer from 1866 to 1871.

== Background ==
S S Warner was born April 17, 1829, at Suffield, Connecticut. In his youth, he resided in Mantua, Portage County, Ohio, and later in Lorain County, Ohio. In 1851, Warner married Margaret A. Bradner of Lorain County. The couple had four children.

Over the course of his career, he was elected to the Ohio House of Representatives in 1861 and to the 55th and 56th General Assemblies in 1863. Warner was elected in 1865, 1867, and 1869 as Ohio State Treasurer, and would later be nominated for governor and representative to Congress. He was also a banker and manufacturer in Wellington, Ohio. He was a presidential elector for Garfield/Arthur in 1880.

He died July 6, 1908, in Wellington, and was buried in Greenwood Cemetery, Wellington, Ohio.

== Notes ==
Political offices
Preceded by William Hooper	Treasurer of Ohio; 1866–1871	Succeeded by Isaac Welsh
