= Heman A. Moore =

American politician

Member of the U.S. House of Representatives from Ohio's 10th district
- In office March 4, 1843 – April 3, 1844
- Preceded by: Samson Mason
- Succeeded by: Alfred P. Stone

Personal details
- Born: Heman Allen Moore; August 27, 1809 Plainfield, Vermont
- Died: April 3, 1844 (aged 34) Columbus, Ohio
- Resting place: Green Lawn Cemetery; Columbus, Ohio
- Party: Democratic

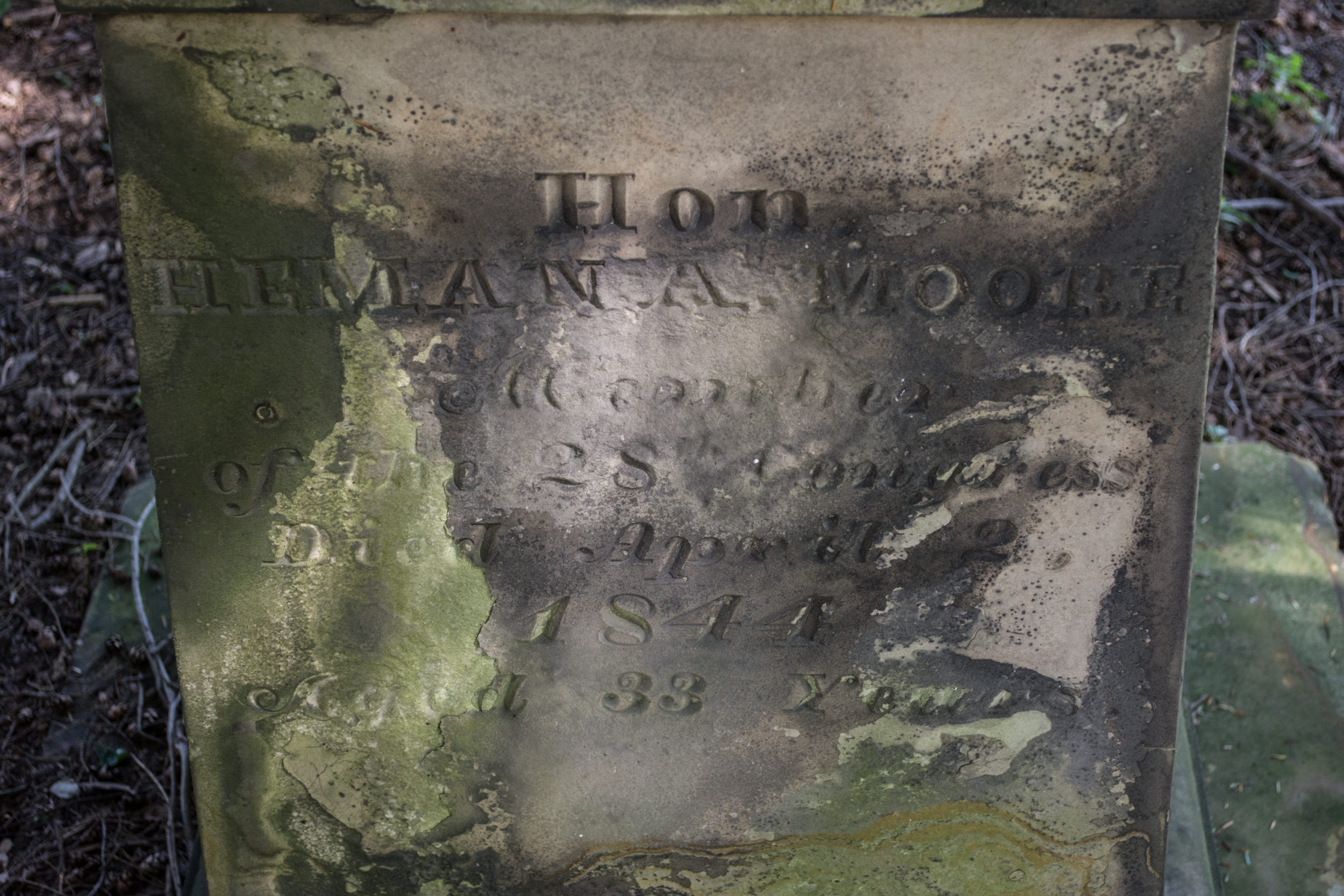
Heman Allen Moore grave, Green Lawn Cemetery

Heman Allen Moore (August 27, 1809 – April 3, 1844) was an American lawyer and politician who served as a U.S. representative from Ohio. He was elected to one-term in 1842, serving 13 months in office before his death.

== Biography ==
Born in Plainfield, Washington County, Vermont, Moore pursued an academic course. He studied law in Rochester, New York and was admitted to the bar, commencing practice in Columbus, Ohio.

=== Congress ===
Moore was elected as a Democrat to the Twenty-eighth Congress and served from March 4, 1843, until his death.

Alfred P. Stone was elected to fill out his term.

=== Death and burial ===
He died in Columbus, Ohio on April 3, 1844. He was interred in Green Lawn Cemetery.

== See also ==
- Politics of Ohio
- List of members of the United States Congress who died in office (1790–1899)

U.S. House of Representatives
| Preceded by Samson Mason | Member of the U.S. House of Representatives from Ohio's 10th congressional district March 4, 1843-April 3, 1844 | Succeeded by Alfred P. Stone |
