= 143rd Ohio Infantry Regiment =

- Active: May 12, 1864, to September 13, 1864
- Country: United States
- Allegiance: Union
- Branch: Union Army
- Type: Infantry

The 143rd Ohio Infantry Regiment, sometimes 143rd Ohio Volunteer Infantry (or 143rd OVI) was an infantry regiment in the Union Army during the American Civil War.

== Service ==
The 143rd Ohio Infantry was organized at Camp Chase in Columbus, Ohio, and mustered in May 12, 1864, for 100 days service under the command of Colonel William H. Vodrey.

The regiment left Ohio for Washington, D.C., May 15. Served guard duty at Fort Slemmer, Fort Totten, Fort Slocum, and Fort Stevens, attached to 1st Brigade, Haskins' Division, XXII Corps, until June 8. Moved to White House Landing June 8, then to Bermuda Hundred. Assigned to 1st Brigade, 3rd Division, X Corps, Army of the James. Served duty in the trenches at Bermuda Hundred, City Point, and Fort Pocahontas until August 29.

The 143rd Ohio Infantry mustered out of service September 13, 1864, at Camp Chase.

== Ohio National Guard ==
Over 35,000 Ohio National Guardsmen were federalized and organized into regiments for 100 days service in May 1864. Shipped to the Eastern Theater, they were designed to be placed in "safe" rear areas to protect railroads and supply points, thereby freeing regular troops for Lt. Gen. Ulysses S. Grant’s push on the Confederate capital of Richmond, Virginia. As events transpired, many units found themselves in combat, stationed in the path of Confederate Gen. Jubal Early’s veteran Army of the Valley during its famed Valley Campaigns of 1864. Ohio Guard units met the battle-tested foe head on and helped blunt the Confederate offensive thereby saving Washington, D.C., from capture. Ohio National Guard units participated in the battles of Monacacy, Fort Stevens, Harpers Ferry, and in the siege of Petersburg.

== Casualties ==
The regiment lost 32 enlisted men during service, all due to disease. Private James M Roudebush died 23 Jul 1864

== Commanders ==
- Colonel William H. Vodrey

== See also ==
- List of Ohio Civil War units
- Ohio in the Civil War
