= Robert Sprague =

American politician (born 1973)

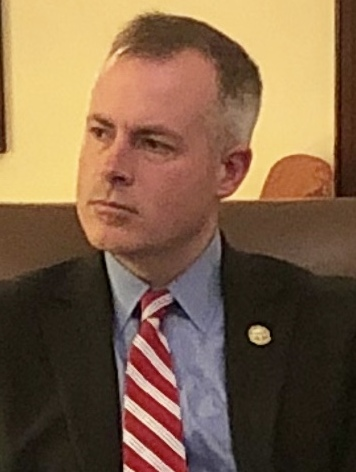
- Sprague in 2014

49th Treasurer of Ohio
- Incumbent
- Assumed office January 14, 2019
- Governor: Mike DeWine
- Preceded by: Josh Mandel

Member of the Ohio House of Representatives from the 83rd district
- In office February 1, 2011 – December 31, 2018
- Preceded by: Cliff Hite
- Succeeded by: Jon Cross

Personal details
- Born: Robert Cole Sprague; April 18, 1973 (age 53) Findlay, Ohio, U.S.
- Party: Republican
- Spouse: Amanda Sprague
- Children: 5
- Education: Duke University (BS); University of North Carolina, Chapel Hill (MBA)

Robert Cole Sprague (born April 18, 1973) is an American politician serving as the 49th Ohio treasurer of state since 2019. Prior to his election as treasurer, he represented the 83rd district in the Ohio House of Representatives, and served as city auditor and treasurer in his hometown of Findlay. He is a member of the Republican Party.

== Early life and career ==
Sprague was raised in Findlay, Ohio, and graduated from Findlay High School. He earned a Bachelor of Science in mechanical engineering from Duke University and a Master of Business Administration from the University of North Carolina at Chapel Hill.

Sprague began his career as a project lead at Ernst & Young in Atlanta, Georgia, and later founded a consulting firm advising businesses internationally. He subsequently returned to Findlay, where he served as city treasurer and auditor. In that role, he introduced annual financial reporting and worked on municipal debt and financial management.

== Ohio House of Representatives ==
In 2011, Representative Cliff Hite was appointed to the Ohio Senate, creating a vacancy in the 83rd House District. Sprague was appointed to fill the seat and was subsequently elected to full terms in 2012, 2014, and 2016.

During his tenure in the Ohio House of Representatives, Sprague served on the House Finance and Financial Institutions Committees. He was also involved in legislative efforts addressing prescription drug abuse and related policy issues.

=== Addressing drug addiction ===
As a member of the Ohio House of Representatives, Sprague served on the House Criminal Justice Committee. In a 2013 interview, he commented on challenges within the state’s criminal justice system related to drug offenses, stating that individuals with substance use disorders were “cycling through the courts, the jails, the prison system, and the mental health system,” and that the state had not yet developed effective long-term solutions.

During the 130th General Assembly, Sprague chaired a House committee that traveled throughout Ohio to gather information on the opioid addiction crisis.

Sprague sponsored and supported legislation addressing substance use and criminal justice policy, including measures related to drug education, prescribing practices, naloxone access, and specialized court programs for individuals with substance use disorders.

=== Developmental disabilities ===
In the 131st General Assembly, Sprague served as chairman of the House Finance Subcommittee on Health and Human Services. The biennial operating budget, H.B. 64, included provisions related to developmental disabilities policy.

Additional developmental disabilities-related provisions were included in H.B. 483, including changes to county board levy processes, establishment of Disability History and Awareness Month, and provisions related to STABLE accounts.

Sprague also co-sponsored H.B. 158, legislation that removed references to “mental retardation” from the Ohio Revised Code.

== Ohio treasurer ==
On March 7, 2017, Sprague announced his candidacy for Ohio treasurer.

During the campaign, he received endorsements from several Ohio newspaper editorial boards.

On November 6, 2018, Sprague was elected Ohio Treasurer of State, defeating Democratic nominee Rob Richardson 53% to 47%. He took office on January 11, 2019.

As treasurer, Sprague launched ResultsOHIO, a program focused on pay-for-success initiatives addressing social and public health challenges.

=== Campaign finance and industry contributions ===
During his 2018 campaign for Ohio Treasurer, Robert Sprague received contributions from a range of corporate political action committees (PACs), including those representing the energy, financial, and legal sectors.

Energy-sector PACs contributing to Sprague's campaign included NiSource Inc. PAC ($2,500), Duke Energy Corporation PAC ($1,000), American Electric Power Committee for Responsible Government ($2,500), One Energy Ohio PAC ($1,000), Marathon Petroleum Corporation Employees PAC ($7,000 total), and Murray Energy Corporation PAC ($5,000).

Sprague also received contributions from financial-sector PACs, including Huntington Bancshares Inc. PAC ($23,700 total), Fifth Third Bancorp Political Action Committee ($19,500 total), PNC Financial Services Group PAC ($5,000), and KeyCorp Advocates Fund ($5,000).

Additional contributions came from law firms and lobbying-related PACs, including Bricker Graydon LLP State Political Action Committee ($24,000 total), Vorys, Sater, Seymour and Pease Advocates for Effective Government ($5,000 total), Taft Stettinius & Hollister Better Government Fund ($5,400 total), Dinsmore & Shohl LLP PAC ($1,000), and Ice Miller PAC ($5,500 total).

=== Implementation and litigation related to House Bill 6 ===
Following the enactment of House Bill 6 (HB 6) in 2019, multiple lawsuits challenged the law’s constitutionality and the collection and distribution of associated charges. As Ohio Treasurer of State, Robert Sprague was named as a defendant in his official capacity due to the office’s statutory role in holding and administering certain funds established under the law.

Campaign finance filings from the Ohio Secretary of State show that Robert Sprague received contributions from energy and utility-affiliated political action committees during the period surrounding the passage of House Bill 6 (HB6), later central to the Ohio nuclear bribery scandal. These included a $500 contribution from Duke Energy PAC in 2017, along with contributions from other regulated industry and infrastructure-related PACs active in Ohio’s legislative environment.

=== Cryptocurrency ===
In 2018, the Ohio Treasurer's office launched OhioCrypto.com, a platform that allowed businesses to pay certain state taxes using cryptocurrency. In 2019, the State Board of Deposit requested an opinion from the Ohio Attorney General regarding the program. The attorney general concluded that the platform constituted a "financial transaction device" and required approval by the Board of Deposit before it could be used to collect state funds. The opinion also noted that the OhioCrypto.com program had been suspended pending issuance of the opinion.

=== Environmental, social, and governance (ESG) ===
As Ohio treasurer, Sprague said he would not make investment decisions based on environmental, social, and governance (ESG) factors, describing that position as consistent with the office's fiduciary responsibilities.

In March 2022, Sprague joined a multistate comment letter opposing possible Municipal Securities Rulemaking Board ESG disclosure requirements for municipal issuers.

In May 2023, Sprague was among 21 state financial officers who signed letters and questionnaires sent to major asset management firms and proxy advisory firms seeking information about their use of ESG considerations in investment and voting practices.

Sprague was also listed among supporters of the federal Ensuring Sound Guidance Act, a 2023 bill concerning ESG-related investment practices and municipal securities disclosures.

=== Tax withholding litigation ===
In 2021, Community Legal Aid filed a lawsuit in the Ohio Supreme Court against Ohio Tax Commissioner Jeff McClain and Treasurer Robert Sprague, alleging that the state failed to properly attribute employer-withheld income taxes to individual taxpayers, potentially resulting in double taxation in some cases.

In 2022, the Ohio Supreme Court dismissed the lawsuit.

== 2026 Ohio secretary of state campaign ==
On January 18, 2025, Sprague announced that he would run for governor of Ohio in the 2026 election, seeking to succeed term-limited governor Mike DeWine. However, Sprague withdrew from the race on February 5, 2025, running instead for Ohio secretary of state and endorsing Vivek Ramaswamy in the gubernatorial election.

Party political offices
Preceded by Josh Mandel	Republican nominee for Treasurer of Ohio; 2018, 2022	Succeeded by Jay Edwards
Preceded by Frank LaRose	Republican nominee for Secretary of State of Ohio; 2026	Most recent
Political offices
Preceded by Josh Mandel	Treasurer of Ohio; 2019–present	Incumbent
