= Gertrude Walton Donahey =

American politician (1908–2004)

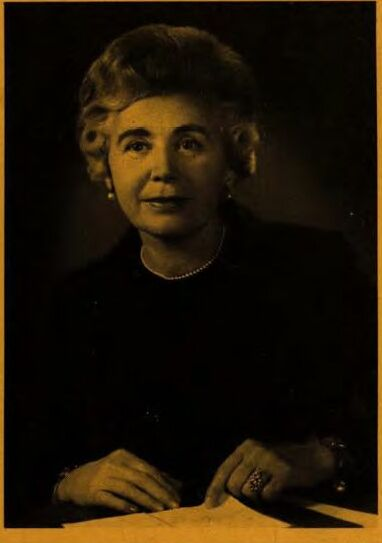

Ohio State Treasurer
- In office January 11, 1971 – January 10, 1983
- Governor: John J. Gilligan; Jim Rhodes
- Preceded by: John D. Herbert
- Succeeded by: Mary Ellen Withrow

Personal details
- Born: Gertrude Walton; August 4, 1908 Tuscarawas County, Ohio, U.S.
- Died: July 11, 2004 (aged 95) Bexley, Ohio, U.S.
- Resting place: East Avenue Cemetery, New Philadelphia, Ohio
- Party: Democratic
- Spouse: John W. Donahey (m. 1930)

Gertrude Walton Donahey (August 4, 1908 – July 11, 2004) was an American politician of the Democratic party who served as Ohio State Treasurer from 1971 to 1983.

== Biography ==
Donahey was born in Goshen Township, Tuscarawas County, Ohio. She earned her bachelor's at Mann's Business College in Columbus, Ohio and went to work at the Office of the Ohio Adjutant General's Business and Finance Division. She was married to John W. Donahey, who served for a time as Lieutenant Governor of Ohio. Her father-in-law, A. Victor Donahey, was a Governor of Ohio and a member of the United States Senate.

She was chosen as a delegate to the Democratic National Conventions in 1964 and 1968 and represented Ohio on the Party's platform and resolution committee. She was hired in 1964 by U.S. Senator Stephen M. Young as his executive assistant. She ran in the Democratic presidential primary in 1976 as a "favorite daughter." She wasn't a serious candidate, but rather a placeholder for the party to control delegate votes in Ohio.

In 1970, Donahey was the first woman to be elected to a statewide executive office in Ohio, and second to Ohio Supreme Court judge Florence E. Allen, as Ohio State Treasurer. She held the position until 1983 in light of an embezzlement scandal which took $1.3 million from her office. The embezzlement was carried out in 1978 by head cashier, Elizabeth Jane Boerger and her private business associate, Robert W. Yeazell. The accounting firm, Price Waterhouse & Company, who undertook the 1978 audit did it in 1981 after Boerger had left her position. The pair were indicted for the embezzlement on August 12, 1982.

She died in Bexley, Ohio, a suburb of Columbus, aged 95.

Party political offices
| Preceded by Eldon Brown | Democratic nominee for Treasurer of Ohio; 1970, 1974, 1978 | Succeeded by Mary Ellen Withrow |
