= Ohio State Treasurer =

Public office in the state of Ohio

State Treasurer of Ohio
- Seal of the state treasurer of Ohio

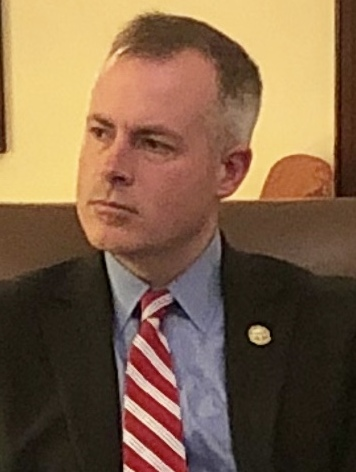
- Incumbent; Robert Sprague since January 14, 2019
- Style: The Honorable
- Term length: Four years, two consecutive term limit
- Inaugural holder: William McFarland; 1803
- Formation: Ohio Constitution
- Succession: Fifth
- Salary: $109,554
- Website: Office of the Treasurer

The treasurer of the U.S. state of Ohio is responsible for collecting and safeguarding taxes and fees, as well as managing state investments. The Treasury was located in the Ohio Statehouse from 1861 to 1974, when it was moved to the Rhodes State Office Tower. The original office in the statehouse, which has been restored to its 19th-century appearance, is used for ceremonial events.

Before Ohio became a state, John Armstrong was Treasurer-General of the Northwest Territory from 1796 to 1803. He was appointed to the post by the United States Congress. Under the first constitution of Ohio, 1803 to 1851, the state legislature appointed a treasurer. Since the second constitution in 1852, the office has been elective.

The current officeholder is Republican Robert Sprague.

== List of Ohio state treasurers ==
Image	Name	Term of office	Party
	William McFarland	1803–1816	
	Hiram M. Curry	1816–1820	
	Samuel Sullivan	1820–1823	
	Henry Brown	1823–1835	
	Joseph Whitehill	1835–1847	
	Albert A. Bliss	1847–1852	Whig
	John G. Breslin	1852–1856	Democratic
	William Harvey Gibson	1856–1857	Republican
	Alfred P. Stone	1857–1862	Republican
	G. V. Dorsey	1862–1865	Republican
	William Hooper	1865–1866	
	Sidney S. Warner	1866–1871	Republican
	Isaac Welsh	1872–1875	Republican
	Leroy Welsh	1875–1876	Republican
	John M. Millikin	1876–1878	Republican
	Anthony Howells	1878–1880	Democratic
	Joseph Turney	1880–1884	Republican
	Peter Brady	1884–1886	Democratic
	John C. Brown	1886–1892	Republican
	William T. Cope	1892–1896	Republican
	Samuel B. Campbell	1896–1900	Republican
	Isaac B. Cameron	1900–1904	Republican
	William S. McKinnon	1904–1908	Republican
	Charles C. Green	1908–1909	Republican
	David S. Creamer	1909–1913	Democratic
	John P. Brennan	1913–1915	Democratic
	Rudolph W. Archer	1915–1917	Republican
	Chester E. Bryan	1917–1919	Democratic
	Rudolph W. Archer	1919–1923	Republican
	Harry S. Day	1923–1927	Republican
	Bert B. Buckley	1927–1929	Republican
	H. Ross Ake	1929–1930	Republican
	Edwin A. Todd	1930–1931	
	Harry S. Day	1931–1937	Republican
	Clarence H. Knisley	1937–1939	
	Don H. Ebright	1939–1951	Republican
	Roger W. Tracy	1951–1959	Republican
	Joseph T. Ferguson	1959–1963	Democratic
	John D. Herbert	1963–1971	Republican
	Gertrude W. Donahey	1971–1983	Democratic
	Mary Ellen Withrow	1983–1994	Democratic
	J. Kenneth Blackwell	1994–1999	Republican
	Joseph T. Deters	1999–2005	Republican
	Jennette Bradley	2005–2007	Republican
	Richard Cordray	2007–2009	Democratic
	Kevin Boyce	2009–2011	Democratic
	Josh Mandel	2011–2019	Republican
	Robert Sprague	2019–present	Republican
	Seth Walsh	2027–	Democratic

== Elections ==
Ohio voters elect the treasurer for a four-year term in midterm election years, along with the governor and lieutenant governor, secretary of state, attorney general, and state auditor.

Year	Democratic	Republican	Other
2022	Scott Schertzer : 1,692,160	Robert Sprague : 2,390,542	
2018	Rob Richardson : 2,024,194	Robert Sprague : 2,308,425	
2014	Connie Pillich: 1,323,325	Josh Mandel: 1,724,060	
2010	Kevin Boyce: 1,525,912	Josh Mandel : 2,050,142	Matthew Cantrell (Libertarian): 184,478
2006	Richard Cordray: 2,223,282	Sandra O'Brien: 1,618,625	
2002	Mary O. Boyle: 1,459,113	Joseph Deters: 1,666,844	
1998	John A. Donofrio	Joseph Deters	
1994	Barbara Sykes	J. Kenneth Blackwell	
1990	Mary Ellen Withrow	Judith Y. Brachman	
1986	Mary Ellen Withrow	Jeff Jacobs	
1982	Mary Ellen Withrow	Dana G. Rinehart	
1978	Gertrude W. Donahey	George C. Rogers	
1974	Gertrude W. Donahey	Richard H. Harris	
1970	Gertrude W. Donahey	Robin T. Turner	
1966	Eldon Brown	John D. Herbert	
1962	Thomas E. Ferguson	John D. Herbert	
1958	Joseph T. Ferguson	Roger W. Tracy	
1956	John W. Donahey	Rober W. Tracy	
1954	Joseph T. Ferguson	Roger W. Tracy	
1952	John J. Gallagher	Roger W. Tracy	
1950	Frank M. Quinn	Roger W. Tracy	
1948	Harry V. Armstrong	Don H. Ebright	
1946	James T. Welsh	Don H. Ebright	
1944	Harry V. Armstrong	Don H. Ebright	
1942	Robert S. Cox	Don H. Ebright	
1940	Clarence H. Knisley	Don H. Ebright	
1922	William S. Hiler : 666,786	Harry S. Day : 844,398	
1920	Charles B. Orwig : 770,387	Rudolph W. Archer : 1,109,191	Max Goodman : 43,538; Adam Lehr : 1,537
1916	Chester E. Bryan : 565,902	Rudolph W. Archer : 542,198	Frank M. Hinkle : 38,299; John N. Ferguson : 6,708
1912	John P. Brennan	Rudolph W. Archer	William Kirtley, Jr. (Progressive)
1910	David S. Creamer	Rudolph W. Archer	
1908	David S. Creamer : 537,461	Charles C. Green : 536,030	Thomas C. Devine (Soc) : 31,865; James H. Ford (Pro) : 10,897; John P. Thornbury (Ind) : 587; Danford Hare (Peo) : 167; Henry Piper (Soc Lab) : 839
1905	Charles E. Mason : 418,515	William S. McKinnon : 462,447	Joseph H. Sims (Soc) : 18,277; Hiram L. Baker (Pro) : 13,837; Peter Faber (Soc Lab) : 1,831
1903	Volley J. Dahl : 356,617	William S. McKinnon : 474,033	Ithamar B. Hinman (Soc) : 14,165; Will Kingham (Pro) : 14,448; John H T Juergens (Soc Lab) : 2,185
1901	R. Page Aleshire	Isaac B. Cameron	
1899	James L. Gorman	Isaac B. Cameron	
1897	James F. Wilson : 401,024	Samuel B. Campbell : 427,521	Samuel Wells : 7,541; F M Morris : 5,849; Samuel Stevens : 1,535; Edward L. Larsen : 4,186; B W Maxwell : 437; T A Rodefer : 3,112
1895	William B. Shober 329,209	Samuel B. Campbell 427,706	
1893	Brisbin C. Blackburn 346,849	William T. Cope 422,483	
1891	Charles F. Ackerman 345,847	William T. Cope 373,395	
1889	William E. Boden 373,476	John C. Brown 377,102	
1887	George W. Harper 327,435	John C. Brown 357,597	
1885	Peter Brady 340,969	John C. Brown 361,463	
1883	Peter Brady 359,847	John C. Brown 348,399	
1881	Alonzo P. Winslow 286,591	Joseph Turney 316,232	
1879	Anthony Howells 317,193	Joseph Turney 335,670	
1877	Anthony Howells 270,461	John M. Millikin 250,746	
1875	John Schreiner 292,714	John M. Millikin 296,617	
1873	George Weimer 231,349	Isaac Welsh 213,527	
1871	Gustav Bruehl 218,390	Isaac Welsh 237,398	
1869	Stephen Buhrer 227,948	Sidney S. Warner 236,345	
1867	Charles Fulton 240,802	Sidney S. Warner 243,318	
1865	George Spence 192,972	Sidney S. Warner 225,673	
1863	Horace L. Knapp 188,320	Godwin V. Dorsey 284,976	
1861	George W. Holmes 151,548	Godwin V. Dorsey 207,439	
1859	William Bushnell 170,503	Alfred P. Stone 184,568	
1857	James R. Morris 158,756	Alfred P. Stone 160,585	
1855	John G. Breslin 132,925	William Harvey Gibson 169,350	
1853	John G. Breslin : 151,226	J. Wesley Chafin (Freesoil) : 33,934	Henry Brachman (Whig) : 95,862
1851	John G. Breslin : 145,331	Tobias A. Plants (Freesoil) : 13,127	Albert A. Bliss (Whig) : 124,554

== External sources ==
- "Ohio State Treasurer website".
- "Treasurers of State of the State of Ohio: 1796 – present". Jon Husted, Ohio Secretary of State. State of Ohio.
