= Political party strength in Ohio =

Politics in the US state of Ohio

The following table indicates the party of elected officials in the U.S. state of Ohio:

- Governor
- Lieutenant Governor
- Attorney General
- Secretary of State
- State Treasurer
- State Auditor

The table also indicates the historical party composition in the:

- State Senate
- State House of Representatives
- State Supreme Court
- State delegation to the U.S. Senate
- State delegation to the U.S. House of Representatives

For years in which a presidential election was held, the table indicates which party's nominees received the state's electoral votes. Also indicated is the party that controlled the Ohio Apportionment Board, which draws legislative districts for the Ohio General Assembly in the years following the United States Census.

== 1788–1845 ==
Year	Executive offices				State Legislature		Ohio Supreme Court	United States Congress			Electoral votes
Year	Governor	Secretary of State	Treasurer	Auditor	Senate	House	Ohio Supreme Court	Senator (Class I)	Senator (Class III)	House	Electoral votes
1788	Arthur St. Clair (F) (Note: Governor of the Northwest Territory appointed by the Continental Congress. There was no Ohio Territory; Ohio is considered the successor state to the Northwest Territory.)	Winthrop Sargent (F)									(Note: Ohio was accepted into the Union in 1803, and cast its first votes for president in the 1804 election.)
1789	Arthur St. Clair (F)	Winthrop Sargent (F)									(Note: Ohio was accepted into the Union in 1803, and cast its first votes for president in the 1804 election.)
1790	Arthur St. Clair (F)	Winthrop Sargent (F)									(Note: Ohio was accepted into the Union in 1803, and cast its first votes for president in the 1804 election.)
1791	Arthur St. Clair (F)	Winthrop Sargent (F)									(Note: Ohio was accepted into the Union in 1803, and cast its first votes for president in the 1804 election.)
1792	Arthur St. Clair (F)	Winthrop Sargent (F)									(Note: Ohio was accepted into the Union in 1803, and cast its first votes for president in the 1804 election.)
1793	Arthur St. Clair (F)	Winthrop Sargent (F)									(Note: Ohio was accepted into the Union in 1803, and cast its first votes for president in the 1804 election.)
1794	Arthur St. Clair (F)	Winthrop Sargent (F)									(Note: Ohio was accepted into the Union in 1803, and cast its first votes for president in the 1804 election.)
1795	Arthur St. Clair (F)	Winthrop Sargent (F)									(Note: Ohio was accepted into the Union in 1803, and cast its first votes for president in the 1804 election.)
1796	Arthur St. Clair (F)	Winthrop Sargent (F)	John Armstrong (F)								(Note: Ohio was accepted into the Union in 1803, and cast its first votes for president in the 1804 election.)
1797	Arthur St. Clair (F)	Winthrop Sargent (F)	John Armstrong (F)								(Note: Ohio was accepted into the Union in 1803, and cast its first votes for president in the 1804 election.)
1798	Arthur St. Clair (F)	Winthrop Sargent (F)	John Armstrong (F)								(Note: Ohio was accepted into the Union in 1803, and cast its first votes for president in the 1804 election.)
1799	Arthur St. Clair (F)	William Henry Harrison (F)	John Armstrong (F)								(Note: Ohio was accepted into the Union in 1803, and cast its first votes for president in the 1804 election.)
1800	Arthur St. Clair (F)	Charles Willing Byrd (DR)	John Armstrong (F)								(Note: Ohio was accepted into the Union in 1803, and cast its first votes for president in the 1804 election.)
1801	Arthur St. Clair (F)	Charles Willing Byrd (DR)	John Armstrong (F)								(Note: Ohio was accepted into the Union in 1803, and cast its first votes for president in the 1804 election.)
1802	Arthur St. Clair (F)	Charles Willing Byrd (DR)	John Armstrong (F)								(Note: Ohio was accepted into the Union in 1803, and cast its first votes for president in the 1804 election.)
1803	Edward Tiffin (DR) (Note: Resigned to take an elected seat in the United States Senate.)	William Creighton Jr. (DR)	William McFarland (DR)	Thomas Gibson (DR)	DR maj.	DR maj.	3DR	John Smith (DR)	Thomas Worthington (DR)	1DR	(Note: Ohio was accepted into the Union in 1803, and cast its first votes for president in the 1804 election.)
1804	Edward Tiffin (DR)	William Creighton Jr. (DR)	William McFarland (DR)	Thomas Gibson (DR)	DR maj.	DR maj.	3DR	John Smith (DR)	Thomas Worthington (DR)	1DR	Thomas Jefferson/ George Clinton (DR) ✓
1805	Edward Tiffin (DR)	William Creighton Jr. (DR)	William McFarland (DR)	Thomas Gibson (DR)	DR maj.	DR maj.	3DR	John Smith (DR)	Thomas Worthington (DR)	1DR	Thomas Jefferson/ George Clinton (DR) ✓
1806	Edward Tiffin (DR)	William Creighton Jr. (DR)	William McFarland (DR)	Thomas Gibson (DR)	DR maj.	DR maj.	3DR	John Smith (DR)	Thomas Worthington (DR)	1DR	Thomas Jefferson/ George Clinton (DR) ✓
1807	Thomas Kirker (DR) (Note: As speaker of the Senate, acted as governor for unexpired term.)	William Creighton Jr. (DR)	William McFarland (DR)	Thomas Gibson (DR)	DR maj.	DR maj.	3DR	John Smith (DR)	Edward Tiffin (DR)	1DR	Thomas Jefferson/ George Clinton (DR) ✓
1808	Samuel Huntington (DR) (Note: The 1808 election was actually won by Return J. Meigs Jr., but Meigs was declared ineligible for office for failing residency requirements.)	Jeremiah McLene (DR)	William McFarland (DR)	Benjamin Hough (DR)	DR maj.	DR maj.	4DR	vacant	Edward Tiffin (DR)	1DR	James Madison/ George Clinton (DR) ✓
1809	Samuel Huntington (DR)	Jeremiah McLene (DR)	William McFarland (DR)	Benjamin Hough (DR)	DR maj.	DR maj.	4DR	Return J. Meigs Jr. (DR)	Stanley Griswold (DR)	1DR	James Madison/ George Clinton (DR) ✓
1810	Return J. Meigs Jr. (DR) (Note: Resigned to become United States Postmaster General.)	Jeremiah McLene (DR)	William McFarland (DR)	Benjamin Hough (DR)	DR maj.	DR maj.	4DR	Return J. Meigs Jr. (DR)	Alexander Campbell (DR)	1DR	James Madison/ George Clinton (DR) ✓
1811	Return J. Meigs Jr. (DR)	Jeremiah McLene (DR)	William McFarland (DR)	Benjamin Hough (DR)	DR maj.	DR maj.	3DR	Thomas Worthington (DR)	Alexander Campbell (DR)	1DR	James Madison/ George Clinton (DR) ✓
1812	Return J. Meigs Jr. (DR)	Jeremiah McLene (DR)	William McFarland (DR)	Benjamin Hough (DR)	DR maj.	DR maj.	3DR	Thomas Worthington (DR)	Alexander Campbell (DR)	1DR	James Madison/ Elbridge Gerry (DR) ✓
1813	Return J. Meigs Jr. (DR)	Jeremiah McLene (DR)	William McFarland (DR)	Benjamin Hough (DR)	DR maj.	DR maj.	3DR	Thomas Worthington (DR)	Alexander Campbell (DR)	6DR	James Madison/ Elbridge Gerry (DR) ✓
1814	Othniel Looker (DR)	Jeremiah McLene (DR)	William McFarland (DR)	Benjamin Hough (DR)	DR maj.	DR maj.	3DR	Thomas Worthington (DR)	Jeremiah Morrow (DR)	6DR	James Madison/ Elbridge Gerry (DR) ✓
1815	Thomas Worthington (DR)	Jeremiah McLene (DR)	William McFarland (DR)	Ralph Osborn (DR)	DR maj.	DR maj.	3DR	Joseph Kerr (DR)	Jeremiah Morrow (DR)	6DR	James Madison/ Elbridge Gerry (DR) ✓
1816	Thomas Worthington (DR)	Jeremiah McLene (DR)	Hiram M. Curry (DR)	Ralph Osborn (DR)	DR maj.	DR maj.	4DR	Benjamin Ruggles (DR)	Jeremiah Morrow (DR)	6DR	James Monroe/ Daniel D. Tompkins (DR) ✓
1817	Thomas Worthington (DR)	Jeremiah McLene (DR)	Hiram M. Curry (DR)	Ralph Osborn (DR)	DR maj.	DR maj.	4DR	Benjamin Ruggles (DR)	Jeremiah Morrow (DR)	6DR	James Monroe/ Daniel D. Tompkins (DR) ✓
1818	Ethan Allen Brown (DR)	Jeremiah McLene (DR)	Hiram M. Curry (DR)	Ralph Osborn (DR)	DR maj.	DR maj.	4DR	Benjamin Ruggles (DR)	Jeremiah Morrow (DR)	6DR	James Monroe/ Daniel D. Tompkins (DR) ✓
1819	Ethan Allen Brown (DR)	Jeremiah McLene (DR)	Hiram M. Curry (DR)	Ralph Osborn (DR)	DR maj.	DR maj.	4DR	Benjamin Ruggles (DR)	William A. Trimble (DR)	6DR	James Monroe/ Daniel D. Tompkins (DR) ✓
1820	Ethan Allen Brown (DR)	Jeremiah McLene (DR)	Samuel Sullivan (DR)	Ralph Osborn (DR)	DR maj.	DR maj.	4DR	Benjamin Ruggles (DR)	William A. Trimble (DR)	6DR	James Monroe/ Daniel D. Tompkins (DR) ✓
1821	Ethan Allen Brown (DR)	Jeremiah McLene (DR)	Samuel Sullivan (DR)	Ralph Osborn (DR)	DR maj.	DR maj.	4DR	Benjamin Ruggles (DR)	William A. Trimble (DR)	6DR	James Monroe/ Daniel D. Tompkins (DR) ✓
1822	Allen Trimble (F)	Jeremiah McLene (DR)	Samuel Sullivan (DR)	Ralph Osborn (DR)	DR maj.	DR maj.	4DR	Benjamin Ruggles (DR)	Ethan Allen Brown (DR)	6DR	James Monroe/ Daniel D. Tompkins (DR) ✓
1822	Jeremiah Morrow (DR)	Jeremiah McLene (DR)	Samuel Sullivan (DR)	Ralph Osborn (DR)	DR maj.	DR maj.	4DR	Benjamin Ruggles (DR)	Ethan Allen Brown (DR)	6DR	James Monroe/ Daniel D. Tompkins (DR) ✓
1823	Jeremiah Morrow (DR)	Jeremiah McLene (DR)	Henry Brown (DR)	Ralph Osborn (DR)	DR maj.	DR maj.	4DR	Benjamin Ruggles (DR)	Ethan Allen Brown (DR)	10NR, 2J, 2DR	James Monroe/ Daniel D. Tompkins (DR) ✓
1824	Jeremiah Morrow (DR)	Jeremiah McLene (DR)	Henry Brown (DR)	Ralph Osborn (DR)	DR maj.	DR maj.	4DR	Benjamin Ruggles (DR)	Ethan Allen Brown (DR)	10NR, 2J, 2DR	Henry Clay/ Nathan Sanford (DR) ✗
1825	Jeremiah Morrow (DR)	Jeremiah McLene (DR)	Henry Brown (DR)	Ralph Osborn (DR)	[?]	[?]	4NR	Benjamin Ruggles (NR)	William Henry Harrison (NR)	12NR, 2J	Henry Clay/ Nathan Sanford (DR) ✗
1826	Allen Trimble (NR) (Note: Allen Trimble ran as a Federalist in 1822 and National Republican in 1826.)	Jeremiah McLene (DR)	Henry Brown (DR)	Ralph Osborn (DR)	[?]	[?]	4NR	Benjamin Ruggles (NR)	William Henry Harrison (NR)	12NR, 2J	Henry Clay/ Nathan Sanford (DR) ✗
1827	Allen Trimble (NR)	Jeremiah McLene (DR)	Henry Brown (DR)	Ralph Osborn (DR)	[?]	[?]	4NR	Benjamin Ruggles (NR)	William Henry Harrison (NR)	12NR, 2J	Henry Clay/ Nathan Sanford (DR) ✗
1828	Allen Trimble (NR)	Jeremiah McLene (DR)	Henry Brown (DR)	Ralph Osborn (DR)	22NR, 13J	44NR, 28J	4NR	Benjamin Ruggles (NR)	Jacob Burnet (NR)	12NR, 2J	Andrew Jackson/ John C. Calhoun (D) ✓
1829	Allen Trimble (NR)	Jeremiah McLene (DR)	Henry Brown (DR)	Ralph Osborn (DR)	19NR, 17J	38NR, 34J	4NR	Benjamin Ruggles (NR)	Jacob Burnet (NR)	8J, 6NR	Andrew Jackson/ John C. Calhoun (D) ✓
1830	Duncan McArthur (NR)	Jeremiah McLene (DR)	Henry Brown (DR)	Ralph Osborn (DR)	21J, 15NR	37J, 32NR, 3?	2NR, 2J	Benjamin Ruggles (NR)	Jacob Burnet (NR)	8J, 6NR	Andrew Jackson/ John C. Calhoun (D) ✓
1831	Duncan McArthur (NR)	Moses H. Kirby (NR)	Henry Brown (DR)	Ralph Osborn (DR)	18D, 18W (Note: A Democrat, Samuel R. Miller, was elected as Speaker of the Senate.)	38NR, 29D, 5A-C	3NR, 1J	Benjamin Ruggles (NR)	Jacob Burnet (NR)	8NR, 6J	Andrew Jackson/ John C. Calhoun (D) ✓
1832	Robert Lucas (D)	Moses H. Kirby (NR)	Henry Brown (DR)	Ralph Osborn (DR)	20NR, 16D	42NR, 30D	3NR, 1J	Benjamin Ruggles (NR)	Thomas Ewing (NR)	8NR, 6J	Andrew Jackson/ Martin Van Buren (D) ✓
1833	Robert Lucas (D)	Moses H. Kirby (NR)	Henry Brown (DR)	John A. Bryan (D)	19D, 17W	39D, 31W, 2?	2NR, 2D	Thomas Morris (J)	Thomas Ewing (NR)	11D, 6NR, 2A-M	Andrew Jackson/ Martin Van Buren (D) ✓
1834	Robert Lucas (D)	Moses H. Kirby (NR)	Henry Brown (DR)	John A. Bryan (D)	22D, 14NR	46D, 26NR	2NR, 2D	Thomas Morris (J)	Thomas Ewing (NR)	11D, 6NR, 2A-M	Andrew Jackson/ Martin Van Buren (D) ✓
1835	Robert Lucas (D)	Benjamin B. Hinkson (D)	Joseph Whitehill (W)	John A. Bryan (D)	19D, 17W (Note: A Whig, Peter Hitchcock, was elected as a minority-party Speaker of the Senate at organization. Another Whig, Charles Anthony, was elected as a minority-party Speaker after Hitchcock resigned in March. In a special session in June concerning the Toledo War, a Democrat, David Disney, was elected as Speaker.)	42W, 29D, 1?	3W, 1D	Thomas Morris (J)	Thomas Ewing (NR)	9D, 9W, 1A-M	Andrew Jackson/ Martin Van Buren (D) ✓
1836	Joseph Vance (W)	Carter B. Harlan (D)	Joseph Whitehill (W)	John A. Bryan (D)	20D, 16W	46D, 26W	2D, 2W	Thomas Morris (J)	Thomas Ewing (NR)	9D, 9W, 1A-M	William Henry Harrison/ Francis Granger (W) ✗
1837	Joseph Vance (W)	Carter B. Harlan (D)	Joseph Whitehill (W)	John A. Bryan (D)	20W, 16D (Note: Democrat Elijah Vance was re-elected as a minority-party Speaker of the Senate.)	37D, 35W	2D, 2W	Thomas Morris (D)	William Allen (D)	11W, 8D	William Henry Harrison/ Francis Granger (W) ✗
1838	Wilson Shannon (D)	Carter B. Harlan (D)	Joseph Whitehill (W)	John A. Bryan (D)	20W, 16D	40W, 32D	2D, 2W	Thomas Morris (D)	William Allen (D)	11W, 8D	William Henry Harrison/ Francis Granger (W) ✗
1839	Wilson Shannon (D)	Carter B. Harlan (D)	Joseph Whitehill (W)	John Brough (D)	19D, 17W	38D, 34W	2D, 2W	Benjamin Tappan (D)	William Allen (D)	11D, 8W	William Henry Harrison/ Francis Granger (W) ✗
1840	Thomas Corwin (W)	William Trevitt (D)	Joseph Whitehill (W)	John Brough (D)	25D, 11W	48D, 24W	2D, 2W	Benjamin Tappan (D)	William Allen (D)	11D, 8W	William Henry Harrison/ John Tyler (W) ✓
1841	Thomas Corwin (W)	John Sloane (W)	Joseph Whitehill (W)	John Brough (D)	22D, 14W	51W, 21D	2D, 2W	Benjamin Tappan (D)	William Allen (D)	12W, 7D	William Henry Harrison/ John Tyler (W) ✓
1842	Wilson Shannon (D) (Note: Resigned to become United States minister to Mexico.)	John Sloane (W)	Joseph Whitehill (W)	John Brough (D)	19D, 17W	37D, 35W	3D, 1W	Benjamin Tappan (D)	William Allen (D)	12W, 7D	William Henry Harrison/ John Tyler (W) ✓
1843	Wilson Shannon (D)	John Sloane (W)	Joseph Whitehill (W)	John Brough (D)	22D, 14W	39D, 33W	3D, 1W	Benjamin Tappan (D)	William Allen (D)	12D, 9W	William Henry Harrison/ John Tyler (W) ✓
1844	Thomas W. Bartley (D)	Samuel Galloway (W)	Joseph Whitehill (W)	John Brough (D)	20D, 16W	38W, 34D	3D, 1W	Benjamin Tappan (D)	William Allen (D)	12D, 9W	Henry Clay/ Theodore Frelinghuysen (W) ✗
1844	Mordecai Bartley (W)	Samuel Galloway (W)	Joseph Whitehill (W)	John Brough (D)	20D, 16W	38W, 34D	3D, 1W	Benjamin Tappan (D)	William Allen (D)	12D, 9W	Henry Clay/ Theodore Frelinghuysen (W) ✗
1845	Mordecai Bartley (W)	Samuel Galloway (W)	Joseph Whitehill (W)	John Woods (W)	22W, 14D	41W, 31D	3D, 1W	Benjamin Tappan (D)	William Allen (D)	13D, 8W	Henry Clay/ Theodore Frelinghuysen (W) ✗

== 1846–present ==
Year	Executive offices						State Legislature		Ohio Supreme Court	United States Congress			Electoral votes
Year	Governor	Lt. Governor	Attorney General	Secretary of State	Treasurer	Auditor	Senate	House	Ohio Supreme Court	Senator (Class I)	Senator (Class III)	House	Electoral votes
1846	William Bebb (W) (Note: Bebb's term officially ended in December 1848. However, due to the large number of close elections that year, the General Assembly was delayed in qualifying governor-elect Seabury Ford, and Bebb remained in office for an extra few weeks.)	no such office	Henry Stanbery (W)	Samuel Galloway (W)	Joseph Whitehill (W)	John Woods (W)	21W, 15D	44W, 28D	3D, 1W	Thomas Corwin (W)	William Allen (D)	13D, 8W	
1847	William Bebb (W)	no such office	Henry Stanbery (W)	Samuel Galloway (W)	Albert A. Bliss (W)	John Woods (W)	18D, 18W (Note: A Democrat, Brewster Randall, was chosen as Speaker of the Senate on the 1st Ballot.)	39W, 32D, 1I	2D, 2W	Thomas Corwin (W)	William Allen (D)	11W, 10D	
1848	William Bebb (W)	no such office	Henry Stanbery (W)	Samuel Galloway (W)	Albert A. Bliss (W)	John Woods (W)	19W, 17D	40W, 32D	2D, 2W	Thomas Corwin (W)	William Allen (D)	11W, 10D	Cass/ Butler (D) ✗
1849	Seabury Ford (W)	no such office	Henry Stanbery (W)	Samuel Galloway (W)	Albert A. Bliss (W)	John Woods (W)	18W, 18D (Note: A Free Soiler who ran on the Whig ticket, Brewster Randall, was chosen as Speaker of the Senate on the 16th Ballot.)	37W, 35D (Note: A Democrat, John G. Breslin, was elected as a minority-party Speaker on the 3rd Ballot.)	2D, 2W	Thomas Corwin (W)	William Allen (D)	11D, 8W, 2FS	Cass/ Butler (D) ✗
1850	Reuben Wood (D) (Note: Wood's first term was truncated to one year, due to the 1851 constitution's moving elections one year back to odd-numbered years; resigned to become consul in Valparaíso, Chile.)	no such office	Henry Stanbery (W)	Henry W. King (FS)	Albert A. Bliss (W)	John Woods (W)	16W, 16D, 4FS (Note: A Whig, Harrison G. O. Blake, was chosen as Speaker of the Senate on the 301st Ballot.)	36W, 29D, 7FS (Note: A Democrat, Benjamin F. Leiter, was elected as a minority-party Speaker on the 10th Ballot.)	2D, 2W	Thomas Ewing (W)	Salmon P. Chase (FS)	11D, 8W, 2FS	Cass/ Butler (D) ✗
1851	Reuben Wood (D)	no such office	Joseph McCormick (D)	Henry W. King (FS)	Albert A. Bliss (W)	John Woods (W)	17W, 16D, 3FS (Note: A Whig, Charles Cleveland Convers, was elected as Speaker of the Senate in coalition with the Free Soilers on the 14th Ballot.)	34W, 32D, 6FS (Note: A Free Soiler, John F. Morse, was elected as Speaker in coalition with the Democrats on the 11th Ballot.)	3D, 1W	Benjamin Wade (W)	Salmon P. Chase (FS)	11D, 9W, 1FS	Cass/ Butler (D) ✗
1852	Reuben Wood (D)	William Medill (D)	George E. Pugh (D)	William Trevitt (D)	John G. Breslin (D)	William Duane Morgan (D)	24D, 9W, 1FS (Note: Due to the approval of the Ohio Constitution of 1851, legislators began to serve two-year terms.)	65D, 28W, 1FS	5D	Benjamin Wade (W)	Salmon P. Chase (FS)	11D, 9W, 1FS	Pierce/ King (D) ✓
1853	William Medill (D) (Note: As lieutenant governor, filled unexpired term, and was later elected in his own right.)	James Myers (D)	George E. Pugh (D)	William Trevitt (D)	John G. Breslin (D)	William Duane Morgan (D)	24D, 9W, 1FS	65D, 28W, 1FS	5D	Benjamin Wade (W)	Salmon P. Chase (FS)	12D, 7W, 2FS	Pierce/ King (D) ✓
1854	William Medill (D)	James Myers (D)	George McCook (D)	William Trevitt (D)	John G. Breslin (D)	William Duane Morgan (D)	26D, 7W	70D, 17W, 9FS	5D	Benjamin Wade (W)	Salmon P. Chase (FS)	12D, 7W, 2FS	Pierce/ King (D) ✓
1855	William Medill (D)	James Myers (D)	George McCook (D)	William Trevitt (D)	John G. Breslin (D)	William Duane Morgan (D)	26D, 7W	70D, 17W, 9FS	4D, 1R	Benjamin Wade (W)	Salmon P. Chase (FS)	21 A-Neb.	Pierce/ King (D) ✓
1856	Salmon P. Chase (R)	Thomas H. Ford (R)	Francis D. Kimball (R)	James H. Baker (R)	William H. Gibson (R)	Francis M. Wright (R)	29R, 6D	78R, 34D	3R, 2D	Benjamin Wade (R)	George E. Pugh (D)	21 A-Neb.	Frémont/ Dayton (R) ✗
1857	Salmon P. Chase (R)	Thomas H. Ford (R)	Christopher Wolcott (R)	James H. Baker (R)	William H. Gibson (R)	Francis M. Wright (R)	29R, 6D	78R, 34D	4R, 1D	Benjamin Wade (R)	George E. Pugh (D)	13R, 8D	Frémont/ Dayton (R) ✗
1858	Salmon P. Chase (R)	Martin Welker (R)	Christopher Wolcott (R)	Addison Peale Russell (R)	Alfred P. Stone (R)	Francis M. Wright (R)	20D, 13R	62D, 44R, 1I	4R, 1D	Benjamin Wade (R)	George E. Pugh (D)	13R, 8D	Frémont/ Dayton (R) ✗
1859	Salmon P. Chase (R)	Martin Welker (R)	Christopher Wolcott (R)	Addison Peale Russell (R)	Alfred P. Stone (R)	Francis M. Wright (R)	20D, 13R	62D, 44R, 1I	5R	Benjamin Wade (R)	George E. Pugh (D)	15R, 6D	Frémont/ Dayton (R) ✗
1860	William Dennison Jr. (R)	Robert C. Kirk (R)	Christopher Wolcott (R)	Addison Peale Russell (R)	Alfred P. Stone (R)	Robert Walker Tayler Sr. (R)	25R, 10D	58R, 46D, 1I	5R	Benjamin Wade (R)	George E. Pugh (D)	15R, 6D	Lincoln/ Hamlin (R) ✓
1861	William Dennison Jr. (R)	Robert C. Kirk (R)	James Murray (R)	Addison Peale Russell (R)	Alfred P. Stone (R)	Robert Walker Tayler Sr. (R)	25R, 10D	58R, 46D, 1I	5R	Benjamin Wade (R)	Salmon P. Chase (R)	15R, 6D	Lincoln/ Hamlin (R) ✓
1861	William Dennison Jr. (R)	Robert C. Kirk (R)	James Murray (R)	Addison Peale Russell (R)	Alfred P. Stone (R)	Robert Walker Tayler Sr. (R)	25R, 10D	58R, 46D, 1I	5R	Benjamin Wade (R)	John Sherman (R)	13R, 8D	Lincoln/ Hamlin (R) ✓
1862	David Tod (R)	Benjamin Stanton (R)	James Murray (R)	Benjamin R. Cowen (R)	G. V. Dorsey (R)	Robert Walker Tayler Sr. (R)	26R, 8D	74R, 23D	5R	Benjamin Wade (R)	John Sherman (R)	13R, 8D	Lincoln/ Hamlin (R) ✓
1863	David Tod (R)	Benjamin Stanton (R)	Lyman R. Critchfield (D)	William W. Armstrong (D)	G. V. Dorsey (R)	Oviatt Cole (R)	26R, 8D	74R, 23D	4R, 1D	Benjamin Wade (R)	John Sherman (R)	14D, 5R	Lincoln/ Hamlin (R) ✓
1864	John Brough (R) (Note: Died in office.)	Charles Anderson (R)	Lyman R. Critchfield (D)	William W. Armstrong (D)	G. V. Dorsey (R)	James H. Godman (R)	30R, 4D	76R, 21D	4R, 1D	Benjamin Wade (R)	John Sherman (R)	14D, 5R	Lincoln/ Johnson (NU) ✓
1865	Charles Anderson (R) (Note: As lieutenant governor, filled unexpired term.)	vacant	William P. Richardson (R)	William Henry Smith (R)	William Hooper (R)	James H. Godman (R)	30R, 4D	76R, 21D	5R	Benjamin Wade (R)	John Sherman (R)	17R, 2D	Lincoln/ Johnson (NU) ✓
1866	Jacob Dolson Cox (R)	Andrew McBurney (R)	William H. West (R)	William Henry Smith (R)	S. S. Warner (R)	James H. Godman (R)	25R, 12D	71R, 34D	5R	Benjamin Wade (R)	John Sherman (R)	17R, 2D	Lincoln/ Johnson (NU) ✓
1867	Jacob Dolson Cox (R)	Andrew McBurney (R)	William H. West (R)	William Henry Smith (R)	S. S. Warner (R)	James H. Godman (R)	25R, 12D	71R, 34D	5R	Benjamin Wade (R)	John Sherman (R)	16R, 3D	Lincoln/ Johnson (NU) ✓
1868	Rutherford B. Hayes (R)	John C. Lee (R)	William H. West (R)	John Russell (R)	S. S. Warner (R)	James H. Godman (R)	18D, 17R	56D, 49R	5R	Benjamin Wade (R)	John Sherman (R)	16R, 3D	Grant/ Colfax (R) ✓
1869	Rutherford B. Hayes (R)	John C. Lee (R)	William H. West (R)	Isaac R. Sherwood (R)	S. S. Warner (R)	James H. Godman (R)	18D, 17R	56D, 49R	5R	Allen G. Thurman (D)	John Sherman (R)	13R, 6D	Grant/ Colfax (R) ✓
1870	Rutherford B. Hayes (R)	John C. Lee (R)	Francis Bates Pond (R)	Isaac R. Sherwood (R)	S. S. Warner (R)	James H. Godman (R)	19R, 18D	57R, 54D	5R	Allen G. Thurman (D)	John Sherman (R)	13R, 6D	Grant/ Colfax (R) ✓
1871	Rutherford B. Hayes (R)	John C. Lee (R)	Francis Bates Pond (R)	Isaac R. Sherwood (R)	S. S. Warner (R)	James H. Godman (R)	19R, 18D	57R, 54D	5R	Allen G. Thurman (D)	John Sherman (R)	14R, 5D	Grant/ Colfax (R) ✓
1872	Edward F. Noyes (R)	Jacob Mueller (R)	Francis Bates Pond (R)	Isaac R. Sherwood (R)	Isaac Welsh (R)	James Williams (R)	18R, 18D (Note: Though the Senate was tied, the Republicans had control of the Senate Presidency due to the tie-breaking vote of the Lt. Governor.)	57R, 48D	5R	Allen G. Thurman (D)	John Sherman (R)	14R, 5D	Grant/ Wilson (R) ✓
1873	Edward F. Noyes (R)	Jacob Mueller (R)	Francis Bates Pond (R)	Allen T. Wikoff (R)	Isaac Welsh (R)	James Williams (R)	18R, 18D	57R, 48D	5R	Allen G. Thurman (D)	John Sherman (R)	14R, 6D	Grant/ Wilson (R) ✓
1874	William Allen (D)	Alphonso Hart (R)	John Little (R)	Allen T. Wikoff (R)	Isaac Welsh (R)	James Williams (R)	22D, 14R	58D, 44R, 3I	5R	Allen G. Thurman (D)	John Sherman (R)	14R, 6D	Grant/ Wilson (R) ✓
1875	William Allen (D)	Alphonso Hart (R)	John Little (R)	William Bell Jr. (D)	Isaac Welsh (R)	James Williams (R)	22D, 14R	58D, 44R, 3I	3R, 2D	Allen G. Thurman (D)	John Sherman (R)	13D, 7R	Grant/ Wilson (R) ✓
1876	Rutherford B. Hayes (R) (Note: Resigned to become president of the United States.)	Thomas L. Young (R)	John Little (R)	William Bell Jr. (D)	John M. Millikin (R)	James Williams (R)	20R, 17D	65R, 46D	3R, 2D	Allen G. Thurman (D)	John Sherman (R)	13D, 7R	Hayes/ Wheeler (R) ✓
1877	Thomas L. Young (R)	H. W. Curtiss (R) (Note: Acting.)	John Little (R)	Milton Barnes (R)	John M. Millikin (R)	James Williams (R)	20R, 17D	65R, 46D	4R, 1D	Allen G. Thurman (D)	Stanley Matthews (R)	12R, 8D	Hayes/ Wheeler (R) ✓
1878	Richard M. Bishop (D)	Jabez W. Fitch (D)	Isaiah Pillars (D)	Milton Barnes (R)	Anthony Howells (D)	James Williams (R)	25D, 10R	68D, 38R, 3G	3R, 2D	Allen G. Thurman (D)	Stanley Matthews (R)	12R, 8D	Hayes/ Wheeler (R) ✓
1879	Richard M. Bishop (D)	Jabez W. Fitch (D)	Isaiah Pillars (D)	Milton Barnes (R)	Anthony Howells (D)	James Williams (R)	25D, 10R	68D, 38R, 3G	3R, 2D	Allen G. Thurman (D)	George H. Pendleton (D)	11D, 9R	Hayes/ Wheeler (R) ✓
1880	Charles Foster (R)	Andrew Hickenlooper (R)	George K. Nash (R)	Milton Barnes (R)	Joseph Turney (R)	John F. Oglevee (R)	23R, 14D	69R, 45D	4R, 1D	Allen G. Thurman (D)	George H. Pendleton (D)	11D, 9R	Garfield/ Arthur (R) ✓
1881	Charles Foster (R)	Andrew Hickenlooper (R)	George K. Nash (R)	Charles Townsend (R)	Joseph Turney (R)	John F. Oglevee (R)	23R, 14D	69R, 45D	4R, 1D	John Sherman (R)	George H. Pendleton (D)	15R, 5D	Garfield/ Arthur (R) ✓
1882	Charles Foster (R)	Rees G. Richards (R)	George K. Nash (R)	Charles Townsend (R)	Joseph Turney (R)	John F. Oglevee (R)	22R, 11D	70R, 35D	4R, 1D	John Sherman (R)	George H. Pendleton (D)	15R, 5D	Garfield/ Arthur (R) ✓
1883	Charles Foster (R)	Rees G. Richards (R)	George K. Nash (R)	James W. Newman (D)	Joseph Turney (R)	John F. Oglevee (R)	22R, 11D	70R, 35D	4R, 1D	John Sherman (R)	George H. Pendleton (D)	13D, 8R	Garfield/ Arthur (R) ✓
1884	George Hoadly (D)	John G. Warwick (D)	James Lawrence (D)	James W. Newman (D)	Peter Brady (D)	Emil Kiesewetter (D)	22D, 11R	60D, 45R	3D, 2R	John Sherman (R)	George H. Pendleton (D)	13D, 8R	Blaine/ Logan (R) ✗
1885	George Hoadly (D)	John G. Warwick (D)	James Lawrence (D)	James S. Robinson (R)	Peter Brady (D)	Emil Kiesewetter (D)	22D, 11R	60D, 45R	3D, 2R	John Sherman (R)	Henry B. Payne (D)	11D, 10R	Blaine/ Logan (R) ✗
1886	Joseph B. Foraker (R)	Robert P. Kennedy (R) (Note: Elected to United States House of Representatives representing Ohio's 8th congressional district.)	Jacob A. Kohler (R)	James S. Robinson (R)	John C. Brown (R)	Emil Kiesewetter (D)	21R, 16D (Note: There was a contest over four seats from Hamilton County and whether the Democrats or Republicans won them. The Democrats initially claimed the Senate Presidency under John O'Neill. After a compromise was worked out on not seating the four Democrats being contested, the 15 of the other 16 Democrats left the chamber, leaving it short of a quorum of 19. Some days later, a motion was made on the floor to accept the four Republicans, and it was granted. This allowed the Republicans to choose Silas A. Conrad as President pro tempore, and to organize and control the chamber.)	68R, 42D	3R, 2D	John Sherman (R)	Henry B. Payne (D)	11D, 10R	Blaine/ Logan (R) ✗
1887	Joseph B. Foraker (R)	Silas A. Conrad (R)	Jacob A. Kohler (R)	James S. Robinson (R)	John C. Brown (R)	Emil Kiesewetter (D)	21R, 16D	68R, 42D	4R, 1D	John Sherman (R)	Henry B. Payne (D)	15R, 6D	Blaine/ Logan (R) ✗
1888	Joseph B. Foraker (R)	William C. Lyon (R)	David K. Watson (R)	James S. Robinson (R)	John C. Brown (R)	Ebenezer W. Poe (R)	25R, 11D	65R, 45D	4R, 1D	John Sherman (R)	Henry B. Payne (D)	15R, 6D	Harrison/ Morton (R) ✓
1889	Joseph B. Foraker (R)	William C. Lyon (R)	David K. Watson (R)	Daniel J. Ryan (R)	John C. Brown (R)	Ebenezer W. Poe (R)	25R, 11D	65R, 45D	5R	John Sherman (R)	Henry B. Payne (D)	16R, 5D	Harrison/ Morton (R) ✓
1890	James E. Campbell (D)	Elbert L. Lampson (R)	David K. Watson (R)	Daniel J. Ryan (R)	John C. Brown (R)	Ebenezer W. Poe (R)	19D, 17R	60D, 54R	5R	John Sherman (R)	Henry B. Payne (D)	16R, 5D	Harrison/ Morton (R) ✓
1890	James E. Campbell (D)	William V. Marquis (D)	David K. Watson (R)	Daniel J. Ryan (R)	John C. Brown (R)	Ebenezer W. Poe (R)	19D, 17R	60D, 54R	5R	John Sherman (R)	Henry B. Payne (D)	16R, 5D	Harrison/ Morton (R) ✓
1891	James E. Campbell (D)	William V. Marquis (D)	David K. Watson (R)	Daniel J. Ryan (R)	John C. Brown (R)	Ebenezer W. Poe (R)	19D, 17R	60D, 54R	5R	John Sherman (R)	Calvin S. Brice (D)	14D, 7R	Harrison/ Morton (R) ✓
1892	William McKinley (R)	Andrew L. Harris (R)	John K. Richards (R)	Christian L. Poorman (R)	William T. Cope (R)	Ebenezer W. Poe (R)	21R, 10D	72R, 35D	5R	John Sherman (R)	Calvin S. Brice (D)	14D, 7R	Harrison/ Reid (R) ✗ (Note: Grover Cleveland and Adlai Stevenson I (D) also carried 1 of Ohio's 23 electoral votes due to a faithless elector.)
1893	William McKinley (R)	Andrew L. Harris (R)	John K. Richards (R)	Samuel McIntire Taylor (R)	William T. Cope (R)	Ebenezer W. Poe (R)	21R, 10D	72R, 35D	6R	John Sherman (R)	Calvin S. Brice (D)	11D, 10R	Harrison/ Reid (R) ✗
1894	William McKinley (R)	Andrew L. Harris (R)	John K. Richards (R)	Samuel McIntire Taylor (R)	William T. Cope (R)	Ebenezer W. Poe (R)	26R, 5D	85R, 22D	6R	John Sherman (R)	Calvin S. Brice (D)	11D, 10R	Harrison/ Reid (R) ✗
1895	William McKinley (R)	Andrew L. Harris (R)	John K. Richards (R)	Samuel McIntire Taylor (R)	William T. Cope (R)	Ebenezer W. Poe (R)	26R, 5D	85R, 22D	6R	John Sherman (R)	Calvin S. Brice (D)	19R, 2D	Harrison/ Reid (R) ✗
1896	Asa S. Bushnell (R)	Asa W. Jones (R)	Frank S. Monnett (R)	Samuel McIntire Taylor (R)	Samuel B. Campbell (R)	Walter D. Guilbert (R)	30R, 6D, 1P	87R, 25D	6R	John Sherman (R)	Calvin S. Brice (D)	19R, 2D	McKinley/ Hobart (R) ✓
1897	Asa S. Bushnell (R)	Asa W. Jones (R)	Frank S. Monnett (R)	Charles Kinney (R)	Samuel B. Campbell (R)	Walter D. Guilbert (R)	30R, 6D, 1P	87R, 25D	6R	Mark Hanna (R)	Calvin S. Brice (D)	15R, 6D	McKinley/ Hobart (R) ✓
1898	Asa S. Bushnell (R)	Asa W. Jones (R)	Frank S. Monnett (R)	Charles Kinney (R)	Samuel B. Campbell (R)	Walter D. Guilbert (R)	18D, 17R, 1IR (Note: The Independent Republican voted to give the Democrats control of the Senate Presidency and the chamber.)	62R, 47D	6R	Mark Hanna (R)	Joseph B. Foraker (R)	15R, 6D	McKinley/ Hobart (R) ✓
1899	Asa S. Bushnell (R)	Asa W. Jones (R)	Frank S. Monnett (R)	Charles Kinney (R)	Samuel B. Campbell (R)	Walter D. Guilbert (R)	18D, 17R, 1IR	62R, 47D	6R	Mark Hanna (R)	Joseph B. Foraker (R)	15R, 6D	McKinley/ Hobart (R) ✓
1900	George K. Nash (R)	John A. Caldwell	John M. Sheets (R)	Charles Kinney (R)	Isaac B. Cameron (R)	Walter D. Guilbert (R)	19R, 11D, 1IR	62R, 45D, 3IR	6R	Mark Hanna (R)	Joseph B. Foraker (R)	15R, 6D	McKinley/ Roosevelt (R) ✓
1901	George K. Nash (R)	John A. Caldwell	John M. Sheets (R)	Lewis C. Laylin (R)	Isaac B. Cameron (R)	Walter D. Guilbert (R)	19R, 11D, 1IR	62R, 45D, 3IR	6R	Mark Hanna (R)	Joseph B. Foraker (R)	17R, 4D	McKinley/ Roosevelt (R) ✓
1902	George K. Nash (R)	Carl L. Nippert (R)	John M. Sheets (R)	Lewis C. Laylin (R)	Isaac B. Cameron (R)	Walter D. Guilbert (R)	21R, 12D	68R, 42D	6R	Mark Hanna (R)	Joseph B. Foraker (R)	17R, 4D	McKinley/ Roosevelt (R) ✓
1902	George K. Nash (R)	Harry L. Gordon (R)	John M. Sheets (R)	Lewis C. Laylin (R)	Isaac B. Cameron (R)	Walter D. Guilbert (R)	21R, 12D	68R, 42D	6R	Mark Hanna (R)	Joseph B. Foraker (R)	17R, 4D	McKinley/ Roosevelt (R) ✓
1903	George K. Nash (R)	Harry L. Gordon (R)	John M. Sheets (R)	Lewis C. Laylin (R)	Isaac B. Cameron (R)	Walter D. Guilbert (R)	21R, 12D	68R, 42D	6R	Mark Hanna (R)	Joseph B. Foraker (R)	17R, 4D	McKinley/ Roosevelt (R) ✓
1904	Myron T. Herrick (R)	Warren G. Harding (R)	Wade H. Ellis (R)	Lewis C. Laylin (R)	William S. McKinnon (R)	Walter D. Guilbert (R)	29R, 4D	88R, 22D	6R	Charles W. F. Dick (R)	Joseph B. Foraker (R)	17R, 4D	Roosevelt/ Fairbanks (R) ✓
1905	Myron T. Herrick (R)	Warren G. Harding (R)	Wade H. Ellis (R)	Lewis C. Laylin (R)	William S. McKinnon (R)	Walter D. Guilbert (R)	29R, 4D	88R, 22D	6R	Charles W. F. Dick (R)	Joseph B. Foraker (R)	20R, 1D	Roosevelt/ Fairbanks (R) ✓
1906	John M. Pattison (D) (Note: A 1905 amendment to the state constitution shifted elections forward one year, to take place on even years; thus Pattison's term, completed by Lieutenant Governor Andrew L. Harris Harris, was extended to three years.)	Andrew L. Harris (R)	Wade H. Ellis (R)	Lewis C. Laylin (R)	William S. McKinnon (R)	Walter D. Guilbert (R)	18D, 18R, 1I (Note: The Independent voted to give the Democrats control of the Senate Presidency and the chamber.) (Note: Due to a state constitutional amendment, every legislator elected in 1905 served a three-year term, and would serve two-year terms afterward.)	62R, 75D, 2I	6R	Charles W. F. Dick (R)	Joseph B. Foraker (R)	20R, 1D	Roosevelt/ Fairbanks (R) ✓
1906	Andrew L. Harris (R)	vacant	Wade H. Ellis (R)	Lewis C. Laylin (R)	William S. McKinnon (R)	Walter D. Guilbert (R)	18D, 18R, 1I	62R, 75D, 2I	6R	Charles W. F. Dick (R)	Joseph B. Foraker (R)	20R, 1D	Roosevelt/ Fairbanks (R) ✓
1907	Andrew L. Harris (R)	vacant	Wade H. Ellis (R)	Carmi Thompson (R)	William S. McKinnon (R)	Walter D. Guilbert (R)	18D, 18R, 1I	62R, 75D, 2I	6R	Charles W. F. Dick (R)	Joseph B. Foraker (R)	16R, 5D	Roosevelt/ Fairbanks (R) ✓
1908	Andrew L. Harris (R)	vacant	Wade H. Ellis (R)	Carmi Thompson (R)	William S. McKinnon (R)	Walter D. Guilbert (R)	18D, 18R, 1I	62R, 75D, 2I	6R	Charles W. F. Dick (R)	Joseph B. Foraker (R)	16R, 5D	Taft/ Sherman (R) ✓
1909	Judson Harmon (D)	Francis W. Treadway (R)	Ulysses G. Denman (R)	Carmi Thompson (R)	David S. Creamer (D)	Edward M. Fullington (R)	20R, 14D	71R, 45D, 1I	6R	Charles W. F. Dick (R)	Theodore E. Burton (R)	13R, 8D	Taft/ Sherman (R) ✓
1910	Judson Harmon (D)	Francis W. Treadway (R)	Ulysses G. Denman (R)	Carmi Thompson (R)	David S. Creamer (D)	Edward M. Fullington (R)	20R, 14D	71R, 45D, 1I	6R	Charles W. F. Dick (R)	Theodore E. Burton (R)	13R, 8D	Taft/ Sherman (R) ✓
1911	Judson Harmon (D)	Atlee Pomerene (D)	Timothy Hogan (D)	Charles H. Graves (D)	David S. Creamer (D)	Edward M. Fullington (R)	19D, 15R	70D, 49R	4R, 2D	Atlee Pomerene (D)	Theodore E. Burton (R)	16D, 5R	Taft/ Sherman (R) ✓
1912	Judson Harmon (D)	Hugh L. Nichols (D)	Timothy Hogan (D)	Charles H. Graves (D)	David S. Creamer (D)	Edward M. Fullington (R)	19D, 15R	70D, 49R	4R, 2D	Atlee Pomerene (D)	Theodore E. Burton (R)	16D, 5R	Wilson/ Marshall (D) ✓
1913	James M. Cox (D)	W. A. Greenlund (D)	Timothy Hogan (D)	Charles H. Graves (D)	John P. Brennan (D)	Vic Donahey (D)	26D, 7R	87D, 33R, 3Prog	5D, 2R	Atlee Pomerene (D)	Theodore E. Burton (R)	19D, 3R	Wilson/ Marshall (D) ✓
1914	James M. Cox (D)	W. A. Greenlund (D)	Timothy Hogan (D)	Charles H. Graves (D)	John P. Brennan (D)	Vic Donahey (D)	26D, 7R	87D, 33R, 3Prog	5D, 2R	Atlee Pomerene (D)	Theodore E. Burton (R)	19D, 3R	Wilson/ Marshall (D) ✓
1915	Frank B. Willis (R)	John H. Arnold (R)	Edward C. Turner (R)	Charles Q. Hildebrant (R)	Rudolph W. Archer (R)	Vic Donahey (D)	20R, 13D	72R, 50D, 1Prog	4D, 3R	Atlee Pomerene (D)	Warren G. Harding (R)	13R, 9D	Wilson/ Marshall (D) ✓
1916	Frank B. Willis (R)	John H. Arnold (R)	Edward C. Turner (R)	Charles Q. Hildebrant (R)	Rudolph W. Archer (R)	Vic Donahey (D)	20R, 13D	72R, 50D, 1Prog	4D, 3R	Atlee Pomerene (D)	Warren G. Harding (R)	13R, 9D	Wilson/ Marshall (D) ✓
1917	James M. Cox (D)	Earl D. Bloom (D)	Joseph McGhee (D)	William D. Fulton (D)	Chester E. Bryan (D)	Vic Donahey (D)	25D, 11R	72D, 56R	4D, 3R	Atlee Pomerene (D)	Warren G. Harding (R)	13D, 9R	Wilson/ Marshall (D) ✓
1918	James M. Cox (D)	Earl D. Bloom (D)	Joseph McGhee (D)	William D. Fulton (D)	Chester E. Bryan (D)	Vic Donahey (D)	25D, 11R	72D, 56R	4D, 3R	Atlee Pomerene (D)	Warren G. Harding (R)	13D, 9R	Wilson/ Marshall (D) ✓
1919	James M. Cox (D)	Clarence J. Brown (R)	John G. Price (R)	Harvey C. Smith (R)	Rudolph W. Archer (R)	Vic Donahey (D)	27R, 7D	100R, 36D	4R, 3D	Atlee Pomerene (D)	Warren G. Harding (R)	14R, 8D	Wilson/ Marshall (D) ✓
1920	James M. Cox (D)	Clarence J. Brown (R)	John G. Price (R)	Harvey C. Smith (R)	Rudolph W. Archer (R)	Vic Donahey (D)	27R, 7D	100R, 36D	4R, 3D	Atlee Pomerene (D)	Warren G. Harding (R)	14R, 8D	Harding/ Coolidge (R) ✓
1921	Harry L. Davis (R)	Clarence J. Brown (R)	John G. Price (R)	Harvey C. Smith (R)	Rudolph W. Archer (R)	Joseph T. Tracy (R)	36R, 1D	113R, 12D	6R, 1D	Atlee Pomerene (D)	Frank B. Willis (R)	22R	Harding/ Coolidge (R) ✓
1922	Harry L. Davis (R)	Clarence J. Brown (R)	John G. Price (R)	Harvey C. Smith (R)	Rudolph W. Archer (R)	Joseph T. Tracy (R)	36R, 1D	113R, 12D	6R, 1D	Atlee Pomerene (D)	Frank B. Willis (R)	22R	Harding/ Coolidge (R) ✓
1923	Vic Donahey (D)	Earl D. Bloom (D)	Charles C. Crabbe (R)	Thad H. Brown (R)	Harry S. Day (R)	Joseph T. Tracy (R)	31R, 4D	103R, 27D	6R, 1D	Simeon D. Fess (R)	Frank B. Willis (R)	16R, 6D	Harding/ Coolidge (R) ✓
1924	Vic Donahey (D)	Earl D. Bloom (D)	Charles C. Crabbe (R)	Thad H. Brown (R)	Harry S. Day (R)	Joseph T. Tracy (R)	31R, 4D	103R, 27D	6R, 1D	Simeon D. Fess (R)	Frank B. Willis (R)	16R, 6D	Coolidge/ Dawes (R) ✓
1925	Vic Donahey (D)	Charles H. Lewis (R)	Charles C. Crabbe (R)	Thad H. Brown (R)	Harry S. Day (R)	Joseph T. Tracy (R)	33R, 2D	110R, 20D	6R, 1D	Simeon D. Fess (R)	Frank B. Willis (R)	16R, 6D	Coolidge/ Dawes (R) ✓
1926	Vic Donahey (D)	Charles H. Lewis (R)	Charles C. Crabbe (R)	Thad H. Brown (R)	Harry S. Day (R)	Joseph T. Tracy (R)	33R, 2D	110R, 20D	6R, 1D	Simeon D. Fess (R)	Frank B. Willis (R)	16R, 6D	Coolidge/ Dawes (R) ✓
1927	Vic Donahey (D)	Earl D. Bloom (D)	Edward C. Turner (R)	Clarence J. Brown (R)	Bert B. Buckley (R)	Joseph T. Tracy (R)	35R, 2D	103R, 33D	6R, 1D	Simeon D. Fess (R)	Frank B. Willis (R)	16R, 6D	Coolidge/ Dawes (R) ✓
1928	Vic Donahey (D)	William G. Pickrel (D)	Edward C. Turner (R)	Clarence J. Brown (R)	Bert B. Buckley (R)	Joseph T. Tracy (R)	35R, 2D	103R, 33D	6R, 1D	Simeon D. Fess (R)	Cyrus Locher (D)	16R, 6D	Coolidge/ Dawes (R) ✓
1928	Vic Donahey (D)	George C. Braden (R)	Edward C. Turner (R)	Clarence J. Brown (R)	Bert B. Buckley (R)	Joseph T. Tracy (R)	35R, 2D	103R, 33D	6R, 1D	Simeon D. Fess (R)	Theodore E. Burton (R)	16R, 6D	Hoover/ Curtis (R) ✓
1929	Myers Y. Cooper (R)	John T. Brown (R)	Gilbert Bettman (R)	Clarence J. Brown (R)	H. Ross Ake (R)	Joseph T. Tracy (R)	31R	122R, 11D	6R, 1D	Simeon D. Fess (R)	Roscoe C. McCulloch (R)	19R, 3D	Hoover/ Curtis (R) ✓
1930	Myers Y. Cooper (R)	John T. Brown (R)	Gilbert Bettman (R)	Clarence J. Brown (R)	H. Ross Ake (R)	Joseph T. Tracy (R)	31R	122R, 11D	6R, 1D	Simeon D. Fess (R)	Robert J. Bulkley (D)	19R, 3D	Hoover/ Curtis (R) ✓
1931	George White (D)	William G. Pickrel (D)	Gilbert Bettman (R)	Clarence J. Brown (R)	Harry S. Day (R)	Joseph T. Tracy (R)	18R, 14D	70R, 58D	6R, 1D	Simeon D. Fess (R)	Robert J. Bulkley (D)	13R, 9D	Hoover/ Curtis (R) ✓
1932	George White (D)	William G. Pickrel (D)	Gilbert Bettman (R)	Clarence J. Brown (R)	Harry S. Day (R)	Joseph T. Tracy (R)	18R, 14D	70R, 58D	5R, 2D	Simeon D. Fess (R)	Robert J. Bulkley (D)	13R, 9D	Roosevelt/ Garner (D) ✓
1933	George White (D)	Charles W. Sawyer (D)	John W. Bricker (R)	George S. Myers (D)	Harry S. Day (R)	Joseph T. Tracy (R)	16D, 16R (Note: Though the Senate was tied, the Democrats had control of the Senate Presidency due to the tie-breaking vote of the Lt. Governor.)	84D, 51R	4R, 3D	Simeon D. Fess (R)	Robert J. Bulkley (D)	18D, 6R	Roosevelt/ Garner (D) ✓
1934	George White (D)	Charles W. Sawyer (D)	John W. Bricker (R)	George S. Myers (D)	Harry S. Day (R)	Joseph T. Tracy (R)	16D, 16R	84D, 51R	5D, 2R	Simeon D. Fess (R)	Robert J. Bulkley (D)	18D, 6R	Roosevelt/ Garner (D) ✓
1935	Martin L. Davey (D)	Harold G. Mosier (D)	John W. Bricker (R)	George S. Myers (D)	Harry S. Day (R)	Joseph T. Tracy (R)	19D, 13R	68R, 67D (Note: Elected a Democratic Speaker.)	4R, 3D	Vic Donahey (D)	Robert J. Bulkley (D)	18D, 6R	Roosevelt/ Garner (D) ✓
1936	Martin L. Davey (D)	Harold G. Mosier (D)	John W. Bricker (R)	George S. Myers (D)	Harry S. Day (R)	Joseph T. Tracy (R)	19D, 13R	68R, 67D	4R, 3D	Vic Donahey (D)	Robert J. Bulkley (D)	18D, 6R	Roosevelt/ Garner (D) ✓
1937	Martin L. Davey (D)	Paul P. Yoder (D)	Herbert S. Duffy (D)	William Kennedy (D)	Clarence H. Knisley (D)	Joseph T. Ferguson (D)	31D, 5R	105D, 33R	4R, 3D	Vic Donahey (D)	Robert J. Bulkley (D)	21D, 3R	Roosevelt/ Garner (D) ✓
1938	Martin L. Davey (D)	Paul P. Yoder (D)	Herbert S. Duffy (D)	William Kennedy (D)	Clarence H. Knisley (D)	Joseph T. Ferguson (D)	31D, 5R	105D, 33R	4D, 3R	Vic Donahey (D)	Robert J. Bulkley (D)	21D, 3R	Roosevelt/ Garner (D) ✓
1939	John W. Bricker (R)	Paul M. Herbert (R)	Thomas J. Herbert (R)	Earl Griffith (R)	Don H. Ebright (R)	Joseph T. Ferguson (D)	27R, 7D	100R, 36D	4R, 3D	Vic Donahey (D)	Robert A. Taft (R)	15R, 9D	Roosevelt/ Garner (D) ✓
1940	John W. Bricker (R)	Paul M. Herbert (R)	Thomas J. Herbert (R)	George M. Neffiner (R)	Don H. Ebright (R)	Joseph T. Ferguson (D)	27R, 7D	100R, 36D	4R, 3D	Vic Donahey (D)	Robert A. Taft (R)	15R, 9D	Roosevelt/ Wallace (D) ✓
1941	John W. Bricker (R)	Paul M. Herbert (R)	Thomas J. Herbert (R)	John E. Sweeney (D)	Don H. Ebright (R)	Joseph T. Ferguson (D)	19R, 17D	78R, 60D	5R, 2D	Harold H. Burton (R)	Robert A. Taft (R)	12R, 12D	Roosevelt/ Wallace (D) ✓
1942	John W. Bricker (R)	Paul M. Herbert (R)	Thomas J. Herbert (R)	John E. Sweeney (D)	Don H. Ebright (R)	Joseph T. Ferguson (D)	19R, 17D	78R, 60D	5R, 2D	Harold H. Burton (R)	Robert A. Taft (R)	12R, 12D	Roosevelt/ Wallace (D) ✓
1943	John W. Bricker (R)	Paul M. Herbert (R)	Thomas J. Herbert (R)	Edward J. Hummel (R)	Don H. Ebright (R)	Joseph T. Ferguson (D)	28R, 5D	111R, 25D	5R, 2D	Harold H. Burton (R)	Robert A. Taft (R)	20R, 3D	Roosevelt/ Wallace (D) ✓
1944	John W. Bricker (R)	Paul M. Herbert (R)	Thomas J. Herbert (R)	Edward J. Hummel (R)	Don H. Ebright (R)	Joseph T. Ferguson (D)	28R, 5D	111R, 25D	5R, 2D	Harold H. Burton (R)	Robert A. Taft (R)	20R, 3D	Dewey/ Bricker (R) ✗
1945	Frank Lausche (D)	George D. Nye (D)	Hugh S. Jenkins (R)	Edward J. Hummel (R)	Don H. Ebright (R)	Joseph T. Ferguson (D)	20R, 13D	89R, 47D	5R, 2D	James W. Huffman (D)	Robert A. Taft (R)	17R, 6D	Dewey/ Bricker (R) ✗
1946	Frank Lausche (D)	George D. Nye (D)	Hugh S. Jenkins (R)	Edward J. Hummel (R)	Don H. Ebright (R)	Joseph T. Ferguson (D)	20R, 13D	89R, 47D	5R, 2D	Kingsley A. Taft (R)	Robert A. Taft (R)	17R, 6D	Dewey/ Bricker (R) ✗
1947	Thomas J. Herbert (R)	Paul M. Herbert (R)	Hugh S. Jenkins (R)	Edward J. Hummel (R)	Don H. Ebright (R)	Joseph T. Ferguson (D)	32R, 4D	123R, 16D	4R, 3D	John W. Bricker (R)	Robert A. Taft (R)	19R, 4D	Dewey/ Bricker (R) ✗
1948	Thomas J. Herbert (R)	Paul M. Herbert (R)	Hugh S. Jenkins (R)	Edward J. Hummel (R)	Don H. Ebright (R)	Joseph T. Ferguson (D)	32R, 4D	123R, 16D	4R, 3D	John W. Bricker (R)	Robert A. Taft (R)	19R, 4D	Truman/ Barkley (D) ✓
1949	Frank Lausche (D)	George D. Nye (D)	Herbert S. Duffy (D)	Donald K. Zoller (R)	Don H. Ebright (R)	Joseph T. Ferguson (D)	19D, 14R	69D, 66R	5R, 2D	John W. Bricker (R)	Robert A. Taft (R)	12D, 11R	Truman/ Barkley (D) ✓
1950	Frank Lausche (D)	George D. Nye (D)	Herbert S. Duffy (D)	Donald K. Zoller (R)	Don H. Ebright (R)	Joseph T. Ferguson (D)	19D, 14R	69D, 66R	5R, 2D	John W. Bricker (R)	Robert A. Taft (R)	12D, 11R	Truman/ Barkley (D) ✓
1951	Frank Lausche (D)	George D. Nye (D)	C. William O'Neill (R)	Ted W. Brown (R)	Roger W. Tracy (R)	Joseph T. Ferguson (D)	26R, 7D	98R, 36D, 1I	5R, 2D	John W. Bricker (R)	Robert A. Taft (R)	16R, 6D, 1I	Truman/ Barkley (D) ✓
1952	Frank Lausche (D)	George D. Nye (D)	C. William O'Neill (R)	Ted W. Brown (R)	Roger W. Tracy (R)	Joseph T. Ferguson (D)	26R, 7D	98R, 36D, 1I	5R, 2D	John W. Bricker (R)	Robert A. Taft (R)	16R, 6D, 1I	Eisenhower/ Nixon (R) ✓
1953	Frank Lausche (D)	John W. Brown (R)	C. William O'Neill (R)	Ted W. Brown (R)	Roger W. Tracy (R)	Jim Rhodes (R)	23R, 10D	102R, 34D	5R, 2D	John W. Bricker (R)	Thomas A. Burke (D)	16R, 6D, 1I	Eisenhower/ Nixon (R) ✓
1954	Frank Lausche (D)	John W. Brown (R)	C. William O'Neill (R)	Ted W. Brown (R)	Roger W. Tracy (R)	Jim Rhodes (R)	23R, 10D	102R, 34D	4R, 3D	John W. Bricker (R)	George H. Bender (D)	16R, 6D, 1I	Eisenhower/ Nixon (R) ✓
1955	Frank Lausche (D)	John W. Brown (R)	C. William O'Neill (R)	Ted W. Brown (R)	Roger W. Tracy (R)	Jim Rhodes (R)	21R, 12D	89R, 47D	4R, 3D	John W. Bricker (R)	George H. Bender (D)	17R, 6D	Eisenhower/ Nixon (R) ✓
1956	Frank Lausche (D)	John W. Brown (R)	C. William O'Neill (R)	Ted W. Brown (R)	Roger W. Tracy (R)	Jim Rhodes (R)	21R, 12D	89R, 47D	4R, 3D	John W. Bricker (R)	George H. Bender (D)	17R, 6D	Eisenhower/ Nixon (R) ✓
1957	John W. Brown (R)	vacant	William B. Saxbe(R)	Ted W. Brown (R)	Roger W. Tracy (R)	Jim Rhodes (R)	22R, 12D	97R, 42D	4R, 3D	John W. Bricker (R)	Frank Lausche (D)	17R, 6D	Eisenhower/ Nixon (R) ✓
1957	C. William O'Neill (R)	Paul M. Herbert (R)	William B. Saxbe(R)	Ted W. Brown (R)	Roger W. Tracy (R)	Jim Rhodes (R)	22R, 12D	97R, 42D	4R, 3D	John W. Bricker (R)	Frank Lausche (D)	17R, 6D	Eisenhower/ Nixon (R) ✓
1958	C. William O'Neill (R)	Paul M. Herbert (R)	William B. Saxbe(R)	Ted W. Brown (R)	Roger W. Tracy (R)	Jim Rhodes (R)	22R, 12D	97R, 42D	4R, 3D	John W. Bricker (R)	Frank Lausche (D)	17R, 6D	Eisenhower/ Nixon (R) ✓
1959	Michael DiSalle (D)	John W. Donahey (D)	Mark McElroy (D)	Ted W. Brown (R)	Joseph T. Ferguson (D)	Jim Rhodes (R)	20D, 13R	78D, 61R	4R, 3D	Stephen M. Young (D)	Frank Lausche (D)	15R, 8D	Eisenhower/ Nixon (R) ✓
1960	Michael DiSalle (D)	John W. Donahey (D)	Mark McElroy (D)	Ted W. Brown (R)	Joseph T. Ferguson (D)	Jim Rhodes (R)	20D, 13R	78D, 61R	4R, 3D	Stephen M. Young (D)	Frank Lausche (D)	15R, 8D	Nixon/ Lodge (R) ✗
1961	Michael DiSalle (D)	John W. Donahey (D)	Mark McElroy (D)	Ted W. Brown (R)	Joseph T. Ferguson (D)	Jim Rhodes (R)	20R, 18D	84R, 55D	4R, 3D	Stephen M. Young (D)	Frank Lausche (D)	16R, 7D	Nixon/ Lodge (R) ✗
1962	Michael DiSalle (D)	John W. Donahey (D)	Mark McElroy (D)	Ted W. Brown (R)	Joseph T. Ferguson (D)	Jim Rhodes (R)	20R, 18D	84R, 55D	4R, 3D	Stephen M. Young (D)	Frank Lausche (D)	16R, 7D	Nixon/ Lodge (R) ✗
1963	Jim Rhodes (R)	John W. Brown (R)	William B. Saxbe (R)	Ted W. Brown (R)	John D. Herbert (R)	Roger W. Tracy (R)	20R, 13D	88R, 49D	6R, 1D	Stephen M. Young (D)	Frank Lausche (D)	18R, 6D	Nixon/ Lodge (R) ✗
1964	Jim Rhodes (R)	John W. Brown (R)	William B. Saxbe (R)	Ted W. Brown (R)	John D. Herbert (R)	Chester W. Goble (R)	20R, 13D	88R, 49D	6R, 1D	Stephen M. Young (D)	Frank Lausche (D)	18R, 6D	Johnson/ Humphrey (D) ✓
1965	Jim Rhodes (R)	John W. Brown (R)	William B. Saxbe (R)	Ted W. Brown (R)	John D. Herbert (R)	Roger Cloud (R)	16R, 16D (Note: Though the Senate was tied, the Republicans had control of the Senate Presidency due to the tie-breaking vote of the Lt. Governor.)	75R, 62D	6R, 1D	Stephen M. Young (D)	Frank Lausche (D)	14R, 10D	Johnson/ Humphrey (D) ✓
1966	Jim Rhodes (R)	John W. Brown (R)	William B. Saxbe (R)	Ted W. Brown (R)	John D. Herbert (R)	Archer E. Reilly (R)	16R, 16D	75R, 62D	6R, 1D	Stephen M. Young (D)	Frank Lausche (D)	14R, 10D	Johnson/ Humphrey (D) ✓
1967	Jim Rhodes (R)	John W. Brown (R)	William B. Saxbe (R)	Ted W. Brown (R)	John D. Herbert (R)	Roger Cloud (R)	23R, 10D	62R, 37D	6R, 1D	Stephen M. Young (D)	Frank Lausche (D)	19R, 5D	Johnson/ Humphrey (D) ✓
1968	Jim Rhodes (R)	John W. Brown (R)	William B. Saxbe (R)	Ted W. Brown (R)	John D. Herbert (R)	Roger Cloud (R)	23R, 10D	62R, 37D	6R, 1D	Stephen M. Young (D)	Frank Lausche (D)	19R, 5D	Nixon/ Agnew (R) ✓
1969	Jim Rhodes (R)	John W. Brown (R)	Paul W. Brown (R)	Ted W. Brown (R)	John D. Herbert (R)	Roger Cloud (R)	21R, 12D	64R, 35D	6R, 1D	Stephen M. Young (D)	William B. Saxbe (R)	18R, 6D	Nixon/ Agnew (R) ✓
1970	Jim Rhodes (R)	John W. Brown (R)	Paul W. Brown (R)	Ted W. Brown (R)	John D. Herbert (R)	Roger Cloud (R)	21R, 12D	64R, 35D	7R	Stephen M. Young (D)	William B. Saxbe (R)	18R, 6D	Nixon/ Agnew (R) ✓
1971	John J. Gilligan (D)	John W. Brown (R)	William J. Brown (D)	Ted W. Brown (R)	Gertrude W. Donahey (D)	Joseph T. Ferguson (D)	20R, 13D	54R, 45D	7R	Robert Taft Jr. (R)	William B. Saxbe (R)	17R, 7D	Nixon/ Agnew (R) ✓
1972	John J. Gilligan (D)	John W. Brown (R)	William J. Brown (D)	Ted W. Brown (R)	Gertrude W. Donahey (D)	Joseph T. Ferguson (D)	20R, 13D	54R, 45D	6R, 1D	Robert Taft Jr. (R)	William B. Saxbe (R)	17R, 7D	Nixon/ Agnew (R) ✓
1973	John J. Gilligan (D)	John W. Brown (R)	William J. Brown (D)	Ted W. Brown (R)	Gertrude W. Donahey (D)	Joseph T. Ferguson (D)	17R, 16D	57D, 42R	5R, 2D	Robert Taft Jr. (R)	William B. Saxbe (R)	16R, 7D	Nixon/ Agnew (R) ✓
1974	John J. Gilligan (D)	John W. Brown (R)	William J. Brown (D)	Ted W. Brown (R)	Gertrude W. Donahey (D)	Joseph T. Ferguson (D)	17R, 16D	57D, 42R	5R, 2D	Robert Taft Jr. (R)	William B. Saxbe (R)	16R, 7D	Nixon/ Agnew (R) ✓
1974	John J. Gilligan (D)	John W. Brown (R)	William J. Brown (D)	Ted W. Brown (R)	Gertrude W. Donahey (D)	Joseph T. Ferguson (D)	17R, 16D	57D, 42R	5R, 2D	Robert Taft Jr. (R)	Howard Metzenbaum (D)	16R, 7D	Nixon/ Agnew (R) ✓
1975	Jim Rhodes (R)	Dick Celeste (D)	William J. Brown (D)	Ted W. Brown (R)	Gertrude W. Donahey (D)	Thomas E. Ferguson (D)	21D, 12R	59D, 40R	5R, 2D	Robert Taft Jr. (R)	John Glenn (D)	15R, 8D	Nixon/ Agnew (R) ✓
1976	Jim Rhodes (R)	Dick Celeste (D)	William J. Brown (D)	Ted W. Brown (R)	Gertrude W. Donahey (D)	Thomas E. Ferguson (D)	21D, 12R	59D, 40R	5R, 2D	Howard Metzenbaum (D)	John Glenn (D)	15R, 8D	Carter/ Mondale (D) ✓
1977	Jim Rhodes (R)	Dick Celeste (D)	William J. Brown (D)	Ted W. Brown (R)	Gertrude W. Donahey (D)	Thomas E. Ferguson (D)	21D, 12R	62D, 37R	4D, 3R	Howard Metzenbaum (D)	John Glenn (D)	13R, 10D	Carter/ Mondale (D) ✓
1978	Jim Rhodes (R)	Dick Celeste (D)	William J. Brown (D)	Ted W. Brown (R)	Gertrude W. Donahey (D)	Thomas E. Ferguson (D)	21D, 12R	62D, 37R	4D, 3R	Howard Metzenbaum (D)	John Glenn (D)	13R, 10D	Carter/ Mondale (D) ✓
1979	Jim Rhodes (R)	George Voinovich (R) (Note: Resigned to become Mayor of Cleveland.)	William J. Brown (D)	Anthony J. Celebrezze Jr. (D)	Gertrude W. Donahey (D)	Thomas E. Ferguson (D)	18D, 15R	63D, 36R	4D, 3R	Howard Metzenbaum (D)	John Glenn (D)	13R, 10D	Carter/ Mondale (D) ✓
1980	Jim Rhodes (R)	vacant	William J. Brown (D)	Anthony J. Celebrezze Jr. (D)	Gertrude W. Donahey (D)	Thomas E. Ferguson (D)	18D, 15R	63D, 36R	4D, 3R	Howard Metzenbaum (D)	John Glenn (D)	13R, 10D	Reagan/ Bush (R) ✓
1981	Jim Rhodes (R)	vacant	William J. Brown (D)	Anthony J. Celebrezze Jr. (D)	Gertrude W. Donahey (D)	Thomas E. Ferguson (D)	18R, 15D	56D, 43R	5D, 2R	Howard Metzenbaum (D)	John Glenn (D)	13R, 10D	Reagan/ Bush (R) ✓
1982	Jim Rhodes (R)	vacant	William J. Brown (D)	Anthony J. Celebrezze Jr. (D)	Gertrude W. Donahey (D)	Thomas E. Ferguson (D)	18R, 15D	56D, 43R	5D, 2R	Howard Metzenbaum (D)	John Glenn (D)	13R, 10D	Reagan/ Bush (R) ✓
1983	Dick Celeste (D)	Myrl Shoemaker (D)	Anthony J. Celebrezze Jr. (D)	Sherrod Brown (D)	Mary Ellen Withrow (D)	Thomas E. Ferguson (D)	17D, 16R	62D, 37R	6D, 1R	Howard Metzenbaum (D)	John Glenn (D)	11R, 10D	Reagan/ Bush (R) ✓
1984	Dick Celeste (D)	Myrl Shoemaker (D)	Anthony J. Celebrezze Jr. (D)	Sherrod Brown (D)	Mary Ellen Withrow (D)	Thomas E. Ferguson (D)	17D, 16R	62D, 37R	6D, 1R	Howard Metzenbaum (D)	John Glenn (D)	11R, 10D	Reagan/ Bush (R) ✓
1985	Dick Celeste (D)	vacant	Anthony J. Celebrezze Jr. (D)	Sherrod Brown (D)	Mary Ellen Withrow (D)	Thomas E. Ferguson (D)	18R, 15D	59D, 40R	4D, 3R	Howard Metzenbaum (D)	John Glenn (D)	11D, 10R	Reagan/ Bush (R) ✓
1986	Dick Celeste (D)	vacant	Anthony J. Celebrezze Jr. (D)	Sherrod Brown (D)	Mary Ellen Withrow (D)	Thomas E. Ferguson (D)	18R, 15D	59D, 40R	4D, 3R	Howard Metzenbaum (D)	John Glenn (D)	11D, 10R	Reagan/ Bush (R) ✓
1987	Dick Celeste (D)	Paul Leonard (D)	Anthony J. Celebrezze Jr. (D)	Sherrod Brown (D)	Mary Ellen Withrow (D)	Thomas E. Ferguson (D)	18R, 15D	60D, 39R	4R, 3D	Howard Metzenbaum (D)	John Glenn (D)	11D, 10R	Reagan/ Bush (R) ✓
1988	Dick Celeste (D)	Paul Leonard (D)	Anthony J. Celebrezze Jr. (D)	Sherrod Brown (D)	Mary Ellen Withrow (D)	Thomas E. Ferguson (D)	18R, 15D	60D, 39R	4R, 3D	Howard Metzenbaum (D)	John Glenn (D)	11D, 10R	Bush/ Quayle (R) ✓
1989	Dick Celeste (D)	Paul Leonard (D)	Anthony J. Celebrezze Jr. (D)	Sherrod Brown (D)	Mary Ellen Withrow (D)	Thomas E. Ferguson (D)	19R, 14D	59D, 40R	4R, 3D	Howard Metzenbaum (D)	John Glenn (D)	11D, 10R	Bush/ Quayle (R) ✓
1990	Dick Celeste (D)	Paul Leonard (D)	Anthony J. Celebrezze Jr. (D)	Sherrod Brown (D)	Mary Ellen Withrow (D)	Thomas E. Ferguson (D)	19R, 14D	59D, 40R	4R, 3D	Howard Metzenbaum (D)	John Glenn (D)	11D, 10R	Bush/ Quayle (R) ✓
1991	George Voinovich (R)	Mike DeWine (R)	Lee Fisher (D)	Bob Taft (R)	Mary Ellen Withrow (D)	Thomas E. Ferguson (D)	21R, 12D	61D, 38R	4R, 3D	Howard Metzenbaum (D)	John Glenn (D)	11D, 10R	Bush/ Quayle (R) ✓
1992	George Voinovich (R)	Mike DeWine (R)	Lee Fisher (D)	Bob Taft (R)	Mary Ellen Withrow (D)	Thomas E. Ferguson (D)	21R, 12D	61D, 38R	4R, 3D	Howard Metzenbaum (D)	John Glenn (D)	11D, 10R	Bill Clinton/ Al Gore (D) ✓
1993	George Voinovich (R)	Mike DeWine (R)	Lee Fisher (D)	Bob Taft (R)	Mary Ellen Withrow (D)	Thomas E. Ferguson (D)	20R, 13D	53D, 46R	4R, 3D	Howard Metzenbaum (D)	John Glenn (D)	10D, 9R	Bill Clinton/ Al Gore (D) ✓
1994	George Voinovich (R)	Mike DeWine (R)	Lee Fisher (D)	Bob Taft (R)	Ken Blackwell (R)	Thomas E. Ferguson (D)	20R, 13D	53D, 46R	4R, 3D	Howard Metzenbaum (D)	John Glenn (D)	10D, 9R	Bill Clinton/ Al Gore (D) ✓
1995	George Voinovich (R)	Nancy Hollister (R)	Betty Montgomery (R)	Bob Taft (R)	Ken Blackwell (R)	Jim Petro (R)	20R, 13D	56R, 43D	5R, 2D	Mike DeWine (R)	John Glenn (D)	13R, 6D	Bill Clinton/ Al Gore (D) ✓
1996	George Voinovich (R)	Nancy Hollister (R)	Betty Montgomery (R)	Bob Taft (R)	Ken Blackwell (R)	Jim Petro (R)	20R, 13D	56R, 43D	5R, 2D	Mike DeWine (R)	John Glenn (D)	13R, 6D	Bill Clinton/ Al Gore (D) ✓
1997	George Voinovich (R)	Nancy Hollister (R)	Betty Montgomery (R)	Bob Taft (R)	Ken Blackwell (R)	Jim Petro (R)	21R, 12D	60R, 39D	5R, 2D	Mike DeWine (R)	John Glenn (D)	11R, 8D	Bill Clinton/ Al Gore (D) ✓
1998	George Voinovich (R)	Nancy Hollister (R)	Betty Montgomery (R)	Bob Taft (R)	Ken Blackwell (R)	Jim Petro (R)	21R, 12D	60R, 39D	5R, 2D	Mike DeWine (R)	John Glenn (D)	11R, 8D	Bill Clinton/ Al Gore (D) ✓
1998	Nancy Hollister (R)	vacant	Betty Montgomery (R)	Bob Taft (R)	Ken Blackwell (R)	Jim Petro (R)	21R, 12D	60R, 39D	5R, 2D	Mike DeWine (R)	John Glenn (D)	11R, 8D	Bill Clinton/ Al Gore (D) ✓
1999	Bob Taft (R)	Maureen O'Connor (R)	Betty Montgomery (R)	Ken Blackwell (R)	Joe Deters (R)	Jim Petro (R)	21R, 12D	59R, 40D	5R, 2D	Mike DeWine (R)	George Voinovich (R)	11R, 8D	Bill Clinton/ Al Gore (D) ✓
2000	Bob Taft (R)	Maureen O'Connor (R)	Betty Montgomery (R)	Ken Blackwell (R)	Joe Deters (R)	Jim Petro (R)	21R, 12D	59R, 40D	5R, 2D	Mike DeWine (R)	George Voinovich (R)	11R, 8D	Bush/ Cheney (R) ✓
2001	Bob Taft (R)	Maureen O'Connor (R)	Betty Montgomery (R)	Ken Blackwell (R)	Joe Deters (R)	Jim Petro (R)	21R, 12D	60R, 39D	5R, 2D	Mike DeWine (R)	George Voinovich (R)	11R, 8D	Bush/ Cheney (R) ✓
2002	Bob Taft (R)	Maureen O'Connor (R)	Betty Montgomery (R)	Ken Blackwell (R)	Joe Deters (R)	Jim Petro (R)	21R, 12D	60R, 39D	5R, 2D	Mike DeWine (R)	George Voinovich (R)	11R, 8D	Bush/ Cheney (R) ✓
2003	Bob Taft (R)	Jennette Bradley (R)	Jim Petro (R)	Ken Blackwell (R)	Joe Deters (R)	Betty Montgomery (R)	22R, 11D	62R, 37D	5R, 2D	Mike DeWine (R)	George Voinovich (R)	12R, 6D	Bush/ Cheney (R) ✓
2004	Bob Taft (R)	Jennette Bradley (R)	Jim Petro (R)	Ken Blackwell (R)	Joe Deters (R)	Betty Montgomery (R)	22R, 11D	62R, 37D	5R, 2D	Mike DeWine (R)	George Voinovich (R)	12R, 6D	Bush/ Cheney (R) ✓
2005	Bob Taft (R)	Jennette Bradley (R)	Jim Petro (R)	Ken Blackwell (R)	Joe Deters (R)	Betty Montgomery (R)	22R, 11D	61R, 38D	6R, 1D	Mike DeWine (R)	George Voinovich (R)	12R, 6D	Bush/ Cheney (R) ✓
2005	Bob Taft (R)	Bruce Johnson (R)	Jim Petro (R)	Ken Blackwell (R)	Jennette Bradley (R)	Betty Montgomery (R)	22R, 11D	61R, 38D	6R, 1D	Mike DeWine (R)	George Voinovich (R)	12R, 6D	Bush/ Cheney (R) ✓
2006	Bob Taft (R)	Bruce Johnson (R)	Jim Petro (R)	Ken Blackwell (R)	Jennette Bradley (R)	Betty Montgomery (R)	22R, 11D	61R, 38D	6R, 1D	Mike DeWine (R)	George Voinovich (R)	12R, 6D	Bush/ Cheney (R) ✓
2007	Ted Strickland (D)	Lee Fisher (D)	Marc Dann (D) (Note: Resigned.)	Jennifer Brunner (D)	Richard Cordray (D) (Note: Resigned following election as state attorney general in November 2008 special election.)	Mary Taylor (R)	21R, 12D	53R, 46D	7R	Sherrod Brown (D)	George Voinovich (R)	11R, 7D	Bush/ Cheney (R) ✓
2008	Ted Strickland (D)	Lee Fisher (D)	Marc Dann (D)	Jennifer Brunner (D)	Richard Cordray (D)	Mary Taylor (R)	21R, 12D	53R, 46D	7R	Sherrod Brown (D)	George Voinovich (R)	11R, 7D	Obama/ Biden (D) ✓
2008	Ted Strickland (D)	Lee Fisher (D)	Tom Winters (D) (Note: As deputy attorney general, acted as attorney general following Dann's resignation.)	Jennifer Brunner (D)	Richard Cordray (D)	Mary Taylor (R)	21R, 12D	53R, 46D	7R	Sherrod Brown (D)	George Voinovich (R)	11R, 7D	Obama/ Biden (D) ✓
2008	Ted Strickland (D)	Lee Fisher (D)	Nancy H. Rogers (D) (Note: Appointed to fill vacancy.)	Jennifer Brunner (D)	Richard Cordray (D)	Mary Taylor (R)	21R, 12D	53R, 46D	7R	Sherrod Brown (D)	George Voinovich (R)	11R, 7D	Obama/ Biden (D) ✓
2009	Ted Strickland (D)	Lee Fisher (D)	Richard Cordray (D) (Note: Elected in November 2008 special election.)	Jennifer Brunner (D)	Kevin Boyce (D)	Mary Taylor (R)	21R, 12D	53D, 46R	7R	Sherrod Brown (D)	George Voinovich (R)	10D, 8R	Obama/ Biden (D) ✓
2010	Ted Strickland (D)	Lee Fisher (D)	Richard Cordray (D)	Jennifer Brunner (D)	Kevin Boyce (D)	Mary Taylor (R)	21R, 12D	53D, 46R	6R, 1D	Sherrod Brown (D)	George Voinovich (R)	10D, 8R	Obama/ Biden (D) ✓
2011	John Kasich (R)	Mary Taylor (R)	Mike DeWine (R)	Jon Husted (R)	Josh Mandel (R)	Dave Yost (R)	23R, 10D	59R, 40D	6R, 1D	Sherrod Brown (D)	Rob Portman (R)	13R, 5D	Obama/ Biden (D) ✓
2012	John Kasich (R)	Mary Taylor (R)	Mike DeWine (R)	Jon Husted (R)	Josh Mandel (R)	Dave Yost (R)	23R, 10D	59R, 40D	6R, 1D	Sherrod Brown (D)	Rob Portman (R)	13R, 5D	Obama/ Biden (D) ✓
2013	John Kasich (R)	Mary Taylor (R)	Mike DeWine (R)	Jon Husted (R)	Josh Mandel (R)	Dave Yost (R)	23R, 10D	60R, 39D	6R, 1D	Sherrod Brown (D)	Rob Portman (R)	12R, 4D	Obama/ Biden (D) ✓
2014	John Kasich (R)	Mary Taylor (R)	Mike DeWine (R)	Jon Husted (R)	Josh Mandel (R)	Dave Yost (R)	23R, 10D	60R, 39D	6R, 1D	Sherrod Brown (D)	Rob Portman (R)	12R, 4D	Obama/ Biden (D) ✓
2015	John Kasich (R)	Mary Taylor (R)	Mike DeWine (R)	Jon Husted (R)	Josh Mandel (R)	Dave Yost (R)	23R, 10D	65R, 34D	6R, 1D	Sherrod Brown (D)	Rob Portman (R)	12R, 4D	Obama/ Biden (D) ✓
2016	John Kasich (R)	Mary Taylor (R)	Mike DeWine (R)	Jon Husted (R)	Josh Mandel (R)	Dave Yost (R)	23R, 10D	65R, 34D	6R, 1D	Sherrod Brown (D)	Rob Portman (R)	12R, 4D	Trump/ Pence (R) ✓
2017	John Kasich (R)	Mary Taylor (R)	Mike DeWine (R)	Jon Husted (R)	Josh Mandel (R)	Dave Yost (R)	24R, 9D	66R, 33D	6R, 1D	Sherrod Brown (D)	Rob Portman (R)	12R, 4D	Trump/ Pence (R) ✓
2018	John Kasich (R)	Mary Taylor (R)	Mike DeWine (R)	Jon Husted (R)	Josh Mandel (R)	Dave Yost (R)	24R, 9D	66R, 33D	7R	Sherrod Brown (D)	Rob Portman (R)	12R, 4D	Trump/ Pence (R) ✓
2019	Mike DeWine (R)	Jon Husted (R)	Dave Yost (R) (Note: Resigning effecting June 7.)	Frank LaRose (R)	Robert Sprague (R)	Keith Faber (R)	24R, 9D	61R, 38D	5R, 2D	Sherrod Brown (D)	Rob Portman (R)	12R, 4D	Trump/ Pence (R) ✓
2020	Mike DeWine (R)	Jon Husted (R)	Dave Yost (R)	Frank LaRose (R)	Robert Sprague (R)	Keith Faber (R)	24R, 9D	61R, 38D	5R, 2D	Sherrod Brown (D)	Rob Portman (R)	12R, 4D	Trump/ Pence (R) ✗
2021	Mike DeWine (R)	Jon Husted (R)	Dave Yost (R)	Frank LaRose (R)	Robert Sprague (R)	Keith Faber (R)	25R, 8D	64R, 35D	4R, 3D	Sherrod Brown (D)	Rob Portman (R)	12R, 4D	Trump/ Pence (R) ✗
2022	Mike DeWine (R)	Jon Husted (R)	Dave Yost (R)	Frank LaRose (R)	Robert Sprague (R)	Keith Faber (R)	25R, 8D	64R, 35D	4R, 3D	Sherrod Brown (D)	Rob Portman (R)	12R, 4D	Trump/ Pence (R) ✗
2023	Mike DeWine (R)	Jon Husted (R)	Dave Yost (R)	Frank LaRose (R)	Robert Sprague (R)	Keith Faber (R)	26R, 7D	67R, 32D	4R, 3D	Sherrod Brown (D)	JD Vance (R) (Note: Resigned to take office as Vice President of the United States.)	10R, 5D	Trump/ Pence (R) ✗
2024	Mike DeWine (R)	Jon Husted (R)	Dave Yost (R)	Frank LaRose (R)	Robert Sprague (R)	Keith Faber (R)	26R, 7D	67R, 32D	4R, 3D	Sherrod Brown (D)	JD Vance (R)	10R, 5D	Trump/ Vance (R) ✓
2025	Mike DeWine (R)	Jim Tressel (R)	Dave Yost (R)	Frank LaRose (R)	Robert Sprague (R)	Keith Faber (R)	24R, 9D	65R, 34D	6R, 1D	Bernie Moreno (R)	Jon Husted (R)	10R, 5D	Trump/ Vance (R) ✓
2026	Mike DeWine (R)	Jim Tressel (R)	Dave Yost (R)	Frank LaRose (R)	Robert Sprague (R)	Keith Faber (R)	24R, 9D	65R, 34D	6R, 1D	Bernie Moreno (R)	Jon Husted (R)	10R, 5D	Trump/ Vance (R) ✓
2026	Mike DeWine (R)	Jim Tressel (R)	Andy Wilson (R)	Frank LaRose (R)	Robert Sprague (R)	Keith Faber (R)	24R, 9D	65R, 34D	6R, 1D	Bernie Moreno (R)	Jon Husted (R)	10R, 5D	Trump/ Vance (R) ✓
2027	Amy Acton (D)	David Pepper (D)	John Kulewicz (D)	Allison Russo (D)	Seth Walsh (D)	Frank LaRose (R)			5R, 2D	Bernie Moreno (R)	Sherrod Brown (D)	8D, 7R	Trump/ Vance (R) ✓

Key to party colors and abbreviations for members of the U.S. Congress and other politicians or officials
Alaskan Independence (AKIP) Know Nothing (KN) American Labor (AL) Anti-Jacksonian (Anti-J); National Republican (NR) Anti-Administration (AA) Anti-Masonic (Anti-M) Conservative (Con) Covenant (Cov)	Democratic (D) Democratic–Farmer–Labor (DFL) Democratic–NPL (D-NPL) Dixiecrat (Dix), States' Rights (SR) Democratic-Republican (DR) Farmer–Labor (FL) Federalist (F); Pro-Administration (PA)	Free Soil (FS) Fusion (Fus) Greenback (GB) Independence (IPM) Jacksonian (J) Liberal (Lib) Libertarian (L) National Union (NU)	Nonpartisan League (NPL) Nullifier (N) Opposition Northern (O); Opposition Southern (O) Populist (Pop) Progressive (Prog) Prohibition (Proh) Readjuster (Rea)	Republican (R) Silver (Sv) Silver Republican (SvR) Socialist (Soc) Union (U) Unconditional Union (UU) Vermont Progressive (VP) Whig (W)	Independent (I) Nonpartisan (NP)

== See also ==
- Elections in Ohio
- Political demographics and history in Ohio
- Politics of Ohio
