= Senator Kirby (disambiguation) =

William F. Kirby (1867–1934) was a U.S. Senator from Arkansas from 1916 to 1921. Senator Kirby may also refer to:

- Dean Kirby (born 1946), Mississippi State Senate
- Edward P. Kirby (1928–2017), Massachusetts State Senate
- Micajah W. Kirby (1798–1882), New York State Senate
- Moses H. Kirby (1798–1889), Ohio State Senate
