= John P. Brennan =

American politician (1864–1943)

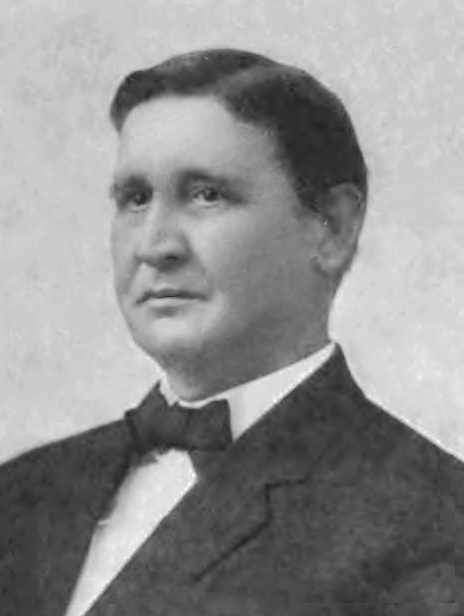

Ohio State Treasurer
- In office January 13, 1913 – January 11, 1915
- Governor: James M. Cox
- Preceded by: David S. Creamer
- Succeeded by: Rudolph W. Archer

Personal details
- Born: October 20, 1864; Urbana, Ohio, US
- Died: October 14, 1943 (aged 78); Columbus, Ohio, US
- Political party: Democratic

John P. Brennan (October 20, 1864 – October 14, 1943) was a Democratic politician in the U.S. state of Ohio who served as Ohio State Treasurer 1913 to 1915.

== Biography ==
Brennan was born at Urbana, Champaign County, Ohio, in 1864, and attended public and parochial schools in that city. At age 21, he was nominated for recorder of Champaign County by the Democratic Party. He was a member of the Democratic Central Committee for ten years, and chairman of the Champaign Democratic Executive Committee for ten years.

Brennan was a member of the State Democratic Executive Committee for four years, and State Central Committee for the four years. He was a member of Urbana City Council for ten years. He was First Deputy State Fire Marshal for two years, then was appointed Cashier of the State Treasury in 1909 by fellow Democrat State Treasurer David S. Creamer. He won election for Treasurer in 1912, and began his term January, 1913.

Brennan died October 14, 1943, at Columbus.

Political offices
Preceded by David S. Creamer	Treasurer of Ohio; 1913–1915	Succeeded by Chester E. Bryan
