= William Stanbery =

American politician (1788–1823)

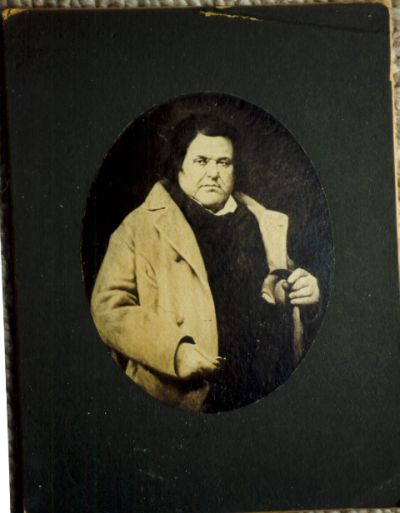

Member of the U.S. House of Representatives from Ohio's 8th district
- In office October 9, 1827 – March 3, 1833
- Preceded by: William Wilson
- Succeeded by: Jeremiah McLene

Member of the Ohio Senate
- In office 1824–1825

Personal details
- Born: August 10, 1788 Essex County, New Jersey
- Died: January 23, 1873 (aged 84) Newark, Ohio
- Party: Jacksonian (Before 1827); Anti-Jacksonian (1824–1834)
- Relatives: Henry Stanbery (brother)

William Stanbery (August 10, 1788 – January 23, 1873) was an American attorney and politician who was a U.S. representative from Ohio from 1827 to 1833.

== U.S. House of Representatives ==
Stanbery was elected a Jacksonian to the United States House of Representatives in 1827 to fill the vacancy caused by the death of William Wilson. He was reelected as a Jacksonian in 1828 and as an Anti-Jacksonian in 1830.

He was caned by Sam Houston on Pennsylvania Avenue. Houston was reprimanded in the House of Representatives.

== Personal life ==
Stanbery was married to Mary Shipley of New York City on June 14, 1809, in New York City. They had seven children.

Stanbery's half-brother, Henry Stanbery, was United States Attorney General under Andrew Johnson and resigned to defend Johnson during his impeachment trial.

U.S. House of Representatives
| Preceded by William Wilson | Member of the U.S. House of Representatives from Ohio's 8th congressional district 1827–1833 | Succeeded by Jeremiah McLene |
