= John G. Price =

American lawyer (1871–1930)

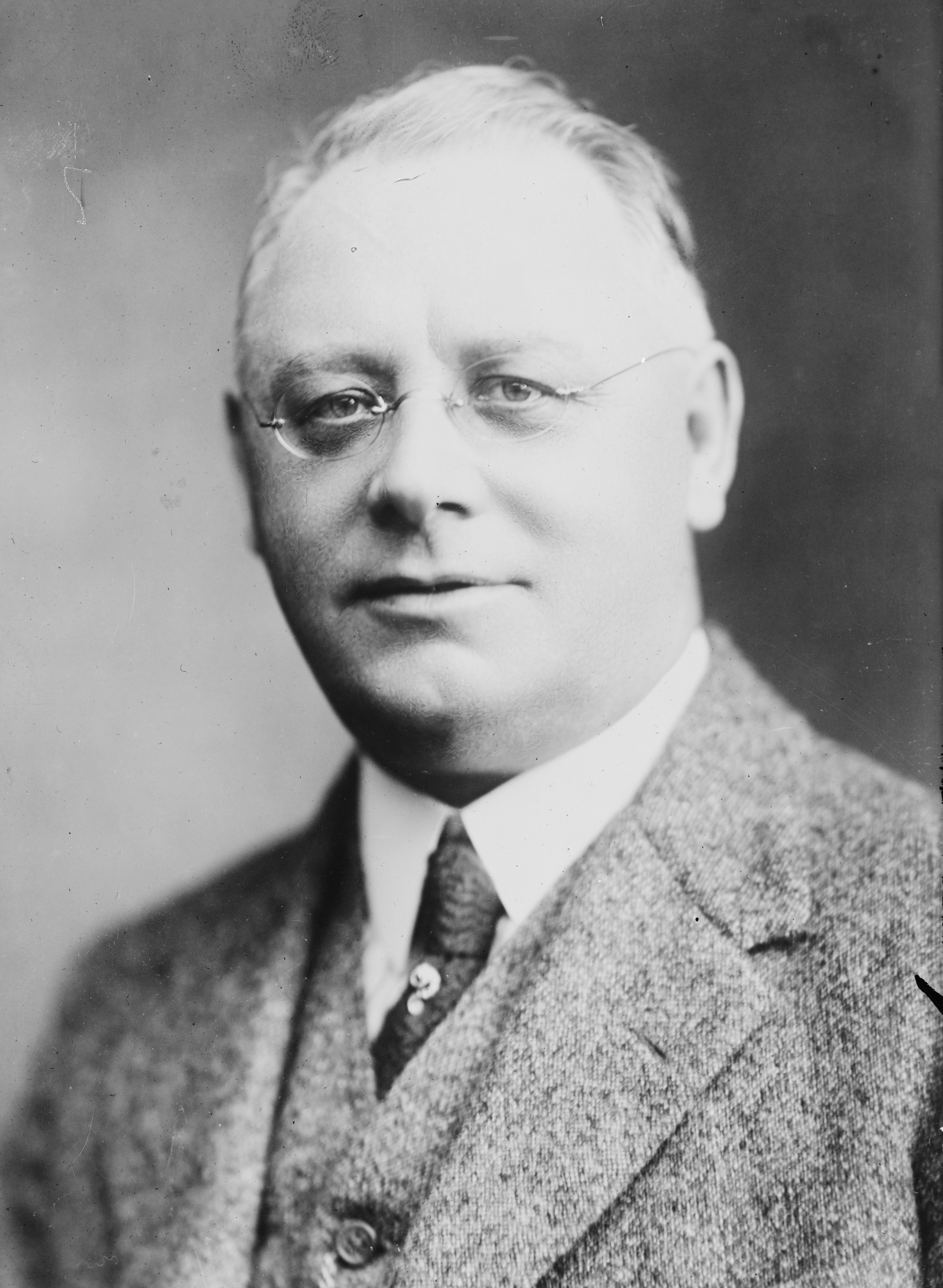

28th Ohio Attorney General
- In office January 13, 1919 – January 8, 1923
- Governor: James M. Cox; Harry L. Davis
- Preceded by: Joseph McGhee
- Succeeded by: Charles C. Crabbe

Personal details
- Born: August 10, 1871 Canton, Ohio, U.S.
- Died: November 23, 1930 (aged 59) Columbus, Ohio, U.S.
- Resting place: St. Joseph's Cemetery
- Party: Republican
- Spouse: Salome C. Royer (m. 1904)
- Children: 3
- Education: Georgetown University Law Center

John G. Price (August 10, 1871 – November 23, 1930) was a Republican lawyer from the U.S. state of Ohio who served as Ohio Attorney General 1919–1923.

== Biography ==
John G. Price was born in Stark County, Ohio, and graduated from high school in Canton. He became a letter carrier at an early age, and his patrons included William McKinley, later Governor and President. McKinley arranged for Price to be transferred to the postal service in Washington, D.C. There he attended night school at Georgetown University, and earned a law degree.

Price moved to Columbus, Ohio, where he practiced. He was special counsel in the office of the Franklin County prosecuting attorney, and in the office of Ohio Attorney General Edward C. Turner. In 1918, Price was elected Attorney General, and was re-elected in 1920, serving four years.

In 1904, Price was married to Salome C. Royer, and had three children: John G. Price, Jr., Salome Kathleen Price Reinhard, and Richard Royer Price.

Price was exalted ruler of Columbus Lodge No. 37, B.P.O.E. and was elected grand exalted ruler for 1924–25 at the Boston annual convention. He was also grand knight of the Knights of Columbus.

Price died of a cerebral hemorrhage on November 23, 1930, at his home in Columbus. He was buried in St. Joseph's Cemetery.

Legal offices
Preceded by Joseph McGhee	Attorney General of Ohio; 1919–1923	Succeeded by Charles C. Crabbe
