= William Wilson (Ohio politician) =

Ohio politician (1773–1827)

Member of the U.S. House of Representatives from Ohio's 8th district
- In office March 4, 1823 – June 6, 1827
- Preceded by: New district
- Succeeded by: William Stanbery

Personal details
- Born: William Wilson; March 19, 1773 New Boston, Province of New Hampshire, British America
- Died: June 6, 1827 (aged 54) Newark, Ohio, US
- Resting place: Cedar Hill Cemetery
- Party: Democratic Republican; Adams
- Education: Dartmouth College

William Wilson (March 19, 1773 – June 6, 1827) was a 19th-century American lawyer and politician who served two terms as a U.S. representative from Ohio from 1823 to 1827.

== Biography ==
Born in New Boston in the Province of New Hampshire, Wilson attended the public schools and was graduated from Dartmouth College, Hanover, New Hampshire, in 1797. He studied law in Johnstown, New York, and was admitted to the bar.

=== Early career ===
He moved to Ohio and settled in Chillicothe about 1805. He engaged in the practice of law there before moving to Newark, Ohio in 1808, having been appointed chief judge of the court of common pleas, and served until 1823.

He was elected a member of the American Antiquarian Society in 1818.

=== Congress ===
Wilson was elected to the 18th, 19th, and 20th Congresses, serving from March 4, 1823, until his death in Newark, Ohio on June 6, 1827. He served as chairman of the Committee on Expenditures in the Post Office Department in the 19th Congress.

=== Death ===
Wilson died on June 6, 1827 and was interred in the Old Cemetery and was re-interred on March 23, 1853, in Cedar Hill Cemetery.

== See also ==
- List of members of the United States Congress who died in office (1790–1899)

== Sources ==
- United States Congress. "William Wilson (id: W000619)". Biographical Directory of the United States Congress.

U.S. House of Representatives
New district	Representative from Ohio's 8th congressional district 1823-03-04 – 1827-06-06	Succeeded by William Stanbery
Legal offices
New title	President Judge of the Ohio Court of Common Pleas; 4th Judicial Circuit; 1808–1822	Succeeded by Alexander Harper
