= David S. Creamer =

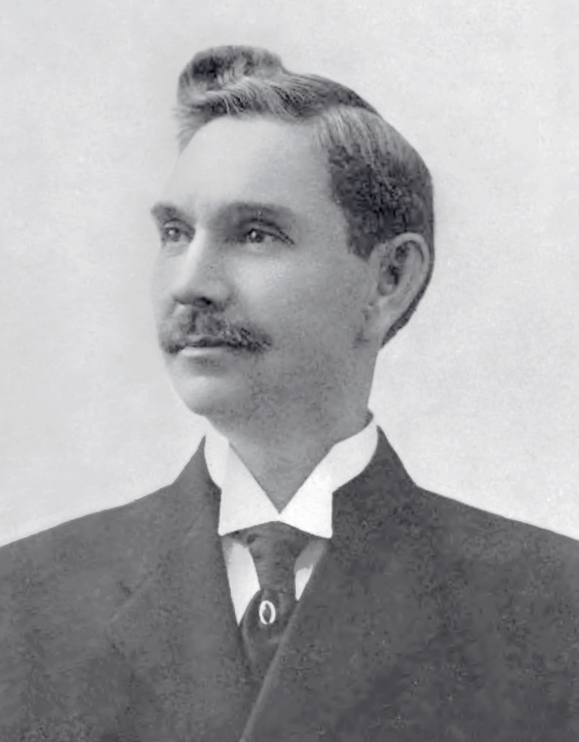

Ohio State Treasurer
- In office January 11, 1909 – January 13, 1913
- Governor: Judson Harmon
- Preceded by: Charles C. Green
- Succeeded by: John P. Brennan

Personal details
- Born: September 3, 1858 Belmont County, Ohio
- Died: November 17, 1946 (aged 88) Columbus, Ohio
- Resting place: Union Cemetery, St. Clairsville, Ohio
- Party: Democratic
- Spouse: Gertrude Rebecca Fowler
- Children: four

David S. Creamer (September 3, 1858 – November 17, 1946) was an Ohio politician. He was state treasurer from 1909 to 1913, state fire marshal and Columbus City Treasurer, among other positions.

== Political career ==
One of David's early childhood heroes was Ross J. Alexander, and Creamer's first political experience was pulling a sleigh carrying voters at the time of Alexander's running for the United States Congress. Creamer's early political career began when he was elected School Director, as well as serving as a township clerk (for Mead Township, Belmont County), being a member of the township Democratic committee and also serving for three years as manager of the Belmont Agricultural Association. In 1892 he accepted the position of Belmont County recorder, a task that many people saw as impossible. He did an excellent job at this position and was re-elected in 1894. On June 1, 1906, Creamer accepted appointment to the position of state fire marshal, during the early part of the administration of then Gov. John M. Pattison. In April, 1908 he was nominated by the Democratic State Convention for state treasurer, the only other Democrat besides Gov. Judson Harmon on the ticket. Creamer served as state treasurer from 1909 until his second term as treasurer expired on January 13, 1913. Two years later in March 1915, he was appointed a member of the Ohio State Board of Administration by Gov. Frank Willis. This board was in charge of the twenty-two state institutions for Ohio. After his political career Creamer continued to live in Columbus, where he was involved in the real estate business and was elected City Treasurer of Columbus in 1930.

== Family life ==
Creamer was born David Staley Creamer on September 3, 1858, on his family's homestead in Key, Belmont County, Ohio to David Jackson (1829–1911) and Amanda Masters Creamer (1835–1867). The homestead was first purchased by his grandfather, the original David Creamer (1777–1865), an early settler of Ohio, around 1815. Besides an older brother Zadock, he had 2 younger sisters, Emma and Carrie. Creamer lost his mom when he was just 8 years old, and consequently his father remarried in 1869 to Margaret Haines.

Mr. Creamer was married to Gertrude Rebecca Fowler (1874–1944) on October 16, 1890, in Bellaire, Ohio. They had 4 kids, Lorena Verdell [Creamer] McClure, Effie Marie Creamer, David Harold Creamer and Genevieve Fowler Creamer; and six grandchildren, one of whom, Kenneth D. McClure (1921–2000), would later be Mayor of Bexley, Ohio. Creamer resided in Columbus for the rest of his life, living to be 88 years old, and died there on November 17, 1946. He was buried in his family's plot at Union Cemetery in St. Clairsville, Ohio. Source Citation: Year: 1920; Census Place: Columbus Ward 16, Franklin, Ohio; Roll: T625_1383; Page: 5B; Enumeration District: 265; Image: 835.

Political offices
Preceded by Charles C. Green	Treasurer of Ohio; 1909–1913	Succeeded by John P. Brennan
