= Jeremiah McLene =

American politician (1767–1837)

Member of the U.S. House of Representatives from Ohio's 8th district
- In office March 4, 1833 – March 3, 1837
- Preceded by: William Stanbery
- Succeeded by: Joseph Ridgway

2nd Ohio Secretary of State
- In office December 1808 – January 1831
- Governor: Samuel Huntington; Return J. Meigs Jr. Othniel Looker; Thomas Worthington; Ethan Allen Brown; Allen Trimble; Jeremiah Morrow; Allen Trimble; Duncan McArthur
- Preceded by: William Creighton, Jr.
- Succeeded by: Moses H. Kirby

Personal details
- Born: 1767 Cumberland County, Province of Pennsylvania, British America
- Died: March 19, 1837 (aged 69–70) Washington, D.C., U.S.
- Resting place: Congressional Cemetery
- Party: Jacksonian

Jeremiah McLene (1767 – March 19, 1837) was a U.S. representative from Ohio from 1833 to 1837, major general of militia in the American Revolutionary War, the 2nd Ohio secretary of state from 1808 to 1831, and a state representative from 1807 to 1808. He served as a Democrat.

== Early life ==
McLene was born in Cumberland County in the Province of Pennsylvania in 1767. As a youth he attended the common schools. During the Revolution he served in the militia at a very young age and rose to the rank of major general by the war's end in 1783.

== Political career ==
After the war he moved west to settle in Chillicothe, Ohio. By 1806, he had been elected to the Ohio House of Representatives as a Democrat. He became Secretary of State in 1808 and served eight terms until 1831. During this time, in 1816, he moved north to Columbus, Ohio. Ohio Presidential elector in 1832 for Andrew Jackson. In 1832 he was elected to the United States House of Representatives for the Ohio's 8th congressional district and served two terms. He lost re-election to a third term in 1836 to a Whig, Joseph Ridgway.

== Death ==
McLene died in Washington, D.C., on March 19, 1837, at age 70, before he could move back to Columbus. He is interred in the United States Congressional Cemetery.

== Notes ==
Political offices
Preceded by William Creighton, Jr.	Ohio Secretary of State; 1808–1831	Succeeded by Moses H. Kirby
Ohio House of Representatives
Preceded by James Dunlap; Nathaniel Massie; David Shelby; Abraham J. Williams	Representative from Ross, Franklin, and Highland Counties; 1807–1808; Served alongside: Elias Langham, William Lewis, Thomas Worthington	District eliminated
U.S. House of Representatives
Preceded by William Stanbery	United States Representative from Ohio's 8th congressional district 1833–1837	Succeeded by Joseph Ridgway
