= Charles C. Crabbe =

American politician

Charles Carl Crabbe
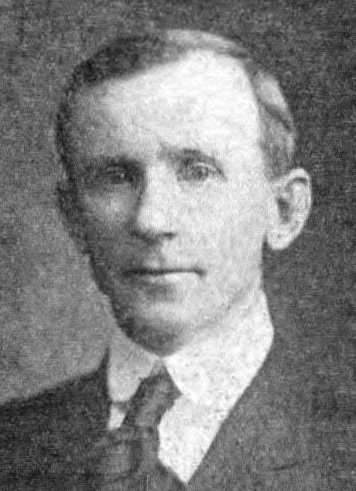

29th Ohio Attorney General
- In office January 8, 1923 – January 10, 1927
- Governor: A. Victor Donahey
- Preceded by: John G. Price
- Succeeded by: Edward C. Turner

Personal details
- Born: November 1, 1878 Madison County, Ohio, U.S.
- Died: June 2, 1969 (aged 90) Columbus, Ohio, U.S.
- Party: Republican
- Education: Pettit College of Law

Charles Carl Crabbe (November 1, 1878 – June 2, 1969) was a lawyer from the U.S. state of Ohio who was a legislator in the Ohio House of Representatives and served as Ohio Attorney General 1923–1927.

== Biography ==
Charles C. Crabbe was born on a farm in Madison County, Ohio in 1878, and educated in country schools. He taught school and studied law for seven years, and completed his law studies at Ohio Northern University College of Law in Ada, Ohio.

Crabbe was admitted to the bar in 1904, and practiced in Madison County. He served three terms as Madison County Prosecuting Attorney. He was elected to the Ohio House of Representatives in 1918 as a Republican, and served two terms. He later was elected to two terms as Ohio Attorney General.

Crabbe married Ida M. Roth on September 22, 1904, at London, Ohio. They had a son named John Roth Crabbe. Charles Crabbe died at Columbus, Ohio, June 2, 1969.

Political offices
| Preceded by John G. Price | Ohio Attorney General; January 8, 1923-January 10, 1927 | Succeeded by Edward C. Turner |
Ohio House of Representatives
| Preceded by L. R. Kious | Representative from Madison County; January 6, 1919-January 1, 1923 | Succeeded by R. C. Rea |
