= George S. Myers (judge) =

American judge

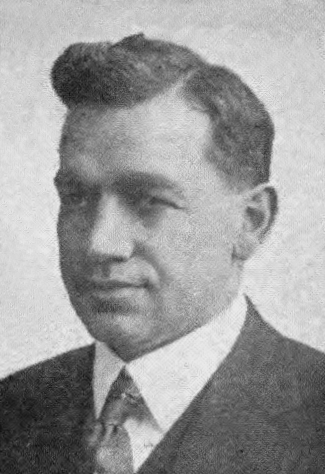
- circa 1920

Associate Justice of the Ohio Supreme Court
- In office January 1, 1937 – May 9, 1940
- Preceded by: Will P. Stephenson
- Succeeded by: Edward C. Turner

37th Ohio Secretary of State
- In office January 9, 1933 – December 31, 1936
- Governor: George White; Martin L. Davey
- Preceded by: Clarence J. Brown
- Succeeded by: William J. Kennedy

Personal details
- Born: April 21, 1881 Rising Sun, Ohio, U.S.
- Died: May 9, 1940 (aged 59) Columbus, Ohio, U.S.
- Resting place: Trinity Cemetery, Rising Sun
- Party: Democratic
- Spouse: Louise Birch
- Children: 2
- Education: College of Wooster; Western Reserve University School of Law

George S. Myers (April 21, 1881 – May 9, 1940) was a Democratic lawyer from Cleveland, Ohio, in the United States, who served in all three branches of the Ohio state government. He served two terms in the Ohio House of Representatives, two terms as Ohio Secretary of State, and finished his life as a judge on the Ohio Supreme Court.

== Biography ==
George S. Myers was born in 1881 in Rising Sun, Sandusky County, Ohio to Albert and Hanna Neucome Myers. He was educated in public schools, and began teaching at age 16. He taught for six years, and entered the College of Wooster in 1903. He began legal studies at Western Reserve Franklin Thomas Backus School of Law in 1907, graduated in 1910, and was admitted to the bar in Ohio that year.

From 1910 to 1932, Myers practiced law in Cleveland, Ohio. For three years, he was dance-hall inspector in Cleveland. In 1916 and 1918 he was elected to the Ohio House of Representatives from Cuyahoga County. After leaving the House in 1921, he returned to private practice in Cleveland. Myers failed in a bid for Ohio's 20th congressional district in 1922. He also lost election in 1928 for Lieutenant Governor of Ohio. In 1930, he entered the Democratic primary for the United States Senate, but again lost. November, 1932 he was elected to Ohio Secretary of State, seated January 9, 1933, and was re-elected in 1934.

Myers was encouraged to run for Ohio Governor in 1936, but instead ran for a full six-year term on the Ohio Supreme Court. He won, and was the first candidate for the Supreme Court to win more than one million votes. He was seated January 1, 1937, and served the rest of his life.

Myers worked a full day at the court May 9, 1940, went home, had a heart attack, and died. He was a Lutheran, but had his funeral at Trinity Episcopal Church (Columbus, Ohio). He was buried at Trinity Cemetery in Rising Sun.

Myers married Louise Birch of Lexington, Kentucky in 1915, and they had two children. He was a member of the Knights of Pythias.

Political offices
Preceded by Clarence J. Brown	Secretary of State of Ohio; 1933–1936	Succeeded by William J. Kennedy
