= Harry S. Day =

Harry Sanderson Day
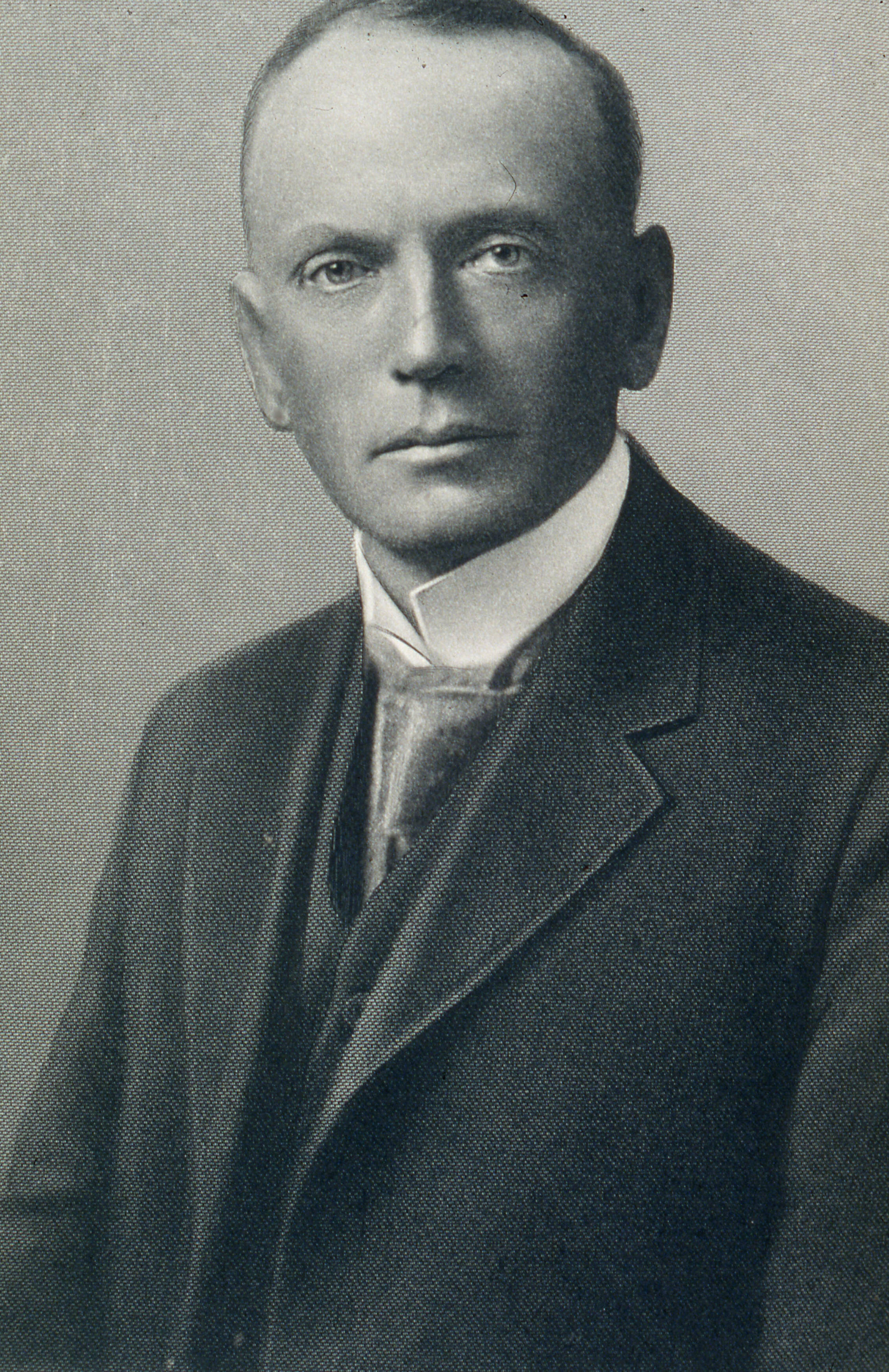
- Day c. 1922

Ohio State Treasurer
- In office January 8, 1923 – January 10, 1927
- Governor: A. Victor Donahey
- Preceded by: Rudolph W. Archer
- Succeeded by: Bert B. Buckley
- In office January 12, 1931 – January 11, 1937
- Governor: George White; Martin L. Davey
- Preceded by: Edwin A. Todd
- Succeeded by: Clarence K. Knisley

Personal details
- Born: May 16, 1871 Fremont, Ohio
- Died: June 27, 1956 (aged 85) Fremont, Ohio
- Party: Republican
- Spouse: Lola Garvin
- Children: Mary Elizabeth
- Education: Oberlin College; Otterbein College

Harry Sanderson Day (May 16, 1871 – June 27, 1956) was a Republican politician in the U.S. state of Ohio who served as Ohio State Treasurer 1923–1927 and 1931–1937. He also ran unsuccessfully for his party's nomination for Ohio Governor.

== Biography ==
Harry S. Day was born in Fremont, Sandusky County, Ohio in 1871 to John and Emily (Williams) Day. He was educated in the Fremont public schools, and worked for the railway mail service until 1891.

In 1891 Day enrolled in Oberlin College, Oberlin, Ohio, and also attended Otterbein College in Westerville, Ohio. He married Lola Garvin in 1901, and had a daughter named Mary Elizabeth. Day was named Deputy Postmaster in 1906, and continued until 1915. In 1919 he became president of the Ohio Nursery Association, and operated a nursery for many years.

Day served two terms as mayor of Fremont, 1918-1921. He was elected Ohio State Treasurer in 1922 and re-elected in 1924. He was unsuccessful in a run for the Republican nomination for Ohio Governor in 1926. In 1930 he was again elected Treasurer, serving 1931-1937.

Day was a director of the Fremont Federal Savings and Loan Company, and was president of the Liberty Banking Company until his retirement in 1955. He lived in Fremont in his later years at 1215 Birchard Ave. He died at Fremont Memorial Hospital June 27, 1956.

== External sources ==
- photo of Day from 1925

Political offices
Preceded by Rudolph W. Archer	Treasurer of Ohio; 1923–1927	Succeeded by Bert B. Buckley
Preceded by Edwin A. Todd	Treasurer of Ohio; 1931–1937	Succeeded by Clarence H. Knisley
