= Rudolph W. Archer =

American politician (1869–1932)

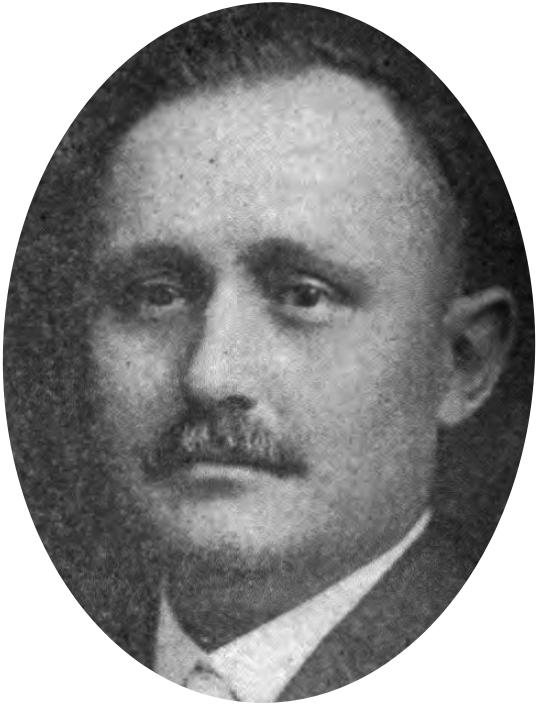

Ohio State Treasurer
- In office January 11, 1915 – January 8, 1917
- Governor: Frank B. Willis
- Preceded by: John P. Brennan
- Succeeded by: Chester E. Bryan
- In office January 13, 1919 – January 8, 1923
- Governor: James M. Cox
- Preceded by: Chester E. Bryan
- Succeeded by: Harry S. Day

Personal details
- Born: September 20, 1869 Bellaire, Ohio
- Died: January 14, 1932 (aged 62) Bellaire, Ohio
- Party: Republican

Rudolph W. Archer (September 20, 1869 – January 14, 1932) was a Republican politician in the U.S. state of Ohio who was Ohio State Treasurer 1915–1917 and 1919–1923.

== Biography ==
Rudolph W. Archer was born in Bellaire, Belmont County, Ohio in 1869. He dropped out of school at age ten to help support the family. He worked in a glass factory, and learned business. He was nominated for county treasurer twice by the Republican Party, and twice elected.

Archer was first elected State Treasurer of Ohio in 1914, and served a two-year term. In 1916, he was defeated by Democrat Chester E. Bryan. In 1918 and 1920, he was elected twice more for State Treasurer.

Political offices
Preceded by John P. Brennan	Treasurer of Ohio; 1915–1917	Succeeded by Chester E. Bryan
Preceded by Chester E. Bryan	Treasurer of Ohio; 1919–1923	Succeeded by Harry S. Day
