= Joseph McGhee =

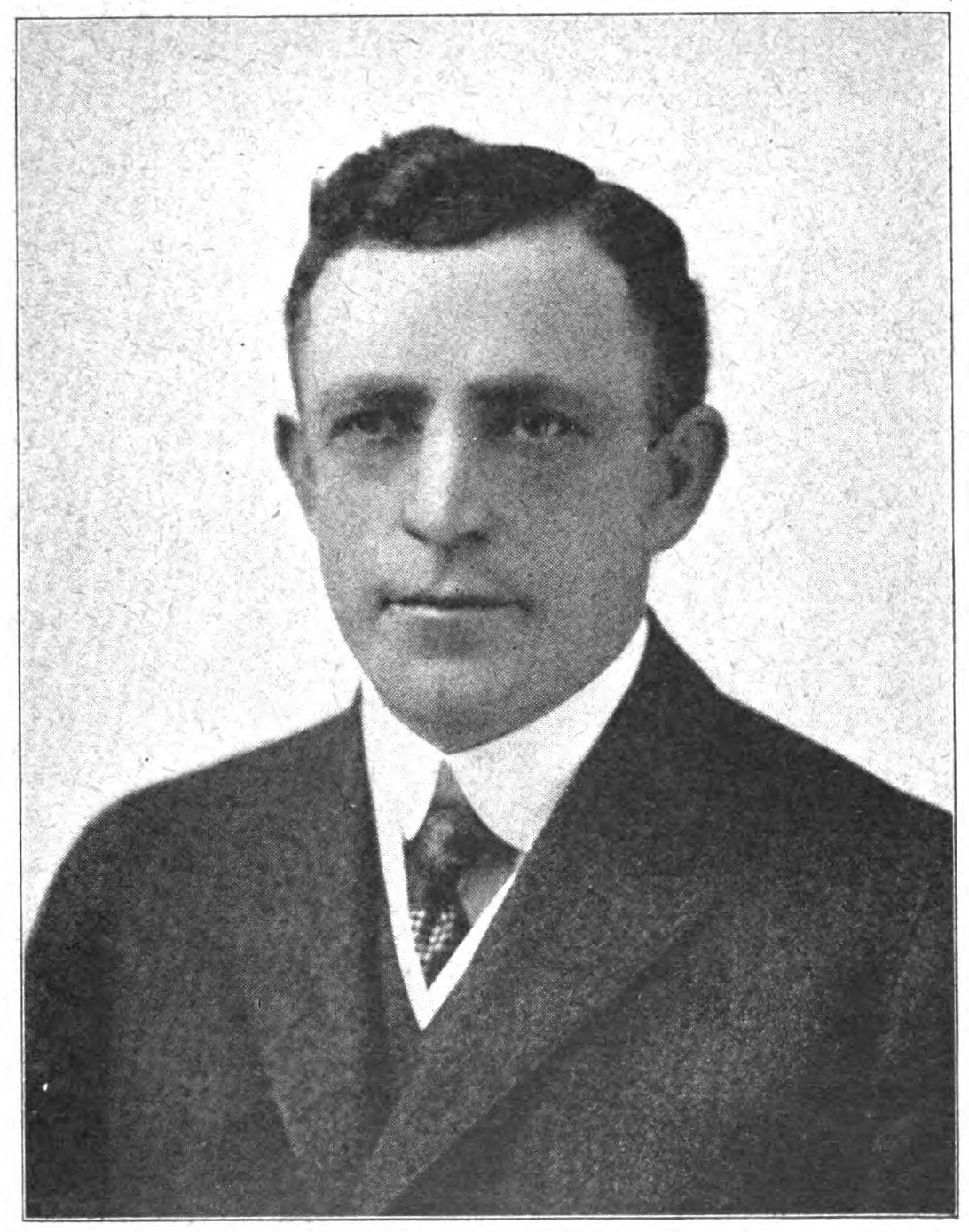

27th Ohio Attorney General
- In office January 8, 1917 – January 13, 1919
- Governor: James M. Cox
- Preceded by: Edward C. Turner
- Succeeded by: John G. Price

Personal details
- Born: October 6, 1872 Coalton, Ohio, U.S.
- Died: November 27, 1951 (aged 79) Columbus, Ohio, U.S.
- Resting place: Fairmount Cemetery, Jackson, Ohio
- Party: Democratic
- Spouse: Margaret Becker
- Education: National Normal University

Joseph McGhee (October 6, 1872 – November 27, 1951) was a Democratic politician in the U.S. state of Ohio who was Ohio Attorney General 1917–1919.

== Biography ==
Joseph McGhee was born at Coalton, Jackson County, Ohio, where he attended the public schools. He graduated from National Normal University in Lebanon, Ohio in 1895. He taught school, and studied law with Judge James Tripp at Jackson, Ohio, and was admitted to the bar at Columbus in 1898. He then practiced at Jackson. In 1902 he was married to Margaret Becker of Logan, Ohio.

In 1911, fellow Jackson County Democratic attorney Timothy S. Hogan became Ohio Attorney General, and McGhee was appointed his first assistant. He held that position until October, 1913, when Hogan appointed him Advisory Counsel to the State Utilities Commission, where he served until January 11, 1915.

Immediately after resigning at the Utilities Commission, McGhee associated with Frank Davis, Jr. and James I. Boulger in law practice at Columbus as McGhee, Davis & Boulger. He won election for Attorney General in 1916, and was inducted January 8, 1917.

McGhee died at his Columbus home in 1951. He had been in declining health for the previous two years. He was 79. His wife had predeceased him in 1940.

Legal offices
Preceded by Edward C. Turner	Attorney General of Ohio; 1917–1919	Succeeded by John G. Price
