= Benjamin B. Hinkson =

American politician

4th Ohio Secretary of State
- In office 1834 – February 12, 1836
- Governor: Robert Lucas
- Preceded by: Moses H. Kirby
- Succeeded by: Carter B. Harlan

Personal details
- Born: circa 1799 Cynthiana, Kentucky
- Died: March 1877 Clinton County, Ohio

Benjamin B. Hinkson (c. 1799 - March 1877) was the fourth Ohio Secretary of State.

== Biography ==
Benjamin B. Hinkson was born in Cynthiana, Kentucky in about 1799. He was the son of judge Thomas Hinkson, and moved to Clinton County, Ohio with his father. He was deputy clerk of the court for Fayette County, and was admitted to the bar and began practice in Wilmington, Ohio in 1820, which continued until he was elected Ohio Secretary of State.

Hinkson was elected to the Ohio House of Representatives in 1826, 1827 1829, 1830 and 1833. During the 1833-1834 session, the legislature elected him as Secretary of State. He served until he resigned February 12, 1836.

In 1836, Hinkson was elected president judge of the Court of Common Pleas for the district of Clinton, Warren, Butler, and Greene counties. He served a term of seven years, and returned to private practice.

In 1852, Hinkson retired from law practice and engaged in stock raising on his farm. He died of paralysis in his 78th year in March, 1877.

Political offices
Preceded by Moses H. Kirby	Ohio Secretary of State; 1834-1836	Succeeded by Carter B. Harlan
Ohio House of Representatives
Preceded by Richard Fallis	Representative from Clinton County; December 4, 1826-November 30, 1828	Succeeded by Thomas Hibben
Preceded by Thomas Hibben	Representative from Clinton County; December 7, 1829-December 4, 1831	Succeeded by Eli Gaskill
Preceded by Eli Gaskill	Representative from Clinton County; December 2, 1833-1834	Succeeded by Carter B. Harlan
