= 2012 Ohio elections =

- 2012

The 2012 Ohio elections were held on November 6, 2012, in the U.S. state of Ohio. Primary elections were held on March 6, 2012.

== Federal ==
=== President ===
Voters chose 18 electors to represent them in the Electoral College.

2012 United States presidential election in Ohio
Party	Candidate	Votes	%	±%
Democratic	Barack Obama (incumbent)	2,827,709	50.58	▼0.80
Republican	Mitt Romney	2,661,437	47.60	▲0.80
Libertarian	Gary Johnson	49,493	0.89	▲0.54
Green	Jill Stein	18,573	0.33	▲0.18
Independent	Richard Duncan	12,502	0.22	
Constitution	Virgil Goode	8,152	0.15	▼0.07
Socialist	Stewart Alexander	2,967	0.05	
Write-in		23	0.00	
Majority		166,272	2.97	▲1.61
Total votes		5,590,934	100.00	
Democratic win				

=== Senate ===
2012 United States Senate election in Ohio
Party	Candidate	Votes	%	±%
Democratic	Sherrod Brown (incumbent)	2,762,766	50.70	▼5.46
Republican	Josh Mandel	2,435,744	44.70	▲0.88
Independent	Scott Rupert	250,618	4.60	▲4.58
Majority		327,022	6.00	▼6.34
Total votes		5,449,128	100.00	
Democratic hold				

=== House ===
District	Incumbent			This race	
District	Member	Party	First elected	Results	Candidates
Ohio 1	Steve Chabot	Republican	2010	Incumbent re-elected.	✓ Steve Chabot (Republican) 57.7%; Jeff Sinnard (Democratic) 37.6%; Jim Berns (Libertarian) 2.8%; Rich Stevenson (Green) 1.9%
Ohio 2	Jean Schmidt	Republican	2005 (Special)	Incumbent lost renomination New member elected. Republican hold.	✓ Brad Wenstrup (Republican) 58.6%; William R. Smith (Democratic) 41.4%
Ohio 3	None (New seat)			New seat. New member elected. Democratic gain.	✓ Joyce Beatty (Democratic) 68.3%; Chris Long (Republican) 26.3%; Richard Ehrbar (Libertarian) 3.2%; Bob Fitrakis (Green) 2.2%
Ohio 4	Jim Jordan	Republican	2006	Incumbent re-elected.	✓ Jim Jordan (Republican) 58.3%; Jim Slone (Democratic) 36.5%; Chris Calla (Libertarian) 5.2%
Ohio 5	Bob Latta	Republican	2007 (Special)	Incumbent re-elected.	✓ Bob Latta (Republican) 57.3%; Angela Zimmann (Democratic) 39.2%; Eric Eberly (Libertarian) 3.5%
Ohio 6	Bill Johnson	Republican	2010	Incumbent re-elected.	✓ Bill Johnson (Republican) 53.2%; Charlie Wilson (Democratic) 46.8%
Ohio 7	Bob Gibbs	Republican	2010	Incumbent re-elected.	✓ Bob Gibbs (Republican) 56.4%; Joyce Healy-Abrams (Democratic) 43.6%
Ohio 8	John Boehner	Republican	1990	Incumbent re-elected.	✓ John Boehner (Republican) 99.2%
Ohio 9	Marcy Kaptur	Democratic	1982	Incumbent re-elected.	✓ Marcy Kaptur (Democratic) 73.1%; Samuel Wurzelbacher (Republican) 23.0%; Sean Stipe (Libertarian) 3.9%
Ohio 9	Dennis Kucinich; Redistricted from the 10th district	Democratic	1996	Incumbent lost renomination. Democratic loss.	✓ Marcy Kaptur (Democratic) 73.1%; Samuel Wurzelbacher (Republican) 23.0%; Sean Stipe (Libertarian) 3.9%
Ohio 10	Mike Turner	Republican	2002	Incumbent re-elected.	✓ Mike Turner (Republican) 59.5%; Sharen Neuhardt (Democratic) 37.5%; David Harlow (Libertarian) 3.0%
Ohio 10	Steve Austria; Redistricted from the 7th district	Republican	2008	Incumbent retired. Republican loss.	✓ Mike Turner (Republican) 59.5%; Sharen Neuhardt (Democratic) 37.5%; David Harlow (Libertarian) 3.0%
Ohio 11	Marcia Fudge	Democratic	2008	Incumbent re-elected.	✓ Marcia Fudge (Democratic) 100.0%
Ohio 12	Pat Tiberi	Republican	2000	Incumbent re-elected.	✓ Pat Tiberi (Republican) 63.5%; Jim Reese (Democratic) 36.5%
Ohio 13	Tim Ryan	Democratic	2002	Incumbent re-elected.	✓ Tim Ryan (Democratic) 72.8%; Marisha Agana (Republican) 27.2%
Ohio 14	Steve LaTourette	Republican	1994	Incumbent retired. New member elected. Republican hold.	✓ David Joyce (Republican) 54.0%; Dale Virgil Blanchard (Democratic) 38.7%; Elaine Mastromatteo (Green) 3.9%; David Macko (Libertarian) 3.4%
Ohio 15	Steve Stivers	Republican	2010	Incumbent re-elected.	✓ Steve Stivers (Republican) 61.6%; Pat Lang (Democratic) 38.4%
Ohio 16	Jim Renacci	Republican	2010	Incumbent re-elected.	✓ Jim Renacci (Republican) 52.0%; Betty Sutton (Democratic) 48.0%
Ohio 16	Betty Sutton; Redistricted from the 13th district	Democratic	2006	Incumbent lost re-election. Democratic loss.	✓ Jim Renacci (Republican) 52.0%; Betty Sutton (Democratic) 48.0%
