= Edward C. Turner =

American judge

Edward Crawford Turner
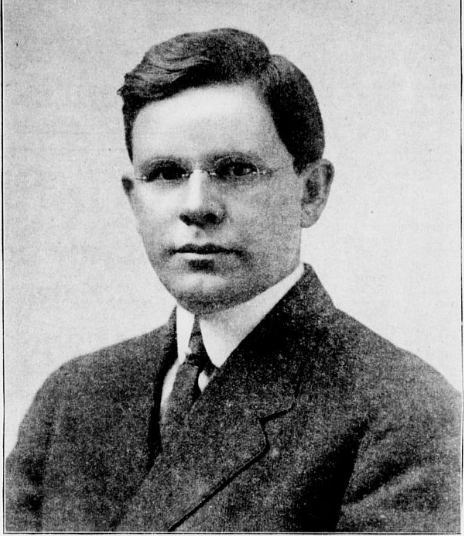

26th Ohio Attorney General
- In office 1915–1917
- Governor: Frank B. Willis
- Preceded by: Timothy S. Hogan
- Succeeded by: Joseph McGhee

30th Ohio Attorney General
- In office 1927–1929
- Governor: A. Victor Donahey
- Preceded by: Charles C. Crabbe
- Succeeded by: Gilbert Bettman

Justice of the Supreme Court of Ohio
- In office 1940–1950
- Appointed by: John W. Bricker
- Preceded by: George S. Myers
- Succeeded by: Howard E. Faught

Personal details
- Born: March 26, 1872 Columbus, Ohio, U.S.
- Died: September 13, 1950 (aged 78) Columbus, Ohio, U.S.
- Resting place: Green Lawn Cemetery; Columbus, Ohio
- Party: Republican
- Spouse: Nan A. Jahn
- Education: Moritz College of Law

Edward Crawford Turner (March 26, 1872 – September 13, 1950) was a Republican lawyer in the U.S. state of Ohio who served two non consecutive terms of two years as Ohio Attorney General, and was later a justice of the Ohio Supreme Court 1940 until his death.

== Biography ==
Edward C. Turner was born in Columbus, Ohio, in 1872 to Robert M. and Jane Crawford Turner. He graduated from Ohio State University College of Law in 1901, was admitted to the bar that year and began a practice in Columbus. He received a masters of law degree in 1903 from Ohio State.

Turner was elected Franklin County Prosecuting Attorney in 1910. Several members of the Ohio General Assembly were accused of taking bribes in 1911. Turner and Ohio Attorney General Timothy Hogan investigated. Five legislators were indicted, and four went to prison. In 1912, he was re-elected, and in that term, he prosecuted several officeholders who collected contributions from civil service employees, a violation of the law.

Turner was elected Ohio Attorney General in 1914, but lost re-election in 1916. He returned to private practice, and was elected Attorney General again in 1926. He ran in a three way Republican Party primary for Ohio Governor in 1928, but lost to eventual Governor Myers Y. Cooper.

May, 1939, Governor John W. Bricker appointed Turner to the Franklin County Court of Common Pleas to fill an unexpired term of a deceased judge, but he lost the Republican primary in 1940. Bricker appointed Turner to fill the unexpired term of George S. Myers October 1, 1940. He won election November 4, 1940, to the two remaining years of the term, and re-election in 1942 and 1948 to six year terms.

Turner served until his death September 13, 1950, after suffering a stroke. He was buried in Greenlawn Cemetery, Columbus, Ohio.

Turner was married to Nan A. Jahn December 11, 1902, and they had one son. Turner was a Freemason.

Legal offices
Preceded by Timothy S. Hogan	Ohio Attorney General; 1915 – 1917	Succeeded by Joseph McGhee
Preceded by Charles C. Crabbe	Ohio Attorney General; 1927 – 1929	Succeeded by Gilbert Bettman
