= Chester E. Bryan =

American journalist

Chester Edwin Bryan
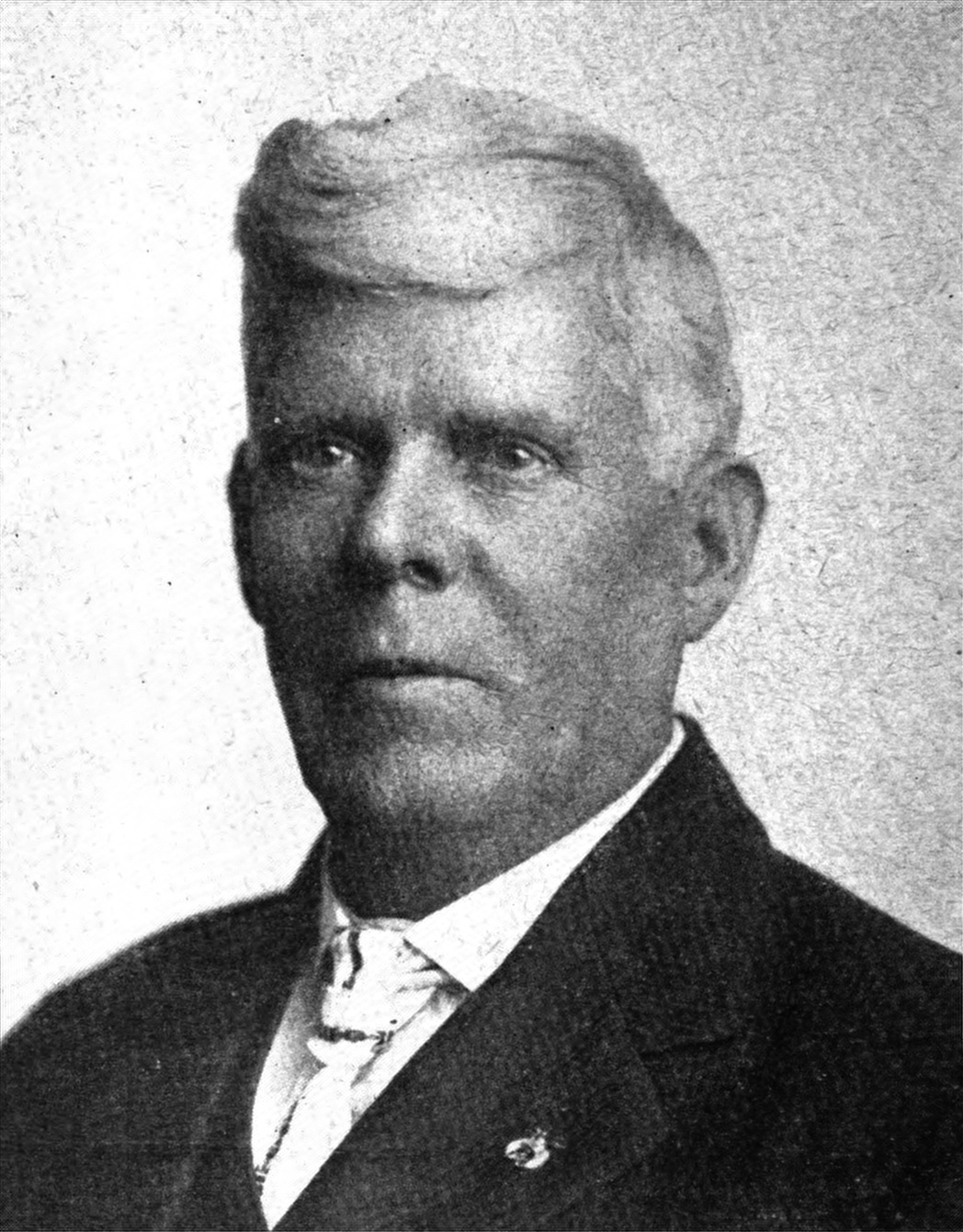

Ohio State Treasurer
- In office January 8, 1917 – January 13, 1919
- Governor: James M. Cox
- Preceded by: Rudolph W. Archer
- Succeeded by: Rudolph W. Archer

Personal details
- Born: October 29, 1859; London, Ohio, US
- Died: January 11, 1944 (aged 84); London, Ohio US
- Political party: Democratic

Chester Edwin Bryan (October 29, 1859 – January 11, 1944) was a Democratic politician and newspaper publisher in the U.S. state of Ohio who was Ohio State Treasurer from 1917 to 1919.

== Biography ==
Chester E. Bryan was born at London, Ohio, October 29, 1859, and continued to reside there. His father established the Madison County Democrat in 1857, and he succeeded as editor and publisher. He attended state and national Democratic Party conventions, and served as head of his county organization. He also served as president of three different state editorial associations in Ohio.

In 1916, Bryan was elected to a two-year term as Ohio Treasurer, serving January 1917 to January 1919.

Bryan died January 11, 1944.

Political offices
Preceded by Rudolph W. Archer	Ohio State Treasurer; 1917–1919	Succeeded by Rudolph W. Archer
