= Moses H. Kirby =

American politician

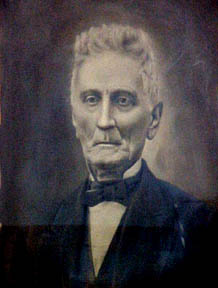

3rd Ohio Secretary of State
- In office 1831–1834
- Governor: Duncan McArthur; Robert Lucas
- Preceded by: Jeremiah McLene
- Succeeded by: Benjamin B. Hinkson

Member of the Ohio Senate from the 31st district
- In office January 5, 1880 – January 6, 1884
- Preceded by: John Seitz
- Succeeded by: J. H. Williston

Member of the Ohio House of Representatives from the Highland County district
- In office December 4, 1826 – November 30, 1828
- Preceded by: Moses Patterson
- Succeeded by: Moses Patterson
- In office December 7, 1829 – 1831
- Preceded by: Moses Patterson
- Succeeded by: David Reese

Personal details
- Born: May 21, 1798 Halifax County, Virginia
- Died: March 3, 1889 (aged 90) Upper Sandusky, Ohio
- Party: Whig, Republican
- Spouse: Emma Miner
- Children: three sons
- Education: University of North Carolina

Moses H. Kirby (May 21, 1798 – March 3, 1889) was a politician in the U.S. State of Ohio who first served in the Ohio House of Representatives in 1826, was the third Ohio Secretary of State, and was a State Senator as late as 1884, 57 years after he first served in the Statehouse.

== Biography ==
Moses H. Kirby was born in Halifax County, Virginia. He and his twin brother, Jacob, were the third and fourth of five sons of Quakers Obediah and Ruth (Hendrix) Kirby. Obediah died in 1808 in Halifax County. The oldest son died in the War of 1812, and Ruth and the four remaining sons moved to Hillsboro, Highland County, Ohio, in 1814. Ruth sent Moses and Jacob to a classical school in Ripley, Ohio, and to the University of North Carolina, where they graduated in 1819.

Moses Kirby studied law, and after admission to the bar, he was appointed Prosecuting Attorney of Highland County 1825–1830. He also was elected a member of the Ohio House of Representatives off and on from 1826 to 1831. While in the Assembly in 1831, he was elected by the assembly as the third Ohio Secretary of State on the sixth ballot over six competitors. He served until 1834.

== Relocation ==
Kirby re-located to near Upper Sandusky in what would later become Wyandot County, Ohio, after the end of his term. There, he was a lawyer, and agent to the Wyandot reservation, until their removal from the state. He was among the first residents of the town after the Indians removed in 1843. The first meeting of the Court of Common Pleas in the newly formed Wyandot County was held in Kirby's office in 1845. He also was receiver of public money at the Federal Land Office in Upper Sandusky, under appointment of President John Tyler.

Kirby was a Whig until that party dissolved, when he became a Republican. He served at an advanced age in the Ohio State Senate, 1880–1884.

Kirby married Emma Miner. Their three sons all participated in the American Civil War. Kirby may have been the oldest living Freemason in the state when he died March 3, 1889, in Upper Sandusky, or perhaps in 1893.

Political offices
Preceded by Jeremiah McLene	Secretary of State of Ohio; 1831–1835	Succeeded by Benjamin B. Hinkson
