= Joe the Plumber database search controversy =

Controversial Ohio database searches of Joe Wurzelbacher occurred during the last few weeks of the 2008 US Presidential election campaign, when Ohio Department of Job and Family Services (ODJFS) employees, and Ohio officials, became embroiled in a controversy over searches of Joe Wurzelbacher's government records after he came to national attention as "Joe the Plumber." The matter led to substantial news media attention during the presidential campaign, a new law being signed in Ohio, and a federal civil rights lawsuit which was dismissed on August 4, 2010, on grounds that the privacy violation did not amount to a constitutional violation of the right to privacy.

== Ohio Association of Chiefs of Police contractor ==
On October 14, 2009, the Columbus Dispatch reported that, "A former contractor for the Ohio Association of Chiefs of Police has been charged with rummaging through state computers to retrieve information about 'Joe the Plumber.'" The State Highway Patrol has stated that, "this individual has also used a law-enforcement computer network on Oct. 16, 2008 to access personal information about Samuel Joseph Wurzelbacher."

== Ohio Bureau of Motor Vehicles searches ==
Since The Columbus Dispatch reported on October 25, 2008, that "information on Wurzelbacher's driver's license or his sports utility vehicle was pulled [accessed] from the Ohio Bureau of Motor Vehicles database three times," multiple state databases have been used to get information on Wurzelbacher.

In Ohio, state and local officials are investigating whether the accessing was illegal. Wurzelbacher responded on Fox News saying that, "It upsets me greatly, to be honest with you." John McCain responded later that day calling the actions, "remarkable." The Obama campaign responded that the access had nothing to do with the Obama campaign and that it should be fully investigated.

== ODJFS database searches ==
During the last few weeks of the 2008 US Presidential election campaign, ODJFS employees became embroiled in a controversy over searches of Joe Wurzelbacher's government records. State and local officials conducted an investigation into whether ODJFS Director Helen Jones-Kelley's order to access Ohio government databases concerning Wurzelbacher was illegal; they concluded on November 20, 2008, that the searches breached protocol but found there was no evidence to prove they were part of a political agenda or linked with a political group or campaign. The Attorney General's office of Ohio conducted the investigation.

At the start of the investigation, Ohio State Rep. William Batchelder, R-Medina, called for Jones-Kelley to explain her agency's actions in reviewing individuals who have been the subject of news stories. In a written response to a letter from Ohio Senate President Bill Harris, Jones-Kelly defended her decision to approve of the search on Wurzelbacher after the third presidential debate:

Given our understanding that Mr. Wurzelbacher had publicly indicated that he had the means to purchase a substantial business enterprise, ODJFS, consistent with past departmental practice, checked confidential databases to make sure that if Mr. Wurzelbacher did owe child support, or unemployment compensation taxes, or was receiving public assistance, appropriate action was being taken. The result of those checks have never been publicly shared.

The Columbus Dispatch reported on November 14, 2008, that "In response to a public-records request, the state agency said yesterday that it had no records involving previous checks of the type that Director Helen Jones-Kelley authorized on 'Joe the Plumber.'" Tom Hayes and Barbara Riley, both previous directors of ODJFS, have responded to Jones-Kelley's searches and stated that they did not conduct searches due to an individual's status being raised to "celebrity."

== Ohio Inspector General's report ==
On November 20, 2008, Inspector General Charles reported that the reasons that Helen Jones-Kelley provided for the checks on Wurzelbacher "were not credible and they included contradictions, ambiguity, and inconsistencies." Charles found that Jones-Kelley "improperly authorized searches of state databases for information on Samuel Joseph — 'Joe the Plumber' — Wurzelbacher." Charles has provided the report to the prosecutor's office of Franklin County, Ohio for their review and consideration. After reviewing the report, Strickland suspended Jones-Kelley for a month without pay, but rejected requests for her to be terminated. On December 17, 2008, Jones-Kelley resigned from her position as director of ODJFS. Along with her resignation, Jones-Kelley issued a statement. "This decision comes after a time of pause, in which I realize that I continue to be used as a political postscript, providing a distraction from urgent state priorities." Fred Williams and Doug Thompson, members of Jones-Kelley's staff, who had both been suspended after being implicated in the ODJFS computer records search, left their positions due to resignation and removal. Governor Ted Strickland's spokesperson stated that the governor "values Helen Jones-Kelley's years of public service as a dedicated advocate for the most vulnerable among us." Upon Jones-Kelley's resignation, Douglas E. Lumpkin was chosen by Governor Strickland to replace her as director of ODJFS.

== House Bill 648 ==
In response to the improper records search, Republican Ohio state representative Shannon Jones sponsored House Bill 648 that mandates "the firing of any unclassified state employee who improperly accesses confidential personal information". On December 10, 2008, the bill passed the Ohio House of Representatives by a vote of 69 to 26. On December 17, 2008, the bill passed the Ohio Senate by a vote of 30 to 2. On January 6, 2009, Governor Ted Strickland signed House Bill 648, creating civil and criminal penalties for violations of rules concerning access to personal information on state databases.

== Judicial Watch lawsuit ==
On March 5, 2009, in a U.S. District Court in Columbus, Judicial Watch filed a lawsuit charging that Jones-Kelley (along with employees Fred Williams and Doug Thompson) improperly searched "confidential state databases" in an attempt to retaliate against Joe Wurzelbacher's criticism of then-presidential candidate Barack Obama. The lawsuit states that the actions of these individuals "are sufficient to chill or silence a person of ordinary firmness from future First Amendment activities." Judicial Watch filed the federal civil rights lawsuit on behalf of Wurzelbacher, alleging that "officials of the State of Ohio violated Mr. Wurzelbacher's constitutional rights by illegally accessing confidential information from its official databases." The Associated Press reports that Jones-Kelley must respond to the lawsuit within 20 days. Jones-Kelley's attorney, H. Ritchey Hollenbaugh, has declined to comment on the lawsuit and has stated that he is "studying it." On May 7, 2009, the Associated Press reported that Jones-Kelly, "denies that she authorized state searches about the man known as "Joe the Plumber" after he questioned Barack Obama on the 2008 campaign trail." In addition, she "acknowledged donating $2,500 to the Obama campaign but denied providing additional help."

On November 15, 2009, the Associated Press reported that "Ohio taxpayers are paying the bill for the legal defense of three former state employees sued by "Joe the Plumber," who claims they illegally accessed his personal information leading up to last fall's presidential election."

On August 4, 2010, the U.S District Court in Columbus dismissed the lawsuit on the grounds that the privacy violation didn't amount to a constitutional violation to the right to privacy.
