= Helen Jones-Kelley =

Director of the Ohio Department of Job and Family Services
- In office 2007–2008

Personal details
- Education: University of Dayton; Miami University

Helen Jones-Kelley is the former Director of the Ohio Department of Job and Family Services (ODJFS), Ohio's largest agency, from 2007 to 2008. During her tenure she received substantial media attention for various ODJFS-related activities, and for her role in the Joe the Plumber database search controversy.

== Background ==
A licensed attorney, Jones-Kelley received her bachelor's degree in Secondary English Education from Miami University in Oxford, Ohio and her law degree from the University of Dayton School of Law. Prior to law school, Jones-Kelley studied at the Scripps Gerontology Center at Miami University. She then worked for a bank before working for the Cincinnati Recreation Department for nine years. Jones-Kelley was appointed the co-chair of Ohio's Advisory Council on Children, Youth and Families in 2003. Before Jones-Kelley began her work with Children Services, she served as an Assistant Legal Director for Montgomery County Juvenile Court. In this position, she started the program Court Appointed Special Advocate, or "CASA."

== Career ==
=== Workshops ===
Helen Jones-Kelley has frequently presented workshops on children and the law, including for the American Bar Association, National Court Appointed Special Advocate Association, and others. Helen-Jones was selected as one of the "Ten Top Women" in Dayton, Ohio in 1996 and one of the Ten Top African-American Women in 2002, and other awards. She is now (Feb 2018) serving as the executive director of Montgomery County Alcohol Drug Addiction Mental Health Services-ADAMHS

=== Director of the Ohio Department of Job and Family Services ===
Jones-Kelley, a Democrat, was selected to run the Ohio Department of Job and Family Services, by Governor-elect Ted Strickland, at the end of 2006. ODJFS oversees programs helping pregnant women with health care issues while also helping unemployed workers and senior citizens find food and shelter. As director of ODJFS, Jones-Kelley has stated that one of her top priorities is, "to increase input from county departments and better coordinate efforts."

Jones-Kelley, as Director of the ODJFS, has commented numerous times on the jobless rate for Ohio during 2008. In March 2008, Jones-Kelley commented, "News that the unemployment rate declined slightly must be tempered by the fact that total employment decreased in both goods-producing and service-providing industries." Also, Jones-Kelley commented in May that payroll had fallen and that the economy had remained "sluggish."

==== ODJFS database search ====
While in office, Jones-Kelly became embroiled in a controversy over searches of the government records of Joe Wurzelbacher ("Joe the Plumber") in the last few weeks of the 2008 US presidential election campaign. State and local officials conducted an investigation into whether Jones-Kelley's order to access Ohio government databases was illegal; they concluded on November 20, 2008, that the searches breached protocol but found there was no evidence to prove they were part of a political agenda or linked with a political group or campaign. The Attorney General's office of Ohio conducted the investigation. Thomas Charles, the Inspector General of Ohio, also headed an investigation.

At the start of the investigation, Ohio State Rep. William Batchelder, R-Medina, called for Jones-Kelley to explain her agency's actions in reviewing individuals who have been the subject of news stories. In a written response to a letter from Ohio Senate President Bill Harris, Jones-Kelly defended her decision to approve of the search on Wurzelbacher after the third presidential debate:

Given our understanding that Mr. Wurzelbacher had publicly indicated that he had the means to purchase a substantial business enterprise, ODJFS, consistent with past departmental practice, checked confidential databases to make sure that if Mr. Wurzelbacher did owe child support, or unemployment compensation taxes, or was receiving public assistance, appropriate action was being taken. The result of those checks have never been publicly shared.

According to The Columbus Dispatch on November 14, 2008, "In response to a public-records request, the state agency said yesterday that it had no records involving previous checks of the type that Director Helen Jones-Kelley authorized on 'Joe the Plumber.'" Tom Hayes and Barbara Riley, both previous directors of ODJFS, have responded to Jones-Kelley's searches and stated that they did not conduct searches due to an individual's status being raised to "celebrity".

==== Inspector General report ====
On November 20, 2008, Inspector General Charles reported that the reasons that Helen Jones-Kelley provided for the checks on Wurzelbacher "were not credible and they included contradictions, ambiguity, and inconsistencies". Charles found that Jones-Kelley "improperly authorized searches of state databases for information on Samuel Joseph — 'Joe the Plumber' — Wurzelbacher." Charles provided the report to the prosecutor's office of Franklin County, Ohio for their review and consideration. After reviewing the report, Strickland suspended Jones-Kelley for a month without pay, but rejected requests for her to be terminated.

In response to the improper records search, Republican Ohio state representative Shannon Jones sponsored House Bill 648 which would mandate "the firing of any unclassified state employee who improperly accesses confidential personal information". On December 10, 2008, the bill passed the Ohio House of Representatives by a vote of 69 to 26. On December 17, 2008, the bill passed the Ohio Senate by a vote of 30 to 2. On January 6, 2009, Governor Ted Strickland signed House Bill 648, creating civil and criminal penalties for violations of rules concerning access to personal information on state databases.

==== Use of ODJFS e-mail ====
On November 7, 2008, Strickland placed Jones-Kelley on paid leave "for possibly using a state computer and e-mail account for political fundraising". Strickland stated that this action was taken "due to the possibility, as yet unconfirmed, that a state computer or state e-mail account was used to assist in political fund raising". According to WYTV, Strickland has released e-mails showing that Jones-Kelley "used her state-issued e-mail account to send names of potential contributors to the Obama campaign". The November 20 Inspector General report found this use of state e-mail resources "to engage in political activity" improper.

==== Resignation ====
On December 17, 2008, Jones-Kelley resigned from her position as director of ODJFS. Along with her resignation, Jones-Kelley issued a statement. "This decision comes after a time of pause, in which I realize that I continue to be used as a political postscript, providing a distraction from urgent state priorities." Two members of Jones-Kelley's staff, who had both been suspended after being implicated in the ODJFS computer records search, also left their positions due to resignation and removal. Governor Strickland's spokesperson stated that the governor "values Helen Jones-Kelley's years of public service as a dedicated advocate for the most vulnerable among us". Upon Jones-Kelley's resignation, Douglas E. Lumpkin was chosen by Governor Ted Strickland to replace her as director of ODJFS.

== Judicial Watch lawsuit ==
On March 5, 2009, in a U.S. District Court in Columbus, Judicial Watch filed a lawsuit charging that Jones-Kelley (along with employees Fred Williams and Doug Thompson) improperly searched "confidential state databases" in an attempt to retaliate against Joe Wurzelbacher's criticism of then-presidential candidate Barack Obama. The lawsuit states that the actions of these individuals "are sufficient to chill or silence a person of ordinary firmness from future First Amendment activities". Judicial Watch filed the federal civil rights lawsuit on behalf of Wurzelbacher, alleging that "officials of the State of Ohio violated Mr. Wurzelbacher's constitutional rights by illegally accessing confidential information from its official databases". The Associated Press reports that Jones-Kelley must respond to the lawsuit within 20 days. Jones-Kelley's attorney, H. Ritchey Hollenbaugh, has declined to comment on the lawsuit and has stated that he is "studying it." On May 7, 2009, the Associated Press reported that Jones-Kelly, "denies that she authorized state searches about the man known as 'Joe the Plumber' after he questioned Barack Obama on the 2008 campaign trail". In addition, she "acknowledged donating $2,500 to the Obama campaign but denied providing additional help".

On November 15, 2009, the Associated Press reported that Jones-Kelley, along with two other "former state employees", were sued by Wurzelbacher for "illegally accessed his personal information leading up to last fall's presidential election".

On August 4, 2010, the U.S District Court in Columbus dismissed the lawsuit on the grounds that the privacy violation did not amount to a constitutional violation to the right to privacy.

== Personal life ==
Helen Jones-Kelley lives in Clayton, Ohio with her husband, Tom Kelley, and four daughters. She also has a stepson. Tom Kelley is the assistant director of the Family and Children First Council.
