= WCRS-LP =

Low-power radio station in Columbus, Ohio

- Columbus, Ohio; United States
- Frequency: 92.7 MHz

Programming
- Format: community radio
- Affiliations: Pacifica Radio

Ownership
- Owner: The Neighborhood Network

History
- First air date: June 29, 2007
- Former call signs: WCRM-LP (2016–2017)

Technical information
- Licensing authority: FCC
- Facility ID: 132329
- Class: L1
- ERP: 54 watts
- HAAT: 40.6 meters (133 feet)
- Transmitter coordinates: 40°03′48″N 82°53′45″W
- Translator: (98.3 MHz) W252AY (Marble Cliff)

Links
- Public license information: LMS
- Website: www.wcrsfm.org

WCRS-LP is a North American community radio station in Columbus, Ohio, area. It broadcasts 24 hours a day, seven days a week and has an online stream available 24/7. WCRS-LP broadcasts on 92.7 and on translator station W252AY 98.3 FM in most of Franklin County, licensed to Marble Cliff. WCRS-LP is owned by The Neighborhood Network and is affiliated with the Pacifica Radio Network.

The station is a not-for-profit, volunteer, non-commercial, low power community radio station which plays death metal and French electronica.

The station was assigned the WCRS-LP call letters by the Federal Communications Commission on March 30, 2006.

Among the programs on WCRS-LP are Democracy Now!, Street Fight Radio, and English, French, Somali, and Spanish-language public affairs programs.

== History ==
- June 2007: WCRS-LP begins operations and returning community radio to Central Ohio.
- August 2008: FCC approves expansion of hours from 5 daily to 13 daily.
- October 1, 2008: WCRS-LP begins 13 hours of daily broadcast with a crew of 45 volunteers.
- January 1, 2009: WCRS-LP begins 24/7 web streaming of both its on-air broadcast and web-only content.
- January 23, 2017: station changes its call sign to the current WCRM-LP
- August 2017: station transfer 102.1 frequency to Pri-Value Foundation and resumes broadcasting at 92.7 with WCRS-LP call-sign.
- December 2017: station resumes broadcasting of 98.3

== See also ==
- Columbus Free Press
- Bob Fitrakis
- Harvey Wasserman
- List of community radio stations in the United States
