= Douglas E. Lumpkin =

Douglas E. Lumpkin, an Ohio civil servant, was appointed as the director of the Ohio Department of Job and Family Services (ODJFS), Ohio's largest agency, and a member of the Ohio Governor's Cabinet, by Governor Ted Strickland on December 19, 2008. Lumpkin began his tenure as director of the ODJFS on January 12, 2009.

== Background ==
Lumpkin has a bachelor's degree in biology from Wittenberg University in Springfield, Ohio. Douglas E. Lumpkin's father, Clarence Lumpkin, is a longtime community activist in Columbus, Ohio and has been affectionately referred to as, "the mayor of Linden."

== Public service ==
From 2003 to 2005, Lumpkin was chief operating and information officer for Ohio State Auditor Betty Montgomery. Lumpkin worked for the Ohio Attorney General, where he was director of administration, for 20 years. He has also worked for the Secretary of State of Ohio.

== Ohio Department of Job and Family Services ==
Lumpkin was director of the Franklin County Department of Job and Family Services for three years. After the Controversial Ohio database searches of Joe Wurzelbacher, and Helen Jones-Kelley's resignation as director of the ODJFS on December 17, 2008, Douglas E. Lumpkin was chosen by Governor Ted Strickland to become director of the ODJFS.

=== Director of Franklin County Department of Job and Family Services ===
While director of the Franklin County Department of Job and Family Services, Lumpkin oversaw an agency with around 700 employees and with a budget exceeding 145 million dollars. During his tenure, the Franklin County Department of Job and Family Services served 24,000 people on public assistance, 130,000 people receiving food stamps, 184,000 enrolled in Medicaid, and 12,000 depended on child-care subsidies. Commenting on the responsibilities of his position, Lumpkin stated that in Ohio, "Franklin County is, by far, the largest county for handling refugees."

=== Appointment as director of ODJFS ===
Upon appointing Lumpkin as director of ODJFS, Governor Strickland stated that, “Doug's background in public administration, government and technology, combined with his strong commitment to public service make him an ideal candidate to lead the Ohio Department of Job and Family Services. Our state is facing historic economic challenges, and I am glad that Doug will be leading the agency that will provide critical services to those most in need at this time.”

Joel Potts, the senior policy analyst for the Ohio Job and Family Services Directors' Association, commented on Lumpkin's appointments by stating that, "It is an outstanding choice for the governor. Doug has the experience and leadership necessary to help the state through one of the most difficult times we've seen in decades. He's the right man for the job."

Lumpkin announced his resignation as Director on January 5, 2011.

== See also ==
- List of Members of Governors Cabinet of Ohio
