= WCRS =

WCRS may refer to:

- WCRS (AM), a radio station (1450 AM) licensed to serve Greenwood, South Carolina, United States
- WCRS-LP, a low-power radio station (92.7 FM) licensed to serve Columbus, Ohio, United States
- WCRM-LP, a low-power radio station (102.1 FM) licensed to serve Columbus, Ohio, which held the call sign WCRS-LP from 2006 to 2017
- WCRS (Wight Collins Rutherford Scott), the marketing group that purchased the ad agency of Jerry Della Femina, and then merged with Eurocom
