= Ted Strickland =

American politician (born 1941)

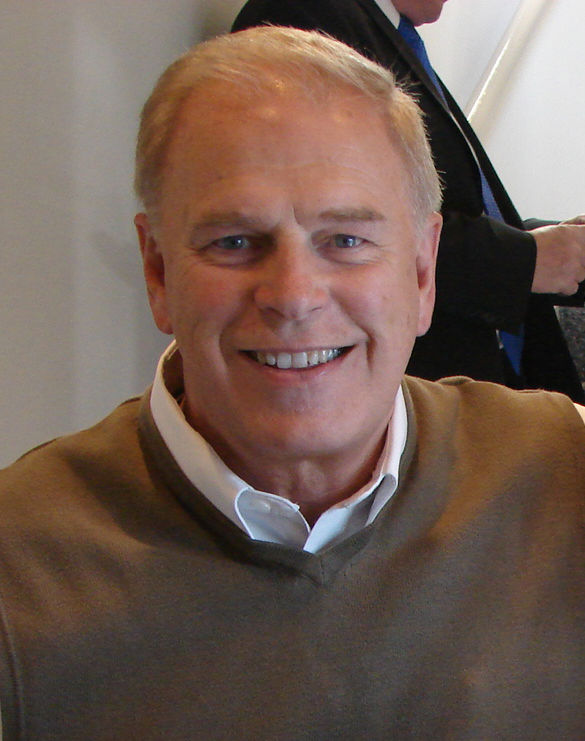
- Strickland in 2008

68th Governor of Ohio
- In office January 8, 2007 – January 10, 2011
- Lieutenant: Lee Fisher
- Preceded by: Bob Taft
- Succeeded by: John Kasich

Member of the U.S. House of Representatives from Ohio's 6th district
- In office January 3, 1997 – January 3, 2007
- Preceded by: Frank Cremeans
- Succeeded by: Charlie Wilson
- In office January 3, 1993 – January 3, 1995
- Preceded by: Bob McEwen
- Succeeded by: Frank Cremeans

Personal details
- Born: Theodore Strickland; August 4, 1941 (age 85) Lucasville, Ohio, U.S.
- Party: Democratic
- Spouse: Frances Smith (m. 1987)
- Education: Asbury University (BA); University of Kentucky (MA, PhD); Asbury Theological Seminary (MDiv)
- Strickland's voice Strickland supporting the Disaster Recovery Personal Protection Act of 2006. Recorded July 25, 2006

Theodore Strickland (born August 4, 1941) is an American politician who served as the 68th governor of Ohio from 2007 to 2011. A member of the Democratic Party, he previously represented Ohio's 6th congressional district in the United States House of Representatives from 1993 to 1995, and again from 1997 to 2007.

A native of Lucasville, Ohio, Strickland earned degrees from Asbury University, Asbury Theological Seminary, and the University of Kentucky. He worked as a psychologist and United Methodist Church minister before being elected to the House of Representatives in 1992. After narrowly losing re-election in the 1994 Republican Revolution, he regained his seat in 1996. In the 2006 Ohio gubernatorial election, Strickland defeated Ohio secretary of state Ken Blackwell in a landslide, receiving 60 percent of the vote.

Strickland's governorship was largely defined by the economic challenges of the Great Recession. He was narrowly defeated for re-election in the 2010 Ohio gubernatorial election by former U.S. representative John Kasich. After leaving office, Strickland served as president of the Center for American Progress Action Fund, a progressive public policy research and advocacy organization. He was the Democratic nominee in the 2016 United States Senate election in Ohio, but lost to incumbent Senator Rob Portman by 20 percentage points.

== Early life and education ==
Strickland was born on August 4, 1941, in Lucasville, Ohio, the son of Carrie (Carver) and Charles Orville Strickland. He was one of nine children. A 1959 graduate of Northwest High School, Strickland went on to be the first member of his family to attend college. Strickland received a Bachelor of Arts degree in history with a minor in psychology from Asbury College in 1963. In 1966, he received a Master of Arts degree in guidance counseling from the University of Kentucky and a Master of Divinity from the Asbury Theological Seminary in 1967. He then returned to the University of Kentucky to earn his Ph.D. in counseling psychology in 1980.

He is married to Frances Strickland, an educational psychologist. Strickland worked as a counseling psychologist at the Southern Ohio Correctional Facility in Lucasville. He was an administrator at a Methodist children's home and was a professor of psychology at Shawnee State University. Strickland is an ordained minister in the United Methodist Church. He was a minister at a Methodist church in Portsmouth, Ohio.

== U.S. House of Representatives (1993–2007) ==
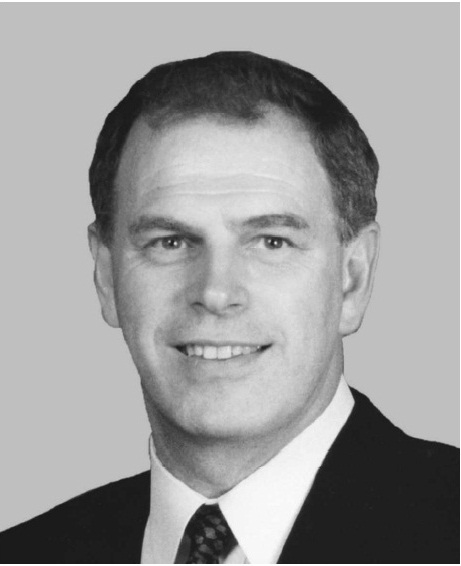
Strickland during the 105th United States Congress

Strickland ran for U.S. representative for Ohio's 6th congressional district in 1976, 1978, and 1980, losing twice to long-time incumbent William H. Harsha and later to Harsha's successor and campaign manager, Bob McEwen.

Strickland ran again for the 6th District seat in 1992, once again facing Bob McEwen, who had suffered some political damage by being associated with the House banking scandal. The 6th District had been combined with the old 10th District when Ohio lost two seats in Congress following the 1990 census and now covered a huge area stretching from Lebanon, in Warren County, to Marietta, in Washington County on the opposite side of the state. The district proved a difficult place to campaign, representing half a dozen different media markets and home to no large cities and few unifying influences.

Patrick J. Buchanan, Vice President Dan Quayle, and Oliver North came to Ohio to campaign for McEwen, but Strickland narrowly won in the general election on November 3, 1992. He received 122,720 votes to McEwen's 119,252, a plurality of 3,468 (just over 1.4 percentage points). Strickland began serving in January 1993 in the 103rd Congress.

Strickland was among the many Democrats who lost their offices in the Republican Revolution of 1994, narrowly losing to businessman Frank Cremeans. Strickland reclaimed his seat two years later in a similarly narrow victory, and took office in January 1997 with the 105th Congress. He faced a strong challenge from Lieutenant Governor Nancy Hollister in 1998, but turned it back; in the next three elections he was reelected by large margins, running unopposed in 2004. Strickland served on the Energy and Commerce Committee and the Veterans' Affairs Committee.

== Governor of Ohio (2007–2011) ==
=== Elections ===
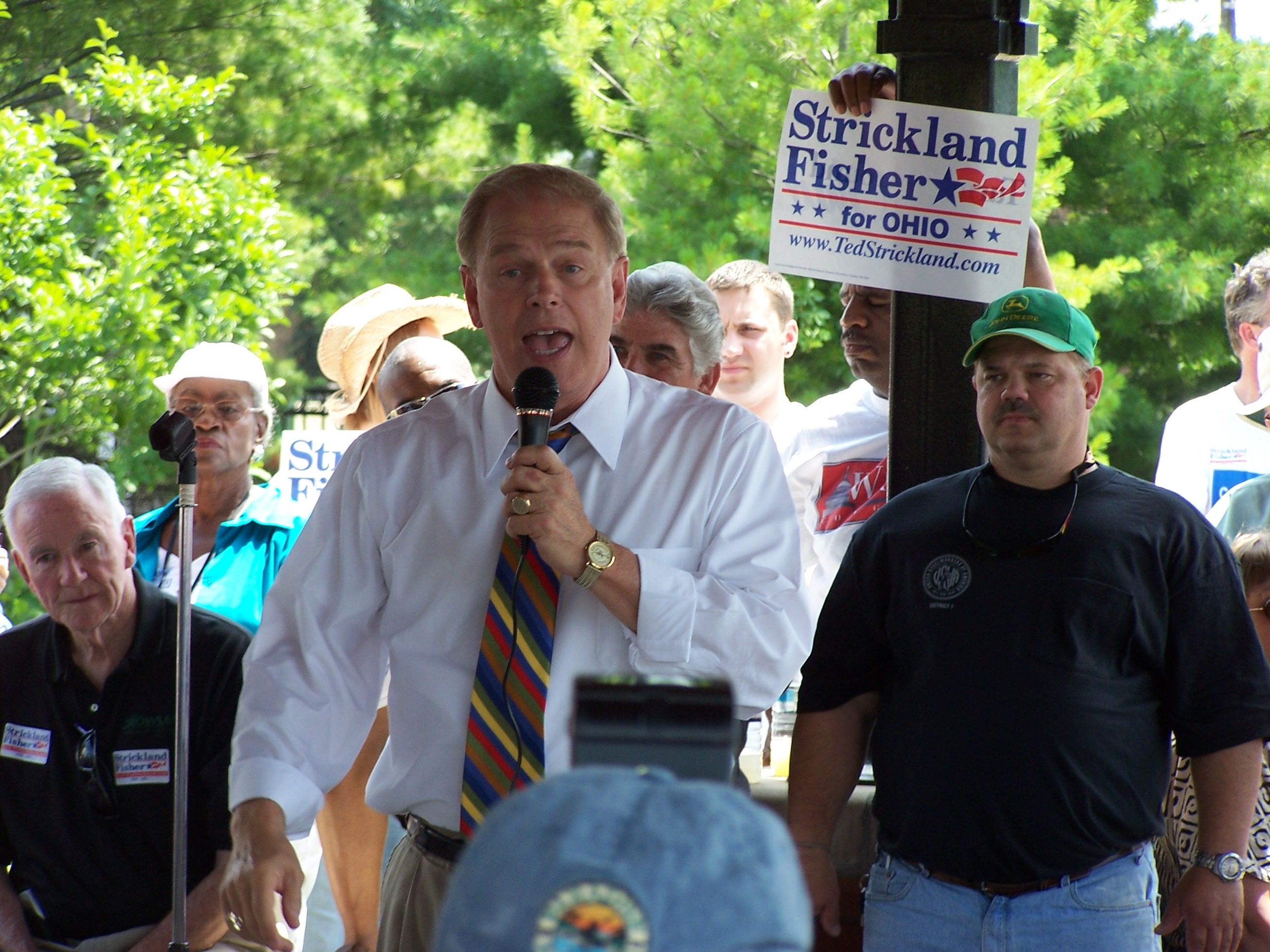
Strickland addresses a crowd in Cincinnati during his 2006 campaign

Strickland ran for governor of Ohio in 2006, when incumbent Governor Bob Taft was term-limited and could not run for re-election. Strickland won the Democratic primary on May 2, 2006, with 80 percent of the vote. He selected former Ohio attorney general and 1998 Democratic nominee for governor Lee Fisher as his running mate. Strickland's endorsements included the Fraternal Order of Police and the Ohio Federation of Teachers.

In September 2006, a group called Republicans for Strickland publicly announced their support for Strickland at a press conference. In the November general election, he was challenged by Republican secretary of state Ken Blackwell, Libertarian economist Bill Peirce and Green Party candidate Bob Fitrakis. He won the general election on November 7, 2006, by 961,174 votes.

Strickland sought re-election as governor in 2010. Because Fisher was running for the U.S. Senate, Strickland chose former juvenile court judge Yvette McGee Brown as his running mate on January 19, 2010. Strickland faced Republican John Kasich and his running mate, Ohio state auditor Mary Taylor, in the general election. Kasich narrowly defeated Strickland by 77,127 votes. Strickland was the last Democrat to be elected governor until Amy Acton was elected in 2026.

=== Tenure ===
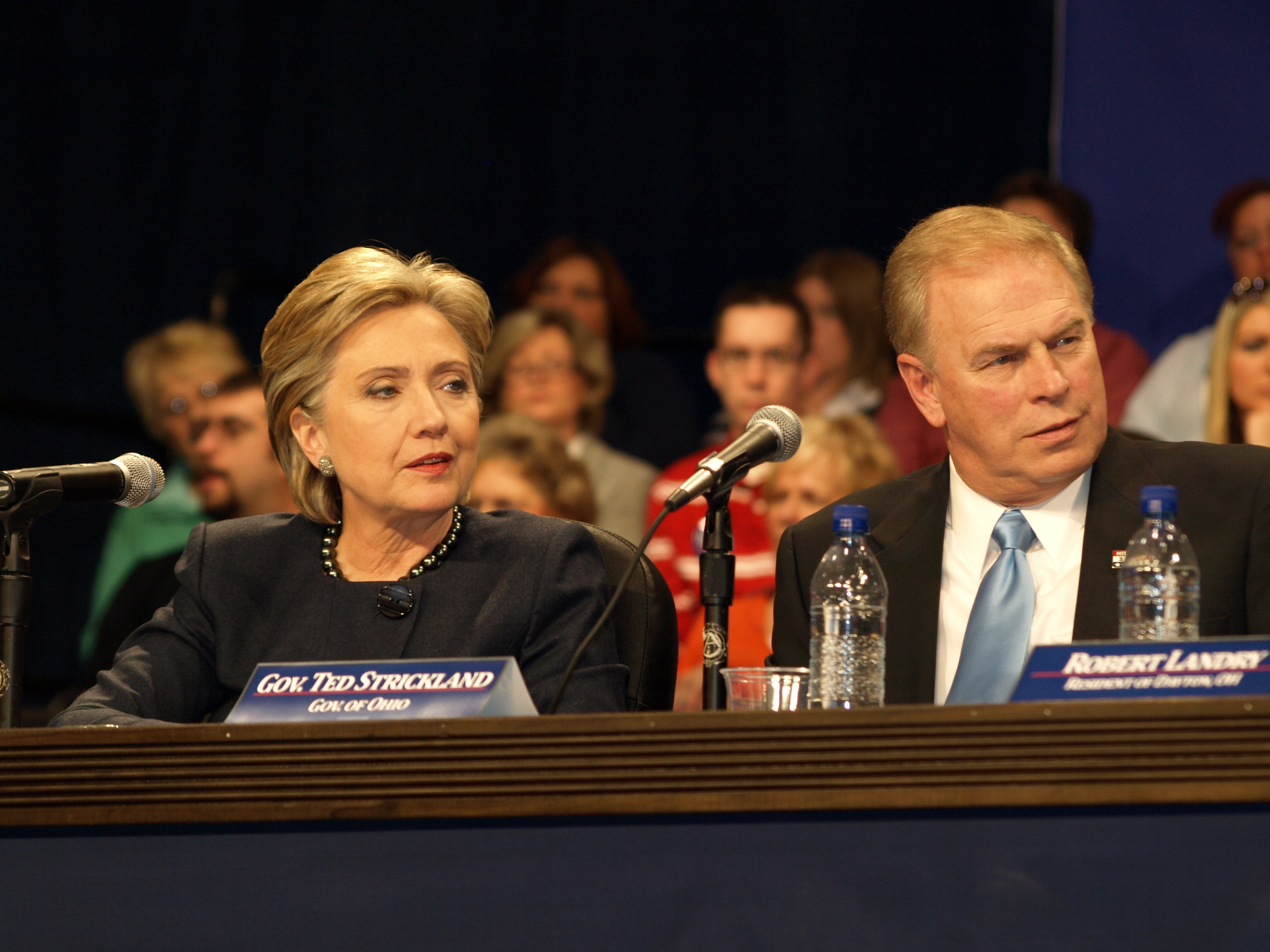
Strickland with Senator Hillary Clinton at an economic forum in Zanesville, Ohio, 2008

Strickland was sworn in as governor on January 8, 2007. In June 2007, Ohio lawmakers approved a $52 billion budget for fiscal year 2008–2009. In January 2008, facing a revenue shortfall, Strickland ordered a $733 million reduction in state spending, including job cuts and the closure of state mental hospitals. Strickland cut another $540 million from the budget in September 2008. In December 2008, Strickland announced a $640 million budget gap. In 2009, Strickland signed legislation which postponed the last of five scheduled income tax rate reductions from 2009 until 2011. The move used $844 million in anticipated tax refunds to fill the gap in the state budget.

In 2008, he signed the state's renewable portfolio standard, mandating that 25 percent of the state's electricity be produced by renewables by 2025. That same year, Strickland signed an executive order overhauling business regulations. In 2010, Strickland supported the renewal of the Third Frontier program in 2010. During Strickland's tenure, the state's rainy day fund was reduced from $1 billion to 89 cents in order to balance the state budget. Some estimates claim Ohio would have experienced a $7 billion deficit if Strickland had not made such moves and cuts to the Ohio budget.

Strickland signed an executive order in 2007 that unified the state's higher education system by creating the University System of Ohio. Strickland pushed to cut funding of school vouchers, which critics said would reduce educational choice available to the public. He opposed federally subsidized abstinence-only sex education programs.

In 2007, Strickland signed legislation exempting military veterans' retirement benefits from state taxation. He signed an executive order creating a council to oversee the eventual establishment of the Ohio Department of Veterans Services as a cabinet-level agency. In 2008, he signed an executive order creating the Ohio G.I. Promise, which charges in-state tuition to all veterans attending the state's public colleges on the G.I. bill. In 2008, he vetoed legislation which would have given small cash bonuses to veterans of wars in the Persian Gulf, Iraq and Afghanistan from the state's rainy day fund. Strickland signed an executive order requiring insurance companies to offer policyholders the option to add or keep unmarried children on their insurance policies up to age 28.

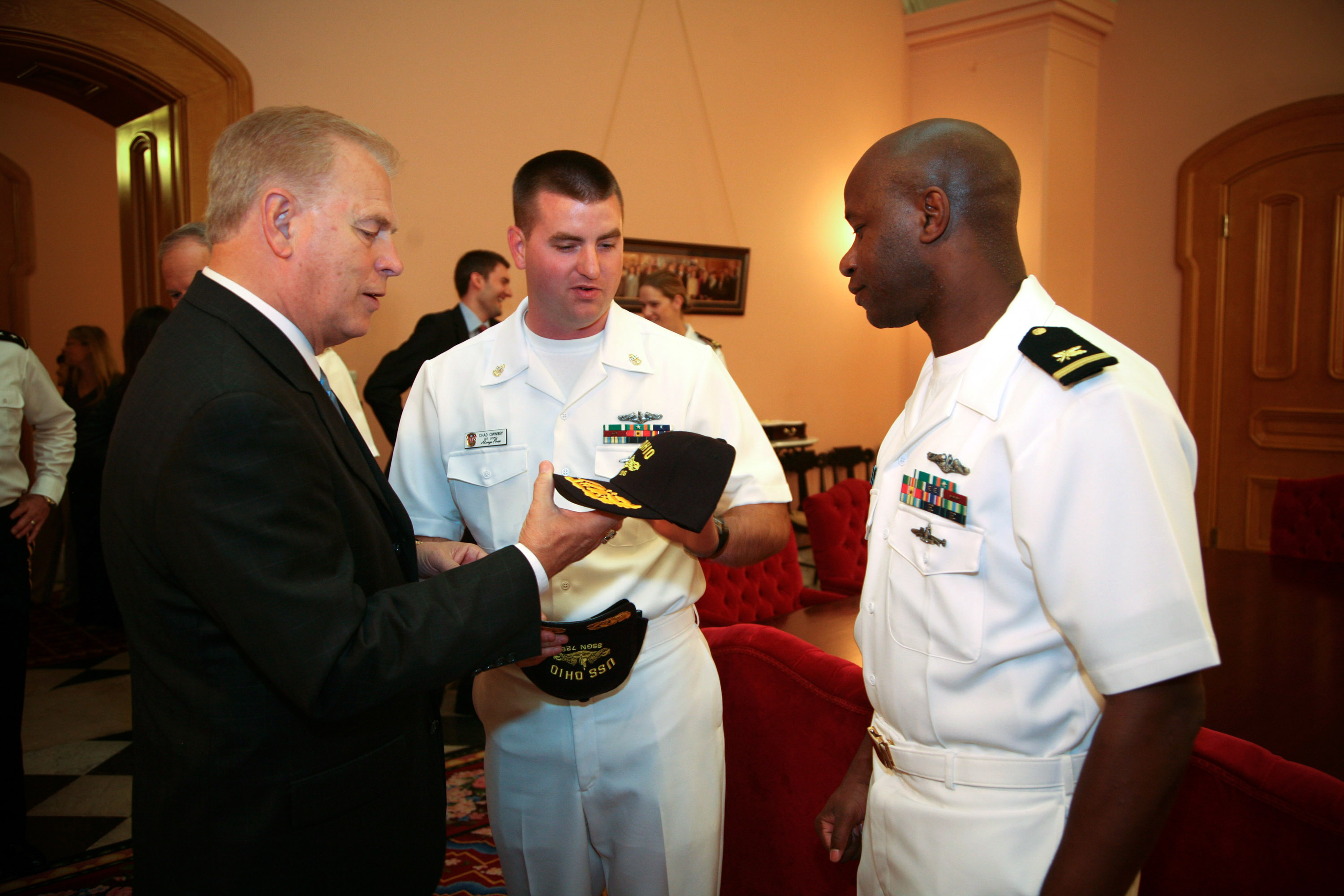
Sailors present Strickland with an honorary commander's cap during Navy Week, 2009

On the issue of capital punishment, Strickland delayed three executions until further review and commuted five death sentences. Strickland chose not to commute three additional executions, including two that eventually occurred. The March 20, 2007, execution of Kenneth Biros, which Strickland did not commute, was later stayed by the United States Court of Appeals for the Sixth Circuit in Cincinnati. Biros was eventually executed in December 2009. In 2020, Strickland endorsed legislation to abolish the death penalty in Ohio, saying "the system of justice is not perfect, and death is final", and expressed regret that he did not block executions entirely as governor.

The theft of an Ohio government computer backup tape in June 2007 was widely reported in the media after authorities revealed that the tape contained names and Social Security numbers of 64,000 state employees, 84,000 welfare recipients, and tens of thousands of others. In the wake of the theft, Strickland issued an executive order to change the practices for handling state data.

Strickland signed Ohio's castle doctrine legislation in 2008, which established a presumption that a person acts in self-defense when shooting someone who unlawfully enters his or her home or occupied vehicle. The legislation was supported by the National Rifle Association. Strickland held office when a constitutional amendment passed allowing casinos to be built in Cincinnati, Cleveland, Toledo and Columbus. Although originally opposed to the idea of allowing such types of gambling into the state, potential revenue shortfalls caused him to consider the option. More so, the implementation of video lottery terminals at Ohio racetracks also was considered as a revenue source, and Strickland said for about a year that he would ask the courts to weigh in on whether the executive branch has the authority to implement slots through the Ohio Lottery Commission.

Strickland's director of the Ohio Department of Job and Family Services (ODJFS), Helen Jones-Kelley, was involved in the controversial Ohio database searches of Joe Wurzelbacher during the final weeks of the 2008 presidential campaign. She bore ultimate responsibility for the unauthorized background checks run on Wurzelbacher, an Ohio Republican known as Joe the Plumber. Jones-Kelley was suspended without pay by Strickland and investigated by the Ohio attorney general. She resigned in December, and Strickland appointed Douglas E. Lumpkin to replace her.

As governor, Strickland worked to pass renewable energy legislation he says "helped address the issue of climate change." In 2013, he said "the debate on whether climate change exists is over. ... The debate now must be focused on how climate change is affecting our communities." In 2015, he said "I believe climate change is a problem; we've got to transition."

In 2010, Strickland opposed legislation allowing the medical use of cannabis. After leaving office he reversed his stance on the issue, however, and later in 2015 stated his support for legalizing recreational use.

=== 2008 vice presidential speculation and Democratic National Convention ===
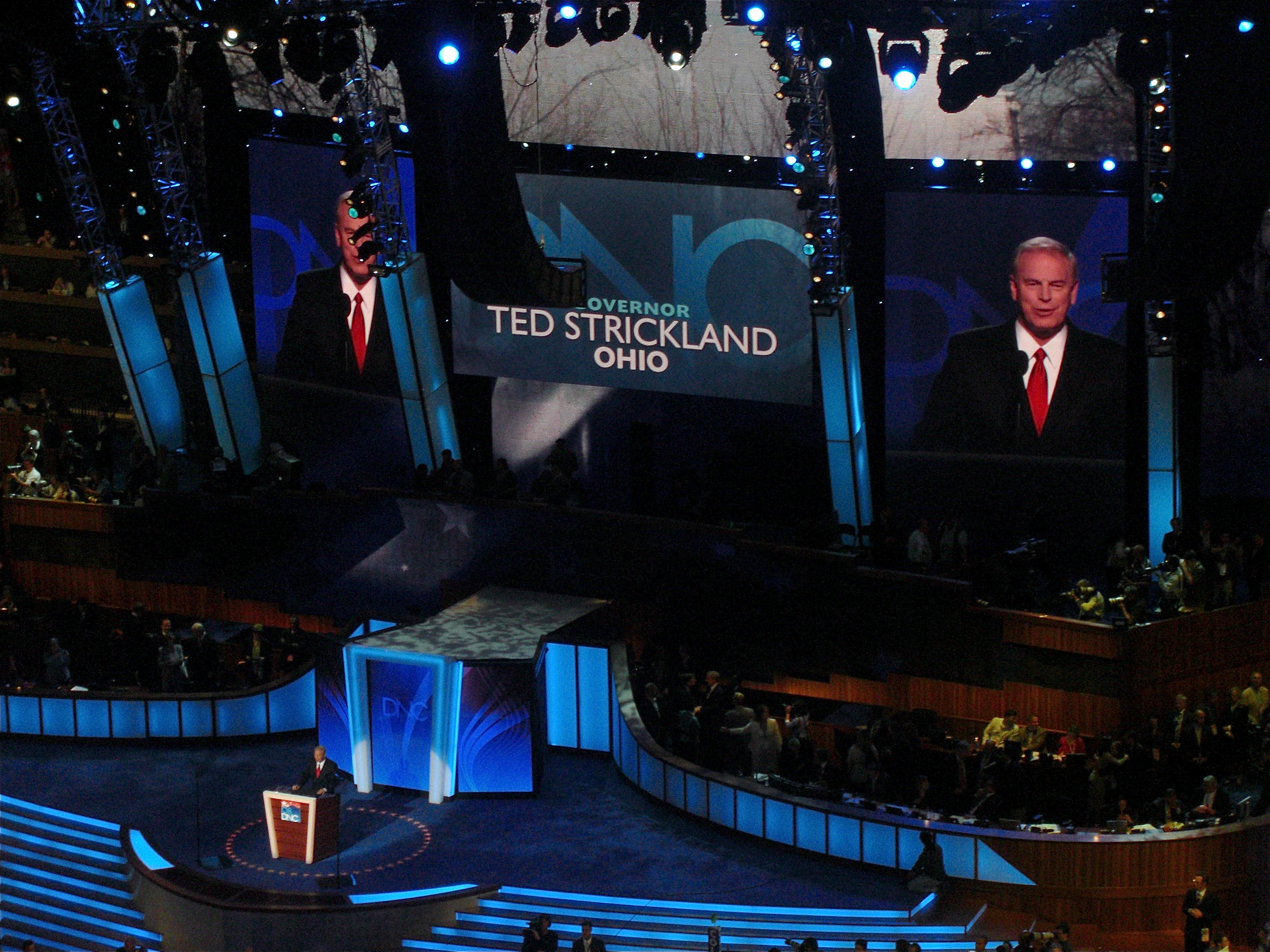
Strickland speaking at the 2008 Democratic National Convention

Strickland was mentioned as a possible Democratic vice presidential nominee in 2008. He denied that he would accept a position on the ticket if offered.

Strickland spoke on the second night of the 2008 Democratic National Convention. Journalists Peggy Noonan and David Remnick credited Strickland with delivering the best line of the convention: "You know, it was once said of the first George Bush that he was born on third base and thought he'd hit a triple. Well, with the 22 million new jobs and the budget surplus Bill Clinton left behind, George W. Bush came into office on third base and then he stole second. And John McCain cheered him every step of the way."

== Post-gubernatorial career ==
In March 2011, Kasich signed Senate Bill 5, which was intended to curtail the collective bargaining rights of Ohio public employees. Strickland was involved in gathering the petition signatures necessary to warrant a public referendum. With over two million signatures, the petition put the Ohio Collective Bargaining Limit Repeal on the November 2011 ballot, where it passed with more than 60 percent of the vote.

Strickland became a resident fellow at the Harvard Institute of Politics in spring 2012. Strickland spoke on the first night of the 2012 Democratic National Convention in a speech against the policies of Republican nominee Mitt Romney.

At the 2012 Democratic National Convention, where Antonio Villaraigosa was chairman, the original 2012 party platform caused controversy because the lack of typical invocations and references to God and God-given rights as well as lack of language affirming the role of Jerusalem as the capital of Israel. Both of these matters had been included in some previous platforms. On the second day, September 5, Strickland introduced an amendment on the floor of the convention to reinsert language invoking God and recognizing Jerusalem as Israel's capital. Convention chairman Villaraigosa put the amendment to a voice vote requiring a two-thirds majority for passage. After the first vote was indecisive, Villaraigosa called for a second vote, which was again met with an equal volume of "ayes" and "nos". A woman standing to his left said, "You've got to rule, and then you've got to let them do what they're gonna do." Villaraigosa called a third vote with the same result. Villaraigosa then declared the amendment passed, causing an eruption of boos on the floor.

President Obama nominated Strickland to be one of the alternate representatives to the United Nations in September 2013, but his confirmation was delayed through the end of the year by Republican opposition in the Senate. In April 2014, Strickland became president of the Center for American Progress Action Fund, a progressive public policy research and advocacy organization. Strickland left that position in February 2015.

Strickland served as a delegate from Ohio at the 2024 Democratic National Convention. In September 2024, Strickland was one of several former governors to sign an open letter to all 50 current governors urging them to certify their states' votes after the upcoming November election. In November 2026, Strickland was named an honorary co-chair for the inaugural committee of Governor-elect Amy Acton, alongside all other then-living former governors.

=== 2016 U.S. Senate election ===
On February 25, 2015, Strickland announced his intention to run for the United States Senate against incumbent Republican Rob Portman. Former president Bill Clinton endorsed Strickland in March 2015, and he was later endorsed by incumbent President Barack Obama, Democratic presidential nominee Hillary Clinton, Senator Sherrod Brown, and other prominent Democrats. He won the Democratic primary against Cincinnati City Council member P.G. Sittenfeld with 65 percent of the vote.

While Strickland was initially considered a strong challenger because of his Democratic base in Appalachian Ohio, the region's shift to the Republican Party and his lackluster fundraising allowed Portman to erode Strickland's early polling leads with heavy advertising. By September 2016, Strickland's campaign was reported to be increasingly faltering and with poor poll results against Portman, at least two major political action committees withdrew millions of dollars in funding for advertising, choosing instead to focus on other major Senate races in which advertising was considered more likely to make a difference.

Strickland lost the 2016 general election to Portman by 1,121,659 votes, a 20 percent margin, only winning Athens, Cuyahoga, Franklin, and Lucas counties.

== Electoral history ==
Ohio's 6th congressional district: Results 1976–1980, 1992–2004
Year	Democrat	Votes	Pct	Republican	Votes	Pct		3rd Party	Party	Votes	Pct
1976	Ted Strickland	67,067	39%	William H. Harsha	107,064	61%					
1978	Ted Strickland	46,313	35%	William H. Harsha	85,592	65%					
1980	Ted Strickland	84,235	45%	Robert D. McEwen	101,288	55%					
1992	Ted Strickland	122,720	51%	Robert D. McEwen	119,252	49%					
1994	Ted Strickland	87,861	49%	Frank A. Cremeans	91,263	51%					
1996	Ted Strickland	118,003	51%	Frank A. Cremeans	111,907	49%	*				
1998	Ted Strickland	102,852	57%	Nancy P. Hollister	77,711	43%					
2000	Ted Strickland	138,849	58%	Mike Azinger	96,966	40%		Kenneth R. MacCutcheon	Libertarian	4,759	2%
2002	Ted Strickland	113,972	59%	Mike Halleck	77,643	41%					
2004	Ted Strickland	223,842	100%	(no candidate)			*				

*Write-in and minor candidate notes: In 1996, write-ins received 16 votes. In 2004, John Stephen Luchansky received 145 votes.

Ohio gubernatorial election, 2006
Party	Candidate	Votes	%	±%
Democratic	Ted Strickland	2,435,505	60.54%	+22.23%
Republican	Ken Blackwell	1,474,331	36.65%	−21.11%
Libertarian	William S. Peirce	71,473	1.78%	
Green	Robert Fitrakis	40,967	1.02%	
Write-ins		652	0.02%	
Majority		961,174	23.89%	+4.44%
Turnout		4,022,928		
Democratic gain from Republican		Swing		

Ohio gubernatorial election, 2010
Party	Candidate	Votes	%	±%
Republican	John Kasich	1,889,186	49.04%	+12.39%
Democratic	Ted Strickland (inc.)	1,812,059	47.04%	−13.50%
Libertarian	Ken Matesz	92,116	2.39%	+0.61%
Green	Dennis Spisak	58,475	1.52%	+0.50%
Write-ins		633	0.02%	
Majority		77,127	2.00%	−21.89%
Turnout		3,852,469		
Republican gain from Democratic		Swing		

United States Senate election in Ohio, 2016
Party	Candidate	Votes	%	±%
Republican	Rob Portman (incumbent)	3,118,567	58.03%	+1.18%
Democratic	Ted Strickland	1,996,908	37.16%	−2.24%
Independent	Tom Connors	93,041	1.73%	N/A
Green	Joseph R. DeMare	88,246	1.64%	N/A
Independent	Scott Rupert	77,291	1.44%	N/A
Independent	James Stahl (write-in)	111	0.00%	N/A
Total votes		5,374,164	100.0%	N/A
Republican hold				

== See also ==
- Ohio's 6th congressional district
- List of United States representatives from Ohio

U.S. House of Representatives
Preceded by Bob McEwen	Member of the U.S. House of Representatives from Ohio's 6th congressional district 1993–1995	Succeeded by Frank Cremeans
Preceded by Frank Cremeans	Member of the U.S. House of Representatives from Ohio's 6th congressional district 1997–2007	Succeeded by Charlie Wilson
Party political offices
Preceded by Tim Hagan	Democratic nominee for Governor of Ohio; 2006, 2010	Succeeded by Ed FitzGerald
Preceded by Lee Fisher	Democratic nominee for U.S. Senator from Ohio (Class 3); 2016	Succeeded by Tim Ryan
Political offices
Preceded by Bob Taft	Governor of Ohio; 2007–2011	Succeeded by John Kasich
U.S. order of precedence (ceremonial)
Preceded by Bob Taft as Former Governor	Order of precedence of the United States	Succeeded by John Kasich as Former Governor
