= Philip Abbott (academic) =

20th-century American professor and writer

- Born: Philip Reading Abbott; October 18, 1944; Abington, Pennsylvania, U.S.
- Died: April 23, 2019 (aged 74); Detroit, Michigan, U.S.
- Occupation: Professor
- Years active: 1970-2015
- Known for: Books on US presidents
- Spouse: Patricia Abbott
- Children: Josh, Megan
- Awards: Distinguished University Professor

Academic background
- Education: American University (BA); Rutgers University (PhD)
- Doctoral advisor: Gordon Schochet

Academic work
- Discipline: Political science
- Sub-discipline: 20th-century US political science
- Institutions: Wayne State University
- Notable students: Bob Fitrakis
- Notable works: Political Thought in America (1991)

Philip R. Abbott (October 18, 1944 – April 23, 2019) was a professor emeritus of political science at Wayne State University, where he taught for 45 years, and author of numerous books and articles including Political Thought in America (1991), making him "one of the leading scholars in the discipline of political science" and "one of the nation's foremost political theorists".

== Background ==
Philip Reading Abbott was born in Abington, Pennsylvania, to William and Beryl Abbott and had a brother named William. He completed a BA (political science, 1966) at American University and a PhD (1971), directed by Gordon Schochet) from Rutgers University.

== Career ==
In 1970, Abbott joined Wayne State University as assistant professor. In 1980, he became full professor. He taught at Wayne State University for 45 years (1970–2015).

Abbott served on Wayne State University's governance of the department and college committees as well as assistant dean and graduate officer of the College of Liberal Arts. In 2001, the university named him president of its Liberal Arts Faculty Council and served as a member of the Academic Senate.

== Personal life and death ==
Abbott and his wife Patricia, née Nase (writer Patricia Abbott), had two children, Josh Abbott (prosecutor) and Megan Abbott (writer).

Philip Abbott died aged 77 on April 23, 2019, in Detroit.

== Awards ==
During his 45-year tenure, Abbott received "every major internal award for scholarship that Wayne State University confers".

Major awards

- 1977: American Fulbright Association appointment as Thomas Jefferson Chair in American Studies at the University of Amsterdam
- 1989: Gershenson Distinguished Faculty Fellowship
- 1991:
  - Distinguished Graduate Faculty Award
  - Michigan Association of Governing Boards of Higher Education Award
- 1996: Wayne State University Academy of Scholars
- 2005: Distinguished University Professor by Wayne State University

Other awards

- Wayne State Board of Governors' Faculty Recognition Awards for Furious Fancies
- Wayne State Board of Governors' Faculty Recognition Awards for Seeking Many Inventions and States of Perfect Freedom
- Wayne State University's Graduate Mentor Award
- Wayne State University President's Award for Excellence in Teaching
- Wayne State Academy Member

== Legacy ==
=== Academia ===
Early in his career, Abbott began receiving recognition among his academic peers. For example, in 1974, Wilson Carey McWilliams wrote, "Philip Abbott's concern and ability make him the kind of critic that every author longs for and seldom finds." Colleague Daniel S. Geller wrote in his remembrance that a principal reason for his joining Wayne State University was "the opportunity to work with a scholar of the stature of Philip Abbott."

=== Students ===
Abbott directed more than ten PhD students and 25 MA students. Doctoral students include Bob Fitrakis.

== Works ==
Abbot wrote more than a dozen books and more than 40 articles concerning American political science and political thought in journals including: Perspectives on Policy, Polity, Journal of Politics, Political Research Quarterly, Political Theory, and Presidential Studies Quarterly. His work received strong praise from academic reviewers. For example, Steven A. Shull wrote in 1997, "Strong Presidents is a strange but thoughtful and very well-written work incorporating the insights of literary criticism."

=== Books written ===
- Shotgun Behind the Door (1976)
- Furious Fancies (1980)
- The Family on Trial (1981)
- Seeking Many Inventions (1987)
- States of Perfect Freedom (1987)
- Political Thought in America (1991, 1999, 2005)
- Leftward Ho!: V.F. Calverton and American Radicalism (1993)
- Strong Presidents (1996)
- Exceptional America (1999)
- Challenge of the American Presidency (2004)
- Accidental Presidents (2008)
- Challenge of the American Presidency: Washington to Obama (2011)
- Bad Presidents (2013)

=== Books edited ===
- Reflections in American Political Thought with Michael P. Riccards (1973)
- Liberal Future in America with Michael B. Levy (1985)
- Critical Review of Studies On the Social and Economic Impacts of Vietnam's International Economic Integration (2006)
- Many Faces of Patriotism (2007)

=== Articles ===
- "Accidental Presidents: Death, Assassination, Resignation, and Democratic Succession", Presidential Studies Quarterly (2005)

== External sources ==
- Wayne State University
- In memoriam: Distinguished university Professor of Political Science Emeritus Philip Abbott
