= List of presidents of Shepherd University =

President of Shepherd University
- Incumbent; Cameron B. Wesson since 2026
- Appointer: Shepherd University Board of Governors
- Formation: 1871
- First holder: Joseph McMurran (1872–1882)
- Website: Office of the President

This list of presidents of Shepherd University includes all who have served as president of Shepherd University.

== Presidents ==
=== As Shepherd College (1871-2004) ===
- Joseph McMurran, 1872–1882
- D.D. Pendleton, 1882–1885
- T.J. Woofter, 1885–1887
- Asa B. Bush, 1887–1891
- E.M. Vale, 1891–1892
- A.C. Kimler, 1892–1901
- E.F. Goodwin, 1901–1903
- John G. Knutti, 1903–1918
- Thomas C. Miller, 1918–1920
- W. H. S. White, 1920–1947
- Oliver S. Ikenberry, 1947–1968
- James A. Butcher, 1968–1989
- Michael P. Riccards, 1989–1996
- David L. Dunlop, 1996–2007
- Suzanne Shipley, 2007–2016

=== As Shepherd University (2004-Present) ===
- Suzanne Shipley, 2007–2016
- Mary J.C. Hendrix, 2016–2026
- Cameron B. Wesson, 2026-Present
