= Michael P. Riccards =

Michael P. Riccards (born October 2, 1944 in Elizabeth, New Jersey) is an American political scientist, writer, administrator, and professor. Riccards has been the president of three American colleges and has written extensively on public policy, the American political process, the papacy as a leadership problem, and the history of the American presidency. His book The Ferocious Engine of Democracy was praised by Bill Clinton. He was the founding executive director of the Hall Institute of Public Policy – New Jersey. He now is president of the American Public Policy Institute on YouTube.

Riccards grew up in New Jersey and received his bachelor's, master's, and Ph.D. in political science from Rutgers University; he finished his formal studies in 1970. He was one of the youngest Ph.D.s in the university's longest history. Riccards was named a Fulbright Fellow to Japan in 1973 and a Henry Huntington Fellow in California in 1974. In 1975, he joined Princeton University as a National Endowment for the Humanities Fellow in religion. His main interests were political socialization and political behavior; he used stage theory in his research to learn how children get their political and later religious values. From that work, he authored the monograph, The Making of the American Citizenry (1973) and an article in the bilingual Belgian journal, Lumen Vitae.

In 1976, at the age of 32, he was named the dean of the merged college of Arts and Sciences at the University of Massachusetts Boston. As an administrator, he increased the numbers of minority students in the arts and sciences, and helped create a minority pre-med program. Riccards created the first Ph.D. at UMB in biological sciences; UMass Boston now has 34 doctorates. Five years later, he became provost and academic vice president at Hunter College of the City University of New York. Riccards worked to re-establish sabbaticals for faculty, which had been abolished systemwide during the 1970s. He revamped the school-deaconal structure, and created the college's first doctoral programs. He also taught political science for three years. He cohosted the WUMB campus affairs weekly radio show "Backtalk".

Riccards became president of St. John's College in Santa Fe, New Mexico in 1986. He worked to build a new library for the school, and served on the New Mexico Council for Humanities and the New Mexico Educational Assistance Program. He increased the number of Black, Hispanic, and Native American students there. In 1989, he left for the presidency of Shepherd College (now Shepherd University), a liberal arts college in the eastern panhandle of West Virginia. Riccards secured funding for a new science and technology building and planned the Senator Robert C. Byrd Center as part of a renovation of the library. Riccards also was appointed by the U.S. Senate to serve on the National Skill Standards Board. His other accomplishments during his tenure there included the creation of the Contemporary American Theater Festival, the Center for the Study of the Civil War, and the establishment of a community college which went on to become the Blue Ridge Community and Technical College in Martinsburg, WV.

In 1995, Riccards became president of Fitchburg State College (now Fitchburg State University) in Massachusetts, which had difficulties with low academic standards and low dormitory occupancy rates. He raised academic standards in the school's much-criticized teacher education program and started a leadership program for students, including classes in leadership. Riccards convinced then-Governor William Weld to support construction of a new physical education building and committed it to community use. He also backed a new science complex to help re-develop the city of Fitchburg. The college named its baseball field for Riccards in 2007.

After leaving Fitchburg State in 2002, Riccards became the first College Board Public Policy Scholar in Residence in Washington, D. C., and was the College Board's representative to both the National Governors Association and the National State Legislatures Association. He backed the creation of an Advanced Placement course to celebrate the anniversary of Brown v. Board of Education; the course was put on the Board’s website. Riccards also visited the assistant superintendent of the District of Columbia Public Schools to advocate Board programs aimed at high school predation; prior to Riccards' visit, the College Board had little patience and no success with the school bureaucracy. By 2020, 3,000 students were taking AP courses in the DC public schools. Riccards wrote a history of the College Board, and successfully lobbied Congress to increase its Advanced Placement subsidy to $25 million. Riccards' efforts with Congress and the Department of Veterans Affairs to help veterans enroll in CLEP courses were also successful.

After three years at the College Board, Riccards moved back to his native New Jersey and became the founding executive director of the Hall Institute of Public Policy - New Jersey in Trenton. At the Hall Institute, he worked on creating a website, Hallnj.org, established a television forum, a radio show, and published four volumes of essays from the website. He was named the New Jersey representative on the national Abraham Lincoln Bicentennial Commission and headed up the state commission.

He published a volume of his collected plays, and one of them on Lincoln became a musical produced by Genevieve Fraser on behalf of the Drama Circle in Massachusetts (2012). He has written four volumes of fiction on Italian American life, later compressed into The Ordinary Duties of the Day and Growing Up Jersey, generally set in his hometown of Madison, NJ. He is also the author of books on papal leadership. One of his books on the early presidency was cited in an opinion by U.S. Supreme Court Chief Justice William Rehnquist. Riccards was on the board of the Center for the Study of the Presidency and Congress for five years. In 2019, he co-authored Woodrow Wilson as Commander in Chief: The Presidency and the Great War. He currently is co-writing Party Politics in the Age of FDR: Making America a Global Power.

He is married and has three children and five grandchildren. His wife Barbara was a master English teacher in urban and rural high schools. His youngest daughter, Abigail, is a professional jazz singer in Chicago and his daughter Catherine was a corporate lawyer for Saks Fifth Avenue and is now with Barnes & Noble. His son, Patrick, is an education reform advocate and CEO of the Driving Force Institute, having formerly served as an aide to three U.S. senators and one U.S. representative. Dr. Riccards has won the Luigi Pirandello Award and is the recipient of an Honorary Doctor of Medicine from Tie-in University. He lives in Hamilton, NJ.

== Bibliography ==
=== Books ===
- Riccards, Michael P. and Cheryl A. Flagg. (forthcoming) Party Politics in the Age of FDR: Making America a Global Superpower. Lexington Books.
- Riccards, Michael P. and Cheryl A. Flagg. (2019) Woodrow Wilson as Commander in Chief: The Presidency and the Great War. McFarland Publishing. ISBN 978-1-4766-7957-0
- Riccards, Michael P. (2015) A Hero of My Own Life: Living in Post-War America. CreateSpace. ISBN 978-1-51507-370-3
- Riccards, Michael P. (2012). Destiny’s Consul: America’s Ten Greatest Presidents. Rowman & Littlefield. ISBN 978-1-4422-1624-2
- Riccards, Michael P. (2012). Faith and Leadership: The Papacy and the Roman Catholic Church. Lexington Books, ISBN 978-0-7391-7132-5.
- Riccards, Michael P. (2010). The College Board and American Higher Education. Fairleigh Dickinson University Press. ISBN 978-0-8386-4261-0.
- Riccards, Michael P., ed. (2011). Into the New Millennium: New Jersey and the Nation. iUniverse.
- Riccards, Michael P., ed (2007) Reaction and Reform in New Jersey. Walsworth Publishers.
- Riccards, Michael P., ed (2006). The State of the Garden State. Walsworth Publishers.
- Riccards, Michael P. (2004). The Myth of American Mis-education. Global Publications, New York. ISBN 1-59267-039-3.
- Riccards, Michael P. (2003). The Ferocious Engine of Democracy, Updated: From Theodore Roosevelt through George W. Bush. Cooper Square Press, New York. ISBN 0-8154-1257-6.
- Riccards, Michael P. (2002). The Papacy and the End of Christendom: The Leadership Crises in the Church from 1500 to 1850 (Binghamton, N.Y.: Global Publications, Binghamton, NY. ISBN 978-0-9724918-1-5.
- Riccards, Michael P. (2001). The Odes of DiMaggio: Sports, Myth, and Manhood in Contemporary America. Global Publications, Binghamton, NY. ISBN 978-1-4010-1406-3
- Riccards, Michael P. (1998). The Presidency and the Middle Kingdom: China, the United States and Executive Leadership. Lexington Books, Lanham, MD. ISBN 0-7391-0129-3.
- Riccards, Michael P. (1998). Vicars of Christ: Faith, Leadership, and the Papacy in Modern Times. Crossroad Publishing Company, New York. ISBN 0-8245-1694-X.
- Riccards, Michael P. (1995). The Ferocious Engine of Democracy: From Origins to William McKinley. Madison Books. ISBN 1-56833-041-3.
- Riccards, Michael P. (1987). A republic, if you can keep it: the foundation of the American presidency, 1700-1800. Greenwood Press, New York. ISBN 0-313-25462-1.
- Riccards, Michael P. (1973). The Making of the American Citizenry: An Introduction to Political Socialization. Chandler Publishing Company, San Francisco. ISBN 0-8102-0471-1.
- Byron W. Daynes, Byron W., Pederson, William D., and Riccards, Michael P. (eds.) (1998). The New Deal and public policy. St. Martin's Press, New York. ISBN 0-312-17540-X.

=== Articles, papers, and opinions ===
- Riccards, Michael P. (2017) “Private Emotions on the Public State; The Case of Envy and the American Presidency.” Public Voices, 3.
- Riccards, Michael P. (2007-09-20). "A Report on Education - 2006" (PDF). Hall Institute of Public Policy.
- Riccards, Michael P. (2006-12-04). "The Myth of American Mis-education" (PDF). Hall Institute of Public Policy.
- Riccards, Michael P. (2006) “Myth and Manhood: Ruth, DiMaggio and American Baseball,” in Baseball and the “Sultan of Swat”: Babe Ruth at 100. AMS Press. ISBN 978-0-4046-4257-0
- Flippo, Rona and Riccards, Michael P. (2000) “Initial Teacher Certification Testing in Massachusetts: A Case of the Tail Wagging the Dog.” Phi Delta Kappan, 82 (September), pp. 23–37.
- Riccards, Michael P. (1999) “Economics, Culture behind North-South Split,” September 4, 1999 and “Nation’s Bondage to Slavery Issue Led to Conflict,” September 11, 1999. The Washington Times.
- Riccards, Michael P. (1999) “Whitelaw Reid,” in American National Biography, ed. by John A. Garraty. Columbia University Press.
- Riccards, Michael P. (1997) “Lincoln and the Political Question: The Creation of the State of West Virginia. Presidential Studies Quarterly, XXVIII, pp. 549-64.
- Riccards, Michael P. (1997) “Rendezvous with Destiny: The Impact of Franklin D. Roosevelt on the Life and Presidency of Ronald Reagan,” in Ronald Reagan’s America, ed. by Eric J. Schmitz. (Greenwood Press).
- Riccards, Michael P. (1994) “Ty Cobb and the Great American Pastime. Elysian Fields, Summer.
- Riccards, Michael P. (1994). “Watchman on the Wall of Freedom: John F. Kennedy and His China Policy,” Asian Culture Quarterly, XXII, Spring, pp. 47–68.
- Riccards, Michael P. (1993) “Richard Nixon and the American Political Tradition,” Presidential Studies Quarterly, XXIII, Fall, pp. 739–46.
- Riccards, Michael P. (1989) “The Failure of Nerve: How the Liberals Killed Liberalism,” in Lyndon B. Johnson and the Uses of Power, ed. by Bernard J. Firestone and Robert Vogt. Greenwood Press. ISBN 978-0-3132-6395-8
- Riccards, Michael P. (1989) “James Otis,” in American Orators Before 1900: Critical Studies and Sources, ed. by Bernard K. Duffy and Halford Ross Ryan. Greenwood Press. ISBN 978-0-3132-5129-0
- Riccards, Michael P. (1988) “Dangerous Legacy: John F. Kennedy and the Cuban Missile Crisis,’” in The Presidency of John F. Kennedy, ed. by Paul F. Harper. (Greenwood).
- Riccards, Michael P. (1987) “Robert F. Kennedy,” in American orators of the Twentieth Century: Critical Studies and Sources, ed. by Bernard K. Duffy, Halford Ross. Greenwood Press. ISBN 978-0-3132-4843-6
- Riccards, Michael P. (1986) “Waging the Last War: Winston Churchill and the Presidential Imagination.” Presidential Studies Quarterly, XVI, Spring, pp. 213–23.
- Riccards, Michael P. (1981) “Rare Counsel: Kennedy, Johnson and the Civil Rights Bill of 1963.” Presidential Studies Quarterly, XI, Summer, pp. 395–98.
- Riccards, Michael P. (1981) “Philip Mazzei: The Jeffersonian as an Internationalist,” Italian Americana, VI, Spring/Summer, pp. 210–221.
- Riccards, Michael P. (1978) “The Structure of Religious Development, Lumen Vitae, pp. 97-123.
- Riccards, Michael. (1977) “The Presidency in Sickness and Health.” Presidential Studies Quarterly, VII, Summer, pp. 215–31. Results reported in Parade Magazine, February 13, 1977.
- Riccards, Michael P. (1977) “The Presidency and the Ratification Controversy.” Presidential Studies Quarterly, VII, Winter, pp. 37–46.
- Riccards, Michael P. (1976) “Six Fallacies of the Nixon-Kissinger Foreign Policy,” International Behavioral Scientist, VIII, September, pp. 16–25.
- Riccards, Michael P. (1973) “The Socialization of Civic Virtue,” in Reflections on American Political Thought: Readings from Past and Present, ed. by Philip Abbott and Michael P. Riccards. (Chandler) p. 279-91. ISBN 978-0-8102-0469-0
- Riccards, Michael P. (1972) “Civics Books and Civic Virtue.” Child Study Journal, II, Winter, pp. 67–74.
- Riccards, Michael P. (1971) “Children and the Politics of Trust.” Child Study Journal, I, Summer, pp. 227–32.
- Riccards, Michael P. (1968) “Patriots and Plunders: The Confiscation of Loyalist Lands in New Jersey,” New Jersey History (formerly The Proceedings of the New Jersey Historical Society), LXXXVI, Spring, pp. 14–28.

== See also ==
- Jean Piaget
- List of presidents of Shepherd University
