= Columbus Free Press =

American alternative journal

The Columbus Free Press is an American alternative journal published in Columbus, Ohio, since 1970. Founded as an underground newspaper centered on anti-war and student activist issues, after the winding down of the Vietnam War it successfully made the transition to the alternative weekly format focusing on lifestyles, alternative culture, and investigative journalism, while continuing to espouse progressive politics. Although published monthly, it has also had quarterly, bi-weekly and weekly schedules at various times in its history, with plans calling for a return to a weekly format by the end of 2014.

== Early years ==
The early Columbus Free Press was the culmination of a string of attempts to launch an antiwar underground newspaper in Columbus, which included the Free University Cosmic Cosmic, Gregory, The People Yes, Renaissance, and Purple Berries. None of these efforts had survived for more than six months. The Free Press (still alive in greatly altered form in its fiftieth year) was founded by a large cast of volunteers including Steve Abbott, Bill and Sandi Quimby, Paul Ricardo, Cheryl Betz, John Hunt, and Roger Doyle, with many others; some of the early founders were on the staff of the Ohio State University library. The first issue, dated Oct. 21, 1970, was printed in a run of 2,000 copies and sold for fifteen cents.

Initially the Columbus Free Press was an eclectic liberal-pacifist paper, less militant than Purple Berries, which had been founded in the aftermath of the Kent State Massacre and an 18-day student strike at Ohio State. After Purple Berries published its last issue in December some of its staff joined the Free Press. In the early days the paper's distribution center, drop-off point and unofficial hangout was a High Street headshop called Tradewinds; and after several members of the staff were arrested in May 1972 and the regular office seemed unsafe the paper was produced for a time in the basement of Tradewinds.

The Free Press survived the ending of the Vietnam War, which deprived many underground papers of their raison d'être, and in 1974 it raised its print run from 2,000 to 10,000 copies and became an advertiser-supported free giveaway newspaper, following a model increasingly adopted by many other alternative papers around the country at that time.

At this time the paper's politics continued to drift farther to the left. Some staffers and former staff were involved with the Prairie Fire Organizing Committee, the above-ground support group for the Weatherman Underground, and half the staff formed a Marxist caucus within the paper. As a result of an FOIA request it was discovered years later that the FBI had an informant inside the core staff at this time filing regular reports. During this period much of the Free Press content was reprinted from sources like The Guardian. The staff dwindled to eight active members and in 1977, facing declining readership and staff burnout, the Marxist caucus gave up the ghost and published what was announced as the paper's "final issue." Immediately the former non-Marxist faction on the defunct paper regrouped and relaunched the paper under their own control, bringing back some ex-staffers who had drifted away over the years. At this time the Free Press embraced the "alternative weekly" formula, "no longer on the barricades but supportive of those who still were," in the words of Steve Abbott, with more focus on local news, alternative culture and lifestyles.

In 1984, after ten years of free distribution, the Free Press started charging again and became a 50-cent monthly. In 1987 the editors, hearing that a local community activist named Duane Jager was talking about starting a paper of his own, contacted him and offered to give him the paper. Jager took over as the paper's new publisher and created a non-profit entity, the Columbus Institute for Contemporary Journalism, to own the paper. John Quigley stayed on as senior editor and Harvey Wasserman, a former member of the Liberation News Service collective who had moved to Columbus, joined the paper as a regular columnist, eventually becoming senior editor. Mary Jo Kilroy, one of the editors of the paper during these years, later served in Congress, representing Columbus in a seat formerly held by a Republican.

In 1993 Bob Fitrakis, a political science Ph.D., attorney and founding member and national committee member of the Democratic Socialists of America, became editor of the paper and executive director of the sponsoring CICJ, posts he continues to hold to the present day (2014).

== Present ==
In late 1995 the Columbus Free Press ceased publication, starting up again as a website a few months later. By 1998 the Free Press was healthy enough to resume publication as a print newspaper, initially as a quarterly.

In all its varied incarnations the paper carried forward a commitment to progressive politics and investigative journalism, on both environmental and political issues.

The Columbus Free Press investigated allegations of election fraud in Ohio during the 2004 United States elections, and the Free Press investigations eventually became the basis for editor Bob Fitrakis's book What Happened in Ohio? (2006). The Columbus Free Press continued to investigate allegations of electronic election fraud and fraud attempts in the 2006, 2008 and 2012 federal elections in Ohio.

Members of the Free Press were also participants of a citizen movement that opposed the Columbus Zoo tax levy in the 2014 local elections, this despite the Free Press itself being a recipient of tax money to support its own publication (now cut back from weekly to monthly due to lessening revenues). Citizens for Responsible Taxation distributed flyers in opposition of the levy, which was also opposed by the Koch brothers-funded Americans for Prosperity organization, criticized for misinformation regarding the levy's actual economic impacts on the Franklin County taxpayers.

== See also ==
- List of underground newspapers of the 1960s counterculture
- WCRS-LP
