= Hall Institute of Public Policy – New Jersey =

American think tank

The Hall Institute of Public Policy – New Jersey
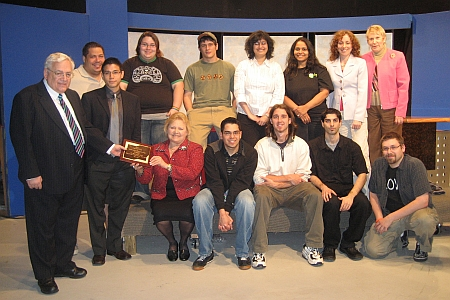
- Michael P. Riccards presenting an award to Mercer County Community College President Patricia C. Donohue
- Formation: 2005
- Type: Nonprofit
- Purpose: Public policy
- Location: Trenton, New Jersey
- Region served: Eastern United States
- Website: www.hallinstituenj.org

The Hall Institute for Public Policy – New Jersey is a nonpartisan, nonprofit think tank that focuses on public policy issues in New Jersey. The institute was founded in 2005 by George E. Hall, a finance executive and philanthropist. Hall hired Michael P. Riccards, a former college president, as executive director, and Richard A. Lee, former deputy communications director to New Jersey Governor James E. McGreevey, as director of communications. Since its inception, the institute has posted more than 400 papers on its website, conducted public forums, and published two books.

== Public policy ==
Opinion articles from the Hall Institute have appeared in several newspapers on the East Coast, including the New York Times.

In 2006 and 2008, the Hall Institute used a mediated online debate format, what it calls a "virtual debate", as a way of presenting the views of New Jersey U.S. Senate candidates without the partisan sparring and the neglect of the issues that has been characteristic of live face-to-face debates in New Jersey and elsewhere.

The institute's public forums have focused on New Jersey's role in the 2008 presidential campaign.

In partnership with Mercer County Community College, the institute produced one season of public affairs television in 2008 which aired on MCTV 26 in Mercer County, New Jersey.

In 2006, the institute published a hardbound journal, The State of the Garden State, and in 2007, another journal titled Reaction and Reform in New Jersey. Both were compilations of major papers that the institute had solicited and commissioned from scholars on topics ranging from New Jersey health care reform to lowering the levels of poverty in the state's urban areas. The institute posted a third volume online in 2008, Creating a Common Future: New Jersey and Public Policy.
