= Tom Hayes (civil servant) =

Ohio civil servant

Tom Hayes, an Ohio civil servant, has held positions within the Ohio state government such as director of the Ohio Department of Job and Family Services, director of the Ohio Lottery Commission, and as project manager for Cuyahoga County's board of elections.

== Background ==
Hayes was appointed as the director of the Ohio Department of Job and Family Services (ODJFS), Ohio's largest agency, and a member of the Ohio Governor's Cabinet, by Governor Bob Taft on September 4, 2001. Hayes served until he resigned on October 1, 2004.

== Ohio Department of Job and Family Services ==
During his time as director of ODJFS, Hayes oversaw a department that employed 3,700 employees and had an annual budget of more than $15 billion. As director, Hayes created a performance center for the department, federally certified a child support computer system, and started an online job-matching system. In 2002, Hayes argued with Hamilton County over the ownership of $8 million of welfare money. In response to the Controversial Ohio database searches of Joe Wurzelbacher, Hayes stated that the ODJFS, during his tenure as director, did not conduct searches due to an individual's status being raised to "celebrity."

== Ohio Lottery Commission ==
In 2005, Hayes became the director of the Ohio Lottery Commission. In August 2006, Hayes resigned after accepting a job with Cuyahoga County as project manager for the county's board of elections.
