= Bob Fitrakis =

American politician and writer

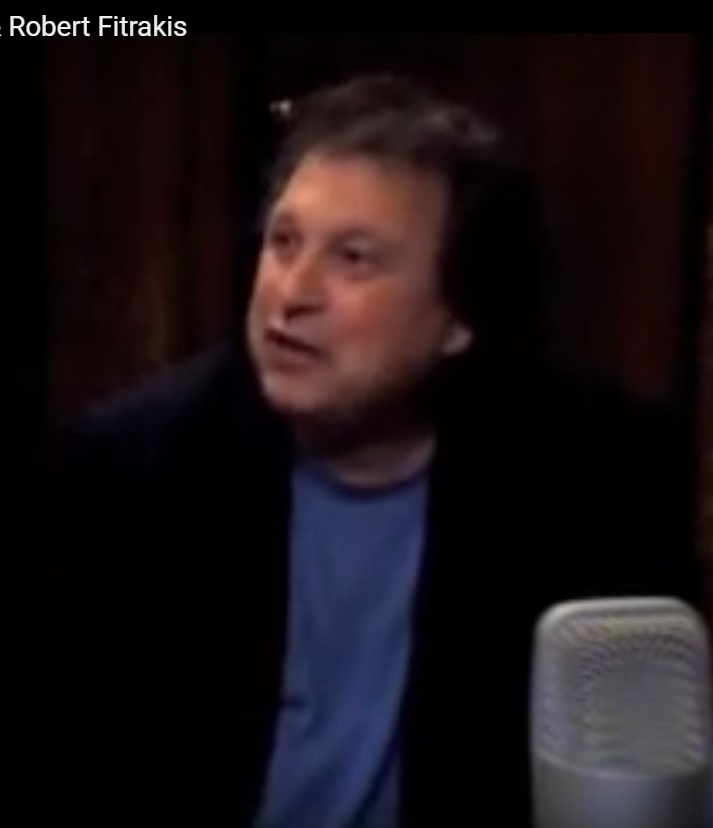
- Born: November 29, 1955 (age 70)
- Education: Wayne State University; Ohio State University
- Occupations: Professor, author, writer, lawyer
- Political party: Green

Robert Fitrakis (born November 29, 1955) is an American lawyer, political author, political candidate, and Professor of Political Science in the Social and Behavioral Sciences Department at Columbus State Community College. He has been the editor of the Columbus Free Press since 1993 and wrote extensively about the 2004 U.S. presidential election and related 2004 U.S. election voting controversies. Fitrakis is a Green Party activist.

== Background and education ==
Fitrakis is a Political Science Professor in the Social and Behavioral Sciences department at Columbus State Community College, where he won the Distinguished Teaching Award in 1991. He was a Ford Foundation Fellow to the Michigan State legislature in 1975 and studied at the University of Sarajevo on scholarship in 1978. Fitrakis earned a J.D. from the Ohio State University Moritz College of Law in 2002. His Ph.D. is in Political Science from Wayne State University in Detroit, Michigan, where his doctoral advisor was Philip Abbot. He has also taught political theory at the University of Michigan-Dearborn and political science at Wayne State University and Oakland Community College. Undergraduate: Grand Valley State Colleges, B.A. History and Political Science and Redford Union High School.

== Bibliography ==
He is the author of six Fitrakis Files books: Spooks, Nukes & Nazis, Free Byrd & Other Cries for Justice, A Schoolhouse Divided, The Brothers Voinovich & the Ohiogate Scandal, Star Wars, Weather Mods and Full Spectrum Dominance and Cops, Coverups and Corruption. Compilations of his writings at the Free Press and Columbus Alive. Fitrakis and Harvey Wasserman co-wrote Did George W. Bush Steal America's 2004 Election? Essential Documents, and What Happened in Ohio? A documentary record of theft and fraud in the 2004 election (New Press 2006) (with Steve Rosenfeld) and How the GOP Stole America's 2004 Election & Is Rigging 2008, George W. Bush vs. The Superpower of Peace in 2003 and Imprison George W. Bush: Commentary on Why the President Must Be Indicted in 2004–2005. His most recent collaboration with Harvey Wasserman is, The Strip & Flip Selection Of 2016: Five Jim Crows & Electronic Election Theft.

Fitrakis also wrote The Idea of Democratic Socialism in America and the Decline of the Socialist Party (Garland Publishers 1993). Fitrakis is a frequent speaker on political, labor and social policy issues at national academic and political conferences.

Bob Fitrakis is the executive director of the Columbus Institute for Contemporary Journalism (CICJ) and has published the Columbus Free Press since 1992 and acted as editor since 1993. He wrote monthly investigative news articles, including articles on Klan activities in Ohio. He both participated in and wrote about a controversial plan by Columbus' NAACP to "out" Klan leaders in Ohio.

Fitrakis produced an interactive educational CD ROM on hate groups in Ohio and published the journal article with Dr. Judy Gentry "High Tech Hate" for the Ohio Association of Two-Year Colleges. Fitrakis was a columnist and investigative reporter for Columbus Alive from 1996 to 2002, a local alternative weekly newspaper, and was awarded First Place for Best Coverage of Government for the article "The V Files" investigative report on Sen. George Voinovich and Second Place for "Spook Air" about Southern Air Transport's ties to the CIA and drug-running at Rickenbacker Air Base in central Ohio from the Ohio Society of Professional Journalists (OSPJ).

"Spook Air" was also awarded a Second Place in Investigative Reporting from the Press Club of Cleveland. In 1999, the OSPJ awarded him Second Place in two categories: Best Coverage of Government for his coverage of corruption in the bail bond industry "Money for Nothing" and Best Investigative Reporting for "The Shapiro Murder File" linking several of Columbus' prominent citizens to organized crime. The 1985 mob-style murder carried out against Arthur L. Shapiro, who was representing Leslie Wexner’s company “The Limited” at the time of his murder. Shapiro was set to testify before a grand jury about tax evasion and his involvement with questionable tax shelters. "The Shapiro Murder File" also won an Honorable Mention nationally from the Association of Alternative Newsweeklies. In 1998, he won an investigative reporting award from the Central Ohio Chapter of the SPJ for his article "Striking it rich in the bail bond industry." He has also written for other national and local publications.

From 1990 to 2000, Fitrakis co-hosted a regular public access news/public affairs program, "From the Democratic Left," offering analysis of political events and social issues, locally and nationally. This program chronicled the activism of the progressive community in Central Ohio, from Gulf War demonstrations to anti-Klan protests. Since June 1996, he has co-hosted, and now hosts a weekly public affairs call-in talk radio program, "Fight Back!" first on WSMZ 103.1 FM Columbus now on the internet via Talktainmentradio.com. He also had a program on WVKO 1580. He also appeared with Charles Traylor on "The Fitrakis Files" on WSMZ 103.1 FM Columbus, and now regularly hosts "The Other Side Of The News".

== Leadership roles ==
Fitrakis was an Election Protection attorney on November 2, 2004, in Franklin County, Ohio. He called the first public hearings on voter suppression and election irregularities and was one of four attorneys to file a challenge to Ohio's presidential elections results: Moss v. Bush and Moss v. Moyer.

Robert served as the co-chair to Ohio Green Party State Central Committee, and was a member of The Green Party Shadow Cabinet.

Fitrakis served as the Ohio Chancellor and was voted the National Vice Chancellor in 2005 of the International Association of Educators for World Peace, an NGO in over 100 nations working to promote human rights and world peace.

In March 1994 he served as an international observer for the national elections in El Salvador and in 1993, he visited Reynosa and Matamoros, Mexico as part of a human rights delegation to investigate conditions in the maquiladoras. As a result of the trip, he co-produced a video entitled "The Other Side of Free Trade" shown around the country at colleges and public access stations.

Fitrakis was a member of the Human Rights Party in Michigan, a founding member of the Michigan Democratic Socialists Caucus (DSC), a founding member of the Democratic Socialists of America (DSA) and the Democratic Socialists of Central Ohio (DSCO). He served on the National Political Committee of DSA in 1994–5.

In 2002, Fitrakis was awarded the Golden Ruler Award from the Columbus School Board for his journalism in behalf of the Columbus schoolchildren. In 2003, the Native American Indian Center of Central Ohio honored him with their Selma Walker Award for Lifetime Achievement in Human Rights Activism.

In 1997, the CICJ received a grant from the Drug Policy Foundation for polling in Franklin County, Ohio on the issue of medical use of marijuana and industrial hemp.

Fitrakis is a past President of the Columbus State Educational Association and has been President of the Columbus State Faculty Senate. He also chaired the Instructional Support Council of Shared Governance and was the faculty adviser to the Ohio Board of Regents.

From 1991 to 1993 he was a Friends of the Homeless board member.

== Political ==
In 2014 Fitrakis ran with Anita Rios as her Lt. Governor as write in candidates which gained official party recognition in the state, garnering 99,415 of recorded votes or 3.3%.

Ohio Gubernatorial Election, 2014
Party	Candidate	Votes	%
Republican	John Kasich (Incumbent)	1,922,436	63.86
Democratic	Ed FitzGerald	989,201	32.9
Green	Anita Rios	99,415	3.3
Total votes		3,011,052	100

In 2006, Fitrakis ran as an independent candidate for Governor of Ohio endorsed by the Green Party.

Ohio gubernatorial election, 2006
Party	Candidate	Votes	%	±%
Democratic	Ted Strickland	2,435,384	60.54%	+22.23%
Republican	Ken Blackwell	1,474,285	36.65%	−21.11%
Libertarian	Bill Peirce	71,468	1.78%	
Green	Bob Fitrakis	40,965	1.02%	
Write-ins		652	0.02%	
Majority		961,099	23.89%	+4.44%
Turnout		4,022,754	53.25%	
Democratic gain from Republican		Swing		

Fitrakis was a candidate for Congress in the 12th district in 1992, running against Congressman John Kasich and for the Columbus School Board in 1995.

He was the elected Democratic Ward committee person in the 55th ward from 1996 to 2000. He currently serves as a Near East Area Commissioner and ran for Columbus City Council in the primary of 2003 Columbus School Board that same year and endorsed by the Central Ohio Green Party. He served on the Africentric School Advisory Board for the Columbus Public Schools and worked with the West High School College Preparation Program.

Fitrakis ran for County Prosecutor, Franklin County, as a Green Party Member.

Fitrakis is a member of the Democratic Socialists of America.

== See also ==
- 2004 United States election voting controversies
- Greg Palast
- Harvey Wasserman

== Books ==
- The Idea of Democratic Socialism in America: Eugene Debs, Norman Thomas and Michael Harrington, Garland Press
- The Idea of Democratic Socialism in America and the Decline of the Socialist Party, Garland Publishers 1993
- The Fitrakis Files: Cops, Coverups and Corruption, CICJ Books, 2009
- The Fitrakis Files: Spooks, Nukes, & Nazis. Columbus Alive Publishing 2003
- The Fitrakis Files: A Schoolhouse Divided
- The Fitrakis Files: The Brothers Voinovich & the Ohiogate Scandal
- The Fitrakis Files: Star Wars, Weather Mods and Full Spectrum Dominance
- The Fitrakis Files: Free Byrd & Other Cries for Justice
- with Harvey Wasserman, Steve Rosenfeld: Did George W. Bush Steal America's 2004 Election?: Essential Documents. CICJ Books, 767 pages.
- with Harvey Wasserman Did George W. Bush Steal America's 2004 Election? Essential Documents
- with Steve Rosenfeld: What Happened in Ohio? A documentary record of theft and fraud in the 2004 election, New Press 2006
- How the GOP Stole America's 2004 Election & Is Rigging 2008
- George W. Bush vs. The Superpower of Peace, 2003
- Imprison George W. Bush: Commentary on Why the President Must Be Indicted in 2004–2005.
- with Harvey Wasserman: The Strip & Flip Selection Of 2016: Five Jim Crows & Electronic Election Theft
