= Harvey Wasserman =

American journalist and activist (1945-)

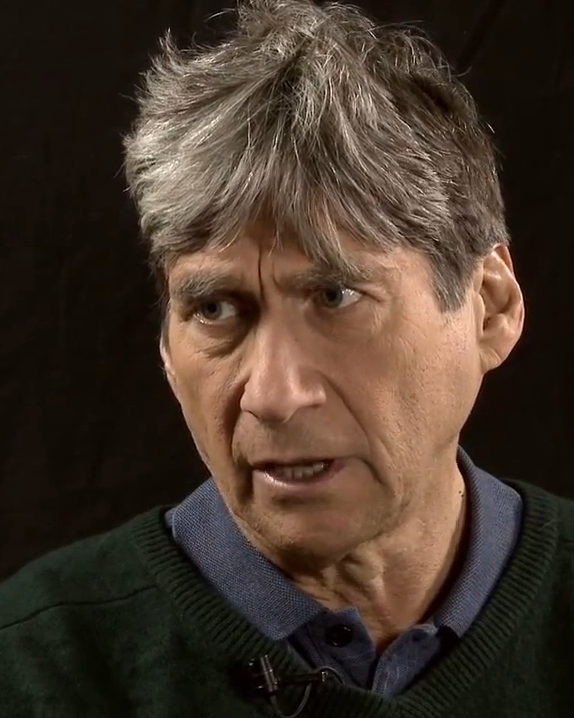
Wasserman speaking in 2013

Harvey Franklin Wasserman (born December 31, 1945) is an American journalist, author, democracy activist, and advocate for renewable energy. He has been a strategist and organizer in the anti-nuclear movement in the United States since 1973, and in the election protection movement since 2004. He has been a featured speaker on Today, Nightline, National Public Radio, CNN Lou Dobbs Tonight, Democracy Now!, Thom Hartmann, The Young Turks, Flashpoints (radio program), Egberto Willie's Politics Done Right broadcast on KPFT 90.1 fm Houston, Texas, and many other major media and internet outlets. Wasserman has been a senior advisor to Greenpeace USA since 1991, and at the Nuclear Information and Resource Service, an investigative reporter, and senior editor of The Columbus Free Press where his coverage, with Bob Fitrakis, prompted Rev. Jesse Jackson to call Wasserman and Fitrakis "the Woodward and Bernstein of the 2004 election." He lives with his family in Los Angeles where he co-hosts the California Solartopia Show on Pacifica Radio's KPFK 90.7 FM Los Angeles, California. He also co-hosts Green Grassroots Emergency Election Protection Coalition zoom gatherings most Mondays 2 to 4 pm Pacific Time.

== Education ==
Wasserman received a Bachelor of Arts in American History from the University of Michigan in 1967, where he was a member of both the Phi Beta Kappa and Phi Kappa Phi academic honor societies. He also earned a Public Teaching Certificate from New York University in 1968, and then a Master of Arts in American History from the University of Chicago in 1974.

== Anti-Nuclear Work ==
In 1973, Wasserman helped pioneer the global grassroots movement against nuclear reactors, and helped coin the phrase "No Nukes" in 1974. He was a media spokesperson for the Clamshell Alliance, and helped organize mass demonstrations at Seabrook, N.H. against reactors being built there. Rolling Stone magazine featured Wasserman in its 1979 cover story on the Musicians United for Safe Energy (MUSE), which staged five concerts in Madison Square Garden in 1979 shortly after the Three Mile Island accident, including New York City's 1979 "No Nukes" concerts and rally (featuring Bruce Springsteen, Bonnie Raitt, Jackson Browne, Crosby, Stills & Nash, James Taylor and others).

== Public appearances ==
On behalf of Greenpeace USA, Wasserman addressed 350,000 concert-goers at the Woodstock 1994 Festival. He has been a frequent speaker at both the Starwood Festival and the WinterStar Symposium (a Starwood interview is documented in the book People of the Earth by Ellen Evert Hopman). According to records from the Greater Talent Network (NY), he has addressed several score campus audiences since 1982 on issues of energy, the environment, politics and history.

Wasserman has been an adjunct instructor of history at Hampshire College in Amherst, MA, and is currently on staff in Ohio at Columbus State Community College and Capital University. Based in Ohio, Wasserman works to replace the Perry and Davis-Besse nuclear power plants with renewables and efficiency, and has helped his friends shut a trash-burning power plant, a proposed radioactive waste dump, the two Zimmer and Perry nukes, a refuge-threatening housing development and a McDonald's restaurant. He currently works through Farmers Green Power in Ohio and elsewhere to promote farmer/community-owned wind power and other renewables.

== Written works ==
Wasserman's articles have appeared in The New York Times, The Huffington Post, the LA Progressive, and other newspapers and magazines.

His first book, Harvey Wasserman's History of the United States, was first published by Harper & Row (NY) in 1972 (introduced by Howard Zinn), with approximate sales of 30,000 copies. (The book has been republished by Four Walls, Eight Windows (NY).)

In the book Killing Our Own: The Disaster of America's Experience with Atomic Radiation, Wasserman relates stories about people and animals living near nuclear weapons facilities, mining and waste storage sites, uranium processing plants, and nuclear power reactors. For example, farmers in central Pennsylvania whom he spoke to reported abnormalities in their animals in the wake of the Three Mile Island accident in 1979. Farmers living near the Rocky Flats plutonium factory in Colorado, and near the West Valley Reprocessing Plant in upstate New York, have also complained of defects and illnesses among their animals.

== Books ==
- Harvey Wasserman's History of the United States (1972) Harper & Row, ISBN 0060902698
- The Energy War: Reports From the Front (1979), Independent Publishers Group ISBN 0-88208-106-3
- Killing our Own: the Disaster of America's Experience with Atomic Radiation (PDF) (with Norman Solomon, Robert Alvarez and Elenaor Walters) (1982), Delacorte Press ISBN 0-385-28537-X
- America Born & Reborn: The Cycles of U.S. History (1983), Collier Books ISBN 0020381107
- The Last Energy War: the Battle over Utility Deregulation (2000), Open Media ISBN 1-58322-017-8
- Harvesting Wind Energy as a Cash Crop: a Guide to Local-Owned Wind Power (with Dan Juhl) (2002), Danmar.us
- George W. Bush vs. The Superpower of Peace (with Bob Fitrakis) (2003), Columbus Alive ISBN 0-9710438-4-1
- Harvey Wasserman's History of the United States (2004) Harveywasserman.com ISBN 0-9753402-0-4
- A Glimpse of the Big Light: Losing Parents, Finding Spirit (2005), Harveywasserman.com ISBN 0-9753402-2-0
- How the GOP Stole America's 2004 Election and is Rigging 2008 (with Bob Fitrakis) (2005), Harveywasserman.com ISBN 0-9753402-8-X
- Solartopia!: Our Green-Powered Earth AD 2030 (2006) Harveywasserman.com ISBN 0-9753402-4-7
- The People's Spiral of US History: From Jigonsaseh to Solartopia (2019) ISBN 9781646060504
