= Ohio Department of Job and Family Services =

Department of the Ohio state government

Department of Job and Family Services
Department overview
- Formed: July 1, 2000
- Preceding agencies: Ohio Department of Human Services; Ohio Bureau of Employment Services
- Jurisdiction: Ohio
- Department executive: Matt Damschroder, Interim director
- Website: jfs.ohio.gov

The Ohio Department of Job and Family Services (ODJFS) is the administrative department of the Ohio state government responsible for supervising the state's public assistance, workforce development, unemployment compensation, child and adult protective services, adoption, child care, and child support programs. Prior to July 2013, ODJFS was also the state agency responsible for the administration of Ohio's Medicaid program. In July 2013, a new state agency was created, the Ohio Department of Medicaid (ODM), Ohio’s first Executive-level Medicaid agency. ODJFS employs about 2,300 full time employees and has an annual budget of $3.3 billion.

== History ==
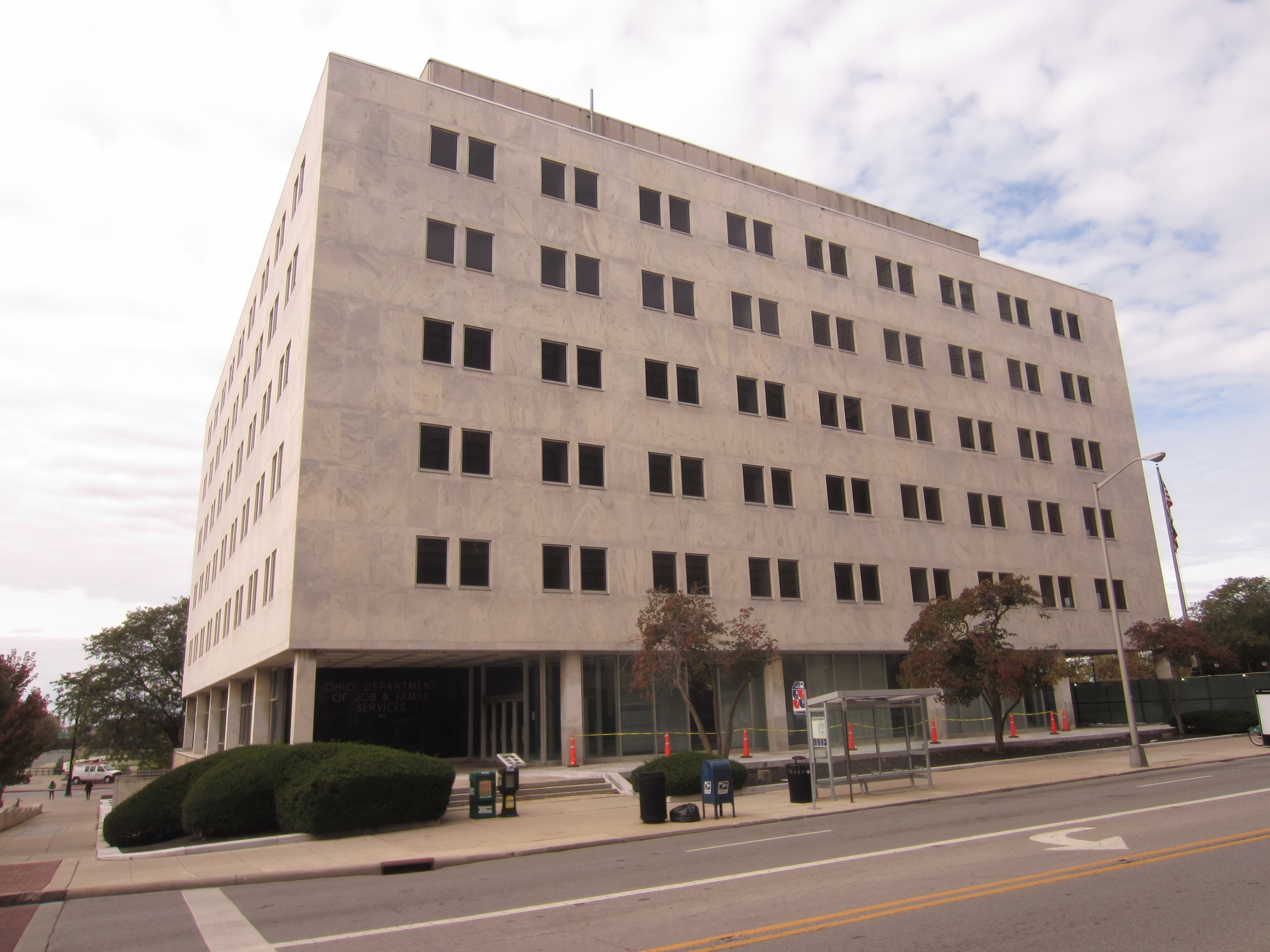
Former headquarters in Downtown Columbus, Ohio

On July 1, 2000, the Ohio Department of Human Services and the Ohio Bureau of Employment Services combined to become the ODJFS. ODJFS oversees programs helping unborn babies and their mothers with health care issues while also helping unemployed workers and senior citizens find food and shelter.

=== 2004 ODJFS and Ohio Auditor's Office joint audit ===
In December 2004, the ODJFS and the Ohio Auditor's Office launched a joint audit. As a result, Ohio officials questioned $200 million in tax dollars spent by the Hamiltion County Department of Job and Family Services.

=== Lifeway For Youth ===
In 2006, ODJFS took away the license for Lifeway For Youth, a nonprofit Christian-based placement agency, due to the death of a 3-year-old boy. Barbara Riley, then the director of ODJFS, questioned "how the private placement agency Lifeway for Youth, Butler County Children Services, and her own department failed the boy."

=== 2008 Ohio unemployment insurance trust fund ===
For the year 2008, ODJFS sought federal help concerning Ohio's unemployment insurance trust fund. State officials had stated that the fund was in danger of running out before the end of the year. On December 5, 2008, ODJFS announced that extended unemployment benefit payments will start the week of December 22, 2008. Scarlett Bouder, spokesperson for the ODJFS, stated that "an estimated 70,000 Ohioans are now eligible for the assistance and thousands more will qualify in the coming weeks as they exhaust their regular benefits."

=== 2008 ODJFS database search ===
During last few weeks of the 2008 US Presidential election campaign, ODJFS director Helen Jones-Kelley, and members of her staff, became embroiled in a controversy over searches of Joe Wurzelbacher's government records. The matter led to substantial news media attention during the presidential campaign, a new law being signed in Ohio, and a federal civil rights lawsuit.

== Services for Families ==
ODJFS provides a variety of financial and supportive services to low-income families and individuals, most of whom are employed or seeking employment. A large part of this assistance comes through the Ohio Works First and Food Assistance programs.

=== Cash and Food Assistance ===
Ohio Works First (OWF) is the financial assistance portion of the state's Temporary Assistance to Needy Families (TANF) program, which provides cash benefits to eligible low-income families for up to 36 months. Federal law requires at least 50 percent of all able-bodied adults receiving benefits to participate in work activities at least 30 hours a week. At least 90 percent of households containing two able-bodied parents are required to participate in work activities at least 35 hours a week or, if they are using federally subsidized child care, at least 55 hours a week. Allowable “work activities” include such things as on-the-job training, community service and education directly related to employment.

=== Child Care ===
ODJFS offers financial assistance to eligible parents to help pay for child care while they engage in work and training efforts. The agency, along with the county departments of job and family services, is responsible for regulating approximately 6,600 family child care homes, and for licensing and inspecting nearly 4,300 child care facilities. Every day, an estimated 250,000 children under age 6 are cared for in settings outside the home that are certified or licensed in Ohio.

=== Child Protective Services ===
ODJFS administers and oversees the state's child protective services programs. These include programs that prevent child abuse and neglect; provide services to abused and/or neglected children and their families (birth, foster and adoptive); and license foster homes and residential facilities. Child protective services in Ohio are provided by a network of 88 public children services agencies (PCSAs). Sixty-two of these are located within county departments of job and family services, and twenty-six operate independently.

=== Adult Protective Services ===
ODJFS administers the state’s Adult Protective Services program, which helps vulnerable adults age 60 and older who are in danger of harm, are unable to protect themselves, and may have no one to assist them. ODJFS has the authority to plan and develop programs, and write rules and regulations pertaining to adult protective services. It also provides technical assistance to county staff. The county departments of job and family services receive and investigate reports of abuse, neglect and exploitation of vulnerable adults and evaluate the need for protective services. During SFY 2012, the counties received a total of 14,344 reports of abuse, neglect and exploitation of adults age 60 and over.

=== Child Support ===
The ODJFS Office of Child Support collects and distributes nearly $2 billion annually to more than 1 million Ohio children. In federal fiscal year (FFY) 2011, Ohio had the third largest "IV-D"-designated child support caseload in the country. IV-D refers to the section of federal law that created the child support program. IV-D cases qualify for a variety of child support services, such as locating noncustodial parents, establishing legal paternity, establishing child support or medical support orders, and enforcing such orders. Ohio's child support program is administered locally by 88 county child support enforcement agencies (CSEAs). Sixty-seven CSEAs are located within county departments of job and family services. The rest are either stand-alone agencies or are located within the office of the county prosecutor.

== Employment Services ==
ODJFS oversees a variety of employment-related services for Ohioans. As the state's unemployment rate declined throughout the year, the agency expanded its reemployment activities for unemployment compensation recipients; enhanced OhioMeansJobs, the resume and job bank created in partnership with Monster.com; and refocused efforts to increase the number of On-the-Job Training opportunities available for Ohioans.

=== Labor Market Information ===
Through its Bureau of Labor Market Information (LMI), ODJFS collects and analyzes industry, occupational and employment information to provide statistics on economic and workforce indicators for Ohio. This includes employment levels, unemployment rates, wages and earnings, employment projections, career information, and initial and continued unemployment claim trends. This information is used by ODJFS and Ohio’s local employment program operators, as well as by the Ohio Departments of Education and Development, the Ohio Board of Regents, state and national media, private citizens and industry groups. The LMI website drew nearly 1.5 million page views in SFY 2012.

=== Workforce Services ===
As administrator of several federal workforce programs, ODJFS oversees a network of 30 full-service and 60 satellite "One-Stop Centers" that provide free job training and other services to Ohioans looking for work and employers seeking workers. The centers match job seekers with employers and help laid-off workers learn new skills and find jobs.

=== Unemployment Compensation ===
ODJFS administers Ohio's unemployment compensation (UC) program, which provides short-term income to unemployed workers who lose their jobs through no fault of their own. It reduces the hardship felt by families during periods of temporary unemployment and bolsters local economies by maintaining the purchasing power of the unemployed workers.

== Former directors ==
- Tom Hayes (civil servant)
- Barbara Riley
- Helen Jones-Kelley

== See also ==
- List of Members of Governors Cabinet of Ohio
