= Joe the Plumber =

American conservative activist (1973–2023)

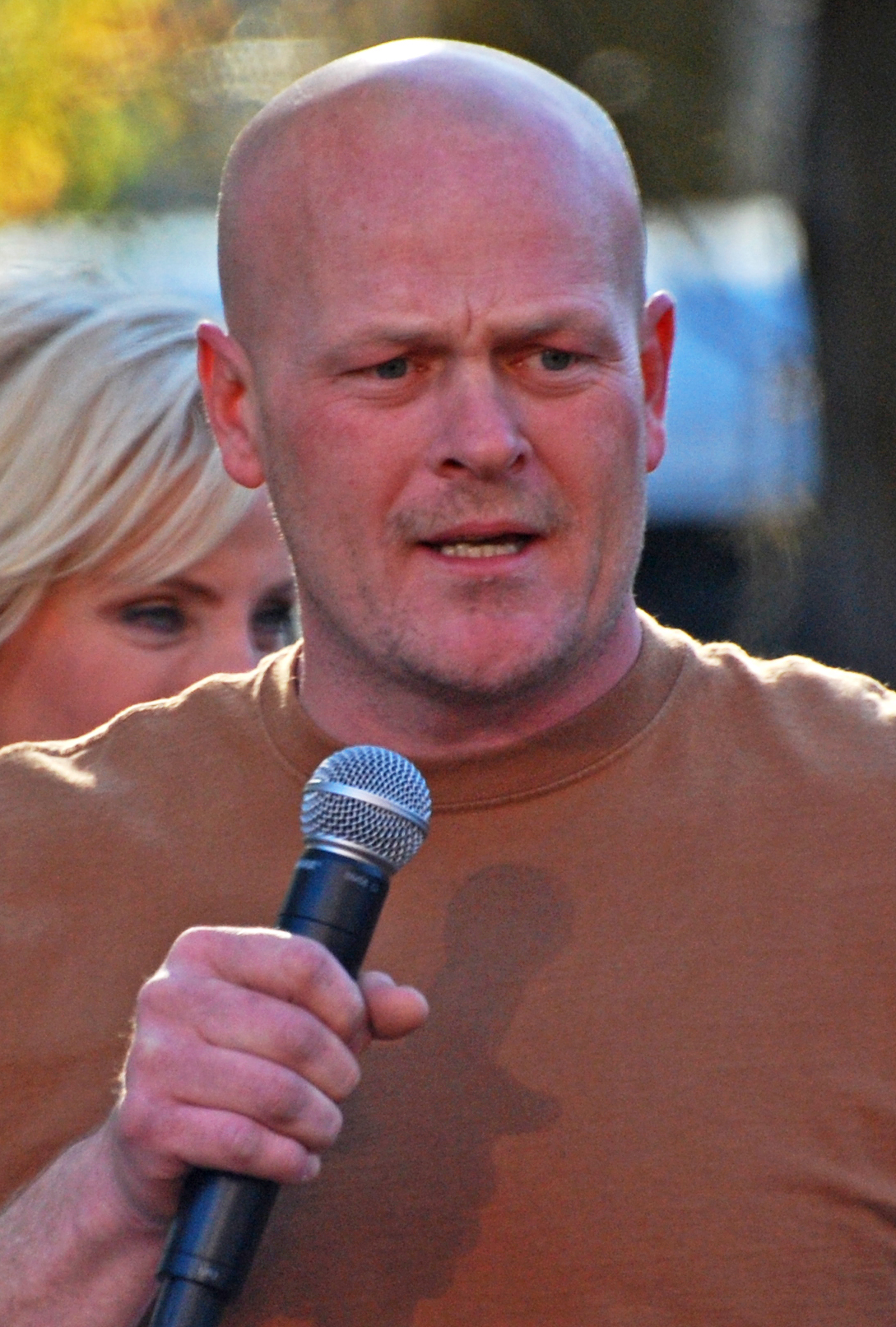
- Wurzelbacher in 2008
- Born: Samuel Joseph Wurzelbacher; December 3, 1973; Toledo, Ohio, U.S.
- Died: August 27, 2023 (aged 49); Campbellsport, Wisconsin, U.S.
- Occupations: Political activist; businessman; plumber's assistant
- Political party: Republican (before 2009, from 2011); Independent (2009–2011)
- Spouse: Katie Schanen
- Children: 4

Samuel Joseph Wurzelbacher (/ˈwɜːrzəlbɑːkər/ WUR-zəl-bah-kər; December 3, 1973 – August 27, 2023), commonly known as "Joe the Plumber", was an American conservative activist and commentator. He gained national attention during the 2008 U.S. presidential campaign season when, during a videotaped campaign stop in Ohio by Democratic nominee Barack Obama, Wurzelbacher raised concerns that Obama's tax policy would increase taxes on small business owners. Wurzelbacher was a member of the Republican Party.

After he told Senator Obama that he was interested in purchasing a small plumbing business, Wurzelbacher was given the moniker "Joe the Plumber" by the McCain–Palin campaign. The campaign brought him in to make several appearances in campaign events in Ohio and John McCain often cited "Joe the Plumber" in campaign speeches and in the final presidential debate, as a metaphor for middle-class Americans.

Wurzelbacher became a prominent conservative activist, commentator, author, and motivational speaker. In 2012, he ran on the Republican ticket to represent Ohio's 9th congressional district in the House of Representatives, losing to Democratic incumbent Marcy Kaptur.

== Early life and background ==
Wurzelbacher was born on December 3, 1973, in Toledo, Ohio, to Kay and Frank Wurzelbacher. The family moved to Florida when he was young, then returned to Toledo when he was in the middle of high school. After high school, Wurzelbacher enlisted in the United States Air Force, and chose plumbing (Air Force Specialty Code 3E451, or Utility Systems Specialist) as his area of training. He was stationed in Alaska and North Dakota. Wurzelbacher left the Air Force in 1996 and worked as a plumber's assistant, but then switched careers and started working for the telecommunications company Global Crossing.

== 2008 presidential election ==
External videos
- 'Joe the Plumber' poses tax policy question to Obama, NBC News

=== Encounter with Barack Obama ===
On October 12, 2008, during a campaign break before the final presidential debate at Hofstra University, Obama visited a working-class neighborhood in Toledo, Ohio. Wurzelbacher watched as the candidate engaged residents in conversation. He made his way through the crowd to ask Obama about his tax plan. Wurzelbacher suggested that Obama's tax plan would be at odds with "the American dream". Wurzelbacher said, "I'm getting ready to buy a company that makes 250 to 280 thousand dollars a year. Your new tax plan's going to tax me more, isn't it?".

Obama responded with an explanation of how his tax plan would affect a small business in this bracket. Obama said, "If you're a small business, which you would qualify, first of all, you would get a 50 percent tax credit so you'd get a cut in taxes for your health care costs. So you would actually get a tax cut on that part. If your revenue is above 250, then from 250 down, your taxes are going to stay the same. It is true that, say for 250 up — from 250 to 300 or so, so for that additional amount, you'd go from 36 to 39 percent, which is what it was under Bill Clinton."

Obama also said, "It's not that I want to punish your success. I just want to make sure that everybody who is behind you, that they've got a chance at success, too... My attitude is that if the economy's good for folks from the bottom up, it's gonna be good for everybody. If you've got a plumbing business, you're gonna be better off [...] if you've got a whole bunch of customers who can afford to hire you, and right now everybody's so pinched that business is bad for everybody and I think when you spread the wealth around, it's good for everybody."

=== Presidential debate ===
During the third and final Presidential debate on October 15, 2008, at Hofstra University, many references were made to "Joe the Plumber". In the debate, McCain repeatedly brought up "Joe the Plumber" and Obama and McCain then made statements aimed directly at Wurzelbacher. As a result, subsequent media attention was directed at Wurzelbacher.

After the debate, Wurzelbacher did not declare his vote for either candidate. He expressed concern that Obama's plans were "one step closer to socialism". Obama's running mate Joe Biden argued that 98% of small businesses take in less than $250,000 a year in income and thus wouldn't be subject to higher taxes under Obama's plan. McCain stated that Wurzelbacher would see higher taxes under Obama's plan.

=== 2008 media appearances ===
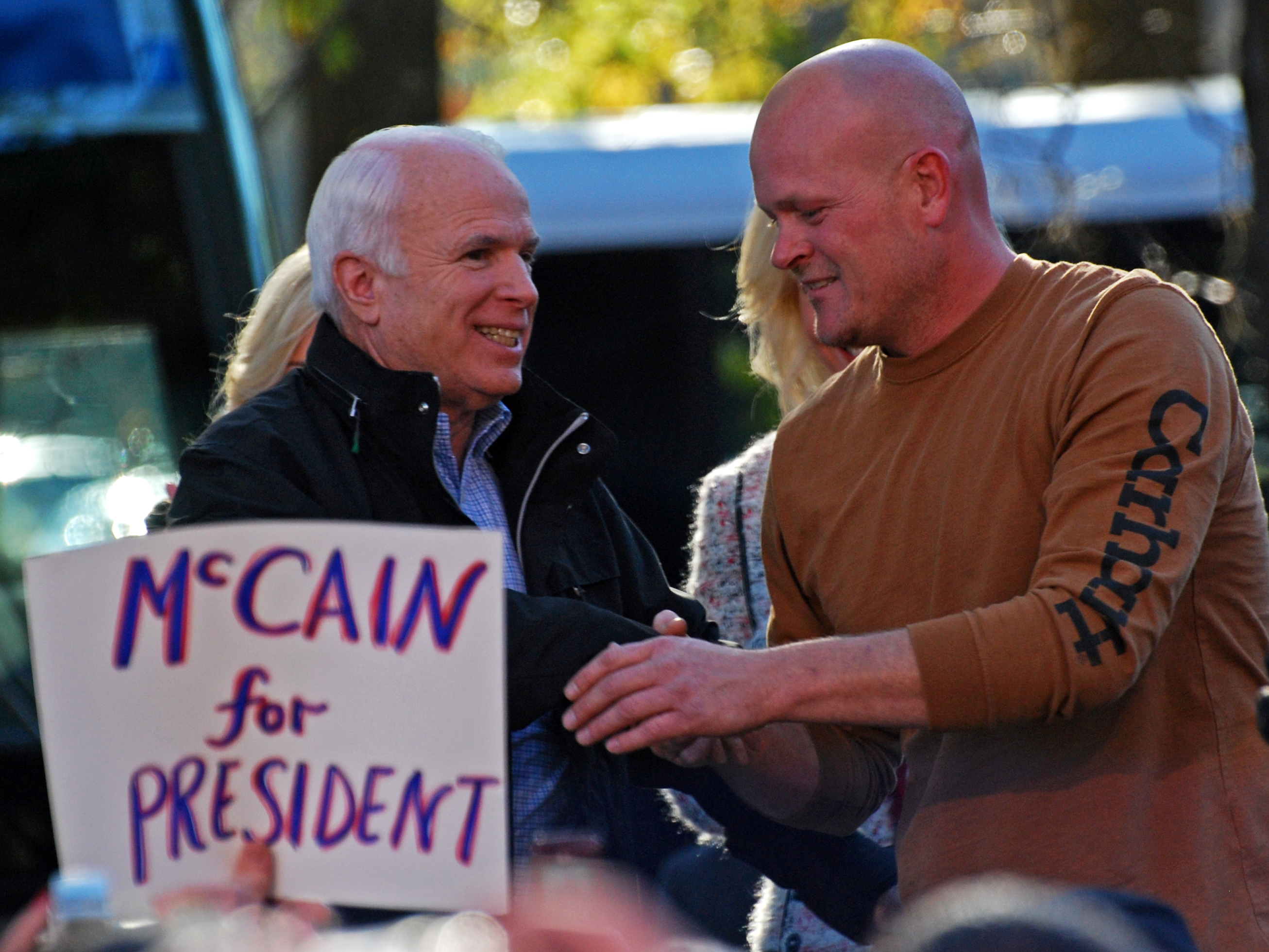
Wurzelbacher and John McCain in a joint appearance at Elyria, Ohio

Wurzelbacher spoke to Katie Couric of CBS Evening News on October 15, shortly after the conclusion of the final debate. Asked whether Obama's proposed $250,000 tax threshold would affect him, Wurzelbacher replied: "Not right now at presently, but [...] he's going to do that now for people who make $250,000 a year. When's he going to decide that $100,000 is too much? [...] You're on a slippery slope here. You vote on somebody who decides that $250,000 and you're rich? And $100,000 and you're rich? [...] Where does it end?" He also said: "I asked the question but I still got a tap dance...almost as good as Sammy Davis Jr."

Wurzelbacher held a press conference at his home on the morning of October 16, following the debates, where he refused to express support for either candidate. "I'm not telling anybody anything" about which candidate he preferred, he said, adding, "It's a private booth. I want the American people to vote for who they want to vote for."

On October 16, Wurzelbacher appeared on Your World with Neil Cavuto on Fox News. Neil Cavuto asked if Wurzelbacher was persuaded by Obama's plan. Wurzelbacher said that he was not and that he was more frightened upon hearing it. He suggested that Obama's plan was socialist in nature.

The same day, Wurzelbacher also appeared on Good Morning America. In response to Diane Sawyer's question whether he was then taking home $250,000, Wurzelbacher said with a laugh "No, not even close." Sawyer asked Wurzelbacher, "And the McCain camp, some people have said did they contact you and tell you that you were going to be a major part of this, and had they contacted you before that encounter with Senator Obama?" Wurzelbacher answered, "Oh no, no, no one's contacted me as far as if I was going to be on the debate or as far as my name being used. No. I have been contacted by them and asked to show up at a rally. But, other than that, no. I just happened to be here and Barack Obama happened to show up."

ABC News reported on October 16, 2008, that there was a judgment lien against Wurzelbacher for non-payment of $1,182 in owed Ohio state income taxes dating to January 2007, but "no action has been taken against him outside of filing the lien." Barb Losie, deputy clerk of the Lucas County Court of Common Pleas, said "there is a 99 percent chance [Wurzelbacher] doesn't know about the lien, unless he did a credit report or was ready to pay his taxes." While on Hannity & Colmes, Wurzelbacher stated that he was unaware of the tax lien prior to it being reported in the press. The taxes were paid on November 6.

On November 2, Wurzelbacher appeared again on Your World with Neil Cavuto, where he expressed concern that Barack Obama's tax plans would go down "a slippery slope" and eventually raise his taxes. Wurzelbacher also questioned Obama's patriotism, saying "there's too many questions with Barack Obama and his loyalty to our country."

=== References on the campaign trail ===
On October 18, McCain told a campaign rally in Melbourne, Florida, that he had phoned Wurzelbacher for the first time on October 17. McCain said, "He's a great guy, proud of his grandfather who served in the US Marine Corps. We're going to fight for Joe, my friends, we are going to fight for him. The question Joe asked about our economy is important, because Senator Obama's plan would raise taxes on small businesses that employ 16 million Americans. Senator Obama's plan will kill those jobs at just the time when we need to be creating more jobs. My plan will create jobs, and that's what America needs."

The McCain–Palin campaign's senior strategist, Steve Schmidt, said that McCain's strategy in the final weeks of the presidential campaign was based primarily on his differences with Obama on economic issues, which they would continue to highlight through the story of Joe the Plumber.

After the final presidential debate, McCain and his running mate Sarah Palin frequently repeated the charge in campaign speeches that "Joe the Plumber" would pay higher taxes under Obama and Biden's plan, although according to tax analysts neither Wurzelbacher nor the company he worked for would actually be subject to higher taxes under Obama's tax plan. Obama's "spread the wealth around" quote was later used by the McCain campaign, comparing the Democratic policies to socialism. McCain said, "[Obama] wants government to take Joe's money and give it to somebody else." Obama said in a campaign rally on October 24 that McCain was "not fighting for Joe the Plumber. He's fighting for Joe the Hedge Fund Manager... He likes to talk about Joe the Plumber but he's in cahoots with Joe the CEO." Obama then promoted a plan for middle-class tax cuts and "asked for a show of hands at the rally in the Richmond Coliseum from those making less than $250,000. Nearly all of the 13,000 people raised their hands."

Aides to the McCain–Palin campaign said on October 24 that they would "spend heavily" on a new TV advertisement invoking Wurzelbacher's nickname. The advertisement would feature "several different people looking into the camera and saying, 'I'm Joe the Plumber.' One man accuses Obama of wanting to use the man's 'sweat to pay for his trillion dollars in new spending.'"

=== Joint appearances with John McCain ===
On October 30, Wurzelbacher made appearances with John McCain during Ohio campaign stops in Sandusky, Elyria, and Mentor, Ohio. In Sandusky, McCain accused the Obama campaign of attacking Wurzelbacher, and in Mentor, Wurzelbacher was allowed to address the crowd, saying, "Once you find out the facts, they become quite obvious," while pointing at McCain.

Earlier in the day, at a rally in Defiance, Ohio, McCain thought that Wurzelbacher was supposed to be in the crowd and called for him to stand up. When it became clear that he wasn't in attendance, McCain ended the silence by telling the whole crowd instead to stand up, stating, "You're all Joe the Plumber."

=== Plumbing credentials ===
Regarding his statement to Barack Obama about intending to buy the plumbing firm that employed him, Wurzelbacher later said that the idea of buying the company was discussed during his job interview six years prior. Court records show that Wurzelbacher made $40,000 in 2006.

As part of the background on McCain's use of "Joe the Plumber" during the 2008 campaign, several media outlets researched his professional plumbing credentials. One Toledo Blade article stated: "Mr. Wurzelbacher said he works under Al Newell's license, but according to Ohio building regulations, he must maintain his own license to do plumbing work. He is also not registered to operate as a plumber in Ohio, which means he's not a plumber." "Mr. Joseph [business manager of the local union] said Mr. Wurzelbacher could only legally work in the townships, but not in any municipality in Lucas County or elsewhere in the country." Wurzelbacher later stated that he was no longer employed at Newell.

Wurzelbacher was not a member of the United Association of Plumbers and Pipefitters (the national plumbers' union) and never served an apprenticeship.

=== Database search controversy ===
Prior to the 2008 election, an employee of Ohio's Department of Job and Family Services (ODJFS), at the behest of its director, Helen Jones-Kelley, used state computers to search for information on Joe Wurzelbacher. On November 20, 2008, the employee reported the violation to the State Inspector General. State and local officials completed an investigation into Jones-Kelley's order, concluding that the searches were improper. On December 17, 2008, Jones-Kelley resigned.

In response to the event, Republican Ohio state representative Shannon Jones sponsored House Bill 648, which mandates civil and criminal penalties for improper access of personal information in state databases. On January 6, 2009, Governor Ted Strickland signed the legislation, which became effective after 90 days.

On March 5, 2009, on behalf of Wurzelbacher, Judicial Watch filed a lawsuit in U.S. District Court in Columbus charging that Jones-Kelley and fellow ODJFS employees Fred Williams and Doug Thompson improperly searched "confidential state databases" in an attempt to retaliate against Wurzelbacher's criticism of then-presidential candidate Barack Obama. The lawsuit claimed "officials of the State of Ohio violated Mr. Wurzelbacher's constitutional rights", and "Wurzelbacher suffered emotional distress, harassment, and embarrassment as a result of the search." Tom Fitton, the president of Judicial Watch, stated "no American should be investigated for simply asking a question of a public official." The lawsuit sought unspecified punitive damages. On August 4, 2010, the U.S. District Court in Columbus dismissed the lawsuit on the grounds that the state database search did not amount to a constitutional violation of the right to privacy. On March 25, 2012, the U.S. Court of Appeals for the Sixth Circuit affirmed the dismissal.

On October 14, 2009, the Columbus Dispatch reported that a former contractor for the Ohio Association of Chiefs of Police had been charged with "rummaging" through state computers to retrieve confidential information about Wurzelbacher. The State Highway Patrol stated that the individual also used a law-enforcement computer network to access personal information about Wurzelbacher.

== Post-2008 career and activism ==
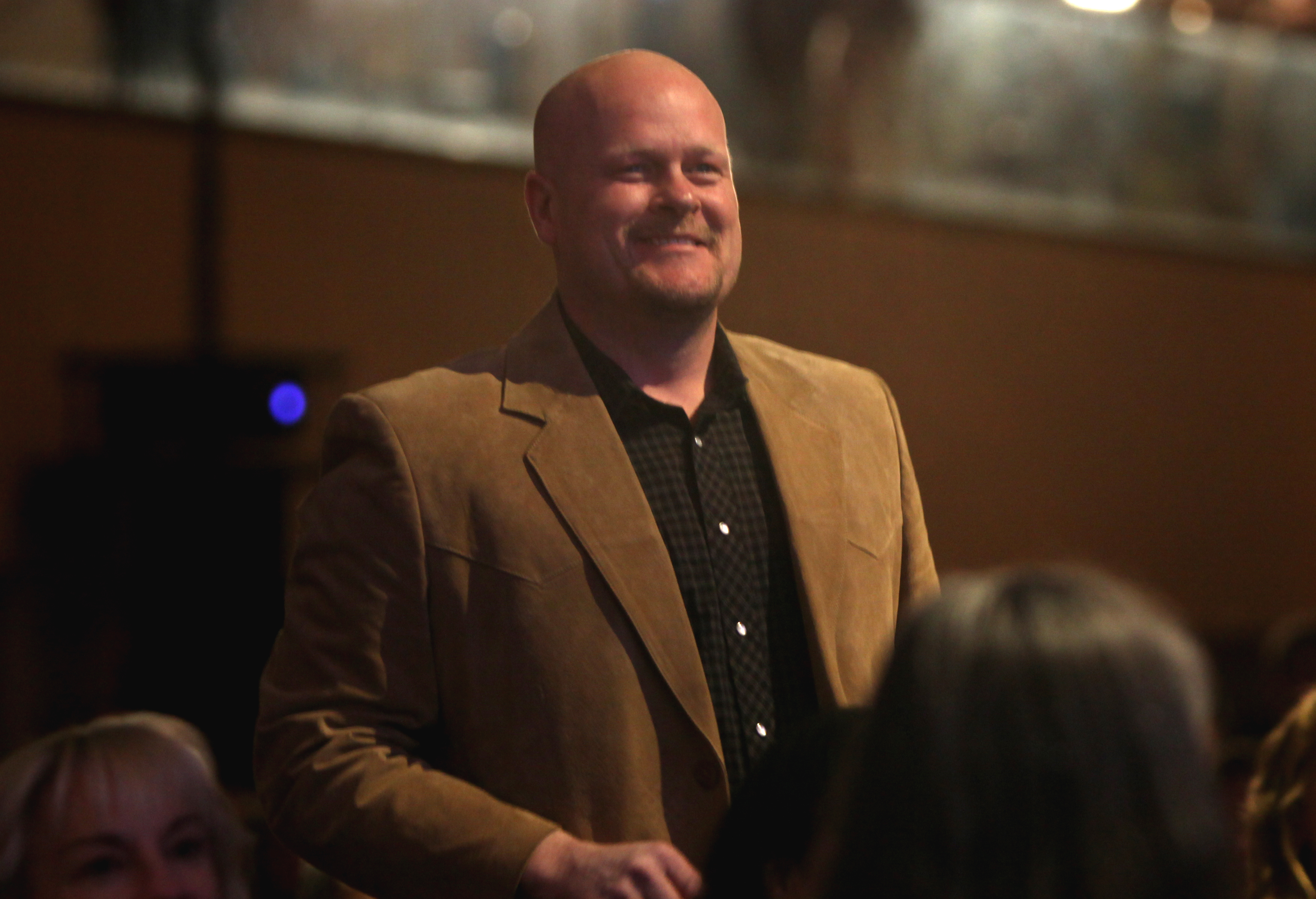
Joe Wurzelbacher at the 2012 CPAC in Washington, D.C.

In 2008, Wurzelbacher signed with a publicity management agent regarding media relationships, including "a possible record deal with a major label, personal appearances, and corporate sponsorships."

In November 2008, Wurzelbacher was hired for a series of commercials reminding people to convert analog television to digital. Wurzelbacher was hired to help consumers understand the DTV transition in the United States through a series of videos designed to explain the changeover.

In November 2008, Wurzelbacher began promoting his book Joe the Plumber: Fighting for the American Dream. Co-written with novelist Thomas Tabback and published by PearlGate Publishing of Austin, Texas, the book addresses Wurzelbacher's ideas concerning American values. In particular, Wurzelbacher criticizes John McCain and states that he did not want him as the Republican presidential nominee. Wurzelbacher criticized McCain as a candidate, saying that the election was "the lesser of two evils". On December 10, 2008, it was reported that Wurzelbacher also criticized McCain for voting for the $700 billion Emergency Economic Stabilization Act of 2008, also known as the bank bailout. On the issue of taxation, he did not consider himself to be a supporter of either party.

In January 2009, Wurzelbacher became a war correspondent for PJ Media. His first assignment involved visiting Israel for ten days during the Gaza War, with his reporting focusing on the Israeli experience of the conflict.

In May 2009, Time magazine reported that Wurzelbacher was quitting the Republican Party.

On June 25, 2009, Wurzelbacher spoke at an event called "Pints and Politics" in Wausau, Wisconsin. During his speech, Wurzelbacher questioned why Chris Dodd had not been "strung up" yet. He stated that the Founding Fathers "knew socialism doesn't work. They knew communism doesn't work."

On February 13, 2010, Wurzelbacher attended a political event for Pennsylvania gubernatorial candidate Sam Rohrer. Speaking to a reporter afterwards, Wurzelbacher said "McCain was trying to use [him]", and accused McCain of having "really screwed [his] life up".

In Wisconsin, in February 2011, he spoke at a counter-demonstration during protests against Governor Scott Walker's attempts to abolish collective bargaining rights of some public employees. In 2012, Wurzelbacher started the news site "Joe For America".

In February 2014, Wurzelbacher took a job at a Jeep plant which required him to be a member of the United Auto Workers. He complained that his colleagues called him a "tea-bagger". The Washington Post, citing Sean McAlinden, who has studied the auto bailout as the Chief Economist for the non-profit Center for Automotive Research, commented that an "irony" is "that Joe the Plumber may not have gotten this auto job if it weren't for the hated bailout of the auto industry" which was "first championed by [George W.] Bush" but attacked by conservatives when implemented by Obama. McAliden is quoted saying "He wouldn't have gotten a job in Toledo if Chrysler hadn't been bailed out. Chrysler would have shut down immediately. No production; no jobs; no pension payments; no nothing." For his part, Joe indicated he had no problem with unions per se, stating "Private unions, such as the UAW, is a choice between employees and employers. If that is what they want, then who am I to say you can't have it?"

In an open letter to the parents of victims who died in the 2014 Isla Vista killings, Wurzelbacher wrote of his right to "protect my family": "As harsh as this sounds—your dead kids don't trump my Constitutional rights ... We still have the Right to Bear Arms ... Any feelings you have toward my rights being taken away from me, lose those."

Wurzelbacher voted for Donald Trump in the 2016 presidential election.

== 2012 congressional election ==
=== Draft movement ===
After his meeting with Barack Obama, a campaign to draft Wurzelbacher to run for the United States House of Representatives in the 2010 election started with the website joewurzelbacher2010.com. The Washington Times and the Boston Herald reported that the campaign's goal was to draft Wurzelbacher to run against Rep. Marcy Kaptur of Ohio's 9th congressional district, although the possibility also existed for Kaptur to choose to run for the Senate seat being vacated by George Voinovich. The website was created by Trevor Lair (then-chairman of the Massachusetts College Republicans), Derek Khanna, and the Massachusetts Alliance of College Republicans. It encouraged visitors to sign an online petition that supported Wurzelbacher's run for office. Laura Ingraham asked Wurzelbacher, on October 24, 2008, if he would run against Kaptur. Wurzelbacher responded that he had considered the run and would be "up for it".

=== Campaign ===
On October 7, 2011, Wurzelbacher filed paperwork with the Federal Election Commission to challenge Democratic representative Marcy Kaptur in the 2012 race for Ohio's 9th congressional seat.

In the March 6, 2012, primary, Wurzelbacher gained the nomination as the Republican candidate in the race, defeating challenger Steven Kraus. He ran in the November 2012 general election against Kaptur, who had won the Democratic primary against Dennis Kucinich after the two incumbents' respective Congressional districts were collapsed into one as a result of post-2010 Census redistricting by the state's Republican-controlled legislature. He lost the election, with Kaptur, who had been the heavy favorite, receiving over 70% of the vote.

In August 2012, Wurzelbacher drew criticism for a comment he made about illegal immigration. During a campaign rally for Arizona State Senator Lori Klein, Wurzelbacher said, "For years I've said, you know, put a damn fence on the border, going to Mexico and start shooting." When asked about the comment later, he said that he did not care about being "politically incorrect". Klein defended Wurzelbacher, telling reporters his comments were just a joke.

=== Views on gun rights ===
In June 2012, Wurzelbacher's election campaign released a video in which he said the implementation of gun control resulted in Europe's Jews being unable to defend themselves during the Holocaust, explaining, "In 1939, Germany established gun control. From 1939 to 1945, six million Jews and seven million others unable to defend themselves were exterminated." In the same video, Wurzelbacher stated that the implementation of gun control by the Ottoman Empire in 1911 resulted in Armenians being unable to defend themselves against the Armenian genocide.

The video drew sharp criticism from the National Jewish Democratic Council (NJDC) and Ohio Democratic Party chairman Chris Redfern.

Wurzelbacher subsequently defended the video, stating "Different countries around the world have tried to disarm their citizens, and then have tried to exterminate their own now-unarmed citizens. If people are looking to be offended by this video, they are probably serving a political agenda. Unfortunately there are a lot of whiners out there." Wurzelbacher's spokesman, Phil Christofanelli, also defended the video, stating that Wurzelbacher was a "student of history" who knows that the Founding Fathers "understood that the Second Amendment was always the people's last defense against tyrannical government."

== Personal life and death ==
Wurzelbacher was married twice. He had one child from his first marriage and three from his second, to Katie Schanen.

In 2022, Wurzelbacher was diagnosed with pancreatic cancer. He died at home in Campbellsport, Wisconsin, on August 27, 2023, at the age of 49.

== See also ==
- Ken Bone (personality) – American personality (born 1982)
- Tito the Builder – Virginia politician
- Hannah Spencer – British politician (born 1991), also known as "Hannah the Plumber"
