= Barbara Riley =

Barbara Riley is the former director of the Ohio Department of Aging and the Ohio Department of Job and Family Services.

== Background ==
Riley has a BA in Sociology from Pennsylvania State University as well as a master's degree in Political Science and Public Policy from Washington University in St. Louis.

== State government service ==
Barbara Riley's Ohio state government service career started in 1990 when she was the Chief of the Health, Human Services and Justice Division of the Legislative Budget Office. In 2000, Riley was appointed deputy director of the Office for Children and Families within the ODJFS. In December 2004, Riley became the director of the ODJFS. In 2006, ODJFS took away the license for Lifeway For Youth, a nonprofit Christian-based placement agency, due to the death of a 3 year old boy. Riley, then the director of ODJFS, questioned "how the private placement agency Lifeway for Youth, Butler County Children Services and her own department failed the boy."

== Ohio Department of Aging ==
As director of the Ohio Department of Aging, Riley visited numerous senior centers and spoke about the state's long-term health care system. Riley has stated that one of the main challenges her department is facing is the aftermath of the baby boom. Riley has encouraged people to make their voice heard, get involved, and lobby their legislators.
