= List of members of the Ohio Cabinet =

The following is a list of members of the governor of Ohio's Cabinet. The cabinet of the Governor of Ohio includes the heads of the 26 departments of Ohio government established by statute. They inform and assist the governor in the operation of the state. Each is appointed by the governor and affirmed by the Ohio General Assembly.

- Director of the Adjutant General's Department: Major General John C. Harris, Jr.
- Director of the Ohio Department of Administrative Services: Director Robert Blair
- Director of the Ohio Department of Aging: Director Ursel J. McElroy
- Director of the Ohio Department of Agriculture: Director Brian Baldridge
- Chancellor of the Ohio Board of Regents: Chancellor John Carey
- Director of the Office of Budget and Management: Tim Keen
- Director of the Ohio Department of Commerce: Director Jacqueline T. Williams
- Director of the Ohio Development Services Agency: David Goodman
- Director of the Ohio Environmental Protection Agency: Craig W. Butler
- Director of the Ohio Department of Health: Director Lance Himes
- Director of the Office of Information Technology: Chief Information Officer Stu Davis
- Director of the Ohio Department of Insurance: Judith L. French
- Director of the Ohio Department of Job and Family Services: Cynthia C. Dungey
- Director of the Ohio Lottery Commission: Director Dennis Berg
- Director of the Ohio Department of Mental Health and Addiction Services: Director Tracy J. Plouck
- Director of the Ohio Department of Developmental Disabilities: Jeff Davis
- Director of the Ohio Department of Natural Resources: Mary Mertz
- Director of the Ohio Department of Public Safety: John Born
- Director of the Ohio Department of Rehabilitation and Correction: Gary C. Mohr
- Commissioner of the Ohio Department of Taxation: Tax Commissioner Joe Testa
- Director of the Ohio Department of Transportation: Jerry Wray
- Director of the Ohio Department of Veterans Services: Deborah Ashenhurst
- Administrator of the Ohio Bureau of Workers' Compensation: Steve Buehrer
- Director of the Ohio Department of Youth Services: Harvey Reed
