= Cabinet of the Governor of Ohio =

The statutes of the State of Ohio have established 26 departments of government which are responsible to the Governor. These departments are led by the Director, or in some cases the Commissioner, who must inform and assist the governor in the operation of the state. After the governor appoints the potential director, they must be affirmed by the Ohio Senate.

No limit nor imposition are placed upon the terms, except in the cases that they may be replaced by the current governor, or they resign their term. In turn, the directors may appoint their own staff.

Since the governor appoints the Directors, they are directly incorporated into the Executive branch of Ohio. This gives them the broad authority to enforce the laws of Ohio directly. Many of these Departments issue administrative opinions, proceedings, and decisions, which in turn have the legal influence of stare decisis.

Notices and proposed rules are published in the Register of Ohio, which are codified in the Ohio Administrative Code (OAC).

== List of departments ==
There are several cabinet or administrative departments:

- Ohio National Guard
- Department of Administrative Services
- Department of Aging
- Department of Agriculture
- Office of Budget and Management
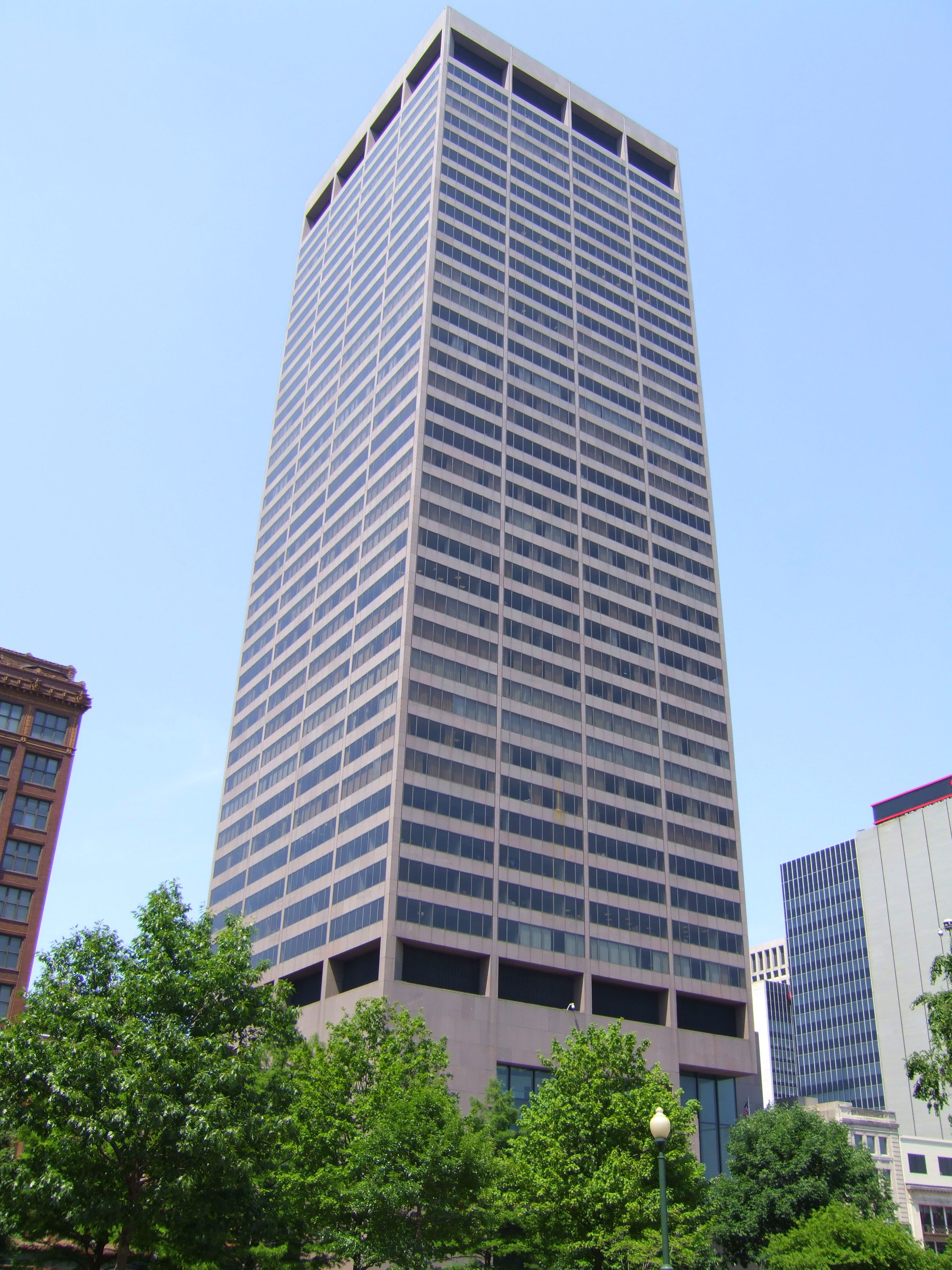
  The Rhodes State Office Tower in Columbus
- Department of Commerce
- Development Services Agency
- Department of Developmental Disabilities
- Department of Education
- Environmental Protection Agency
- Department of Health
- Office of the Inspector General
- Department of Insurance
- Department of Job and Family Services
- Department of Medicaid
- Department of Mental Health and Addiction Services
- Department of Natural Resources
- Department of Public Safety
- Public Utilities Commission
- Board of Regents
- Department of Rehabilitation and Correction
- Department of Taxation
- Department of Transportation
- Department of Veterans Services
- Bureau of Workers' Compensation
- Department of Youth Services

Members of the Cabinet are listed at List of members of the Ohio Cabinet
