= Government of Ohio =

Government of the U.S. state of Ohio

- Logo of the Ohioan government Great Seal of the State of Ohio
- Polity type: Presidential republic Federated state
- Constitution: Constitution of Ohio

Legislative branch
- Name: General Assembly
- Type: Bicameral
- Meeting place: Ohio Statehouse
- Upper house
- Name: Senate
- Presiding officer: Rob McColley, President
- Lower house
- Name: House of Representatives
- Presiding officer: Matt Huffman, Speaker

Executive branch
- Head of state and government
- Title: Governor
- Currently: Mike DeWine
- Appointer: Election
- Cabinet
- Name: Cabinet
- Leader: Governor
- Deputy leader: Lieutenant Governor
- Headquarters: Ohio Statehouse

Judicial branch
- Name: Judiciary of Ohio
- Courts: Courts of Ohio
- Supreme Court
- Chief judge: Sharon Kennedy
- Seat: Thomas J. Moyer Ohio Judicial Center, Columbus

Logo for the State of Ohio.

The government of the U.S. state of Ohio consists of the executive, judicial, and legislative branches. Its basic structure is set forth in the Constitution and law of Ohio.

== Executive branch ==
The daily administration of the state’s laws are carried out by six elected statewide officials; the chief executive the governor, and their second in command the lieutenant governor, the secretary of state, the attorney general, the state treasurer, the state auditor, and by the staff and employees of the executive branch agencies.

Statewide Elected Executive Officials
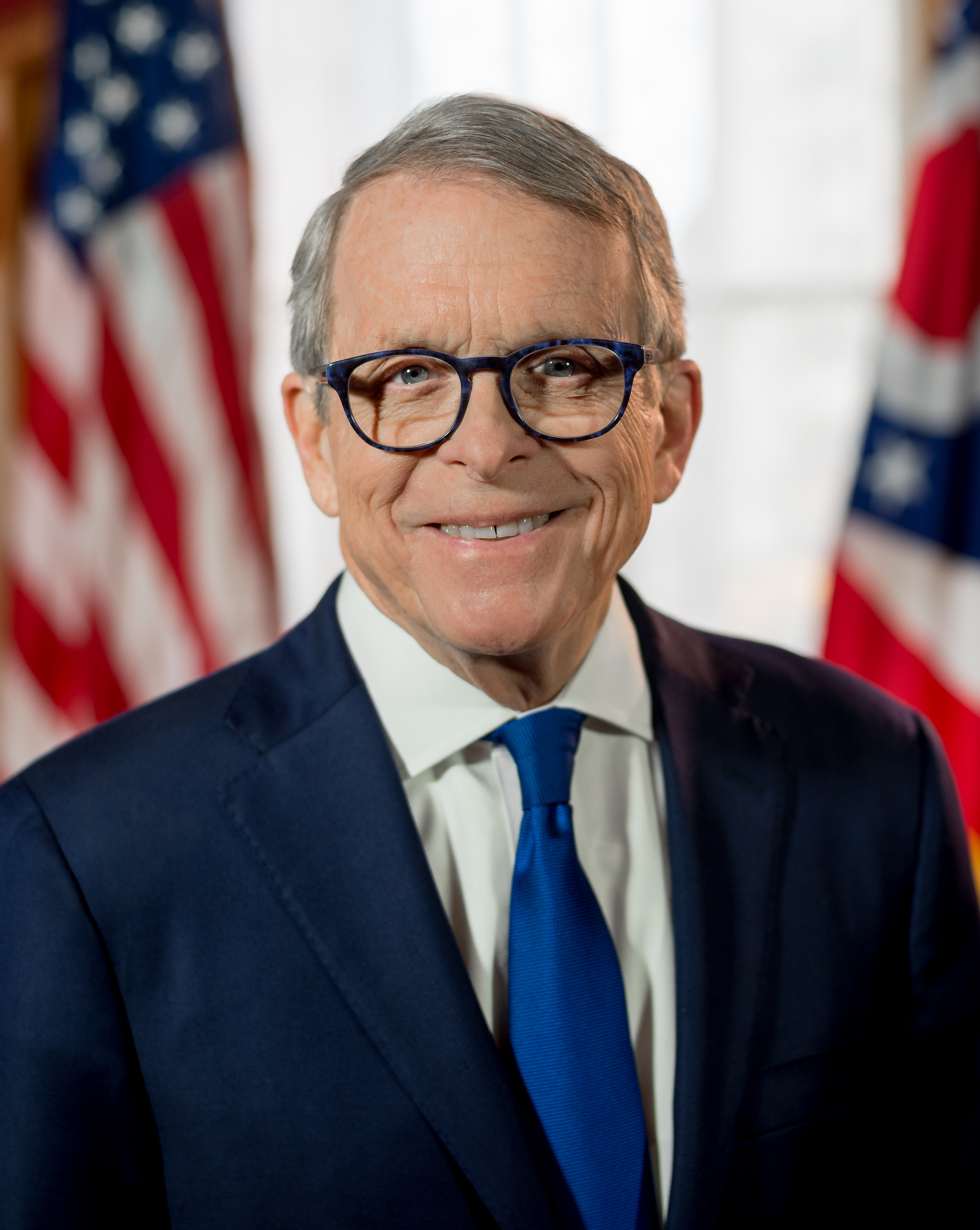
Mike DeWine (R)
Governor

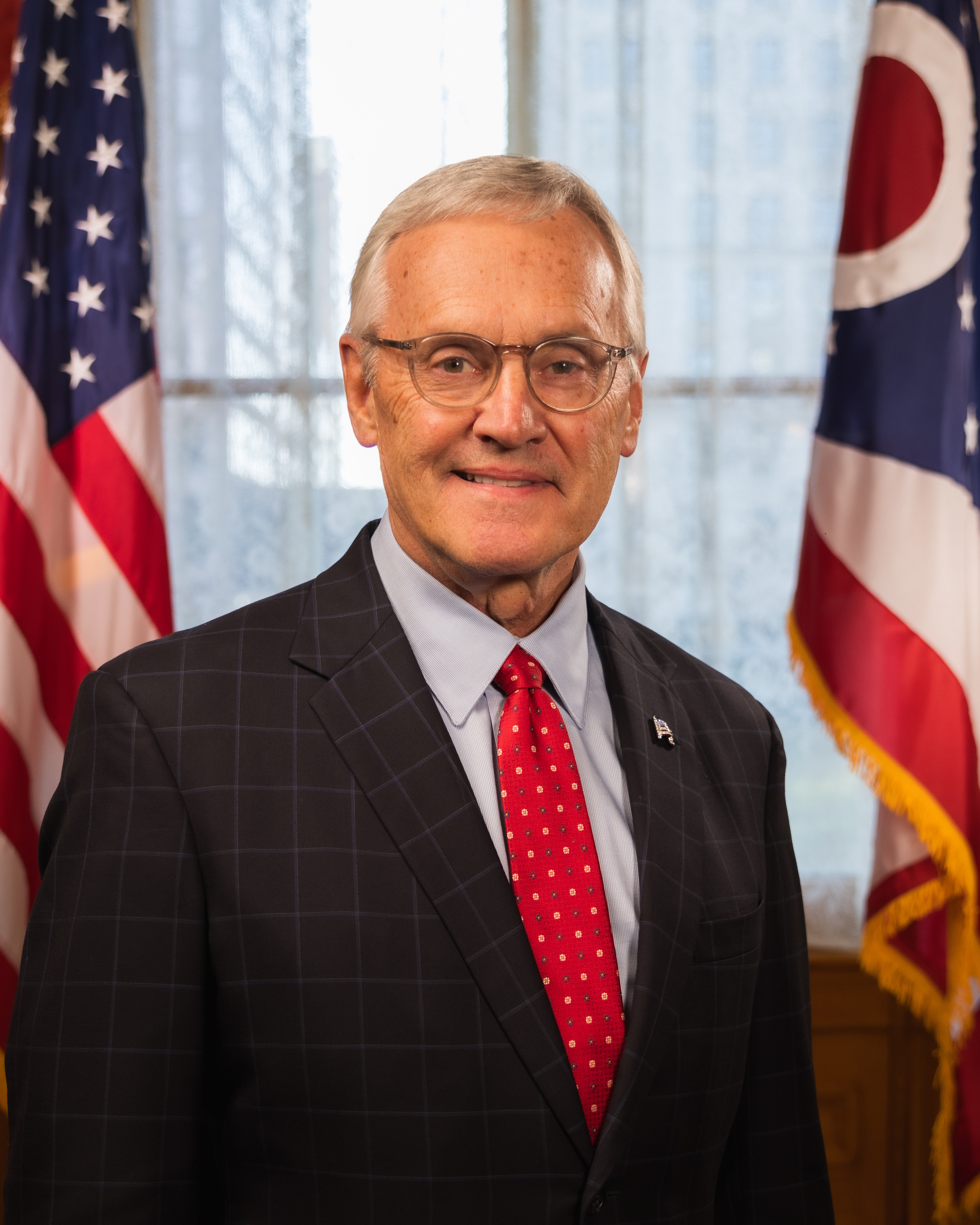
Jim Tressel (R)
Lieutenant Governor

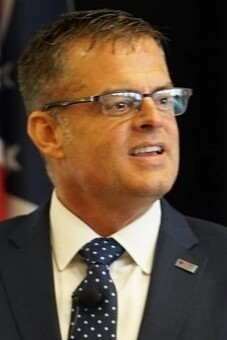
Andy Wilson (R)
Attorney General

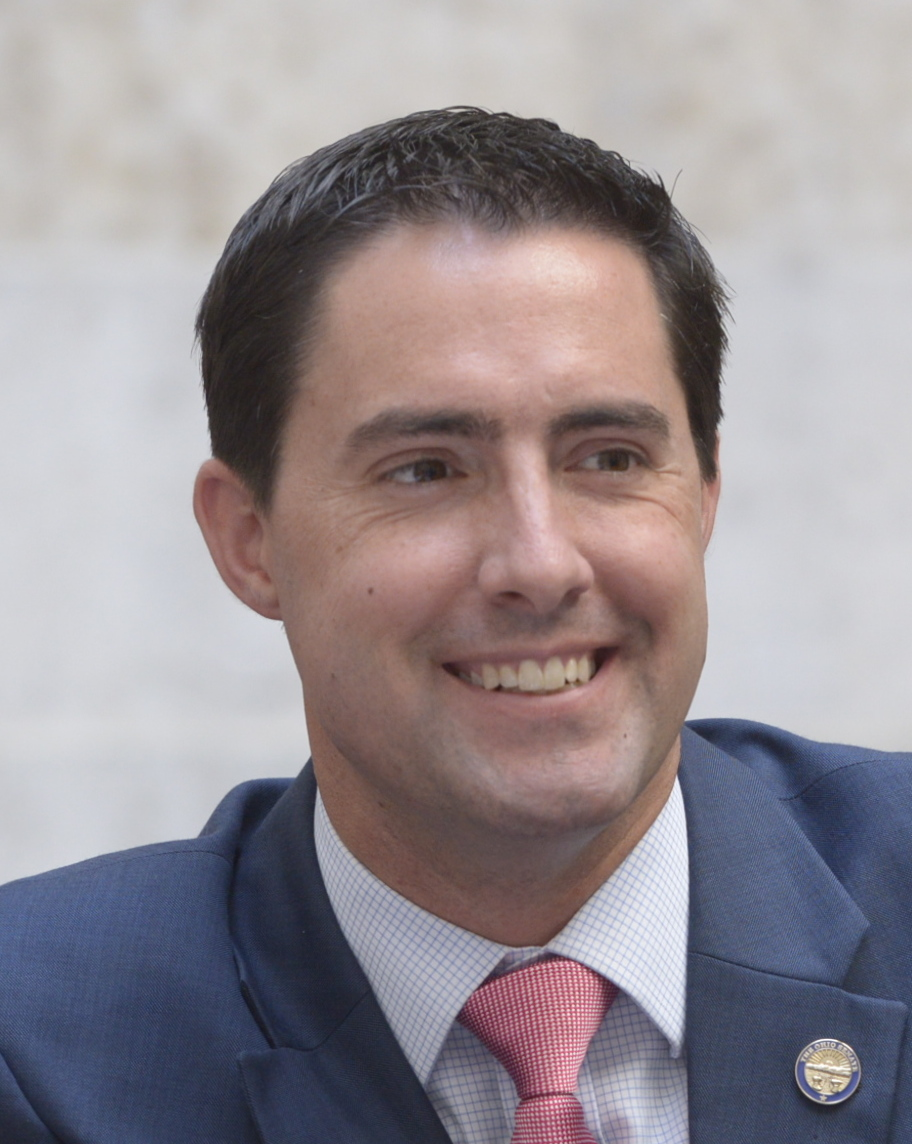
Frank LaRose (R)
Secretary of State

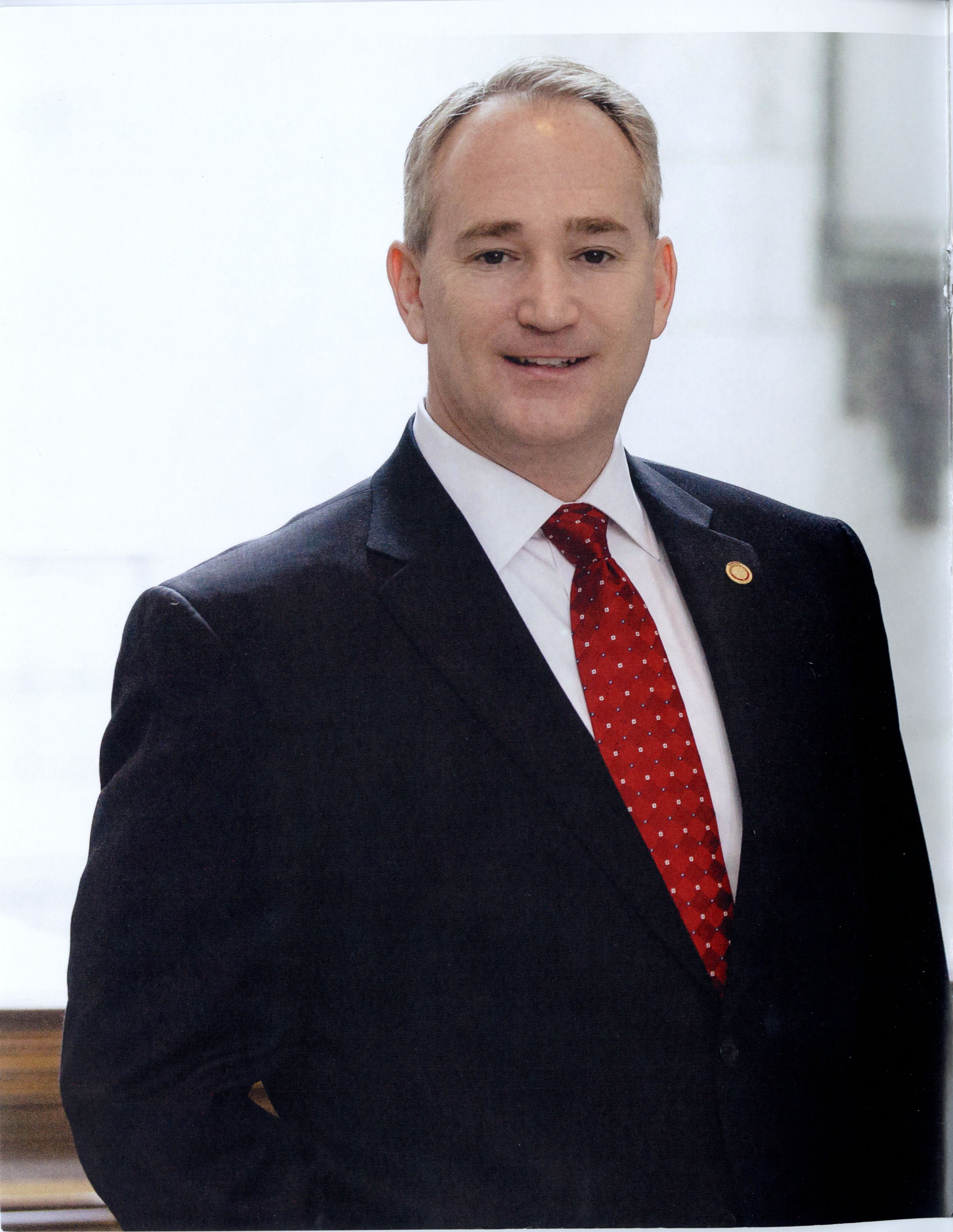
Keith Faber (R)
State Auditor

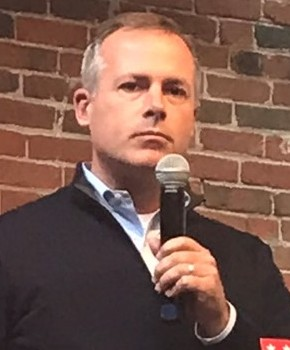
Robert Sprague (R)
State Treasurer

All are elected statewide for four-year terms, all on a partisan ballot, with the Governor and Lieutenant Governor elected on a single ticket.

=== Departments ===
The state government is primarily organized into several cabinet or administrative departments:

- Department of Administrative Services
- Department of Aging
- Department of Agriculture
- Office of Budget and Management
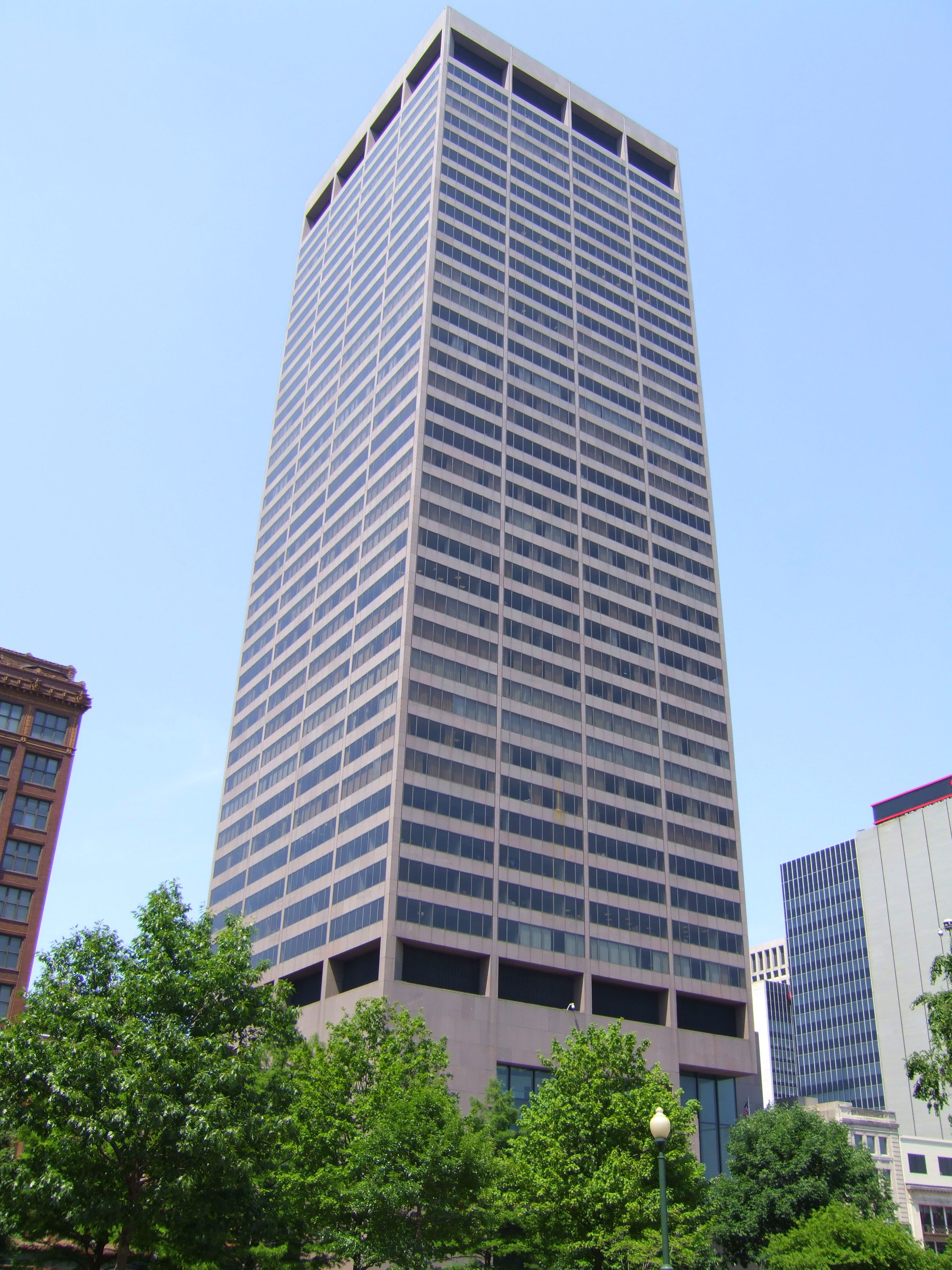
  The Rhodes State Office Tower in Columbus
- Department of Commerce
- Department of Development
- Department of Developmental Disabilities
- Department of Education
- Environmental Protection Agency
- Department of Health
- Department of Insurance
- Department of Job and Family Services
- Department of Medicaid
- Department of Mental Health and Addiction Services
- Department of Natural Resources
- Department of Public Safety
- Department of Rehabilitation and Correction
- Department of Taxation
- Department of Transportation
- Department of Veterans Services
- Department of Youth Services

Notices and proposed rules are published in the Register of Ohio, which are codified in the Ohio Administrative Code (OAC).

== Legislative branch ==
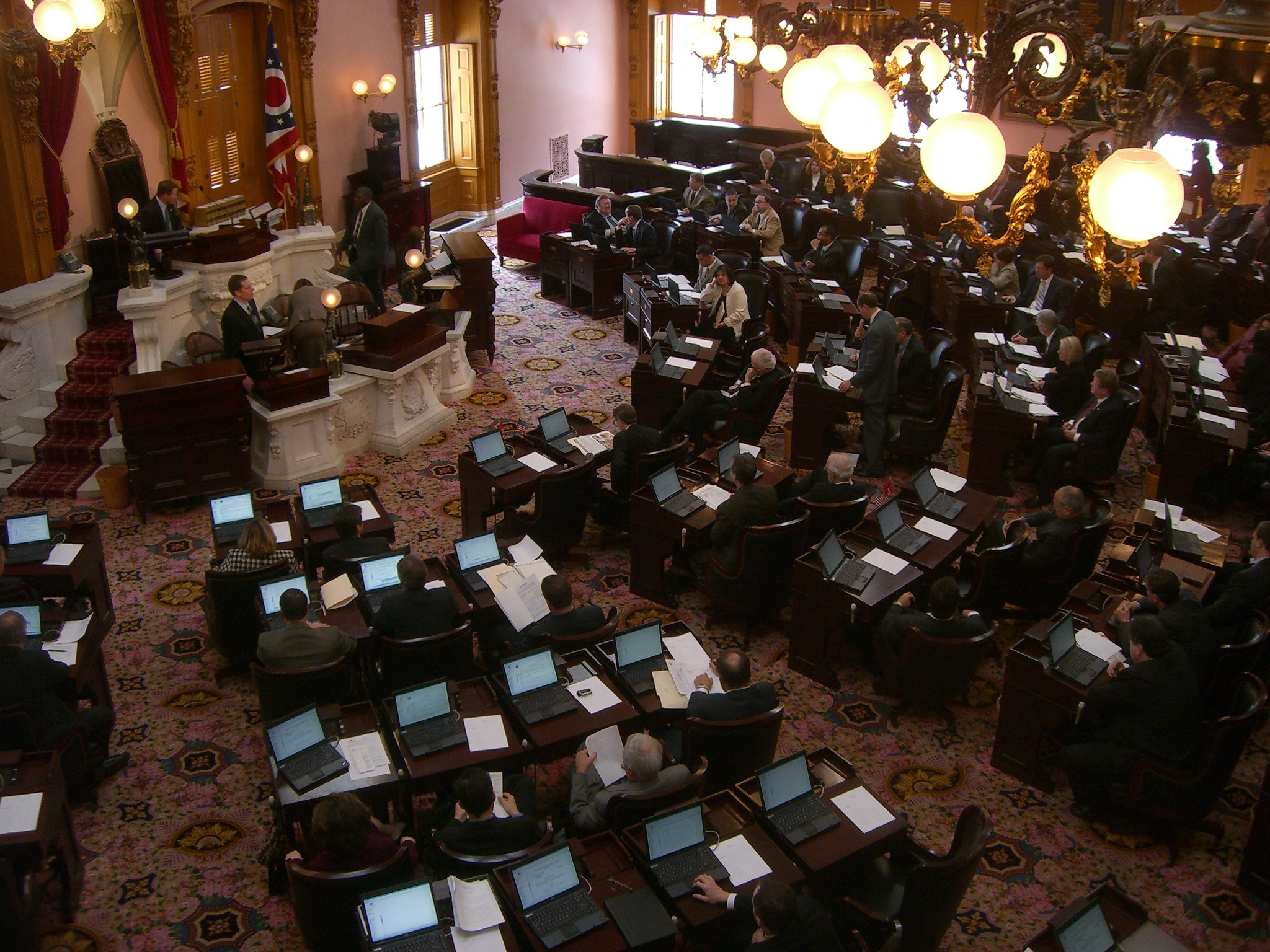
The House of Representatives Chamber of the Ohio Statehouse

The legislative branch, the Ohio General Assembly, is made up of two houses: the Senate and the House of Representatives. The House of Representatives is composed of 99 members elected from single-member districts of equal population. Each of the 33 senate districts is formed by combining three house districts. Senators serve four-year staggered terms and representatives serve two-year terms. The General Assembly, with the approval of the Governor, draws the U.S. congressional district lines for Ohio's 15 seats in the United States House of Representatives. The Ohio Apportionment Board draws state legislative district lines in Ohio.

In order to be enacted into law, a bill must be adopted by both houses of the General Assembly and signed by the Governor. If the Governor vetoes a bill, the General Assembly can override the veto with a three-fifths supermajority of both houses. A bill will also become a law if the Governor fails to sign or veto it within 10 days of its being presented. The session laws are published in the official Laws of Ohio. These in turn have been codified in the Ohio Revised Code.

== Judicial branch ==
The judicial branch is headed by the Ohio Supreme Court, which has one chief justice and six associate justices, each elected to staggered six-year terms.

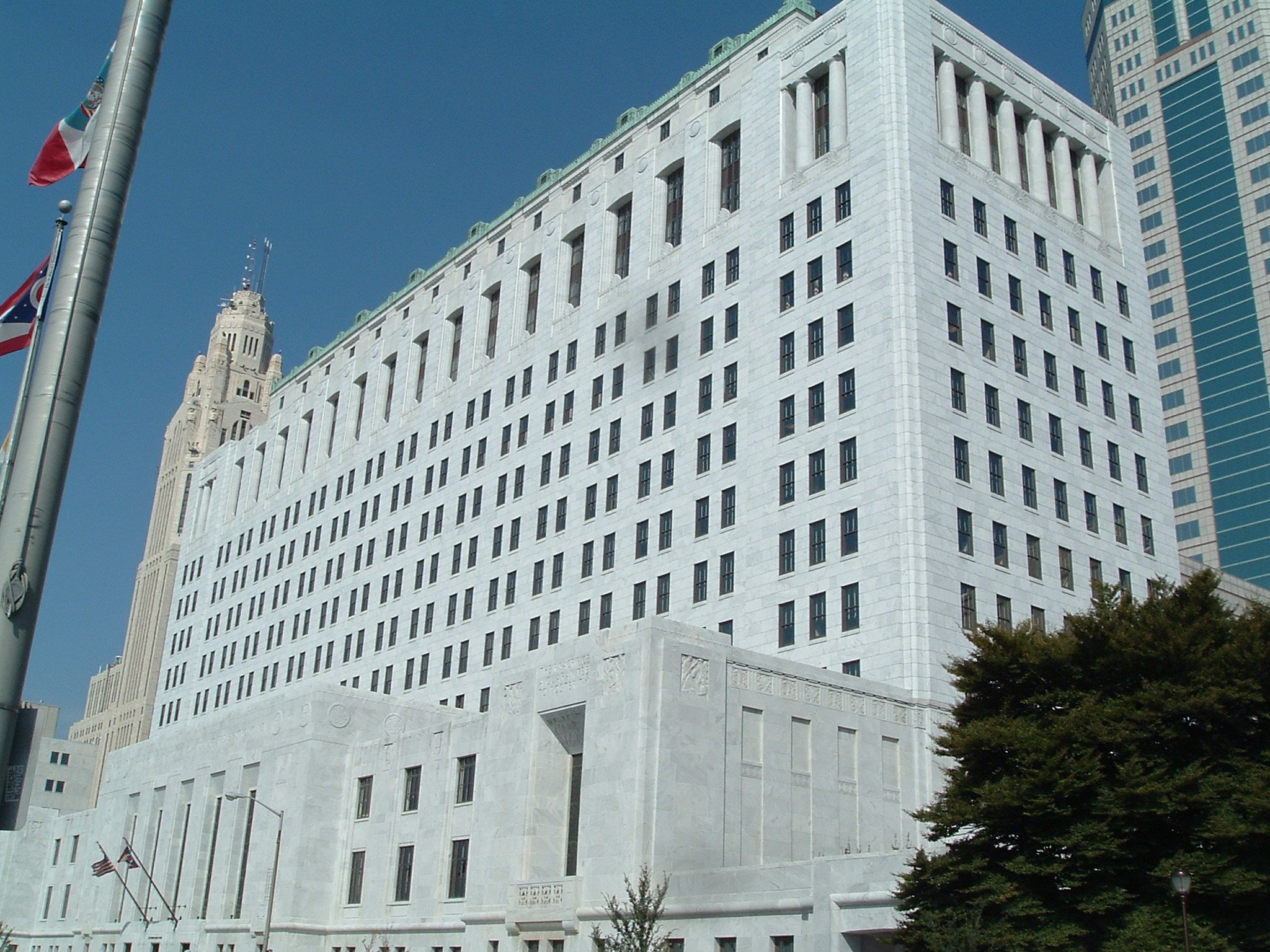
The Ohio Supreme Court building in Columbus

There are several other levels of elected judiciary in the Ohio court system:

- State court of claims, which has jurisdiction over all civil actions against the State of Ohio in situations in which the state has waived its sovereign immunity.
- State courts of appeal (12 district appeals courts): These are the intermediate appellate courts.
- County courts of common pleas: 88 county common pleas courts – These are the principal courts of first instance for civil and criminal matters. In populous areas, there are often several divisions, such as general, juvenile, probate, and domestic relations.
- Municipal courts and county courts – these courts primarily handle minor matters, such as traffic adjudication and other misdemeanor and small claims.

Judges in Ohio are generally elected, except for the Court of Claims, for which judges sit by assignment of the chief justice. When there are temporary vacancies in elected judgeships, those vacancies are also filled by assignment by the chief justice.

== Local government ==
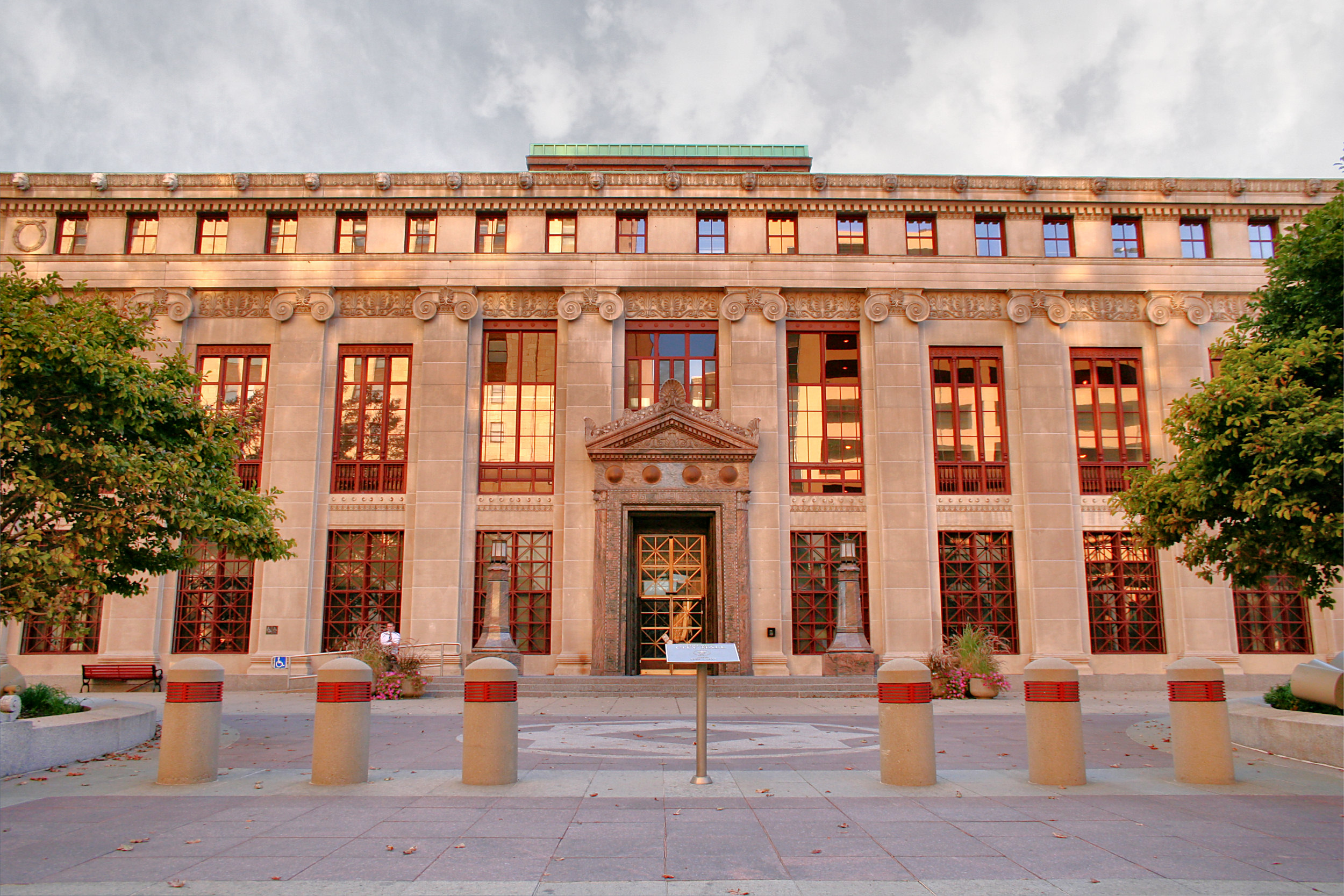
Columbus City Hall

There are also several levels of local government in Ohio: counties, municipalities (cities and villages), townships, special districts and school districts.

Ohio is divided into 88 counties. Ohio law defines a structure for county government, although they may adopt charters for home rule. Summit County and Cuyahoga County have chosen an alternate form of government. The other counties have a government with a three-member board of county commissioners, a sheriff, coroner, auditor, treasurer, clerk of the court of common pleas prosecutor, engineer, and recorder.

There are two kinds of incorporated municipalities, 251 cities and 681 villages. If a municipality has five thousand or more residents as of the last United States Census it is a city, otherwise it is a village. Municipalities have full home rule powers, may adopt a charter, ordinances and resolutions for self-government. Each municipality chooses its own form of government, but most have elected mayors and city councils or city commissions. City governments provide much more extensive services than county governments, such as police forces and paid (as opposed to volunteer) fire departments.

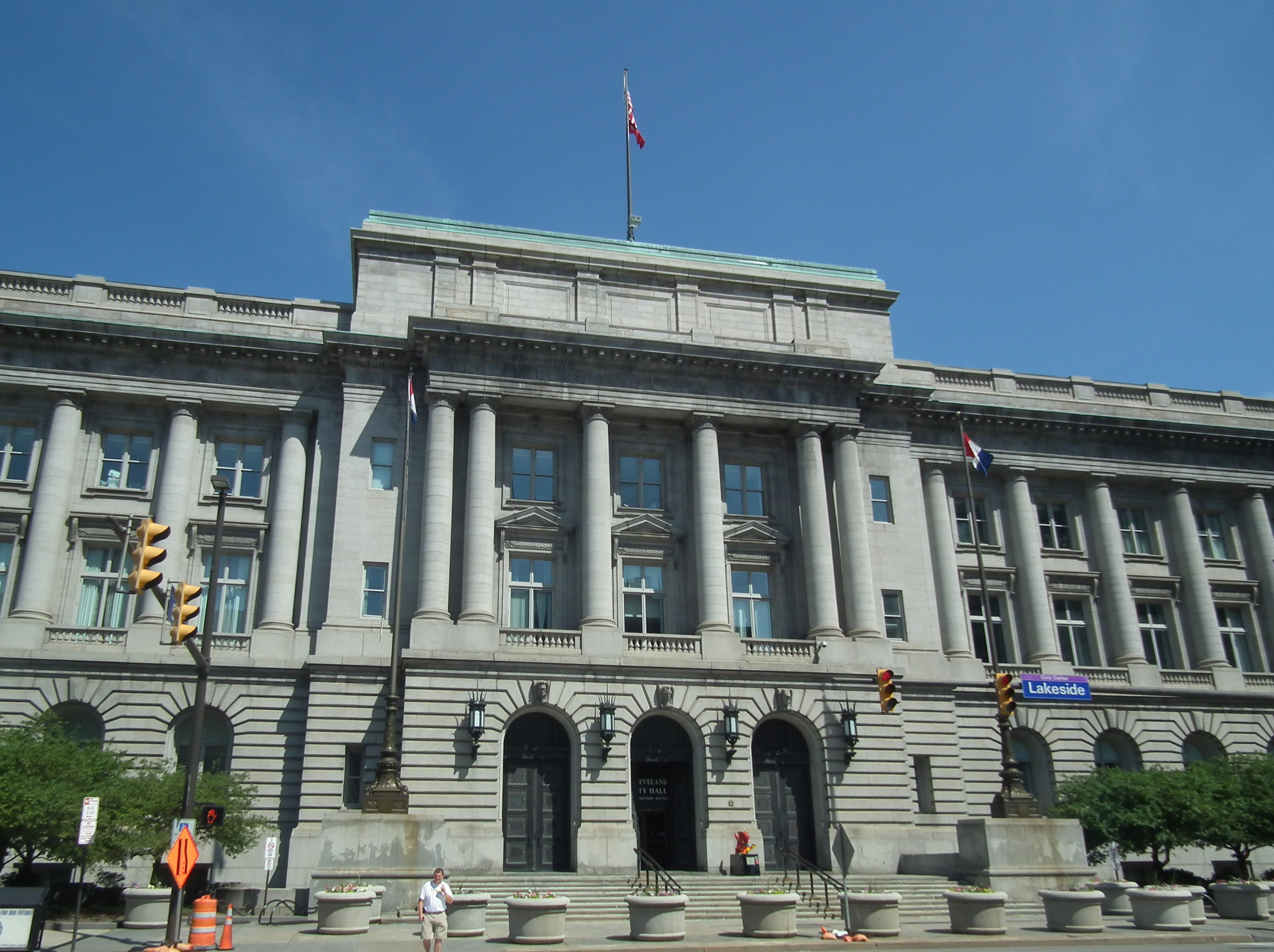
Cleveland City Hall

The entire area of the state is encompassed by townships. When the boundaries of a township are coterminous with the boundaries of a city or village, the township ceases to exist as a separate government (called a paper township). Townships are governed by a three-member board of township trustees. Townships may have limited home rule powers.

There are more than 600 city, local, and exempted village school districts providing K-12 education in Ohio, as well as about four dozen joint vocation school districts which are separate from the K-12 districts. Each city school district, local school district, or exempted village school district is governed by an elected board of education. A school district previously under state supervision (municipal school district) may be governed by a board whose members either are elected or appointed by the mayor of the municipality containing the greatest portion of the district's area.

== See also ==
- Politics of Ohio
- Law of Ohio
