= Ohio Judicial Center =

Offices and courtroom of the Ohio Supreme Court in Columbus

Thomas J. Moyer Ohio Judicial Center
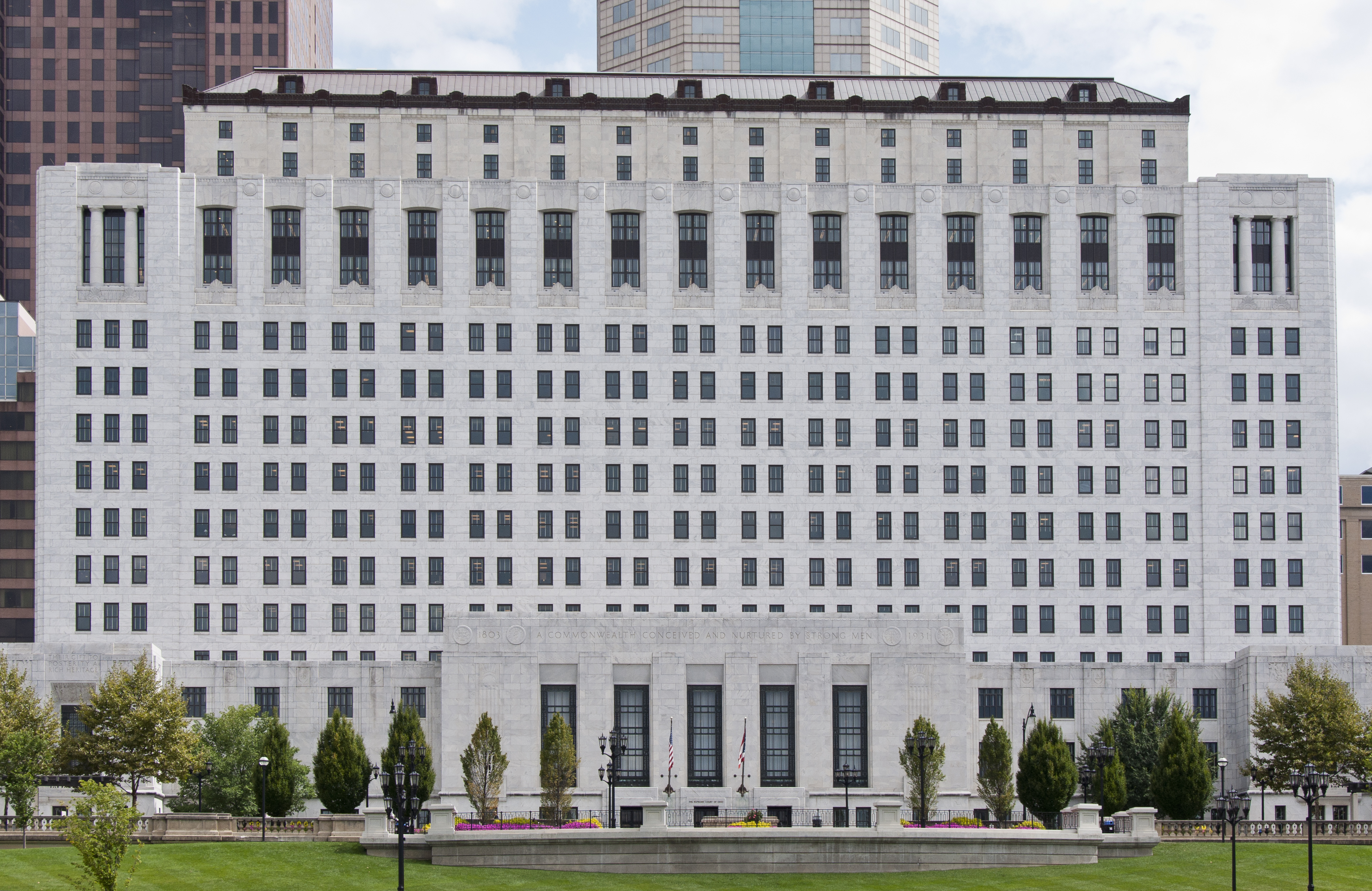
- Former names: Ohio State Office Building, Ohio Departments of State Building
- Alternative names: Ohio Judicial Center, Moyer Judicial Center

General information
- Architectural style: Art Deco
- Location: 65 South Front Street, Columbus, Ohio
- Named for: Chief Justice Thomas J. Moyer
- Construction started: 1930
- Completed: 1933
- Inaugurated: 1933; May 15, 2004
- Renovated: 2001-04
- Cost: $6.5 million

Technical details
- Material: Concrete, marble, copper
- Floor count: 14
- Floor area: 415,000 sq ft (38,600 m^{2})
- Grounds: 2.1 acres (0.85 ha)

Design and construction
- Architect: Harry Hake

Website
- www.sconet.state.oh.us/MJC
- Ohio State Office Building
- U.S. National Register of Historic Places
- Interactive map of Ohio State Office Building
- Coordinates: 39°57′37″N 83°00′09″W
- NRHP reference No.: 90001908 (original); 100007452 (increase)

Significant dates
- Added to NRHP: December 18, 1990
- Boundary increase: February 17, 2022

The Thomas J. Moyer Ohio Judicial Center is a state courthouse, office building, and library in Columbus, Ohio, in the city's downtown Civic Center. The building is the headquarters of the Supreme Court of Ohio, the state's highest court, as well as the Ohio Court of Claims and Ohio Judicial Conference. The judicial center is named after the court's former chief justice Thomas J. Moyer.

The building was designed by Harry Hake in the Art Deco style. It was built from 1930 to 1933, known as the Ohio Departments Building, as it first housed Ohio state departments. The building was added to the National Register of Historic Places in 1990. Beginning in 2001, an extensive renovation restored the building, and set it up to be used for the Supreme Court of Ohio. The building reopened in 2004, marking the first time the court was established in a building solely for the judiciary, and the first time the building was open to the public.

== History ==
The Supreme Court of Ohio was founded in the state constitution, approved in 1802. It was located in the Ohio Statehouse beginning in 1857 and moved into the Statehouse Annex in 1901. In the next few decades, Ohio's government added more employees within the statehouse buildings, with multiple departments outgrowing their spaces there. The idea to house these departments was first proposed in 1913. The first consolidation took place in 1921 with multiple departments moving into the Hartman Hotel, with no renovation since its operation as a hotel. Discussion of whether to build a new structure shifted to where to build and how to finance the construction. In 1929, the city of Columbus donated 2.1 acres (0.85 ha) to the state for the offices, spurring further development of the project.

Land was cleared at the site in 1930. One of the buildings razed for the new office building was a White Castle restaurant, the first of this chain opened in Columbus. The building, at 49 S. Front Street, opened five months prior, on June 3, 1929.

Cincinnati-based architect Harry Hake was hired to design the building. He wrote 292 pages of specifications, a design estimated at $5 million, with $1.5 million of that used to purchase additional property, financed by a statewide property tax. Construction was tumultuous, with Hake having been hired just three months before the start of the Great Depression. The building's construction began in 1930, often delayed by labor disputes. During construction, on April 14, 1932, a gas explosion significantly damaged the building, killing 11 people and injuring 50. Multiple windows were destroyed, along with staircases up to the fifth floor, and the bronze doors on the building's west side were blown off their hinges. Repairs were made promptly, adding a cost of $750,000, bringing the cost to over $6.5 million. The building was completed in 1933.

The building was named the Ohio Departments Building, as it housed the Industrial Commission of Ohio, State Library of Ohio, Ohioana Library Association, and the departments of Aeronautics, Agriculture, Commerce, Education, Health, Highways, Public Welfare, Public Works, Industrial Relations and Taxation. During Ohio Statehouse renovations in the early 1990s, the building was also home to the Ohio House of Representatives.

In 1997, the Ohio government set aside funds to move the Supreme Court of Ohio to the Ohio Departments Building; the court had been located in the Rhodes State Office Tower since 1974. In 1998, the Ohio General Assembly approved renovations to the building which would convert it into the judicial center. Columbus-based architecture firm Schooley Caldwell was hired to make the renovations. Beginning in 2001, the building's detailwork was restored, while its utilities were modernized. The Grand Concourse and original hearing rooms were restored, and the State Library was converted to the Supreme Court Law Library. Completed in 2004, the building reopened on February 17, and the Supreme Court of Ohio became its largest tenant. It marked the first time the court was established in a building solely for the judiciary, and the first time the building was open to the public. Its reopening ceremony was attended by then-U.S. Chief Justice William Rehnquist, Thomas J. Moyer, and about 170 other judges.

== Operations ==
The building is home to the Supreme Court of Ohio, the state's highest court, as well as the Ohio Court of Claims and Ohio Judicial Conference.

== Attributes and design ==
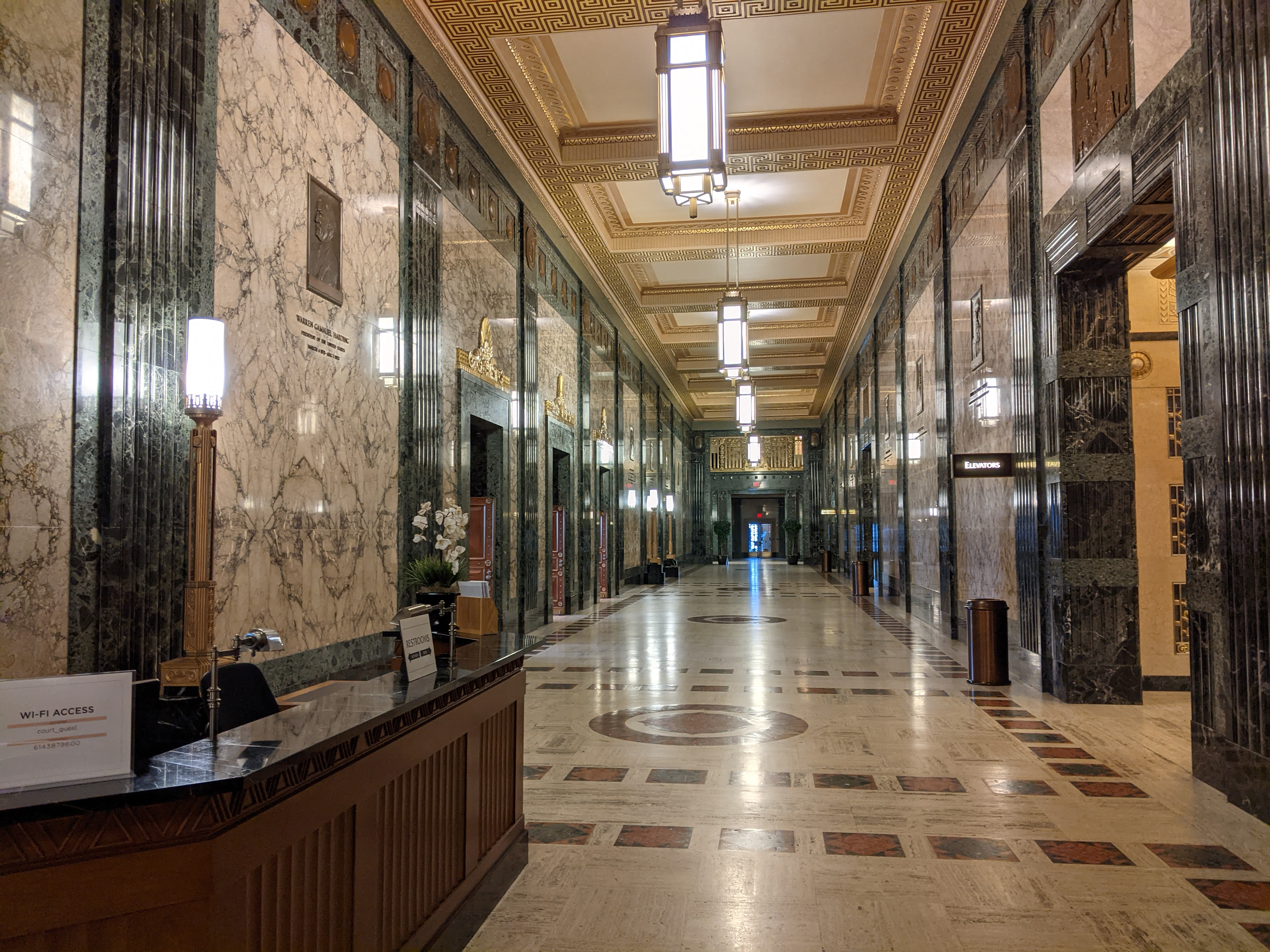
The Grand Concourse

It is located on South Front St., on the east bank of the Scioto River. The building was carefully planned on the center of the riverfront, with reflecting pools, lawns terraces, trees, and shrubs situated around it. The Scioto Mile Promenade, completed in 2015, lies directly across from it.

The building was designed by Cincinnati-based architect Harry Hake. It has 14 stories, white marble exterior facades, and Art Deco designs detailed with metals, tiles, colored marble, mosaics, and murals. The streamline shape of the building depicts its function through its large exterior mass. Its office space is expressed by its large, unadorned middle shaft, while its public lobbies and hearing rooms are expressed through the projecting stories on its west side. The State Library of Ohio was represented through the large windows at the top of the building, with its stack area in the stepped-back building crown.

The building's Civic Center Drive entrance has three sets of heavy bronze doors, sculpted by Alvin Meyer. The doors have bronze cast panels depicting elements of early American history, including Ohio's mounds. The doors are overlaid with large bronze grills silhouetting Native American tribal symbols. The state and federal seals are carved between each door, with their respective flag flying above each.

The judicial center features about 170 works of art between its interior, exterior, and grounds. The works, primarily by Ohio artists, were together valued at $935,000 around 2008. The collection includes Gavel, a massive gavel sculpture created in 2008 and installed in the south reflecting pool on the building's grounds. The sculpture is the largest and most expensive at the judicial center.

=== Interior ===
The judicial center's first floor holds the Grand Concourse, its courtroom, hearing room, and a meeting room. Its ground floor includes the Civic Center Lobby and Visitor Education Center. The eleventh floor holds the Law Library, including a reading room and art galleries. The courtroom was formerly the building's largest hearing room, while the Law Library was converted from its former use as the State Library of Ohio.

=== Visitor Education Center ===
The building's Visitor Education Center includes exhibits about the history, role and responsibility of the Ohio court system. Free tours are available to the public on weekdays between 9:00 am and 4:00 pm.

== Gallery ==
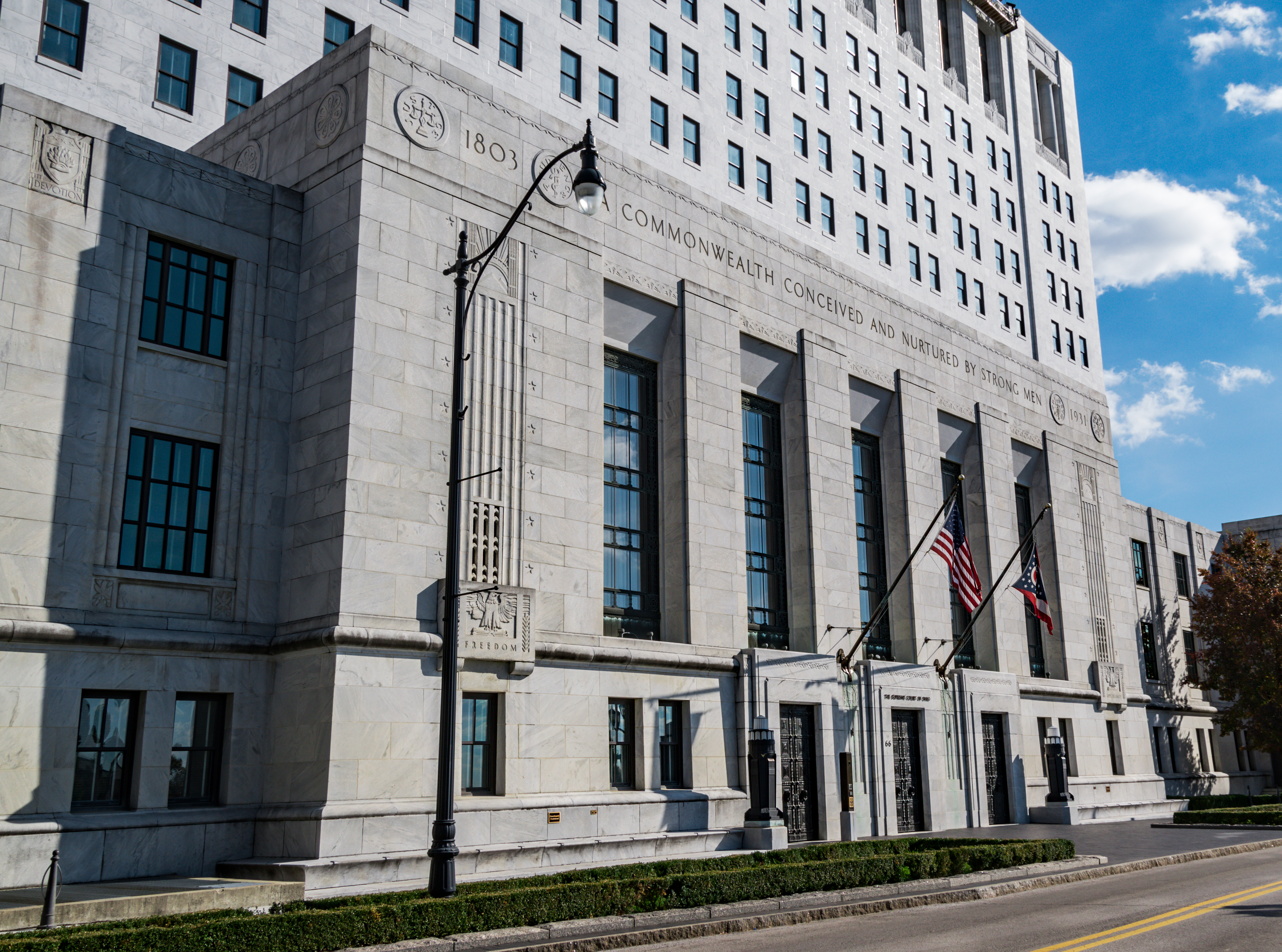
West entranceway

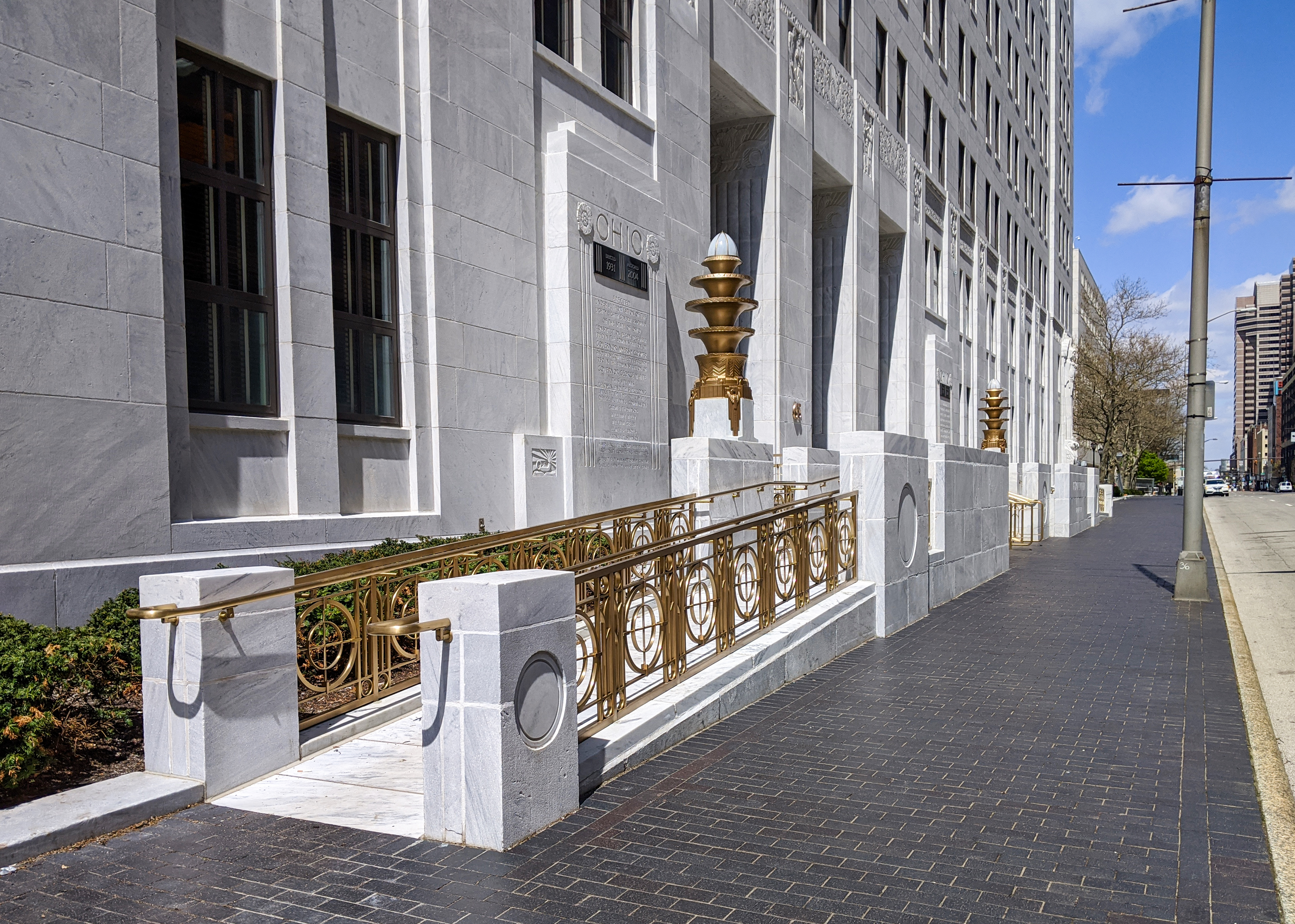
East entrance

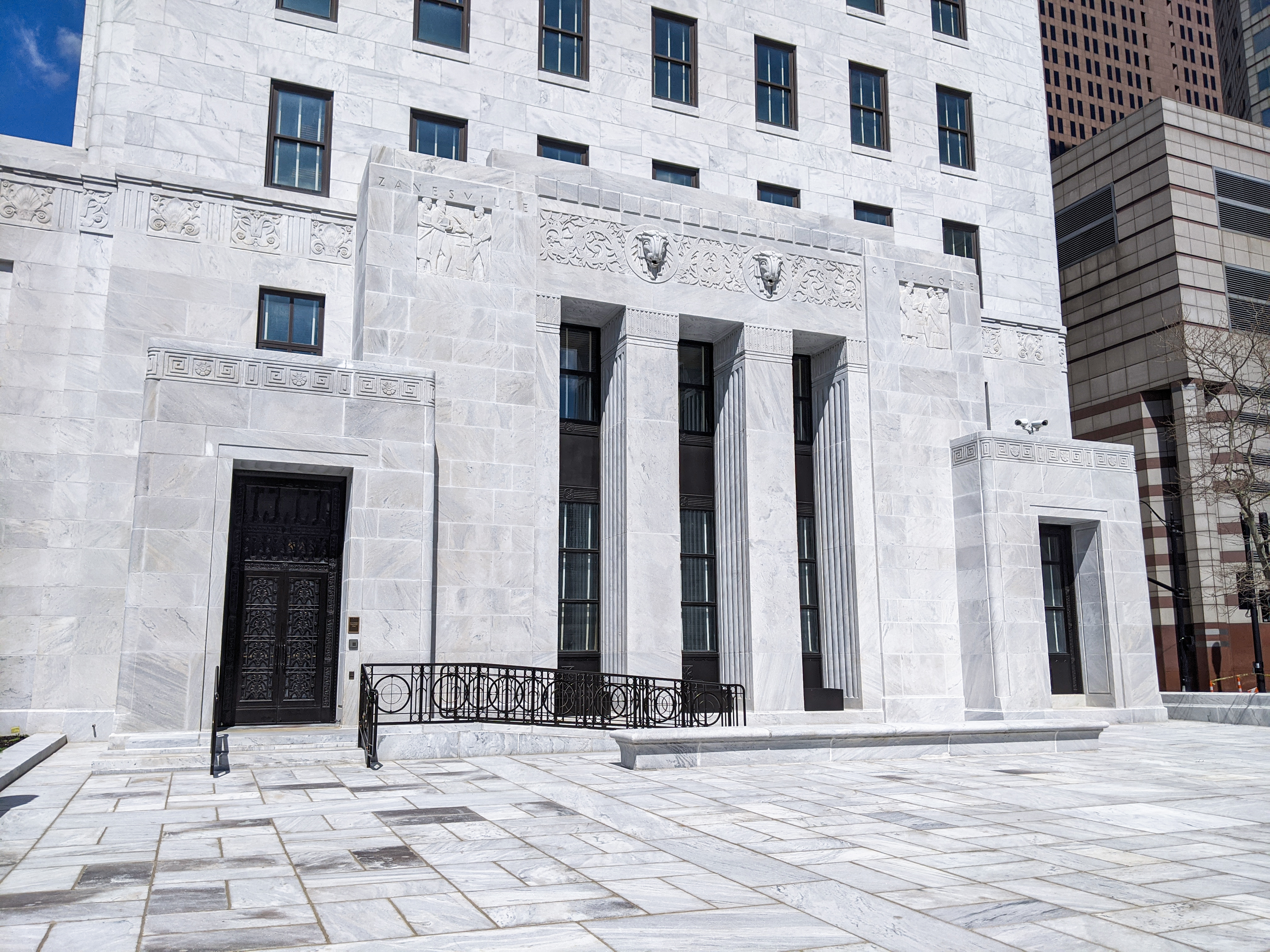
South facade

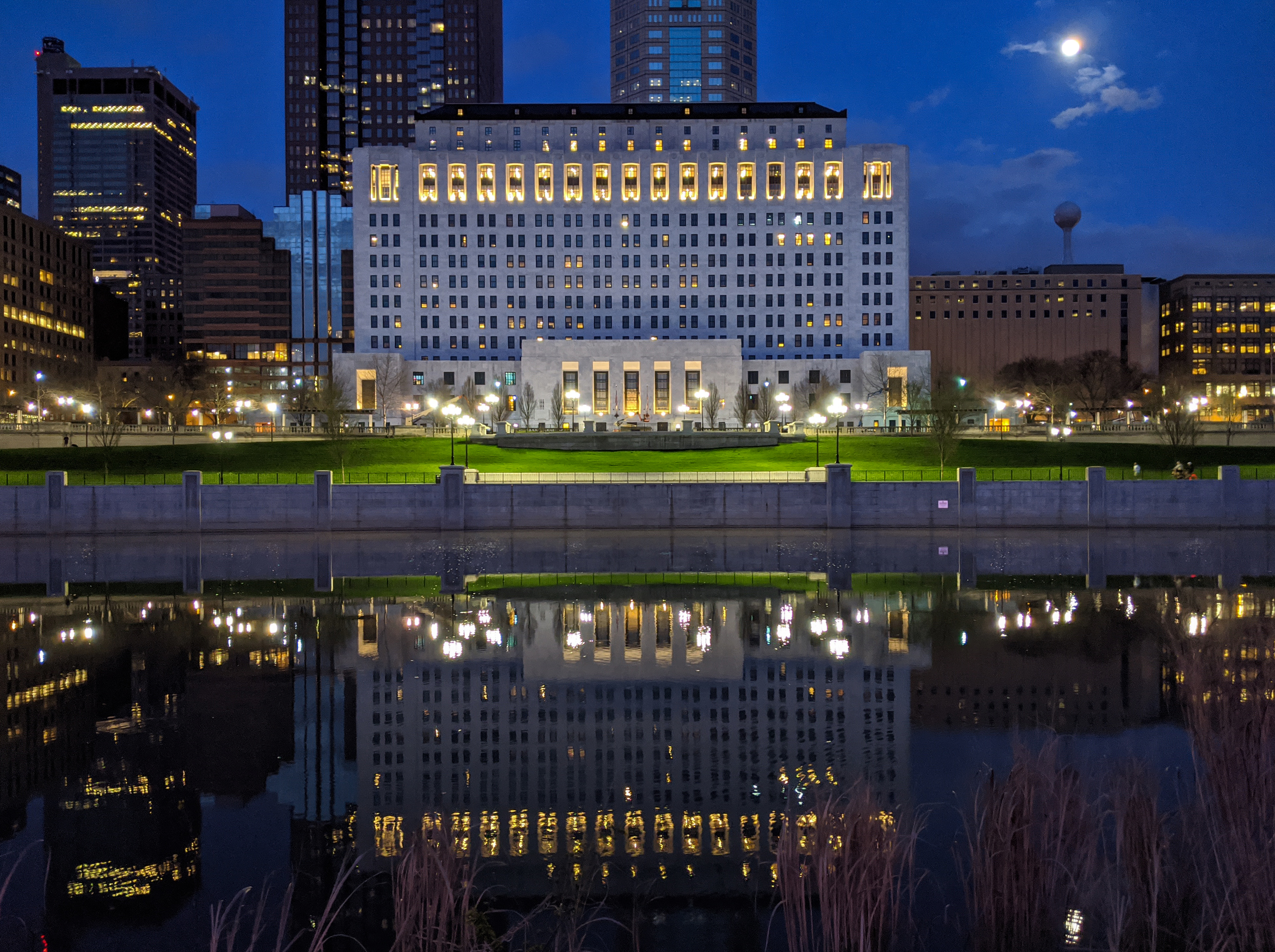
At night

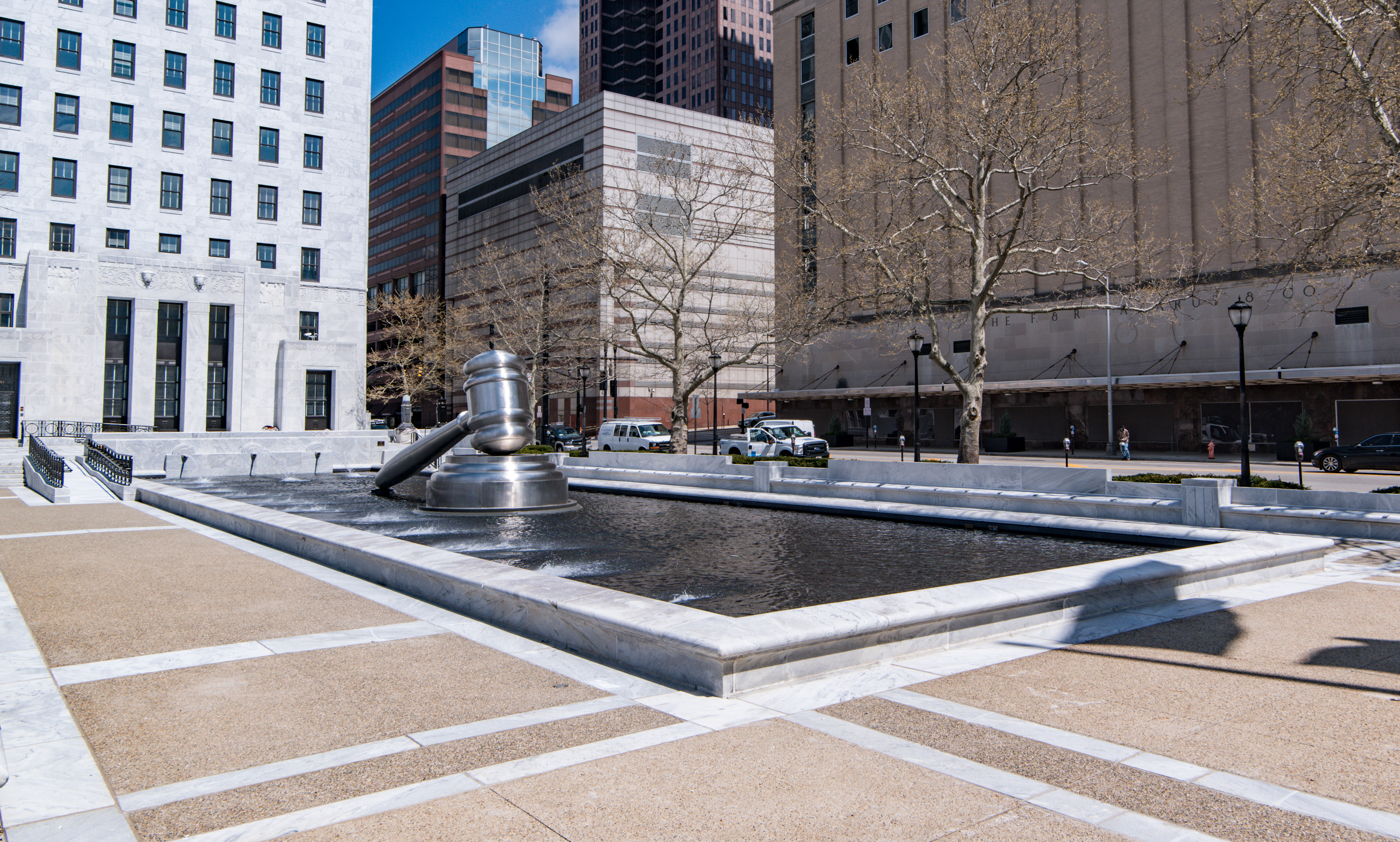
Gavel sculpture

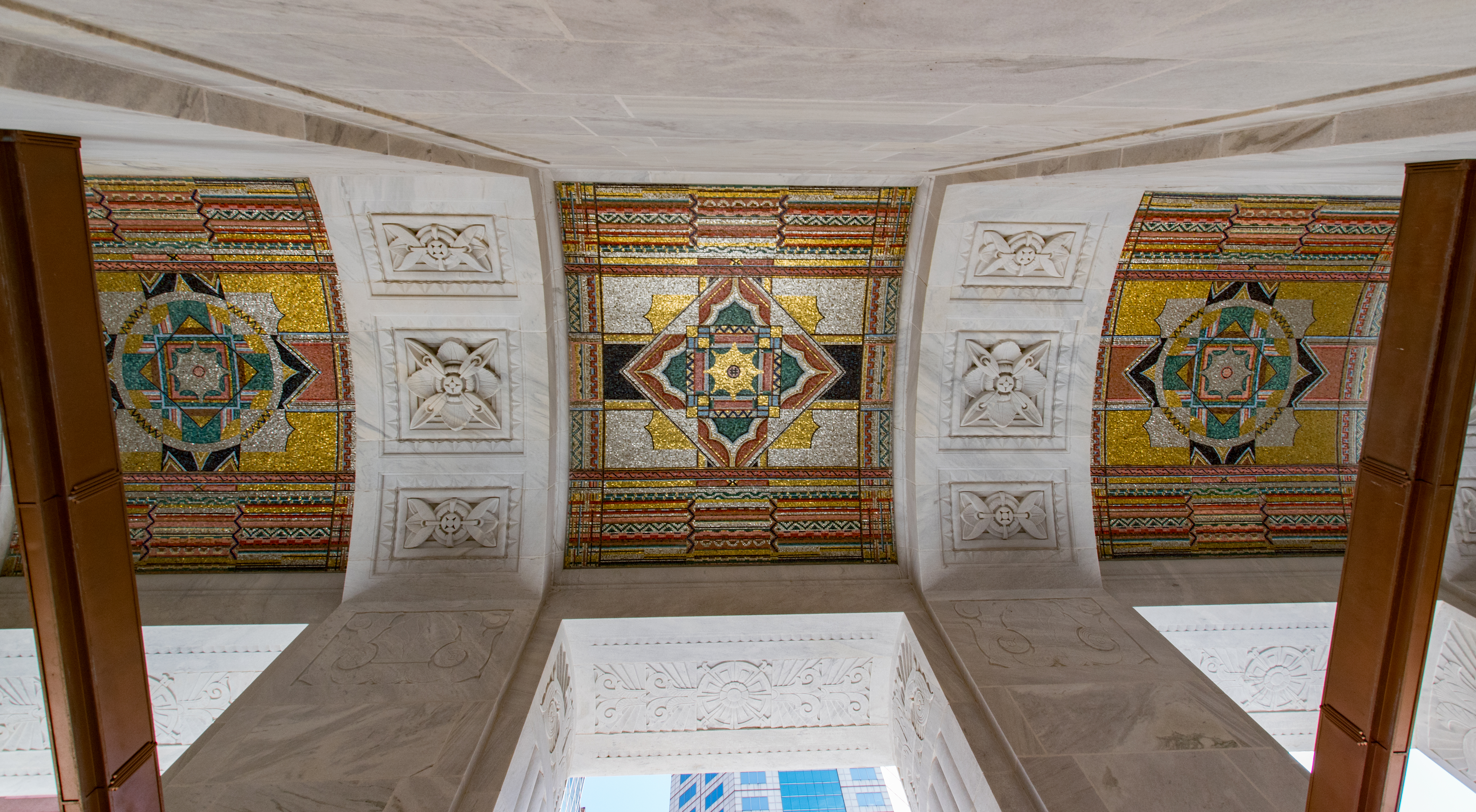
Mosaic ceilings

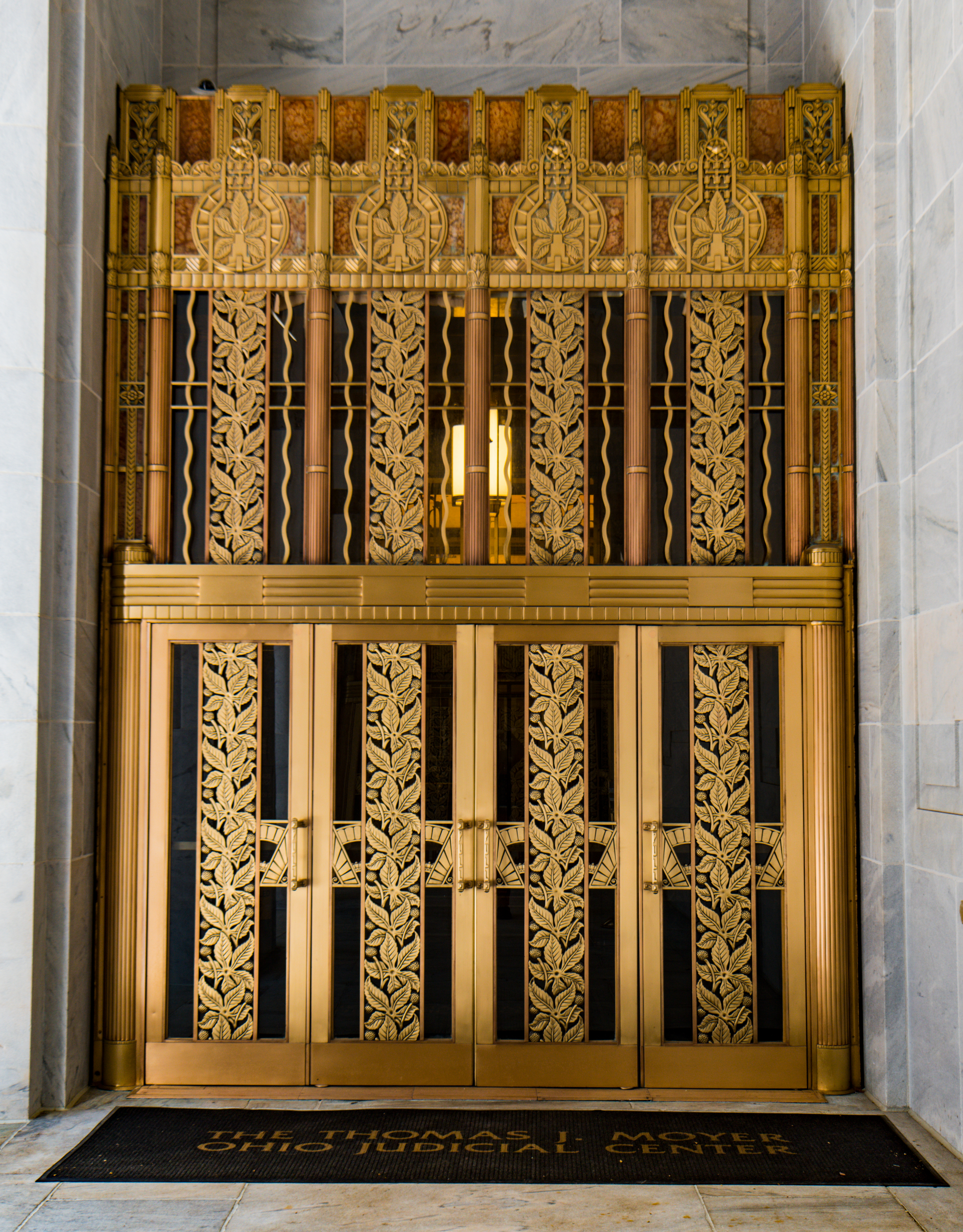
East doors

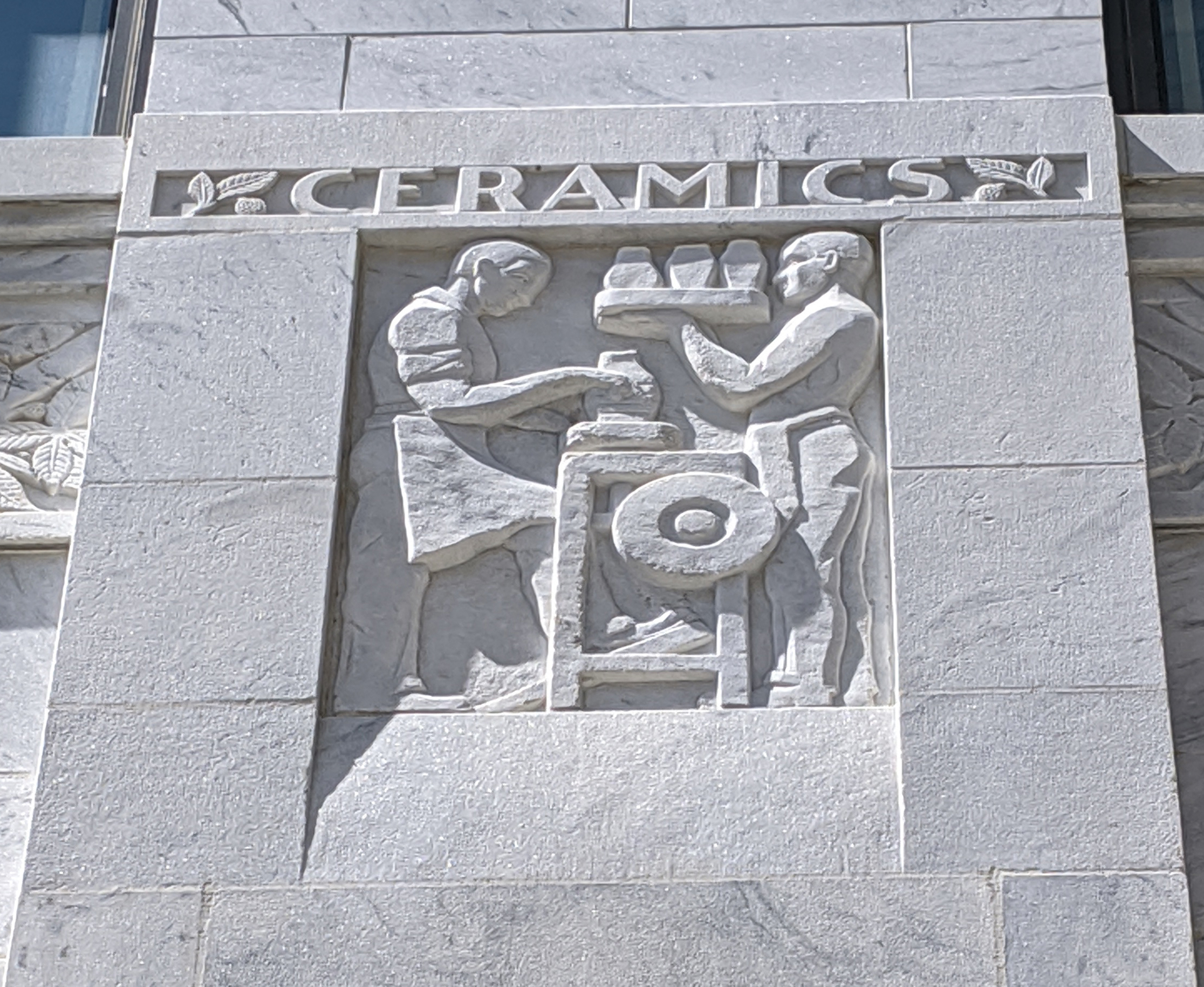
One of numerous industry murals

== See also ==
- National Register of Historic Places listings in Columbus, Ohio
