= Court of Claims =

The Court of Claims can refer to:

- Michigan Court of Claims
- New York Court of Claims
- Ohio Court of Claims
- Court of Claims (United Kingdom)
- Court of Claims (Ireland), a body established by the Act of Settlement 1662
- United States Court of Claims, a federal court which existed from 1855 to 1982
- United States Court of Federal Claims, an existing federal court established in 1982
