= Gavel (disambiguation) =

A Gavel is a small mallet used to conduct meetings

Gavel may also refer to:

== Surname ==
- Anton Gavel (born October 24, 1984), a basketball player
- Erica Gavel (born May 25, 1991), a Canadian wheelchair basketball player
- Tim Gavel, Australian sports broadcaster and journalist

== Other uses ==
- SS Empire Gavel, British name for a German merchantship captured by Britain in WWII and then given to Greece
- Gavel (sculpture) a 2008 sculpture by Andrew F. Scott
- Gavel Fell a hill in England's Lake District

== See also ==
- gravel
- Silver Gavel Award an award of the American Bar Association
