= Deborah A. Ashenhurst =

US National Guard general

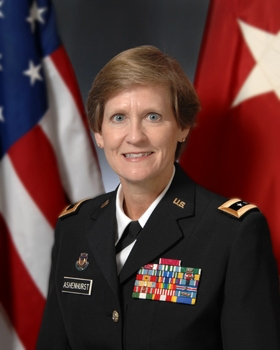
- Allegiance: United States
- Branch: United States Army; Army National Guard
- Service years: 1978–2015
- Rank: Major general
- Commands: Ohio National Guard
- Awards: See Awards & Decorations
- Other work: Director of Ohio Department of Veterans Services

Deborah A. Ashenhurst served in the Ohio National Guard for 37 years and now holds a position in the Cabinet of Governor Mike DeWine as the director of the Department Veterans Services. In January 2019, Ashenhurst was appointed as the first female director of the Ohio Department of Veteran Services, which supplies benefits and resources for Ohio's past service members.

== Personal life ==
Ashenhurst grew up in Springfield, Ohio, and Columbus, Ohio, and is now married to James Ashenhurst, who is a retired Army colonel.

== Career in National Guard ==
Ashenhurst first enlisted in the Ohio National Guard in 1978 and has served on 20 different assignments during her service. In 1980 she was commissioned as an Engineer Officer through the Ohio Army Guard's Officer Candidate School. She then served as a reconnaissance officer with the 54th support center. Ashenhurst commanded and held staff officer assignments from battalion, company, brigade, and Joint Force Headquarters. More recent assignments include the commanding general, 73rd Troop Command, commander, 237th personnel Services Battalion, and director, Property and Fiscal Operations, United States Property and Fiscal Office for Ohio. One of her more notable assignments was leading the 73rd Troop Command as a commander. This squad is one of two in the Homeland Response Force, which are trained to respond to any CBRNE incidents east of the Mississippi River. After leading the 73rd Troop Command she was appointed to the role of the first female Adjutant General by Governor John Kasich for the state of Ohio in 2011, and subsequently promoted to the rank of brigadier general. The move was approved by the 133rd General Assembly of the Ohio Legislature. In September 2012, General Ashenhurst was promoted to the rank of major general. After retiring from her role as adjutant general in 2015, General Ashenhurst took on a new position as special assistant to the vice chief in Washington D.C. for the National Guard Bureau. She served under Joseph L. Lengyel, who was the vice chief at the time.

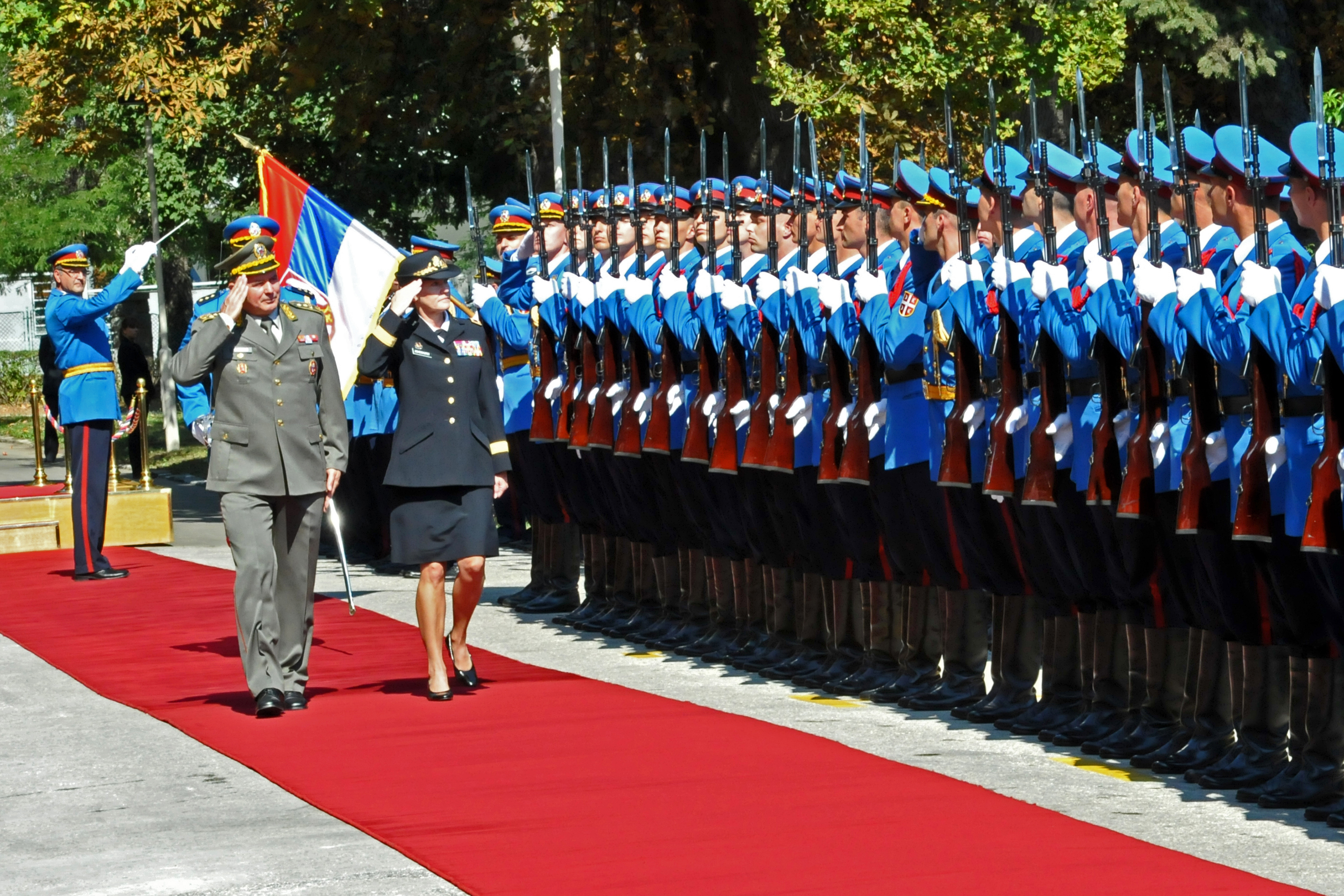
Deborah A. Ashenhurst in Serbia for coordinating activities between Ohio and Serbia.

Ashenhurst visited Serbia as part of the ongoing National Guard State Partnership Program promoting and coordinating activities between Serbia and Ohio. The United States is rated as one of the most successful cooperation programs of a total of 62 programs. There are 28 members of the ONG specialists with the members of the defense system and the Serbian Interior Ministry. Ashenhurst promoted the first generation of women officers in Serbia with her relations of being the first women to command the Ohio National Guard.

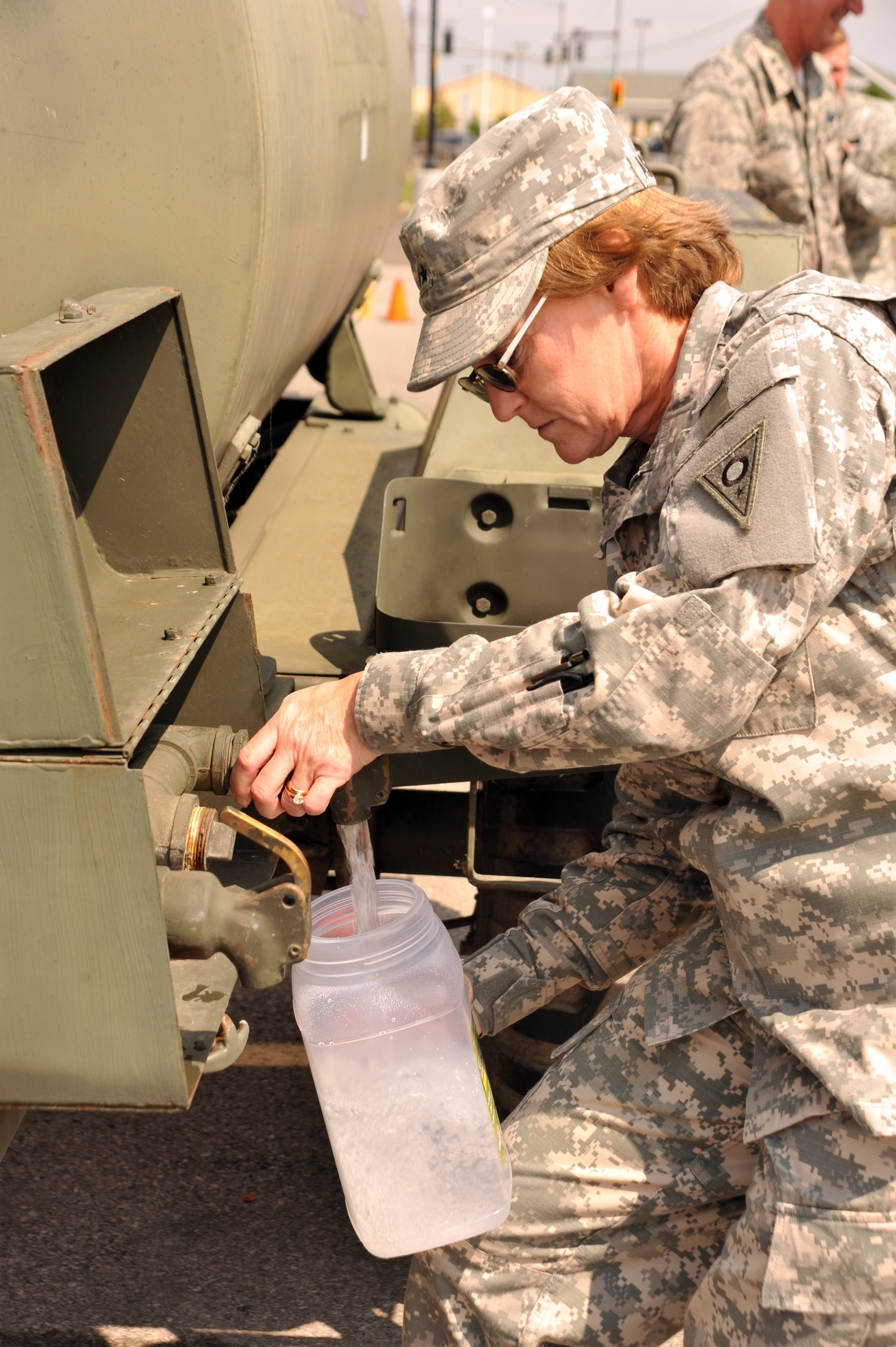
General Ashenhurst Pouring Water Jugs to Support Water Emergency in Holland, Ohio

== Education ==
In 1994, Ashenhurst received a Bachelor of Science degree with a concentration in sociology from Regents College (now Excelsior University), part of the University of the State of New York system. Her professional military education includes completion of the Engineer Officer Basic Course and Medical Officer Advanced Course. She also graduated from the Military Personnel Officer Course. Ashenhurst completed the Command and General Staff College program by distance learning. In 1995, she completed the Air War College course via distance learning, and in 1999 she completed the Army War College program, also by distance learning. She also graduated from the Adjutant General Corps Pre-Command Course and Joint Task Force Commander Training Course.

== Assignments ==
=== Promotions ===
Insignia	Rank	Date of rank
	Second Lieutenant	6 July 1980
	First Lieutenant	5 July 1983
	Captain	25 July 1985
	Major	24 August 1989
	Lieutenant Colonel	16 March 1995
	Colonel	20 October 2000
	Brigadier General	10 January 2011
	Major General	22 September 2012

=== Officer assigntments ===
Effective Dates of Service	Role	Unit
July 1980 – September 1981	Reconnaissance Officer	54th Support Center
September 1981 – December 1983	Inactive Reserve	US Army Reserve Control Group
December 1983 – August 1984	Instructor	Ohio Military Academy
August 1984 – December 1986	Adjutant	112th Medical Brigade
December 1986 – April 1989	Executive Officer	684th Medical Company
April 1989 – December 1989	Finance & Accounting Officer	Headquarters, State Regional Command
December 1989 – March 1990	Adjutant	112th Medical Brigade
March 1990 – December 1992	Commander	237th Forward Support Battalion
December 1992 – October 1994	Executive Officer	237th Forward Support Battalion
October 1994 – September 1997	Commander	237th Personnel Service Battalion
September 1997 – August 2000	Executive officer	73rd Troop Command
August 2000 – October 2003	Director of Installation Resources	Headquarters, State Regional Command
October 2003 – June 2004	Deputy Commander	73rd Troop Command
June 2004 – April 2005	Acting Commander	73rd Troop Command
April 2005 – June 2007	Deputy Commander	73rd Troop Command
June 2007 – June 2009	Director	J8
June 2009 – April 2010	Deputy Commander	73rd Troop Command
April 2010 – January 2011	Commander	73rd Troop Command
January 2011 – January 2015	Adjutant General	Ohio National Guard
January 2015 – January 2016	Special Assistant to the Vice Chief	National Guard Bureau

== Career in the private sector ==
Between her time serving in the United States National Guard and her career in public service, Ashenhurst worked at R2 Associates. She was the senior vice president of Military Strategy during her time there.

== Career in public service ==
On January 14, 2019, Ashenhurst was appointed as director of Ohio Department of Veterans Services by Governor Mike DeWine. As director she is responsible for leading the agency which provides benefits to Ohio veterans.

== Awards and decorations ==
U.S. military Decorations
	Distinguished Service Medal
Width-44 crimson ribbon with a pair of width-2 white stripes on the edges	Legion of Merit
	Meritorious Service Medal (with 1 Silver & 1 Bronze Oak Leaf Cluster)
	Joint Service Commendation Medal
Width-44 myrtle green ribbon with width-3 white stripes at the edges and five width-1 stripes down the center; the central white stripes are width-2 apart	Army Commendation Medal (with 2 Bronze Oak Leaf Clusters)
	Joint Service Achievement Medal
Width-44 ribbon with two width-9 ultramarine blue stripes surrounded by two pairs of two width-4 green stripes; all these stripes are separated by width-2 white borders	Army Achievement Medal
	Army Reserve Component Achievement Medal (with 1 Silver & 2 Bronze Oak Leaf Clusters)
	National Defense Service Medal (with 1 Bronze Service Star)
	Global War on Terrorism Service Medal
	Humanitarian Service Medal (with 1 Bronze Service Star)
	Armed Forces Reserve Medal (with 1 Gold Hourglass)
Width-44 ribbon with width-6 central ultramarine blue stripe, flanked by pairs of stripes that are respectively width-4 emerald, width-3 golden yellow, width-5 orange, and width-7 scarlet	Army Service Ribbon
	Reserve Components Overseas Training Ribbon (with Bronze Number 5)
National Guard awards
	Ohio Distinguished Service Medal (with 1 Bronze Oak Leaf Cluster)
	Ohio Commendation Medal
	Ohio Faithful Service Ribbon (with 3 Bronze Oak Leaf Clusters)
	Ohio Special Service Ribbon
	Ohio Basic Training Ribbon
	Mississippi Emergency Service Medal
