= Ohio Department of Veterans Services =

Department of Veterans Services
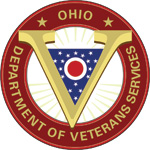
- Emblem

Department overview
- Formed: August 21, 2008
- Preceding department: Governor's Office of Veterans Affairs
- Jurisdiction: Ohio
- Headquarters: 77 South High Street, Columbus, Ohio, United States 43215 39.9605°N 83.0005°W
- Employees: 880 (2014)
- Annual budget: total $82.9 million US$ (2011)
- Department executive: Deborah Ashenhurst, Director
- Website: www.dvs.ohio.gov

The Ohio Department of Veterans Services (ODVS) is the administrative department of the Ohio state government responsible for identifying, connecting with, and advocating for veterans and their families. ODVS is headquartered in Columbus, Ohio. The Director of Veterans Services is part of the Governor's Cabinet.

== History ==
The Department grew out of the 1990s-era Governor’s Office of Veterans Affairs (GOVA). This organization, working with Ohio legislators, formulated basic changes to laws which began the process of standardizing the operations of the 88 CVSOs, entities which were created in the late 19th century to care for Civil War veterans.

In 2006, a study published by the Institute for Defense Analyses (IDA) provided a major impetus toward the department’s formation. The study said that Ohio was 50th in terms of the per capita dollar amount that veterans in the state received in compensation from the VA. Shortly after, Gov. Ted Strickland convened a study commission of veterans organizations that unanimously recommended the formation of the department.

In 2008, Ohio established the Department of Veterans Services with the passage of Senate Bill 289 in the 127th Ohio General Assembly, a bill sponsored by Sen. Robert Spada and passed with bipartisan support. The mission of the ODVS is to actively identify, connect with, and advocate for veterans and their families. Senate Bill 289 defined the mission and gave the department the responsibility to work directly with the county veterans service officers (CVSOs) and the U.S. Department of Veterans Affairs (VA), as well as with the various veterans service organizations and other concerned associations.

Former state legislator and Korean War-era veteran Bill Hartnett was named by Governor Strickland as the first Director of ODVS.

The department’s second Director was Colonel Thomas N. Moe (U.S. Air Force retired), appointed by Governor John Kasich in January 2011. Col. Moe was a Prisoner of War for more than five years during the Vietnam War. He earned 24 awards and decorations during his 30-year Air Force career, including two Silver Stars. He then became a public servant for the State of Ohio and Fairfield County, Ohio. He retired on July 22, 2013.

From July 23, 2013, to October 31, 2013, the department’s Assistant Director and Chief of Staff, Jason Dominguez, was appointed by Governor Kasich to serve as Interim Director. Mr. Dominguez is a Marine combat veteran of the Iraq War who served on the staff of U.S. Representative Pat Tiberi. He resumed his roles as Assistant Director and Chief of Staff upon the appointment of Director Gorrell.

On November 1, 2013, Timothy C. Gorrell (Colonel, U.S. Army retired) was sworn in by Governor Kasich as the department’s third Director. Mr. Gorrell served 31 years in the Army, retiring in 2012 following a final assignment as Command Inspector General for the Ohio National Guard. He also served in Bosnia and Kuwait. Prior to his current appointment, Mr. Gorrell was Deputy Inspector General for the State of Ohio.

== Responsibilities and programs ==
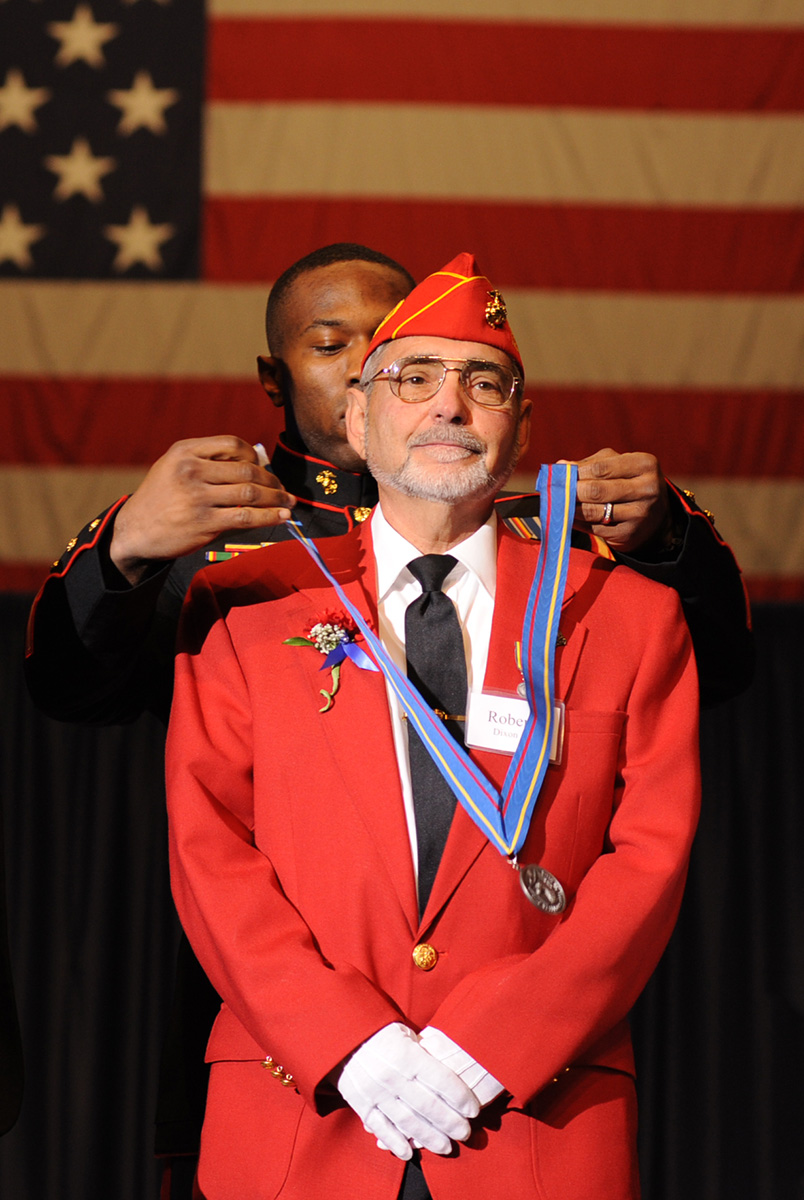
ODVS annually hosts the induction ceremony for the Ohio Veterans Hall of Fame. The Hall honors the contributions of veterans in service to community and their fellow citizens.

The Department has a wide range of responsibilities, including those defined in section 5902.02 of the Ohio Revised Code (ORC). ODVS advises the Governor on the state of veterans' affairs in Ohio and work as a liaison with other levels of government agencies. It has operational oversight of the 88 County Veterans Service Offices along with oversight of training, certification, and accreditation of more than 600 county veterans service officers, commissioners and staff. It monitors the federal money that comes into the State of Ohio from the U.S. Department of Veterans Affairs and works with the VA on program development, implementation and operations. It address the issues and concerns of more than 70 Veterans Service Organizations. It also keeps 2.1 million records of Ohio veterans who served in World War II, Korea, Vietnam, and OIF/OEF. It is the administrative agent of The Ohio Veterans Hall of Fame. It is the legislative agent for the Office of the Governor regarding any legislation relating to Ohio veterans and their needs.

=== Veterans Homes ===
When the department was created it assumed responsibility for the Ohio Veterans Homes (OVH). The homes provide direct nursing home care at facilities in Sandusky and Georgetown as well as domiciliary living to qualified veterans in Sandusky. The Sandusky home opened in 1888 to care for veterans of the American Civil War. The home in Georgetown is much newer, having been erected in 2003. There are a total of 767 beds maintained between the two homes.

=== Ohio Veterans Bonus ===
The Ohio Veterans Bonus awards bonuses to Ohio veterans of $100 a month to those veterans who served during the eligible periods in the Persian Gulf theater, or in the Iraq or Afghanistan theaters, up to a maximum of $1,000. For veterans who served in other parts of the world during these times, the payment is $50 a month up to a $500. Veterans medically discharged as a result of combat service can receive $1,000, regardless of how much time they spent in theater, plus up to $500 for months of service elsewhere. Family members of those killed in action or who died from disease as a result of their in-theater service can receive a bonus of $5,000 plus whatever the service member was eligible for, up to a total of $6,500. By the end of the fiscal year 2014, the program had paid over $65.6 million to more than 81,400 Ohio veterans and families.

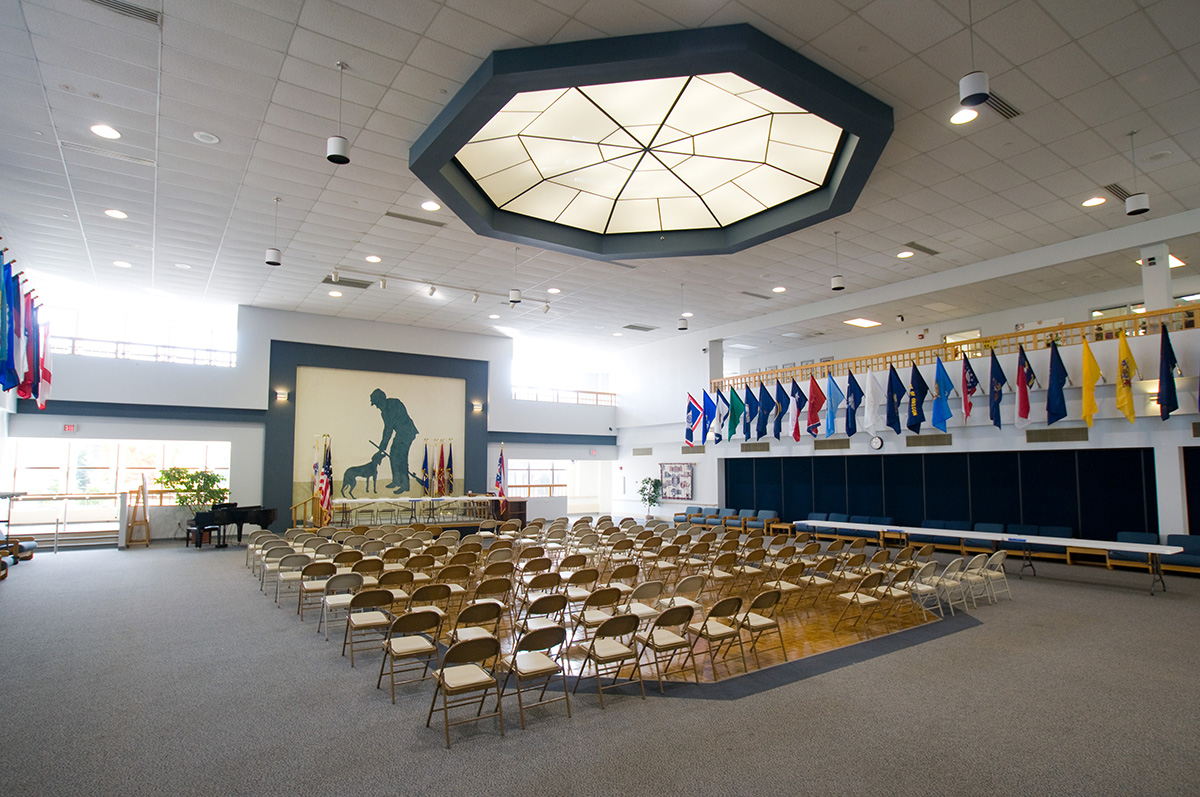
The Soldiers Hall is the central meeting place and program area inside the Ohio Veterans Home – Sandusky. This Home was founded in September 1888 as a place for Civil War veterans.

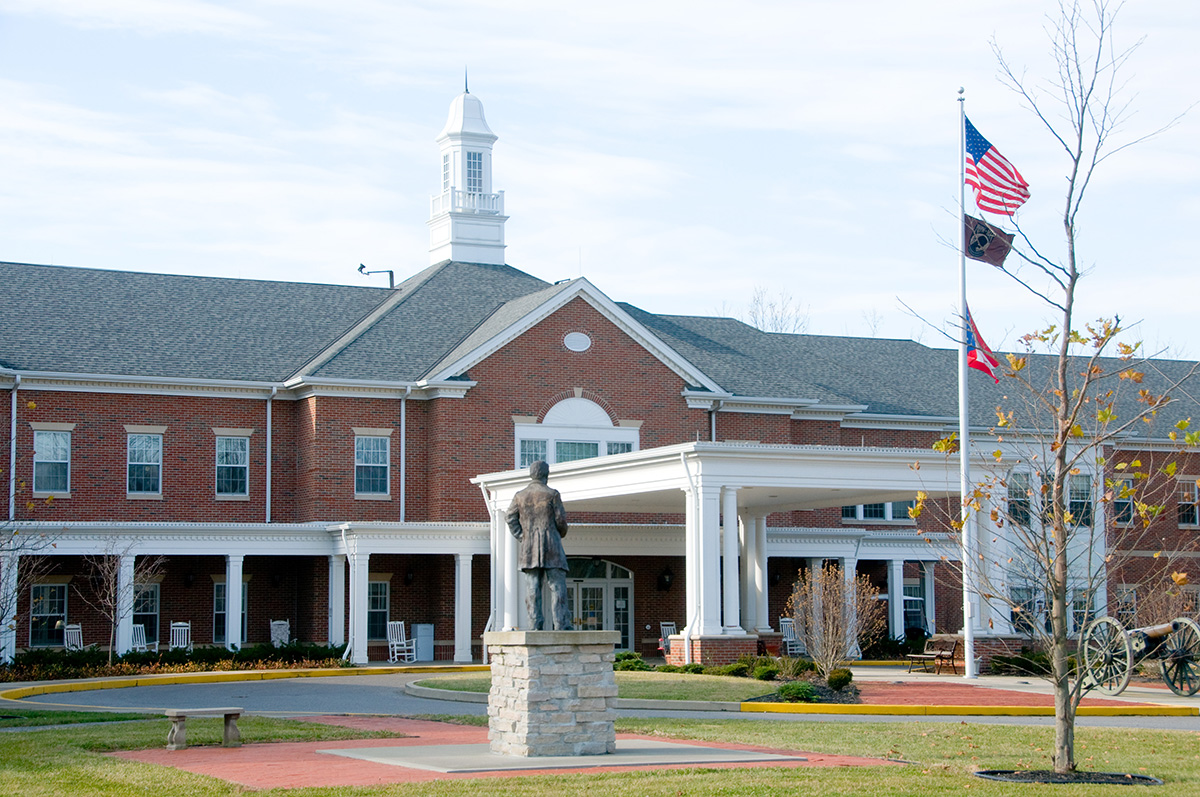
The Ohio Veterans Home – Georgetown, located near Cincinnati, opened in 2003. The two Homes maintain a total of 767 beds.

== See also ==
- United States Department of Veterans Affairs
