= Gavel (sculpture) =

Sculpture in Columbus, Ohio, U.S.

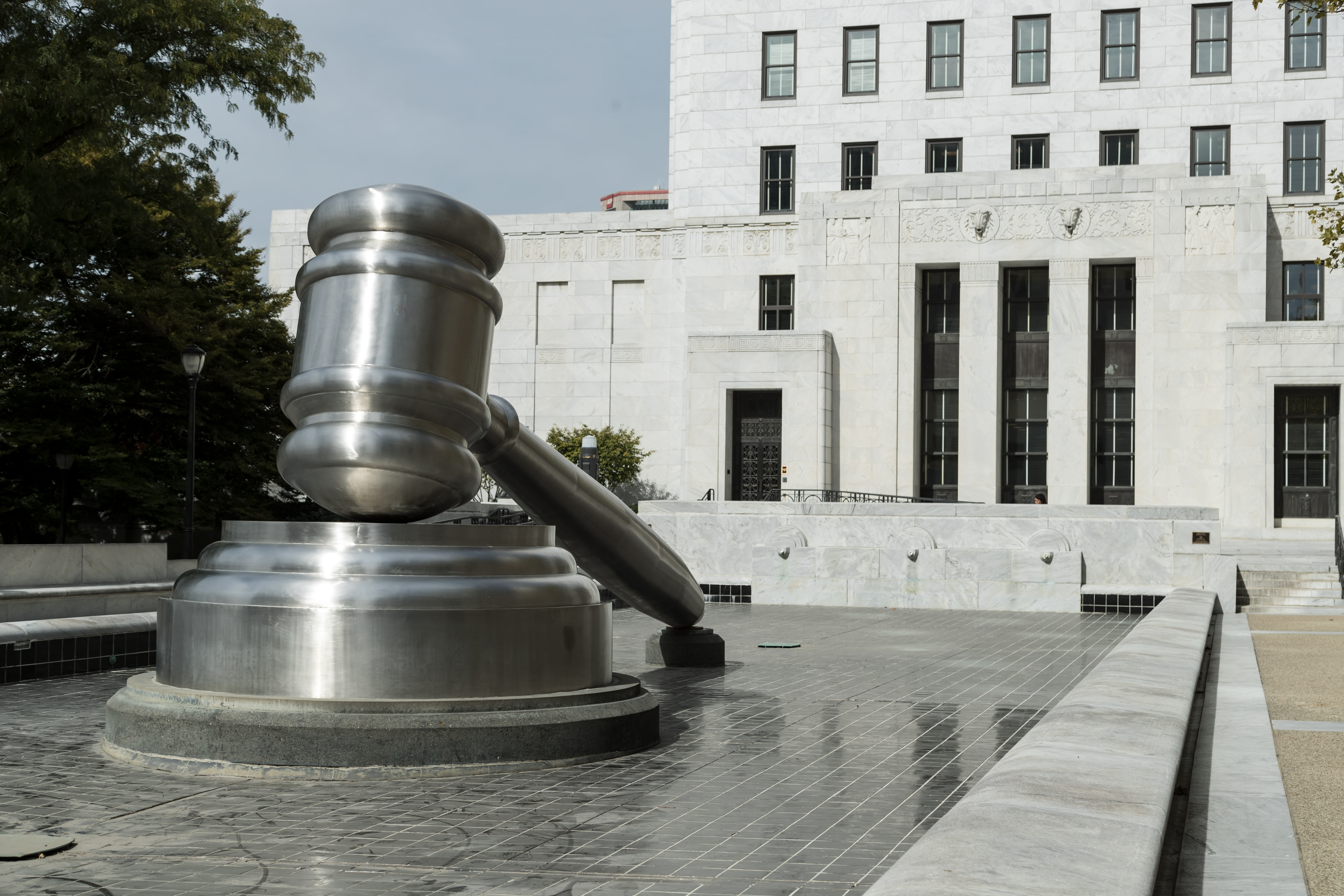
- Artist: Andrew F. Scott
- Year: 2008
- Medium: stainless steel
- Dimensions: 12 ft (3.7 m) × 15 ft (4.6 m) × 30 ft (9.1 m)
- Location: Columbus, Ohio, United States
- Coordinates: 39°57′34″N 83°00′08″W

Gavel is a 2008 sculpture by Andrew F. Scott, depicting a gavel, a mallet used by judges to maintain order in a courtroom and to punctuate rulings. The work is located at the Ohio Judicial Center, home to the Supreme Court of Ohio, situated in Downtown Columbus's Civic Center. The work was considered the largest gavel in the world upon its completion.

The sculpture was installed in the south reflecting pool of the judicial center in 2008. It depicts the authority that the judiciary has over decision-making. Both the sculpture and its counterpart in the north reflecting pool were funded by an Ohio State Bar Foundation grant. The sculptor is an Ohio State University graduate and professor of foundation studies at the Savannah College of Art & Design.

The sculpture is one of about 170 works of art at the Ohio Judicial Center. It is the largest and most expensive of those works, with a cost of $200,000.

== See also ==
- List of public art in Columbus, Ohio
