= Ohio Court of Claims =

Statewide court in Ohio

- Established: 1975
- Jurisdiction: Ohio, United States of America
- Location: Columbus, Ohio
- Composition method: Temporary Assignment by Chief Justice of the Supreme Court of Ohio
- Authorized by: Ohio Revised Code Chapter 2743
- Appeals to: Ohio Tenth District Court of Appeals

The Ohio Court of Claims is a court of limited, statewide jurisdiction. The court's jurisdiction extends to cases:

1. Against the State of Ohio, in which the state has waived sovereign immunity
2. Connected to suits against the State of Ohio where Plaintiffs are asking for equitable relief
3. Involving denial of access to public records by the State or any county, city, or agency.

The court also hears appeals from decisions made by the Ohio Attorney General on claims allowed under the Victims of Crime Act.

The judges of the Court of Claims sit by assignment by the Chief Justice of the Supreme Court of Ohio. Currently, the assigned judges and magistrates are:

- Judge Lisa Sadler
- Judge David Cain
- Magistrate Holly T. Shaver
- Magistrate Robert Van Schoyck
- Magistrate Gary W. Peterson
- Magistrate Adam Morris
- Magistrate Amber Damiani

A Special Master hears claims for violations of access to public records. Todd Marti serves as the court's Special Master.

Appeals from the Court of Claims are heard by the Tenth District Court of Appeals in Columbus.

The court is located in the Thomas J. Moyer Ohio Judicial Center in Columbus.

The clerk of the court is Anderson Renick.

== History ==
The Ohio Court of Claims was created in 1975 by the passage of the Court of Claims Act. The Court was created to replace the Sundry Claims Board which existed from 1917 through 1975. The Board was considered inadequate for hearing claims against the state for a number of reasons, including that the Attorney General both sat on the Board and had the job of representing the State of Ohio before the Board.
