= Ohio Department of Insurance =

Department of Insurance
Department overview
- Formed: March 12, 1872
- Jurisdiction: Ohio
- Department executive: Judith L. French, director
- Website: insurance.ohio.gov

The Ohio Department of Insurance (ODI) is an Ohio state government administrative agency. The ODI provides consumer protection through education and regulation while promoting a stable and competitive environment for insurance companies.

== History ==
The Ohio Department of Insurance was established on March 12, 1872. It was created under the authority of section 121.02 of the Ohio Revised Code (ORC) and is administered by the Director of Insurance. Insurance companies operating in the state of Ohio are subject to regulation under Title 39; and depending upon the entity of the organization, Chapters 1751 and 1753 of the ORC. ODI is charge with seeing that the laws are executed and enforced. Title 39 also provides for the rehabilitation or liquidation of financially troubled insurers. The Office of Liquidation is charged with administering this law.

== Responsibilities ==
The department is charged under Ohio Revised Code Chapters 17 and 39 with the responsibility of regulating the activities of 1,675 insurance companies – nearly 260 of them based in Ohio – that write more than $102 billion in premiums. The department also monitors the conduct of approximately 252,640 insurance agents and 19,220 insurance agencies doing business in Ohio.

In addition, the department examines the financial soundness of insurance companies, as well as investigates consumer complaints and insurance fraud. The department also determines if services and benefits offered by companies are consistent with insurance policy provisions and Ohio law, reviews and approves more than 6,200 company filings per year for life, accident, health, managed care, and property and casualty policy forms and rates. The Director of Insurance, who is appointed by the Governor, heads the department, which employs approximately 248 full-time permanent staff.
