= Ohio Department of Administrative Services =

Department of Administrative Services
Department overview
- Jurisdiction: Ohio
- Department executive: Kathleen Madden, Director
- Website: das.ohio.gov

The Ohio Department of Administrative Services (DAS) is the administrative department of the Ohio state government responsible for such disparate matters as personnel, government procurement, public printing, and facilities, telecommunications and fleet management.
