= Ohio Department of Agriculture =

Agriculture department of the U.S. state of Ohio

Department of Agriculture
- Seal of the Ohio Department of Agriculture

Department overview
- Formed: February 28, 1846; 180 years ago
- Jurisdiction: The state of Ohio
- Headquarters: 8995 East Main Street, Reynoldsburg, Ohio, United States 43068
- Department executive: Brian Baldridge, Director
- Website: agri.ohio.gov

The Ohio Department of Agriculture (ODA) is the administrative department of the Ohio state government responsible for ensuring the safety of the food supply, to maintain the health of animals and plant life, to create economic opportunities for farmers, food processors and agribusinesses, and to inspect amusement park rides in the state of Ohio.

== History ==
The history of the department dates to 1846, when it was founded as the Ohio Board of Agriculture. In 1913 the General Assembly created an Agricultural Commission to assume the responsibilities of the Board of Agriculture, State Agricultural Experiment Station, Dairy and Food Commissioner, Commissioners of Fish and Game, and State Board of Veterinary Examiners, as well as some functions of the State Board of Pharmacy. The agency reverted to the name Board of Agriculture in 1915, and maintained bureaux for Dairy and Food Inspection, Fair Administration, Feed and Fertilizers, Fish and Game, Horticulture, Livestock Industry and Markets and Agriculture Statistics. In 1921, it was internally reorganized into five divisions - Animal Industry, Fish and Game, Foods and Dairies, Plant Industry and State Fair.

Already rumoured in 2008 and initiated in 2009, the ODA was sued by the International Dairy Foods Association, which "is a trade organization whose collective membership consists of an estimated 85 percent of the milk, cultured-products, cheese, and frozen-desserts producers in the United States" to overturn a "regulation designed to curb the allegedly misleading labeling of dairy products" which were produced by cows injected with "genetically engineered hormone called recombinant bovine somatotropin (rBST), also known as recombinant bovine growth hormone (rBGH)." The head of the ODA at the time was Robert Boggs. The ODA finally in September 2010 lost the case in the Sixth Circuit Court of Appeals and the "allegedly misleading labeling" was allowed to continue unabated. A professor in the Department of Nutrition, Food Studies, and Public Health at New York University named Marion Nestle wrote in The Atlantic with questions about Ohio's will to regulate and whether it planned to settle the matter in the United States Supreme Court.

== Partnerships and stakeholders ==
The department collaborates with producer organizations such as the Ohio Corn & Wheat Growers Association to support the state's corn and wheat industries through advocacy, education, and economic initiatives.
