= Ohio Department of Taxation =

Taxation department of the U.S. state of Ohio

Department of Taxation
- Seal of the Ohio Department of Taxation

Department overview
- Formed: 1939; 87 years ago
- Jurisdiction: The state of Ohio
- Headquarters: 4485 Northland Ridge Boulevard, Columbus, Ohio, United States 43229
- Department executive: Patricia Harris, Director
- Website: tax.ohio.gov

The Ohio Department of Taxation is the administrative department of the Ohio state government responsible for collection and administration of most state taxes, several local taxes and the oversight of real property taxation.
