= Ohio Department of Health =

Government agency in Ohio

Department of Health
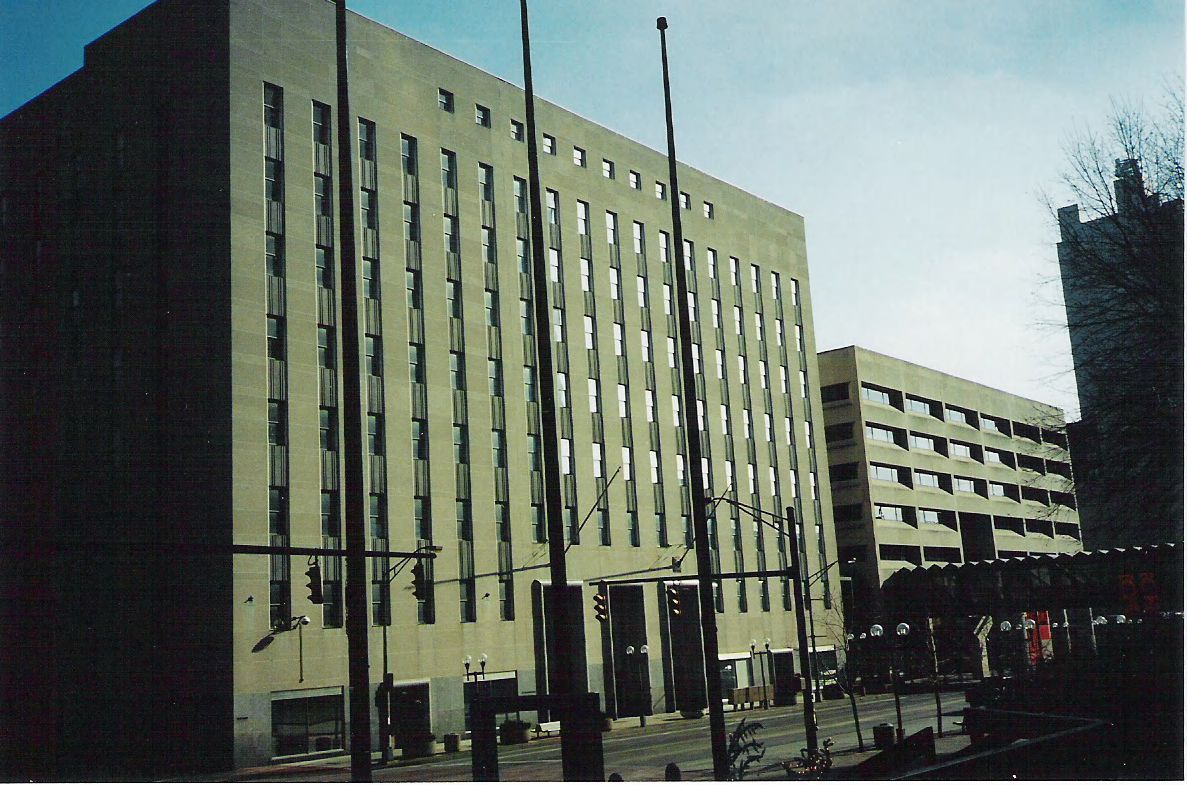
- Ohio Department of Health building in Columbus, Ohio

Department overview
- Jurisdiction: Ohio
- Department executive: Bruce Vanderhoff, director of health
- Website: odh.ohio.gov

The Ohio Department of Health (ODH) is the administrative department of the Ohio state government responsible for coordinating activities for child and family health services, children with medical handicaps, early intervention services, nutrition services, and community health services. It ensures the quality of public health and health care delivery systems, evaluates health status, prevents and controls injuries and diseases (chronic and infectious), and promotes good health.

During the COVID-19 pandemic, ODH spent over $70 million running community-based diagnostic testing, operating a public call center, and distributing personal protective equipment.
