= Ohio Department of Commerce =

Department of Commerce
Department overview
- Jurisdiction: Ohio
- Department executive: Sheryl Maxfield, Director
- Website: com.ohio.gov

The Ohio Department of Commerce is the administrative department of the Ohio state government responsible for regulating banks and savings institutions, credit unions, mortgage brokers/lenders and consumer finance businesses; securities professionals and products; real estate professionals and cable television; and the building industry; and also collects and holds unclaimed funds. The Division of Liquor Control and Division of the State Fire Marshal are also part of the department.
