= Timothy J. Kelly =

American federal judge (born 1969)

Tim Kelly
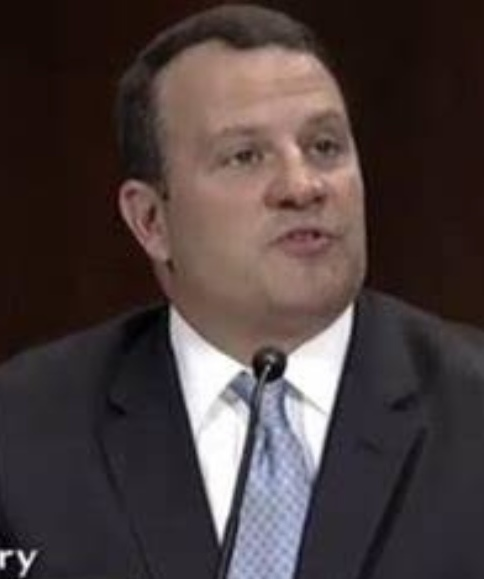

Judge of the United States District Court for the District of Columbia
- Incumbent
- Assumed office September 8, 2017
- Appointed by: Donald Trump
- Preceded by: Rosemary M. Collyer

Personal details
- Born: Timothy James Kelly; 1969 (age 56–57) Glen Cove, New York, U.S.
- Education: Duke University (AB); Georgetown University (JD)

Timothy James Kelly (born 1969) is an American lawyer and jurist serving as a U.S. district judge of the United States District Court for the District of Columbia. He was appointed in 2017 by President Donald Trump. Kelly was previously chief counsel for national security and senior crime counsel to the Senate Judiciary Committee.

== Biography ==
Kelly received his Bachelor of Arts, cum laude, from Duke University in 1991. From 1991 to 1993, he was a legal assistant at the law firm Cleary Gottlieb Steen & Hamilton, and from 1993 to 1994 he was a waiter at a restaurant in Washington, DC. He then attended Georgetown University Law Center, where he was a senior associate editor of the American Criminal Law Review. He graduated in 1997 with a Juris Doctor.

After law school, Kelly entered private practice at Arnold & Porter. He served as a law clerk to Judge Ronald L. Buckwalter of the U.S. District Court for the Eastern District of Pennsylvania from 2001 to 2002, returning to Arnold & Porter afterward. Kelly worked for the U.S. Department of Justice from 2003 to 2013. He served first as an Assistant United States Attorney in the District of Columbia and then as a trial attorney in the Public Integrity Section of the Department of Justice's Criminal Division. He also served as the Republican staff director for the Senate's Caucus on International Narcotics Control, and from 2013 to 2017 Judge Kelly served as Chief Counsel for National Security and Senior Crime Counsel to U.S. Senate Judiciary Committee Chairman Charles E. Grassley.

=== Federal judicial service ===
On June 7, 2017, President Donald Trump nominated Kelly to serve as a United States District Judge of the United States District Court for the District of Columbia, to the seat vacated by Judge Rosemary M. Collyer, who assumed senior status on May 18, 2016. A hearing on his nomination before the Senate Judiciary Committee took place on June 28, 2017. On July 13, 2017, his nomination was reported out of committee by a voice vote. On September 5, 2017, the United States Senate confirmed his nomination by a 94–2 vote. He received his judicial commission on September 8, 2017.

=== Notable cases ===
Kelly presided over English v. Trump, a lawsuit related to the Federal Vacancies Reform Act and the successor to the Director of the Consumer Financial Protection Bureau, Richard Cordray, who had resigned in November 2017 to kick off a run for Governor of Ohio. Before resigning, Cordray appointed Leandra English as his deputy. President Trump appointed Mick Mulvaney, the Director of the Office of Management and Budget, to serve as acting director. Kelly declined to issue a temporary restraining order and held that Mulvaney could remain as acting director.

Kelly presided over CNN v. Trump, a lawsuit about President Trump's decision to revoke Jim Acosta's White House press credentials, denying him access to the White House grounds. CNN filed a lawsuit in order to challenge this decision and alleged this violated Acosta's first and fifth amendment rights. On November 16, 2018, Kelly ruled that Acosta could return to the White House, pending a trial. On November 19, 2018, CNN dropped the suit as it became moot after the White House agreed to restoring Acosta's press credentials.

On December 28, 2021, Kelly refused to dismiss an indictment against four members of the Proud Boys who were charged with conspiracy in the 2021 United States Capitol attack. On May 4, 2023, four of the five defendants in that case, Enrique Tarrio, Joseph Biggs, Ethan Nordean and Zachary Rehl, were convicted of seditious conspiracy and conspiracy to obstruct an official proceeding, while the other defendant, Dominic Pezzola, was acquitted of seditious conspiracy. Kelly declared a mistrial for Pezzola's obstruction count as the jury deadlocked on the charge. In July 2026, Kelly dismissed the case against Nordean, Biggs, Rehl and Pezzola under protest, saying he was obliged by precedent to grant the Justice Department's motion to dismiss.

On September 23, 2026, Kelly heard a lawsuit between CNN, MS NOW, and Politico and President Trump after his administration revoked the trio's White House press credentials. Kelly issued a temporary restraining order restoring the media outlets access citing their likelihood to succeed on the merits of their case, specifically around the lack of due process.

== Memberships ==
He has been a member of the Federalist Society since 2009.

== Personal life ==
Kelly lives in Washington, D.C., with his wife and two children.

Legal offices
Preceded by Rosemary M. Collyer	Judge of the United States District Court for the District of Columbia; 2017–present	Incumbent
