= English v. Trump =

United States District Court case

- Court: United States District Court for the District of Columbia
- Full case name: Leandra English, Deputy Director and Acting Director, Consumer Financial Protection Bureau v. Donald J. Trump, in his official capacity as President of the United States of America and John Michael Mulvaney, in his capacity as the person claiming to be the acting director of the Consumer Financial Protection Bureau
- Decided: Voluntarily dismissed on July 18, 2018
- Defendants: Donald Trump; Mick Mulvaney
- Plaintiff: Leandra English
- Citation: No. 1:17-cv-02534

Court membership
- Judge sitting: Timothy J. Kelly

Leandra English v. Donald Trump, et al., No. 1:17-cv-02534 (D.D.C. 2017), was a lawsuit before the United States District Court for the District of Columbia. The plaintiff, Leandra English, alleged that the defendants, Donald Trump and Mick Mulvaney, violated 12 U.S.C. § 5491(b)(5)(B), a component of the Dodd–Frank Act of 2010, when President Trump appointed Mulvaney to be Acting Director of the Consumer Financial Protection Bureau (CFPB).

English filed her lawsuit shortly after outgoing director Richard Cordray resigned, and she sought a temporary restraining order and a preliminary injunction to prevent Mulvaney from becoming the Acting Director of the CFPB. In July 2018, English resigned from the CFPB and voluntarily dismissed her lawsuit after Trump nominated Kathy Kraninger to be the next Director.

== Chronology ==
On November 24, 2017, English was appointed Deputy Director of the CFPB by outgoing Director Richard Cordray, and according to Cordray that would make English the Acting Director after his resignation. That same evening, President Donald Trump appointed the Director of the Office of Management and Budget (OMB), Mick Mulvaney, as the Acting Director of the CFPB.

On November 28, Judge Timothy J. Kelly denied the plaintiff's request for an emergency temporary restraining order. On December 6, 2017, English responded by filing a request seeking a preliminary injunction to install her as the CFPB's acting chief in place of Mulvaney. Judge Kelly heard arguments on the preliminary injunction on December 22. On January 11, 2018, Judge Kelly denied the injunction, affirming Mulvaney as Acting Director.

Two days later, on January 12, English appealed to the U.S. Court of Appeals for the District of Columbia Circuit.

On January 22, a panel of the D.C. Circuit agreed to expedite the appeal. An oral argument is scheduled for April 12. On January 31, the D.C. appeals court established in another case, PHH v. CFPB, that the law establishing the CFPB can bar the President from firing the CFPB director.

In June 2018, President Trump nominated Kathy Kraninger, an OMB official, to be the next CFPB Director. In response to this nomination, English stepped down from the CFPB and voluntarily dismissed her lawsuit on July 18, 2018.

== Legal background ==
The case attracted various amicus curiae briefs, including one signed by Barney Frank and Elizabeth Warren, the legal architects of the agency, urging the court to side with the plaintiff. Another amici brief which supported the defendants was filed by the attorneys general of Texas, Alabama, and Georgia, among others.

The general argument against the president's nomination is that the Dodd-Frank Act contains mandatory language that makes the deputy director the acting director in the event of a resignation until the Senate confirms the president's choice of director, in order to make the agency more independent. By this reasoning, it would be mandatory to follow the order of succession or nomination provided by the Dodd-Frank Act for the agency, even if the background law might otherwise allow a different result.

The argument for the president's nomination is based on opinions from the Office of Legal Counsel and CFPB's General Counsel that the Federal Vacancies Reform Act provides an option for appointing a successor even when another, more specific, option exists in another statute (in this case, the Dodd–Frank Act).

The Federal Vacancies Reform Act allows the president to appoint an interim replacement for certain offices without Senate confirmation, but states that it does not provide the “exclusive means” for filling a vacancy when “a statutory provision...designates an officer or employee to perform the functions and duties of a specified office temporarily in an acting capacity.” The law establishing the CFPB (the Dodd–Frank Act) doesn't specify whether the director's resignation qualifies as "unavailability" under FVRA, leading to claims that the general provisions of FVRA should prevail. The Office of Legal Counsel has stated that the FVRA provides a means for naming an acting CFPB Director, but it isn't the exclusive means for doing so, since the act establishing the CFPB has additional provisions. The CFPB's General Counsel issued a memo agreeing with this opinion.

A related argument, from the PHH v. CFPB case, is that the president's power over the agency is necessary to ensure its accountability.

== See also ==
- List of lawsuits involving Donald Trump
