= 2010 Ohio Attorney General election =

- November 2, 2010
- Turnout: 46.3% ▼
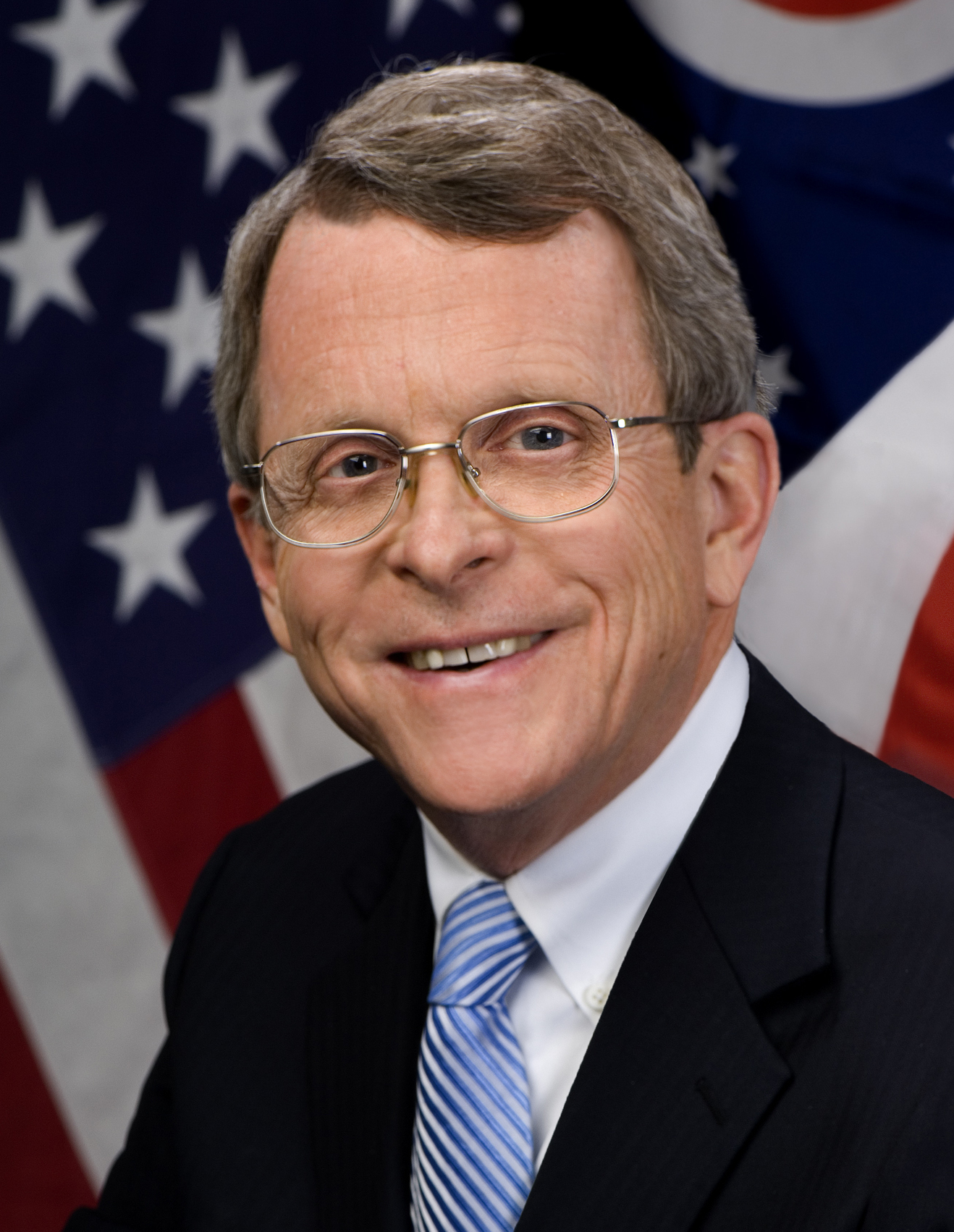

Nominee	Mike DeWine	Richard Cordray
Party	Republican	Democratic
Popular vote	1,821,414	1,772,728
Percentage	47.54%	46.26%
- DeWine: 40–50% 50–60% 60–70% Cordray: 40-50% 50–60% 60–70% 70–80%
Attorney General before election
Richard Cordray
Democratic
Elected Attorney General
Mike DeWine
Republican

The 2010 Ohio Attorney General election was held on November 2, 2010, concurrently with other statewide offices including a Class 1 Senate election as well as the Governor election. Incumbent Democratic Attorney General Richard Cordray was first elected in a 2008 special election, and ran for a full 4-year term, losing to Republican challenger and former 2-term U.S. senator Mike DeWine. Being decided by 1.2%, this was the closest statewide election in Ohio. DeWine was later elected Governor of Ohio in 2018 in a rematch with Cordray.

== Background ==
In 2008, then Ohio State Treasurer Richard Cordray ascended to the office of Attorney General following his victory in a 2008 special election triggered by the resignation of Marc Dann. Cordray won his election in a landslide winning by 18 percentage points, being held concurrently with the presidential election when Barack Obama carried the state by a bit under 5 percentage points. During Cordray's tenure, he got involved in cases against the Bank of America Corporation as well as the American International Group.

In 2009, former United States Senator Mike DeWine announced he would seek the office of Attorney General, 3 years after Sherrod Brown defeated him in the 2006 election. Due to the growing unpopularity of the Obama administration, many political observers predicted 2010 would be a tough year for Democrats. As such, polling predicted that DeWine had a narrow edge over Cordray.

== Democratic primary ==
=== Candidates ===
==== Declared ====
- Richard Cordray, incumbent Attorney General, former Ohio State Treasurer, former Ohio House of Representatives member from the 33rd district, former Treasurer of Franklin County, former Solicitor General of Ohio, nominee for OH-15 in 1992, nominee for Attorney General in 1998, and candidate for U.S. Senate in 2000.

=== Results ===
Democratic primary
Party	Candidate	Votes	%
Democratic	Richard Cordray (Incumbent)	558,810	100.00%
Total votes		558,810	100.00%

== Republican primary ==
=== Candidates ===
==== Declared ====
- Mike DeWine, former U.S. Senator, former lieutenant governor of Ohio, and former U.S. Representative.

=== Results ===
Republican primary
Party	Candidate	Votes	%
Republican	Mike DeWine	687,507	100.00%
Total votes		687,507	100.00%

== General election ==
=== Polling ===
Poll source	Dates administered	Richard Cordray (D)	Mike DeWine (R)
Survey USA	September 10–13, 2010	40%	47%
The Columbus Dispatch	August 25 – September 3, 2010	42%	44%
Public Policy Polling	August 27–29, 2010	40%	44%
Public Policy Polling	June 26–27, 2010	41%	44%

=== Endorsements ===
Richard Cordray

Newspapers

- The Cincinnati Enquirer
- Columbus Dispatch
- Cleveland Plain Dealer

Organizations

- Buckeye Firearms Association
- Canton Police Patrolman's Association
- Cleveland Police Patrolmen's Association
- Toledo Police Command Officers Association
- Toledo Police Patrolmen's Association
- Troopers for a Safer Ohio
- Ohio Patrolmen's Benevolent Association
- NARAL Pro-Choice Ohio

Unions

- Ohio AFL–CIO
- Communications Workers of America
Mike DeWine

Organizations

- Ohio Right to Life
- Ohio Veterans United

=== Results ===
In the end, DeWine defeated Cordary by exactly 1.28 percentage points. Cordray held his own in his home county of Franklin and various other suburbs but, his loss can be mainly attributed to his loss of ground in Appalachian Ohio as well as the overwhelmingly Republican national environment. DeWine similarly did well in his home county of Greene and narrowly carried the ancestrally Republican Hamilton County.

2010 Ohio Attorney General election
Party	Candidate	Votes	%	±%
Republican	Mike DeWine	1,821,414	47.54	+9.13%
Democratic	Richard Cordray (incumbent)	1,772,728	46.26	−10.46%
Constitution	Robert Owens	130,065	3.39	N/A
Libertarian	Marc Allan Feldman	107,521	2.81	N/A
Total votes		3,729,428	100.00	N/A
Republican gain from Democratic				
