= Mick Mulvaney =

American politician (born 1967)

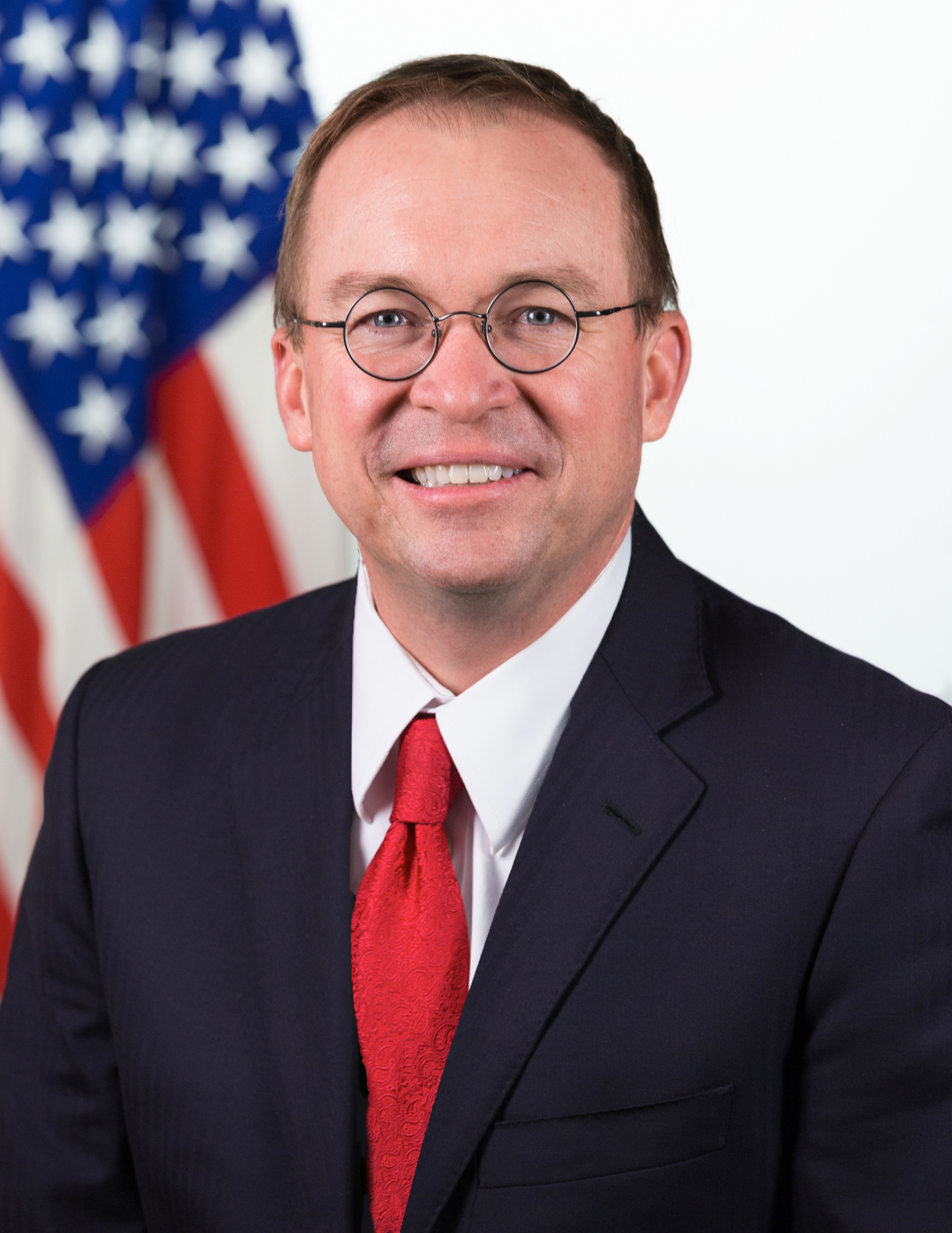
- Official portrait, 2017

United States Special Envoy for Northern Ireland
- In office May 1, 2020 – January 6, 2021
- President: Donald Trump
- Preceded by: Gary Hart
- Succeeded by: Joe Kennedy III

White House Chief of Staff
- Acting
- In office January 2, 2019 – March 31, 2020
- President: Donald Trump
- Preceded by: John F. Kelly
- Succeeded by: Mark Meadows

Director of the Office of Management and Budget
- In office February 16, 2017 – March 31, 2020; On leave: January 2, 2019 – March 31, 2020 (Note: Russell Vought served as acting OMB director during Mulvaney's tenure as acting White House chief of staff.)
- President: Donald Trump
- Deputy: Russell Vought
- Preceded by: Shaun Donovan
- Succeeded by: Russell Vought
Other administration positions
Director of the Consumer Financial Protection Bureau
Acting
In office November 25, 2017 – December 11, 2018
President	Donald Trump
Deputy	Leandra English; Brian Johnson (acting)
Preceded by	Leandra English (acting)
Succeeded by	Kathy Kraninger

Member of the U.S. House of Representatives from South Carolina's 5th district
- In office January 3, 2011 – February 16, 2017
- Preceded by: John Spratt
- Succeeded by: Ralph Norman

Member of the South Carolina Senate from the 16th district
- In office January 3, 2009 – January 3, 2011
- Preceded by: Chauncey K. Gregory
- Succeeded by: Chauncey K. Gregory

Member of the South Carolina House of Representatives from the 45th district
- In office January 3, 2007 – January 3, 2009
- Preceded by: Eldridge Emory
- Succeeded by: Deborah Long

Personal details
- Born: John Michael Mulvaney; July 21, 1967 (age 59) Alexandria, Virginia, U.S.
- Party: Republican
- Spouse: Pamela West (m. 1998)
- Children: 3
- Education: Georgetown University (BS); University of North Carolina, Chapel Hill (JD)

John Michael "Mick" Mulvaney (born July 21, 1967) is an American politician who served as director of the Office of Management and Budget from 2017 to 2020 and as acting White House chief of staff from 2019 to 2020. Prior to his appointments to the Trump administration, he served in the U.S. House of Representatives and the South Carolina General Assembly.

Mulvaney, a Republican, served in the South Carolina House of Representatives from 2007 to 2009 and then the South Carolina Senate from 2009 to 2011. He served as a U.S. representative for South Carolina's fifth congressional district from 2011 to 2017. He was nominated as OMB director by President-elect Donald Trump in December 2016 and confirmed by Senate vote (51–49) on February 16, 2017. While confirmed as OMB director, he served as acting director of the Consumer Financial Protection Bureau (CFPB) from November 2017 to December 2018 and as acting White House chief of staff from January 2019 until March 2020. After resigning as OMB director and acting White House chief of staff, he served as the U.S. special envoy for Northern Ireland from March 2020 until January 2021.

Mulvaney was known for his support for fiscal conservatism as a congressman, which included a willingness to shut down the government during Barack Obama's presidency. However, as OMB director in the Trump administration, he oversaw an expansion in the deficit. The deficit increases were a result of both spending increases and tax cuts, and were unusually high for a period of economic expansion. A staunch opponent of the CFPB while in Congress, Mulvaney's tenure as acting director of the bureau led to a considerable reduction of the bureau's enforcement and regulatory powers.

In January 2019, Mulvaney became acting White House chief of staff. In a White House press conference held on October 17, 2019, Mulvaney said the White House had withheld military aid in part until Ukraine investigated an unsubstantiated theory that Ukraine, not Russia, was responsible for hacking Democratic Party emails in 2016. Mark Meadows succeeded Mulvaney as chief of staff.

On January 7, 2021, Mulvaney reported that he had resigned the day before as special envoy for Northern Ireland following the storming of the U.S. Capitol. In 2022, he was hired as an on-air contributor for CBS News. His hiring stirred controversy within the company due to his history of promoting Trump's false claims and attacking the press. He has since joined NewsNation and CNBC as a contributor.

== Early life and education ==
Mulvaney was born in Alexandria, Virginia, to Mike, a real estate developer, and Kathy Mulvaney, a teacher. He grew up in Charlotte, North Carolina. He later moved to Indian Land, South Carolina. He has Polish and Irish ancestry, with roots in County Mayo, Ireland. He attended Charlotte Catholic High School and then Georgetown University, where he majored in international economics, commerce and finance. At Georgetown, he was an Honors Scholar of the Walsh School of Foreign Service, and ultimately graduated with honors in 1989.

Mulvaney attended law school at the University of North Carolina at Chapel Hill. He earned a full scholarship to attend law school, where his focus was on antitrust law. He earned a Juris Doctor in 1992.

== Early career ==
From 1992 to 1997, Mulvaney practiced law with the firm James, McElroy and Diehl. Mulvaney joined his family's homebuilding and real estate business. He participated in the Owners and Presidents Management Program at Harvard Business School. He was a minority shareholder and owner-operator in Salsarita's Fresh Cantina, a privately held regional restaurant chain.

=== South Carolina legislature ===
==== State House ====
Mulvaney was elected to the South Carolina House of Representatives in 2006.

==== State Senate ====
In 2008 an unexpected retirement created a vacancy in the South Carolina Senate. While in the State Senate, Mulvaney served on the Judiciary, Labor/Commerce/Industry, Medical Affairs, Agriculture/Natural Resources, and Corrections Committees. The Palmetto Family Council identified him as the Freshman Legislator of the Year in 2006 for his work on the Woman's Ultrasound Right to Know Act, which required physicians to perform ultrasounds on pregnant women seeking abortions and inform them of the fetus' gestational age before performing the procedure.

In 2010 he was named Legislator of the Year for his work in support of the State's Emergency Medical Services (EMS). He has received one of the few A+ ratings in the entire legislature from the South Carolina Club for Growth.

== U.S. House of Representatives ==
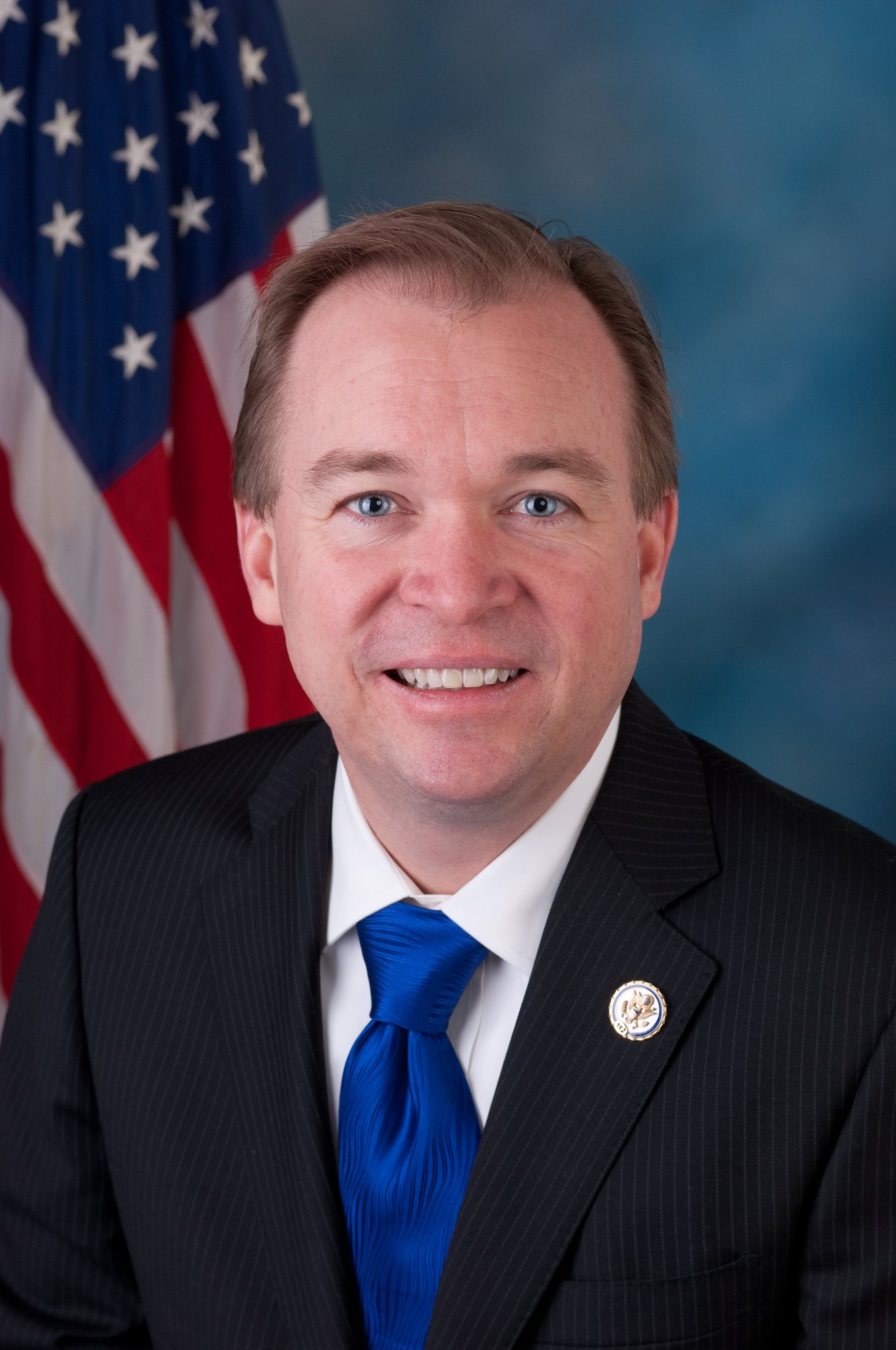
Official freshman portrait

=== Elections ===
2010

Mulvaney, a GOP Young Gun, ran against Democratic incumbent John M. Spratt Jr. for South Carolina's 5th congressional district. The race was highlighted by Mitt Romney's Free and Strong America PAC's "Take Congress Back: 10 in '10" initiative as one of the top 10 House challenger races. Mulvaney's involvement in the now-defunct Edenmoor real estate development in Lancaster County, South Carolina became a campaign issue, with his opponents alleging that he misled the Lancaster County council and taxpayers to provide $30 million in public funding for the real estate development and that once the public funds had been approved, Mulvaney sold his interest in the development to a third party at a $7 million profit. Mulvaney denied the allegations and said the project's failure was due to Democratic economic policies. He defeated Spratt, who had held the seat since 1983, with 55% of the vote.

Mulvaney's campaign against Spratt was aided by a 501(c)(4) organization named the Commission on Hope, Growth, and Opportunity. The group, which was established by anonymous donors and run by lobbyist Scott W. Reed, was accused by the watchdog Citizens for Responsibility and Ethics in Washington of violating federal campaign finance laws and disclosing false information to the Internal Revenue Service.

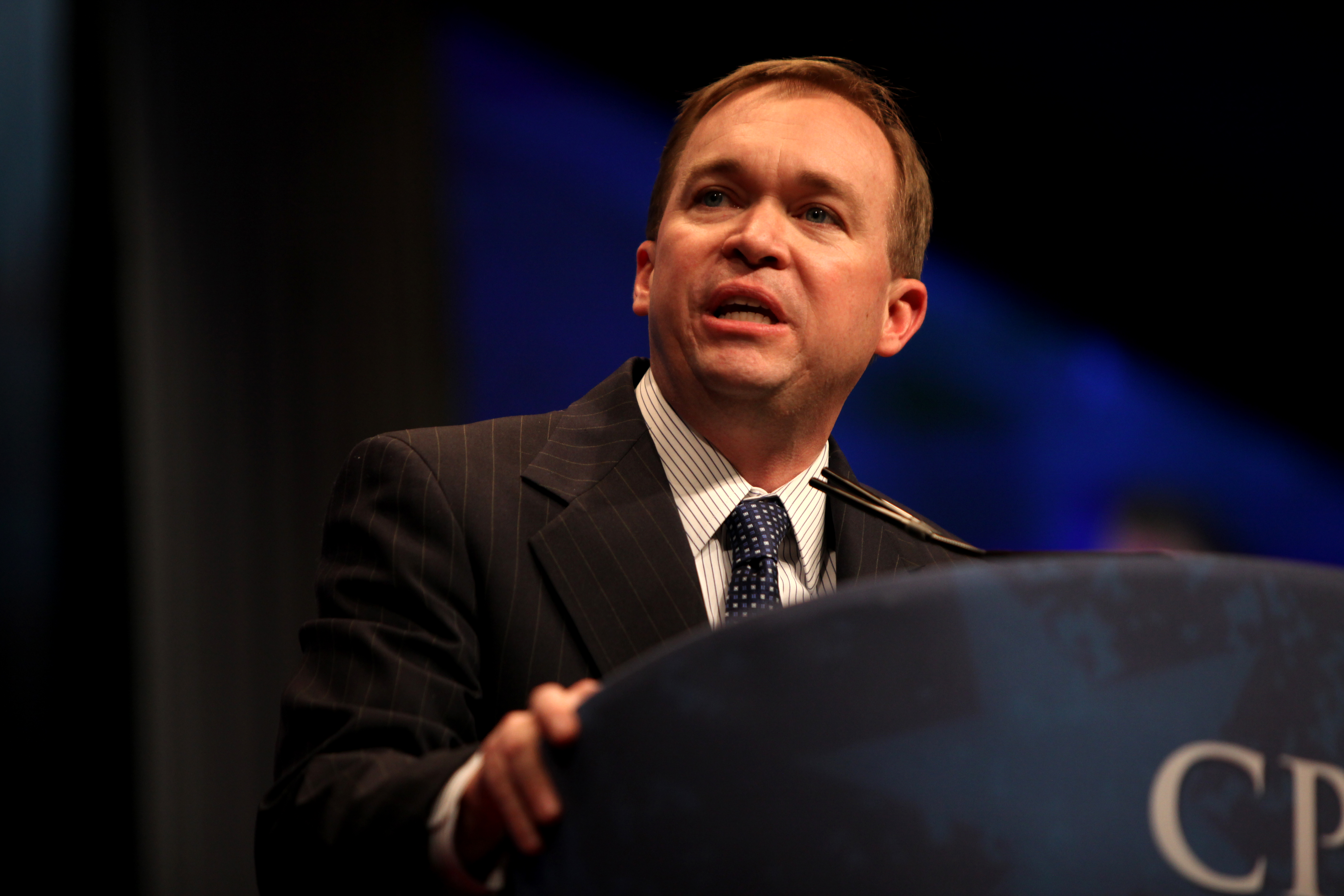
Speaking at the 2012 Conservative Political Action Conference (CPAC) in Washington, D.C.

2012

He won re-election to a second term by defeating Democrat Joyce Knott 56%–44%.

2014

He won re-election to a third term by defeating Democrat Tom Adams, a Fort Mill Town Council member, 59%–41%.

Mulvaney co-founded the bipartisan Blockchain Caucus, "meant to help congressmen stay up to speed on cryptocurrency and blockchain technologies," and develop policies that advance them.

2016

Mulvaney faced Ray Craig in the Republican primary and defeated him 78–22%. Mulvaney was re-elected to a fourth term, winning over 59% of the vote against Fran Person, a former aide to then-Vice President Joe Biden.

=== Tenure ===
During his time in the U.S. House, Mulvaney aligned himself with the Tea Party movement. He is a founding member of the Freedom Caucus.

He opposed gun control initiatives and the Affordable Care Act. In response to criticism for meeting with the paleoconservative John Birch Society in July 2016, Mulvaney said, "I regularly speak to groups across the political spectrum because my constituents deserve access to their congressman. I can't remember ever turning down an opportunity to speak to a group based on the group's political ideology."

==== Pay-to-play ====
In April 2018, Mulvaney told a room of banking industry executives and lobbyists that as a Congressman he refused to take meetings with lobbyists unless they contributed to his congressional campaigns. He said, "If you are a lobbyist who never gave us money, I did not talk to you. If you are a lobbyist who gave us money, I might talk to you." At the top of the hierarchy, he added, were his constituents: "If you came from back home and sat in my lobby, I talked to you without exception, regardless of the financial contributions."

==== Government shutdown ====
According to The New York Times, Mulvaney took "a hard line on spending during President Obama's term, vowing not to raise the nation's debt limit and embracing the term 'Shutdown Caucus' because of his willingness to shut the government down instead." In 2015, Mulvaney voted against a government-funding resolution, which would have prevented a government shutdown, in part because it included funding for Planned Parenthood. Explaining his vote, Mulvaney said, "This is not about women's health. It's about trafficking in pieces of dead children." After his appointment as head of the OMB in 2017, he reiterated his conditional position of support for a shutdown.

==== Regulations ====
Mulvaney supported the Regulatory Improvement Act of 2015, which would have "[created] a commission tasked with eliminating and revising outdated and redundant federal regulations".

==== Fiscal year 2014 budget ====
On December 10, 2013, Republican Representative Paul Ryan and Democratic Senator Patty Murray announced that they had negotiated the Bipartisan Budget Act of 2013, a proposed two-year budget deal. The budget deal capped the federal government's spending for Fiscal Year 2014 at $1.012 trillion and for Fiscal Year 2015 at $1.014.

The proposed deal eliminated some of the spending cuts required by the sequester by $45 billion of the cuts scheduled to happen in January and $18 billion of the cuts scheduled to happen in 2015. This did not decrease federal spending; instead, by reducing the amount of spending cuts the government was going to be forced to make by the sequester, it actually increased government spending by $45 billion and $18 billion over what would have been spent had the sequester remained in place. Some Republicans wanted Speaker John Boehner to pursue a temporary measure that would cover the rest of Fiscal Year 2014 at the level set by the sequester—$967 billion, rather than pass this budget deal, which would have $45 billion in additional spending.

The deal was designed to make up for this increase in spending by raising airline fees and changing the pension contribution requirements of new federal workers. According to The Hill, Mulvaney spearheaded opposition to the bill. He did not blame Ryan for the budget deal, instead saying the problem was that too few conservatives had been elected to Congress to pass a budget with a greater focus on debt reduction. Mulvaney said he expected the budget deal to pass because "it was designed to get the support of defense hawks and appropriators and Democrats", not conservatives.

On April 9, 2014, Mulvaney offered a proposal based on the Obama proposal as a substitute amendment in order to force a vote on the President's budget request. The President's proposal failed in a vote of 2–413, although Democrats were urged by their leadership to vote against this "political stunt".

==== Presidential endorsements ====
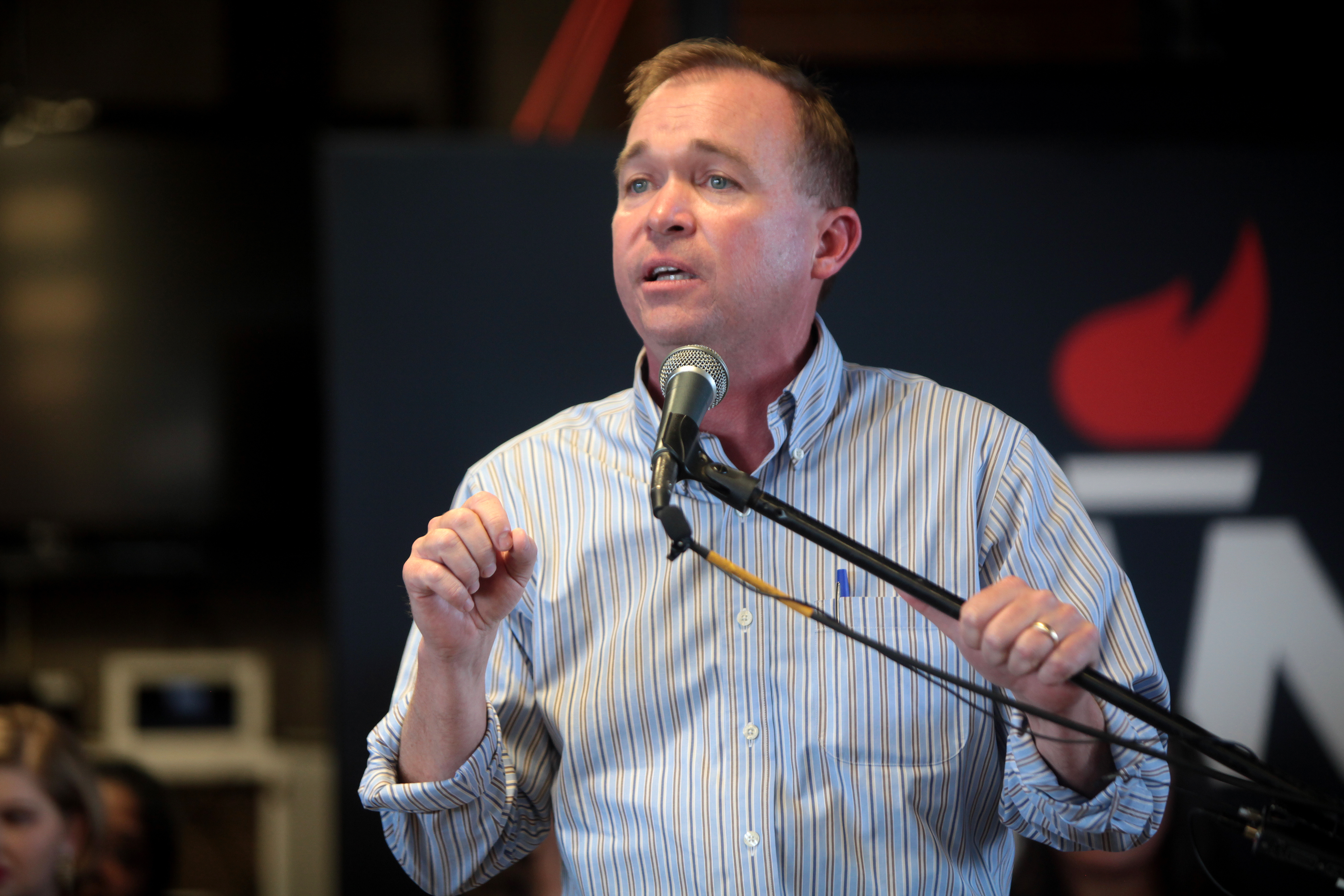
Speaking at a campaign event for Senator Rand Paul, September 2015

In September 2015, Mulvaney endorsed Kentucky Senator Rand Paul in the 2016 Republican Party presidential primaries.

Committee assignments

- Committee on Financial Services
- Committee on Small Business
  - Subcommittee on Healthcare and Technology
  - Subcommittee on Economic Growth, Tax and Capital Access
  - Subcommittee on Contracting and Workforce (chairman)

Caucus memberships

- Republican Study Committee
- Freedom Caucus
- Tea Party Caucus
- Liberty Caucus
- Congressional Constitution Caucus
- Congressional Blockchain Caucus

== Office of Management and Budget ==
=== Nomination ===
On December 16, 2016, Mulvaney was announced as President-elect Donald Trump's choice to be the director of the Office of Management and Budget.

Mulvaney's nomination as director-designate was reviewed in hearings held by the members of the United States Senate Committee on the Budget and the United States Senate Committee on Homeland Security and Governmental Affairs then presented to the full Senate for a vote.

In his statement to the Senate Budget Committee, Mulvaney admitted that he had failed to pay $15,000 in payroll taxes from 2000 to 2004 for his triplets' nanny. Mulvaney said he did not pay the taxes because he viewed the woman as a babysitter rather than as a household employee. After filling out a questionnaire from the Trump transition team he realized the lapse and began paying back taxes and fees. Senate Democrats noted that Republicans had previously insisted that past Democratic nominees' failure to pay taxes for their household employees was disqualifying, including former Health and Human Services nominee Tom Daschle in 2009.

On February 16, 2017, the Senate confirmed Mulvaney, 51–49, with Senator John McCain of Arizona joining all 48 Democrats to vote against his nomination. Democrats opposed his nomination because of his past efforts to slash budgets, as well as his role in government shutdowns.

=== Tenure ===
During his tenure as OMB director, Mulvaney sought to influence Trump to cut Social Security and Medicare. When he introduced himself to Gary Cohn, who was then Trump's chief economic advisor, Mulvaney said, "Hi, I'm a right-wing nutjob." While Mulvaney was known for his professed support for fiscal conservatism as a congressman, under Mulvaney's tenure as OMB director there was a dramatic expansion in the deficit as a result of both spending increases and tax cuts. The deficits were unusually high for a period of economic expansion.

==== Manipulated unemployment numbers claim ====
In March 2017, Mulvaney said he believed that "the Obama administration was manipulating the numbers, in terms of the number of people in the workforce, to make the unemployment rate—that percentage rate—look smaller than it actually was," and that "[w]hat you should really look at is the number of jobs created." There is no evidence that jobs numbers under the Obama administration were manipulated. FiveThirtyEight's Ben Casselman noted that "manipulating the jobs figures ... would mean not just messing with one number but rather interfering with an entire ecosystem of statistics [and] would require a conspiracy theory of massive proportions, involving hundreds if not thousands of people."

==== Criticism of the Congressional Budget Office ====
In March 2017, Mulvaney said the Congressional Budget Office was not capable of assessing the American Health Care Act, stating that "[i]f the CBO was right about Obamacare to begin with, there'd be eight million more people on Obamacare today than there actually are." According to FactCheck.Org, "[t]he CBO actually nailed the overall impact of the law on the uninsured pretty closely ... It's true (as Trump administration officials have repeatedly pointed out) that CBO greatly overestimated the number who would get government-subsidized coverage through the new insurance exchanges. But at the same time, CBO underestimated the number who would get coverage through expanding Medicaid. And whatever the failings of CBO's predictions, they were closer to the mark than those of the Obama administration and some other prominent forecasters." PolitiFact noted that "the initial CBO analysis of the Affordable Care Act did forecast that more people would participate in health care exchanges than actually did, but the CBO has revised those estimates. Moreover, independent analyses, as well as experts agree that the CBO offers some of the best estimates given the information available at the time."

In May 2017, Mulvaney was critical of the Congressional Budget Office (CBO) after it estimated the version of the American Health Care Act passed by the house in May 2017 would result in 23 million fewer people with health insurance. Mulvaney said the CBO's assessment was "absurd" and that "the days of relying on some nonpartisan Congressional Budget Office to do that work for us has probably come and gone."

==== Trump administration's budget proposals ====
While promoting the Trump administration's budget proposal in March 2017, Mulvaney said that, as to taxpayers, the government was "not gonna ask you for your hard-earned money, anymore ... unless we can guarantee to you that that money is actually being used in a proper function." For instance, Mulvaney justified cuts to block grants that go towards spending on Meals on Wheels because it was "just not showing any results". Others disagreed with Mulvaney's statement, citing research that has "found home-delivered meal programs to significantly improve diet quality, increase nutrient intakes, and reduce food insecurity and nutritional risk among participants. Other beneficial outcomes include increased socialization opportunities, improvement in dietary adherence, and higher quality of life."

On May 22, 2017, Mulvaney presented Trump's $4.1 trillion 2018 United States federal budget. The budget included cuts to the United States Department of State, the Environmental Protection Agency, and the social safety net and increases in funding for defense spending and paid family leave. The "America First" budget included a 10.6% decrease in domestic program spending and a 10% increase in military spending, in addition to $1.6 billion for a border wall. The budget would remove $272 billion from welfare programs, including $272 billion from the Supplemental Nutrition Assistance Program, also known as food stamps. The budget would also remove $800 billion from Medicaid, and $72 billion from Social Security disability benefits, while removing nothing from Social Security retirement or Medicare benefits. Mulvaney projected the budget will not add to the federal deficit because future tax cuts will lead to 3% GDP growth. He described the budget as "the first time in a long time that an administration has written a budget through the eyes of the people who are actually paying the taxes."

In December 2017, Trump signed the Tax Cuts and Jobs Act of 2017. The United States Congress Joint Committee on Taxation forecasted that with dynamic scoring, the $1.5 trillion reduction in revenues will increase the federal deficit by $1 trillion. Regulatory implementation of the tax cuts have been delayed by a dispute between Mulvaney and Treasury Secretary Steven Mnuchin regarding the involvement of the Office of Information and Regulatory Affairs.

In February 2018, Mulvaney released the president's $4.4 trillion 2019 United States federal budget, which would add $984 billion to the federal deficit that year, and $7 trillion over the next 10 years. Later that month, the President signed the Bipartisan Budget Act of 2018, which allowed yearly federal deficits to reach $1 trillion. In March 2018, Congress ultimately passed the $1.3 trillion Consolidated Appropriations Act, 2018, which funded the government's operations until the end of the fiscal year in September.

==== Ethics waivers ====
On April 28, 2017, Walter Shaub, the director of the United States Office of Government Ethics (OGE) issued a data request to see the ethics waivers given to ex-lobbyists in the executive branch, which Mulvaney refused, writing a letter that seemed to question OGE's authority to collect ethics records. On May 22, Shaub sent Mulvaney, in addition to every federal ethics officer, every inspector general, and the six members of Congress responsible for government oversight, a 10-page response reasserting his legal authority to see the ethics waivers. On May 26, Mulvaney sent a second letter denying that his first letter had questioned OGE's authority, and providing the information requested. Thereafter, on May 30, the White House complied with Shaub's data call by posting its waivers online. On August 1, Senators Chuck Grassley, Dianne Feinstein, and Gary Peters sent a bipartisan letter to Mulvaney demanding that the White House continue releasing its waivers on a continuing basis. On September 21, OGE's acting director, David Apol, issued a memorandum declaring that the White House would comply with this congressional request. On October 19, the White House released a second batch of waivers on its website.

==== Government shutdown ====
In a press briefing on May 2, 2017, Mulvaney said a "good shutdown" of the federal government might be necessary in September. He defined such a situation as one "that fixes Washington, D.C. permanently". In the same conference call to reporters, Mulvaney defended a funding package which contained no funds for Trump's proposed border wall. The call became infamous after being plagued with technical problems and interruptions.

== Consumer Financial Protection Bureau ==
=== Appointment ===
Former Trump campaign manager Corey Lewandowski had encouraged President Donald Trump to replace Consumer Financial Protection Bureau (CFPB) Director Richard Cordray. As a congressman, Mulvaney had been a strong critic of the CFPB, calling it a "sick, sad" joke, and co-sponsoring legislation for its elimination. Trump appointed Mulvaney to serve as acting director of the CFPB under the Federal Vacancies Reform Act of 1998 (FVRA), which allows for the president to appoint an interim replacement without Senate confirmation. However, a dispute arose over whether Mulvaney could be so-named under the FVRA or whether a provision of the Dodd-Frank Act controls, which would make the deputy director, Leandra English, acting director of the CFPB instead. This led to a court battle, English v. Trump. On November 28, 2017, U.S. District Judge Timothy J. Kelly denied English's motion for a preliminary injunction and allowed Mulvaney to continue serving as CFPB acting director.

=== Tenure ===
According to an April 2019 review of Mulvaney's tenure as CFPB head by The New York Times, Mulvaney had undermined the enforcement and regulatory powers of the bureau. What was "perhaps Washington's most feared financial regulator" had through "strategic neglect and bureaucratic self-sabotage" begun to work against the very interests it was created to defend. Mulvaney immediately stopped hiring at the CFPB, stopped collecting fines, suspended rulemaking, and ordered all active investigations reviewed. Mulvaney also sharply reduced agency personnel's access to bank data, arguing that it posed a security risk. On January 18, 2018, Mulvaney submitted a quarterly budget request for the CFPB to the Federal Reserve for $0.

In January 2018, Mulvaney canceled an investigation into a South Carolina payday lender who had previously donated to his congressional campaigns. He also dropped a lawsuit the CFPB was pursuing against an online lender the bureau had found was charging 950% interest. Mulvaney suspended a short-term payday loan regulation. In addition to payday lenders, Mulvaney also scaled back efforts to go after auto lenders and others accused of preying on vulnerable consumers. By April 2018, more than four months after taking charge of the CFPB, Mulvaney had not undertaken a single enforcement action against finance companies; the previous CFPB director, Richard Cordray, averaged two to four enforcement actions per month. Mulvaney accepted nearly $63,000 in donations by payday lenders while he was a congressman.

In April 2018, Mulvaney submitted the CFPB's annual report to Congress, in which he recommended the bureau's funding should be made to require congressional appropriations, that its future rulemaking should require legislative approval, and that he, the director, should be made removable without cause by the President.

The Community Financial Services Association of America, a trade association representing the payday lending industry, praised Mulvaney's approach, calling it "relatively passive".

In April 2018, it was reported that Mulvaney had given some of his political appointees at the CFPB raises. Mulvaney hired at least eight appointees after he took over the agency and created positions for some the appointees which did not exist under Cordray's tenure at the CFPB.

In April 2018, Mulvaney said he would shut down public access to the CFPB's online database of consumer complaints where consumers could post complaints and the CFPB used to guide its investigations. Mulvaney said, "I don't see anything in here that says I have to run a Yelp for financial services sponsored by the federal government." As the database was mandated by law, it could not be shut down, only closed to the public. A review of Mulvaney's campaign contributions as a congressman showed that eight of the 10 firms with the most complaints about them had contributed to Mulvaney's campaigns. Under Mulvaney's successor, Kathy Kraninger, the proposal to keep complaints secret from public access was reversed, though corporations would be allowed space to respond to complaints on the CFPB's website, and the implementation of various changes to the way the complaints and enforcement actions would be presented, could present the subjects of complaints in a more favorable light.

Under Mulvaney, at the same time publicly announced Bureau enforcement actions dropped to a quarter of their previous annual averages, consumer complaints rose substantially.

In April 2018, Mulvaney announced a $1 billion fine against Wells Fargo for fraudulent practices. The case against Wells Fargo started prior to Mulvaney's tenure, and there were reports that Mulvaney considered dropping the case. Amid this reporting, Trump warned that the bank would be fined.

In May 2018, The New York Times reported that Mulvaney worked two to three days a week at the CFPB, a few hours at a time.

In August 2018, it was reported that Mulvaney was considering rolling back oversight of military lenders. The Military Lending Act was devised to protect military service members and their families from financial fraud, predatory loans and credit card gouging.

== White House chief of staff ==
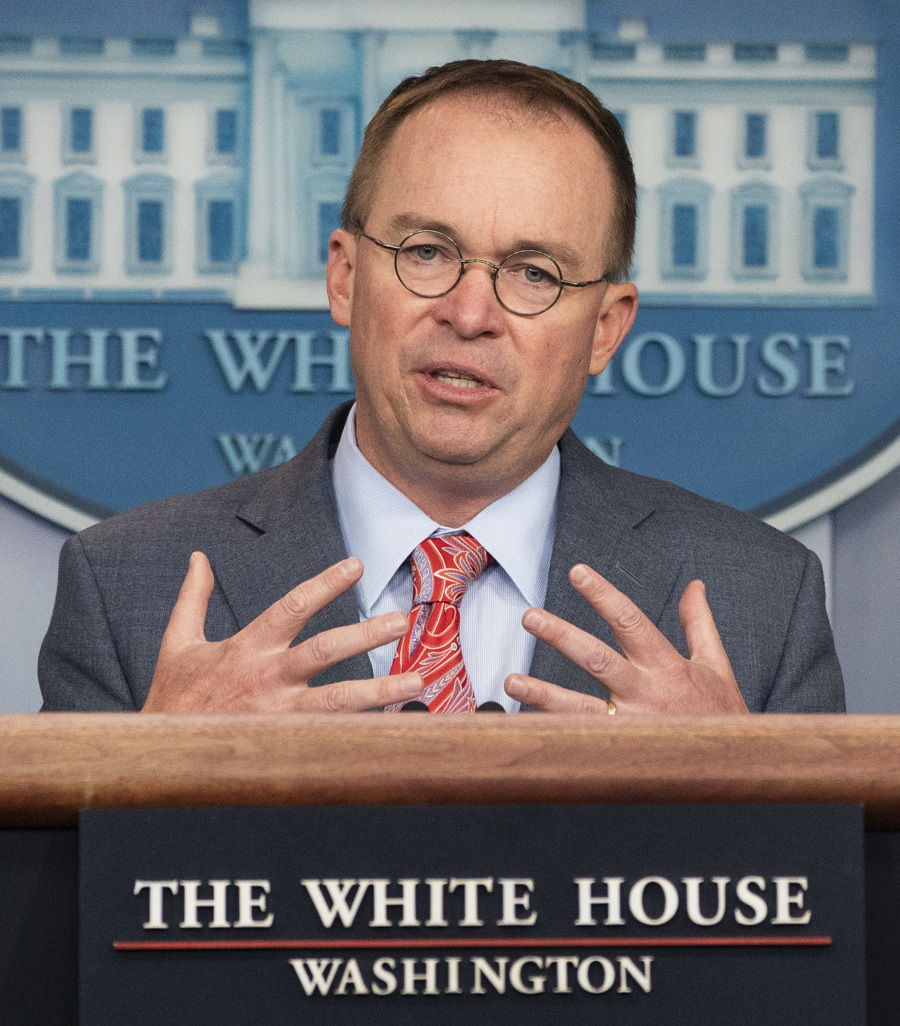
October 2019 press briefing

=== Appointment ===
On December 14, 2018, Trump named Mulvaney as his acting White House chief of staff beginning in the new year. Prior to Trump's election, Mulvaney had characterized the future president as a "terrible human being," said he would be disqualified from office in an "ordinary universe," and described Trump's views on a wall on the US-Mexico border as "absurd and almost childish". On March 6, 2020, President Trump named Congressman Mark Meadows as Mulvaney's replacement.

=== Tenure ===
Upon assuming office as chief of staff, Mulvaney appointed several individuals with views similar to his to White House positions, most notably Joe Grogan to lead the United States Domestic Policy Council.

In March 2019, Mulvaney said, "every single (health care) plan that this White House has ever put forward since Donald Trump was elected covered pre-existing conditions." The Associated Press described the claim as "misleading" and PolitiFact rated this assertion "mostly false", stating that all the health care proposals supported by the White House would have weakened protections for individuals with preexisting conditions, and led to gaps in health insurance coverage and higher premium rates.

On March 6, 2020, Trump tweeted that Republican North Carolina Congressman Mark Meadows would succeed Mulvaney as White House chief of staff. Meadows began serving at the end of March, thus replacing Mulvaney.

Mulvaney wrote an op-ed in the Wall Street Journal three days after the November 2020 election day, titled "If He Loses, Trump Will Concede Gracefully: He'll fight hard to make sure the results are fair, and in the end he'll accept the result whatever it is." Trump did not do so after his loss in the 2020 United States presidential election.

==== Trump–Ukraine scandal ====
External videos
- Mick Mulvaney – Press Briefing; October 17, 2019

Mulvaney was closely involved in the Trump–Ukraine scandal. In an October 17, 2019, press conference, Mulvaney said that military aid to Ukraine was in fact tied to President Trump's demand for an investigation into the 2016 election. Several hours later, in a statement released by the White House, Mulvaney sought to deny or reinterpret his earlier statements, stating "there was absolutely no quid pro quo between Ukrainian military aid and any investigation into the 2016 election".

==== OMB emails released ====
On January 22, 2020, Mulvaney released a series of heavily redacted Office of Management and Budget (OMB) emails revealing details about how the OMB worked to carry out the freeze of aid for Ukraine.

=== Conspiracy beliefs regarding COVID ===
In February 2020, Mulvaney alleged that claims of a deep state working against President Trump were "absolutely 100% true." Later that month, Mulvaney suggested that the media was exaggerating the dangers of COVID-19 in order to "bring down" President Trump.

== Subsequent career ==
Upon his resignation as chief of staff, Mulvaney was named special envoy for Northern Ireland, a role which had last been held by Gary Hart, but had gone unfilled since Trump's inauguration. His swearing-in was delayed due to the coronavirus epidemic, which also prevented him from making a planned trip to Northern Ireland as envoy in July 2020. Because of social distancing restrictions, he was sworn in via a FaceTime call on May 1, 2020.

In the aftermath of the 2020 presidential election, The Wall Street Journal published an op-ed by Mulvaney which argued that Trump would concede if he lost the election; after Joe Biden won the election and Trump did not concede, Politico named Mulvaney's prediction one of "the most audacious, confident and spectacularly incorrect prognostications about the year."

Mulvaney resigned his position as special envoy on the evening of January 6, 2021, following the U.S. Capitol protests in which a crowd of Trump supporters stormed the U.S. Capitol building to protest the certification of President-elect Joe Biden's Electoral College victory. The next morning, Mulvaney told a CNBC reporter that his resignation had been principled: "We didn't sign up for what you saw last night. We signed up for making America great again, we signed up for lower taxes and less regulation." He added that Trump was "not the same as he was eight months ago." He suggested that other administration officials also planned to resign, while others planned to stay only to prevent Trump from filling their position with "someone worse" during his last two weeks in office.

In 2021, Mulvaney was mentioned as a possible replacement for Kay Coles James as president of the Heritage Foundation, a conservative think tank.

In March 2022, CBS News hired Mulvaney as a paid on-air contributor. CBS News co-president Neeraj Khemlani said that the choice was part of a conscious effort to hire more Republican commentators: "Being able to make sure that we are getting access to both sides of the aisle is a priority because we know the Republicans are going to take over, most likely, in the midterms." The Washington Post reported that the decision was controversial among network employees, due to Mulvaney's history within the Trump administration and its adversarial attitude towards the news media.

== Personal life ==
Mulvaney is a Roman Catholic. He is a supernumerary in Opus Dei.

He married Pamela West, who he met in line at a bookstore while he was a law student, in 1998. The couple have triplets (born in 2000), named Finn, James, and Caroline.

Mulvaney's brother, Ted, is portfolio manager for Braeburn Capital, the investment arm of Apple Inc.

== See also ==
- Timeline of investigations into Trump and Russia (2019–2020)

== Notes ==
U.S. House of Representatives
Preceded by John Spratt	Member of the U.S. House of Representatives from South Carolina's 5th congressional district 2011–2017	Succeeded by Ralph Norman
Political offices
Preceded by Shaun Donovan	Director of the Office of Management and Budget; 2017–2020; On leave: 2019–2020	Succeeded by Russell Vought
Preceded by John F. Kelly	White House Chief of Staff; Acting; 2019–2020	Succeeded by Mark Meadows
Government offices
Preceded by Leandra English; Acting	Director of the Consumer Financial Protection Bureau; Acting; 2017–2018	Succeeded by Kathy Kraninger
Diplomatic posts
Vacant Title last held by Gary Hart; 2017	United States Special Envoy for Northern Ireland; 2020–2021	Vacant Title next held by Joe Kennedy III; 2022
U.S. order of precedence (ceremonial)
Preceded by Thomas Hartnett as Former U.S. Representative	Order of precedence of the United States as Former U.S. Representative	Succeeded by Robert Hurt as Former U.S. Representative
