= Braeburn Capital =

Asset management company owned by Apple

Braeburn Capital Inc.
- Type: Subsidiary
- Industry: Asset management Investment management
- Founded: October 3, 2005; 21 years ago in Reno, Nevada, U.S.
- Headquarters: Reno, Nevada, U.S.
- AUM: US$268.9 billion (2017)
- Parent: Apple
- Website: braeburncapital.com (Redirects to Apple)

Braeburn Capital Inc. is an asset management company based in Reno, Nevada, and a wholly owned subsidiary of Apple. Its offices are located at 6900 S. McCarran Boulevard in Reno. It is one of the largest investment companies in the world.

== History ==
Apple created the company on October 3, 2005, to better manage its assets and to avoid certain California state taxes and taxes from other U.S. states totalling millions of dollars. According to one source, in 2006 an Apple spokesperson stated that Braeburn Capital was a "regional treasury office".

Described as a hedge fund, in 2012 it was stated that the company is virtually unknown within the financial sector and is tasked with investing cash generated by Apple, with little known about the investment decisions they make, with the exception of larger investments. As a division of Apple, Braeburn Capital does not file data with the American stock market regulator or the Investment Adviser Public Disclosure register.

The Financial Times stated in 2013 that the way the company invests, specifically in a wide range of quality fixed-income securities, shared synergies with the type of investment strategy an insurance company would follow, aiming to ensure capital is preserved.

In news coverage about the company that was written in 2015 (later updated in 2022) the companies investment activities were described as secretive. In 2018, it was reported that Braeburn Capital manages a $244 billion financial portfolio, which is 70% of Apple’s total book assets. Three years later, it was reported that Braeburn Capital invests in highly rated securities, to minimize risk.

== Capital ==
Apple's cash, and short-term and long-term investments
Year	Value (billion USD)
2005	8.3
2006	10.1
2007	18.45
2008	24.49
2009	33.99
2010	51.01
2011	81.57
2012	121.25
2013	146.76
2014	155.24
2015	205.67
2016	237.59
2017	268.90
2018	237.10
2019	205.9
2020	191.8
2021	190.5
2022	48.3
2023	166.5
2024	162.5
2025

In 2012, Wall Street analysts calculated that Apple could earn up to $45.6 billion in fiscal year 2012, a record for any American business. By national and international diversions of revenues and many other legal methods, Apple stood to save billions of dollars in taxes.

== Name ==
The name Braeburn refers to a particular cultivar of apple. This is a play on the name of the parent company Apple.

== Personnel ==
Mick Mulvaney's brother Theodore "Ted" Mulvaney is portfolio manager for Braeburn Capital. Other officers of the company, listed in the Nevada Annual Report include Apple attorney Gene Levoff, Michael Shapiro and Gary Wipfler, Apple's treasurer.
