= Leandra English =

American government official

Deputy Director of the Consumer Financial Protection Bureau
- In office November 24, 2017 – July 9, 2018
- President: Donald Trump
- Preceded by: David Silberman (acting)
- Succeeded by: Brian Johnson (acting)

Director of the Consumer Financial Protection Bureau
- Acting; November 25, 2017 (One minute)
- President: Donald Trump
- Deputy: Herself
- Preceded by: Richard Cordray
- Succeeded by: Mick Mulvaney (acting)

Personal details
- Education: New York University (BA); London School of Economics (MS)

Leandra English is an American government official and political advisor.

She served as an advisor to the Superintendent of the New York State Department of Financial Services. She formerly was the Deputy Director of the Consumer Financial Protection Bureau (CFPB) from November 24, 2017 until her resignation on July 9, 2018. As Deputy Director of the Consumer Financial Protection Bureau (CFPB), by operation of law, she had served as Acting Director of the Consumer Financial Protection Bureau (CFPB) for one minute on November 25, 2017 immediately following the resignation of Director Richard Cordray taking effect at the stroke of midnight (12:00 A.M.) Eastern Standard Time (EST) on November 25, 2017 until President Donald Trump’s appointment of Office of Management and Budget (OMB) Director Mick Mulvaney as Acting Director of the Consumer Financial Protection Bureau (CFPB) took effect one minute later at 12:01 A.M. Eastern Standard Time (EST) on November 25, 2017. She was the plaintiff in the lawsuit English v. Trump, in which she unsuccessfully sought to have herself acknowledged as Acting Director of the CFPB.

== Career ==
English has served in many capacities as a member of the U.S. federal government. Before joining the CFPB, she worked in both the U.S. Office of Management and Budget (OMB) and the Department of the Treasury. She worked on the transition team that launched the new agency in 2010. She later served as Deputy Chief of Staff. She then returned to OMB, serving as senior advisor to the Deputy Director of Management. She returned to CFPB in 2015, serving as Deputy Chief Operating Officer and then Chief of Staff.

=== CFPB leadership controversy ===
On November 24, 2017, English was appointed Deputy Director of the CFPB by outgoing Director Richard Cordray. Cordray resigned his position as Director effective at the stroke of midnight (12:00 A.M.) Eastern Standard Time (EST) on November 25, 2017, and sent a letter to CFPB staff announcing that English would serve as Acting Director. That same evening, President Donald Trump appointed the Director of the Office of Management and Budget, Mick Mulvaney, as the Acting Director of the CFPB. On November 26, 2017, English filed a lawsuit in the United States District Court for the District of Columbia to block Mulvaney from taking leadership of the CFPB. English was represented in the lawsuit by appellate lawyer and former CFPB official Deepak Gupta. Two days later, November 28, 2017, a federal judge rejected English's emergency request to block President Trump's appointment of Mulvaney. A few weeks later, on January 10, 2018, a court ruled against English.

English has received backing from a number of current and former Democratic legislators calling her the rightful Acting Director, including Senator Elizabeth Warren, Senator Sherrod Brown, Senator Richard Durbin, Representative Nancy Pelosi, and former Representative Barney Frank, co-author of the Dodd-Frank Act. A number of law professors also support her position, including Laurence Tribe, Martin Lederman, and Nina Mendelson.

The Federal Vacancies Reform Act (FVRA) allows the president to appoint an interim replacement for an appointed officer of an executive agency without Senate confirmation, but the FVRA does not provide the "exclusive means" for filling a vacancy when "a statutory provision...designates an officer or employee to perform the functions and duties of a specified office temporarily in an acting capacity." The law establishing the CFPB (the Dodd–Frank Act) is arguably unclear about whether the director's resignation qualifies as "unavailability" under FVRA, leading to confusion as to who would lead the agency and setting up a legal battle.

The Office of Legal Counsel has consistently interpreted the FVRA as providing a non-exclusive option for appointing a successor when another, more specific option exists in another statute (in this case, the Dodd–Frank Act). The Office of Legal Counsel thus released an opinion that the FVRA gives the President the right to appoint an interim successor in this case. The top lawyer at the CFPB concurred with the Trump administration's opinion and directed all staff at the agency to disregard English's claims to be the Acting Director.

She resigned from office on July 9, 2018, in light of President Trump's nomination of Kathy Kraninger to serve as CFPB director full-time. She was succeeded by Brian Johnson, who was appointed to serve in an acting capacity.

=== Later career ===
In 2020, English was named a volunteer member of the Joe Biden presidential transition Agency Review Team to support transition efforts related to the Consumer Financial Protection Bureau.

Government offices
Preceded by David Silberman; Acting	Deputy Director of the Consumer Financial Protection Bureau; 2017–2018	Succeeded by Brian Johnson; Acting
Preceded by Richard Cordray	Director of the Consumer Financial Protection Bureau; Acting; 2017	Succeeded by Mick Mulvaney; Acting
