= Deborah Long =

American optometrist and politician

Deborah Adair Long (born 27 November 1955) is an American optometrist and politician.

Deborah Adair was born to parents Don and Sue Adair on 27 November 1955 in Chapel Hill, North Carolina. She graduated from the University of North Carolina–Chapel Hill and the Southern College of Optometry in 1976 and 1980, respectively. In 1981, Adair married Jim Long. She is a resident of Indian Land, South Carolina.

Deborah Long defeated Bruce Miller in the 2008 Republican Party primary for district 45 of the South Carolina House of Representatives, and won that year's general election against Fred Thomas, replacing Mick Mulvaney in office. She was unopposed in the 2012 and 2014 election cycles. Long did not contest the 2016 legislative election, and was succeeded in office by Brandon Newton.
