= Mike Crites =

American lawyer

United States Attorney for the Southern District of Ohio
- In office October 3, 1986 – January 20, 1993
- President: Ronald Reagan; George H. W. Bush
- Preceded by: Anthony Nyktas
- Succeeded by: Edmund Sargus

Personal details
- Born: Don Michael Crites; June 16, 1948 (age 78) Bluffton, Ohio, U.S.
- Party: Republican
- Spouse: Kristina Burgess Crites
- Education: United States Naval Academy; Ohio Northern University
- Occupation: Attorney (retired)

Don Michael Crites (born June 16, 1948) is an American politician and member of the Republican Party and former United States Attorney for the Southern District of Ohio in the administrations of Presidents Ronald Reagan and George H. W. Bush. He was a candidate for Ohio Attorney General in 2008. He currently resides in Lancaster, Ohio. Crites officially retired in December 2022.

== Early life and education ==
Crites was born in Bluffton, Ohio and raised in Lima, Ohio. Upon graduation from Lima Shawnee High School in 1966, he received an appointment to the United States Naval Academy and graduated in 1970. He was commissioned an officer in the United States Navy and served in the United States Navy and Naval Reserve until October 1999 retiring with the rank of Captain.

He received his B.S. from the United States Naval Academy and his J.D. from Ohio Northern University Pettit College of Law in 1978.

== Naval career ==
Crites is a retired captain in the United States Naval Reserve. He studied at the Naval War College and Industrial College of the Armed Forces. He also served as Deputy Commander for Mission Effectiveness, Naval Reserve Readiness Command Region 8 in Jacksonville, Florida.

A Vietnam veteran, Crites received the Legion of Merit, Meritorious Service Medal, Joint Service Commendation Medal, Navy Commendation Medal, the Navy Achievement Medal, and various campaign and service awards, including the Vietnam Service Medal and Vietnam Campaign Medal.

A member of the Veterans of Foreign Wars, Crites was inducted into the Ohio Veterans Hall of Fame in 2000.

== U.S. Attorney ==
Crites was nominated in 1986 by President Ronald Reagan and confirmed by a vote of the United States Senate to be the United States Attorney for the Southern District of Ohio. He served in that position from 1986 to 1993 in the administrations of Presidents Reagan and Bush.

During his tenure as U.S. Attorney, Crites prosecuted Pete Rose.

== Legal Practice ==
Crites' legal career has included service as United States Attorney for the Southern District of Ohio, Assistant United States Attorney, First Assistant Prosecuting Attorney (Delaware County), Assistant Prosecuting Attorney (Allen County), City Prosecutor (Lima, Ohio) and City law director for several central Ohio communities. He joined the law firm of Dinsmore & Shohl, LLP in Columbus, Ohio in 2008, focusing on white collar defense, government investigations and regulatory enforcement. Crites was previously a managing partner of the "mid-size" Columbus law firm, Rich, Crites & Dittmer, where he specialized in "complex civil cases and defending manufacturers in product-liability claims," According to the Columbus Dispatch.

== 2008 Election for Ohio Attorney General ==
Crites announced his candidacy for Ohio Attorney General on July 23, 2008, as a Republican running against Democrat Richard Cordray and Independent Robert M. Owens in a special election for attorney general that was held when the previous officeholder, Democrat Marc Dann, who was embroiled in a sex scandal, resigned on May 14, 2008. Potential Republican candidates, including Montgomery, Jim Petro, DeWine, Maureen O'Connor, and Rob Portman declined to enter the race. According to the Columbus Dispatch, Cordray had a large financial advantage over his opponents with approximately 30 times as much campaign financing as Crites.

Crites' campaign strategies included attempts to link Cordray with Dann—an association The Columbus Dispatch called into question—and promoting himself as having more years of prosecutorial experience. Cordray asserted that he managed the state's money safely despite the turbulence of the 2008 financial crisis.

He received 38% of the vote.

Legal offices
Preceded by Anthony Nyktas	United States Attorney for the Southern District of Ohio; October 3, 1986 – January 20, 1993	Succeeded by Edmund Sargus
Party political offices
Preceded by Betty Montgomery	Republican nominee for Attorney General of Ohio; 2008	Succeeded by Mike DeWine
