= David Silberman (government administrator) =

American government official

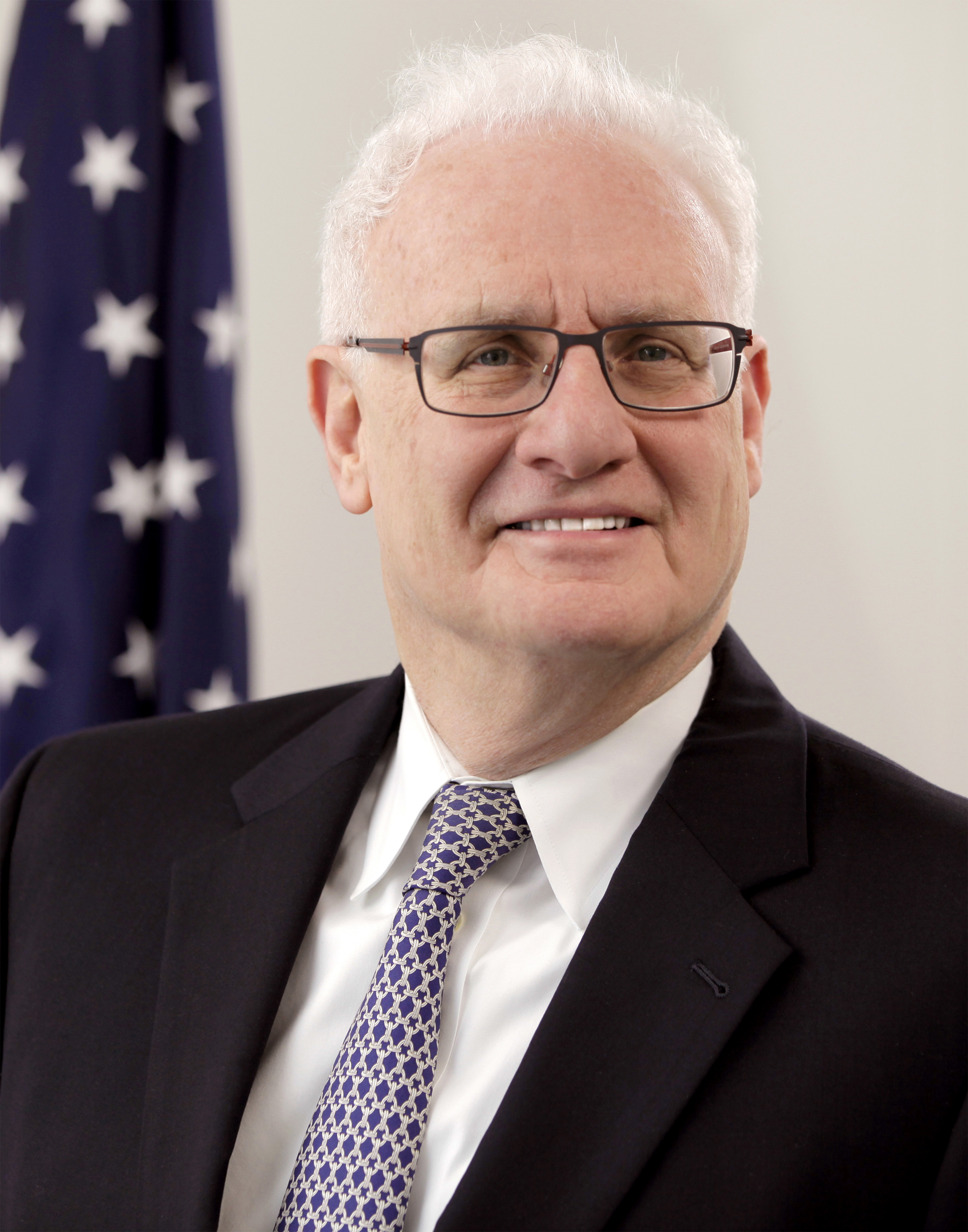

Deputy Director of the Consumer Financial Protection Bureau
- Acting
- In office January 11, 2016 – November 24, 2017
- President: Barack Obama; Donald Trump
- Preceded by: Meredith Fuchs (acting)
- Succeeded by: Leandra English

Personal details
- Education: Brandeis University; Harvard Law School

David M. Silberman is an American government administrator who served as the associate director for Research, Markets, and Regulation at the Consumer Financial Protection Bureau. Silberman also previously served as the agency's Acting Deputy Director, until the appointment of Leandra English to the office.

== Career ==
Silberman began his law career as a clerk for D.C. Circuit Judge David Bazelon, Supreme Court Justice Thurgood Marshall, and later as a member of the law firm Bredhoff & Kaiser.

Before joining the Consumer Financial Protection Bureau, Silberman served as general counsel and Executive Vice President of Kessler Financial Services. The company's focus is to "develop more effective partnerships, optimize the value of credit card portfolios, fund risk-based marketing campaigns, and develop and execute marketing strategies."

Silberman served as president and CEO of Union Privilege while he was deputy general counsel of the AFL–CIO. The company provided financial services to union members, as well as the first AFL-CIO credit card program.

Silberman has argued three cases before the Supreme Court and briefed many others.

== Personal life ==
He is the son of Charles E. Silberman. He is married to Claire Engers. He has three sons: Peter, Eric, and Jonathan.

== See also ==
- List of law clerks for the tenth seat of the Supreme Court of the United States

Government offices
Preceded by Meredith Fuchs; Acting	Deputy Director of the Consumer Financial Protection Bureau; Acting; 2016–2017	Succeeded by Leandra English
