= Richard Cordray =

American lawyer & politician (born 1959)

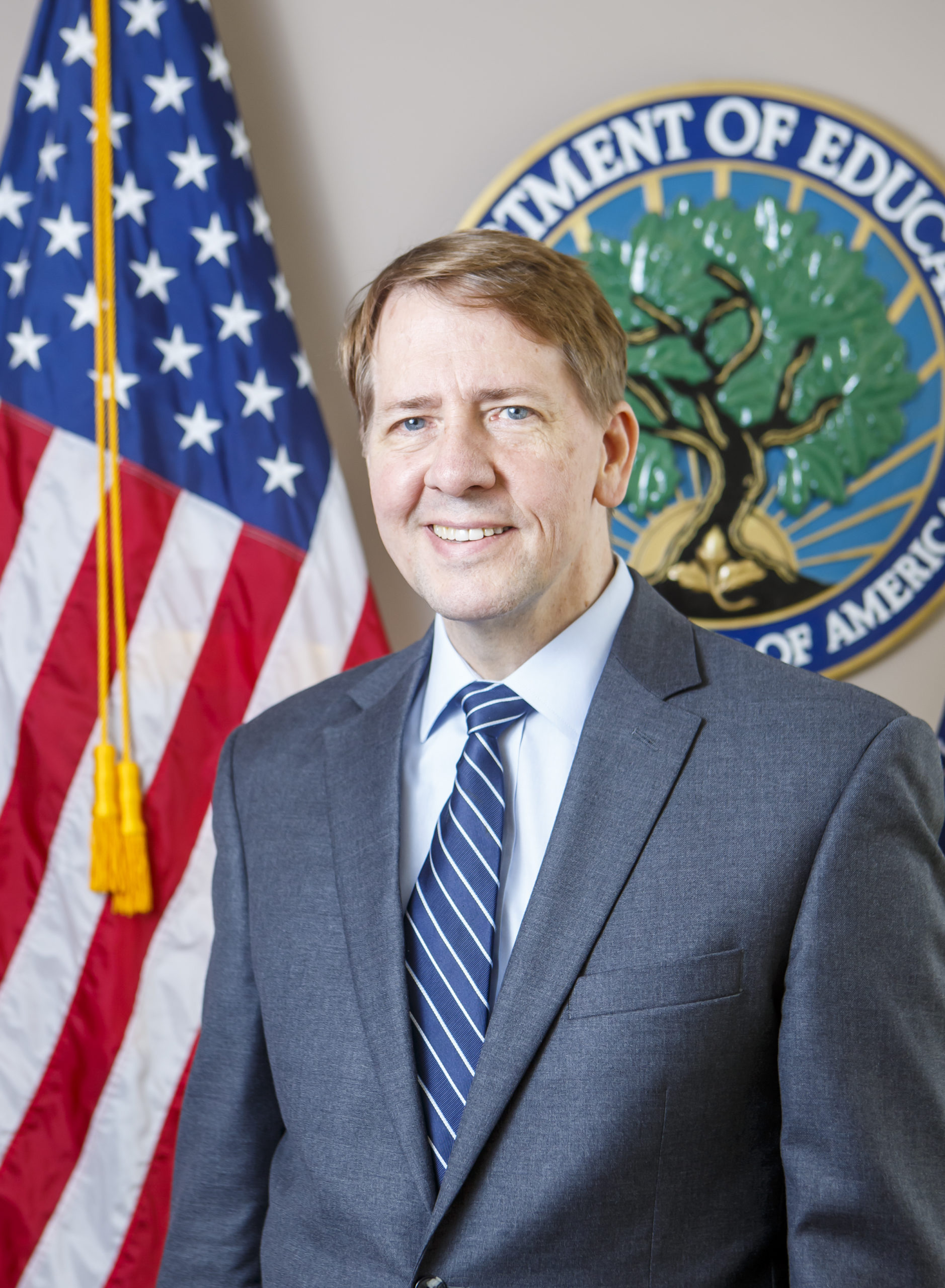
- Official portrait, 2021

Chief Operating Officer of Federal Student Aid
- In office May 3, 2021 – July 2024
- President: Joe Biden
- Preceded by: Mark Brown
- Succeeded by: Denise L. Carter (acting)

1st Director of the Consumer Financial Protection Bureau
- In office January 4, 2012 – November 24, 2017
- President: Barack Obama; Donald Trump
- Deputy: Steve Antonakes; Meredith Fuchs (acting); David Silberman (acting); Leandra English
- Preceded by: Raj Date (special advisor)
- Succeeded by: Kathy Kraninger

49th Attorney General of Ohio
- In office January 8, 2009 – January 10, 2011
- Governor: Ted Strickland
- Preceded by: Nancy H. Rogers
- Succeeded by: Mike DeWine

46th Treasurer of Ohio
- In office January 8, 2007 – January 7, 2009
- Governor: Ted Strickland
- Preceded by: Jennette Bradley
- Succeeded by: Kevin Boyce

Treasurer of Franklin County
- In office December 9, 2002 – January 8, 2007
- Preceded by: Wade Steen
- Succeeded by: Ed Leonard

1st Solicitor General of Ohio
- In office September 19, 1993 – January 6, 1995
- Governor: George Voinovich
- Preceded by: Position established
- Succeeded by: Jeffrey Sutton

Member of the Ohio House of Representatives from the 33rd district
- In office January 7, 1991 – December 31, 1992
- Preceded by: Don Gilmore
- Succeeded by: Priscilla Mead

Personal details
- Born: Richard Adams Cordray; May 3, 1959 (age 67) Columbus, Ohio, U.S.
- Party: Democratic
- Spouse: Peggy Cordray (m. 1992)
- Children: 2
- Education: Michigan State University (BA); Brasenose College, Oxford (MA); University of Chicago (JD)

Richard Adams Cordray (born May 3, 1959) is an American lawyer and politician who served from 2021 to 2024 as chief operating officer of Federal Student Aid in the U.S. Department of Education. A member of the Democratic Party, he served from 2012 to 2017 as the first director of the Consumer Financial Protection Bureau (CFPB) and previously as Ohio attorney general, solicitor general, and state treasurer. Cordray was the Democratic nominee in the 2018 Ohio gubernatorial election.

Cordray was raised near Columbus, Ohio, and graduated from Michigan State University before studying at Brasenose College, Oxford, as a Marshall Scholar. He later earned a J.D. degree from the University of Chicago Law School, where he served as editor-in-chief of the University of Chicago Law Review. Cordray was a five-time Jeopardy! champion in 1987.

Cordray was elected to the Ohio House of Representatives in 1990. After redistricting, he unsuccessfully sought election to the U.S. House of Representatives in 1992. In 1993, he was appointed Ohio's first solicitor general, a position in which he argued six cases before the U.S. Supreme Court. After leaving office in 1995, he entered private practice and mounted unsuccessful campaigns for Ohio attorney general in 1998 and the U.S. Senate in 2000. He returned to elected office as Franklin County treasurer in 2002, won reelection in 2004, and was elected Ohio state treasurer in 2006.

In 2008, Cordray was elected Ohio attorney general in a special election to complete the remainder of an unexpired term. He lost his bid for a full term in 2010 to Republican Mike DeWine. President Barack Obama appointed him director of the CFPB in 2011 through a recess appointment, and the Senate confirmed him in 2013. Cordray resigned in 2017 to run for governor of Ohio but lost to DeWine in the 2018 election. As head of Federal Student Aid, he oversaw the administration of major student loan forgiveness initiatives that affected millions of borrowers. Cordray left the department after a chaotic rollout of changes to the FAFSA student aid application form.

== Early life and education ==
Cordray was born on May 3, 1959, in Columbus, Ohio, the middle child between brothers Frank Jr. and Jim, and was raised in Grove City, Ohio, where he attended public schools. At Grove City High School, Cordray became a champion on the high school quiz show In The Know and worked for minimum wage at McDonald's. He graduated from high school in 1977 as co-valedictorian of his class.

Cordray's first job in politics was as an intern for U.S. Senator John Glenn as a junior at Michigan State University's James Madison College. Cordray earned Phi Beta Kappa honors and graduated summa cum laude with a Bachelor of Arts degree in legal and political theory in 1981. As a Marshall Scholar, he earned a Master of Arts with first class honors in philosophy, politics and economics from Brasenose College, Oxford. Cordray was a member of the Oxford University Men's Basketball team and earned a Varsity Blue in 1983. He subsequently earned a Juris Doctor from the University of Chicago Law School, where he served as editor-in-chief of the University of Chicago Law Review.

== Early career ==
After starting work as a law clerk at the U.S. Supreme Court, Cordray returned to his high school to deliver the commencement speech for the class of 1988. He began his career by clerking for Judge Robert Bork of the U.S. Court of Appeals for the District of Columbia Circuit and for Justices Byron White and Anthony Kennedy of the Supreme Court of the United States. After clerking for Kennedy in 1989, Cordray was hired by the international law firm Jones Day to work in its Cleveland office.

From 1989 to at least 2000, Cordray taught various courses at the Ohio State University Moritz College of Law and Georgetown University.

=== Ohio House of Representatives (1991–1992) ===
In 1990, Cordray ran for an Ohio State House of Representatives seat, in the 33rd district (southern and western Franklin County), against six-term incumbent Republican Don Gilmore. Unopposed for the Democratic nomination, Cordray defeated Gilmore by an 18,573–11,944 (61–39%) margin.

=== 1992 congressional election ===
In 1991, the state Apportionment Board, controlled by a 3–2 Republican majority despite the party's 61–38 minority in the state House of Representatives, redrew state legislative districts following the results of the 1990 Census, in the hope of retaking control of the state House. The new boundaries created nine districts each with two resident incumbent Democrats, pairing Cordray with the 22-year incumbent Mike Stinziano. Unable to be elected in another district due to a one-year residency requirement, Cordray opted not to run for reelection.

Cordray ran for Ohio's 15th congressional district in the 1992 U.S. House of Representatives elections, and won the Democratic nomination over Bill Buckel by an 18,731–5,329 (78–22%) margin, following the withdrawal of another candidate, Dave Sommer. Cordray's platform included federal spending cuts, term limits for Congress and a line-item veto for the president. When Deborah Pryce, then a Franklin County municipal judge, announced that she would vote to support abortion rights, Linda Reidelbach entered the race as an independent. Thus, the general election was a three-way affair, with Pryce taking a plurality of 110,390 votes (44.1%), Cordray 94,907 (37.9%) and Reidelbach 44,906 (17.9%).

=== Ohio solicitor general (1993–1995) ===
While in private practice in 1993, Cordray co-wrote a legal brief for the Anti-Defamation League, in a campaign supported by Ohio's attorney general, for the reinstatement of Ohio's hate crime laws. This was considered by the U.S. Supreme Court, but not ruled on because of its similarity to a previous Wisconsin ruling.

In 1993, the government of Ohio created the office of state solicitor general to handle the state's appellate work. The state solicitor, appointed by the Ohio attorney general, is responsible for cases that are to be argued before the Ohio Supreme Court and the United States Supreme Court. Until 1998, the Solicitor worked without any support staff. Cordray, who had earlier worked for a summer in the office of the United States solicitor general, was the first Solicitor to be appointed, in September 1993. He held the position until he resigned after Ohio Attorney General Lee Fisher was defeated by Betty Montgomery in 1994. Cordray's subsequent cases before the Supreme Court included Wilson v. Layne (526 U.S. 603 (1999)) and Hanlon v. Berger (526 U.S. 808 (1999)). Though he lost his first case, Cordray won his second case, which garnered a substantial amount of media attention for its consideration of the constitutionality of media ride-alongs with police. Other cases included Household Credit Services v. Pfennig (541 U.S. 232 (2004)), Brown v. Legal Foundation of Washington (538 U.S. 216 (2003)), Demore v. Kim (538 U.S. 510 (2003)), and Groh v. Ramirez (540 U.S. 551 (2004)).

Cordray contested the Ku Klux Klan's right to erect a cross at the Ohio Statehouse after the state's Capitol Square Review and Advisory Board denied the Klan's request during the 1993 Christmas holiday. He argued that the symbolic meaning of the cross was different from the Christmas tree and menorah, which the state permits. The Klan prevailed in the 6th U.S. Circuit Court of Appeals on December 21, 1993, and erected a 10-foot (3 m) cross the next day. The same board denied the Klan a permit to rally on Martin Luther King Day (January 15, 1994) due to the group's failure to pay a $15,116 bill from its Oct 23 rally and its refusal to post a bond to cover expenses for the proposed rally. When the same 6th U.S. Circuit Court of Appeals overturned the decision to deny the 1994 permit, the state chose not to appeal. The following year the Klan again applied to erect a cross for the Christmas holiday season, and the 6th U.S. Circuit Court of Appeals concurred with the prior ruling. The United States Supreme Court did not agree to hear arguments on the topic until a few weeks after Cordray resigned from his solicitor general position. After his resignation in 1994, Cordray represented the federal government in the U.S. Supreme Court several times: two of Cordray's appearances before were by appointment of the Democratic Bill Clinton Justice Department and two were by the Republican George W. Bush Justice Department.

Cordray was granted a ruling by the Ohio Supreme Court that lower courts could not grant a stay of execution for a death row inmate. At the same time, Fisher, Cordray's boss, sought a referendum to mandate that appeals in death penalty cases be made directly to the Supreme Court. In 1994, the 6th U.S. Circuit Court of Appeals in Steffen v. Tate (39 F.3d 622 1994) limited death row inmates to a single federal appeal and said that federal courts cannot stay an execution if the case is still in a state court.

In early 1996, Cordray was elected to the Ohio Democratic Party Central Committee from the 15th district by a 5,472–1,718 margin over John J. Kulewicz. From 1995 to 2007, Cordray was a sole practitioner and Of Counsel to Kirkland & Ellis.

In late 1996, Cordray, who was in private practice at the time, was a leading contender and finalist for a United States attorney position during the second term of the Clinton administration, along with Kent Markus and Sharon Zealey. Zealey was eventually selected.

=== 1998 Ohio Attorney General election ===
During the 1998 election for Ohio attorney general, Cordray ran unopposed in the Democratic primary but was defeated, 62%–38%, by one-term Republican incumbent Betty Montgomery.

=== 2000 U.S. Senate election ===
Cordray entered the U.S. Senate elections in a race that began as a three-way contest for the Democratic nomination to oppose first-term Republican incumbent Mike DeWine. The three-way race was unusual since the three candidates (Cordray, Rev. Marvin McMickle, and Ted Celeste) were encouraged to campaign together in order to promote name recognition, conserve resources and lessen infighting. Ohio Democratic party leaders believed Cordray was better suited for an Ohio Supreme Court seat and urged him to drop out of the Senate race. Despite the Ohio Democrats not endorsing any candidate in the primary election, the entry of Dan Radakovich as a fourth competitor, and the anticipated entry of former Mayor of Cincinnati and television personality Jerry Springer, Cordray persisted in his campaign. Celeste, the younger brother of former Ohio governor Dick Celeste, won with 369,772 votes. He was trailed by McMickle (the only black Senate candidate in the country in 2000) with 204,811 votes, Cordray with 200,157, and Radakovich with 69,002.

=== Franklin county treasurer (2002–2007) ===
Cordray was unopposed in the May 7, 2002, primary election for the Democratic nomination as Franklin County treasurer. He defeated Republican incumbent Wade Steen, who had been appointed in May 2001 to replace Bobbie M. Hall. The election was close, unofficially 131,199–128,677 (50.5%–49.5%), official margin of victory 3,232. Cordray was the first Democrat to hold the position since 1977, and because he was filling Hall's unexpired term, he assumed office on December 9, 2002, instead of after January 1.

The Franklin County Republican party made no endorsement in the 2004 election, but Republican Jim Timko challenged Cordray. Cordray defeated him and was elected to a four-year term by a 272,593–153,625 (64%–36%) margin.

As Franklin County treasurer Cordray focused on four major initiatives: collection of delinquent tax revenue through a tax lien certificate sale, creation of a land bank, personal finance education, and the development of a community outreach program. He managed a portfolio that averaged $650 million and consistently beat its benchmarks, and set new records for delinquent tax collection in Franklin County, which was the only Ohio county with a AAA credit rating. Cordray also served as president of the Board of Revision and chair of the Budget Commission. In 2005, he was named the national County Leader of the Year by American City & County magazine.

== Later career ==
=== Ohio treasurer (2007–2009) ===
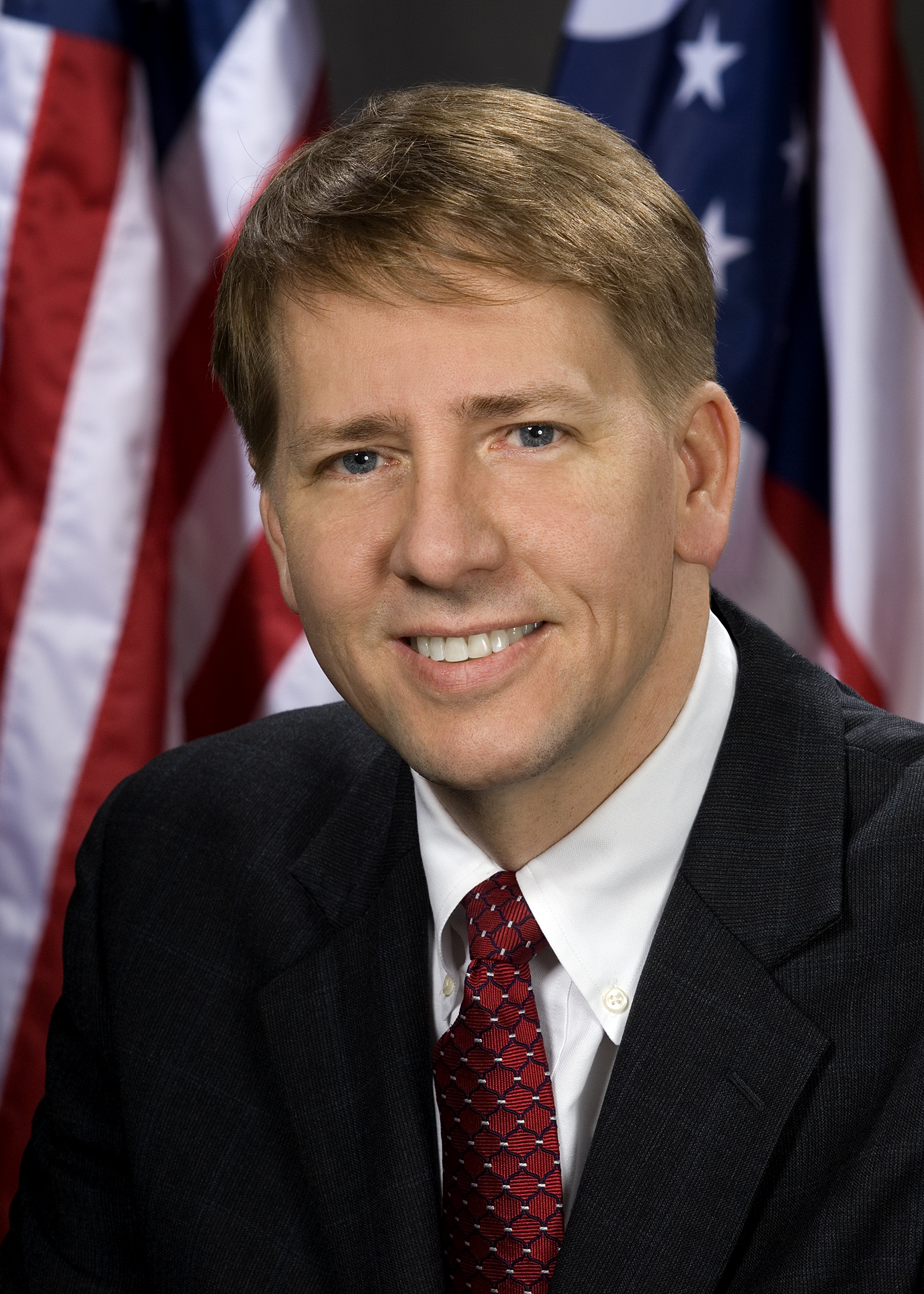
Official portrait, 2007

In the 2006 Democratic party primary election for Ohio treasurer, Cordray was set to face Montgomery County treasurer Hugh Quill, but Quill withdrew before the election. He defeated Republican nominee Sandra O'Brien for state treasurer in the 2006 election with 58% of the vote. Cordray succeeded Jennette Bradley in a near-statewide sweep by the Democratic Party. He noted that when he assumed statewide office, Ohio was challenged with restoring public trust after the misdeeds of former Governor Bob Taft. Of what would be required to follow Ohio Attorney General Marc Dann and his interim successor Nancy Rogers, he said, "we have been patiently rebuilding the public trust [in the state government] and I think it would be a very similar task there in the attorney general's office."

=== Ohio attorney general (2009–2011) ===
Cordray announced his 2008 candidacy for Ohio state attorney general on June 11, 2008. Cordray was endorsed by Ohio Governor Ted Strickland. The vacancy in the office of the attorney general was created by the May 14, 2008, resignation of Marc Dann, who was embroiled in a sex scandal. Several leading Republican party contenders such as Montgomery, Jim Petro, DeWine, Maureen O'Connor, and Rob Portman declined to enter the race. Cordray's opponents in the race were Michael Crites (Republican), and Robert M. Owens (Independent). Cordray had a large financial advantage over his opponents, with approximately 30 times as much campaign financing as Crites. Crites's campaign strategies included attempts to link Cordray with Dann—an association The Columbus Dispatch called into question—and promoting himself as having more years of prosecutorial experience. Cordray asserted that he managed the state's money safely despite the turbulence of the 2008 financial crisis.

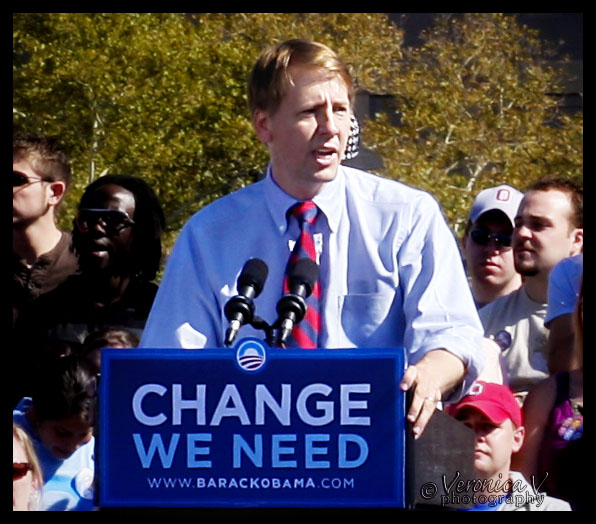
Cordray campaigning for Barack Obama on October 13, 2008, in Columbus, Ohio

Ohio statewide offices are regularly contested every four years in the midterm election years. 2008 was a Class 2 senatorial election year, and Ohio is a state with class 1 and class 3 senators. Thus the attorney general race was the only statewide non-presidential race in the 2008 election aside from contests for two seats on the Ohio Supreme Court. Cordray defeated Crites by a vote of 2,890,953 (57%) to 1,956,252 (38%).

In July 2009, Denny Chin, a judge on the United States District Court for the Southern District of New York, granted lead plaintiff status to a group of five public pension funds for investor class-action lawsuits against the Bank of America Corporation over its acquisition of Merrill. The claim was that Bank of America misled investors about Merrill's financial well-being before the January 1, 2009, acquisition despite awareness that Merrill was headed toward a significant loss that amounted to $15.84 billion in its fourth quarter. The suit also alleged that significant bonus payments were concealed.

The curious dealings led to congressional hearings about why the merger commenced without any disclosures. In September 2009, Cordray, on behalf of Ohio's largest public employee pension funds (State Teachers Retirement System of Ohio and the Ohio Public Employees Retirement System), the Teacher Retirement System of Texas and pension funds from Sweden and the Netherlands, filed suit alleging that Bank of America, its directors and four executives (Bank of America Chief Executive Kenneth Lewis, Bank of America Chief Financial Officer Joe Price, accounting chief Neil Cotty and former Merrill chairman and CEO John Thain) acted to conceal Merrill's growing losses from shareholders who voted to approve the deal.

Before the filing, the five funds had filed individual complaints, but the September filing of an amended complaint joined the actions, with Cordray representing the lead plaintiff. The amended complaint included details about conversations and communications between Bank of America and Merrill Lynch executives that were revealed in media reports, congressional testimony and investigations by the Securities and Exchange Commission. The filing was an attempt to recover losses endured when Bank of America's share price fell after the transaction. The damages were sought from Bank of America, individual executives, and the bank's board of directors, including insurers that cover directors' legal liabilities. Among the specifics of the claim were that Bank of America agreed to allow Merrill Lynch to pay as much as $5.8 billion in undisclosed year-end discretionary bonuses to executives and employees and that Bank of America and Merrill Lynch executives were aware of billions of dollars in losses Merrill Lynch suffered in the two months before the merger vote but failed to disclose them.

In April 2010, Cordray reached a $1 billion settlement with American International Group (AIG), one of four remaining named defendants (along with Marsh McLennan, Hartford Financial Services and Chubb Corp.), in a 2007 antitrust case regarding business practices between 2001 and 2004. The settlement was divided among 26 Ohio universities, cities, and schools. Zurich Financial Services settled in 2006. Cordray said he believed that Marsh was the organizing company for the illegal practices and that a trial could commence in 2011. AIG admitted no wrongdoing and said the settlement was to avoid risks and prolonged expenses.

In November 2010, Cordray lost his reelection bid to former U.S. senator Mike DeWine, by a vote of 1,821,414 (48%) to 1,772,728 (46%). Cordray was repeatedly mentioned as a potential 2014 candidate for governor of Ohio, but he declined to run after being confirmed to a five-year term to head the CFPB.

=== Consumer Financial Protection Bureau (2012–2017) ===
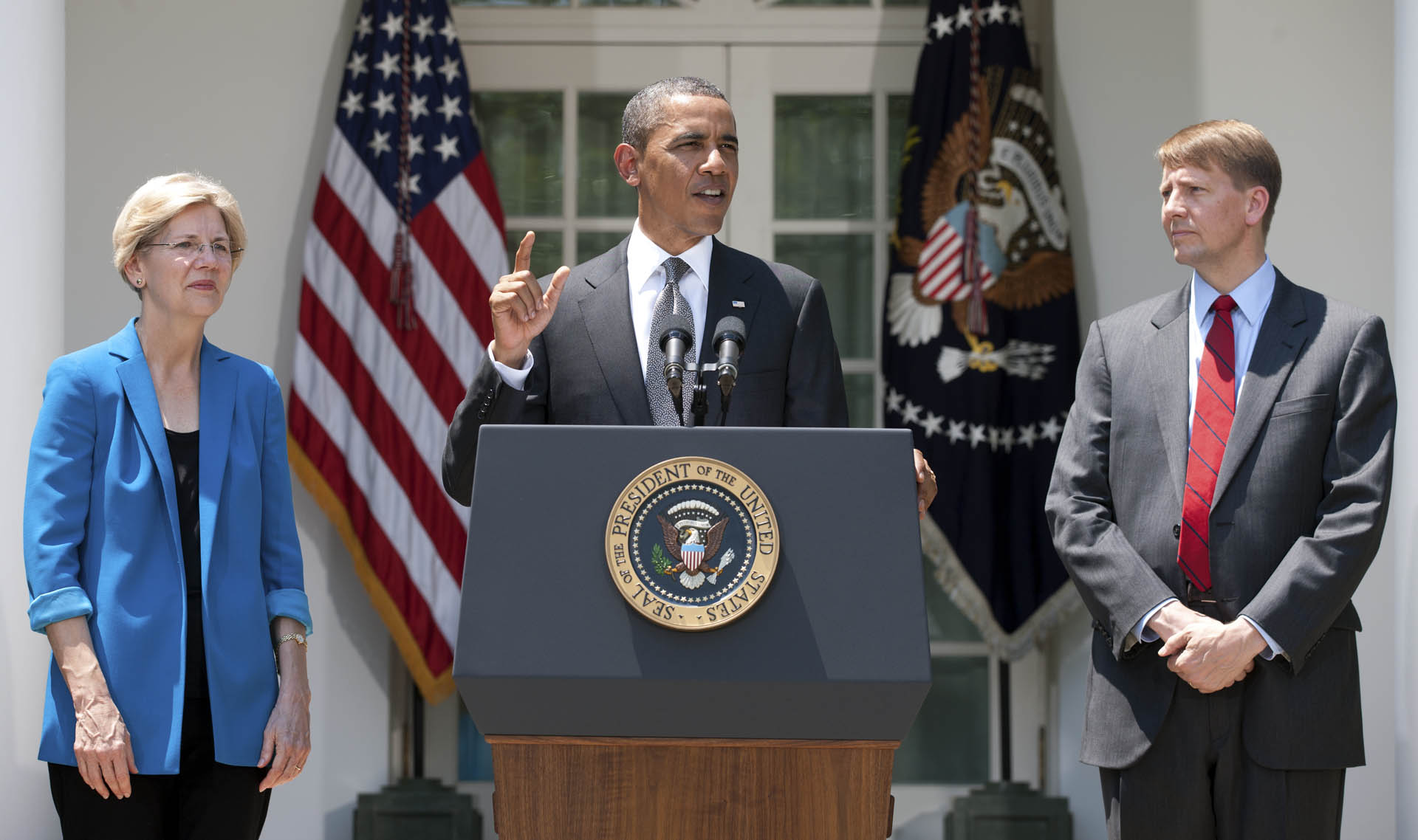
President Obama announcing the nomination of Cordray as the first director of the Consumer Financial Protection Bureau on July 18, 2011

In December 2010, Special Advisor to President Barack Obama Elizabeth Warren selected Cordray to lead the enforcement arm of the newly created United States Consumer Financial Protection Bureau (CFPB), saying, "Richard Cordray has the vision and experience to help us build a team that ensures every lender in the marketplace is playing by the rules." In announcing his appointment to this position Cordray also said that he intended to run for statewide office in Ohio again in 2014. Cordray said his appointment gave him a chance to resume "in many ways doing on a 50-state basis the things I cared most about as a state attorney general, with a more robust and a more comprehensive authority".

On July 17, 2011, Cordray was selected as the head of the entire CFPB, but his nomination was immediately in jeopardy because 44 Senate Republicans had previously vowed to derail any nominee in order to push for a decentralized structure to the organization. This was part of a pattern of conflict between Republicans in the Senate and the Obama administration that had led to record numbers of blocked and failed nominations. Four days later, Senator Richard Shelby wrote an op-ed article for The Wall Street Journal affirming continued opposition (that went back to a May 5 letter to Obama) to a centralized structure and saying that, like the Securities Exchange Commission and Federal Deposit Insurance Corporation, the CFPB should have an executive board. Politico interpreted Shelby's statements as making Cordray's nomination "dead on arrival". In October, as the nomination remained on hold, the National Association of Attorneys General endorsed Cordray. On December 8, 2011, the Senate failed to secure cloture on Cordray's nomination. The final vote was 53–45, with 50 out of 51 Democrats voting for cloture, and 45 out of 47 Republicans voting against.

In January 2012, Obama gave Cordray a recess appointment to the post, bypassing the Senate, which had been holding, over the holiday recess, pro forma sessions of the Senate (gaveling in and gaveling out minutes later, without any legislative business being conducted) in order to block Obama from making a recess appointment. The White House's position was that the Senate was effectively in recess, and therefore that Obama was empowered to make a recess appointment; this move was criticized by Republican senators, who argued that Congress had not officially been in recess, and that Obama did not have the authority to bypass Senate approval.

The recess appointment's validity was challenged in court, and in June 2014, in NLRB v. Noel Canning, the Supreme Court unanimously vacated recess appointments made while the Senate was in pro forma session, determining that the Senate was not in recess at the time of the appointments. This decision did not affect Cordray because, almost two years after the recess appointment, he had been confirmed by the Senate.

On January 24, 2013, Obama renominated Cordray as CFPB director. Senate Republicans opposed his nomination, but amid a July 2013 push by Senate Democrats to eliminate the filibuster for all executive-branch nominees, senators struck a deal to pave the way for a final, up-or-down vote. The Senate voted 71–29 on July 16, 2013, to invoke cloture on Cordray's nomination, and confirmed Cordray in a 66–34 vote the same day.

Under Cordray, the CFPB grew to be a 1,600-person agency, and he was called to testify before Congress more than 40 times. During his tenure, the CFPB developed new mortgage lending rules that are credited with bringing lasting stability to markets after the 2008 subprime mortgage crisis. The CFPB also implemented reforms to the credit card market that lowered consumer costs and promoted transparency by reducing hidden fees and charges. It imposed large fines on banks for credit card add-on fees and brought the first major enforcement action against Wells Fargo. While Cordray served as director, the CFPB returned nearly $12 billion in relief for 29 million consumers. In this position, he also served on the Financial Stability Oversight Council, the Board of Governors for the Federal Deposit Insurance Corporation, and as vice chair of the Financial Literacy and Education Commission.

Republican groups including American Rising Squared and Congressman Jeb Hensarling filed complaints that Cordray had violated the Hatch Act by considering a run for governor of Ohio while serving as the director of the CFPB, but the United States Office of Special Counsel cleared Cordray of any wrongdoing.

Cordray has said that after President Trump was inaugurated, Trump and Office of Management and Budget Director Mick Mulvaney worked to undermine Cordray and the CFPB. On November 15, 2017, Cordray announced his resignation as director of the CFPB, sparking a legal dispute over who would succeed him as acting director.

=== 2018 Ohio gubernatorial campaign ===
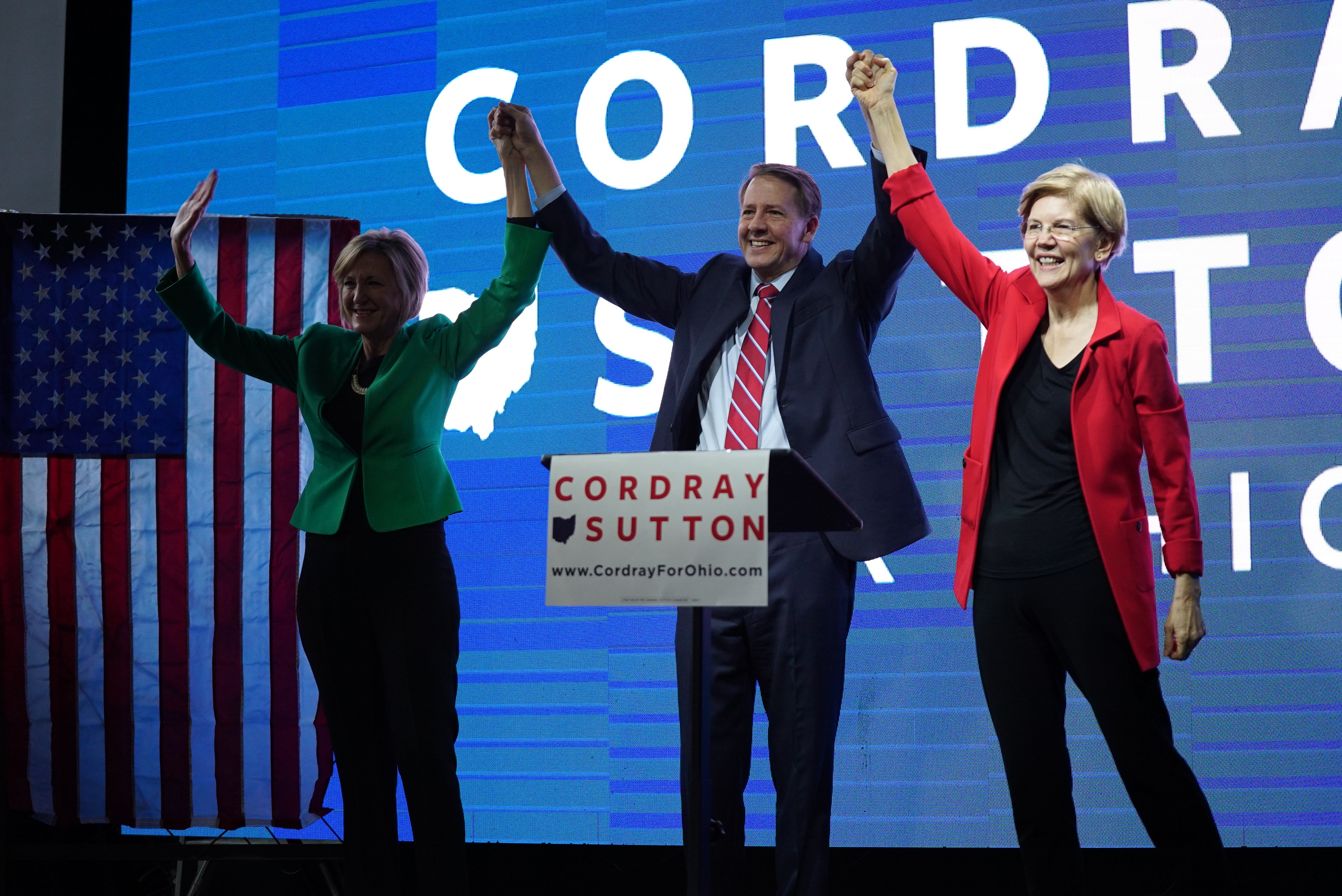
Cordray at a 2018 campaign event with running mate Betty Sutton (left) and Senator Elizabeth Warren

On December 5, 2017, Cordray announced his candidacy for governor of Ohio in the 2018 Ohio gubernatorial election. He chose former U.S. Representative Betty Sutton as his running mate. Cordray won the Democratic primary on May 8, 2018, with 62% of the vote, and faced Republican challenger and Ohio Attorney General Mike DeWine in the general election. On August 1, 2018, former president Barack Obama endorsed Cordray for governor. DeWine won the November 6 general election by a vote of 2,235,825 (50%) to 2,070,046 (47%).

=== Federal student aid (2021–2024) ===
On May 3, 2021, Cordray was appointed the Department of Education's Chief Operating Officer of Federal Student Aid. In this role, he led an agency of 1,400 employees that is the nation's largest provider of student financial aid. Each year, FSA disburses grants, loans, and work-study funds that help over 10 million students access higher education. It is also responsible for managing a portfolio of $1.6 trillion in student loan debt owed by 45 million borrowers. During Cordray's tenure, FSA made improvements to existing loan forgiveness programs that resulted in canceling $127 billion in student loan debt for 3.6 million families.

Starting on March 13, 2020, the Trump administration instituted a payment pause on all FSA loans due to the COVID-19 pandemic. Debt-collection activities resumed on September 30, 2023, for 28 million student loan borrowers. To protect borrowers during this transition, FSA implemented a framework to increase accountability for student loan servicers. After the first three months of the return to repayment, the share of the federal portfolio making payments had returned to approximately the same level as in the month before the pandemic.

During Cordray's tenure, FSA reinvigorated various loan forgiveness programs, such as Public Service Loan Forgiveness (PSLF) and Borrower Defense to Repayment. At the outset of the Biden administration, only 7,000 public servants had received loan forgiveness through PSLF, despite many more having made their payments for the statutory term of ten years, while few if any Borrower Defense claims had been approved for students who had been misled by failing schools. In 2022, President Biden announced a broad program of debt relief for student loan borrowers, and FSA spent several months building a program that eventually saw eight million applicants. This debt relief program was enjoined by the lower federal courts and in June 2023 invalidated by the U.S. Supreme Court.

Despite the failure of Biden's initiative, FSA continued to grant loan forgiveness under other programs, including PSLF, Borrower Defense, Temporary and Permanent Disability, and the new SAVE plan for income-driven repayment. By the end of Cordray's tenure, FSA had canceled $175 billion in student loan debt for 4.8 million Americans.

On December 30, 2023, a new version of the Free Application for Federal Student Aid (FAFSA) was released. It was a culmination of changes approved by Congress in 2019 and 2020. The FAFSA determines eligibility for federal Pell Grants, federal student loans, and financial aid provided by colleges. The rollout was plagued by problems that created major delays for students planning to go to college. FAFSA completions among high school seniors were down 36% compared with the previous class, according to the National College Attainment Network. Further problems on the back end and a last-minute change to the aid calculation meant that colleges received no FAFSA information until March, and many forms had to be reprocessed because of errors in the data. On April 26, 2024, Cordray said he would not continue in his role for another three-year term, but would stay on through June to help with the transition.

== Personal life ==
On July 11, 1992, Cordray married Margaret "Peggy" Cordray, a law professor at Capital University Law School. The Cordrays have twins, a daughter and son, and reside near Grove City, Ohio. His father retired as an Orient Developmental Center program director for intellectually disabled residents after 43 years of service. His mother, Ruth Cordray, from Dayton, Ohio, died in 1980. She was a social worker, teacher and founder of Ohio's first foster grandparent program for individuals with developmental disabilities.

Cordray carried the Olympic Flame through Findlay, Ohio, as part of the nationwide torch relay to the 1996 Summer Olympics in Atlanta, Georgia, and has served as a member of the Advisory Board for the Friends of the Homeless and part of Al Gore's select group known as Leadership '98. In 2020, Cordray wrote the book Watchdog: How Protecting Consumers Can Save Our Families, Our Economy, and Our Democracy, about his years leading the CFPB.

=== Appearances on Jeopardy! ===
Cordray is an undefeated five-time champion and Tournament of Champions semifinalist on Jeopardy! In 1987, he won $45,303 from the show, which he used to pay law school debt and taxes and to buy a used car. The total winnings came from $40,303 in prize money during his five-contest streak and $5,000 for a first-round win in the Tournament of Champions. Cordray's campaign for public office in 1990 precluded him from participating in the Super Jeopardy! elimination tournament of champions, as ABC, the network that carried the tournament, had a policy against political contestants appearing on the show (excluding Celebrity Jeopardy!). But he did compete in the Battle of the Decades tournament, appearing in the show aired February 5, 2014, and finishing second to aerospace consultant Tom Nosek. Because of his duties as a federal employee, Cordray turned down the $5,000 prize for that appearance.

== See also ==
- List of law clerks for the first seat of the Supreme Court of the United States
- List of law clerks for the sixth seat of the Supreme Court of the United States

== Notes ==
Ohio House of Representatives
| Preceded by Don Gilmore | Member of the Ohio House of Representatives from the 33rd district January 7, 1991 – December 31, 1992 | Succeeded by Priscilla Mead |
Party political offices
| Preceded by Lee Fisher | Democratic nominee for Attorney General of Ohio; 1998 | Succeeded by Leigh Herington |
| Preceded by Mary Boyle | Democratic nominee for Treasurer of Ohio; 2006 | Succeeded by Kevin Boyce |
| Preceded by Marc Dann | Democratic nominee for Attorney General of Ohio; 2008, 2010 | Succeeded by David Pepper |
| Preceded by Ed FitzGerald | Democratic nominee for Governor of Ohio; 2018 | Succeeded by Nan Whaley |
Political offices
| Preceded by Wade Steen | Treasurer of Franklin County; December 9, 2002 – January 8, 2007 | Succeeded by Ed Leonard |
| Preceded by Jennette Bradley | Treasurer of Ohio; January 8, 2007 – January 7, 2009 | Succeeded by Kevin Boyce |
Legal offices
| New office | Solicitor General of Ohio; September 19, 1993 – January 6, 1995 | Succeeded by Jeffrey Sutton |
| Preceded by Nancy Rogers | Attorney General of Ohio; January 8, 2009 – January 10, 2011 | Succeeded by Mike DeWine |
Government offices
| Preceded by Raj Date as Special Advisor | Director of the Consumer Financial Protection Bureau; January 4, 2012 – November 24, 2017 | Succeeded by Kathy Kraninger |
| Preceded by Mark Brown | Chief Operating Officer of Federal Student Aid; May 3, 2021 – July 2024 | Succeeded by Denise Carter; Acting |
