= 2008 Ohio Attorney General special election =

- November 4, 2008
- Turnout: 61.4%

Nominee	Richard Cordray	Mike Crites
Party	Democratic	Republican
Popular vote	2,890,953	1,956,252
Percentage	56.76%	38.41%
- Cordray: 40-50% 50–60% 60–70% 70–80% 80–90% Crites: 40–50% 50–60% 60–70%
Attorney General before election
Nancy Rogers
Democratic
Elected Attorney General
Richard Cordray
Democratic

The 2008 Ohio Attorney General special election was held on November 4, 2008, concurrently with the Presidential Election as well as elections to the United States House of Representatives. Incumbent Attorney General Marc Dann, who was elected in 2006, resigned on May 14, 2008 due to various scandals, thus triggering a special election. Governor Ted Strickland appointed Nancy H. Rogers to the position, but she announced she would not run to complete the rest of Marc's term. On June 11, 2008, Ohio State Treasurer Richard Cordray announced his candidacy for the election. He was challenged in the general election by former United States Attorney for the Southern District of Ohio Michael Crites. Cordray won in a landslide winning 56% of the vote to Crites' 38%.

As of 2026, this was the last time a Democratic candidate carried the counties of Licking, Fairfield, Richland, Seneca, Huron, Madison, Medina, Pickaway, Marion, and Crawford in a statewide race. This was additionally the last time a Democrat was elected Attorney General of Ohio until 2026.

== Background ==
Incumbent Democratic Attorney General Marc Dann resigned the office on May 14, 2008, due to many scandals including an Extramarital affair and many reports of sexual harassment, as well as condemnation from many fellow Ohio Democrats. As such incumbent Democratic governor Ted Strickland appointed Dean of Ohio State University Moritz College of Law Nancy H. Rogers to the position. Serving since May 28, 2008, she announced that she would not seek election to finish Dann's term. Incumbent treasurer Richard Cordray, who previously ran for Attorney General announced his candidacy for the office.

== Democratic primary ==
=== Candidates ===
==== Declared ====
- Richard Cordray, Incumbent Ohio State Treasurer, former Ohio House of Representatives member from the 33rd district, former Treasurer of Franklin County, former Solicitor General of Ohio, nominee for OH-15 in 1992, nominee for Attorney General in 1998, and candidate for U.S. Senate in 2000.

== Republican primary ==
=== Candidates ===
==== Declared ====
- Mike Crites, former United States Attorney for the Southern District of Ohio

== General election ==
=== Results ===
In the concurrently held Presidential Election Democratic candidate Barack Obama carried the state by 4.5%. Cordray carried the majority of counties in the Appalachia parts of the state and got high support from suburban counties of Columbus. Cordray also did well in the right-leaning Hamilton County home to Cincinnati. As of 2022, this election remains one of the best performances for a Democrat in Ohio in the 21st century with Cordray winning by 18 points, only being beaten by Ted Strickland's performance in the 2006 Governor election.

2008 Ohio Attorney General special election
Party	Candidate	Votes	%	±%
Democratic	Richard Cordray	2,890,953	56.76	+4.15%
Republican	Mike Crites	1,956,252	38.41	−8.98%
Independent	Robert Owens	246,002	4.83	N/A
Total votes		5,093,207	100.00	N/A
Democratic hold				

== See also ==
- 2008 United States elections
