= Kathy Kraninger =

American government official (born 1974)

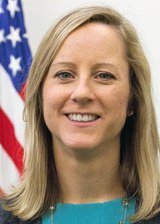

2nd Director of the Consumer Financial Protection Bureau
- In office December 11, 2018 – January 20, 2021
- President: Donald Trump
- Deputy: Brian Johnson; Leonard Chanin (acting); Thomas Pahl
- Preceded by: Richard Cordray
- Succeeded by: Rohit Chopra

Personal details
- Born: Kathleen Laura Kraninger; December 28, 1974 (age 51) Pittsburgh, Pennsylvania U.S.
- Party: Republican
- Education: Marquette University (BS); Georgetown University (JD)

Kathleen Laura “Kathy” Kraninger (born December 28, 1974) is an American government official who served as director of the Consumer Financial Protection Bureau (CFPB) from December 11, 2018, until her resignation on January 20, 2021. Before that, she served in the White House Office of Management and Budget during the Trump administration.

Before her appointment to head the CFPB by President Trump, Kraninger had no experience in financial industry regulation or in consumer protection matters. During her tenure as CFPB head, Kraninger loosened rules on payday lenders, as well as sided with the Trump administration's argument that the CFPB had too much independence.

== Early life and education ==
Kraninger was born in Pittsburgh, Pennsylvania and raised in Chagrin Falls, Ohio. She attended Marquette University from 1993 to 1997. While attending college, she interned in the office of then-United States Representative Sherrod Brown. In 1997, she graduated magna cum laude from Marquette with a Bachelor of Science degree in political science and history. After college, she was a Peace Corps volunteer in Ukraine from September 1997 to November 1999.

After returning from Ukraine, she studied from 2003 to 2007 at Georgetown University Law Center, where she obtained her Juris Doctor, attending law school at night while working during the day.

== Career ==
=== Office of Management and Budget (2017–2018) ===
Kraninger served as an associate director in the Office of Management and Budget in the Trump administration. As an associate program director, she oversaw $250 billion in funding for seven cabinet departments and other federal agencies, including the United States Departments of Commerce, Homeland Security, Justice, Housing and Urban Development, and Treasury.

=== Consumer Financial Protection Bureau (2018–2021) ===
On June 16, 2018, White House Deputy Press Secretary Lindsay Walters announced that President Donald Trump would nominate Kraninger as Director of the Consumer Financial Protection Bureau, a position then held by OMB Director Mick Mulvaney. Consumer groups and Senate conservatives criticized her nomination for her perceived lack of qualifications. She had no experience in financial industry regulation or in consumer protection matters. Senator Elizabeth Warren threatened to block the nomination over Kraninger's role in the Trump administration's family separation policy, which drew criticism for separating migrant children from their parents at the U.S./Mexico border. As part of her role in the OMB, Kraninger would have likely been involved in coordinating policies such as the family separation policy. Public records show that Kraninger held nearly two dozen meetings with multiple top-level officials from DHS, ICE and USCIS leading up to the family separation policy's implementation. During the confirmation hearings, Kraninger declined to answer questions about her involvement in the family separation policy.

Kraninger was confirmed on December 6, 2018, in a 50–49 party-line vote.

In 2019, Kraninger sided with the Trump administration's Department of Justice in arguing that the CFPB had too much independence. The Trump administration had argued since 2017 that the CFPB was unconstitutional. Before she took over, the CFPB had defended itself from the Trump administration's claims of unconstitutionality. During her confirmation hearing in 2018, Kraninger had said that it would be up to Congress and the courts to resolve whether the CFPB was unconstitutional.

In July 2020, Kraninger instituted a new rule at the CFPB whereby payday lenders would no longer have to check whether prospective borrowers can afford to repay high-interest loans.

Kraninger resigned from her position on January 20, 2021, at the request of the incoming Biden administration.

== Awards ==
In 2014, Marquette University awarded Kraninger its Young Alumna of the Year Award. In 2009 she was granted the Meritorious Public Service Award by the United States Coast Guard.

Government offices
Preceded by Richard Cordray	Director of the Consumer Financial Protection Bureau; 2018–2021	Succeeded by Rohit Chopra
