= RealtySouth =

Alabama-based real estate company

- Industry: Real estate
- Founded: 1955; 70 years ago
- Headquarters: Birmingham, Alabama, United States
- Key people: Richard Grimes (President and CEO)
- Brands: RealtySouth, TitleSouth, Home Service Lending, RealtySouth Relocation Services, InsuranceSouth
- Parent: Berkshire Hathaway
- Website: realtysouth.com

RealtySouth is an Alabama-based real estate company comprising over 1,000 sales associates in 27 locations across Alabama.

== History ==
RealtySouth was formed in 1955 by the merger of Johnson-Rast & Hays, Brigham-Williams, First Real Estate, and Ray & Company.

In 2002, it was acquired by HomeServices of America, a holding of Berkshire Hathaway.

In 2014, the company was ordered to pay a $500,000 fine for alleged violations of the Real Estate Settlement Procedures Act (RESPA), with the specific claim that RealtySouth improperly urged, and in some cases, required, customers to use RealtySouth's own title insurer, TitleSouth. While not admitting any wrongdoing, RealtySouth agreed to a consent order requiring them to pay the $500,000 fine and to alter their customer paperwork to allow for a more clear choice of title insurers.
