= Onity Group =

Provider of mortgage loan servicing

- Type: Public
- Traded as: NYSE: ONIT; Russell 2000 Component
- Industry: Financial services (Mortgage)
- Founded: February 1988
- Headquarters: West Palm Beach, Florida
- Key people: Glen Messina (Chair, President and CEO)
- Revenue: ▲$18.0 billion
- Net income: ▲$58.7 million (Q3 2014)
- Number of employees: 6400 (December 2018)
- Website: onitygroup.com

Onity Group, formerly Ocwen, is a provider of residential and commercial mortgage loan servicing, special servicing, and asset management services, which has been described as "debt collectors, collecting monthly principal and interest from homeowners".

== History and operations ==
Onity Group was founded as Ocwen Financial Corporation in 1988 by William Erbey. The company is headquartered in West Palm Beach, Florida, with additional offices in Mount Laurel, NJ, Rancho Cordova, California, and St. Croix, U.S. Virgin Islands. It also has support operations in the Philippines and India. On June 10, 2024, Ocwen rebranded as Onity Group. Onity's Slogan is "We Get It Done."

== Corporate affairs ==
Onity is licensed to service mortgage loans in all 50 states, the District of Columbia and two U.S. territories. Onity has been servicing residential mortgage loans since 1988 and subprime mortgage loans since 1994.

As of 2010, Ocwen's subprime servicing volume was $56 billion, ranking it fourth in subprime servicing behind American Home Servicing ($78 billion), Bank of America/Countrywide ($82 billion), and Chase Home Finance ($90 billion). As of December 31, 2011, Ocwen had serviced 671,623 residential loans with an aggregate unpaid principal balance (UPB) of $102.2 billion. As of February 26, 2014, with rights to service a mortgage portfolio of over $500 billion in UPB, it is the biggest non-bank servicer of U.S. mortgages.

=== Acquisitions ===
In June 2013, Ocwen Financial (OCN), the nation's fourth-largest mortgage servicer, bought the rights to service $78 billion in mortgages from OneWest Bank, the former IndyMac Bancorp.

In September 2010, Ocwen, through Ocwen Loan Servicing, LLC (OLS), a wholly owned subsidiary of Ocwen, acquired the U.S. non-prime mortgage servicing business of Barclays Bank PLC, known as HomEq servicing. While the transaction did not result in the transfer of ownership of any legal entities, OLS acquired the mortgage servicing rights (MSRs) and associated servicer advances of the business as well as the servicing platforms based in Sacramento, California, and Raleigh, North Carolina, for an initial aggregate purchase price of $1.2 billion. With the close of the HomEq acquisition, Ocwen boarded onto its servicing platform approximately 134,000 residential mortgage loans with an aggregate UPB of approximately $22.4 billion.

In September 2011, Ocwen completed its acquisition of outstanding partnership interests of Litton Loan Servicing LP and certain interest-only servicing securities previously owned by Goldman Sachs & Co. from Goldman Sachs. Following this $247.2 million worth acquisition, Ocwen became the largest subprime mortgage servicer in the U.S. The Litton acquisition increased Ocwen's servicing portfolio by 245,000 residential mortgage loans with an aggregate UPB of approximately $38.6 billion. Litton Loan Servicing signed a consent order over their loan servicing practices.

In April 2012, Ocwen closed on the purchase of approximately $22 billion of mortgage servicing rights from Saxon Mortgage Services, a unit of Morgan Stanley. Saxon Mortgage signed consent orders with federal regulators because of its mortgage loan servicing practices.

In June 2012, Ocwen completed its purchase of Aurora Bank's commercial servicing rights portfolio.

In October 2012, Ocwen announced plans to buy Homeward Residential Holdings, Inc. from WL Ross & Co. for $750 million. Homeward consisted of the mortgage servicing from American Home Mortgage and Option One Mortgage. The acquisition was finalized on December 27, 2012. As a result of the acquisition, the Jacksonville, Florida, site was closed, laying off all 370 employees, and 325 employees at Homeward's Coppell, Texas, location were laid off.

In October 2012, Ocwen also partnered with Walter Investment Management Corp. to place the winning $3 billion bid for Residential Capital's mortgage-servicing and origination assets at a bankruptcy auction. Additionally, the company entered into an agreement with Genworth Financial Corp. to acquire Genworth Financial Home Equity Access Inc. for $22 million.

In February 2012, Gleacher & Co. announced the sale of its mortgage unit ClearPoint to Ocwen.

In June 2013, Ocwen Financial Corp. (OCN), a provider of loan and asset-management services, agreed to buy contracts to handle payment collections on about $78 billion of mortgages from OneWest Bank FSB for $2.53 billion.

On February 27, 2018, Ocwen Financial Corporation entered into definitive agreement to acquire PHH Corporation for $360 million.

On October 4, 2018, Ocwen Financial Corporation officially acquired PHH Corporation for approximately $360 million. Along with the acquisition, Ocwen announced Glen A. Messina would become the president and CEO and a member of Ocwen's board of directors.

=== Status of Ocwen due to merger with PHH Mortgage ===
On June 6, 2019, Ocwen Financial Corporation/Ocwen Loan Servicing is merging all loans that are currently serviced by Ocwen Loan Servicing into PHH Mortgage. The merger also allows more for both of the companies because PHH Mortgage does do actual new mortgages and refinance rather than Ocwen before just doing servicing of loans.

On October 4, 2018, Ocwen Financial completed its acquisition of PHH Corporation and is now a wholly owned subsidiary of Ocwen Financial Corp.

=== Home Affordable Modification Program ===
Ocwen was a participant in the U.S. Treasury Department's Home Affordable Modification Program (HAMP), which was designed to use loan modifications to help homeowners facing foreclosure. Ocwen early on posted relative success in converting trial loan modifications to permanent ones, in part because it relied on verified income statements from borrowers rather than stated ones.

In August 2010, Ocwen enacted a Shared Appreciation Modification (SAM) program that reduces a qualified delinquent borrower's principal to 95% of the home's current market value, but requires the homeowner to later share 25% of the home's appreciation with the investors when the home is eventually sold or refinanced. In 2011, Ocwen reported that it had modified more than 200,000 troubled loans since the mortgage crisis began in the mid-2000s.

=== Altisource spinoff ===
Altisource Portfolio Solutions S.A.
- Traded as: Nasdaq: ASPS; Russell 2000 Index component

In August 2009, Ocwen completed the distribution of its Ocwen Solutions (OS) line of business via the spinoff of a separate publicly traded company called Altisource (Nasdaq: ASPS). Ocwen claimed that the Separation has allowed it to focus on its core servicing business and to respond better to initiatives and market challenges.

OS consisted of the former unsecured collections business, residential fee-based loan processing businesses and technology platforms as well as the international commercial loan servicing business conducted through Global Servicing Solutions, LLC (GSS) and the equity investment in BMS Holdings (subsequently changed to BHI Liquidation). With the exception of interests in GSS and BMS Holdings, Inc., Ocwen distributed the assets, liabilities, and operations of OS in the spinoff. Altisource specializes in Real Estate Owned (REO) and related business activities.

=== Home Loan Servicing Solutions spinoff ===
Ocwen Financial Corporation spun off Home Loan Servicing Solutions (HLSS) in 2010. Founded by Ocwen Financial Corporation's Executive Chairman William Erbey, HLSS was created to acquire mortgage servicing assets including servicing rights, rights to fees, and other income from servicing loans.

In February 2011, HLSS announced its plan for an initial public offering. The company raised $186.2 million in its February 2012 IPO and is traded on NASDAQ.

== Employees ==
As of September 30, 2018, Ocwen reported as having 6,400 employees worldwide, of which approximately 4,300 are employed in their India operations centers, and 500 in the Philippines. Their operations in India and the Philippines primarily provide internal support services, principally to their loan servicing business and corporate functions. Of their foreign-based employees, more than 80% were engaged in supporting the loan servicing operations as of September 30, 2018.

== Controversies and litigation ==
In July 2002, Kweku Hanson, a Connecticut attorney, initiated a class-action suit against Ocwen Federal FSB of West Palm Beach, Florida, and he was represented in this by fellow attorney Paul Ngobeni. The lawsuit in Hanson v. Ocwen Federal Bank described a dispute over late charges and fees that the plaintiffs alleged continued for six years. He was joined in the suit by 57 individuals who claimed to have been injured by Ocwen. The lawsuit sought $1.5 billion in punitive and exemplary damages but was settled out of court for an undisclosed sum.

On December 19, 2013, California Attorney General Kamala D. Harris announced a $2.1 billion mortgage settlement with Ocwen Financial Corporation and Ocwen Loan Servicing over alleged mortgage servicing misconduct. California homeowners eligible to receive an estimated $268 million in first lien principal reductions and nearly $23 million in cash payments.

This agreement was with a total of 49 states, with $2 billion used to cover loan modifications and principal reductions for the people who lost their homes between January 1, 2009, and December 21, 2012, and those people whose loans were serviced by OCWEN. Richard Cordray, Director of the Consumer Financial Protection Bureau, criticized Ocwen's mortgage servicing practices in announcing the settlement, stating that the firm "took advantage" of loan borrowers.

Due to conflicts of interest, Erbey subsequently resigned from his role on the company's board. Ocwen paid Erbey $1.2 million in connection with his departure.
