= Consumer Financial Protection Bureau =

United States government agency

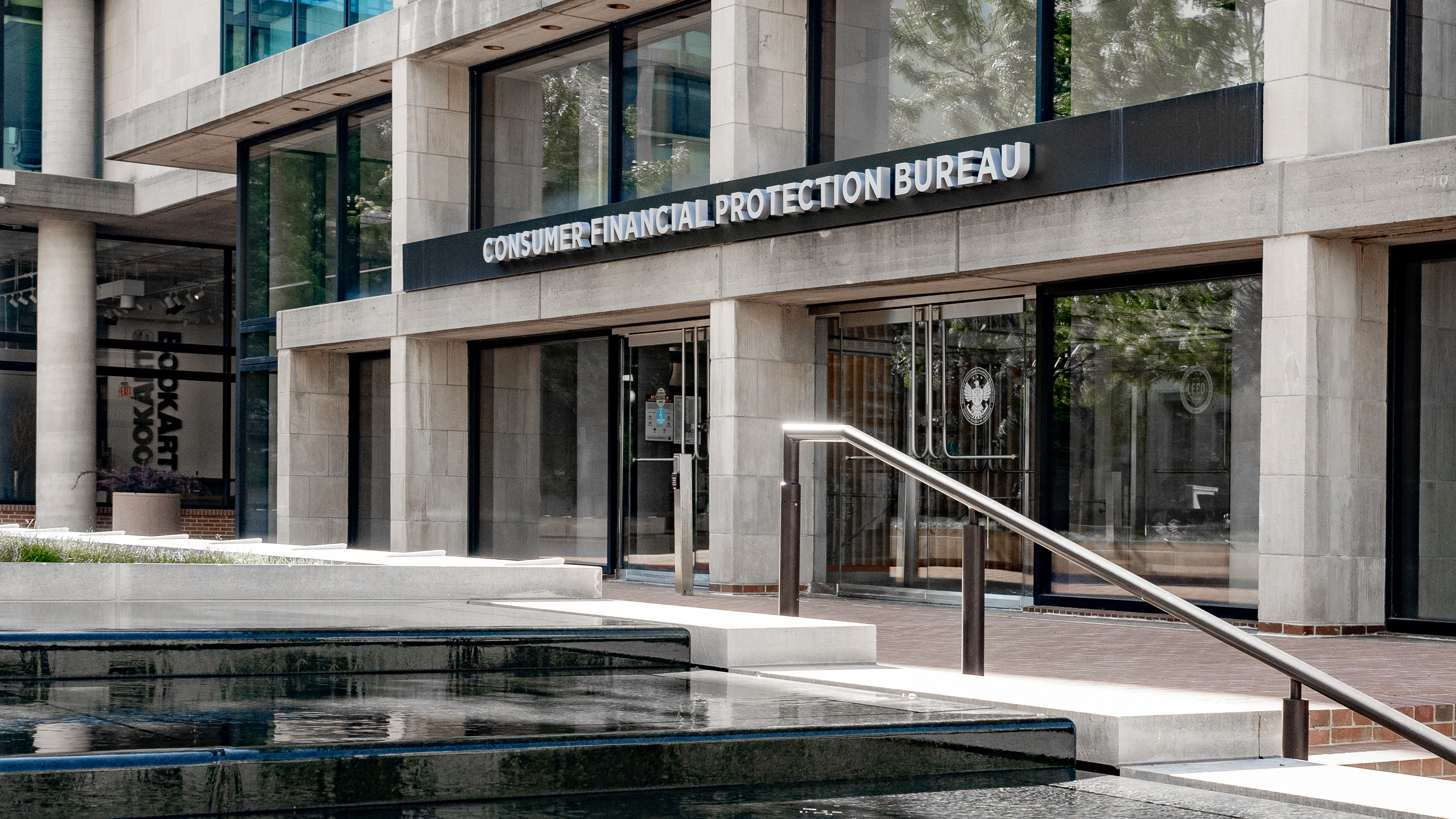
- Entrance to the Headquarters (2025)

Agency overview
- Formed: July 21, 2011; 15 years ago.
- Jurisdiction: United States
- Headquarters: Washington, D.C., U.S.; 38.898°N 77.040°W
- Employees: 1,421 (2025)
- Annual budget: US$494 million (FY 2025)
- Agency executive: Mark Paoletta, Acting Director
- Parent agency: Federal Reserve
- Key document: Dodd–Frank Wall Street Reform and Consumer Protection Act
- Website: consumerfinance.gov

The Consumer Financial Protection Bureau (CFPB) is an independent agency of the United States government responsible for consumer protection in the financial sector. CFPB's jurisdiction includes banks, credit unions, securities firms, payday lenders, mortgage-servicing operations, foreclosure relief services, debt collectors, for-profit colleges, and other financial companies operating in the United States.

The agency was originally proposed in 2007 by Elizabeth Warren while she was a law professor and she played an instrumental role in its establishment. The CFPB's creation was authorized by the Dodd–Frank Wall Street Reform and Consumer Protection Act, whose passage in 2010 was a legislative response to the 2008 financial crisis and the subsequent Great Recession, and is an independent bureau within the Federal Reserve.

Since its founding, the agency has returned more than $21 billion to consumers who were defrauded by financial institutions. The agency has established or proposed rules to cap overdraft charges and credit card late fees; prohibit medical debt from credit reports; limit the ability of data brokers to sell personal data; and limit predatory payday loan practices. The agency is funded through penalties collected with its enforcement actions and through transfers from the Federal Reserve.

Throughout its existence, the CFPB has been persistently targeted by Republican politicians and the financial industry. The CFPB's status as an independent agency has been subject to many challenges in court. In June 2020, the United States Supreme Court ruled that the president can remove the director without cause but allowed the agency to remain in operation. In 2024, the Supreme Court affirmed the constitutionality of the CFPB funding mechanism prescribed by Congress. At the outset of his second presidential term, Donald Trump appointed an acting director who immediately ordered the CFPB to stop regulatory activity, and sought to fire 90% of the agency's staff.

== Role ==
According to former director Richard Cordray, the bureau's priorities are mortgages, credit cards and student loans. The CFPB qualifies as a large independent agency that was designed to consolidate its employees and responsibilities from a number of other federal regulatory bodies, including the Federal Reserve, the Federal Trade Commission, the Federal Deposit Insurance Corporation, the National Credit Union Administration and the Department of Housing and Urban Development. The bureau is an independent unit located inside and funded by the Federal Reserve, with interim affiliation with the U.S. Treasury Department. The CFPB's Federal Reserve-based funding has come under scrutiny by the bureau's critics.

The CFPB writes and enforces rules for financial institutions, examines both bank and non-bank financial institutions, monitors and reports on markets, as well as collects and tracks consumer complaints.

The CFPB opened its website in early February 2011 to accept suggestions from consumers via YouTube, Twitter, and its own website interface. According to the U.S. Treasury Department, the bureau is tasked with the responsibility to "promote fairness and transparency for mortgages, credit cards, and other consumer financial products and services". According to its website, the CFPB's "central mission...is to make markets for consumer financial products and services work for Americans—whether they are applying for a mortgage, choosing among credit cards, or using any number of other consumer financial products". In 2016 alone most of the hundreds and thousands of consumer complaints about their financial services—including banks and credit card issuers—were received and compiled by CFPB and are publicly available on a federal government database.

Once a financial institution acquires $10 billion in assets, it falls under the guidance, rules, and regulations under the CFPB- is a "CFPB regulated bank". The CFPB will examine the institution for compliance with bank regulatory laws.

The regulations implemented by the bureau are in Chapter X of Title XII Banks and Banking of the US Code of Federal Regulations. Notable examples include the ECOA (Equal Credit Opportunity Act – Regulation B), HMDA (Home Mortgage Disclosure Act – Regulation C), Alternative Mortgage Transaction Parity Act of 1982 (Regulation D), EFTA (Electronic Fund Transfer Act – Regulation E), FDCPA (Fair Debt Collection Practices Act – Regulation F), FCRA (Fair Credit Reporting Act – Regulation V), RESPA (Real Estate Settlement Procedures Act – Regulation X), TILA (Truth in Lending Act – Regulation Z), and Truth in Savings Act (Regulation DD).

== History ==
In July 2010, Congress passed the Dodd–Frank Wall Street Reform and Consumer Protection Act, during the 111th United States Congress in response to the Great Recession and 2008 financial crisis. The agency was originally proposed in 2007 by then-Harvard Law School professor Elizabeth Warren, who later became a US senator. The proposed CFPB was actively supported by Americans for Financial Reform, a newly created umbrella organization of some 250 consumer, labor, civil rights and other activist organizations.

On September 17, 2010, President Barack Obama announced the appointment of Warren as Assistant to the President and Special Advisor to the Secretary of the Treasury on the Consumer Financial Protection Bureau to set up the new agency. Due to the way the legislation creating the bureau was written, until the first director was in place, the agency was not able to write new rules or supervise financial institutions other than banks.

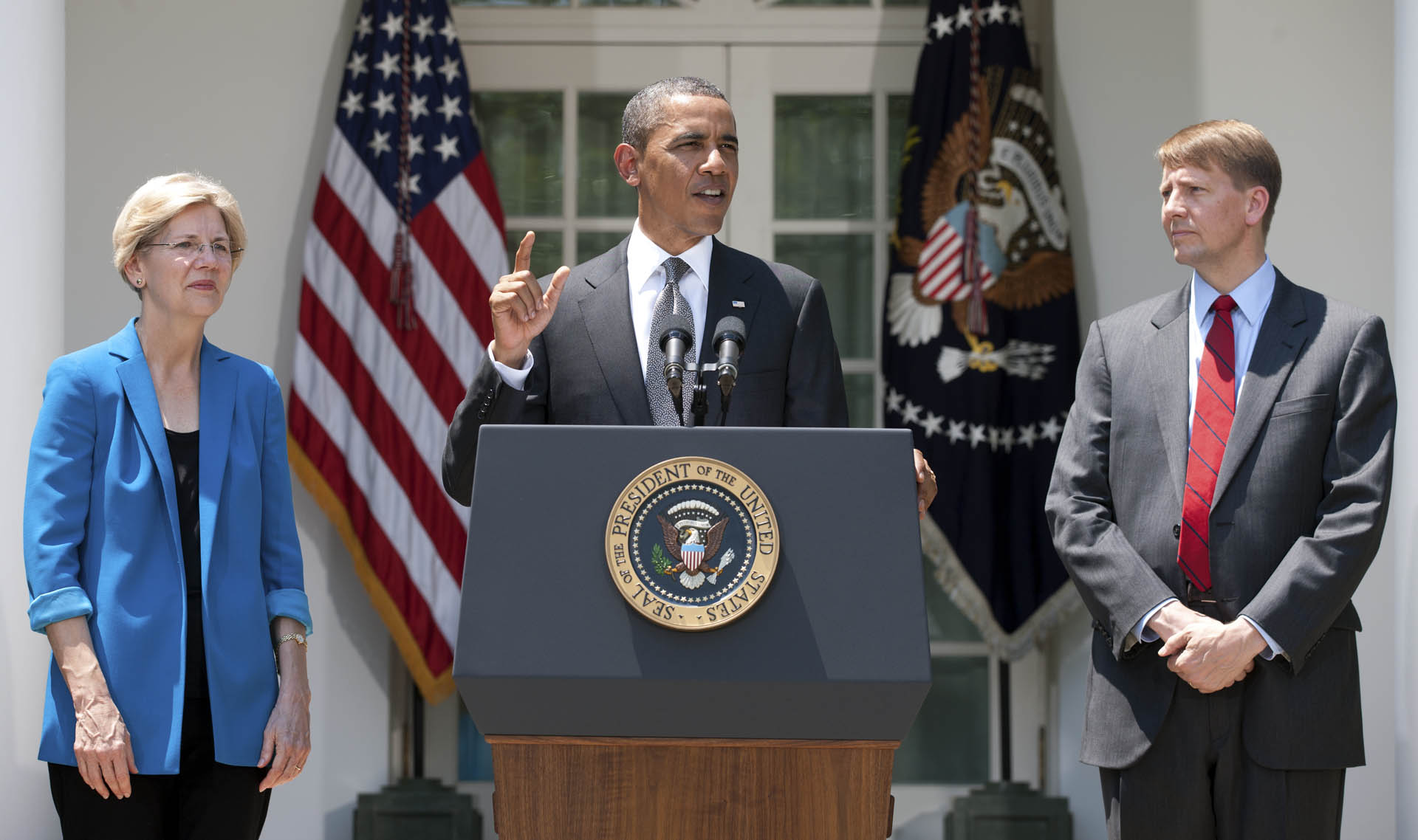
President Barack Obama announces the nomination of Richard Cordray as the first director of the CFPB on July 18, 2011.

Elizabeth Warren, who proposed and established the CFPB, was removed from consideration as the bureau's first formal director after Obama administration officials became convinced Warren could not overcome strong Republican opposition. On July 17, Obama nominated former Ohio attorney general and Ohio state treasurer Richard Cordray to be the first formal director of the CFPB. Prior to his nomination, Cordray had been hired as chief of enforcement for the agency.

However, Cordray's nomination was immediately in jeopardy due to 44 Senate Republicans vowing to derail any nominee in order to encourage a decentralized structure of the organization. Senate Republicans had also shown a pattern of refusing to consider regulatory agency nominees. The CFPB formally began operation on July 21, 2011.

Since the CFPB database was established in 2011, more than four million complaints have been published. CFPB supporters include the Consumers Union claim that it is a "vital tool that can help consumers make informed decisions". CFPB detractors argue that the CFPB database is a "gotcha game" and that there is already a database maintained by the Federal Trade Commission although that information is not available to the public.

On January 4, 2012, Barack Obama issued a recess appointment to install Cordray as director through the end of 2013. This was a highly controversial move as the Senate was still holding pro forma sessions, and the possibility existed that the appointment could be challenged in court. This type of recess appointment was unanimously ruled unconstitutional in NLRB v. Noel Canning.

On July 16, 2013, the Senate confirmed Cordray as director in a 66–34 vote. Cordray resigned in late 2017 to run for governor of Ohio.

The Financial CHOICE Act, proposed by the House Financial Services Committee's Jeb Hensarling, to repeal the Dodd–Frank Wall Street Reform and Consumer Protection Act, passed the House on June 8, 2017. Also in June 2017, the Senate was crafting its own reform bill.

Testimony in US Congressional hearings of 2017 have elicited concerns that the wholesale publication of consumer complaints is both misleading and injurious to the consumer market. Rep. Barry Loudermilk (R-GA) said at one such congressional hearing, "Is the purpose of the database just to name and shame companies? Or should they have a disclaimer on there that says it's a fact-free zone, or this is fake news? That's really what I see happening here." Bill Himpler, executive vice president of the American Financial Services Association, a trade group representing banks and other lenders responded "Something needs to be done." "Once the damage is done to a company, it's hard to get your reputation back.

Mick Mulvaney, as acting director of the CFPB, removed all 25 members of the agency's Consumer Advisory Board on June 5, 2018, after eleven of them held a press conference on June 3 in which they criticized him.

On February 13, 2021, President Joe Biden formally submitted to the Senate the nomination of Rohit Chopra to serve as director of the CFPB. His nomination was approved on September 30, 2021, by a 50–48 vote.

In December 2021, CFPB fined LendUp $100,000 due to deceptive marketing and fair lending violations, and the company was required to stop issuing new loans.

In June 2024, the CFPB proposed banning using medical debt in credit reports or loan decisions. In July 2024, the CFPB gave Zelle a choice between a settlement or litigation around its handling of fraud and scams on its platform.

=== Second Trump administration ===
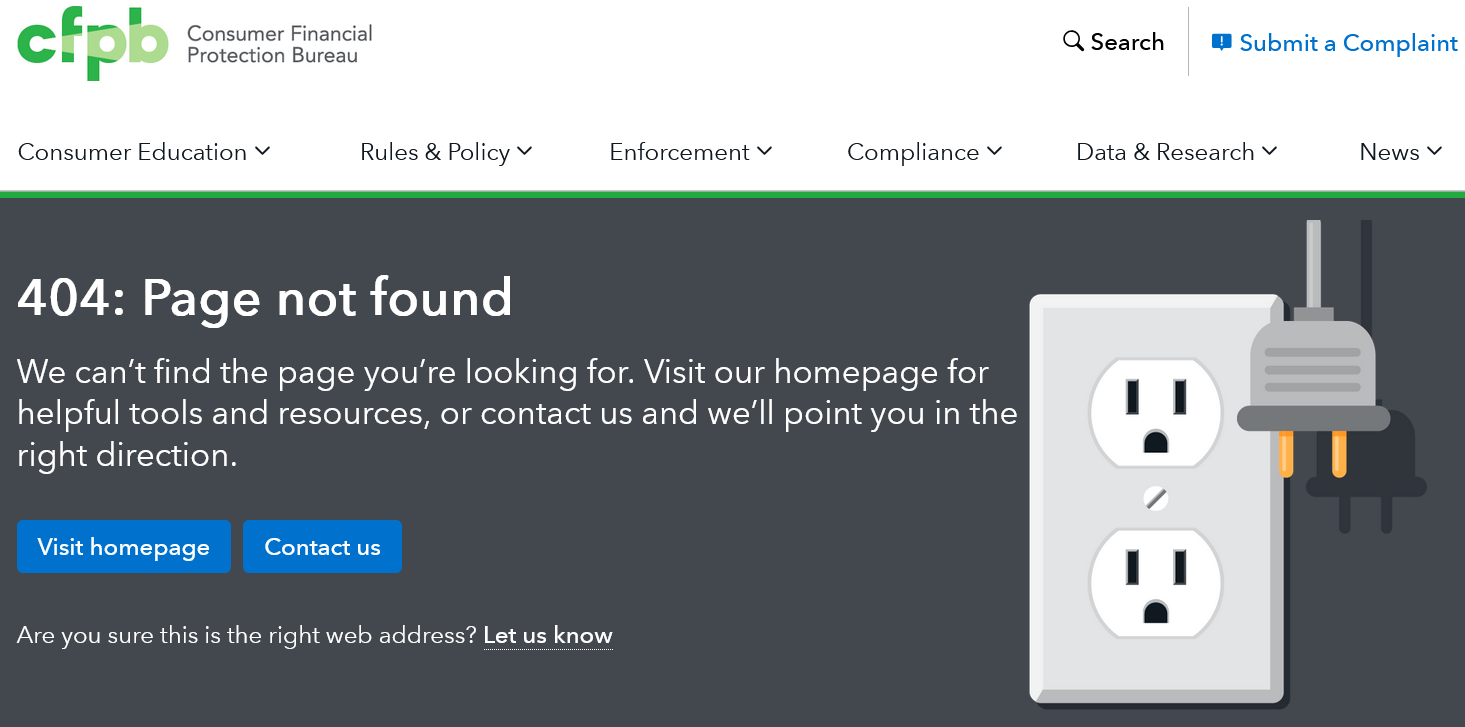
Consumer Financial Protection Bureau homepage screenshot February 2025

On February 1, 2025, Chopra was fired by President Donald Trump, making deputy director Zixta Martinez the acting director of the agency by operation of law. On February 3, Trump named Treasury Secretary and former hedge fund manager Scott Bessent as the agency's acting director. Bessent immediately ordered the agency to halt all work. On February 7, Office of Management and Budget Director Russell Vought emailed CFPB staff to let them know he was the acting director of the agency. On February 10, Vought ordered all CFPB staff to cease all work between February 10 and 14, and closed the CFPB Washington headquarters.

In February 2025, the bureau became a target of the Department of Government Efficiency, the Elon Musk-led team carrying out part of Trump's cost-cutting agenda. Staffers gained access to consumers' data. After February 14, 2025, the agency's website homepage displayed a 404 error for some time as parts of the website were purged. All content from the agency's social media accounts was removed. CFPB workers accused Musk of having a conflict of interest, as the agency was investigating several of his companies at the time. The New York Times published an article noting that "A public database shows hundreds of complaints about the electric car company Tesla, mostly concerning debt collection or loan problems".

On February 11, 2025, Vought restored the CFPB procedures that sustain the mortgage markets.

On February 14, 2025, a judge of the Federal District Court in Washington ordered officials at the CFPB not to "delete, destroy, remove or impair any data" or fire employees en masse. Immediately afterward, the agency's remaining employees were put on administrative leave until otherwise instructed. Some of CFPB's work is statutorily mandated, and cannot be ceased without congressional approval. On February 24, 2025, COO Adam Martinez claimed that the email to cease work was misinterpreted, and Vought only meant to allow him to assess the CFPB for the transition to the new administration, and not stop legally required operations. This claim is disputed by multiple emails from Vought himself.

In May 2025, the CFPB cancelled implementation of its proposed rules to regulate data brokers' collection of Americans' sensitive personal information.

== Regulatory activities ==
From its creation until 2017, the CFPB "has curtailed abusive debt collection practices, reformed mortgage lending, publicized and investigated hundreds of thousands of complaints from aggrieved customers of financial institutions, and extracted nearly $12 billion for 29 million consumers in refunds and canceled debts". That figure had risen to $19 billion by 2024. Claims may be filed by individual customers and address a variety of unfair business practices by companies, such as refusals to remove errant fees, or to provide compensation for damages.

=== Public outreach ===
The CFPB has created a number of personal finance tools for consumers, including Ask CFPB, which compiles plain-language answers to personal finance questions, and Paying for College, which estimates the cost of attending specific universities based on the financial aid offers a student has received.

In 2014, the CFPB attempted to help consumers understand the risks of cryptocurrencies.

=== Consumer data protection ===
In 2016, the CFPB took its first enforcement action against a company that the CFPB alleged had failed to properly protect the privacy and security of consumers' data.

=== Credit card fees ===
In 2024, the CFPB limited credit card late fees to $8. The rule was blocked by a judge, but the reason given for the block was overturned by the Supreme Court, giving the bureau confidence that the rule will be implemented.

=== Controversies ===
A 2013 press release from the United States House Financial Services Committee criticized the CFPB for what was described as a "radical structure" that "is controlled by a single individual who cannot be fired for poor performance and who exercises sole control over the agency, its hiring and its budget". Moreover, the committee alleged a lack of financial transparency and a lack of accountability to Congress or the president. Committee vice chairman Patrick McHenry, expressed particular concern about travel costs and a $55 million renovation of CFPB headquarters, stating "$55 million is more than the entire annual construction and acquisition budget for GSA for the totality of federal buildings."

In 2014, some employees and former employees of the CFPB testified before Congress about an alleged culture of racism and sexism at the agency. Former employees testified they were retaliated against for bringing problems to the attention of superiors.

House Republicans criticized the methodology the CFPB uses to identify instances of racial discrimination among auto lenders. Because of legal constraints, the agency used a system to "guess" the race of auto loan applicants based on their last name and listed address. Based on that information, the agency charged several lenders were discriminating against minority applicants and levied large fines and settlements against those companies. Ally Financial paid $98 million in fines and settlement fees in 2013. As the agency's methodology means it can only guess who may be victims of discrimination entitled to settlement funds, as of late 2015, the CFPB had yet to compensate any individuals who were victims of Ally's allegedly discriminatory practices. In 2016, the House voted to overturn its 2013 guidance, with 88 Democrats joining House Republicans.

== Amendments ==
On May 21, 2018, US president Donald Trump signed into law Congressional legislation repealing the enforcement of automobiles lending rules. On May 24, 2018, Trump signed into law the Economic Growth, Regulatory Relief and Consumer Protection Act, exempting dozens of banks from the CFPB's regulations.

On July 4, 2025, Trump signed the One Big Beautiful Bill Act, cutting the bureau's budget from its original cap of 12% of the Federal Reserve's annual operating expenses, to 6.5%.

=== Proposed amendment ===
On September 26, 2013, the Consumer Financial Protection Safety and Soundness Improvement Act of 2013 (H.R. 3193; 113th Congress) was introduced into the United States House of Representatives. The bill would have created a five-person commission and removed it from the Federal Reserve System. The CFPB would have been renamed the "Financial Product Safety Commission". The bill was also intended to make it easier to override the CFPB decisions. It passed in the House of Representatives on February 27, 2014, and was received by the Senate on March 4. It was never considered in the Democratic controlled Senate.

== Legal challenges ==
Two lawsuits were filed in the early years of the CFPB; they were both dismissed by federal courts, but one was appealed and is still ongoing. The first one, filed on June 21, 2012, by a Texas bank along with the Competitive Enterprise Institute, challenged the constitutionality of provisions of the CFPB. In August 2013, a federal judge dismissed the lawsuit because the plaintiffs had failed to show that they had suffered harm. In July 2015, the United States Court of Appeals for the District of Columbia Circuit affirmed in part and reversed in part, holding that the bank, but not the states that later joined the lawsuit, had standing to challenge the law, and returned the case for further proceedings.

A lawsuit filed July 22, 2013, by Morgan Drexen Integrated Systems, a provider of outsourced administrative support services to attorneys, and Connecticut attorney Kimberly A. Pisinski, challenged the constitutionality of the CFPB. The complaint, filed in the U.S. District Court for the District of Columbia, alleged that the "CFPB's structure insulates it from political accountability and internal checks and balances in violation of the United States Constitution. Unbridled from constitutionally-required accountability, CFPB has engaged in ultra vires and abusive practices, including attempts to regulate the practice of law (a function reserved for state bars), attempts to collect attorney-client protected material, and overreaching demands for, and mining of, personal financial information of American citizens, which has prompted a Government Accountability Office ("GAO") investigation, commenced on July 12, 2013." On August 22, 2013, one month after Morgan Drexen's lawsuit, the CFPB filed its own lawsuit against Morgan Drexen in the United States District Court for the Central District of California alleging that Morgan Drexen charged advance fees for debt relief services in violation of the Telemarketing Sales Rule and engaged in deceptive acts and practices in violation of the Consumer Financial Protection Act (CFPA). The CFPB won this lawsuit and Morgan Drexen was ordered to pay $132,882,488 in restitution and a $40 million civil penalty.

In October 2016, the Court of Appeals for the District of Columbia Circuit ruled that it was unconstitutional for the CFPB director to be removable by the president of the United States only for cause, such as "inefficiency, neglect of duty or malfeasance". Circuit Judge Brett Kavanaugh, joined by Senior Circuit Judge A. Raymond Randolph, wrote that the law was "a threat to individual liberty" and instead found that the president could remove the CFPB director at will. Circuit Judge Karen L. Henderson agreed that the CFPB Director had been wrong in adopting a new interpretation of the Real Estate Settlement Procedures Act, finding the statute of limitations did not apply to the CFPB, and fining the petitioning mortgage company PHH Corporation $109 million, but she dissented from giving the president a new power to remove the director, citing constitutional avoidance. The U.S. Court of Appeals for the District of Columbia Circuit vacated the decision and ordered en banc review. On January 31, 2018, the en banc D.C. Circuit found that the CFPB's structure was constitutional by a vote of 7–3. Judge Cornelia Pillard, writing for the majority, found that the Take Care Clause does not forbid independent agencies, while each of the circuit judges from the earlier panel wrote separate dissents.

In June 2018, New York Federal District Court judge Loretta Preska ruled against its structure. In January 2019, the Supreme Court denied review of the DC Circuit Court decision.

In October 2019, the Supreme Court announced it would review the constitutionality of the bureau's structure in the case Seila Law v. Consumer Financial Protection Bureau considering the split decision of the lower courts. Oral arguments began on March 3, 2020.

On June 29, 2020, the Supreme Court ruled in a 5–4 decision that the firing protections of the director are an unconstitutional restraint on the president's ability to oversee executive branch agencies. "Such an agency lacks a foundation in historical practice and clashes with constitutional structure by concentrating power in a unilateral actor insulated from Presidential control," Chief Justice John Roberts wrote in the majority opinion, which was joined by his conservative colleagues. The statutes around the Director's position on the CFPB were considered severable from the remaining structure of the CFPB, and the Court ordered that "The agency may therefore continue to operate, but its Director, in light of our decision, must be removable by the President at will." The dissenting opinion, written by Justice Elena Kagan, stated that the majority's decision has the court "second-guessing" the two political branches of government (Congress and the president) on how to structure the executive branch and "wipes out a feature of [the CFPB] its creators thought fundamental to its mission—a measure of independence from political pressure".

=== 2017 dispute over acting director ===
On November 24, 2017, Director Cordray appointed Leandra English to the position of deputy director, and announced that he would leave office at the close of business that day. Cordray indicated that would make English the acting director after his resignation, citing provisions of the Dodd–Frank Wall Street Reform and Consumer Protection Act providing that the deputy director of the CFPB becomes acting director in the "absence or unavailability" of the director. Later the same day, however, President Donald Trump appointed the incumbent director of the Office of Management and Budget, Mick Mulvaney, as acting director, citing the authority of the Federal Vacancies Reform Act of 1998.

On November 25, the Office of Legal Counsel released an opinion, written by Assistant Attorney General Steven Engel, asserting that the President has the authority under the FVRA to designate an acting CFPB Director. The OLC memo maintained that "both the Vacancies Reform Act and [§1011(b)(5) of Dodd–Frank] are available for filling on an acting basis a vacancy that results from the resignation of the CFPB's Director" but that "when the President designates an individual...outside the ordinary order of succession, the President's designation necessarily controls." This position was also supported by the General Counsel of the CFPB, Mary E. McLeod.

On November 26, English (represented by former CFPB senior counsel Deepak Gupta) filed a lawsuit in the United States District Court for the District of Columbia seeking a temporary restraining order and declaratory judgment to prevent Mulvaney from becoming acting director, Mulvaney was given access by unnamed individuals with the keys to the director's office on November 27 and ordered all CFPB employees to disregard any claims from English that she is the acting director. Both English and Mulvaney sent emails to the entire 1,600-person staff of the CFPB, each signing as "Acting Director" of the agency. On November 28, 2017, U.S. District Judge Timothy J. Kelly, who had been appointed by President Trump just a few months earlier, denied English's motion for a preliminary injunction and allowed Mulvaney to begin serving as CFPB acting director.

=== 2019 dispute over CFPB leadership ===
Seila Law LLC (Seila Law), a law firm that provided debt relief services, was under investigation by the CFPB. As part of its investigation, the CFPB issued a civil investigative demand (CID) to Seila Law, which required Seila Law to produce certain documents. Seila Law declined to comply with the CID and challenged the constitutionality of the CFPB. The CFPB brought a motion to enforce the CID to the United States District Court for the Central District of California, where District Judge Josephine Staton granted the motion after finding the CFPB was constitutionally structured.

Seila Law's appeal to the Ninth Circuit was dismissed. The 9th Circuit panel affirmed the District Court's ruling, and agreed that the Supreme Court's prior decisions upholding for-cause removal in Humphrey's Executor and Morrison were "controlling". It also referred approvingly to the en banc decision of the DC Circuit in PHH Corp. v. CFPB (2018), in which the Circuit found that the structure of the CFPB was constitutional.

There was arguably a circuit split on the question presented in Seila Law. While the Ninth Circuit and DC Circuit had held that the CFPB's structure is constitutional, the Fifth Circuit in Collins v. Mnuchin (2018) held that the structure of the Federal Housing Finance Agency—another agency whose director can be removed only for cause—violated the separation of powers.

The Supreme Court granted certiorari in Seila Law on October 18, 2019, and heard oral argument on March 3, 2020.

The Court issued its decision on June 29, 2020. The 5-4 decision ruled that the CFPB structure, with a sole director that could only be terminated for cause, was unconstitutional as it violated the separation of powers, vacating the lower court judgement and remanding the case for review. The Court recognized that the statutes around the director of the CFPB was severable from the rest of the statute establishing the agency, and thus "The agency may therefore continue to operate, but its Director, in light of our decision, must be removable by the President at will."

Chief Justice John Roberts wrote the majority opinion joined by conservative Justices Clarence Thomas, Samuel Alito, Neil Gorsuch, and Brett Kavanaugh. Roberts wrote that the CFPB structure with a single point of leadership that could only be removed for cause "has no foothold in history or tradition", and has only been used in four other instances: three current uses for the United States Office of Special Counsel, the Social Security Administration, and the Federal Housing Finance Agency, and temporarily for one year during the American Civil War for the Office of the Comptroller of the Currency. Roberts wrote that the three current uses "are modern and contested. And they do not involve regulatory or enforcement authority comparable to that exercised by the CFPB." Roberts also wrote that the CFPB structure "is also incompatible with the structure of the Constitution, which—with the sole exception of the Presidency—scrupulously avoids concentrating power in the hands of any single individual". Roberts referred back to the precedent established by Humphrey's Executor and Morrison as a basis for the majority's decision.

Justice Elena Kagan wrote the dissent joined by justices Ruth Bader Ginsburg, Stephen Breyer, and Sonia Sotomayor. Kagan challenged the separation of powers argument presented by the majority: "Nowhere does the text [of the Constitution] say anything about the President's power to remove subordinate officials at will." The dissenting Justices did concur on the matter of severability of the remaining structure of the CFPB outside of the director.

=== 2022 dispute over funding structure ===
In 2018, the Community Financial Services Association of America sued the CFPB over its 2017 rule that blocked lenders to attempt to collect funds from borrowers' accounts after two consecutive failed attempts, unless the borrower had consented. Part of its argument in the case was that the CFPB's budgetary structure was unconstitutional, as it did not receive funding through Congressional appropriations but requested its funding through the Federal Reserve. While the district court ruled against the association, the Fifth Circuit ruled in favor of the association in October 2022, deeming that its funding structure was unconstitutional.

That opinion was appealed to the US Supreme Court, which reversed the 5th Circuit and upheld the CFPB's funding mechanism. In May 2024, the Court ruled for the CFPB in a 7-2 decision written by Justice Clarence Thomas.

== List of directors ==
Status

Special advisor
Acting director

No.	Portrait	Name	State of residence	Took office	Left office	Tenure	Presidents
–	Elizabeth Warren	Elizabeth Warren; Special Advisor	Massachusetts	September 17, 2010	August 1, 2011	318 days	Barack Obama
–	Raj Date	Raj Date; Special Advisor	District of Columbia	August 1, 2011	January 4, 2012	156 days	Barack Obama
1	Richard Cordray	Richard Cordray (Note: Cordray’s resignation took effect at the stroke of midnight (12:00 A.M.) Eastern Standard Time (EST) on November 25, 2017.)	Ohio	January 4, 2012	November 24, 2017	5 years, 16 days	Barack Obama
1	Richard Cordray	Richard Cordray	Ohio	January 4, 2012	November 24, 2017	308 days (5 years, 324 days total)	Donald Trump
–	Leandra English	Leandra English; Acting (Note: As Deputy Director of the Consumer Financial Protection Bureau (CFPB), by operation of law, English had served as Acting Director of the Consumer Financial Protection Bureau (CFPB) for one minute on November 25, 2017 immediately following the resignation of Director Richard Cordray taking effect at the stroke of midnight (12:00 A.M.) Eastern Standard Time (EST) on November 25, 2017 until President Donald Trump’s appointment of Office of Management and Budget (OMB) Director Mick Mulvaney as Acting Director of the Consumer Financial Protection Bureau (CFPB) took effect one minute later at 12:01 A.M. Eastern Standard Time (EST) on November 25, 2017.)	New York	November 25, 2017 (One minute)		0 days	Donald Trump
–	Mick Mulvaney	Mick Mulvaney; Acting (Note: President Donald Trump’s appointment of Office of Management and Budget (OMB) Director Mick Mulvaney as Acting Director of the Consumer Financial Protection Bureau (CFPB) took effect at 12:01 A.M. Eastern Standard Time (EST) on November 25, 2017.)	South Carolina	November 25, 2017	December 11, 2018	1 year, 16 days	Donald Trump
2	Mick Mulvaney	Kathy Kraninger	Ohio	December 11, 2018	January 20, 2021	2 years, 40 days	Donald Trump
–		Dave Uejio; Acting	District of Columbia	January 20, 2021	October 12, 2021	265 days	Joe Biden
3	Rohit Chopra	Rohit Chopra	District of Columbia	October 12, 2021	February 1, 2025	3 years, 100 days	Joe Biden
3	Rohit Chopra	Rohit Chopra	District of Columbia	October 12, 2021	February 1, 2025	12 days (3 years, 112 days total)	Donald Trump
–		Zixta Martinez; Acting (Note: As Deputy Director of the Consumer Financial Protection Bureau (CFPB), by operation of law, Martinez had served as Acting Director of the Consumer Financial Protection Bureau (CFPB) for two days immediately following the firing of Rohit Chopra on February 1, 2025 until President Donald Trump’s appointment of United States Secretary of the Treasury Scott Bessent as Acting Director of the Consumer Financial Protection Bureau (CFPB) two days later on February 3, 2025.)	Texas	February 1, 2025	February 3, 2025	2 days	Donald Trump
–		Scott Bessent; Acting	South Carolina	February 3, 2025	February 7, 2025	4 days	Donald Trump
–		Russell Vought; Acting	Virginia	February 7, 2025	August 1, 2026	1 year, 175 days	Donald Trump
–		Mark Paoletta; Acting	Virginia	August 1, 2026	present	103 days	Donald Trump

== See also ==
- Regulatory responses to the subprime crisis
- Subprime mortgage crisis solutions debate
- Title 12 of the Code of Federal Regulations
- Volcker Rule
- Wall Street reform
- List of financial supervisory authorities by country
