= PHH Corporation =

American financial services corporation headquartered in Mount Laurel, New Jersey

- Company type: Subsidiary
- Industry: Financial services
- Founded: 1946
- Founder: Duane Peterson, Harley Howell and Richard Heather
- Fate: Acquired by Onity Group
- Headquarters: 1 Mortgage Way; Mount Laurel, New Jersey, U.S.
- Key people: Glen A. Messina (CEO); Robert B. Crowl (CFO)
- Products: Mortgage services Mortgage loans
- Revenue: ▼US$ 639 million (2014)
- Operating income: ▼US$ -284 million (2014)
- Net income: ▼US$ 87 million (2014)
- Total assets: ▼US$ 4.296 billion (2014)
- Total equity: ▼US$ 1,571 billion (2014)
- Parent: Onity Group
- Website: www.phhmortgage.com

The PHH Corporation is an American financial services corporation headquartered in Mount Laurel, New Jersey which provides mortgage services to some of the world's largest financial services firms. PHH is the biggest U.S. outsourcer of home loans, processes and originates mortgages on behalf of small banks and some of the world's largest financial firms, including Morgan Stanley and HSBC Holdings Plc. On October 4, 2018 Ocwen Financial completed its acquisition of PHH Corporation and PHH is now a wholly owned subsidiary of Ocwen Financial Corp 272029400335

.

PHH was founded by Duane Peterson, Harley Howell and Richard Heather in 1946 in Mount Laurel, New Jersey and incorporated in 1953 as a Maryland corporation providing mortgage services, employee relocation services, fleet management services.

Between April 30, 1997 and February 1, 2005, PHH was a wholly owned subsidiary of Cendant Corporation (now known as Avis Budget Group) and its predecessors that provided mortgage banking services, facilitated employee relocations and provided vehicle fleet management and fuel card services.

On February 1, 2005, as a result of a Cendant spin-off, PHH began operating as an independent, publicly traded company under the stock symbol NYSE: PHH.

On July 1, 2014, all issued and outstanding equity interests in their Fleet Management Services business and related fleet entities were sold to Element Financial Corporation, for a purchase price of $1.4 billion. The Fleet business was focused on providing commercial fleet management services to corporate clients and government agencies throughout the U.S. and Canada which included fleet leasing services and additional services and products for vehicle maintenance, accident management, driver safety training and fuel cards. The transaction resulted in a $241 million net gain on sale reported on the 2014 Annual Report.

In November 2014, an Administrative law judge decided that PHH had paid illegal kickbacks in violation of the Real Estate Settlement Procedures Act by referring consumers to mortgage insurers who would pay a reinsurance premium to a PHH subsidiary, fining the company $6.5 million. PHH appealed to Consumer Financial Protection Bureau Director Richard Cordray, who on June 4, 2015, adopted a new reinterpretation broadening RESPA, made a new finding that the statute of limitations did not apply to the CFPB, and ordered PHH to disgorge $109 million.

The United States Court of Appeals for the District of Columbia Circuit stayed Director Cordray's decision in August, 2015. On October 11, 2016, a panel of the circuit court vacated and remanded Director Cordray's decision, writing that “The CFPB’s order violated bedrock principles of due process”. Circuit Judge Brett Kavanaugh, joined by Senior Circuit Judge A. Raymond Randolph, made the additional finding that the unusual statute making the CFPB Director removable only for cause was unconstitutional, and the President of the United States can remove the Director at will, over a partial dissent by Circuit Judge Karen L. Henderson. On January 31, 2018, the en banc D.C. Circuit overturned the panel's constitutional decision and upheld the removal protections for the CFPB director.

As of October 4, 2018 the PHH Corporation was acquired by Ocwen Financial Corp for approximately $360 million. The company stock as listed on the NYSE was delisted and is now traded under Ocwen NYSE: OCN. PHH now operates as a wholly owned subsidiary of Ocwen, retaining the former PHH CEO Glen A. Messina as President and Chief Executive Officer of Ocwen and transitioned its employees from PHH to Ocwen.

== See also ==
- Lightfoot v. Cendant Mortgage Corp.
