= Dave Uejio =

American government official

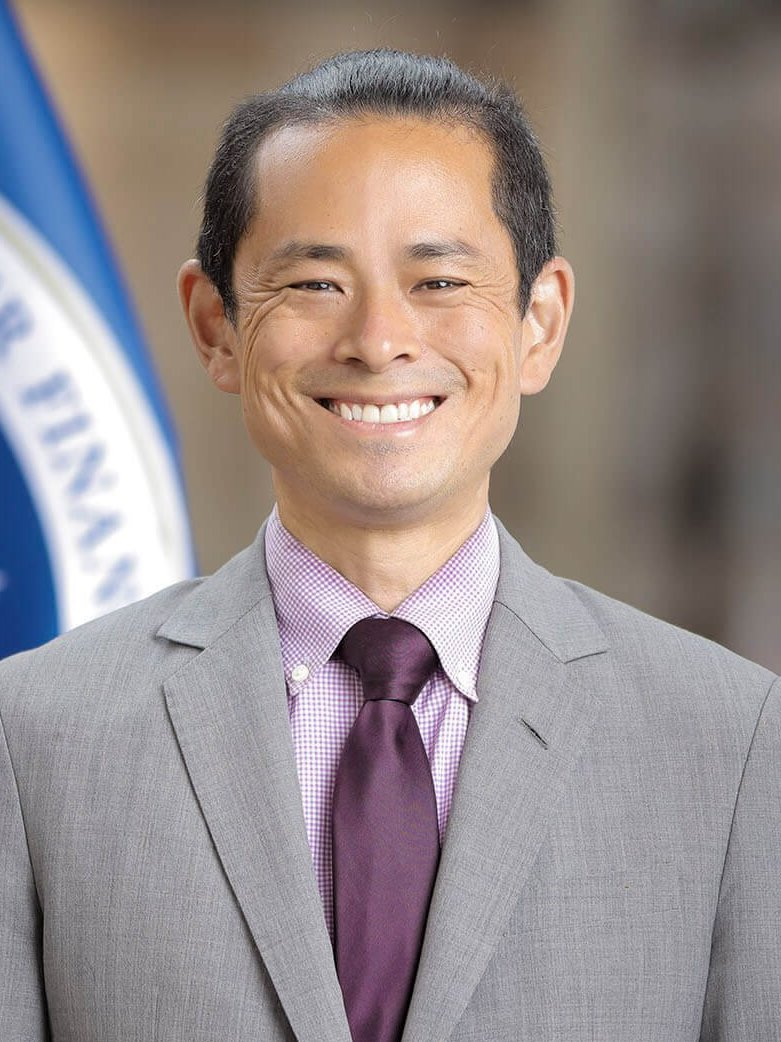

Director of the Consumer Financial Protection Bureau
- Acting
- In office January 20, 2021 – October 12, 2021
- President: Joe Biden
- Preceded by: Kathy Kraninger
- Succeeded by: Rohit Chopra

Personal details
- Born: David Uejio
- Education: University of California, Santa Barbara (BA); University of Minnesota (MPP)

David Uejio is an American government official who is the chief strategy officer at the Consumer Financial Protection Bureau (CFPB), where he previously served as acting director in 2021. In 2021 he was nominated to serve as assistant secretary of housing and urban development for fair housing and equal opportunity but his nomination stalled in the U.S. Senate.

== Education ==
A third-generation Japanese American (sansei), Uejio received his Bachelor of Arts degree in history from the University of California, Santa Barbara (UCSB). In 2004, Uejio received a Masters of Public Policy degree from the University of Minnesota's Humphrey School of Public Affairs.

== Career ==
Uejio began his career in government at the National Institutes of Health (NIH), serving as a public management fellow from 2006 to 2008 and as assistant to the director from 2008 to 2012. In 2015, Uejio served as a senior strategist in the Office of the Secretary of Defense.

In 2021, he was nominated to serve as assistant secretary of housing and urban development for fair housing and equal opportunity.

=== Consumer Financial Protection Bureau (CFPB) ===
Uejio joined the Consumer Financial Protection Bureau (CFPB) in 2013. During his time at the CFPB, Uejio has served in a variety of roles at the agency, including as lead for talent acquisition and as the agency's strategy program manager. Uejio made his way up through the agency, reaching the positions of acting deputy chief of staff, acting chief of staff, and as chief strategy officer at various points in his tenure. In 2021, he became the agency's acting Director pending the confirmation of Rohit Chopra, who was nominated to lead the CFPB.

During his tenure as acting director, he has been praised by Senator Elizabeth Warren, considered to be the architect of the agency, who stated he has been successful in "getting the agency back on track". The American Prospect praised Uejio for implementing changes to a guidance called "Regulation E", which the publication described as an important step towards combating financial predators.

=== Department of Housing and Urban Development ===
Uejio was nominated by President Biden to be an assistant secretary of housing and urban development for fair housing and equal opportunity on June 24, 2021. The Senate's Banking Committee held hearings for Uejio's nomination on August 5, 2021. On October 5, 2021, the Committee deadlocked on the nomination in a party-line vote. His nomination was returned to the President on January 3, 2022.

The next day, President Biden renominated several nominations along with Uejio. On January 19, 2022, the committee once again deadlocked on his nomination in a party-line vote. His nomination was resubmitted in January 2023 and was reported out of committee but it expired in January 2024 and was not resubmitted.

Government offices
Preceded by Kathy Kraninger	Director of the Consumer Financial Protection Bureau; Acting; 2021	Succeeded by Rohit Chopra
