= Lightfoot v. Cendant Mortgage Corp. =

- Supreme Court of the United States

Argued November 8, 2016 Decided January 18, 2017
- Full case name: Crystal Monique Lightfoot, et al., Petitioners v. Cendant Mortgage Corporation, DBA PHH Mortgage et al.
- Docket no.: 14-1055
- Citations: 580 U.S. 82 (more) 137 S. Ct. 553; 196 L. Ed. 2d 493
- Opinion announcement: Opinion announcement

Case history
- Prior: 769 F.3d 681 (9th Cir. 2014)

Holding
- Plaintiffs may file lawsuits against Fannie Mae in any state or federal court that is already endowed with subject-matter jurisdiction over the suit.

Court membership
- Chief Justice John Roberts Associate Justices Anthony Kennedy · Clarence Thomas; Ruth Bader Ginsburg · Stephen Breyer; Samuel Alito · Sonia Sotomayor; Elena Kagan

Case opinion
- Majority: Sotomayor, joined by unanimous

Laws applied
- 12 U.S.C. §1723a(a)

Lightfoot v. Cendant Mortgage Corp., 580 U.S. 82 (2017), was a United States Supreme Court case that clarified whether Fannie Mae can be sued in state courts. In a unanimous opinion written by Justice Sonia Sotomayor, the Court held that plaintiffs may file lawsuits against Fannie Mae in any state or federal court that is "already endowed with subject-matter jurisdiction over the suit."

== Background ==
The case arose when two mortgage borrowers filed a lawsuit in state court, which alleged deficiencies in the foreclosure and sale of their home. Relying upon a federal law that granted Fannie Mae the right "to sue and to be sued, and to complain and to defend, in any court of competent jurisdiction, State or Federal" (the "sue-and-be-sued clause"), Fannie Mae filed a motion to remove the case to federal court. The district court denied the motion, but on appeal, the United States Court of Appeals for the Ninth Circuit held that Fannie Mae's sue-and-be-sued clause "confers jurisdiction on the federal courts." District Judge Sidney H. Stein, sitting by designation, dissented, concluding that the sue-and-be-sued clause required an independent source for jurisdiction in cases involving Fannie Mae. In light of a circuit split on this issue, the Supreme Court granted certiorari in 2016.

== Opinion of the Court ==
In a unanimous opinion written by Justice Sonia Sotomayor, the Court reversed the Ninth Circuit's ruling and rejected Fannie Mae's assertion that it could automatically remove any case to a federal court. After reviewing other party-specific sue-and-be-sued clauses, Justice Sotomayor stated that the phrase "court of competent jurisdiction" allowed any court with "an existing source of subject-matter jurisdiction" to hear cases against Fannie Mae. Consequently, Justice Sotomayor held that federal law "permits suit in any state or federal court already endowed with subject-matter jurisdiction over the suit."

== See also ==
- List of United States Supreme Court cases
- Lists of United States Supreme Court cases by volume
- List of United States Supreme Court cases by the Roberts Court
