= Zixta Martinez =

American government official

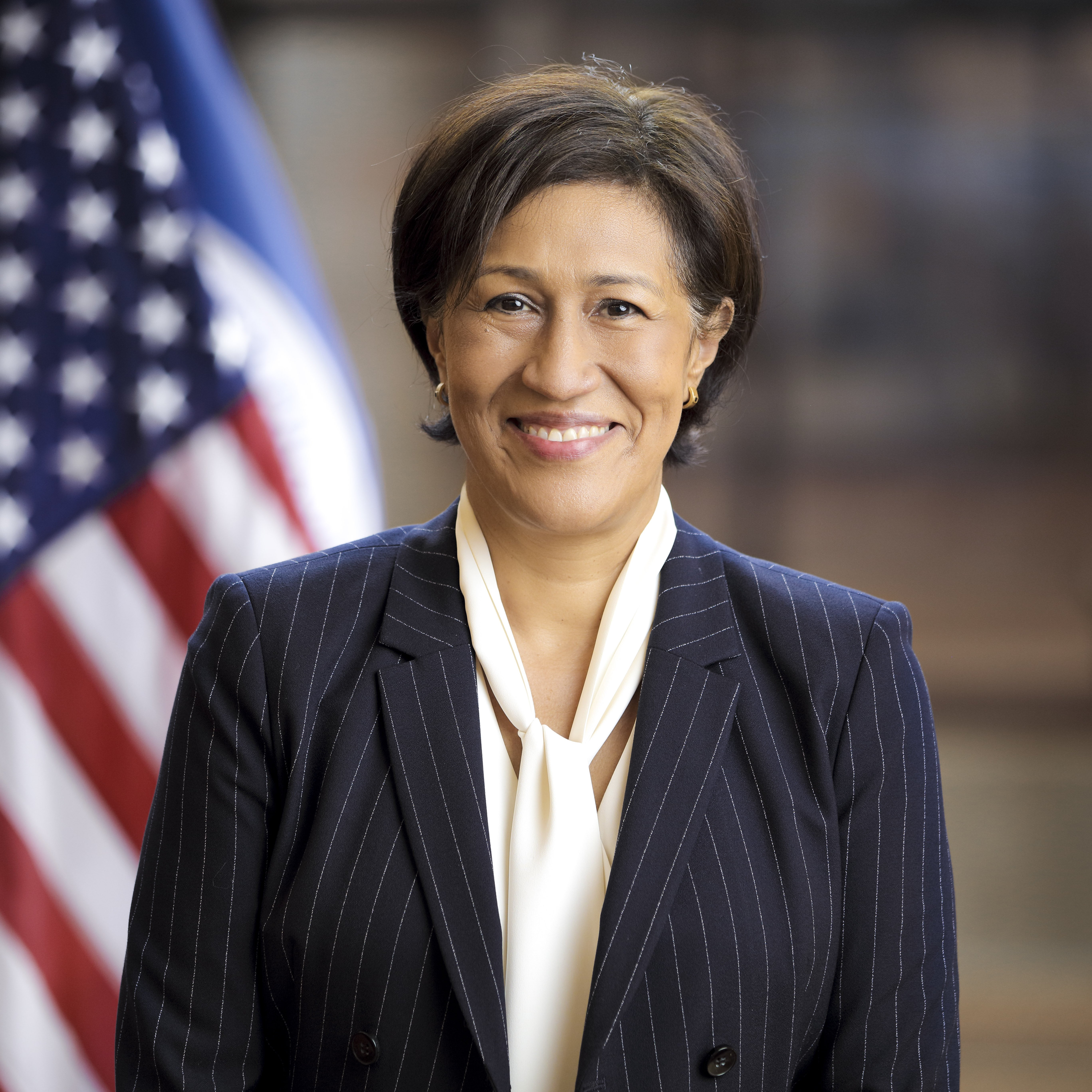

Deputy Director of the Consumer Financial Protection Bureau
- Incumbent
- Assumed office October 13, 2021 (On administrative leave since February 11, 2025)
- President: Joe Biden; Donald Trump
- Preceded by: Thomas Pahl
- Succeeded by: Mark Paoletta

Acting Director of the Consumer Financial Protection Bureau
- In office February 1, 2025 – February 3, 2025
- President: Donald Trump
- Deputy: Herself
- Preceded by: Rohit Chopra
- Succeeded by: Scott Bessent (acting)

Personal details
- Education: Yale College; University of Texas at Austin Lyndon B. Johnson School of Public Affairs; University of Miami School of Law

Zixta Q. Martinez is an American government official who has been deputy director of the Consumer Financial Protection Bureau (CFPB) since October 13, 2021. As deputy director of the Consumer Financial Protection Bureau (CFPB), by operation of law, she had served as acting director of the Consumer Financial Protection Bureau (CFPB) for two days immediately following the firing of Rohit Chopra on February 1, 2025 until President Donald Trump’s appointment of United States Secretary of the Treasury Scott Bessent as acting director of the Consumer Financial Protection Bureau (CFPB) two days later on February 3, 2025. She has been on administrative leave as deputy director of the Consumer Financial Protection Bureau (CFPB) since February 11, 2025. She had joined the Consumer Financial Protection Bureau (CFPB) in 2010 to help lead the implementation team and has since served as Senior Advisor for Supervision, Enforcement and Fair Lending, associate director for External Affairs, and assistant director for the Office of Community Affairs. Previously, she was Senior Director of Industry and State Relations at Freddie Mac, Director at the National Fair Housing Alliance, Legislative Staff Attorney at the Mexican American Legal Defense and Education Fund, Inc., Housing Policy Analyst for the National Council of La Raza, and Associate Staffer at the Housing and Community Development Subcommittee of the Banking Finance and Urban Affairs Committee in the U.S. House of Representatives. She is a graduate of Yale College, the Lyndon B. Johnson School of Public Affairs at the University of Texas at Austin, and the University of Miami School of Law.

Government offices
Preceded by Thomas Pahl	Deputy Director of the Consumer Financial Protection Bureau; 2021–present On administrative leave since February 11, 2025	Succeeded by Incumbent
Preceded by Rohit Chopra	Director of the Consumer Financial Protection Bureau; Acting; 2025	Succeeded by Scott Bessent; Acting
