= Consumer Financial Protection Safety and Soundness Improvement Act of 2013 =

Bill to restructure the Consumer Financial Protection Bureau (CFPB)

- Long title: To amend the Consumer Financial Protection Act of 2010 to strengthen the review authority of the Financial Stability Oversight Council of regulations issued by the Bureau of Consumer Financial Protection, and for other purposes.
- Announced in: the 113th United States Congress
- Sponsored by: Rep. Sean P. Duffy (R, WI-7)
- Number of co-sponsors: 0

Codification
- Acts affected: Consumer Financial Protection Act of 2010
- U.S.C. sections affected: 12 U.S.C. § 5513, 12 U.S.C. § 5512

Legislative history
- Introduced in the House as H.R. 3193 by Rep. Sean P. Duffy (R, WI-7) on September 26, 2013; Committee consideration by United States House Committee on Financial Services

The Consumer Financial Protection Safety and Soundness Improvement Act of 2013 (H.R. 3193) is a bill that would restructure the Consumer Financial Protection Bureau (CFPB) by transforming it into a five-person commission and removing it from the Federal Reserve System. The CFPB would be renamed the "Financial Product Safety Commission." This bill is also intended to make overturning the decisions about regulations that the new commission makes easier to do.

The Consumer Financial Protection Safety and Soundness Improvement Act of 2013 was introduced into the United States House of Representatives during the 113th United States Congress.

== Background ==
The Consumer Financial Protection Bureau (CFPB) is an independent federal agency that holds primary responsibility for regulating consumer protection with regard to financial products and services in the United States. It is supposed to protect the public from "risky or fraudulent financial products" and it has the power to issue regulations in order to accomplish this goal. The CFPB was created in 2011 after its conception was included as part of the Dodd–Frank Wall Street Reform and Consumer Protection Act, which passed as a response to the 2008 financial crisis that played a significant role in creating the Great Recession and was signed into law by President Barack Obama. The jurisdiction of the bureau includes banks, credit unions, securities firms, payday lenders, mortgage-servicing operations, foreclosure relief services, debt collectors and other financial companies, and its most pressing concerns are mortgages, credit cards and student loans, according to Director Richard Cordray. The CFPB has been challenged more than once as being unconstitutional.

== Provisions of the bill ==
This summary is based largely on the summary provided by the Congressional Research Service, a public domain source.

The Consumer Financial Protection Safety and Soundness Improvement Act of 2013 would amend the Consumer Financial Protection Act of 2010 to authorize the Chairperson of the Financial Stability Oversight Council to issue a stay of, or set aside, any regulation issued by the Consumer Financial Protection Bureau (CFPB) upon the affirmative vote of the majority of Council members (currently, two-thirds), excluding the Director of the Bureau.

The bill would require the Council, upon the petition of a member agency of the Council, to set aside a final regulation prescribed by the CFPB if the Council decides that such regulation is inconsistent with the safe and sound operations of U.S. financial institutions. (Currently the Council is merely authorized, upon petition, to set aside a final regulation if it would put the safety and soundness of the U.S. banking system or the stability of the U.S. financial system at risk.)

The bill would repeal: (1) the prohibition against Council set-aside of a regulation after expiration of a specified time period, and (2) mandatory dismissal of a petition if the Council has not issued a decision within such time period.

The bill would require the CFPB Director, when prescribing a rule under federal consumer financial laws, to consider its impact upon the financial safety or soundness of an insured depository institution.

== Congressional Budget Office report ==
This summary is based largely on the summary provided by the Congressional Budget Office, as ordered reported by the House Committee on Financial Services on November 21, 2013. This is a public domain source.

H.R. 3193 would amend the statute that authorizes the Financial Stability Oversight Council (FSOC) to delay implementation or set aside final regulations developed by the Consumer Financial Protection Bureau (CFPB). The bill also would require the CFPB, when developing a new rule, to consider the impact of the rule on the financial soundness of an insured depository institution.

The Congressional Budget Office (CBO) estimates that enacting H.R. 3193 would increase direct spending by $5 million over the 2014-2024 period; therefore, pay-as-you-go procedures apply. CBO estimates that enacting H.R. 3193 would not have a significant effect on revenues and implementing the bill would not affect discretionary costs.

H.R. 3193 contains no intergovernmental or private-sector mandates as defined in the Unfunded Mandates Reform Act and would not affect the budgets of state, local, or tribal governments.

== Procedural history ==
The Consumer Financial Protection Safety and Soundness Improvement Act of 2013 was introduced into the United States House of Representatives on September 26, 2013 by Rep. Sean P. Duffy (R, WI-7). It was referred to the United States House Committee on Financial Services. On November 21, 2013, the committee voted to report the bill 32-25. It was reported alongside House Report 113-346 on February 6, 2014. On February 7, 2014, House Majority Leader Eric Cantor announced that H.R. 3193 would be on the House schedule for February 11 or 12th, 2014.

== Debate and discussion ==
Republicans argue that this bill would increase the transparency and accountability of the CFPB. They argue that a five-person board would be more accountable and would have to spend more time debating and compromising.

== See also ==
- List of bills in the 113th United States Congress
