= Kweku Hanson =

Disbarred American lawyer and criminal

Kweku Joseph Hanson (born June 21, 1961, in Accra, Ghana) graduated with an AB from Bowdoin College, Brunswick, ME in 1985 and Doctor of Jurisprudence (Juris Doctor, or JD, approximately equivalent to LLB) degree from University of Connecticut School of Law in 1988. He was subsequently disbarred as an attorney and immigration law practitioner due to numerous complaints involving unethical conduct, non-delivery of service, maladministration of client's funds, as well as his conviction on charges of sexual assault, child pornography and tampering with witnesses.

== Notable lawsuits ==
In September 2000, he represented a West Hartford woman who sued Bridgestone/Firestone Inc. and the Ford Motor Co., seeking $60 million for the "humiliation, mental anguish and emotional distress" she had suffered while driving her Ford Explorer, which was equipped with recalled tires. Rhona Baugh-Seawright had been "panicky and scared" for the two months since she learned of the nationwide recall, according to Kweku J. Hanson, after filing the lawsuit in U.S. District Court in Hartford. "Her lawsuit does not seek any redress for personal injury due to an accident," he said.

In July 2002, Kweku Hanson initiated a class-action suit against Ocwen Federal FSB of West Palm Beach, Florida, where he was represented by fellow Connecticut attorney Paul Ngobeni. The 123-page lawsuit in Hanson v. Ocwen Federal Bank outlines a six-year running battle over late charges and fees. The lawsuit sought $1.5 billion in punitive and exemplary damages, but was settled out of court for an undisclosed sum.

In 2003, Hanson and Paul Ngobeni, his associate from the Ocwen class action suit, represented three plaintiffs who claimed to represent "all persons who lived in South Africa between 1948 and the present and who suffered damages as a result of apartheid." Punitive and compensatory damages in excess $400 billion were claimed from a "slew" of multinational corporations (including IBM, Citigroup, GE, DuPont and many others) that did business in apartheid South Africa for violations of international law subject to suit in United States federal district court under the Alien Tort Claims Act, 28 U.S.C. § 1350 ("ATCA"), and other jurisdictional provisions. Two other South African anti-apartheid lawsuits—the Khulumani et al., vs Barclays Bank et al., lawsuit; and the Ntsebeza vs Daimler Chrysler Corp lawsuit had previously been initiated separately during 2002. The Southern District Court of New York under Judge John E. Sprizzo found for defendants' motion to dismiss the complaint. That finding was partially vacated by the US Court of Appeal (Second Circuit) in an appeal first lodged in January 2006 and decided in October 2007 but by then Mr Hanson was no longer representing the claimants.

== Sexual assault, arrest, and conviction ==
On November 1, 2007, Hanson pleaded guilty to two counts of sexual assault in the second degree; two counts of risk of injury to a minor child; one charge of possession of child pornography in the first degree; and two counts of tampering with a witness.

He received a total effective sentence of twenty-five years execution suspended after he served six years incarceration followed by thirty years of probation. Prior to his sentencing Hanson attempted to withdraw his "guilty" plea, claiming, in part, that he didn't understand the criminal charges lodged against him and the court had failed to adequately apprise him of the sentencing range related to those charges during a process known as plea canvassing. The trial court judge denied his motion orally; later, the Appellate Court officially released a written opinion that upheld the decision.
