= William Erbey =

American entrepreneur

- Citizenship: American
- Education: Harvard Business School
- Occupation: American businessman

William Erbey is an American businessman and the founder of Ocwen Financial Corporation. Erbey made billions during the subprime mortgage crisis by positioning Ocwen to take advantage of larger banks leaving the market; however, he later lost much of his wealth amid allegations of frequent legal violations and conflicts of interest by the company. In 2014, these conflicts of interest led to Erbey's resignation from Ocwen's board as part of a settlement with the New York Department of Financial Services.

== Ocwen Financial Corporation ==
Erbey was the founder of Ocwen Financial Corporation, a mortgage services company that made large amounts of money during the subprime mortgage crisis. In 2014, he stepped down as board chairman as part of a settlement with the New York Department of Financial Services, and resigned from positions at several related companies, over what the New York regulator called "serious conflicts of interest." Erbey chaired, and was the largest stakeholder for, four companies which had close business relationships with Ocwen; by directing default-related business to these companies. Erbey was able to profit by putting borrowers in default used backdated letters to borrowers to make it appear as if they had not replied in the required timeframe. The company subsequently violated over a thousand of its other legal obligations. As part of his resignation, Erbey received a lump-sum payment of $1.2 million dollars from Ocwen.

Erbey has attributed what happened to his company to a "concerted smear campaign" by PIMCO and BlackRock, which he sued in 2017.
