= Paul Ngobeni =

American lawyer

Paul Mpande Ngobeni (born 1 September 1960) is a South African lawyer who qualified and practised in the United States until 2005. Ngobeni litigated many published cases, including the Ocwen class action which was settled out of court for an undisclosed sum. However, in 2005, Ngobeni was suspended from practice in Connecticut after 17 counts of misconduct involving 16 clients were brought against him. Ngobeni was initially disbarred but the judgment was reopened and he was later allowed to resign. Ngobeni was then disbarred in Massachusetts on the basis of reciprocal discipline. Ngobeni returned to South Africa in 2007 where he served on a 'dream team' advising the African National Congress on a legal strategy for defending South African President Jacob Zuma against corruption charges.

== Early years and legal career ==
Ngobeni was born in Lydenburg, Transvaal Province, South Africa on 1 September 1960.

He went to the United States on a scholarship in 1982 graduated with a BA from Hamilton College, New York, and a JD from New York University School of Law. Ngobeni was admitted to practise law in the state of Connecticut in December 1989 and to the State of Massachusetts on 14 June 1990

== Legal career (US) ==
During his practice in the United States, Ngobeni litigated many cases that have been published and others that were, for the most part, cases of first impression, such as the case of Scott v. Robert Jamison, et al. where he (unsuccessfully) defended Robert Jamison against complaints from Juliet Scott that she was physically and verbally assaulted and harassed, denied equal services, and threatened with eviction on the basis of her race and colour and of her children's race and colour in violation of General Statutes § 46a-64c(a) and Title VIII of the Civil Rights Act of 1968, as amended, 42 U.S.C. 3601 et seq.

=== Ocwen class action ===
In 2002, Kweku Hanson, a fellow Connecticut attorney, initiated a class-action suit against Ocwen Federal FSB of West Palm Beach, Florida, and he was represented in this by Ngobeni. The 123-page lawsuit in Hanson v. Ocwen Federal Bank outlines a six-year running battle over late charges and fees.

"It is clear that this is a pattern and practice of sheer piracy," Hanson said in an interview. He was joined in the suit by 57 individuals who claimed to have been injured by Ocwen. The lawsuit sought $1.5 billion in punitive and exemplary damages, but was settled out of court for an undisclosed sum.

=== Apartheid class action ===
During 2003, Ngobeni and Hanson represented three plaintiffs who claimed to represent "all persons who lived in South Africa between 1948 and the present and who suffered damages as a result of apartheid." Punitive and compensatory damages in excess $400 billion were claimed from a "slew" of multinational corporations (including IBM, Citigroup, GE, DuPont and many others) that did business in apartheid South Africa for violations of international law subject to suit in United States federal district court under the Alien Tort Claims Act, 28 U.S.C. § 1350 ("ATCA"), and other jurisdictional provisions.

The Southern District Court of New York under Judge John E. Sprizzo found for defendants' motion to dismiss the complaint. That finding was partially vacated by the US Court of Appeal (Second Circuit) in an appeal first lodged in January 2006 and decided in October 2007 but by then Mr Ngobeni was no longer representing the claimants, and Kweku Hanson was facing his own legal difficulties.

=== Disbarment ===
In 2005, an application was filed in Connecticut to suspend Ngobeni alleging that he "pose[d] a substantial threat of irreparable harm to his clients or to prospective clients." After he failed to appear for the hearing, his interim suspension was ordered. In 2006, a petition was filed in Massachusetts for reciprocal discipline.

In 2006, Ngobeni was temporary suspended when he failed to respond. Later that year, the disciplinary counsel filed a presentment in the Connecticut Superior Court alleging 17 counts of misconduct involving 16 separate clients. The amended presentment alleged that he took fees without providing services, was incompetent, lacked diligence, failed to communicate with clients, engaged in misrepresentation and deceit, failed to explain an overdraft in his clients' funds account, failed to safeguard clients' funds, and failed to respond to requests for information from the Connecticut bar discipline authorities.

On 14 August 2007, Ngobeni returned to South Africa and failed to attend a Connecticut Superior Court hearing on 17 October 2007, at which the judge entered an order disbarring Ngobeni for a period of thirteen years. On 29 November 2007, Ngobeni attended a subsequent hearing to consider his resignation from the Connecticut bar. Ngobeni tendered his resignation saying indicated that he intended to return to South Africa and not practice law in the United States again, that he, therefore, wished to avoid "lengthy appeals or prolonged proceedings" but his resignation did not constituted an admission of guilt or address his objections on the grounds of jurisdiction. The assistant disciplinary counsel similarly stated that she was not conceding the issues raised but agreed to the judgment being opened for the sole purpose of allowing Ngobeni to submit his resignation and waiver because his resignation would mean he would never again practice in the state and therefore the goals of attorney discipline would still be met. The judge then vacated the order of disbarment and accepted the respondent's resignation and waiver of future reinstatement.

Ngobeni did not, however, report his disbarment or subsequent resignation to bar counsel in Massachusetts who, on being apprised of the Connecticut disbarment through other sources, filed a petition for reciprocal discipline. A copy of this pleading was sent to Paul Ngobeni in South Africa, who opposed the petition. Because he resided in South Africa, a telephone hearing was scheduled but Ngobeni couldn't be reached on the day so the judge considered the matter on the papers. In his view, the rules of the court did not given him "authority to disbar the respondent or deem that he has resigned from the bar of the Commonwealth."

However, the Supreme Judicial Court found that a reciprocal sanction could be imposed on an attorney who, with disciplinary charges pending in another jurisdiction, resigned from practice there without making admissions or having a finding made of misconduct, and, disbarred Paul Ngobeni from practicing in Massachusetts. The court emphasized the policy concerns that if "an attorney [could] permanently resign in another State in the face of serious allegations of misconduct—here involving multiple clients—but do so without admission of misconduct... it would "tend to undermine public confidence in the effectiveness of attorney disciplinary procedures and threaten harm to the administration of justice and to innocent clients."

On 16 May 2011, the Supreme Court of the United States issued an order also disbarring him from practice in that court.

== South African legal career ==
Ngobeni returned to South Africa in 2007. There he served on a 'dream team' advising the African National Congress on constitutional law matters where he assisted in designing the legal strategy for defending South African President Jacob Zuma against corruption charges.

He also worked as the deputy registrar of legal services at the University of Cape Town (UCT) and as a consultant for the South African Ministry of Housing on various legal matters, including transformation.
