= American Financial Services Association =

Logo of the American Financial Services Association.

American Financial Services Association (AFSA) is a trade association for the U.S. consumer credit industry headquartered in Washington, D.C. AFSA’s 450 members include consumer and commercial finance companies, vehicle finance/leasing companies, mortgage lenders, credit card issuers, industrial banks and industry suppliers. AFSA is a founding member of Americans Well-informed on Automobile Retailing Economics. Bill Himpler currently serves as the President & CEO.

== History ==
The association was founded in 1916 as the American Association of Small Loan Brokers. The group was formed to promote state laws that would make small loans more readily available to average Americans, who had few options at the time to receive small personal loans. The association changed names several times throughout the years before its merger in 1971 with the American Industrial Bankers Association, an organization of industrial banks, thrift and loan companies, and sales finance companies. By 1983, the association’s members included diversified financial services firms and consumer credit subsidiaries of retailing firms, prompting another name change to the American Financial Services Association, which it is still known as today.

== AFSA Education Foundation ==
The AFSA Education Foundation (AFSAEF) is a non-profit AFSA affiliate with the mission to help consumers realize the benefits of responsible money management, understand the credit process and seek help if credit problems occur. AFSAEF offers a number of free publications for consumers on topics from holiday spending to vehicle financing. MoneySKILL is a free online personal finance course for high school students on money management fundamentals.
