= Rohit Chopra =

American consumer advocate (born 1982)

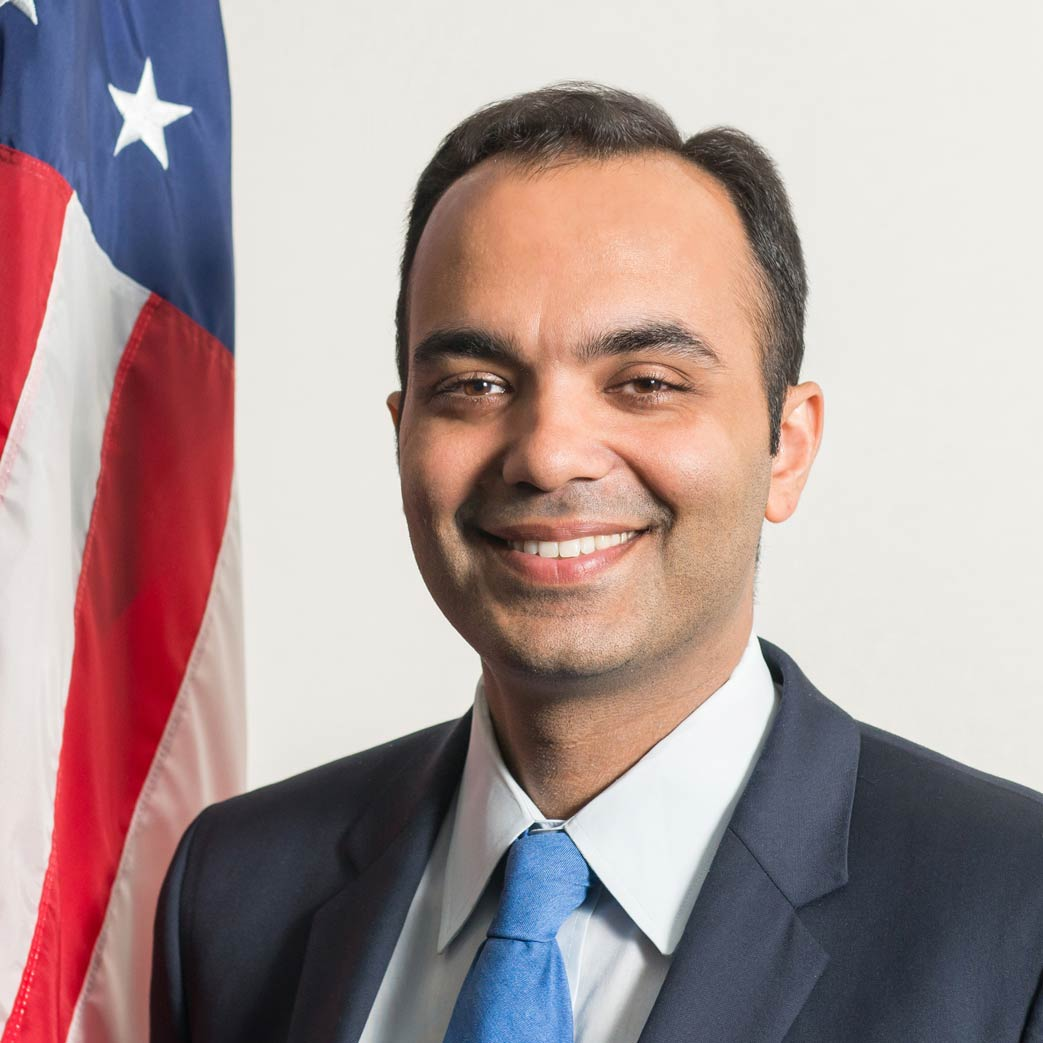

3rd Director of the Consumer Financial Protection Bureau
- In office October 12, 2021 – February 1, 2025
- President: Joe Biden; Donald Trump
- Deputy: Zixta Martinez
- Preceded by: Kathy Kraninger
- Succeeded by: Zixta Martinez (acting)

Commissioner of the Federal Trade Commission
- In office May 2, 2018 – October 12, 2021
- President: Donald Trump; Joe Biden
- Preceded by: Joshua D. Wright
- Succeeded by: Alvaro Bedoya

Personal details
- Born: January 30, 1982 (age 44) Plainfield, New Jersey, U.S.
- Party: Democratic
- Education: Harvard University (BA); University of Pennsylvania (MBA)

Rohit Chopra (born January 30, 1982) is an American consumer advocate who was the third director of the Consumer Financial Protection Bureau (CFPB) and previous member of the Federal Trade Commission (FTC). Prior to this, Chopra served as assistant director of the CFPB and as the agency's first Student Loan Ombudsman, an office created by the Dodd–Frank Act.

In 2017, President Donald Trump nominated Chopra to fill the open Democratic seat on the Federal Trade Commission (FTC). Chopra was confirmed by a voice vote of the U.S. Senate, unanimously, and was sworn in on May 2, 2018. As a member of the FTC, Chopra supported agency efforts to scrutinize the practices of Big Tech companies including Google and Facebook.

Considered an ally of Senator Elizabeth Warren, under whom he served at the CFPB, Chopra favors stronger oversight of banks and other financial institutions. In 2021, he was chosen by President Joe Biden to serve as Director of the Consumer Financial Protection Bureau. Chopra is closely associated with efforts to reform the system of student loans in the United States.

In May 2026, Governor Gavin Newsom announced Chopra would be appointed to serve as Secretary of the California Business and Consumer Services Agency.

== Education and early career ==
Chopra was born January 30, 1982, to an Indian-American family in Plainfield, New Jersey. Chopra graduated from Harvard University in 2004, where he earned his Bachelor of Arts and served as president of the student body. According to The Wall Street Journal, Chopra was known by Harvard students for his "hard-charging style" with a "reputation for being a fierce advocate not afraid to clash with faculty interests". While at Harvard, Chopra was resident of Adams House.

After graduating from Harvard, Chopra attended the Wharton School of the University of Pennsylvania, where he received a Master of Business Administration in 2009. Chopra was a recipient of a Fulbright Fellowship to South Korea. Before entering government, he worked at McKinsey & Company, a global management consultancy firm.

== Early government career ==
=== Consumer Financial Protection Bureau (CFPB) ===
After the 2008 financial crisis and the passage of the Dodd–Frank Wall Street Reform and Consumer Protection Act ("Dodd-Frank"), Chopra worked on the implementation team that resulted in the creation of the Consumer Financial Protection Bureau (CFPB). At the CFPB, Chopra served as the agency's Student Loan Ombudsman and as the agency's assistant director. During his tenure, the agency sued for-profit colleges Corinthian Colleges and ITT Educational Services, both of which dissolved.

Chopra is a vocal critic of the mounting levels of student loan debt in the United States. In 2012, he released analysis revealing that outstanding student debt exceeded $1 trillion. Chopra co-authored a report with Holly Petraeus that uncovered a student loan overcharging scheme impacting members of the military. Chopra explained his focus on student loan policy to the Wall Street Journal, stating:

In my job, every day I get calls, emails, letters from people who are drowning in debt. I hear the panic in their voices as they worry about their financial future. They aren’t numbers on a spreadsheet. I want to help make things better for them.

=== Post-CFPB career ===
In 2016, Chopra joined the Department of Education as a senior advisor, where he worked under Under Secretary of Education Ted Mitchell. Later in 2016, Chopra was named by Democratic presidential nominee Hillary Clinton as a member of her prepared presidential transition team, though her candidacy was ultimately unsuccessful.

Chopra later became a Senior Fellow at the Consumer Federation of America (CFA), a consumer advocacy group. In 2017, Chopra released a report showing that over 1 million Americans defaulted on a student loan in 2016.

== Federal Trade Commission (FTC) ==
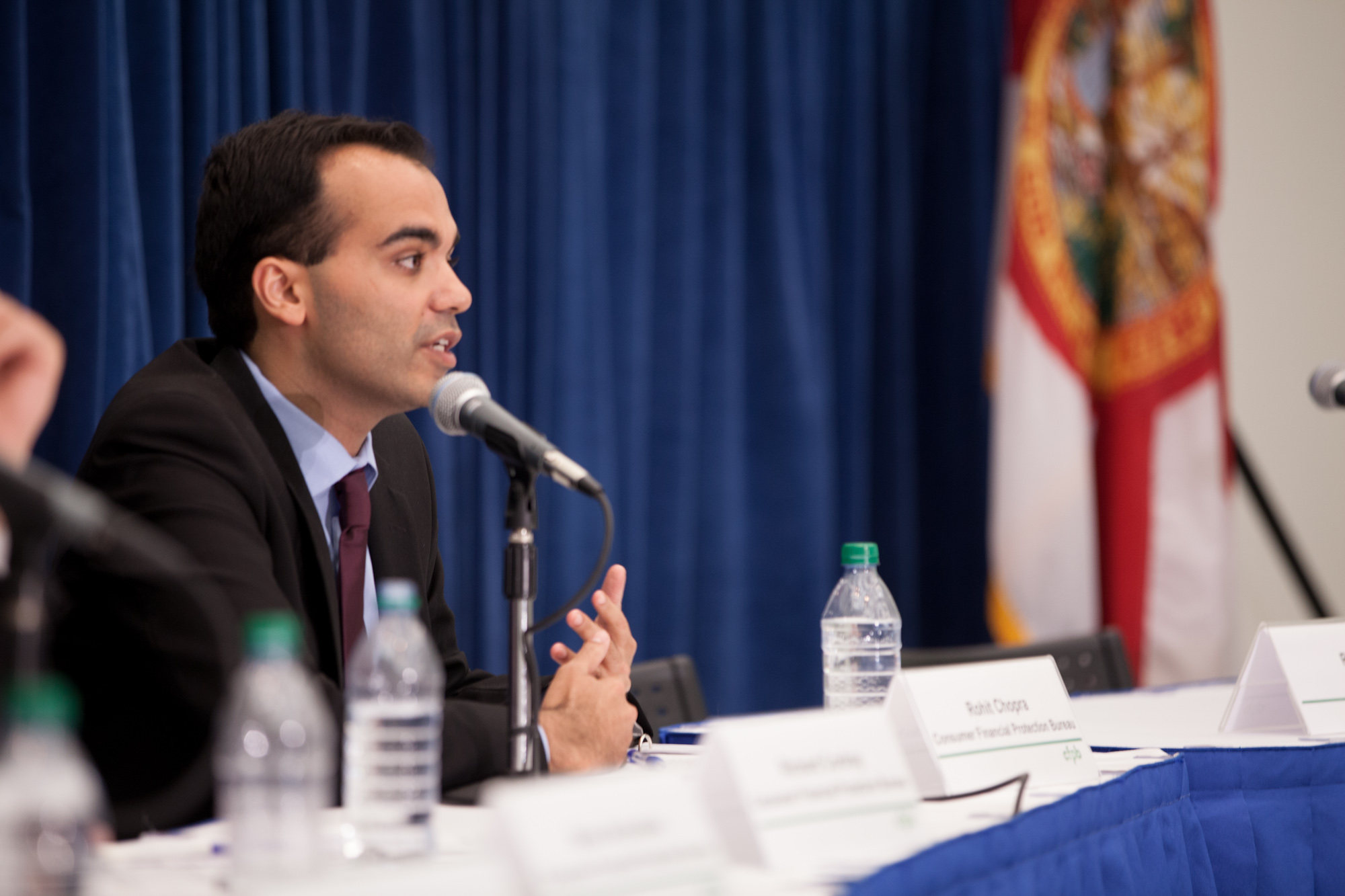
Chopra discussing the impact of student debt at a field hearing in Miami, Florida, in 2013

In 2017, Chopra was recommended by Senate Minority Leader Chuck Schumer to fill the open Democratic seat on the Federal Trade Commission (FTC). Chopra was formally nominated to the position by President Donald Trump, and was unanimously confirmed by the Senate on April 26, 2018. Chopra officially took office on May 2, 2018. Upon taking office, Chopra became the second Asian-American to serve on the FTC, after Dennis Yao, who served from 1991 to 1994.

During his time on the FTC, Chopra has supported efforts to scrutinize the business practices of "Big Tech" companies such as Google and Facebook. In 2020, Chopra opposed the FTC's $170 million child privacy settlement with Google, arguing that the company was not sufficiently reprimanded for its actions. Chopra had previously opposed the agency's $5 billion settlement with Facebook following a probe of the company's data practices on similar grounds, believing it was an insufficient penalty.

Chopra has stated that the federal government should "investigate how technology platforms may be a threat to our civil rights and the goals of fairness we seek in our society." In 2020, Chopra co-authored a paper with Lina Khan, his former legal advisor, in the University of Chicago Law Review titled "The Case for 'Unfair Methods of Competition' Rulemaking".

== Director of the Consumer Financial Protection Bureau (CFPB) ==
=== Nomination ===
During the 2020 presidential election, Chopra was mentioned as a possible candidate for a Cabinet position in a Biden administration. Chopra was mentioned as a contender for the position of Secretary of Commerce by Politico and the New York Times, but was ultimately nominated to serve as director of the Consumer Financial Protection Bureau (CFPB). Alvaro Bedoya, then Director of the Center on Privacy and Technology, was confirmed as Chopra's replacement at the FTC.

Chopra's nomination was praised by Senator Elizabeth Warren, who stated through her Twitter account that "I worked closely with Rohit [Chopra] to set up the CFPB and fight for America's students. It’s terrific that President-elect Biden picked Rohit to run the [CFPB]." Chopra was confirmed 50–48 on September 30, 2021. Vice President Kamala Harris cast a tie-breaking vote on the Senate's motion to invoke cloture on Chopra's nomination.

=== Tenure ===
As CFPB director, Chopra served as an ex officio member of the Federal Deposit Insurance Corporation (FDIC). While in office, Chopra scrutinized Big Tech companies' expansion into the payments sector. In one of his first acts in the position, Chopra ordered a probe into Amazon, Apple, Facebook, Google, PayPal and Block, Inc.-developed platform Square. As CFPB director, Chopra had also scrutinized bank overdraft fees.

In October 2022, Chopra announced that the agency would begin data-sharing rulemaking on Section 1033 of the Dodd–Frank Act, which pertains to open banking. In October 2023, the CFPB formally released its Section 1033 proposal, which if implemented would require banks to give consumers their financial data free of charge. The rule would forbid companies with access to users' personal financial information from collecting the data for targeted advertising.

On February 1, 2025, Trump fired Chopra as part of the change in administration.

=== Controversies ===
Under Chopra's watch, the CFPB has been the subject of some controversies. A lawsuit in 2022 by the American Bankers Association and six other trade groups claimed Chopra was acting in a matter exceeding the agency's legal authority, which a The Wall Street Journal investigation suggested was a mechanism to increase clout at the FTC and FDIC for the purpose of amassing power over businesses, banks, and consumers.

In 2023 the agency allowed a CFPB data breach in which an employee, since discharged, surreptitiously transferred CFPB-held personal information for 256,000 consumers from forty-five financial institutions to a personal email account, in what the agency termed a "major [data breach] incident", an event that led to Congressional investigation.

In January 2024, the agency settled a class action lawsuit brought by minority employees and women against Acting Director Mick Mulvaney in 2018. The employees alleged that they were discriminated against by the agency, which included being consistently paid less than their White male colleagues, being unfairly denied promotions, and facing retaliation for making discrimination complaints. As part of the settlement, the agency agreed to pay $6 million towards a settlement fund. The agency did not admit wrongdoing as part of the settlement.

The agency under Chopra failed, for the first time in its history, to reach agreement with the National Treasury Employees Union (NTEU) Chapter 335, which resulted in employees having to work without a contract beginning on December 31, 2023. Agency employees are now the only federal workers who haven't received a raise or local cost-of-living increase in 2024, after President Biden authorized an average 5.2% pay raise for federal employees, the largest since the Carter administration. The dispute centers on raising the salary ranges (pay bands) and the salary cap for workers, which the agency has thus far refused to do, despite agreeing in December 2022 to include pay bands and salary cap increases in this round of negotiations and Chopra raising the pay cap for agency executives in December 2023, some of whom are now paid as much as $269,000 a year. By law, the Dodd-Frank Act provides that the agency has to maintain comparability as to compensation and benefits, not only with the Federal Reserve, but with the Federal Deposit Insurance Corporation (FDIC), the Comptroller of the Currency (OCC), and the Securities and Exchange Commission (SEC), among others. The union says that raising pay bands and salary caps is needed to complying with the act, since the Federal Reserve, OCC, and SEC raise these items annually and many already have substantially higher caps than the CFPB. On March 27, 2024, the National President of NTEU sent Chopra a letter, accusing him of avoiding all communication with union leadership, as negotiations drag on and remain stalled.

Government offices
Preceded by Kathy Kraninger	Director of the Consumer Financial Protection Bureau; 2021–2025	Succeeded by Jonathan McKernan; Nominee
Preceded by Joshua D. Wright	Commissioner of the Federal Trade Commission; 2018–2021	Succeeded by Alvaro Bedoya
