= Alternative Mortgage Transaction Parity Act of 1982 =

The Alternative Mortgage Transaction Parity Act of 1982, also known as AMTPA, preempts state laws that restrict banks from making any mortgage except conventional fixed rate amortizing mortgages. AMTPA was contained in title VIII of the Garn–St. Germain Depository Institutions Act passed in 1982

Mortgages allowed by the act included:

- Adjustable-rate mortgages, in which the interest rate becomes floating after a number of years.
- Balloon payment mortgages have a large payment remaining when the loan comes due.
- Interest-only mortgages only require the borrower to pay the interest on the principal balance for the first years of the loan.

The United States House of Representatives passed H.R.3915 "The Mortgage Reform and Anti-Predatory Lending Act of 2007" in November, 2007. It remains before the United States Senate. The House bill would require lenders to write mortgages that take into account the borrowers' ability to pay at the fully indexed rate.

== See also ==
- Financing
- Refinancing
- Bridge financing
- Promissory note
- Loan origination
- Subprime lending
- Subprime mortgage crisis
