= Real Estate Settlement Procedures Act =

US law protecting homeowners

- Long title: Real Estate Settlement Procedures Act of 1974
- Acronyms (colloquial): RESPA
- Enacted by: the 93rd United States Congress
- Effective: Dec. 22, 1974

Citations
- Public law: P.L. 93-533
- Statutes at Large: 88 Stat. 1724

Codification
- Titles amended: 12
- U.S.C. sections created: 2601-2617

Legislative history
- Passed the Senate on July 24, 1974 (unanimous consent); Passed the House of Representatives on August 14, 1974 (unanimous consent); Reported by the joint conference committee on Dec. 9, 1974; agreed to by the Senate on Dec. 9, 1974 (unanimous consent) and by the House of Representatives on Dec. 11, 1974 (unanimous consent); Signed into law by President Gerald Ford on Dec. 22, 1974

Major amendments
- P.L. 94-205, 89 Stat. 1157 (1976)

The Real Estate Settlement Procedures Act (RESPA) was a law passed by the United States Congress in 1974 and codified as Title 12, Chapter 27 of the United States Code, 12 U.S.C. §§ 2601–2617. The main objective was to protect homeowners by assisting them in becoming better educated while shopping for real estate services, and eliminating kickbacks and referral fees which add unnecessary costs to settlement services. RESPA requires lenders and others involved in mortgage lending to provide borrowers with pertinent and timely disclosures regarding the nature and costs of a real estate settlement process. RESPA was also designed to prohibit potentially abusive practices such as kickbacks and referral fees, the practice of dual tracking, and imposes limitations on the use of escrow accounts.

== History ==
RESPA was enacted in 1974 and was originally administered by the Department of Housing and Urban Development (HUD). In 2011, the Consumer Financial Protection Bureau (CFPB), created under the provisions of the Dodd-Frank Wall Street Reform and Consumer Protection Act, assumed the enforcement and rulemaking authority over RESPA. On December 31, 2013, the CFPB published final rules implementing provisions of the Dodd-Frank Act, which direct the CFPB to publish a single, integrated disclosure for mortgage transactions, which included mortgage disclosure requirements under the Truth in Lending Act (TILA) and sections 4 and 5 of RESPA. As a result, Regulation Z now houses the integrated forms, timing, and related disclosure requirements for most closed-end consumer mortgage loans.

== Purpose ==
RESPA was created because various companies associated with the buying and selling of real estate, such as lenders, real estate agents, construction companies and title insurance companies were often engaging in providing undisclosed kickbacks to each other, inflating the costs of real estate transactions and obscuring price competition by facilitating bait-and-switch tactics.

For example, a lender advertising a home loan might have advertised the loan with a 5% interest rate, but then when one applies for the loan one is told that one must use the lender's affiliated title insurance company and pay $5,000 for the service, whereas the normal rate is $1,000. The title company would then have paid $4,000 to the lender. This was made illegal, in order to make prices for the services clear so as to allow price competition by consumer demand and to thereby drive down prices.

== General Requirements ==
RESPA outlines requirements that lenders must follow when providing mortgages that are secured by federally related mortgage loans. This includes home purchase loans, refinancing, lender approved assumptions, property improvement loans, equity lines of credit, and reverse mortgages.

Under RESPA, lending institutions must:

- Provide certain disclosures when applicable, including a Good-Faith Estimate of Settlement Costs (GFE), Special Information Booklet, HUD-1/1A settlement statement and Mortgage Servicing Disclosures.
- Provide the ability to compare the GFE to the HUD-1/1a settlement statements at closing
- Follow established escrow accounting practices
- Not proceed with the foreclosure process when the borrower has submitted a complete application for loss mitigation options, and
- Not pay kickbacks or pay referral fees to settlement service providers (e.g., appraisers, real estate brokers/agents and title companies)

== Good-Faith Estimate of Settlement Costs ==
For closed-end reverse mortgages, a lender or broker is required to provide the consumer with the standard Good Faith Estimate (GFE) form. A Good Faith Estimate of settlement costs is a three-page document that shows estimates for the costs that the borrower will likely incur at settlement and related loan information. It is designed to allow borrowers to shop for a mortgage loan by comparing settlement costs and loan terms. These costs include, but are not limited to:

- Origination charges
- Estimates for required services (e.g., appraisals, credit report fees, flood certification)
- Title insurance
- Per diem interest
- Escrow deposits, and
- Insurance premiums

The bank or mortgage broker must provide the GFE no later than three business days after the lender or mortgage broker received an application, or information sufficient to complete and application, the application.

== Kickbacks and Unearned Fees ==
A person may not give or receive a fee or anything of value for a referral of mortgage loan settlement business. This includes an agreement or understanding related to a federally related mortgage. Fees paid for mortgage-related services must be disclosed. Additionally, no person may give or receive any portion, split, or percentage of a fee for services connected with a federally related mortgage except for services actually performed.

Permissible Compensation

- A payment to an attorney for services actually rendered;
- A payment by a title company to its agent for services actually performed in the issuance of title insurance;
- A payment by a lender to its duly appointed agent or contractor for services actually performed in the origination, processing, or funding of a loan;
- A payment to a cooperative brokerage and referral arrangements between real estate agents and real estate brokers. (The statutory exemption stated in this paragraph refers only to fee divisions within real estate brokerage arrangements when all parties are acting in a real estate brokerage capacity. "Blanket" referral fee agreements between real estate brokers are outlawed in the United States by virtue of Section 1 of the Sherman Antitrust Act of 1890);
- Normal promotional and education activities that are not conditioned on the referral of business, and do not involve the defraying of expenses that otherwise would be incurred by a person in a position to refer settlement services; and
- An employer's payment to its own employees for any referral activities.

It is the responsibility of the lender to monitor third party fees in relationship to the services rendered to ensure no illegal kickbacks or referral fees are made.

== Borrower Requests for Information and Notifications of Errors ==
Upon receipt of a qualified written request, a mortgage servicer is required to take certain steps, each of which is subject to certain deadlines. The servicer must acknowledge receipt of the request within 5 business days. The servicer then has 30 business days (from the request) to take action on the request. The servicer has to either provide a written notification that the error has been corrected, or provide a written explanation as to why the servicer believes the account is correct. Either way, the servicer has to provide the name and telephone number of a person with whom the borrower can discuss the matter. The servicer cannot provide information to any credit agency regarding any overdue payment during the 60-day period.

If the servicer fails to comply with the "qualified written request", the borrower is entitled to actual damages, up to $2,000 of additional damages if there is a pattern of noncompliance, costs and attorneys fees.

== Criticisms ==
Critics say that kickbacks still occur. For example, lenders often provide captive insurance to the title insurance companies they work with, which critics say is essentially a kickback mechanism. Others counter that economically the transaction is a zero sum game, where if the kickback were forbidden, a lender would simply charge higher prices. To which others counter that the intended goal of the legislation is transparency, which it would provide if the lender must absorb the cost of the hidden kickback into the fee they charge. One of the core elements of the debate is the fact that customers overwhelmingly go with the default service providers associated with a lender or a real estate agent, even though they sign documents explicitly stating that they can choose to use any service provider.

There have been various proposals to modify the Real Estate Settlement Procedures Act. One proposal is to change the "open architecture" system currently in place, where a customer can choose to use any service provider for each service, to one where the services are bundled, but where the real estate agent or lender must pay directly for all other costs. Under this system, lenders, who have more buying power, would more aggressively seek the lowest price for real estate settlement services.

While both the HUD-1 and HUD-1A serve to disclose all fees, costs and charges to both the buyer and seller involved in a real estate transaction, it is not uncommon to find mistakes on the HUD. Both buyer and seller should know how to properly read a HUD before closing a transaction and at settlement is not the ideal time to discover unnecessary charges and/or exorbitant fees as the transaction is about to be closed. Buyers or sellers can hire an experienced professional such as a real estate agent or an attorney to protect their interests at closing.
