= 3rd Ohio General Assembly =

| ← | 2nd | 4th | → |
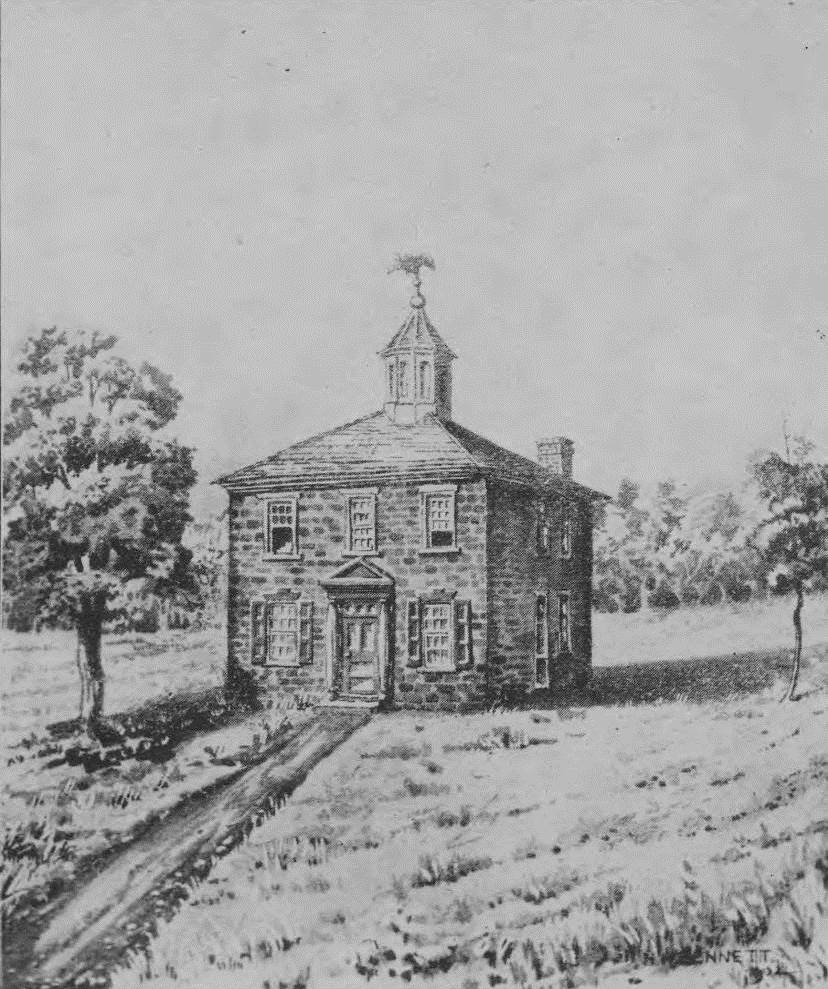
- Ohio's first statehouse at Chillicothe (1800)

Overview
- Meeting place: Chillicothe, Ohio, USA
- Term: December 3, 1804 – December 1, 1805

Ohio Senate
- Members: 14
- Speaker of the Senate: Daniel Symmes (D-R) (until Feb. 21, 1805); James Pritchard (D-R)
- Party control: Democratic-Republican Party

House of Representatives
- Members: 30
- House Speaker: Michael Baldwin (D-R)
- Party control: Democratic-Republican Party

Sessions
- 1st: December 3, 1804 – February 22, 1805

The Third Ohio General Assembly was the third meeting of the Ohio state legislature, composed of the Ohio State Senate and the Ohio House of Representatives. It convened in Chillicothe, Ohio, on December 3, 1804, and adjourned February 22, 1805. This General Assembly coincided with the last year of Edward Tiffin's first term as Ohio Governor.

== Background ==
Under Ohio's first constitution, State Senators were elected to two year terms. Members of the House were elected for each term. Article I, section 2 and 6 of Ohio's first constitution called for an enumeration of white male inhabitants of 21 years age every four years, with the number of representatives and senators for each county apportioned by the legislature based on this census. Article I, section 3 called for elections the second Tuesday in October.

Daniel Symmes of Hamilton County was elected Speaker of the Senate on December 8, 1804. In February 1805, Symmes was appointed by the legislature to fill the vacancy on the Ohio Supreme Court created by the resignation of Return J. Meigs, Jr., who had been appointed to the Louisiana Supreme Court. Symmes was succeeded in the speakership by James Pritchard of Jefferson County on February 21. The Senate Clerk was Thomas Scott and the Senate Doorkeeper was Edward Sherlock.

Michael Baldwin of Ross County was elected Speaker of the House on December 5, 1804. Baldwin had previously served in that same post for the 1st Ohio General Assembly. The House Clerk was John A. Fulton and the House Doorkeeper was Adam Betz.

== State Senate ==
=== Districts ===
For this session, the legislature apportioned two senators for Warren, Ross, Jefferson and Hamilton Counties, and one senator each for Montgomery, Greene, Washington, Gallia, Muskingum, Franklin, Adams, Scioto, Columbiana, Clermont, Fairfield, Trumbull and Belmont Counties.

=== Members ===
| District | Senator | Party | notes |
|---|---|---|---|
| Adams; Scioto | Thomas Kirker | Democratic-Republican | |
| Belmont | William Vance | | |
| Clermont | James Sargent | Democratic-Republican | |
| Fairfield | Robert F. Slaughter | | |
| Hamilton | Cornelius Snider | | |
| Hamilton | Daniel Symmes | Democratic-Republican | elected Speaker of the Senate |
| Jefferson; Columbiana | John Milligan | Democratic-Republican | |
| Jefferson; Columbiana | James Pritchard | Democratic-Republican | elected Speaker of the Senate after Symmes resigned |
| Ross; Franklin | Abraham Claypool | | |
| Ross; Franklin | Joseph Kerr | Democratic-Republican | |
| Trumbull | George Tod | Democratic-Republican | |
| Warren; Montgomery; Greene | John Bigger | Democratic-Republican | |
| Warren; Montgomery; Greene | William Schenck | Federalist | |
| Washington; Gallia; Muskingum | Joseph Buell | Democratic-Republican | |

== Ohio House of Representatives ==
=== Districts ===
For this session, the legislature apportioned four representatives for Ross and Franklin Counties, three representatives each for Adams and Scioto Counties, Jefferson County and Hamilton County, two representatives each for Belmont, Butler, Fairfield, Trumbull and Warren Counties, and Washington and Gallia Counties, and one representative each for Columbiana, Clermont, Greene, and Montgomery Counties, and Washington and Muskingum Counties.

=== Members ===
| District | Representatives | Party | notes |
|---|---|---|---|
| Adams; Scioto | Philip Lewis | | |
| Adams; Scioto | Abraham Shepherd | Democratic-Republican | |
| Adams; Scioto | Thomas Waller | | |
| Belmont | John Stewart | | |
| Belmont | Thomas Wilson | | |
| Butler | Ezekiel Ball | | |
| Butler | Matthew Richardson | | |
| Clermont | Robert Higgins | | |
| Columbiana | Rudolph Bair | | |
| Fairfield | William Gass | | |
| Fairfield | David Reece | | |
| Greene | John Sterritt | | |
| Hamilton | Hezekiah Price | | |
| Hamilton | Judah Willey | | |
| Hamilton | Stephen Wood | | |
| Jefferson | Thomas McCune | | |
| Jefferson | John McLaughlin | | |
| Jefferson | John Sloane | Democratic-Republican | |
| Montgomery | Daniel C. Cooper | | |
| Ross; Franklin | Michael Baldwin | Democratic-Republican | elected Speaker of the House |
| Ross; Franklin | James Dunlap | Democratic-Republican | |
| Ross; Franklin | Duncan McArthur | Federalist | |
| Ross; Franklin | William Patton | | |
| Trumbull | Homer Hine | | |
| Trumbull | Amos Spafford | | |
| Warren | Peter Burr | | |
| Warren | Matthias Corwin | Democratic-Republican | |
| Washington; Gallia | Seth Carhart | | |
| Washington; Gallia | Ezekiel Marvin | | |
| Washington; Muskingum | Elijah Hatch | | |

== Major events ==
Senator Pritchard, along with former Northwest Territory Representative and Ohio Constitution conventionalist William Goforth, and former Senate Speaker and founder of Chillicothe, Nathaniel Massie, served as presidential electors for the 1804 presidential election, and cast Ohio's electoral vote for incumbent President Thomas Jefferson, who would easily win reelection over Charles Cotesworth Pinckney.

On December 4, 1804, Governor Tiffin submitted his annual report to the bicameral assembly. Included therein was a recommendation to enact an entirely new code of criminal law, referring to the then-governing statutues of the Northwest Territorial Legislature, the precursor to the Ohio General Assembly, as "conflicting" and "ineffective".

On December 11, February 7, and February 21, joint sessions of the legislature were held to elect judges and to fill vacancies of judges throughout the state.

On January 30, 1805, the House passed a single article of impeachment against William W. Irvin, an associate judge in the Fairfield County Court of Common Pleas, for "high misdemeanor and neglect of duties". The article alleged that Judge Irvin was absent from his court for two days, leading to the suspension of all business matters therein, and the abrupt adjournment of that court. The impeachment was adopted by the Senate on February 22, and an impeachment trial was conducted before the Ohio Senate at the beginning of the 4th Ohio General Assembly.

== Major legislation ==
Following the ratification of the Twelfth Amendment to the United States Constitution in 1804, the Government of Massachusetts proposed another amendment to the Constitution to apportion members of Congress according to the number of free inhibitants in each state. On December 15, the Ohio House adopted a joint resolution deeming adoption "inexpedient". The resolution was adopted by the Ohio Senate on December 19. The Massachusetts amendment was never ratified.

The House passed "a bill to encourage the killing of wolves and panthers"and to provide bounties for the scalps of those animal's heads on February 2, 1805.

The following counties were established by the legislature during this session:

| Name | Date | Notes |
|---|---|---|
| Athens | February 20, 1805 | Detached from western Washington County. |
| Champaign | February 20, 1805 | Detached from western Franklin County and northern Greene County. |
| Highland | February 18, 1805 | Detached from western Ross County, northern Adams County, and eastern Clermont County. County was originally named 'Rockland'. |

A portion of western Gallia County was attached to Scioto County on December 29.

The first Black Codes in Ohio were established during this General Assembly through an act which devised a system in which blacks and "mulattos" could obtain residency in the state. The act required that these individuals present court-issued certificates declaring their free status from slavery to the clerk of the county in which the individual sought to reside in. It was also required that such certificates listed the individual's children, if applicable, and featured a signed bond from a white landowner. Said certificates also had to be re-presented to the county clerk on a biannual basis after the establishment of initial residency in that county. The act also prohibited any person from "harboring or secreting" a black person who did not have such a certificate on file in any court within the state, and assessed fines between $10 and $50 for each offense. The certificate was revocable if a holder of such was found guilty of a criminal offense.

== See also ==
- List of Ohio state legislatures
