= 1st Ohio General Assembly =

Initial meeting of the Ohio state legislature

2nd	→
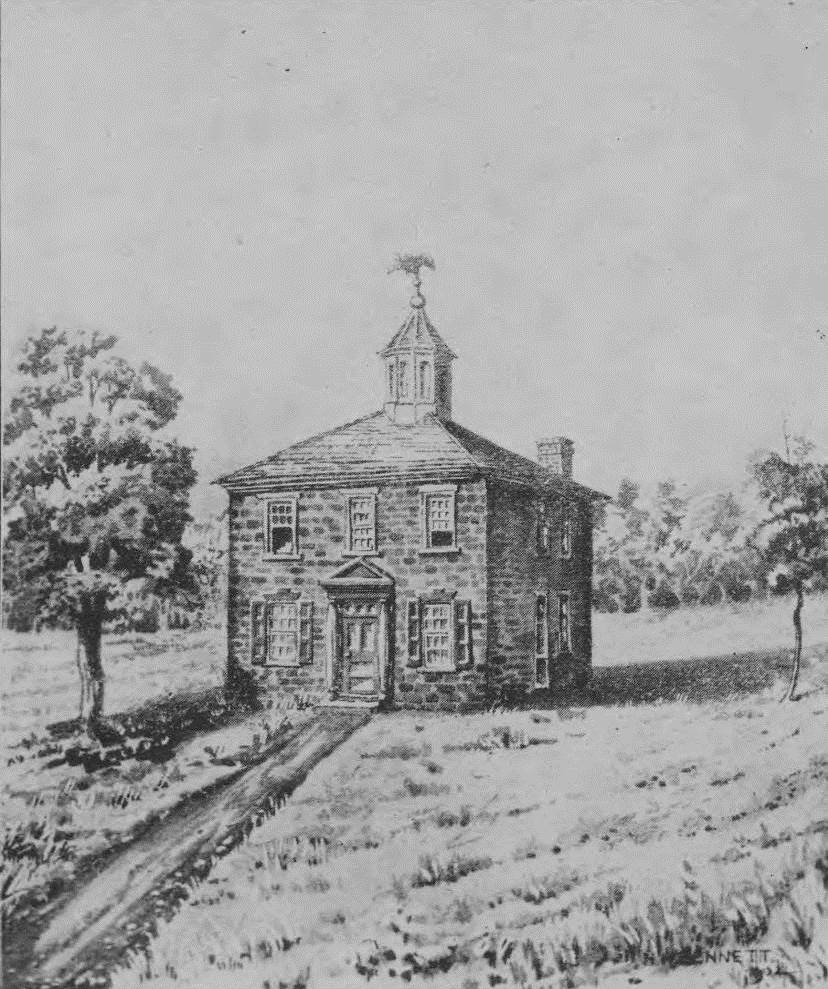
- Ohio's first statehouse at Chillicothe (1800)

Overview
- Term: March 1, 1803 – December 4, 1803

Ohio Senate
- Members: 14
- President of the Senate: Nathaniel Massie (D-R)
- Party control: Democratic-Republican Party

House of Representatives
- Members: 30
- House Speaker: Michael Baldwin (D-R)
- Party control: Democratic-Republican Party

Sessions
- 1st: March 1, 1803 – April 16, 1803

The First Ohio General Assembly was the initial meeting of the Ohio state legislature, composed of the Ohio State Senate and the Ohio House of Representatives. It convened in Chillicothe, Ohio, on March 1, 1803, and adjourned April 16, 1803. This General Assembly coincided with the first year of Edward Tiffin's first term as Ohio Governor.

== Background ==
Under Ohio's first constitution, State Senators were elected to two year terms. For the first class, half were elected for one year and half for two years. Members of the House were elected for each term. The Constitution was written in November, 1802, and submitted to the U S Congress. Elections for the first session were held in January, 1803. The apportionment of legislative districts was based on the 1802 Ohio Constitution, in section 7 of the Schedule. Subsequent sessions would be elected each October, and meet the first Monday of December.

== State Senate ==
=== Districts ===
For the first session, the constitution apportioned four senators for Hamilton County, one senator for Clermont County, one senator for Adams County, two senators for Ross County, one senator for Fairfield County, two senators for Washington County, one senator for Belmont County, two senators for Jefferson County, and one senator for Trumbull County.

=== Members ===
District	Senator	Party	notes
Adams	John Beasley		successfully contested by Joseph Darlinton
Belmont	William Vance		
Clermont	William Buchanan		
Fairfield	Robert F. Slaughter		
Hamilton	Francis Dunlavy	Democratic-Republican	
Hamilton	Jeremiah Morrow	Democratic-Republican	
Hamilton	John Paul	Democratic-Republican	
Hamilton	Daniel Symmes	Democratic-Republican	
Jefferson	Zenas Kimberly		
Jefferson	Bezaleel Wells	Federalist	
Ross	Abraham Claypool		
Ross	Nathaniel Massie	Democratic-Republican	elected Speaker of the Senate
Trumbull	Samuel Huntington	Democratic-Republican	
Washington	Joseph Buell	Democratic-Republican	

== Ohio House of Representatives ==
=== Districts ===
For the first session, the constitution apportioned eight representatives for Hamilton County, two representatives for Clermont County, three representatives for Adams County, four representatives for Ross County, two representatives for Fairfield County, three representatives for Washington County, two representatives for Belmont County, four representatives for Jefferson County, and two representatives for Trumbull County.

=== Members ===
District	Representatives	Party	notes
Adams	Thomas Kirker	Democratic-Republican	
Adams	Joseph Lucas		
Adams	William Russell		
Belmont	Joseph Sharp		
Belmont	Elijah Woods	Democratic-Republican	
Clermont	Amos Ellis		
Clermont	R. Walter Waring		
Fairfield	David Reece		
Fairfield	William A. Trimble	Democratic-Republican	
Hamilton	Thomas Brown		
Hamilton	James Dunn		
Hamilton	Robert McClure		
Hamilton	William Maxwell		
Hamilton	Thomas McFarland		
Hamilton	Ephraim Kibbey		
Hamilton	William James		
Hamilton	John Bigger		
Jefferson	Thomas Elliott		
Jefferson	Rudolph Bair	Democratic-Republican	
Jefferson	Isaac Meeks		
Jefferson	Zacheus Beatty		
Ross	Michael Baldwin	Democratic-Republican	elected Speaker of the House
Ross	Robert Culbertson		
Ross	William Patton		
Ross	Thomas Worthington	Democratic-Republican	
Trumbull	Ephraim Quimby		
Trumbull	Aaron Wheeler		
Washington	William Jackson		
Washington	Robert Safford		
Washington	Wyllys Silliman		

== Major events ==
In joint session, state officers were elected: William Creighton Jr. as Ohio Secretary of State, William McFarland as Ohio State Treasurer and Thomas Gibson as Ohio State Auditor.

John Smith and Thomas Worthington were elected United States Senators, with no record of vote made.

In joint session, local judges and three Ohio Supreme Court judges, Return Jonathan Meigs Jr., Samuel Huntington, and William Sprigg, were elected.

== Major legislation ==
Eight new counties were erected during this session:

- Butler detached from Hamilton
- Columbiana erected from parts of Jefferson and Washington
- Franklin detached from Ross
- Gallia from Ross
- Greene from parts of Hamilton and Ross
- Montgomery from Hamilton
- Scioto from Adams
- Warren from Hamilton

Existing territorial laws were recognized as in force, if not specifically invalidated.

== See also ==
- List of Ohio state legislatures
