= Thomas Corwin =

American politician (1794–1865)

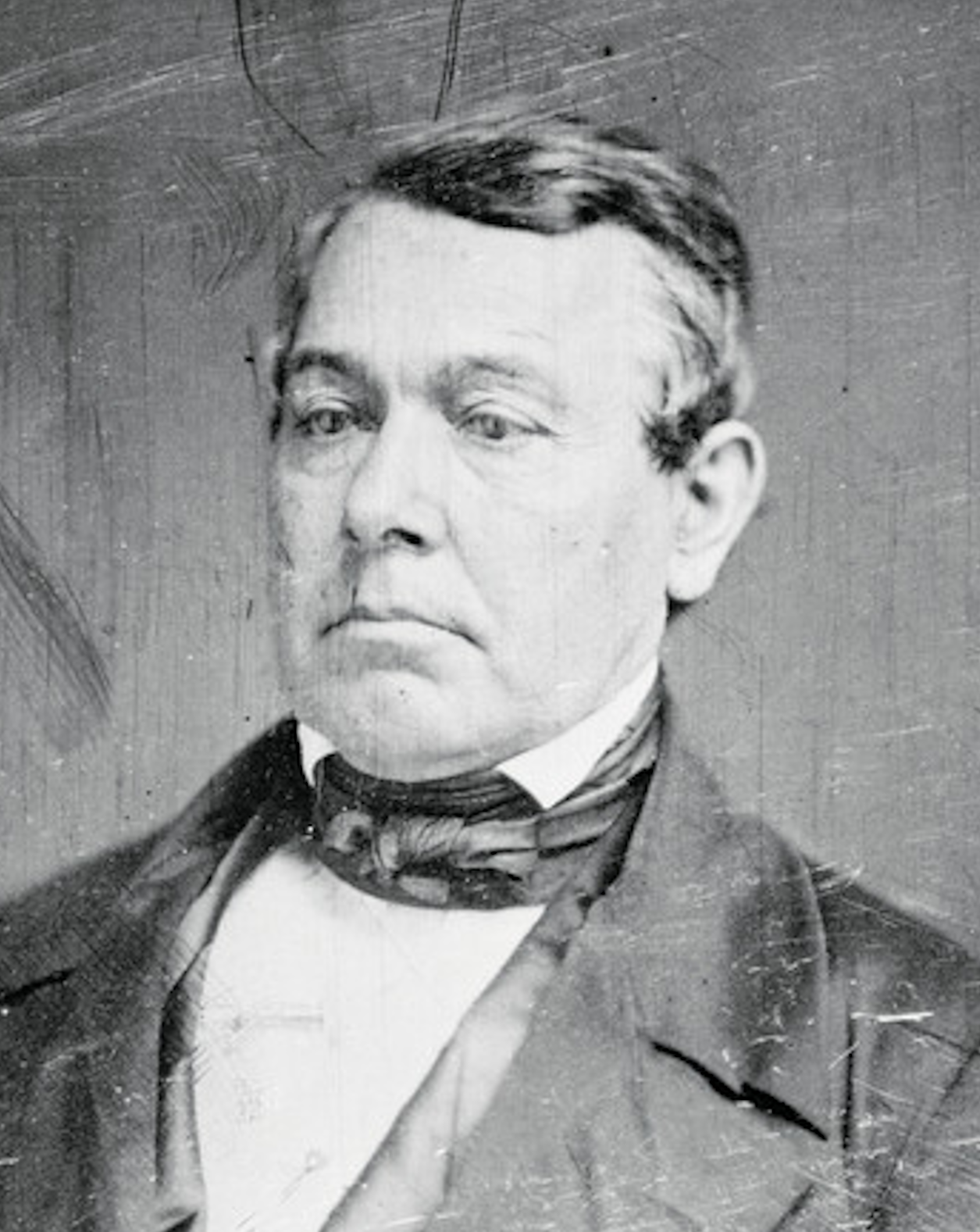
- Corwin, 1844–1860

20th United States Secretary of the Treasury
- In office July 23, 1850 – March 6, 1853
- President: Millard Fillmore; Franklin Pierce
- Preceded by: William M. Meredith
- Succeeded by: James Guthrie

United States Minister to Mexico
- In office May 21, 1861 – April 27, 1864
- President: Abraham Lincoln
- Preceded by: John B. Weller
- Succeeded by: Robert Shufelt

United States Senator from Ohio
- In office March 4, 1845 – July 20, 1850
- Preceded by: Benjamin Tappan
- Succeeded by: Thomas Ewing

15th Governor of Ohio
- In office December 16, 1840 – December 14, 1842
- Preceded by: Wilson Shannon
- Succeeded by: Wilson Shannon

Member of the U.S. House of Representatives from Ohio
- In office March 4, 1831 – May 30, 1840
- Preceded by: James Shields
- Succeeded by: Jeremiah Morrow
- Constituency: 2nd district (1831–1833); 4th district (1833–1840)
- In office March 4, 1859 – March 12, 1861
- Preceded by: Aaron Harlan
- Succeeded by: Richard A. Harrison
- Constituency: 7th district

Member of the Ohio House of Representatives from the Warren County district
- In office 1829–1830
- Preceded by: Benjamin Baldwin; James McEwen
- Succeeded by: Jacoby Halleck; Joseph Whitehill
- In office 1821–1823
- Preceded by: John Bigger; William Schenck
- Succeeded by: John Houston; David Sutton

Personal details
- Born: July 29, 1794 Bourbon County, Kentucky, U.S.
- Died: December 18, 1865 (aged 71) Washington, D.C., U.S.
- Party: Whig (Before 1858); Republican (1858–1865)
- Spouse: Sarah Ross
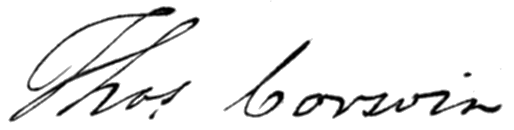
- Signature

Thomas Corwin (July 29, 1794 – December 18, 1865), also known as Tom Corwin, The Wagon Boy, and Black Tom was a politician from the state of Ohio. He represented Ohio in both houses of Congress and served as the 15th governor of Ohio and the 20th U.S. secretary of the treasury. After affiliating with the Whig Party, he joined the Republican Party in the 1850s. Corwin is best known for his sponsorship of the proposed Corwin Amendment, which was presented in an unsuccessful attempt to avoid the oncoming American Civil War.

Corwin was born in Bourbon County, Kentucky, but he grew up in Lebanon, Ohio. After serving as a wagon boy in the War of 1812, he established a legal practice in Lebanon. He became a prosecuting attorney and won election to the Ohio House of Representatives. He served in the United States House of Representatives from 1830 to 1840, resigning from Congress to take office as Ohio's governor. He was defeated for re-election in 1842 but was elected by the state legislature to the United States Senate in 1844. As a Senator, he became a prominent opponent of the Mexican–American War. He resigned from the Senate to become Secretary of the Treasury under President Millard Fillmore.

Corwin returned to the United States House of Representatives in 1859. He led the House of Representatives' effort to end the secessionist crisis that arose following the 1860 elections. Corwin sponsored a constitutional amendment that would have forbidden the federal government from outlawing slavery, even through further constitutional amendments. Though several states ratified the amendment, it did not prevent the outbreak of the civil war. Corwin resigned from Congress in March 1861 to become the United States Ambassador to Mexico. He held that position until 1864 and died the following year.

== Early life ==
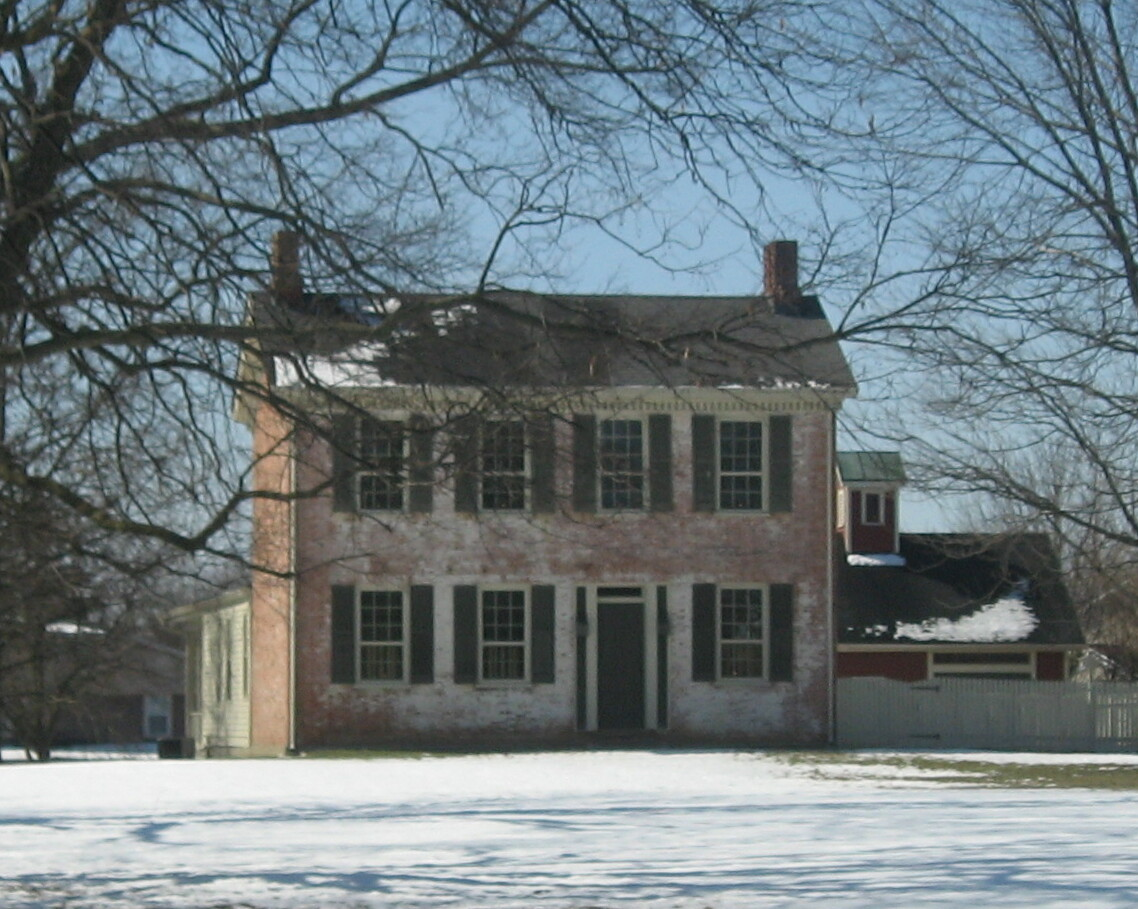
Corwin's house in Lebanon, Ohio

Corwin, son of Matthias Corwin (1761–1829) and Patience Halleck, was born in Bourbon County, Kentucky on July 29, 1794. Corwin's father served eleven times in the Ohio Legislature. Corwin's cousin Moses Bledso Corwin was a United States Congressman from Ohio, and his nephew Franklin Corwin was a United States Congressman from Illinois.

Corwin moved with his parents to Lebanon, Ohio in 1798. During the War of 1812, he served as a wagon boy in General William Henry Harrison's Army. In 1815, he began study of law in the offices of Joshua Collett, He was admitted to the bar in 1817, commencing practice in Lebanon; he was prosecuting attorney of Warren County from 1818 to 1828. On November 13, 1822, he married Sarah Ross, sister of Thomas R. Ross, then a member of Congress, at Lebanon. As a Freemason, he served the Grand Lodge of Ohio as Grand Orator in 1821 and 1826, Deputy Grand Master in 1823 and 1827 and Grand Master in 1828.

== Political career ==
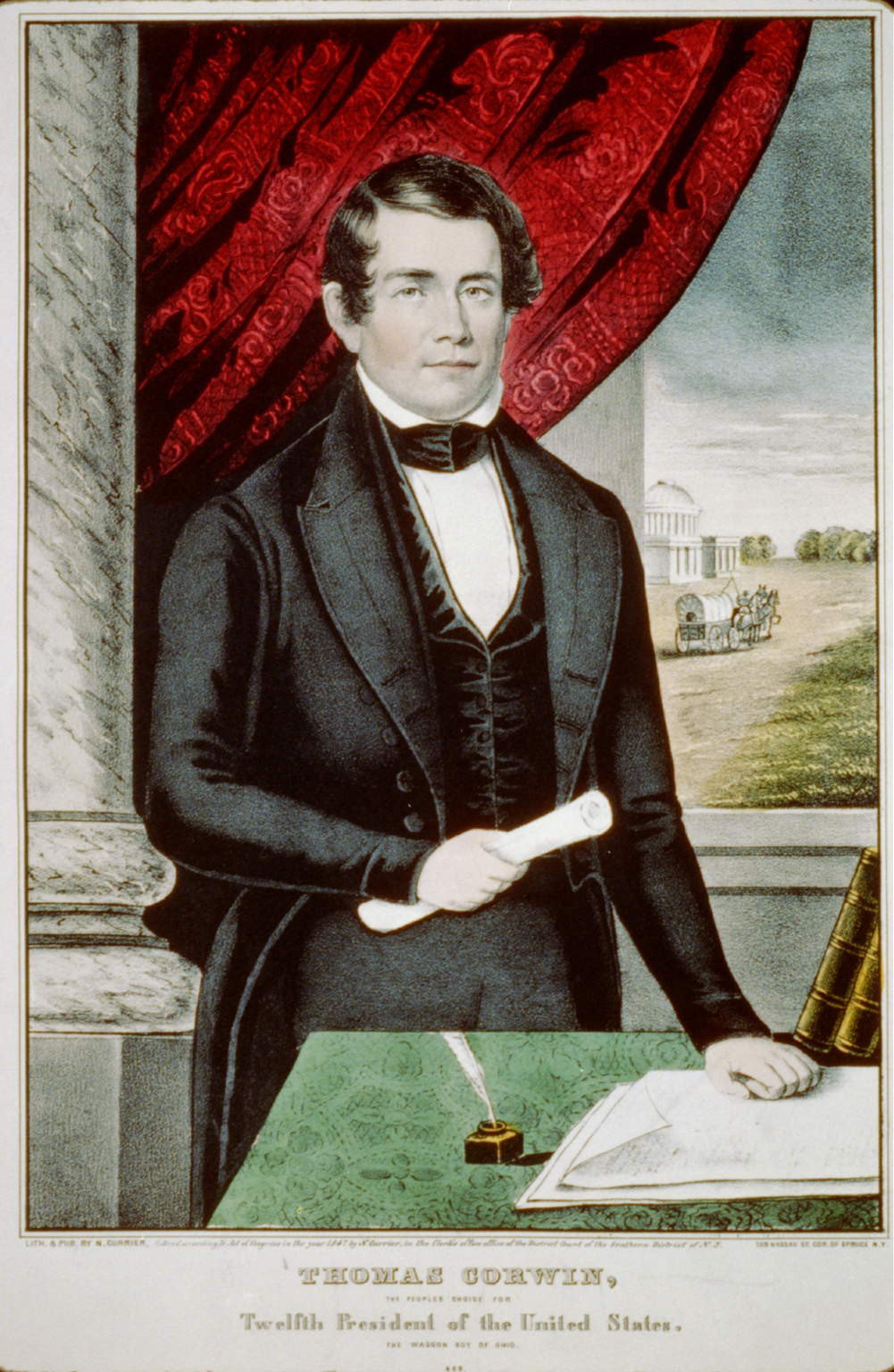
Thomas Corwin in 1847

From 1822 to 1823, and in 1829, Corwin was a member of the Ohio House of Representatives, where he made a spirited speech against the introduction of the whipping post into Ohio. In 1830 he was elected as a Whig to the U.S. House of Representatives and served from March 4, 1831, until his resignation, effective May 30, 1840, having become a candidate for the office of Governor of Ohio. Known for his sharp wit, debating skills, and endless campaigning, he was elected Governor in 1840, defeating incumbent Wilson Shannon. Shannon defeated Corwin in a rematch two years later.

Corwin was a Presidential elector in 1844 for the Whig Party ticket of Henry Clay and Theodore Frelinghuysen.

Corwin was also a member of the United States Senate, having been elected by the Ohio General Assembly as a Whig and served from March 4, 1845, to July 20, 1850. As a legislator he spoke seldom, but always with great ability, his most famous speech being one given on February 11, 1847, opposing the Mexican–American War.

Thomas Corwin, as quoted by Canadian humorist Stephen Leacock:

The world has contempt for the man who amuses it. You must be solemn, solemn as an ass. All the great monuments on earth have been erected over the graves of solemn asses.

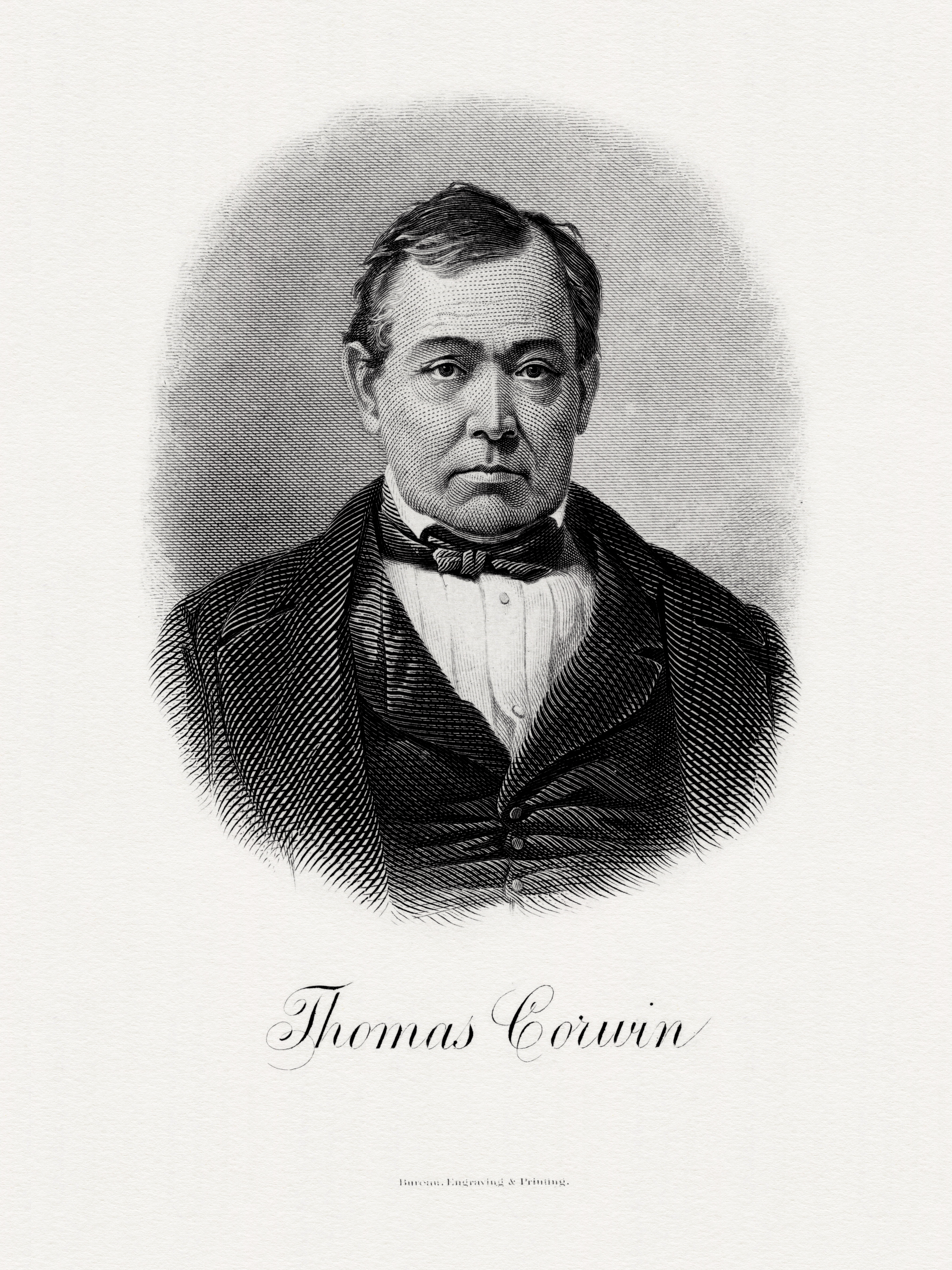
Engraving of Corwin while Secretary of the Treasury created by the Bureau of Engraving and Printing

He resigned from the Senate to become President Millard Fillmore's Secretary of the Treasury shortly after the death of President Zachary Taylor. Like his immediate predecessor, William M. Meredith, Corwin believed in a protective tariff. Still, he did not want to make sudden or drastic changes in the free-trade tariff law of 1846. He objected to that law's provisions, which taxed some imported raw materials at a higher rate than the imported manufactured goods made from those materials, stating in a report to Congress that "such provisions certainly take from the manufacturer and artisan that encouragement which the present law was intended to afford." As a longtime Whig, however, Corwin was unsuccessful in passing any tariff legislation in a Congress controlled by Democrats. He retired as Secretary shortly after the end of Fillmore's administration.

In 1857, former Ohio Governor William Bebb shot a man and was tried in 1858 for manslaughter in Winnebago County, Illinois, where he lived. Corwin and co-counsel Judge William Johnston obtained an acquittal with an argument of self-defense.

He was again elected to the House of Representatives in 1858, this time as a Republican and a member of the 36th Congress. In 1860, he was chairman of the House "Committee of Thirty-three", consisting of one member from each state, and appointed to consider the condition of the nation and, if possible, to devise some scheme for reconciling the North and the South in the secessionist crisis following the election of Abraham Lincoln to the presidency. To that end, he sponsored a proposed Constitutional Amendment, which later became known as the Corwin Amendment, which forbade the Federal Government from outlawing slavery. It read:

No amendment shall be made to the Constitution which will authorize or give to Congress the power to abolish or interfere, within any State, with the domestic institutions thereof, including that of persons held to labor or service by the laws of said State.

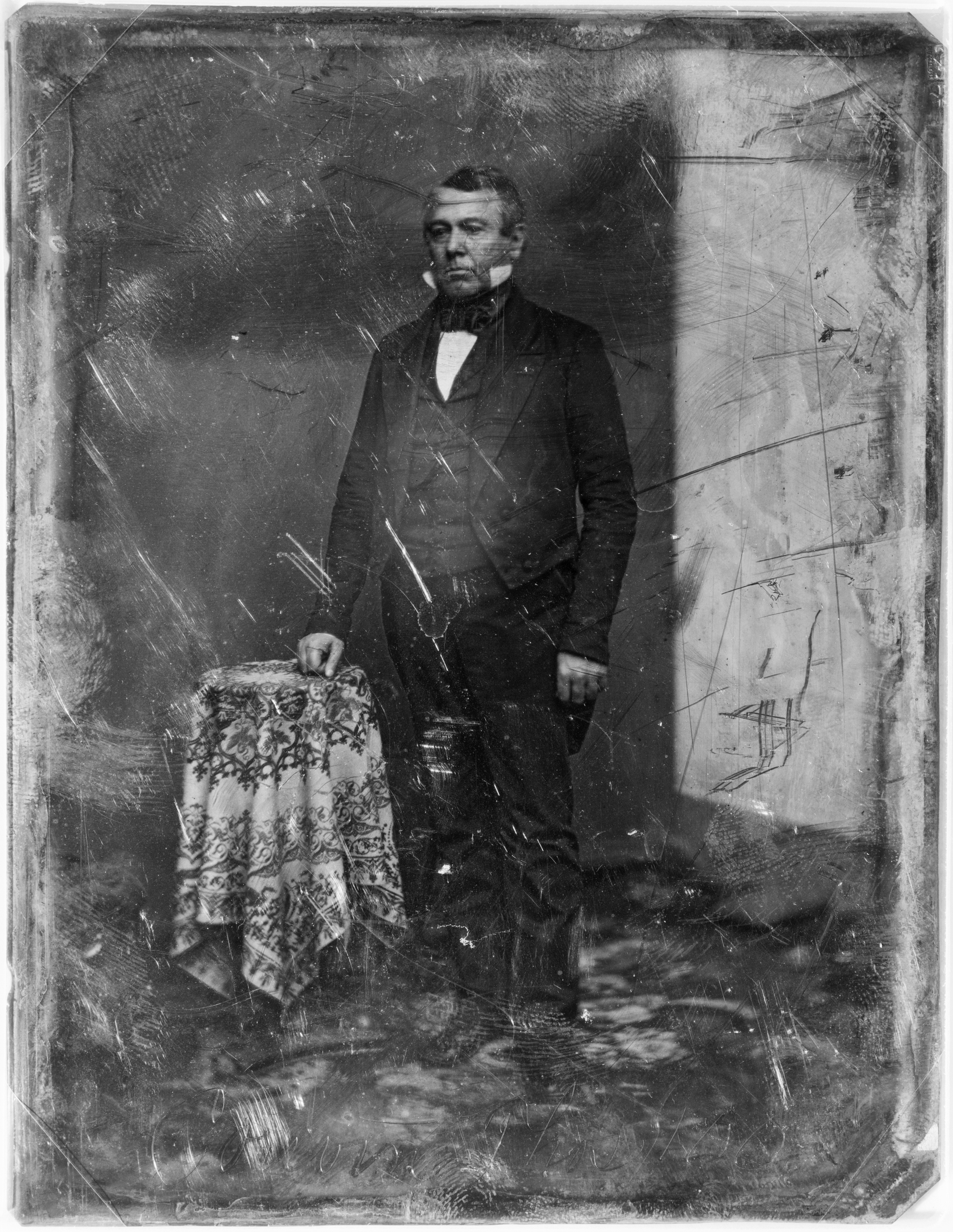
Corwin in the 1850s

Corwin's amendment restated what most Americans already believed, that under the Constitution the Congress had no power to interfere with slavery in the states where it existed.

This doctrine is known as the Federal Consensus, and it was subscribed to by everyone from proslavery radicals like John C. Calhoun and abolitionist radicals like William Lloyd Garrison. Abraham Lincoln, like most Republicans, agreed that in peacetime the federal government could not abolish slavery in a state. The 1860 Republican Party platform restated the familiar doctrine. Prohibited by the Constitution from abolishing slavery in the southern states, antislavery politicians instead aimed at weakening slavery by other means—banning slavery in the territories, denying admission to new slave states, inhibiting the rendition of fugitive slaves in the North, suppressing slavery on the high seas, and abolishing slavery in Washington, D.C. For this reason, southerners had long discounted repeated northern promises not to abolish slavery in a state, and they were unimpressed when Corwin introduced his proposed amendment.

The Corwin amendment passed the Senate on March 2. However, only five states ratified it, and war began anyway. Thus, the initiative failed in its goal of preventing the outbreak of the American Civil War.

Corwin was reelected to the House of Representatives in 1860 but resigned on March 12, 1861, after being appointed by the newly inaugurated President Lincoln to become Minister to Mexico, where he served until 1864. Corwin, well regarded among the Mexican public for his opposition to the Mexican–American War while in the Senate, helped keep relations with the Mexicans friendly throughout the course of the Civil War, despite Confederate efforts to sway their allegiances.

== Death and legacy ==
After resigning from his post as Minister, Corwin settled in Washington, D.C. in 1864, and practiced law until his death on December 18, 1865, at age 71. He is interred in Lebanon Cemetery, Lebanon, Ohio.

Corwin is remembered chiefly as an orator. His speeches both on the stump and in debate were examples of remarkable eloquence.

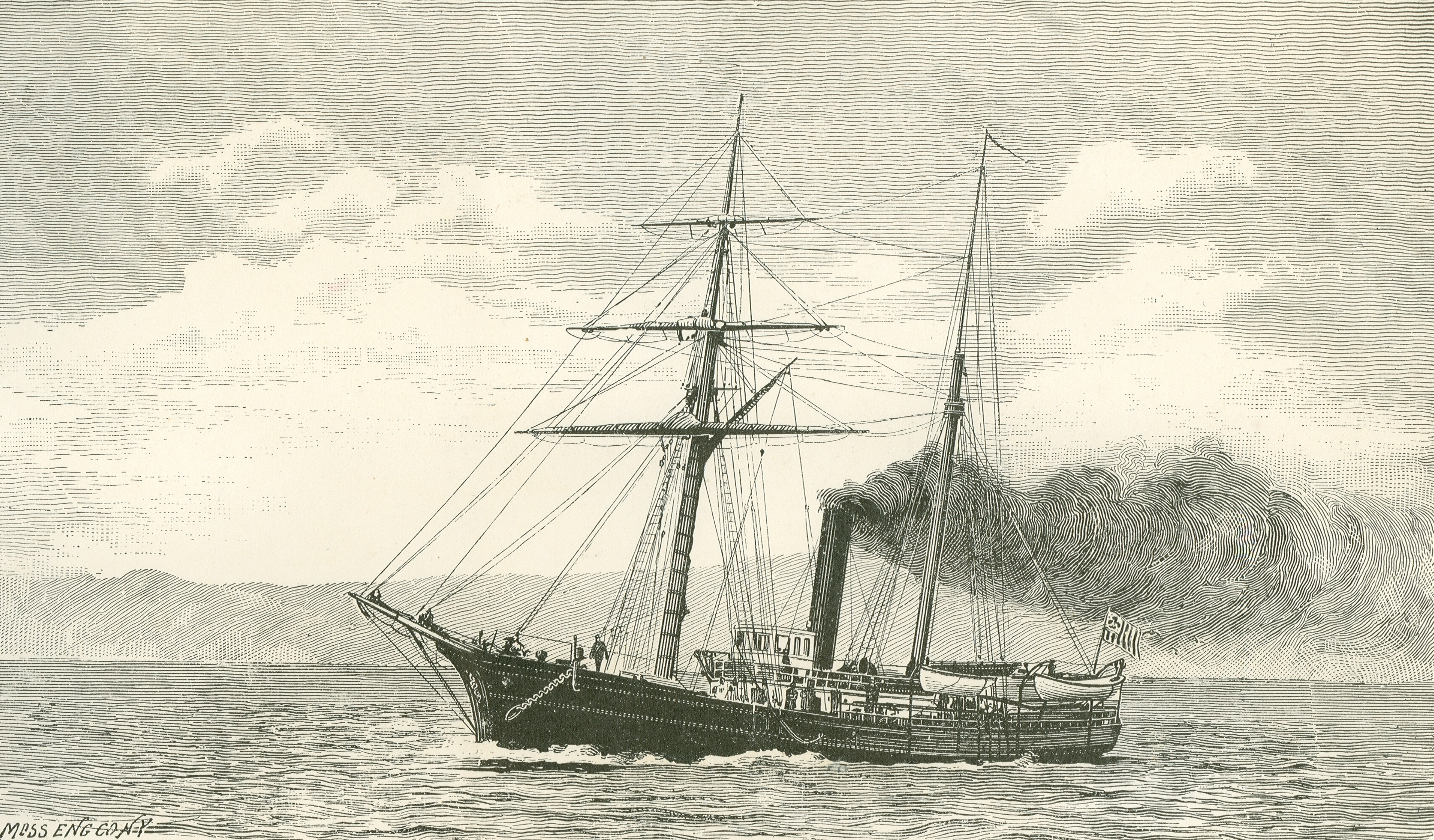
USRC Thomas Corwin revenue cutter was named in his memory

He acquired the nickname Black Tom not because he was African American in ancestry, but because of his dark, swarthy complexion. He did, however, sometimes portray himself, for comedic effect, as having African ancestry. According to Benjamin Perley Poore, Corwin was "a born humorist":

He [Corwin] was a middle-sized, somewhat stout man, with pleasing manners, a fine head, sparkling hazel eyes, and a complexion so dark that on several occasions – as he used to narrate with great glee – he was supposed to be of African descent. "There is no need of my working," said he, "for whenever I cannot support myself in Ohio, all I should have to do would be to cross the river, give myself up to a Kentucky negro-trader, be taken South, and sold for a field hand."

In 1876 the United States Revenue Cutter Service commissioned a cutter named USRC Thomas Corwin. In 1898, the village of Corwin, Ohio was named after him, which is located in Wayne Township, Warren County, Ohio. Corwin was the namesake of the Tom Corwin Coal Company. The associated company town Tom Corwin is an unincorporated community in Jackson County, Ohio.

== Bibliography ==
- Allen, William B. (1872). A History of Kentucky: Embracing Gleanings, Reminiscences, Antiquities, Natural Curiosities, Statistics, and Biographical Sketches of Pioneers, Soldiers, Jurists, Lawyers, Statesmen, Divines, Mechanics, Farmers, Merchants, and Other Leading Men, of All Occupations and Pursuits. Bradley & Gilbert. pp. 271–272.
- Taylor, William Alexander; Taylor, Aubrey Clarence (1899). Ohio statesmen and annals of progress: from the year 1788 to the year 1900 ... Vol. 1. State of Ohio. p. 255.
- Morrow, Josiah (1896). "Life of Thomas Corwin". Life and speeches of Thomas Corwin: orator, lawyer and statesman.

U.S. House of Representatives
Preceded by James Shields	Member of the U.S. House of Representatives from Ohio's 2nd congressional district 1831–1833	Succeeded by Taylor Webster
Preceded by Joseph Vance	Member of the U.S. House of Representatives from Ohio's 4th congressional district 1833–1840	Succeeded by Jeremiah Morrow
Preceded by Zadok Casey	Chair of the House Public Lands Committee; 1839–1840	Succeeded by Samson Mason
Preceded by Aaron Harlan	Member of the U.S. House of Representatives from Ohio's 7th congressional district 1859–1861	Succeeded by Richard A. Harrison
Preceded by George Washington Hopkins	Chair of the House Foreign Affairs Committee; 1859–1861	Succeeded by John J. Crittenden
Party political offices
Preceded by Joseph Vance	Whig nominee for Governor of Ohio; 1840, 1842	Succeeded by Mordecai Bartley
Political offices
Preceded by Wilson Shannon	Governor of Ohio; 1840–1842	Succeeded by Wilson Shannon
Preceded by William M. Meredith	United States Secretary of the Treasury; 1850–1853	Succeeded by James Guthrie
U.S. Senate
Preceded by Benjamin Tappan	U.S. Senator (Class 1) from Ohio; 1845–1850; Served alongside: William Allen, Salmon P. Chase	Succeeded by Thomas Ewing
Diplomatic posts
Preceded by John B. Weller	United States Minister to Mexico; 1861–1864	Succeeded by Robert Shufelt
