= 2nd Ohio General Assembly =

←	1st	3rd	→
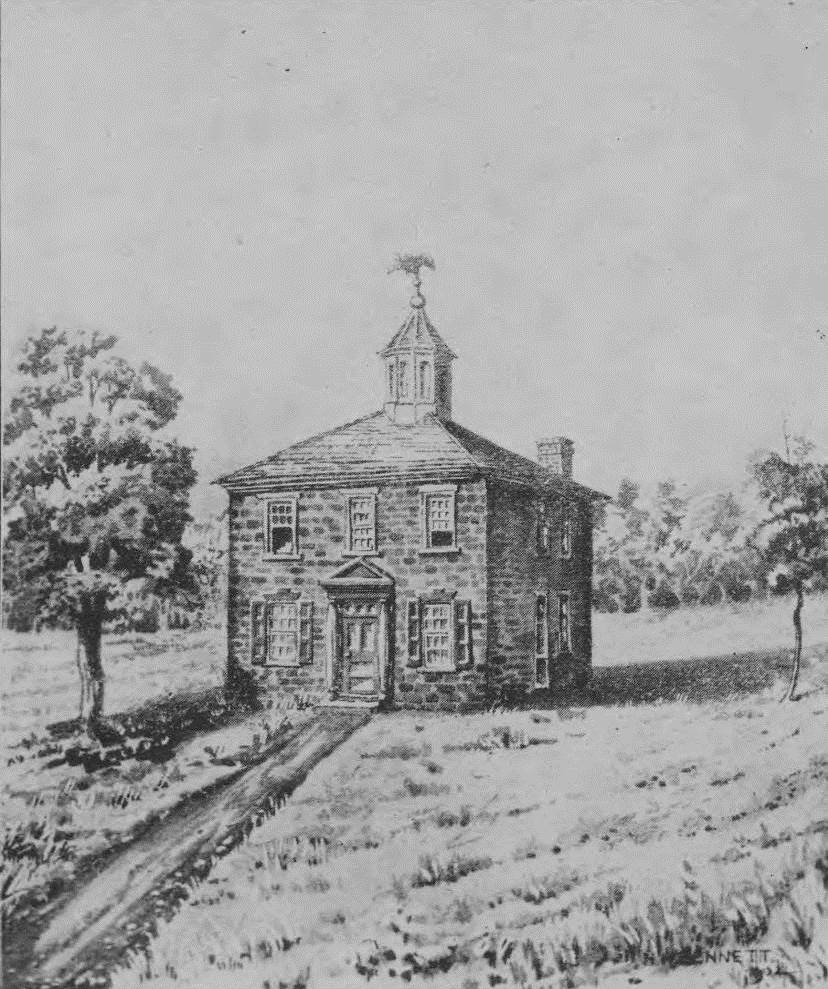
- Ohio's first statehouse at Chillicothe (1800)

Overview
- Term: December 5, 1803 – December 2, 1804

Ohio Senate
- Members: 15
- President of the Senate: Nathaniel Massie (D-R)
- Party control: Democratic-Republican Party

House of Representatives
- Members: 30
- House Speaker: Elias Langham (D-R)
- Party control: Democratic-Republican Party

Sessions
- 1st: December 5, 1803 – February 17, 1804

The Second Ohio General Assembly was the second meeting of the Ohio state legislature, composed of the Ohio State Senate and the Ohio House of Representatives. It convened in Chillicothe, Ohio, on December 5, 1803, and adjourned February 17, 1804. This General Assembly coincided with the second year of Edward Tiffin's first term as Ohio Governor.

== Background ==
Under Ohio's first constitution, State Senators were elected to two year terms. For this class, half were elected for one year and half for two years. Members of the House were elected for each term. Article I, section 2 and 6 of Ohio's first constitution called for an enumeration of white male inhabitants of 21 years age every four years, with the number of representatives and senators for each county apportioned by the legislature based on this census. Article I, section 3 called for elections the second Tuesday in October.

== State Senate ==
=== Districts ===
For this session, the legislature apportioned four senators for Hamilton, Warren, Montgomery, Butler and Greene Counties, two senators for Washington and Gallia Counties, two senators for Ross and Franklin Counties, one senator for Adams and Scioto Counties, two senators for Jefferson and Columbiana Counties, one senator for Clermont County, one senator for Fairfield County, one senator for Trumbull County and one senator for Belmont County.

=== Members ===
District	Senator	Party	notes
Adams; Scioto	Thomas Kirker	Democratic-Republican	
Belmont	William Vance		
Clermont	James Sargent	Democratic-Republican	
Fairfield	Robert F. Slaughter		
Hamilton; Warren; Montgomery; Butler; Greene	John Bigger		
Hamilton; Warren; Montgomery; Butler; Greene	William C. Schenck	Federalist	
Hamilton; Warren; Montgomery; Butler; Greene	Daniel Symmes	Democratic-Republican	
Hamilton; Warren; Montgomery; Butler; Greene	William Ward		
Jefferson; Columbiana	John Milligan	Democratic-Republican	
Jefferson; Columbiana	Bezaleel Wells	Federalist	
Ross; Franklin	Abraham Claypool		
Ross; Franklin	Nathaniel Massie	Democratic-Republican	elected Speaker of the Senate
Trumbull	Benjamin Tappan	Democratic-Republican	
Washington; Gallia	Joseph Buell	Democratic-Republican	
Washington; Gallia	Elijah Backus		

== Ohio House of Representatives ==
=== Districts ===
For this session, the legislature apportioned eight representatives for Hamilton, Warren, Montgomery, Butler and Greene Counties, three representatives for Washington and Gallia Counties, four representatives for Ross and Franklin Counties, three representatives for Adams and Scioto Counties, four representatives for Jefferson and Columbiana Counties, two representatives for Clermont County, two representatives for Fairfield County, two representatives for Trumbull County and two representatives for Belmont County.

=== Members ===
District	Representatives	Party	notes
Adams; Scioto	Daniel Collier		
Adams; Scioto	Abraham Shepherd	Democratic-Republican	
Adams; Scioto	John Wright		
Belmont	Josiah Dillon		
Belmont	James Smith		
Clermont	Jonathan Taylor		
Clermont	Daniel Feagans Sr.		
Fairfield	William Gass		
Fairfield	Philemon Beecher	Democratic-Republican	
Hamilton; Warren; Montgomery; Butler; Greene	Samuel Dick		
Hamilton; Warren; Montgomery; Butler; Greene	William Dodds		
Hamilton; Warren; Montgomery; Butler; Greene	Abner Garard		
Hamilton; Warren; Montgomery; Butler; Greene	Ephraim Kibbey		
Hamilton; Warren; Montgomery; Butler; Greene	William McClure		
Hamilton; Warren; Montgomery; Butler; Greene	Ichabod B. Miller		
Hamilton; Warren; Montgomery; Butler; Greene	John Wallace		
Hamilton; Warren; Montgomery; Butler; Greene	Stephen Wood		
Jefferson; Columbiana	Richard Beeson		
Jefferson; Columbiana	John Sloane	Democratic-Republican	
Jefferson; Columbiana	Samuel Dunlap		
Jefferson; Columbiana	Joseph McKee		
Ross; Franklin	William Creighton Sr.		
Ross; Franklin	James Dunlap	Democratic-Republican	
Ross; Franklin	Elias Langham	Democratic-Republican	elected Speaker of the House
Ross; Franklin	John Evans		
Trumbull	Ephraim Quimby		
Trumbull	David Abbot	Democratic-Republican	
Washington; Gallia	William Jackson		
Washington; Gallia	Charles Mills		
Washington; Gallia	Jesse Fulton		

== Major events ==
The Twelfth Amendment to the United States Constitution was ratified on December 28 and signed on December 30.

On January 7, the State Militia was organized in four divisions, and Major Generals and Quartermaster Generals were named for each division by a joint session.

On February 16, judges were elected for a new county, and to fill vacancies in other counties.

An enumeration in each county of “free white male citizens of the age of 21 years” was made as follows:

County	Free white male citizens of the age of 21 years
Adams	906
Belmont	1030
Butler	836
Clermont	755
Columbiana	542
Fairfield	1050
Franklin	240
Gallia	307
Greene	446
Hamilton	1700
Jefferson County, Ohio	1533
Montgomery	526
Ross	1982
Scioto County, Ohio	249
Trumbull	1111
Warren	844
Washington	1246
total for Ohio	14762

== Major legislation ==
On January 7, a new county was formed from portions of Washington and Fairfield counties. It was originally to be called Livingston, but was amended to be Muskingum before final passage, with county seat of Zanesville.

Acts were passed to allow alien ownership of land, regulating admission of attorneys to practice, and for opening and improving roads.

A crime and punishment act was passed. Treason, rape, murder, malicious maiming and 1st degree arson were punishable by death. Manslaughter, 2nd degree arson, maiming without malice, by a fine of not more than $1000 and two years in prison. Perjury and subornation of perjury, the same punishment with disenfranchisement; forgery, 30 lashes and fine equal to sum fraudulently obtained and disenfranchisement; counterfeiting, 39 lashes, fine not exceeding $1000 and disenfranchisement; burglary not more than $500 fine and imprisonment of not more than one year; robbery, 59 lashes for 1st offence and 100 lashes for 2nd offence; larceny, 15 lashes for 1st offence and 30 lashes for 2nd.

== See also ==
- List of Ohio state legislatures
