= William Cortenus Schenck =

American politician (1773–1821)

Member of the Ohio Senate from the Hamilton and other counties district
- In office December 5, 1803 – December 2, 1804 Serving with John Bigger; Daniel Symmes; William Ward
- Preceded by: Francis Dunlavy; Jeremiah Morrow; John Paul; Daniel Symmes
- Succeeded by: Daniel Symmes; Cornelius Snider

Personal details
- Born: January 11, 1773 Freehold, New Jersey
- Died: January 12, 1821 (aged 48) Columbus, Ohio
- Resting place: Woodhill cemetery, Franklin, Ohio
- Party: Federalist
- Spouse: Elizabeth Rogers
- Children: Robert C. Schenck; James F. Schenck

Military service
- Allegiance: United States
- Branch/service: United States Army
- Rank: General
- Battles/wars: War of 1812

William Cortenus Schenck (1773–1821) was a pioneer surveyor, militia general and legislator. Two of his sons were prominent military men.

== Youth ==
William C. Schenck was born at Freehold, New Jersey, on January 11, 1773. His father was a Presbyterian minister, and his mother was a sister of General John N. Cumming, with whom he lived for a time at Newark. Family tradition says he graduated from Princeton University in 1793 or 1794, though that is unconfirmed. He studied both medicine and law, but decided to become a surveyor.

== Move west ==
In 1793, Schenck moved west to Cincinnati in the Northwest Territory. He was an agent of his uncle and other New Jersey men, Jacob Burnet, Jonathan Dayton, and John Cleves Symmes. He surveyed and laid out Franklin, Ohio, with Daniel C. Cooper in 1796, where he later made his home. He spent 1797 surveying the United States Military District in eastern Ohio. He married Elizabeth Rogers on September 14, 1798, at Huntington, Long Island. They made their home at Cincinnati.

Schenck was appointed the secretary of Northwest Territory Legislative Council from 1799 to 1802. In 1802, a constitutional convention was held to write a constitution for the new state of Ohio. Ten delegates were elected from Hamilton County. Schenck finished in 14th place. He also laid out the town of Newark, Ohio, in 1802. He was proprietor with his uncle and Judge Burnet. They chose the forks of the Licking River as the town site.

Schenck and family moved to Franklin in 1802 or 1803. They eventually had nine sons and a daughter, including Robert C. Schenck and James F. Schenck. He was the clerk of the Ohio Senate during the 1st General Assembly, (1803). That General Assembly gave a charter to the Miami Exporting Company, the first bank in the state. Schenck was named a member of the first directorate of that bank on June 16, 1803. He was elected to represent several counties in the Ohio Senate for the 2nd General Assembly, (1803-1804). He laid out Port Lawrence, now Toledo, Ohio in 1816. He represented Warren County in the Ohio House of Representatives during the 19th General Assembly, (1820-1821).

== Military activities ==
Soon after arriving in the west, Schenck became involved in military affairs. On February 6, 1793, he was commissioned Lieutenant of the Hamilton County Militia of the United States Northwest of the Ohio. When Ohio became a state, he was given a commission as captain of the third regiment of Hamilton County, dated November 17, 1807.

During the War of 1812, Schenck had rank of General of militia, though it is not known which battles he took part in.

== Death ==
Schenck was a proponent of canals in Ohio. In 1820, an act was passed to provide for three commissioners to be appointed to survey a route for a canal between the Ohio River and Lake Erie. Governor Ethan Allen Brown appointed Schenck as one of these three commissioners. The next year, he was a member of the Ohio House, and he made a speech before the legislature on January 12, 1821, advocating immediate construction of such a canal. He left the House, went to his lodgings and died some hours later from what was known as "swamp fever", which he had contracted during his surveying expeditions. The legislature suspended business, and the entire membership of both houses escorted his remains to the edge of Franklinton, a Columbus suburb.

== Notes ==
Ohio Senate
Preceded by new position	Clerk of the Senate; 1803	Succeeded by Thomas Scott
Preceded by Daniel Symmes; Jeremiah Morrow; John Paul; Francis Dunlavy	Senator from Hamilton County; 1803-1804; Served alongside: Daniel Symmes; John Bigger; William Ward	Succeeded by Daniel Symmes; Cornelius Snider
Ohio House of Representatives
Preceded by George Kessling; John Bigger	Representative from Warren County; 1820-1821; Served alongside: John Bigger	Succeeded by Thomas Corwin; John Bigger
