= Francis Dunlavy =

American politician

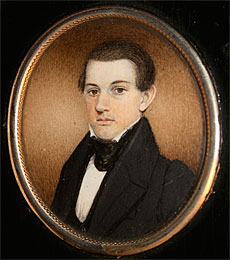

Member of the Ohio Senate from the Hamilton County district
- In office March 1, 1803 – December 4, 1803 Serving with Daniel Symmes; Jeremiah Morrow; John Paul
- Preceded by: new office
- Succeeded by: Daniel Symmes; John Bigger; William Ward; William C. Schenck

Personal details
- Born: 1761 Virginia
- Died: November 6, 1839 (aged 77–78) Lebanon, Ohio
- Party: Anti-Federalist

Francis Dunlavy (1761–1839) was a teacher, judge and Ohio Senator.

== Biography ==
Born in Virginia, he moved to Columbia, near Cincinnati, in 1792. In 1800, he was elected to the Northwest Territorial Legislature as an Anti-Federalist. Two years later, he was chosen as a delegate to the Ohio Constitutional Convention, representing Hamilton county. Dunlavy took an active role in writing the Ohio Constitution but was unable to include any sort of provision guaranteeing suffrage to African-Americans. In 1803, he was elected to the first Ohio State Senate but was soon appointed a president judge for the Court of Common Pleas for Southwest Ohio even though had never been called to the bar. This position he occupied for the next 14 years, after which he commenced private law practice for about 10 years.

He died November 6, 1839, and is interred in Lebanon, Ohio. His tombstone reads-

He was one of the first white men who entered the Territory now forming Ohio; was a member of the Territorial Legislature, and of the convention which formed the Constitution of Ohio

== Sources ==
Historical Lebanon Ohio

Pic of tombstone
