= Gustavus Swan =

American judge

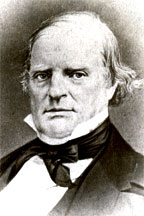

Associate Justice of the Ohio Supreme Court
- In office July 9, 1829 – February 1830
- Preceded by: Charles Robert Sherman
- Succeeded by: John Milton Goodenow

Member of the Ohio House of Representatives from the Franklin County district
- In office December 7, 1812 – December 5, 1813
- Preceded by: John Barr
- Succeeded by: Thomas Johnson
- In office December 1, 1817 – December 6, 1818
- Preceded by: Thomas Moores
- Succeeded by: John A. McDowell

Personal details
- Born: July 15, 1787 Sharon, New Hampshire
- Died: February 6, 1860 (aged 72) Columbus, Ohio
- Spouse: Amelia Aldrich

Gustavus Swan (also known as Gustave) (July 15, 1787 – February 6, 1860) was a lawyer and banker from the U.S. state of Ohio who was appointed to fill a vacancy on the Ohio Supreme Court in 1829-1830.

== Biography ==
Swan was born in Sharon, New Hampshire in 1787 to John and Sarah Swan. He attended local schools and private academies in the area, trading bookkeeping for tuition and board. He worked as an assistant in a bank while studying law at night. In 1810, he moved to Ohio.

Swan lived in Marietta for a year and worked in a law office before being admitted to the bar in 1811. He moved to Franklinton, in hopes it would become the state capital. In 1814, he moved to Columbus. He also served in the Fourth Brigade of the Second Division of the Ohio Militia during the War of 1812.

Swan was elected to the Ohio House of Representatives in 1812 and 1817 for one year terms. In between, he had a law practice, doing title work on claims in the Virginia Military District. He also was Franklin County prosecuting attorney 1821-1823.

On October 1, 1823, Ohio Governor Jeremiah Morrow appointed Swan as president judge of the Court of Common Pleas for the sixth circuit, to fill a vacancy caused by the death of the sitting judge. He was appointed to a full seven-year term in February 1824 by the legislature.

Swan resigned from the sixth circuit on July 9, 1829, when Governor Allen Trimble appointed him to fill the vacancy on the Ohio Supreme Court caused by the death of Charles Robert Sherman. He served until February 1830, when the legislature appointed a permanent replacement. He then continued in private practice in Columbus until 1844, when he retired from law.

May 21, 1840, Governor Wilson Shannon appointed Swan a Canal Fund Commissioner. He was re-appointed in 1842.

From 1823 to 1842, Swan served as president of the Franklin Bank of Columbus. In 1845, the General Assembly appointed him to the Board of Control of the Bank of Ohio. He was appointed the first president of the State Bank of Ohio and held that position until 1854.

Swan married Amelia Aldrich in Hillsboro, New Hampshire in 1819. They had four children. Swan died in Columbus February 6, 1860.
