= Justice Swan =

Justice Swan may refer to:

- Gustavus Swan (1787–1860), associate justice of the Ohio Supreme Court
- Joseph Rockwell Swan (politician) (1802–1884), associate justice of the Ohio Supreme Court
