= Senator Pritchard (disambiguation) =

Jeter Connelly Pritchard (1857–1921) was a U.S. Senator from North Carolina from 1895 to 1903. Senator Pritchard may also refer to:

- James Pritchard (politician) (1763–1813), Ohio State Senate
- Joel Pritchard (1925–1997), Washington State Senate
