= John Paul (pioneer) =

American politician

Member of the Ohio Senate from the Hamilton County district
- In office March 1, 1803 – December 4, 1803 Serving with Francis Dunlavy; Daniel Symmes; Jeremiah Morrow
- Preceded by: new state
- Succeeded by: Daniel Symmes; John Bigger; William Ward; William C. Schenck

Personal details
- Born: November 12, 1758 Germantown, Philadelphia, Pennsylvania
- Died: June 6, 1830 (aged 71) Madison, Indiana, U.S.
- Resting place: Fairmount Cemetery
- Party: Democratic-Republican
- Spouse: Sarah Thornberry Grover
- Children: Four

Military service
- Allegiance: United States
- Branch/service: United States Army
- Rank: Colonel
- Battles/wars: American Revolutionary War; War of 1812

John Paul was a pioneer in Ohio and Indiana, founding Xenia, Ohio and Madison, Indiana. He was a delegate at the convention that drafted the constitution of Ohio, and was a state senator in the first general assembly after statehood. He also served in the first state senate of Indiana. He founded the second newspaper in Indiana. He was known as "Colonel John Paul" for his services in the American Revolutionary War and the War of 1812.

== Youth ==
John Paul was the fourth of seven children of Michael Paul, a native of Holland, and Ann Parker, a native of Germantown, Philadelphia, Pennsylvania They were married at Germantown in about 1751 or 1752, and John Paul was born in Germantown on November 12, 1758. In 1766 or 1767, the family moved to Redstone, Old Fort, now Brownsville, Fayette County, Pennsylvania.

== Revolutionary War ==
In 1778, Paul joined George Rogers Clark in the Illinois campaign, a series of battles during the American Revolutionary War, culminating with the capture of the town of Kaskaskia and British fort at Vincennes in 1779.

== Life in Kentucky ==
In 1781, Paul's family moved to Kentucky, and settled at what would later be Hardin County. Kentucky achieved statehood in 1792, and Hardin County was established the next year. Paul was the first clerk and recorder of the county. In 1794, he married Sarah Thornberry Grover. They had four children, with the eldest, Mary Berry, dying young.

== Life in Ohio ==
In 1800, Paul moved to the Northwest Territory, in what was then Hamilton County, but would later be Greene County, Ohio. He was nominated in 1802 by the Democratic-Republican Party convention as a delegate to the convention that would write a constitution for the proposed state of Ohio. He received the second highest number of votes. He voted to allow civil right for Black people in the new state.

Paul was elected one of four Hamilton County members of the Ohio State Senate for the first general assembly in 1803. Greene County was created during this assembly. Paul was appointed first county recorder and clerk of courts for the county, and was clerk for the county commissioners. The county seat was located on land owned by Paul, where the first building of the village of Xenia, Ohio was erected in 1804.

== Life in Indiana ==
Paul moved to Indiana Territory in 1809, and established the village of Madison. He established the first ferry from Madison to Kentucky across the Ohio River in 1811. He also established a grist mill and saw mill before enlisting as a volunteer in the War of 1812 in 1812. He commanded a regiment under General William Henry Harrison in Northwest Ohio during the siege of Fort Meigs and the attack on Fort Stephenson. He was thereafter referred to as "Colonel John Paul".

In 1813, Paul established the second newspaper in Indiana, the "Western Eagle", and in 1814 he was named president of the first bank in the village. In 1816, Indiana became a state, and Paul was elected to the first Indiana Senate, where he was the presiding officer.

Paul made a trip on horseback to view some horses he was considering buying. His horse swam a flood swollen creek, but Paul fell and struck his head on a stone. He was found unconscious and soaking wet some hours later, and suffered from rheumatism for three years before his death in Madison on June 6, 1830. He was buried at city cemetery. In 1904, the city removed all burials to Fairmont Cemetery, and the original cemetery became "John Paul Park" in Madison.

== Legacy ==
In 1816, Paul's daughter, Ann Parker Paul was married to William Hendricks. He was a senator and governor of Indiana.
