= List of Ohio state legislatures =

The Ohio General Assembly, the legislature of the U.S. state of Ohio, has convened many times since statehood became effective on March 1, 1803.

== Legislatures ==
Name	Start date	End date	Last election
1802 Ohio Constitution
1st Ohio General Assembly	March 1, 1803	December 4, 1803	January 1803
2nd Ohio General Assembly	December 5, 1803	December 2, 1804	
3rd Ohio General Assembly	December 3, 1804	December 1, 1805	
4th Ohio General Assembly	December 2, 1805	November 30, 1806	
5th Ohio General Assembly	December 1, 1806	December 6, 1807	
6th Ohio General Assembly	1807		
7th Ohio General Assembly	1808		
8th Ohio General Assembly	1809		
9th Ohio General Assembly	1810		
10th Ohio General Assembly	1811		
11th Ohio General Assembly	1812		
12th Ohio General Assembly	1813		
13th Ohio General Assembly	1814		
14th Ohio General Assembly	1815		
15th Ohio General Assembly	1816		
16th Ohio General Assembly	1817		
17th Ohio General Assembly	1818		
18th Ohio General Assembly	1819		
19th Ohio General Assembly	1820		
20th Ohio General Assembly	1821		
21st Ohio General Assembly	1822		
22nd Ohio General Assembly	1823		
23rd Ohio General Assembly	1824		
24th Ohio General Assembly	1825		
25th Ohio General Assembly	1826		
26th Ohio General Assembly	1827		
27th Ohio General Assembly	1828		
28th Ohio General Assembly	1829		
29th Ohio General Assembly	1830		
30th Ohio General Assembly	1831		
31st Ohio General Assembly	1832		
32nd Ohio General Assembly	1833		
33rd Ohio General Assembly	1834		
34th Ohio General Assembly	1835		
35th Ohio General Assembly	1836		
36th Ohio General Assembly	1837		
37th Ohio General Assembly	1838		
38th Ohio General Assembly	1839		
39th Ohio General Assembly	1840		
40th Ohio General Assembly	1841		
41st Ohio General Assembly	1842		
42nd Ohio General Assembly	1843		
43rd Ohio General Assembly	1844		
44th Ohio General Assembly	1845		
45th Ohio General Assembly	1846		
46th Ohio General Assembly	1847		
47th Ohio General Assembly	1848		
48th Ohio General Assembly	1849		
49th Ohio General Assembly	1850		
1851 Ohio Constitution
50th Ohio General Assembly	1852	1853	
51st Ohio General Assembly	1854		
52nd Ohio General Assembly	1856		
53rd Ohio General Assembly	1858		
54th Ohio General Assembly	1860		
55th Ohio General Assembly	1862		
56th Ohio General Assembly	1864		
57th Ohio General Assembly	1866		
58th Ohio General Assembly	1868		
59th Ohio General Assembly	1870		
60th Ohio General Assembly	1872		
61st Ohio General Assembly	1874		
62nd Ohio General Assembly	1876		
63rd Ohio General Assembly	1878		
64th Ohio General Assembly	1880		
65th Ohio General Assembly	1882		
66th Ohio General Assembly	1884		
67th Ohio General Assembly	1886		
68th Ohio General Assembly	1888		
69th Ohio General Assembly	January 1890		
70th Ohio General Assembly	1892		
71st Ohio General Assembly	1894		
72nd Ohio General Assembly	1896		
73rd Ohio General Assembly	1898		
74th Ohio General Assembly	1900		
75th Ohio General Assembly	January 1902		November 1901
76th Ohio General Assembly	1904		
77th Ohio General Assembly	1906		
78th Ohio General Assembly	1909		
79th Ohio General Assembly	1911		
Ohio Constitution of 1912 (amendments to 1851 Constitution)
80th Ohio General Assembly	1913		
81st Ohio General Assembly	1915		
82nd Ohio General Assembly	1917		
83rd Ohio General Assembly	1919		
84th Ohio General Assembly	1921		
85th Ohio General Assembly	1923		
86th Ohio General Assembly	1925		
87th Ohio General Assembly	1927		
88th Ohio General Assembly	1929		
89th Ohio General Assembly	1931		
90th Ohio General Assembly	1933		
91st Ohio General Assembly	1935		
92nd Ohio General Assembly	1937		
93rd Ohio General Assembly	1939		
94th Ohio General Assembly	1941		
95th Ohio General Assembly	1942		
96th Ohio General Assembly	1944		
97th Ohio General Assembly	1947		
98th Ohio General Assembly	1949		
99th Ohio General Assembly	1951		
100th Ohio General Assembly	1953		
101st Ohio General Assembly	1955		
102nd Ohio General Assembly	1957		
103rd Ohio General Assembly	1959		
104th Ohio General Assembly	1961		
105th Ohio General Assembly	1963		
106th Ohio General Assembly	1965		
107th Ohio General Assembly	1967		
108th Ohio General Assembly	1969		
109th Ohio General Assembly	1971		
110th Ohio General Assembly	1973		
111th Ohio General Assembly	1975		
112th Ohio General Assembly	1977		
113th Ohio General Assembly	1979		
114th Ohio General Assembly	1981		
115th Ohio General Assembly	1983		
116th Ohio General Assembly	1985		
117th Ohio General Assembly	1987		
118th Ohio General Assembly	1989		
119th Ohio General Assembly	1991		
120th Ohio General Assembly	1993		
121st Ohio General Assembly	1995		
122nd Ohio General Assembly	1997		
123rd Ohio General Assembly	1999		
124th Ohio General Assembly	2001		
125th Ohio General Assembly	2003		
126th Ohio General Assembly	2005		
127th Ohio General Assembly	2007		
128th Ohio General Assembly	January 5, 2009	December 31, 2010	
129th Ohio General Assembly	January 3, 2011	December 20, 2012	November 2010
130th Ohio General Assembly	January 7, 2013	December 30, 2014	November 2012
131st Ohio General Assembly	January 5, 2015	January 2, 2017	November 2014
132nd Ohio General Assembly	January 3, 2017	December 31, 2018	November 2016: House
133rd Ohio General Assembly	January 7, 2019	December 31, 2020	November 2018: House, Senate
134th Ohio General Assembly	January 4, 2021	December 31, 2022	November 2020: House, Senate
135th Ohio General Assembly	January 3, 2023	December 31, 2024	November 2022: House, Senate
136th Ohio General Assembly	2025		November 5, 2024: House, Senate

== See also ==
- List of speakers of the Ohio House of Representatives
- List of presidents of the Ohio Senate
- Representative history of the Ohio Senate
- Representative history of the Ohio House of Representatives
- List of governors of Ohio
- Ohio Statehouse
- Historical outline of Ohio
- Lists of United States state legislative sessions
