= 41st Ohio General Assembly =

←	40th Ohio General Assembly	42nd Ohio General Assembly	→
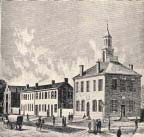

Overview
- Legislative body: Ohio General Assembly
- Jurisdiction: Ohio, United States
- Meeting place: Columbus, Ohio
- Term: December 5, 1842 – December 3, 1843
- Election: October 1842
- Opposition: Whig

Ohio Senate
- Members: 36 Senators
- Speaker: James J. Faran (D-Cincinnati)
- Party control: Democratic

Ohio House of Representatives
- Members: 72 Representatives
- Speaker: John Chaney (D-Fairfield)
- Party control: Democratic

The 41st Ohio General Assembly first convened on December 5, 1842. The 36 members of the Ohio Senate and the 72 members of the Ohio House of Representatives were elected during the General Election of October 1842.

== Leadership ==
=== Senate ===
Speaker of the Senate
James J. Faran (D-Cincinnati)

=== House of Representatives ===
Speaker of the House
John Chaney (D-Fairfield)

== Members ==
=== Senate ===
Name	County	Party
Charles M. Aten	Columbiana	Democratic
Joseph Barnet	Montgomery	Whig
Thomas W. Bartley	Richland	Democratic
Jacob Clark	Lucas, Williams, Henry, Paulding, Putnam, Van Wert, Allen, and Hardin	Democratic
William H. P. Denny	Warren and Greene	Whig
James J. Faran (Speaker)	Hamilton	Democratic
Nelson Franklin	Fairfield and Pickaway	Democratic
John Fuller	Huron and Erie	Whig
Seabury Ford	Cuyahoga and Geauga	Whig
Josiah Harris	Medina and Lorain	Democratic
Robert Hazeltine	Butler and Preble	Democratic
James Henderson	Muskingum	Whig
John E. Jackson	Portage and Summit	Whig
John Johnson	Knox and Coshocton	Democratic
Oliver Jones	Hamilton	Democratic
Jacob B. Koch	Holmes and Tuscarawas	Democratic
Samuel Lahm	Stark	Democratic
Allen Latham	Hocking, Ross, Pike, and Jackson	Democratic
James Loudon	Clermont, Brown, and Clinton	Democratic
Moses McAnelly	Seneca, Sandusky, Wood, Ottawa, and Hancock	Democratic
Alexander McConnell	Morgan, Perry, and Washington	Democratic
Joseph McCutchen	Crawford, Delaware, and Marion	Democratic
Robert H. Miller	Belmont and Harrison	Democratic
James Mitchell	Jefferson and Carroll	Democratic
Simeon Nash	Gallia, Lawrence, and Scioto	Whig
Eben Newton	Trumbull	Whig
James Parker	Licking	Democratic
John Richey	Morgan, Perry, and Washington	Democratic
Joseph Ridgway, Jr.	Franklin, Madison, and Clark	Whig
William Robbins	Adams, Highland, and Fayette	Democratic
Benjamin Stanton	Champaign, Logan, and Union	Whig
Abraham Van Vorhes	Athens and Meigs	Whig
Joseph S. Updegraff	Miami, Darke, Mercer, and Shelby	Whig
Benjamin F. Wade	Ashtabula and Lake	Whig
William C. Walton	Guernsey and Monroe	Democratic
Charles Wolcott	Wayne	Democratic

=== House of Representatives ===
Name	County	Party
J. B. Ackley	Athens and Meigs	Whig
Samuel Atherton	Huron and Erie	Whig
Isaac Atkinson, Sr.	Jefferson and Carroll	Whig
George W. Baird	Seneca, Sandusky, Hancock, Wood, and Ottawa	Democratic
Jacob H. Baldwin	Trumbull	Whig
Henry C. Brish	Seneca, Sandusky, Hancock, Wood, and Ottawa	Democratic
Israel Brown	Hamilton	Democratic
Charles Bowen	Muskingum	Whig
Le Grand Byington	Hocking, Ross, Pike, and Jackson	Democratic
Richard W. Cahill	Richland	Democratic
Hiram Campbell	Gallia, Lawrence, and Scioto	Whig
David Chambers	Muskingum	Whig
John Chaney (Speaker)	Fairfield	Democratic
Joseph Chenoweth	Franklin	Whig
John C. Clark	Morgan	Democratic
John P. Converse	Geauga	Whig
Jacob Counts	Miami, Darke, Mercer, and Shelby	Whig
Otway Curry	Logan and Union	Fed.
Nathaniel Dike	Jefferson and Carroll	Whig
William Douglass	Guernsey	Democratic
Thomas Earl	Portage	Whig
David Fisher	Clermont, Brown, and Clinton	Whig
John Fudge	Greene	Whig
Simeon Fuller	Lake	Whig
John M. Gallagher	Madison and Clark	Whig
Archibald Gordon	Hamilton	Democratic
Isaac Green	Licking	Democratic
John Gruber	Harrison	Democratic
James P. Henderson	Richland	Democratic (Note: Although a March 31, 1843, issue of the Carroll Free Press lists James P. Henderson as a Whig, he's referred to as a Democrat in issues of The Ohio Democrat and The Democratic Standard printed directly after the election. It is therefore plausible that Henderson switched parties in the months following the election.)
Isaac Houseman	Madison and Clark	Whig
Phelps Humphrey	Licking	Democratic
Isaac E. James	Delaware, Marion, and Crawford	Democratic
Elihu Johnson	Hocking, Ross, Pike, and Jackson	Democratic
Daniel Kelley	Perry	Democratic
Thomas M. Kelley	Cuyahoga	Whig
James Kilgore	Stark	Democratic
James B. King	Butler	Democratic
Newton Larsh	Preble	Whig
John Larwill	Wayne	Democratic
John Martin	Columbiana	Democratic
Rudolphus Martin	Stark	Democratic
William McClung	Fairfield	Democratic
John McClure	Miami, Darke, Mercer, and Shelby	Whig
David McConnell	Tuscarawas and Holmes	Democratic
William B. McCrea	Champaign	Whig
Joel B. McFarland	Butler	Democratic
Caleb J. McNulty	Knox	Democratic
Jesse Meredith	Coshocton	Democratic
Gilman C. Mudgett	Lucas, Williams, Henry, Paulding, Putnam, Van Wert, Allen, and Hardin	Democratic
Wilson Nelson	Hocking, Ross, Pike, and Jackson	Democratic
Cornelius Okey	Monroe	Democratic
Edson B. Olds	Pickaway	Democratic
Samuel H. Pardee	Portage	Whig
Thomas Pilcher	Belmont	Democratic
John Probasco, Jr.	Warren	Whig
John Reid	Columbiana	Democratic
Moses Rees	Clermont, Brown, and Clinton	Democratic
Robert Robinson	Adams, Highland, and Fayette	Whig
Thomas Ross	Clermont, Brown, and Clinton	Whig
Robert C. Schenck	Montgomery	Whig
Amos Seward	Summit	Whig
George W. Sharp	Delaware, Marion, and Crawford	Democratic
John A. Smith	Adams, Highland, and Fayette	Whig
Nicholas Spindlar	Knox	Democratic
James B. Steedman	Lucas, Williams, Henry, Paulding, Putnam, Van Wert, Allen, and Hardin	Democratic
Jonathan Tuttle	Ashtabula	Whig
William Wakefield	Hamilton	Democratic
Richard Warner	Lorain and Medina	Democratic
Nathan Webb	Trumbull	Whig
John D. White	Clermont, Brown, and Clinton	Democratic
Joseph Wilford	Wayne	Democratic
George W. Woodbridge	Washington	Independent Whig

== Standing committees ==
=== Senate ===
Committee	Democratic members	Whig members
Judiciary	Thomas W. Bartley, William C. Walton	Eben Newton
Finance	William C. Walton, Jacob Clark	Seabury Ford
Canals	Alexander McConnell, Jacob B. Koch	Joseph Barnet
Roads and Highways	Moses McAnelly	Nelson Franklin, John E. Jackson
Schools and School Lands	Josiah Harris, Charles Wolcott	Simeon Nash
New Counties	John Richey, James Loudon	John Fuller
Military Affairs	Charles Wolcott, Robert H. Miller	Benjamin F. Wade
Medical Colleges and Universities	Jacob Clark, John Johnson	James Henderson
Colleges and Universities	James Loudon, Thomas W. Bartley	Joseph S. Updegraph
Agriculture, Manufacture, and Commerce	Robert H. Miller, William Robbins	William H. P. Denny
Penitentiary	Samuel Lahm, James Mitchell	Joseph Ridgway
Library	Josiah Harris, John Johnson	John E. Jackson
Currency	Allen Latham, Joseph McCutchen	Eben Newton
Public Lands	James Parker, Alexander McConnell	Benjamin Stanton
Rail Roads and Turnpikes	Olliver Jones, Robert Hazeltine	Abraham Van Vorhes
Public Institutions	Nelson Franklin, Samuel Lahm, James Parker	N/A
Corporations	Charles M. Aten, Moses McAnelly	James Henderson
Public Buildings	Joseph McCutchen, Joseph Ridgway, Jacob B. Koch	N/A
Public Debt	Robert Hazeltine, James Mitchell	William H. P. Denny

=== House ===
Committee	Democratic members	Whig members
Privileges and Elections	Joel B. McFarland, James P. Henderson, John C. Clark	David Chambers, John P. Converse
Unfinished Business	George W. Baird, Richard W. Cahill, David McConnell	Isaac Houseman, John P. Converse
Judiciary	Le Grand Byington, Caleb J. McNulty, Elihu Johnson	John Probasco, Thomas M. Kelley
Finance	Joel B. McFarland, Henry C. Brish, John Larwill	Thomas Earl, Isaac Atkinson
Banks and the Currency	Edson B. Olds, George W. Sharp, Le Grand Byington, Archibald Gordon	Nathaniel Dike
Public Works	Jesse Meredith, Gilman C. Mudgett, Wilson Nelson	Hiram Campbell, David Chambers
Common Schools, Colleges and Universities	Henry C. Brish, Isaac Green, Isaac E. James	Otway Curry, Simeon Fuller
Medical Colleges and Medical Societies	James P. Henderson, John C. Clark, Phelps Humphrey	J. B. Ackley, Charles Bowen
Roads and Highways	Cornelius Okey, John Martin, William Wakefield	Joseph Chenowith, Amos Seward
Public Lands	Caleb J. McNulty, Jesse Meredith, James B. Steedman	David Fisher, John McClure
Agriculture and Manufactures	Israel Brown, Joseph Wilford, William Douglass	Newton Larsh, Nathan Webb
Claims	John Larwill, Gilman C. Mudgett, Moses Rees	David Chambers, Amos Seward
The Militia	Jesse Meredith, George W. Sharp, John D. White	Thomas Earl, Robert Robinson
The National Road	Isaac Green, William McClung, Thomas Pilcher	John M. Gallagher, John Fudge
Rail Roads	David McConnell, Richard W. Cahill, George W. Baird	William B. McCrea. John P. Converse
New Counties	James B. King, Daniel Kelley, James Kilgore	Jacob H. Baldwin, Robert Robinson
The Library	Thomas Pilcher, Phelps Humphrey, John Reid	George W. Woodbridge, Otway Curry
Public Buildings	Daniel Kelly, Rudolphus Martin, John D. White	John Probasco, Jacob Counts
Public Institutions	John C. Clark, Nicholas Spindlar, Richard Warner	Jonathan Tuttle, Thomas Ross
Corporations	Elihu Johnson, Richard Warner, James Kilgore	Robert C. Schenck, Thomas Ross
The Penitentiary	William McClung, John Reid, (Note: Contemporary source ostensibly contains a typo and calls the representative "Reed". The name is close enough to "Rees" that it could also mean Moses Rees. Nevertheless, both were Democrats.) Cornelius Okey	Charles Bowen, Samuel H. Pardee
Public Printing	James B. Steedman, John Gruber, Rudolphus Martin	George W. Woodbridge, John A. Smith
The Public Debt	James P. Henderson, John Gruber, Edson B. Olds	Robert C. Schenck, Samuel Atherton
Enrollment	Gilman C. Mudgett	John M. Gallagher

== Notes ==
Preceded by 40th Ohio General Assembly	41st Ohio General Assembly; 1842—1843	Succeeded by 42nd Ohio General Assembly
