= Ephraim Kibbey =

American politician

- Born: November 20, 1756; Somers, Connecticut
- Died: April 22, 1809 (aged 52); Deerfield, now South Lebanon, Ohio
- Resting place: Deerfield Cemetery, South Lebanon, Ohio
- Occupation: Soldier
- Spouse: Phebe Ann (Crane)
- Children: 7

Ephraim Kibbey (1754 or 1756 – 1809) was a United States soldier in the American Revolution, a frontiersman and early settler of Ohio, the leader of Mad Anthony Wayne's famous forty scouts in the Northwest Indian War, and a member of the 1st Ohio General Assembly. He was a contemporary of Daniel Boone, Simon Kenton, Benjamin Stites and Simon Girty.

== Family and early life ==
Ephraim Kibbey was a descendant of Edward Kibbe (born 1597 or 1611, died November 1694), an early settler of the Massachusetts Bay Colony, who immigrated from England about 1639.

== Noted activities ==
Ephraim enlisted in 1777 at Essex, New Jersey in the Continental Army. He endured the brutal winter of 1777-1778 at Valley Forge with George Washington under the command of Capt. Jacob Martin in General William Marshall's 4th New Jersey Regiment and was eventually assigned to Capt. Seth Johnson's company of the 3rd New Jersey Regiment under Col. Elias Dayton.

Following the American Revolution, Kibbey spent time in the frontier of southwestern Pennsylvania before proceeding, with Benjamin Stites and several other pioneers, to settle the Symmes Purchase with the establishment of Columbia, Ohio, just upriver from the future location of Cincinnati, in 1788. All that remains today of this settlement is the Pioneer Memorial Cemetery, Cincinnati, including a large monument erected in 1879 dedicated "To the First Boat-Load."

Anthony Wayne and his Legion of the United States relied heavily on the famous forty (72) scouts led by then-Captain Kibbey in their fight against the Western Confederacy. The scouts were selected from among the finest frontiersmen and Indian fighters, and had several notable forays assisting the Legion in leading to victory at the Battle of Fallen Timbers.

Kibbey was among the first settlers of Deerfield, now South Lebanon, Ohio about 1795 and participated in the defense of the new settlements and in surveying and cutting roads, notably the then-called Kibbey's Road, the first road across the state of Indiana to Vincennes, Indiana.

He was later elected to the Legislature of the Northwest Territory in 1798 and 1802 and served from 1803 to 1804 in the 1st Ohio General Assembly.

Ephraim died at Deerfield, now South Lebanon, Ohio, in 1809.

== Marriage and family ==
Kibbey and his wife, Phebe Ann (Crane) (1758-1813), had 7 children: John Crane, Elisabeth, Joseph, Julia Ann, Jerusha, Ephraim, and Phebe. John Crane Kibbey's son, John F. Kibbey, was the third Indiana Attorney General, and John F.'s son was Joseph Henry Kibbey, Territorial Governor of Arizona.
