= John Thompson (Louisiana judge) =

American judge

John Thompson (died 1810) was a registrar of lands in the Western District of the Territory of Orleans and judge of the Superior Court of the Territory of Orleans.

Thompson came to Louisiana from Kentucky in 1805 and was charged with opening the Western District land office in Opelousas, Louisiana. On September 17, 1808, Thompson was appointed by President Thomas Jefferson to be a judge of the Superior Court of the Territory of Orleans in place of William Sprigg who had returned to the Ohio Supreme Court.

Thompson died on January 30, 1810 in Opelousas, Louisiana and was succeeded by Francois Xavier Martin.

Legal offices
Preceded by William Sprigg	Judge of the Superior Court of the Territory of Orleans; 1808–1810	Succeeded by Francois Xavier Martin
