= William W. Irvin =

American judge

William Irvin
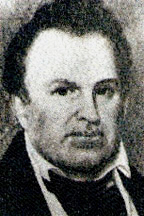

Member of the U.S. House of Representatives from Ohio's 9th district
- In office March 4, 1829 – March 3, 1833
- Preceded by: Philemon Beecher
- Succeeded by: John Chaney

Associate Justice of the Ohio Supreme Court
- In office April 2, 1810 – February 16, 1816
- Preceded by: William Sprigg
- Succeeded by: Jessup Nash Couch

Member of the Ohio House of Representatives
- In office 1806–1807

Personal details
- Born: April 5, 1779 Charlottesville, Virginia, U.S.
- Died: March 27, 1842 (aged 62) Lancaster, Ohio, U.S.
- Party: Jacksonian
- Spouse: Elizabeth Gillespie
- Children: 7

William W. Irvin (April 5, 1779 – March 27, 1842) also spelled Irwin was a 19th-century lawyer, farmer, politician, and two-term U.S. representative from Ohio from 1829 to 1833.

== Biography ==
Born near Charlottesville, Virginia, Irvin pursued an academic course and later studied law. He was admitted to the bar in 1800 and commenced practice in his native county. He moved to Lancaster, Ohio, about 1801 and continued the practice of his profession.

=== Early political career ===
He was appointed by an April 9, 1803 joint session of the Ohio Senate and Ohio House to serve as an associate judge of the court of common pleas for Fairfield County by the first general assembly. He was impeached in on February 22, 1805 by the Ohio House of Representatives. His impeachment trial before the Ohio Senate began on December 9, 1805, and he was convicted and removed from by an 11–4 vote on January 11, 1806.

Irvin served as member of the Ohio House of Representatives in 1806 and 1807, and was a justice of the Supreme Court of Ohio from 1810 to 1815. He finished third in election for Governor of Ohio in 1822. He was again a member of the Ohio House of Representatives 1825–27 and served as speaker in 1825 and 1826. He came in third for election to the United States Senate in 1827, losing to Benjamin Ruggles.

=== Congress ===
Irvin was elected as a Jacksonian to the Twenty-first and Twenty-second Congresses (March 4, 1829 – March 3, 1833). He was an unsuccessful candidate for reelection in 1832 to the Twenty-third Congress.

=== Death ===
He returned to his farm near Lancaster and engaged in agricultural pursuits until his death on March 27, 1842.

=== Personal life ===
Irvin was married to Elizabeth B. Gillespie in Lancaster on February 2, 1813. They had seven children.

== Sources ==
- United States Congress. "William W. Irvin (id: I000034)". Biographical Directory of the United States Congress.
- Taylor, William Alexander; Taylor, Aubrey Clarence (1899). Ohio statesmen and annals of progress: from the year 1788 to the year 1900 ... State of Ohio. p. 129.

U.S. House of Representatives
| Preceded by Philemon Beecher | Member of the U.S. House of Representatives from Ohio's 9th congressional district 1829–1833 | Succeeded by John Chaney |
