= James Pritchard (politician) =

American politician (1763–1813)

Speaker of the Ohio Senate
- In office February 21, 1805 – November 30, 1806
- Preceded by: Daniel Symmes
- Succeeded by: Thomas Kirker

Personal details
- Born: November 1, 1763 Frederick County, Maryland
- Died: February 6, 1813 (aged 49) Chillicothe, Ohio
- Party: Democratic-Republican
- Spouses: Tabitha White; Sally Huston

James Pritchard (November 1, 1763– February 6, 1813) was an American Revolutionary War veteran and Democratic-Republican politician who served in the legislatures of the Northwest Territory, and later in Ohio, and was unsuccessful in runs for congress.

== Early life ==
James Pritchard was born November 1, 1763, in Frederick County, Maryland. He served as a private in the Maryland line during the American Revolutionary War. He was married to Tabitha White, and they lived in Pennsylvania before moving to the Northwest Territory.

== Northwest Territory ==
Pritchard was an early settler in Knox Township and one of the early members of the Sugar Grove Methodist church, the first church in that township. He was a lieutenant-colonel of the county militia, and as an associate judge of Jefferson County he helped lay out the county into five townships.

Pritchard was elected as the representative of Jefferson County to the House of Representatives of the Northwest Territory in 1799. He became a leader of the movement toward statehood, allied with other Republicans Edward Tiffin, Thomas Worthington and Nathaniel Massie. After a constitution was approved in 1802, elections were held for the first Ohio legislature in January, 1803. Jefferson County was the only place where Federalists were elected, and Pritchard suspected election fraud and filed a protest, which was over-ruled.

== State Government ==
The Federalists fell out of favor in Jefferson County, and Pritchard was elected to the Ohio State Senate in 1804, for a two-year term. He became Speaker of the Senate in February, 1805 when Daniel Symmes resigned, and was chosen again for the 1805-'6 session. He was also chosen as a Presidential elector that autumn, and cast a ballot for Thomas Jefferson.

In 1806 Ohio had one At-large congressional district, and Pritchard ran against incumbent Jeremiah Morrow. He lost, failing to carry his home county. After failing in election to the Ohio Senate in 1807, he won election to the Ohio House of Representatives in 1808, ran for speaker, and finished second. He was elected again in 1809, and again finished second for speaker. He was re-elected in 1810. During the 1810-1811 session, the legislature elected him an associate judge of Jefferson County.

In 1811, Pritchard was again elected to the Ohio Senate for a two-year term. He was a presidential elector in 1812, and cast a ballot for James Madison. He finished third in another run for congress in 1812.

In August, 1808, Pritchard was widowed when Tabitha Pritchard died, leaving him with several children. He remarried to Sally Huston in February, 1810. Pritchard died while the legislature was meeting on February 6, 1813, in Chillicothe, Ohio.

== Notes ==
Ohio Senate
Preceded by Bezaleel Wells; John Milligan	Senator from Jefferson County; December 3, 1804-November 30, 1806; Served alongside: John Milligan (1804-'5); Benjamin Hough (1805-'6)	Succeeded by John Taggart; Benjamin Hough
Preceded by John McLaughlin; Thomas Elliott	Senator from Jefferson County; December 2, 1811-February 6, 1813; Served alongside: Daniel Welch (1811-'2); Joseph McMillan (1812-'3)	Succeeded by John McLaughlin; Joseph McMillan
Ohio House of Representatives
Preceded by Thomas Elliott; Benjamin Hough; Thomas McCune	Representative from Jefferson County; December 5, 1808-December 1, 1811; Served alongside: Samuel Dunlap; Thomas McCune (1808-'9); George Humphrey (1809-'10); Andrew McNealy (1810-'1); Stephen Ford (1809-'11)	Succeeded by George Day; Thomas McCune; James Ford
