= Bezaleel Wells =

American politician and landowner (1773–1846)

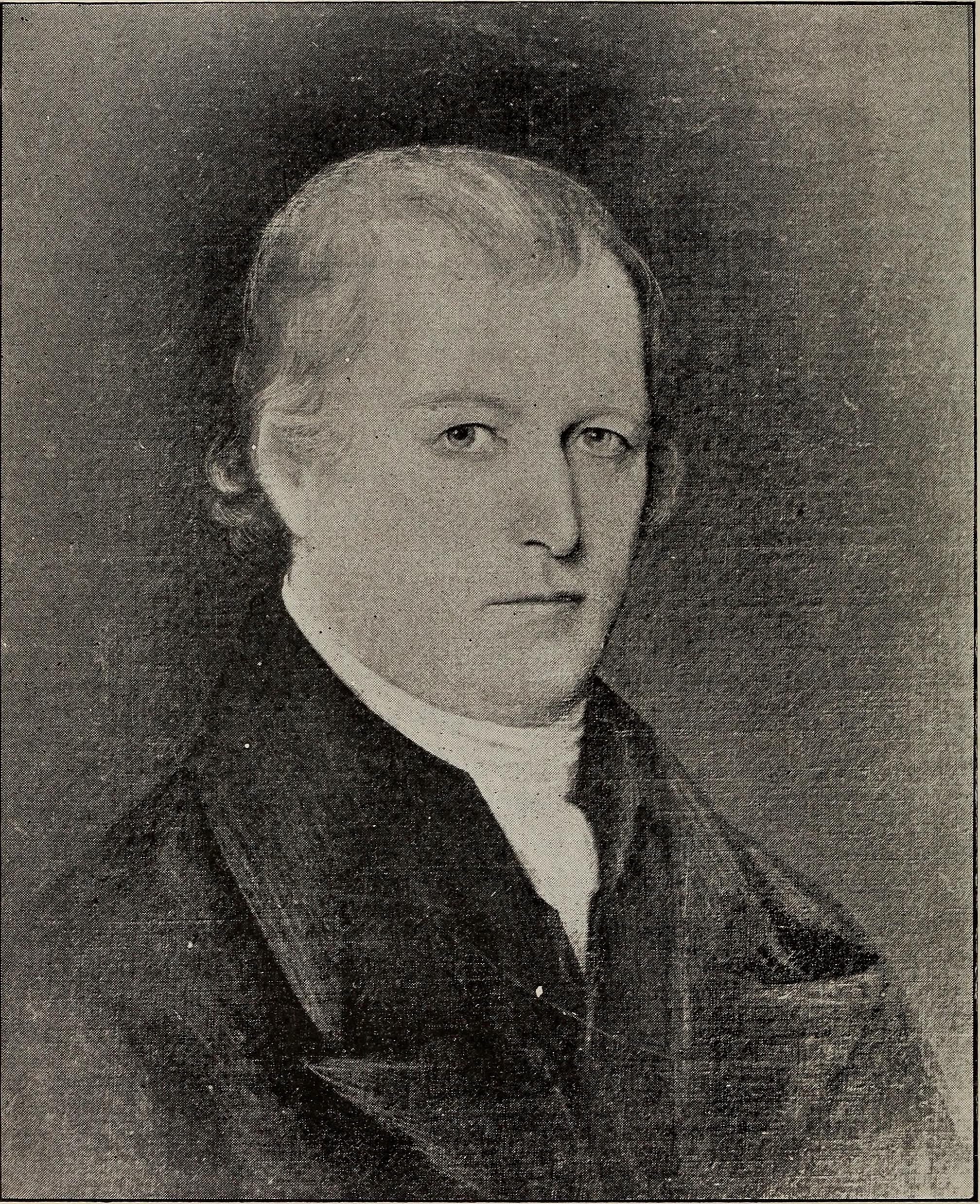
- Wells in 1887 publication

Member of the Ohio Senate from the Jefferson County district
- In office March 1, 1803 – December 2, 1804 Serving with Zenas Kimberly; John Milligan
- Preceded by: new seat
- Succeeded by: James Pritchard; John Milligan

Personal details
- Born: January 28, 1773 near Baltimore, Province of Maryland
- Died: August 14, 1846 (aged 73)
- Resting place: Union Cemetery; Steubenville, Ohio, U.S.
- Party: Federalist
- Spouse(s): Rebecca Reasteau (died 1797) Sarah Griffith (m. 1798)
- Children: 13
- Education: William and Mary College
- Occupation: Politician; judge; surveyor; landowner; real estate manager; bank president; farmer

Bezaleel Wells (January 28, 1773 – August 14, 1846) was an American politician, judge, surveyor and landowner from Ohio. He was known as the founder of Steubenville and Canton. He was a member of the Ohio Senate, representing Jefferson County from 1803 to 1804.

== Early life ==
Bezaleel Wells was born on January 28, 1773, in St. Thomas Parish near Baltimore, Maryland, to Leah (née Owings) and Alexander Wells. His father was a self-taught surveyor. His grandfather James Wells emigrated from England. At the age of 10, Wells's family moved to Cross Creek in Washington County, Pennsylvania, but Wells remained with an uncle. At the age of 13, Wells moved with his parents to Wellsburg, West Virginia (then Charles Town). His father was the namesake of Wellsburg. His father bought property in the area, including a tannery, grist mill, fulling mill and distillery. Wells studied surveying and graduated from the William and Mary College. He then moved to Cross Creek to live with his family.

== Career ==
=== Land purchases and the founding of Steubenville and Canton ===
Wells worked as a surveyor in Washington County, Pennsylvania. He partnered with James Ross, a U.S. senator and lawyer from Pittsburgh, in buying land. Their first purchase was on October 24, 1796. Wells then laid out the land that would become Steubenville in 1797. Wells was appointed as probate judge by Winthrop Sargent. He served in that role from 1797 to November 29, 1802. In 1797, he was also appointed prothonotary to the court of common pleas and clerk. He served as clerk until 1800. On March 27, 1805, and on May 14, 1805, Wells purchased land at the land office in Steubenville. On November 15, 1805, Wells laid out the land that would later become Canton. By 1809, Wells was the largest landowner and real estate manager in Ohio. Wells donated to Canton his personal holdings; these holdings would become the Christ United Presbyterian Church, Timken Vocational High School and McKinley Park (originally a cemetery). He advocated for Canton to be the county seat of Stark County and Canton became the county seat on January 1, 1809.

=== Political career ===
Wells was a member of the Ohio Constitutional Convention in October 1802. Wells served as a member of the Ohio Senate, alongside Zenas Kimberly representing Jefferson County, during the first two terms, in the 1st Ohio General Assembly and 2nd Ohio General Assembly (1803 to 1804). He was elected in January 1803. He served from March 1, 1803, to March 1804. As senator, Wells advocated for public roads in the area. He tried to get the National Road to go through Steubenville, but was unsuccessful. He was a Trustee of Ohio University from 1804 to 1808. Wells ran for Ohio's 4th congressional district in 1812, finishing second. He tried again in 1814, and again finished second.

=== Other endeavors ===
In 1800, Wells built a copperas works in Steubenville near Wells Run. He later partnered with Augustine Koelb. That business lasted until 1843. In 1802, he built a grist and saw mill in Steubenville. On January 10, 1810, the Steubenville Water Company was formed and Wells was one of its incorporators. It was the first water company incorporated in Ohio. Wells served as the first president of The Steubenville Bank, which he helped establish in 1809 with William R. Dickinson. It was the third bank established in Ohio.

In 1814, Wells left the Canton area. He then worked in banking, raised Merino sheep and built a wool factory in Steubenville. Wells bought the sheep in Vermont and built the wool factory with Samuel Patterson, James Ross and Henry Baldwin. The business opened on April 10, 1815. The factory was reportedly the first wool factory west of the Allegheny Mountains and the third largest manufacturing plant in Ohio of the time. It was originally named B. Wells & Co., but was later renamed Wells & Dickinson. In 1819, Benjamin Tappan became a partner of the wool factory. The factory closed in March 1830. Wells's business ventures were not successful and led him to go to debtors' prison in Steubenville. He also built a distillery at Rockville in Steubenville. His son Alexander gave Wells a farm and he lived on the farm in Steubenville until his death.

In 1819, Wells built a steamer named Bezaleel Wells. He owned it with Samuel Chapman, Adam Moderwell and Ambrose Shaw. He was chairman of the committee that selected the site for Kenyon College. He was a trustee of the college from 1825 to 1831 and from 1840 to 1842. He was a trustee of a female academy that opened in Steubenville in 1829.

== Personal life ==
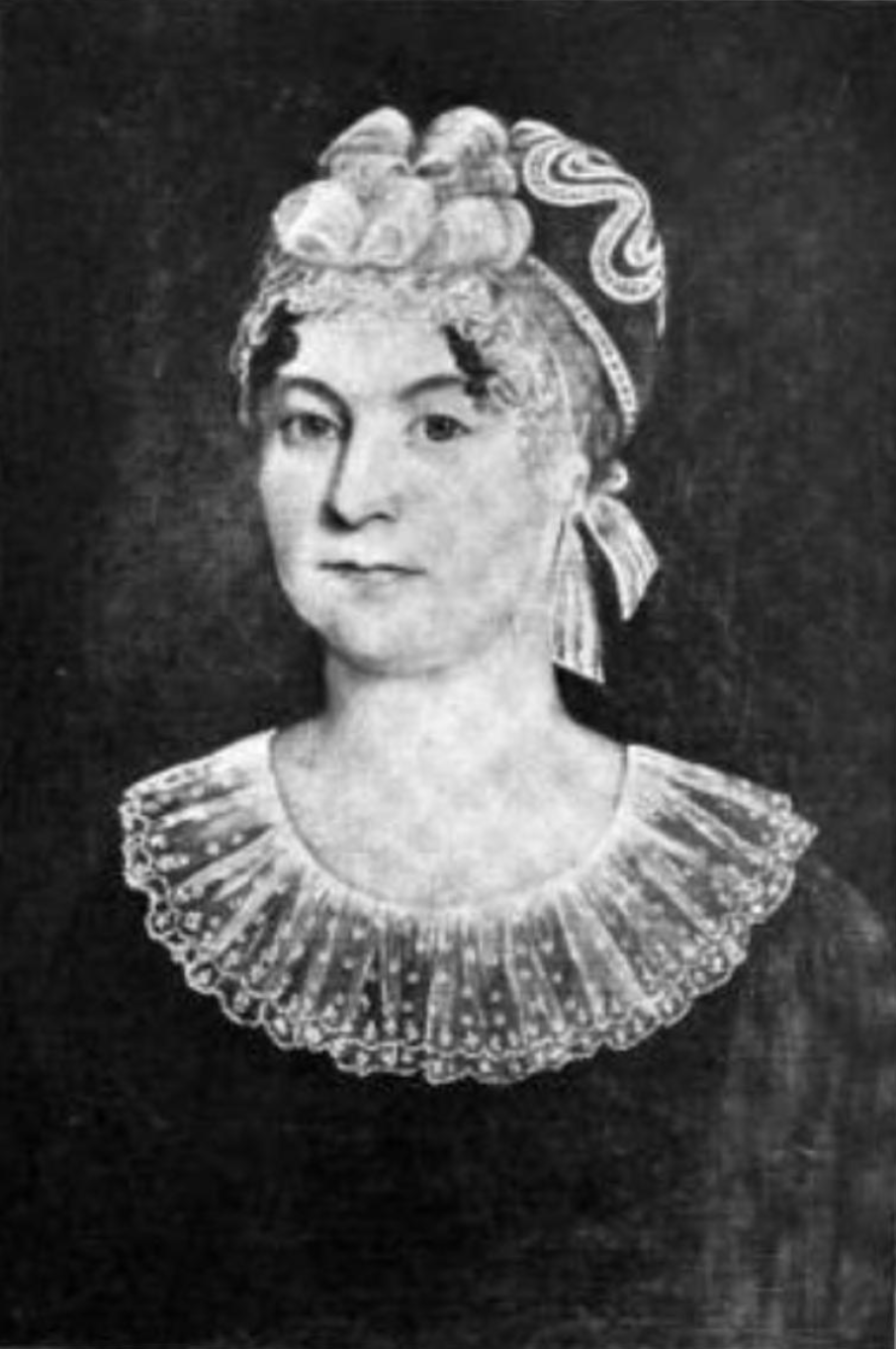
Painting of Sarah Griffith Wells by Stein, c. 1830

Wells married Rebecca Reasteau. They had two children, but they died in childhood. His wife died in 1797. He married Sarah Griffith of Rockville, Maryland, in 1798. They had six sons and five daughters, including Francis, John B., Rebecca and Sarah. His wife died in 1839. His daughter Rebecca married Philander Chase Jr., son of Philander Chase. Wells was a senior warden at St. Paul's Episcopal Church.

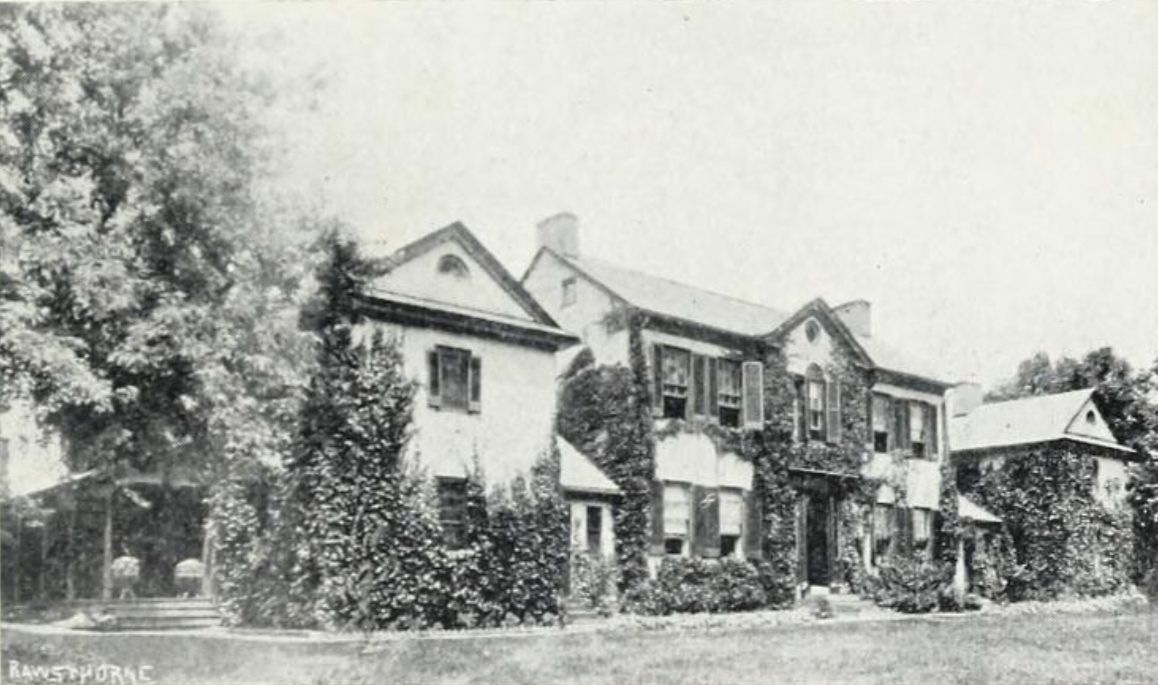
"The Grove" in 1897 publication

From 1798 to 1800, Wells built a manor house called "The Grove" in Steubenville. In 1830, due to bankruptcy, Wells sold "The Grove" to Samuel Stokely. In 1832, Wells lived at a new home on his son Alexander's farm.

Wells died on August 14, 1846. He was initially buried at a graveyard on 4th Street in Steubenville. He was re-buried at the family lot at Union Cemetery in Steubenville.

== Legacy ==
In 1853, the locomotive Bezaleel Wells of the Baltimore and Ohio Railroad arrived in Steubenville, named after Wells.

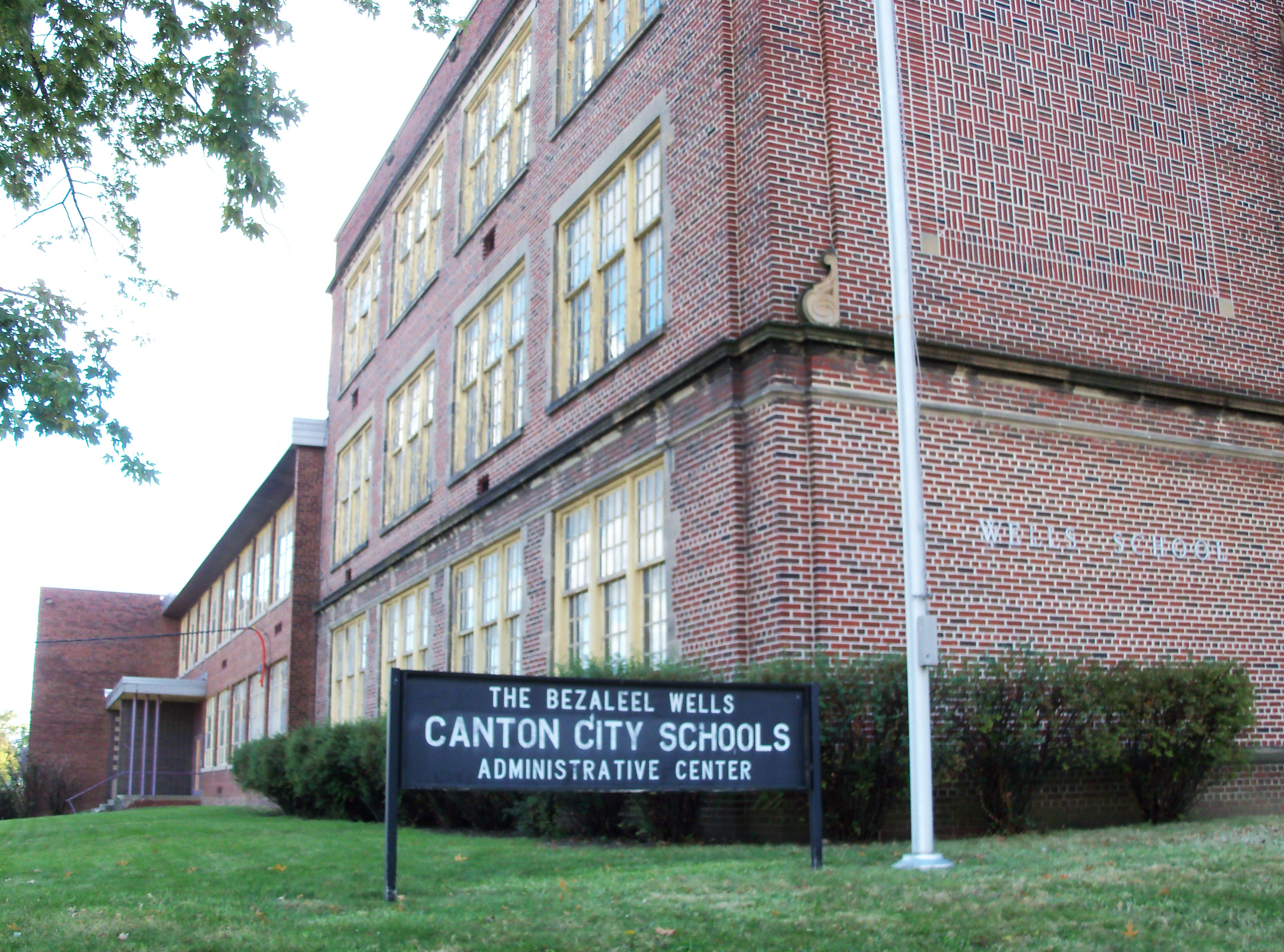
Wells School in 2010

A school, built in 1876, originally called Plum Street School and for a time named Wells School, was named after Wells. The school was later renamed the McKinley Grade School. In 1918, the McKinley High School was built and the McKinley Grade School was renamed the Wells School. Wells Avenue in Canton was also named after Wells. Wells Township was named after Wells.

== Sources ==
- Walker, Charles M (1869). History of Athens County, Ohio And Incidentally of the Ohio Land Company and the First Settlement of the State at Marietta etc. Robert Clarke & Company. pp. 346–348.
