= William Sprigg (judge) =

American judge (1770–1827)

Justice of the Ohio Supreme Court
- In office April 2, 1803 – April 12, 1806
- Preceded by: none (state established)
- Succeeded by: George Tod

Judge of the Superior Court of the Orleans Territory
- In office 1806–1808

Justice of the Ohio Supreme Court
- In office February 16, 1808 – February 10, 1810
- Preceded by: Daniel Symmes
- Succeeded by: William W. Irvin

Justice of the Illinois Territorial Court
- In office 1809 – April 1818
- Preceded by: Obediah Jones
- Succeeded by: Thomas C. Browne

Personal details
- Born: 1770; Prince George's County, Maryland
- Died: September 9, 1827; Hagerstown, Maryland

William Sprigg (1770 – September 9, 1827) was an American attorney who twice served as Justice of the Ohio Supreme Court, as well as adjudicated on the Superior Court of the Orleans Territory and the highest court of the Illinois Territory.

== Early life ==
Sprigg was born in 1770 in Prince George's County, Maryland to Joseph Sprigg and Hannah Lee. His uncle, Thomas Sprigg, was a Member of Congress from Maryland from 1793 to 1797. His half-brother, Samuel Sprigg, was Governor of Maryland from 1818 to 1820.

== Career ==
Sprigg headed westward to Hagerstown and Cumberland, Maryland (where relatives were merchants) then continued along the Ohio River. He became a pioneer and early attorney in Adams County, Ohio, then in the Northwest Territory. When Ohio became a state in 1803, the state legislature appointed Sprigg to the Ohio Supreme Court. He served as a justice of the Supreme Court from April 1803 to April 1806, and again from 1808 to 1810. During the interim period, Sprigg received an appointment from President Thomas Jefferson to serve on the highest court in the Territory of Orleans, which he did from January 1806 to November 1808.

In 1812, Governor Ninian Edwards of the newly formed Illinois Territory appointed Sprigg as a judge for that territory. Sprigg served on the Illinois court for several years alongside Jesse B. Thomas and Stanley Griswold. However, when Illinois was on the verge of becoming a state, he and Thomas became the center of controversy about the relative relationship between the judicial and legislative branches, and both wrote to the U.S. Congress. By April, 1818 Judge Sprigg was either removed or had resigned from the bench. When Illinois became a state in December 1818, the Illinois House of Representatives approved none of the territorial judges to the newly formed Illinois Supreme Court. Sprigg sought nomination for Judge of the United States District Court for the District of Illinois, but failed.

== Death and legacy ==
Judge Spriggs returned eastward, moving to Hagerstown, Maryland, where he died among relatives on September 9, 1827. Sprigg Township in Adams County, Ohio is named for Judge Sprigg.

Legal offices
Preceded by newly created position	Judge of the Ohio Supreme Court; 1803-1806	Succeeded by George Tod
Preceded by Peter Stephen Duponceau	Judge of the Superior Court of the Territory of Orleans; 1805-1807	Succeeded by John Thompson
Preceded by Daniel Symmes	Judge of the Ohio Supreme Court; 1808-1810	Succeeded by William W. Irvin
Preceded by Obadiah Jones	Judge of the Superior Court of the Territory of Illinois; 1815-1818	Succeeded by Thomas C. Browne
