= Representative history of the Ohio Senate =

The Ohio Senate has elected members from 33 districts since 1967. Currently, each district consists of approximately 345,000 Ohioans.

== Defunct districts ==
Until 1982, the 31st district existed in the eastern Cleveland metro, dating to 1967. It was eliminated following the 1980 census, and a new district was created in central Ohio.

Senator	Party	Term	Notes
Robert Stockdale	Republican	January 3, 1963 – December 31, 1974	Stockdale opted not to seek re-election in 1974.
Tim McCormack	Democrat	January 3, 1975 – December 31, 1982	McCormack's district eliminated following the 1980 census.

== See also ==
- List of Ohio state legislatures
