= John Chaney (Ohio politician) =

American politician (1790–1881)

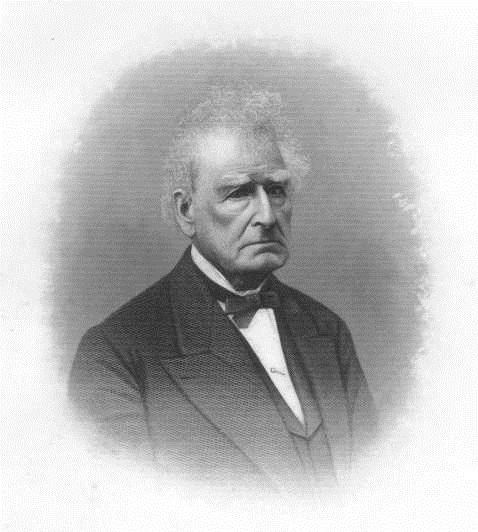

Member of the U.S. House of Representatives from Ohio's 9th district
- In office March 4, 1833 – March 3, 1839
- Preceded by: William W. Irvin
- Succeeded by: William Medill

Member of the Ohio House of Representatives
- In office 1828-1830

Personal details
- Born: January 12, 1790 Washington County, Maryland, U.S.
- Died: April 10, 1881 (aged 91) Canal Winchester, Ohio, U.S.
- Resting place: Union Grove Cemetery, Canal Winchester, Ohio
- Party: Democratic
- Spouse: Mary Ann LaFere
- Relatives: Lon Chaney (great-grandson); Lon Chaney Jr. (great-great-grandson)
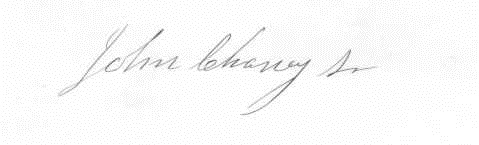
- Signature

John Chaney (January 12, 1790 – April 10, 1881) was a U.S. representative from Ohio for three terms from 1833 to 1839.

== Biography ==
Born in Washington County, Maryland, the son of Susanna and Nathan Cheney, Chaney moved with his parents to Pennsylvania. He received a limited schooling. He moved to Ohio in 1810 and settled in Bloom Township, Fairfield County, Ohio. He engaged in agricultural pursuits. Chaney married Mary Ann LaFere of Bloom Township in 1816. He was in the Justice of the Peace in 1821, 1824, and 1827. Trustee of Bloom Township for twenty-three years. Major, colonel, and paymaster in the Ohio State Militia. He served as member of the State house of representatives 1828-1830.

Chaney was elected associate judge of Fairfield County in 1831. Ohio Presidential elector in 1832 for Andrew Jackson. Chaney was elected as a Jacksonian to the Twenty-third and Twenty-fourth Congresses and as a Democrat to the Twenty-fifth Congress (March 4, 1833 – March 3, 1839). He returned to Ohio and settled in Canal Winchester, Franklin County. He was again a member of the Ohio House of Representatives in 1842 and served as speaker. He served as member of the village council. He served in the Ohio State Senate in 1844 and 1845. He was again a member of the state house of representatives in 1855. He served as a delegate to the Ohio constitutional convention in 1851.

=== Death ===
He died at Canal Winchester, Ohio, April 10, 1881. He was interred in Union Grove Cemetery.

John Chaney was the great-grandfather of the famous actor Lon Chaney, and the great-great-grandfather of Lon Chaney's son, Lon Chaney Jr.

== Sources ==
- United States Congress. "John Chaney (id: C000300)". Biographical Directory of the United States Congress.
- Taylor, William Alexander; Taylor, Aubrey Clarence (1899). Ohio statesmen and annals of progress: from the year 1788 to the year 1900 ... Vol. 1. State of Ohio. p. 193.
- Scott, Hervey (1877). A Complete History of Fairfield County, Ohio. Columbus: Siebert and Lilly. pp. 161–165.

U.S. House of Representatives
Preceded by William W. Irvin	United States Representative from Ohio's 9th congressional district 1833–1839	Succeeded by William Medill
Ohio House of Representatives
Preceded by William W. Irvin; Samuel Spangler	Representative from Fairfield County; 1828-1831; Served alongside: Samuel Spangler; David Ewing	Succeeded by Samuel Spangler; David Ewing
Ohio House of Representatives
Preceded by William McClung	Representative from Fairfield County; 1842-1843; Served alongside: William McClung	Succeeded by Jacob Greene; Joseph Sharp
Ohio House of Representatives
Preceded by Samuel H. Porter	Representative from Fairfield County; 1856-1857; Served alongside: David Lyle	Succeeded by B. W. Carlisle; T. W. Bigony
Ohio House of Representatives
Preceded by Rufus P. Spalding	Speaker of the House; 1842-1843	Succeeded by John M. Gallagher
Ohio Senate
Preceded by Nelson Franklin	Senator from Fairfield and Pickaway Counties; 1844-1846	Succeeded by Edson B. Olds
