= Historic Ohio Canals =

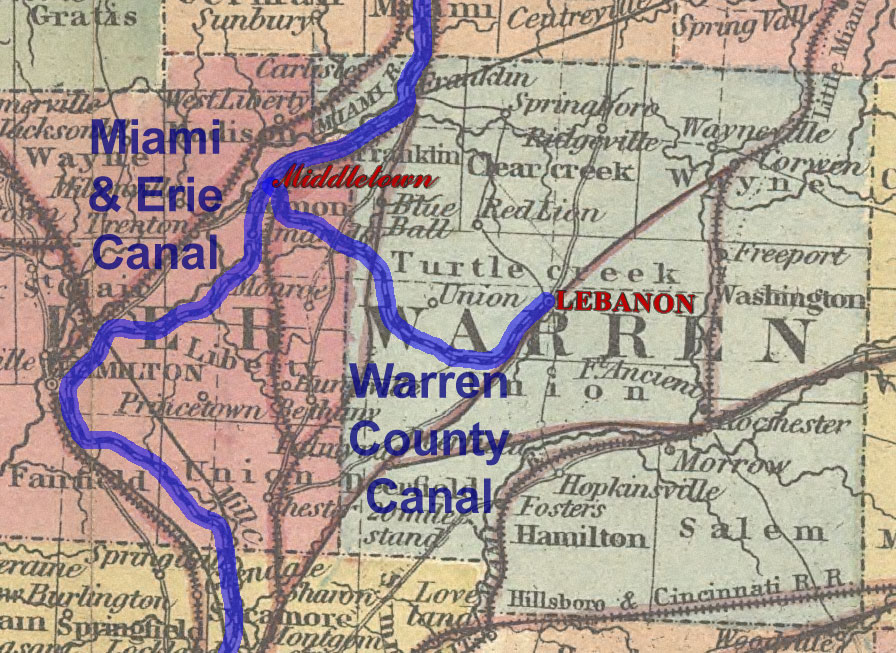
The Warren County Canal was a spur of the Miami and Erie Canal to Lebanon, the county seat of Warren County, Ohio.

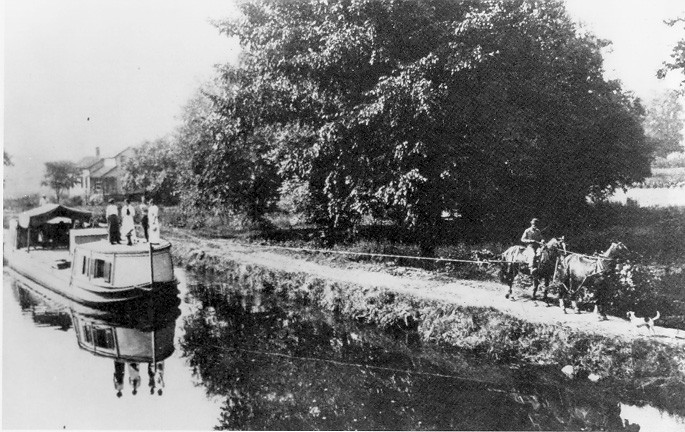
The Ohio and Erie Canal in 1902

Following is a list of historic canals that were once used for transportation in Ohio.

- Hocking Canal - Branch of Ohio and Erie Canal
- Miami and Erie Canal
- Ohio and Erie Canal
- Pennsylvania and Ohio Canal
- Sandy and Beaver Canal
- Wabash and Erie Canal
- Walhonding Canal
- Warren County Canal - Branch of Miami Erie Canal

== See also ==
- Canal
- List of canals in the United States
- Canal boat
- Ohio

External links

- Ohio DNR Plat map of Canals
- Ohio's Historic Canals
- Ohio Canal Map
- Miami & Erie Canal Corridor Association
- Lockington Locks Ohio Historical Society
