= Daniel Symmes =

American judge (1772–1817)

Justice of the Ohio Supreme Court
- In office February 7, 1805 – January 9, 1808
- Preceded by: Return J. Meigs, Jr.
- Succeeded by: William Sprigg

Personal details
- Born: 1772 Sussex County, New Jersey
- Died: May 10, 1817 (aged 44–45) Cincinnati, Ohio
- Spouse: Elizabeth Oliver
- Education: Princeton University

Daniel Symmes (1772 – May 10, 1817) was a politician in the U.S. State of Ohio in the Ohio State Senate, an Ohio Supreme Court Judge 1805–1808, Mayor of Cincinnati 1808–1809, and register of the Cincinnati land office.

Daniel Symmes was born at Sussex County, New Jersey. He was a nephew of the pioneer land speculator of southwest Ohio John Cleves Symmes. He was educated at Princeton College, and came west with his family, among the first settlers in the Miami Purchase.

In 1794, he was appointed Hamilton County Sheriff by Territorial Governor Arthur St. Clair. Symmes married Elizabeth Oliver on April 10, 1796, in North Bend, Ohio. Symmes practiced law in Cincinnati, and, in June 1803, he was elected to the first Board of Directors of the first bank established in the State of Ohio, the Miami Exporting Company of Cincinnati. In 1803 he was appointed Prosecuting Attorney for several counties.

Just after statehood, Symmes was elected to represent Hamilton County in the Ohio Senate for the first through third General Assemblies, 1803–1805. In 1805 the Ohio Legislature appointed him a judge of the Ohio Supreme Court, to fill the vacancy created when Return Jonathan Meigs, Jr. resigned.

In 1808–1809, Symmes served as President of the Cincinnati Council, (equivalent to Mayor).

Symmes was appointed register of the Cincinnati Land Office by President Jefferson, resigning from the court, and served for seven years.

Symmes died May 10, 1817, in Cincinnati. His wife remarried, to Thomas Graham, September 29, 1819.

== Notes ==
Political offices
Preceded by Martin Baum	Mayor of Cincinnati; 1808–1809	Succeeded by James Findlay
Legal offices
Preceded by Return J. Meigs, Jr.	Ohio Supreme Court Judges; 1805–1808	Succeeded by William Sprigg
Ohio Senate
Preceded by New Position	Senator from Hamilton County; 1803–1805; Served alongside: Jeremiah Morrow, John Paul, Francis Dunlavy; John Bigger, William Ward, William C. Schenck; Cornelius Sneider	Succeeded by Stephen Wood; Cornelius Sneider
