= Jeremiah Morrow =

American politician (1771–1852)

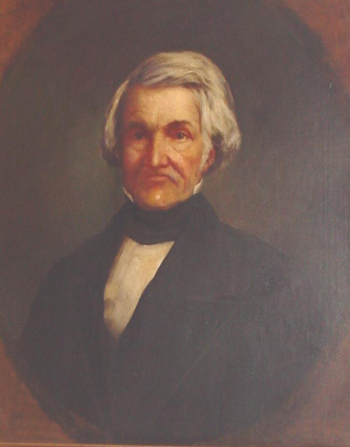

9th Governor of Ohio
- In office December 28, 1822 – December 19, 1826
- Preceded by: Allen Trimble
- Succeeded by: Allen Trimble

United States Senator from Ohio
- In office March 4, 1813 – March 3, 1819
- Preceded by: Alexander Campbell
- Succeeded by: William A. Trimble

Member of the U.S. House of Representatives from Ohio
- In office October 13, 1840 – March 3, 1843
- Preceded by: Thomas Corwin
- Succeeded by: Joseph Vance
- Constituency: 4th district
- In office October 17, 1803 – March 3, 1813
- Preceded by: District created
- Succeeded by: District eliminated
- Constituency: at-large

Member of the Ohio Senate from Hamilton County
- In office 1803
- Preceded by: new district
- Succeeded by: John Bigger; William C. Schenck; Daniel Symmes; William Ward

Personal details
- Born: October 6, 1771 Gettysburg, Province of Pennsylvania, British America
- Died: March 22, 1852 (aged 80) Lebanon, Ohio, U.S.
- Party: Democratic-Republican; Whig

Jeremiah Morrow (October 6, 1771 – March 22, 1852) was a Democratic-Republican Party politician from Ohio. He served as the ninth governor of Ohio, and was the last Democratic-Republican to hold that office. He also served as a United States Senator and a member of the United States House of Representatives from Ohio. He also served in the Ohio Senate.

== Biography ==
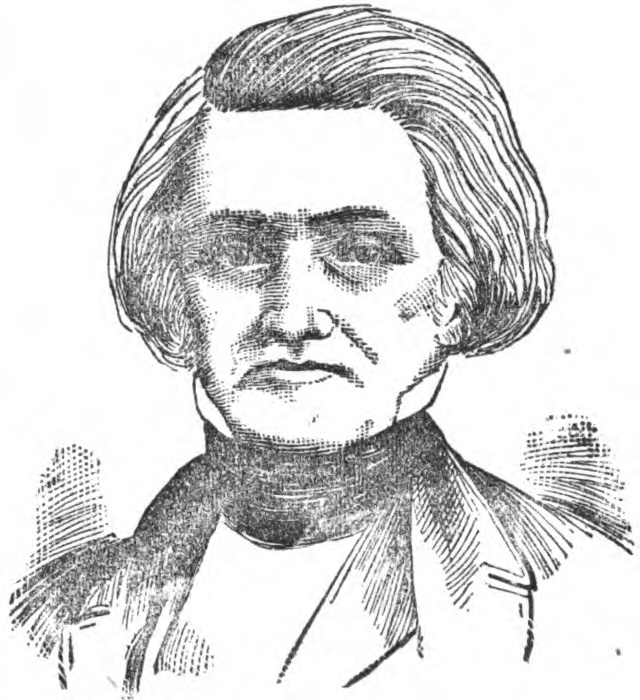
Sketch

Morrow was born near Gettysburg in the Province of Pennsylvania. He was of Scots-Irish descent, his Irish grandfather, also Jeremiah Morrow, had come to America from County Londonderry, and was descended from 17th-century Scottish settlers. He moved to the Northwest Territory in 1795. He lived at the mouth of the Little Miami River for a short time before moving to what is now Warren County. As a member of the Associate Reformed Presbyterian Church, he sought the services of a minister of his denomination soon after settling in the region, and he was one of the original elders of the Mill Creek congregation when it was organized shortly before 1800.

After serving in the Territorial House of Representatives and Territorial Senate, and as a Hamilton county delegate to the 1802 Constitutional Convention, he was elected to the first State Senate a year later and served six months before becoming Ohio's first member of the United States House of Representatives. Morrow won four additional full terms. He ran for the U.S. Senate in 1812 and served a single term from 1813 to 1819, and did not seek re-election. As such, he was the first U.S. Senator for Ohio to serve a full six-year term. Morrow was elected a member of the American Antiquarian Society in 1814. In 1820, he served as one of Ohio's Presidential electors for James Monroe. He won election to the governorship in 1822 and served for two two-year terms. He declined to serve a third term, instead returning to the Ohio House of Representatives and State Senate. Morrow was sent back to Washington again in 1840, to fill the vacancy of Thomas Corwin, and again served two and a half years in the House, but refused to be renominated in 1842, believing himself too old.

== Death and legacy ==
After retiring from politics, Morrow returned to his farm and gristmill in Warren County. He died in 1852.

Morrow is the namesake of the Jeremiah Morrow Bridge, the highest bridge in Ohio. Morrow County and Morrow, Ohio are named after him. His grandson, George E. Morrow, was a professor at the University of Illinois and Iowa State University, and was president of Oklahoma State University.

Political offices
Preceded by Allen Trimble	Governor of Ohio; 1822–1826	Succeeded by Allen Trimble
Ohio Senate
New district	Senator from Hamilton County; 1803; Served alongside: Francis Dunlavy, John Paul, Daniel Symmes	Succeeded by John Bigger; William C. Schenck; Daniel Symmes; William Ward as Senators from Hamilton, Warren, Montgomery, Butler, and Greene Counties
U.S. House of Representatives
Preceded by Paul Fearing (Northwest Territory)	Member of the U.S. House of Representatives from Ohio's at-large congressional district 1803–1813	Succeeded by John McLean, John Alexander, Duncan McArthur, James Caldwell, James Kilbourne, John S. Edwards
Preceded by Thomas Corwin	Member of the U.S. House of Representatives from Ohio's 4th congressional district 1840–1843	Succeeded by Joseph Vance
U.S. Senate
Preceded by Alexander Campbell	U.S. senator (Class 3) from Ohio; 1813–1819; Served alongside: Thomas Worthington, Joseph Kerr, Benjamin Ruggles	Succeeded by William A. Trimble
