= John Bigger =

American politician

Speaker of the Ohio House of Representatives
- In office December 3, 1821 – November 30, 1822
- Preceded by: Joseph Richardson
- Succeeded by: Joseph Richardson

Personal details
- Born: Pennsylvania
- Died: June 18, 1840 Warren County, Ohio
- Party: Democratic-Republican
- Children: Samuel Bigger

John Bigger was a politician in the early history of the U.S. state of Ohio. He served eight terms in the Ohio House of Representatives and thirteen in the Ohio State Senate, including one term as Speaker of the House.

John Bigger was a native of Pennsylvania and an early migrant to the Northwest Territory. He contracted with John Cleves Symmes to purchase land northwest of the current site of Lebanon, Ohio. This land fell outside of Symmes Purchase, and Bigger could not claim title to his land until Congress passed an act for relief of people in his position.

Bigger was elected to the Ohio House of Representatives in the 1st General Assembly, (1803), when his home was still in Hamilton County. Warren County was erected during this legislative session, and included Bigger's home. They also gave a charter to the "Miami Exporting Company", the first bank in the state. Bigger was named a member of the first directorate of that bank on June 16, 1803.

In 1803, Bigger was elected to the Ohio State Senate from a district that included his new county, and served in the 2nd through 4th General Assemblies, (1803–1806). He returned to the Senate for the 6th through 10th General Assemblies, (1807–1812), and 12th through 14th General Assemblies, (1813–1816).

Bigger served in the Ohio House of Representatives during the 18th through 21st General Assemblies, (1819–1823). He was elected Speaker of the House for the 20th General Assembly, (1821–1822). During that session, the legislature elected a Senator and apportioned congressional districts.

In 1824, Bigger was a Presidential elector for Henry Clay. He also returned to the House for the 23rd and 24th General Assemblies, (1824–1826). He was elected to the First State Board of Equalization of 1825–1826, and was selected chairman of the board.

In 1826, Bigger ran for Ohio Governor. He finished fourth of four contestants, with five percent of the vote.

Bigger returned to the State Senate for the 29th and 30th General Assemblies, (1830–1832), and to the House for the 32nd General Assembly, (1833–1834).

John Bigger died June 18, 1840, at his Warren County Farm. He was the father of Indiana Governor Samuel Bigger. Bigger was also a trustee of Miami University.
