= List of governors of Ohio =

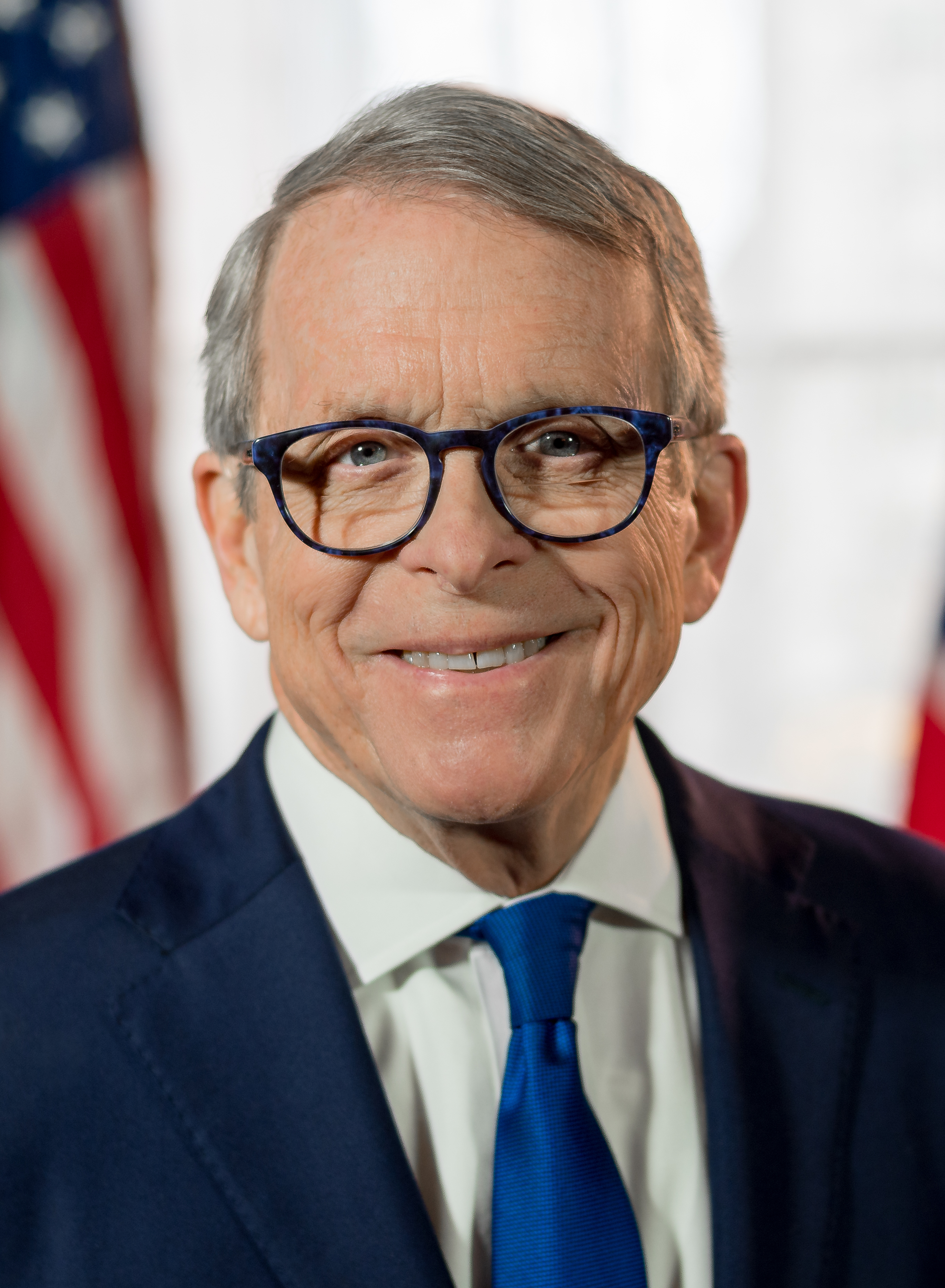
Mike DeWine has been governor since January 14, 2019.

The governor of Ohio is the head of government of the U.S. state of Ohio. There have been 64 governors of Ohio, serving 70 distinct terms. The longest term was held by Jim Rhodes, who was elected four times and served just under sixteen years in two non-consecutive periods of two terms each (1963–1971 and 1975–1983). The shortest terms were held by John William Brown and Nancy Hollister, who each served for only 11 days after the governors preceding them resigned in order to begin the terms to which they had been elected in the United States Senate; the shortest-serving elected governor was John M. Pattison, who died in office five months into his term.

The current governor is Republican Mike DeWine (R), who took office on January 14, 2019.

== List of governors ==
=== Northwest Territory ===
The Territory Northwest of the Ohio River, commonly known as the Northwest Territory, was organized on July 13, 1787. Many territories and states were split from Northwest Territory over the years, with the last portion being split between Indiana Territory and the newly admitted state of Ohio on March 1, 1803.

Throughout its 15-year history, Northwest Territory had only one governor appointed by the federal government, Arthur St. Clair. He was removed from office by President Thomas Jefferson on November 22, 1802, and no successor was named; Secretary of the Territory Charles Willing Byrd acted as governor until statehood.

Governor of the Territory Northwest of the River Ohio
Governor	Term in office	Appointed by
Arthur St. Clair (1737–1818)	October 5, 1787 (Note: St. Clair was appointed on October 5, 1787, by the Continental Congress, and he established the territorial government on July 15, 1788. He was reconfirmed by the Senate on August 20, 1789; December 11, 1794; January 12, 1798; and February 3, 1801.) – November 22, 1802 (5527 days; removed) (Note: St. Clair was removed due to political disagreements with President Thomas Jefferson. Secretary of the Territory Charles Willing Byrd acted as governor until statehood.)	Continental Congress
Arthur St. Clair (1737–1818)	October 5, 1787 – November 22, 1802 (5527 days; removed)	George Washington
Arthur St. Clair (1737–1818)	October 5, 1787 – November 22, 1802 (5527 days; removed)	John Adams

=== State of Ohio ===
Ohio was admitted to the Union on March 1, 1803. Since then, it has had 64 governors, six of whom (Allen Trimble, Wilson Shannon, Rutherford B. Hayes, James M. Cox, Frank Lausche, and Jim Rhodes) served non-consecutive terms.

The first constitution of 1803 allowed governors to serve for two-year terms, limited to six of any eight years, commencing on the first Monday in the December following an election. The current constitution of 1851 removed the term limit, and shifted the start of the term to the second Monday in January following an election. In 1908, Ohio switched from holding elections in odd-numbered years to even-numbered years, with the preceding governor (from the 1905 election) serving an extra year. A 1957 amendment lengthened the term to four years and allowed governors to only succeed themselves once, having to wait four years after their second term in a row before being allowed to run again.

Governors of the State of Ohio
No.	Governor	Term in office	Party	Election	Lt. Governor (Note: The office of lieutenant governor was created in 1851, first being filled in 1852.) (Note: Lieutenant governors represented the same party as their governor unless noted.)
1	Edward Tiffin (1766–1829)	March 3, 1803 – March 4, 1807 (1463 days; resigned) (Note: Tiffin resigned, having been elected to the United States Senate.)	Democratic- Republican	1803	Office did not exist
1	Edward Tiffin (1766–1829)	March 3, 1803 – March 4, 1807 (1463 days; resigned)	Democratic- Republican	1805	Office did not exist
2	Thomas Kirker (1760–1837)	March 4, 1807 – December 12, 1808 (650 days; lost election)	Democratic- Republican	Speaker of the Senate acting	Office did not exist
2	Thomas Kirker (1760–1837)	March 4, 1807 – December 12, 1808 (650 days; lost election)	Democratic- Republican	1807 (Note: Return J. Meigs Jr. won the 1807 election over Nathaniel Massie, but Massie contested, saying Meigs failed the residency requirement. The general assembly declared Meigs was ineligible and Massie had won, but Massie refused the office, and so Kirker remained in office until December 12, 1808, having lost the 1808 election.)	Office did not exist
3	Samuel Huntington (1765–1817)	December 12, 1808 – December 8, 1810 (727 days; retired) (Note: Huntington instead ran unsuccessfully for the United States Senate.)	Democratic- Republican	1808	Office did not exist
4	Return J. Meigs Jr. (1764–1825)	December 8, 1810 – March 25, 1814 (1204 days; resigned) (Note: Meigs resigned, having been confirmed as United States Postmaster General.)	Democratic- Republican	1810	Office did not exist
4	Return J. Meigs Jr. (1764–1825)	December 8, 1810 – March 25, 1814 (1204 days; resigned)	Democratic- Republican	1812	Office did not exist
5	Othniel Looker (1757–1845)	March 25, 1814 (Note: Sources disagree on if Meigs resigned on March 24 or March 25.) – December 8, 1814 (259 days; lost election)	Democratic- Republican	Speaker of the Senate acting	Office did not exist
6	Thomas Worthington (1773–1827)	December 8, 1814 – December 14, 1818 (1468 days; retired)	Democratic- Republican	1814	Office did not exist
6	Thomas Worthington (1773–1827)	December 8, 1814 – December 14, 1818 (1468 days; retired)	Democratic- Republican	1816	Office did not exist
7	Ethan Allen Brown (1776–1852)	December 14, 1818 – January 4, 1822 (1118 days; resigned) (Note: Brown resigned, having been elected to the United States Senate.)	Democratic- Republican	1818	Office did not exist
7	Ethan Allen Brown (1776–1852)	December 14, 1818 – January 4, 1822 (1118 days; resigned)	Democratic- Republican	1820	Office did not exist
8	Allen Trimble (1783–1870)	January 4, 1822 – December 28, 1822 (359 days; lost election)	Democratic- Republican	Speaker of the Senate acting	Office did not exist
9	Jeremiah Morrow (1771–1852)	December 28, 1822 – December 19, 1826 (1453 days; retired)	Democratic- Republican	1822	Office did not exist
9	Jeremiah Morrow (1771–1852)	December 28, 1822 – December 19, 1826 (1453 days; retired)	Democratic- Republican	1824	Office did not exist
10	Allen Trimble (1783–1870)	December 19, 1826 – December 18, 1830 (1461 days; retired)	National; Republican	1826	Office did not exist
10	Allen Trimble (1783–1870)	December 19, 1826 – December 18, 1830 (1461 days; retired)	National; Republican	1828	Office did not exist
11	Duncan McArthur (1772–1839)	December 18, 1830 – December 7, 1832 (721 days; retired) (Note: McArthur instead ran unsuccessfully for the United States House of Representatives.)	National; Republican	1830	Office did not exist
12	Robert Lucas (1781–1853)	December 7, 1832 – December 13, 1836 (1468 days; retired)	Democratic	1832	Office did not exist
12	Robert Lucas (1781–1853)	December 7, 1832 – December 13, 1836 (1468 days; retired)	Democratic	1834	Office did not exist
13	Joseph Vance (1786–1852)	December 13, 1836 – December 13, 1838 (731 days; lost election)	Whig	1836	Office did not exist
14	Wilson Shannon (1802–1877)	December 13, 1838 – December 16, 1840 (735 days; lost election)	Democratic	1838	Office did not exist
15	Thomas Corwin (1794–1865)	December 16, 1840 – December 14, 1842 (729 days; lost election)	Whig	1840	Office did not exist
16	Wilson Shannon (1802–1877)	December 14, 1842 – April 15, 1844 (489 days; resigned) (Note: Shannon resigned, having been confirmed as United States Minister to Mexico.)	Democratic	1842	Office did not exist
17	Thomas W. Bartley (1812–1885)	April 15, 1844 (Note: No contemporary sources found so far specify the date Shannon resigned; a notice appeared in the Columbus Statesman on April 15, 1844, but it does not specify that the resignation took place on that day. Modern sources use April 15.) – December 3, 1844 (233 days; lost nomination) (Note: Bartley lost the Democratic nomination to David Tod.)	Democratic	Speaker of the Senate acting	Office did not exist
18	Mordecai Bartley (1783–1870)	December 3, 1844 – December 12, 1846 (740 days; retired)	Whig	1844	Office did not exist
19	William Bebb (1802–1873)	December 12, 1846 – January 22, 1849 (773 days; retired)	Whig	1846	Office did not exist
20	Seabury Ford (1801–1855)	January 22, 1849 – December 12, 1850 (690 days; retired)	Whig	1848 (Note: Due to the large number of close elections that year, the general assembly was delayed in qualifying governor-elect Seabury Ford, and William Bebb remained in office for an extra few weeks.)	Office did not exist
21	Reuben Wood (d. 1864)	December 12, 1850 – July 13, 1853 (945 days; resigned) (Note: Wood resigned to be consul in Valparaíso, Chile.)	Democratic	1850	Office did not exist
21	Reuben Wood (d. 1864)	December 12, 1850 – July 13, 1853 (945 days; resigned)	Democratic	1851	William Medill
22	William Medill (1802–1865)	July 13, 1853 – January 14, 1856 (916 days; lost election)	Democratic	Succeeded from lieutenant governor	Vacant
22	William Medill (1802–1865)	July 13, 1853 – January 14, 1856 (916 days; lost election)	Democratic	1853	James Myers
23	Salmon P. Chase (1808–1873)	January 14, 1856 – January 9, 1860 (1457 days; retired) (Note: Chase was instead elected to the United States Senate.)	Republican	1855	Thomas H. Ford
23	Salmon P. Chase (1808–1873)	January 14, 1856 – January 9, 1860 (1457 days; retired)	Republican	1857	Martin Welker
24	William Dennison Jr. (1815–1882)	January 9, 1860 – January 13, 1862 (736 days; retired)	Republican	1859	Robert C. Kirk
25	David Tod (1805–1868)	January 13, 1862 – January 11, 1864 (729 days; lost nomination) (Note: Tod lost the Union nomination to John Brough.)	Union	1861	Benjamin Stanton
26	John Brough (1811–1865)	January 11, 1864 – August 29, 1865 (597 days; died in office)	Union	1863	Charles Anderson
27	Charles Anderson (1814–1895)	August 29, 1865 – January 8, 1866 (133 days; retired)	Union	Succeeded from lieutenant governor	Vacant
28	Jacob D. Cox (1828–1900)	January 8, 1866 – January 13, 1868 (736 days; retired)	Republican	1865	Andrew McBurney
29	Rutherford B. Hayes (1822–1893)	January 13, 1868 – January 8, 1872 (1457 days; retired)	Republican	1867	John C. Lee
29	Rutherford B. Hayes (1822–1893)	January 13, 1868 – January 8, 1872 (1457 days; retired)	Republican	1869	John C. Lee
30	Edward Follansbee Noyes (1832–1890)	January 8, 1872 – January 12, 1874 (736 days; lost election)	Republican	1871	Jacob Mueller
31	William Allen (1803–1879)	January 12, 1874 – January 10, 1876 (729 days; lost election)	Democratic	1873	Alphonso Hart (Note: Represented the Republican Party)
32	Rutherford B. Hayes (1822–1893)	January 10, 1876 – March 2, 1877 (418 days; resigned) (Note: Hayes resigned, having been elected President of the United States.)	Republican	1875	Thomas L. Young
33	Thomas L. Young (1832–1888)	March 2, 1877 – January 14, 1878 (319 days; retired)	Republican	Succeeded from lieutenant governor	H. W. Curtiss (acting)
34	Richard M. Bishop (1812–1893)	January 14, 1878 – January 12, 1880 (729 days; lost nomination) (Note: Bishop lost the Democratic nomination to Thomas Ewing Jr.)	Democratic	1877	Jabez W. Fitch
35	Charles Foster (1828–1904)	January 12, 1880 – January 14, 1884 (1464 days; retired)	Republican	1879	Andrew Hickenlooper
35	Charles Foster (1828–1904)	January 12, 1880 – January 14, 1884 (1464 days; retired)	Republican	1881	Rees G. Richards
36	George Hoadly (1826–1902)	January 14, 1884 – January 11, 1886 (729 days; lost election)	Democratic	1883	John G. Warwick
37	Joseph B. Foraker (1846–1917)	January 11, 1886 – January 13, 1890 (1464 days; lost election)	Republican	1885	Robert P. Kennedy (resigned March 3, 1887)
37	Joseph B. Foraker (1846–1917)	January 11, 1886 – January 13, 1890 (1464 days; lost election)	Republican	1885	Silas A. Conrad
37	Joseph B. Foraker (1846–1917)	January 11, 1886 – January 13, 1890 (1464 days; lost election)	Republican	1887	William C. Lyon
38	James E. Campbell (1843–1924)	January 13, 1890 – January 11, 1892 (729 days; lost election)	Democratic	1889	Elbert L. Lampson (replaced January 31, 1890)
38	James E. Campbell (1843–1924)	January 13, 1890 – January 11, 1892 (729 days; lost election)	Democratic	1889	William V. Marquis
39	William McKinley (1843–1901)	January 11, 1892 – January 13, 1896 (1464 days; retired)	Republican	1891	Andrew L. Harris
39	William McKinley (1843–1901)	January 11, 1892 – January 13, 1896 (1464 days; retired)	Republican	1893	Andrew L. Harris
40	Asa S. Bushnell (1834–1904)	January 13, 1896 – January 8, 1900 (1457 days; retired)	Republican	1895	Asa W. Jones
40	Asa S. Bushnell (1834–1904)	January 13, 1896 – January 8, 1900 (1457 days; retired)	Republican	1897	Asa W. Jones
41	George K. Nash (1842–1904)	January 8, 1900 – January 11, 1904 (1464 days; retired)	Republican	1899	John A. Caldwell
41	George K. Nash (1842–1904)	January 8, 1900 – January 11, 1904 (1464 days; retired)	Republican	1901	Carl L. Nippert (resigned May 1, 1902)
41	George K. Nash (1842–1904)	January 8, 1900 – January 11, 1904 (1464 days; retired)	Republican	1901	Harry L. Gordon
42	Myron T. Herrick (1854–1929)	January 11, 1904 – January 8, 1906 (729 days; lost election)	Republican	1903	Warren G. Harding
43	John M. Pattison (1847–1906)	January 8, 1906 – June 18, 1906 (162 days; died in office)	Democratic	1905	Andrew L. Harris
44	Andrew L. Harris (1835–1915)	June 18, 1906 – January 11, 1909 (939 days; lost election)	Republican	Succeeded from lieutenant governor	Vacant
45	Judson Harmon (1846–1927)	January 11, 1909 – January 13, 1913 (1464 days; retired) (Note: Harmon instead ran unsuccessfully for the Democratic nomination for President of the United States.)	Democratic	1908	Francis W. Treadway
45	Judson Harmon (1846–1927)	January 11, 1909 – January 13, 1913 (1464 days; retired)	Democratic	1910	Atlee Pomerene (resigned March 4, 1911)
45	Judson Harmon (1846–1927)	January 11, 1909 – January 13, 1913 (1464 days; retired)	Democratic	1910	Hugh L. Nichols
46	James M. Cox (1870–1957)	January 13, 1913 – January 11, 1915 (729 days; lost election)	Democratic	1912	W. A. Greenlund
47	Frank B. Willis (1871–1928)	January 11, 1915 – January 8, 1917 (729 days; lost election)	Republican	1914	John H. Arnold
48	James M. Cox (1870–1957)	January 8, 1917 – January 10, 1921 (1464 days; retired) (Note: Cox instead ran unsuccessfully for President of the United States.)	Democratic	1916	Earl D. Bloom
48	James M. Cox (1870–1957)	January 8, 1917 – January 10, 1921 (1464 days; retired)	Democratic	1918	Clarence J. Brown
49	Harry L. Davis (1878–1950)	January 10, 1921 – January 8, 1923 (729 days; retired)	Republican	1920	Clarence J. Brown
50	Vic Donahey (1873–1946)	January 8, 1923 – January 14, 1929 (2199 days; retired)	Democratic	1922	Earl D. Bloom
50	Vic Donahey (1873–1946)	January 8, 1923 – January 14, 1929 (2199 days; retired)	Democratic	1924	Charles H. Lewis
50	Vic Donahey (1873–1946)	January 8, 1923 – January 14, 1929 (2199 days; retired)	Democratic	1926	Earl D. Bloom (resigned April 1928)
50	Vic Donahey (1873–1946)	January 8, 1923 – January 14, 1929 (2199 days; retired)	Democratic	1926	William G. Pickrel (term ended November 1928)
50	Vic Donahey (1873–1946)	January 8, 1923 – January 14, 1929 (2199 days; retired)	Democratic	1926	George C. Braden
51	Myers Y. Cooper (1873–1958)	January 14, 1929 – January 12, 1931 (729 days; lost election)	Republican	1928	John T. Brown
52	George White (1872–1953)	January 12, 1931 – January 14, 1935 (1464 days; retired) (Note: White instead ran unsuccessfully for the Democratic nomination for the United States Senate.)	Democratic	1930	William G. Pickrel
52	George White (1872–1953)	January 12, 1931 – January 14, 1935 (1464 days; retired)	Democratic	1932	Charles W. Sawyer
53	Martin L. Davey (1884–1946)	January 14, 1935 – January 9, 1939 (1457 days; lost nomination) (Note: Davey lost the Democratic nomination to Charles W. Sawyer.)	Democratic	1934	Harold G. Mosier
53	Martin L. Davey (1884–1946)	January 14, 1935 – January 9, 1939 (1457 days; lost nomination)	Democratic	1936	Paul P. Yoder
54	John W. Bricker (1893–1986)	January 9, 1939 – January 8, 1945 (2192 days; retired) (Note: Bricker instead ran unsuccessfully for Vice President of the United States.)	Republican	1938	Paul M. Herbert
54	John W. Bricker (1893–1986)	January 9, 1939 – January 8, 1945 (2192 days; retired)	Republican	1940	Paul M. Herbert
54	John W. Bricker (1893–1986)	January 9, 1939 – January 8, 1945 (2192 days; retired)	Republican	1942	Paul M. Herbert
55	Frank Lausche (1895–1990)	January 8, 1945 – January 13, 1947 (736 days; lost election)	Democratic	1944	George D. Nye
56	Thomas J. Herbert (1894–1974)	January 13, 1947 – January 10, 1949 (729 days; lost election)	Republican	1946	Paul M. Herbert
57	Frank Lausche (1895–1990)	January 10, 1949 – January 3, 1957 (2916 days; resigned) (Note: Lausche resigned, having been elected to the United States Senate.)	Democratic	1948	George D. Nye
57	Frank Lausche (1895–1990)	January 10, 1949 – January 3, 1957 (2916 days; resigned)	Democratic	1950	George D. Nye
57	Frank Lausche (1895–1990)	January 10, 1949 – January 3, 1957 (2916 days; resigned)	Democratic	1952	John William Brown
57	Frank Lausche (1895–1990)	January 10, 1949 – January 3, 1957 (2916 days; resigned)	Democratic	1954	John William Brown
58	John William Brown (1913–1993)	January 3, 1957 – January 14, 1957 (12 days; retired) (Note: Brown had already lost the Republican nomination when he succeeded Lausche.)	Republican	Succeeded from lieutenant governor	Vacant
59	C. William O'Neill (1916–1978)	January 14, 1957 – January 12, 1959 (729 days; lost election)	Republican	1956	Paul M. Herbert
60	Michael DiSalle (1908–1981)	January 12, 1959 – January 14, 1963 (1464 days; lost election)	Democratic	1958	John W. Donahey
61	Jim Rhodes (1909–2001)	January 14, 1963 – January 11, 1971 (2920 days; term-limited) (Note: Rhodes, being term-limited, (Note: Under a 1957 amendment to the constitution, governors are ineligible to hold the office longer than two successive terms.) had already lost the Republican nomination for the United States Senate when his term ended.)	Republican	1962	John William Brown
61	Jim Rhodes (1909–2001)	January 14, 1963 – January 11, 1971 (2920 days; term-limited)	Republican	1966	John William Brown
62	John J. Gilligan (1921–2013)	January 11, 1971 – January 13, 1975 (1464 days; lost election)	Democratic	1970	John William Brown
63	Jim Rhodes (1909–2001)	January 13, 1975 – January 10, 1983 (2920 days; term-limited)	Republican	1974	Dick Celeste (Note: Represented the Democratic Party)
63	Jim Rhodes (1909–2001)	January 13, 1975 – January 10, 1983 (2920 days; term-limited)	Republican	1978	George Voinovich (resigned November 1979)
63	Jim Rhodes (1909–2001)	January 13, 1975 – January 10, 1983 (2920 days; term-limited)	Republican	1978	Vacant
64	Dick Celeste (b. 1937)	January 10, 1983 – January 14, 1991 (2927 days; term-limited)	Democratic	1982	Myrl Shoemaker (died July 30, 1985)
64	Dick Celeste (b. 1937)	January 10, 1983 – January 14, 1991 (2927 days; term-limited)	Democratic	1982	Vacant
64	Dick Celeste (b. 1937)	January 10, 1983 – January 14, 1991 (2927 days; term-limited)	Democratic	1986	Paul Leonard
65	George Voinovich (1936–2016)	January 14, 1991 – December 31, 1998 (2909 days; resigned) (Note: Voinovich resigned, having been elected to the United States Senate.)	Republican	1990	Mike DeWine (resigned November 12, 1994)
65	George Voinovich (1936–2016)	January 14, 1991 – December 31, 1998 (2909 days; resigned)	Republican	1990	Vacant
65	George Voinovich (1936–2016)	January 14, 1991 – December 31, 1998 (2909 days; resigned)	Republican	1994	Nancy Hollister
66	Nancy Hollister (b. 1949)	December 31, 1998 – January 11, 1999 (12 days; retired)	Republican	Succeeded from lieutenant governor	Vacant
67	Bob Taft (b. 1942)	January 11, 1999 – January 8, 2007 (2920 days; term-limited)	Republican	1998	Maureen O'Connor (resigned December 31, 2002)
67	Bob Taft (b. 1942)	January 11, 1999 – January 8, 2007 (2920 days; term-limited)	Republican	1998	Vacant
67	Bob Taft (b. 1942)	January 11, 1999 – January 8, 2007 (2920 days; term-limited)	Republican	2002	Jennette Bradley (resigned January 5, 2005)
67	Bob Taft (b. 1942)	January 11, 1999 – January 8, 2007 (2920 days; term-limited)	Republican	2002	Bruce Johnson (resigned December 8, 2006)
67	Bob Taft (b. 1942)	January 11, 1999 – January 8, 2007 (2920 days; term-limited)	Republican	2002	Vacant
68	Ted Strickland (b. 1941)	January 8, 2007 – January 10, 2011 (1464 days; lost election)	Democratic	2006	Lee Fisher
69	John Kasich (b. 1952)	January 10, 2011 – January 14, 2019 (2927 days; term-limited)	Republican	2010	Mary Taylor
69	John Kasich (b. 1952)	January 10, 2011 – January 14, 2019 (2927 days; term-limited)	Republican	2014	Mary Taylor
70	Mike DeWine (b. 1947)	January 14, 2019 – Incumbent (Note: DeWine's second term began on January 8, 2023, and will expire on January 11, 2027; he is term-limited.) (in office 2870 days)	Republican	2018	Jon Husted (resigned January 21, 2025)
70	Mike DeWine (b. 1947)	January 14, 2019 – Incumbent (in office 2870 days)	Republican	2022	Jon Husted (resigned January 21, 2025)
70	Mike DeWine (b. 1947)	January 14, 2019 – Incumbent (in office 2870 days)	Republican	2022	Vacant
70	Mike DeWine (b. 1947)	January 14, 2019 – Incumbent (in office 2870 days)	Republican	2022	Jim Tressel (appointed February 14, 2025)
71	Amy Acton (b. 1966)	Governor-elect takes office January 11, 2027	Democratic	2026	David Pepper

== See also ==
- Gubernatorial lines of succession in the United States § Ohio
- Lieutenant Governor of Ohio
- List of Ohio state legislatures

== Sources ==
- "Former Ohio Governors". National Governors Association.
- "Ohio Constitution". State Democracy Research Initiative. University of Wisconsin Law School.
- Dubin, Michael J. (2003). United States Gubernatorial Elections, 1776–1860: The Official Results by State and County. McFarland. ISBN 0-7864-1439-1 – via Internet Archive.
- Glashan, Roy R. (1979). American Governors and Gubernatorial Elections, 1775-1978. Meckler Books. ISBN 0-7201-1511-6 – via Internet Archive.
- Kallenbach, Joseph E.; Kallenbach, Jessamine S. (1977). American State Governors, 1776-1976. Oceana Publications. ISBN 978-0-379-00665-0 – via Internet Archive.
- McMullin, Thomas A.; Walker, David (1984). Biographical Directory of American Territorial Governors. Meckler Publishing. ISBN 0-930466-11-X – via Internet Archive.
- Mullaney, Marie Marmo (1994). Biographical Directory of the Governors of the United States, 1988–1994. Greenwood Publishing Group. ISBN 0-313-28312-5 – via Internet Archive.
- Sobel, Robert; Raimo, John (1978). Biographical Directory of the Governors of the United States, 1789-1978. Vol. 3. Meckler Books. ISBN 0-930466-01-2 – via Internet Archive.
- Thorpe, Francis Newton, ed. (1909). The Federal and State Constitutions, Colonial Charters, and Other Organic Laws of the States, Territories, and Colonies Now or Heretofore Forming the United States of America. Vol. 5. United States Government Publishing Office – via Internet Archive.
