= 1807 Ohio gubernatorial election =

- October 13, 1807
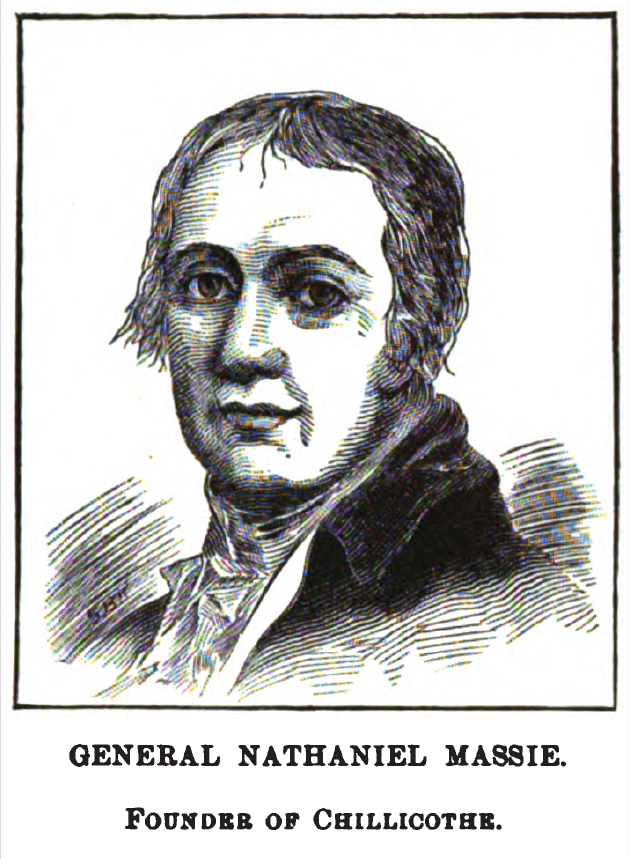

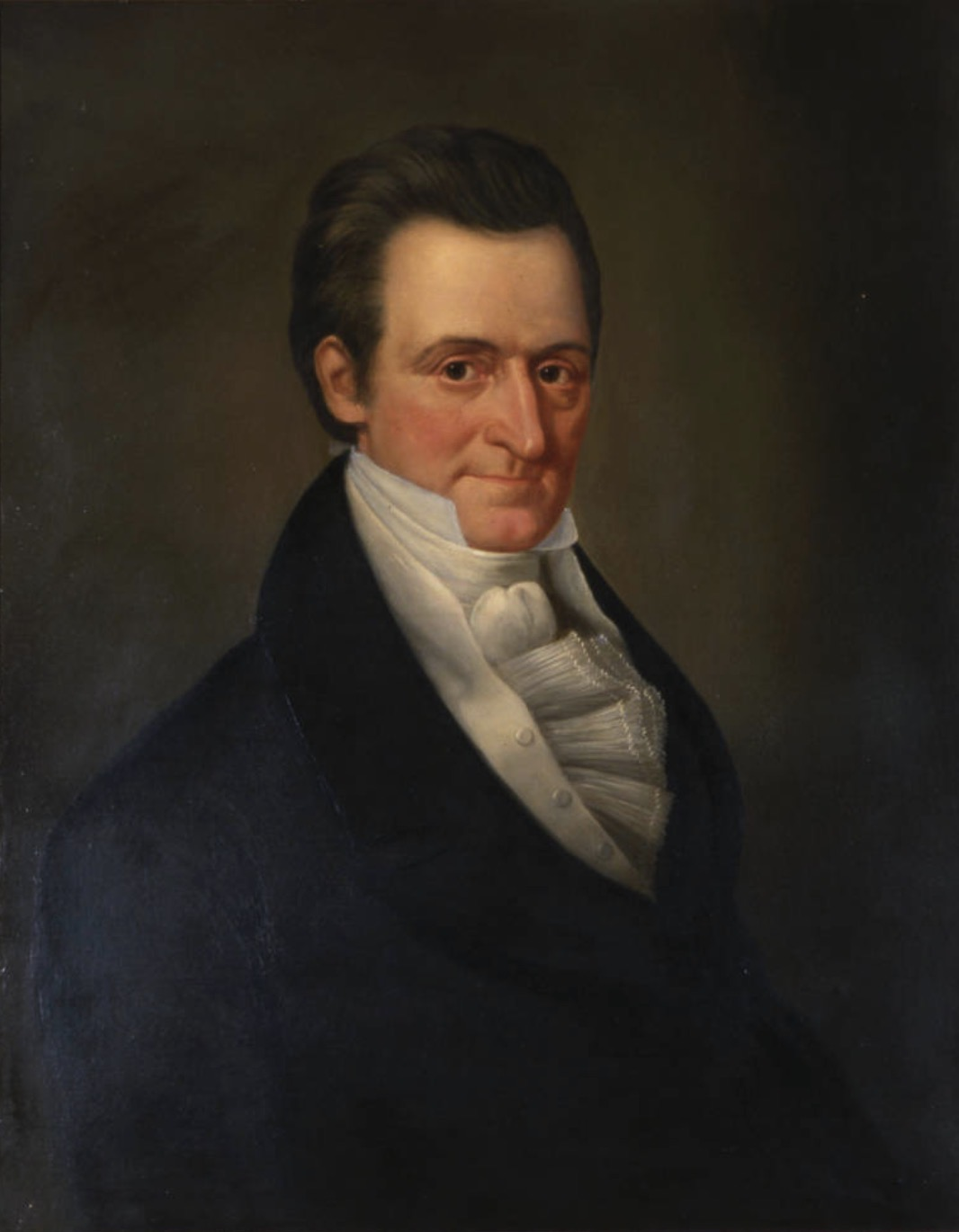
Nominee	Nathaniel Massie (declined)	Return J. Meigs Jr. (disqualified)
Party	Democratic-Republican	Democratic-Republican
Popular vote	4,833	5,525
Percentage	46.49%	53.15%
- Election results by county Massie: 50–60% 60–70% 70–80% 80–90% 90–100% Meigs: 50–60% 60–70% 70–80% 80–90% 90–100% No Data/Vote
Governor before election
Thomas Kirker (Acting)
Democratic-Republican
Elected Governor
Thomas Kirker (Acting)
Democratic-Republican

The 1807 Ohio gubernatorial election was held on October 13, 1807, in order to elect the Governor of Ohio. Democratic-Republican candidate and former Chief Justice of the Ohio Supreme Court Return J. Meigs Jr. initially won the election against fellow Democratic-Republican candidates Nathaniel Massie and Thomas Worthington. However, it was determined by the Ohio State Legislature that Meigs did not meet the residency requirements in order to take office as Governor of Ohio. The Ohio State Legislature thereby declared Massie the winner of the election, but he refused to accept the position of Governor. Therefor incumbent Democratic-Republican Acting Governor Thomas Kirker remained Governor until the next election.

== General election ==
On election day, October 13, 1807, Democratic-Republican candidate Return J. Meigs Jr. won the election by a margin of 692 votes against his foremost opponent fellow Democratic-Republican candidate Nathaniel Massie, thereby retaining Democratic-Republican control over the office of Governor. Meigs was however disqualified by the Ohio State Legislature to serve as Governor and Massie refused the position after the Legislature offered it to him. Therefor incumbent Democratic-Republican Acting Governor Thomas Kirker was sworn in for this term on December 13, 1807.

=== Results ===
Ohio gubernatorial election, 1807
Party	Candidate	Votes	%
Democratic-Republican	Nathaniel Massie	4,833	46.49%
Democratic-Republican	Return J. Meigs Jr. (disqualified)	5,525	53.15%
Democratic-Republican	Thomas Worthington	35	0.34%
	Scattering	3	0.02%
Total votes		10,396	100.00%
Democratic-Republican hold			
