= 1810 Ohio gubernatorial election =

- October 9, 1810
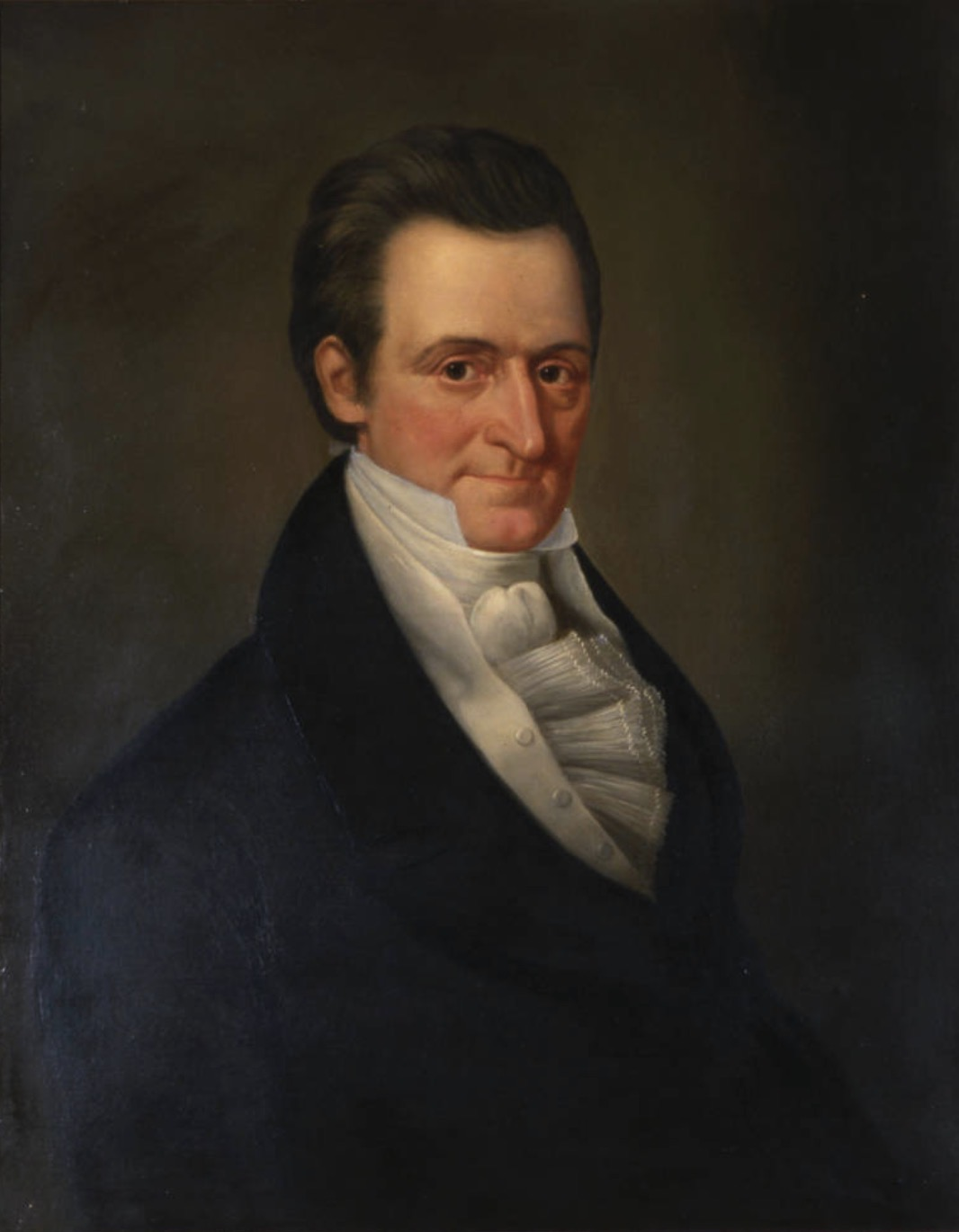

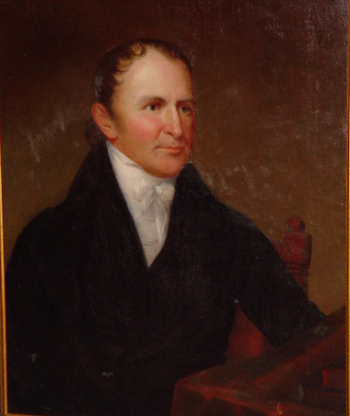
Nominee	Return J. Meigs Jr.	Thomas Worthington
Party	Democratic-Republican	Democratic-Republican
Popular vote	9,924	7,731
Percentage	56.21%	43.79%
- Election results by county Meigs: 50–60% 60–70% 70–80% 80–90% 90–100% Wortington: 50–60% 60–70% 70–80% 80–90% 90–100% No Data/Vote
Governor before election
Samuel Huntington
Democratic-Republican
Elected Governor
Return J. Meigs Jr.
Democratic-Republican

The 1810 Ohio gubernatorial election was held on October 9, 1810, in order to elect the Governor of Ohio. Democratic-Republican candidate and incumbent United States Senator Return J. Meigs Jr. defeated fellow Democratic-Republican candidate and former United States Senator Thomas Worthington.

== General election ==
On election day, October 9, 1810, Democratic-Republican candidate Return J. Meigs Jr. won the election by a margin of 2,193 votes against his opponent fellow Democratic-Republican candidate Thomas Worthington, thereby retaining Democratic-Republican control over the office of Governor. Meigs was sworn in as the 4th Governor of Ohio on December 8, 1810.

=== Results ===
Ohio gubernatorial election, 1810
Party	Candidate	Votes	%
Democratic-Republican	Return J. Meigs Jr.	9,924	56.21%
Democratic-Republican	Thomas Worthington	7,731	43.79%
Total votes		17,655	100.00%
Democratic-Republican hold			
