= 1814 Ohio gubernatorial election =

- October 11, 1814
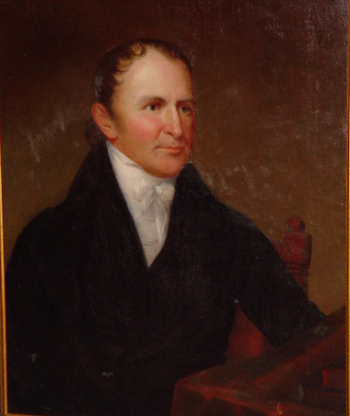

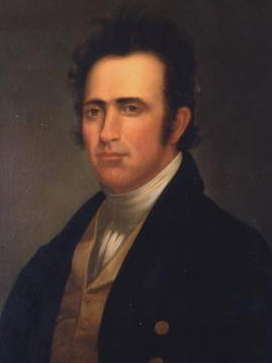
Nominee	Thomas Worthington	Othniel Looker
Party	Democratic-Republican	Democratic-Republican
Popular vote	17,579	6,171
Percentage	73.83%	25.92%
- Election results by county Worthington: 50–60% 60–70% 70–80% 80–90% 90–100% Looker: 50–60% 60–70% 70–80% No Data/Vote
Governor before election
Othniel Looker (Acting)
Democratic-Republican
Elected Governor
Return J. Meigs Jr.
Democratic-Republican

The 1814 Ohio gubernatorial election was held on October 11, 1814, in order to elect the Governor of Ohio. Democratic-Republican candidate and incumbent United States Senator Thomas Worthington defeated incumbent Democratic-Republican Acting Governor Othniel Looker and Democratic-Republican candidate William Craig.

== General election ==
On election day, October 11, 1814, Democratic-Republican candidate Thomas Worthington won the election by a margin of 11,408 votes against his foremost opponent incumbent Democratic-Republican Acting Governor Othniel Looker, thereby retaining Democratic-Republican control over the office of Governor. Worthington was sworn in as the 6th Governor of Ohio on December 8, 1814.

=== Results ===
Ohio gubernatorial election, 1814
Party	Candidate	Votes	%
Democratic-Republican	Thomas Worthington	17,579	73.83%
Democratic-Republican	Othniel Looker (incumbent)	6,171	25.92%
Democratic-Republican	William Craig	59	0.25%
Total votes		23,809	100.00%
Democratic-Republican hold			
