= 1816 Ohio gubernatorial election =

- October 8, 1816
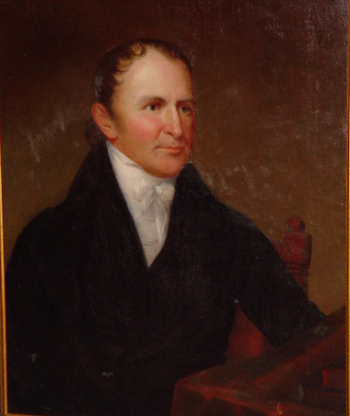

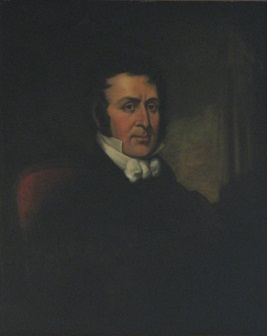
Nominee	Thomas Worthington	James Dunlap	Ethan Allen Brown
Party	Democratic-Republican	Democratic-Republican	Democratic-Republican
Popular vote	22,931	6,295	1,607
Percentage	74.35%	20.41%	5.21%
- Election results by county Worthington: 50–60% 60–70% 70–80% 80–90% 90–100% Dunlap: 50–60% 60–70% 70–80% 80–90% Brown: 50–60% 60–70% 70–80% No Data/Vote
Governor before election
Thomas Worthington
Democratic-Republican
Elected Governor
Thomas Worthington
Democratic-Republican

The 1816 Ohio gubernatorial election was held on October 8, 1816, in order to elect the Governor of Ohio. Incumbent Democratic-Republican Governor of Ohio Thomas Worthington defeated fellow Democratic-Republican members James Dunlap and Ethan Allen Brown.

== General election ==
On election day, October 8, 1816, Democratic-Republican nominee Thomas Worthington won re-election by a margin of 16,636 votes against his opponents and fellow Democratic-Republican members James Dunlap and Ethan Allen Brown, thereby retaining Democratic-Republican control over the office of Governor. Worthington was sworn in for his second term on December 9, 1816.

=== Results ===
Ohio gubernatorial election, 1816
Party	Candidate	Votes	%
Democratic-Republican	Thomas Worthington (incumbent)	22,931	74.35
Democratic-Republican	James Dunlap	6,295	20.41
Democratic-Republican	Ethan Allen Brown	1,607	5.21
	Others	9	0.03
Total votes		29,842	100.00
Democratic-Republican hold			
