= Stanley Griswold =

American politician, lawyer and judge (1763–1815)

United States Senator from Ohio
- In office May 18, 1809 – December 11, 1809
- Appointed by: Samuel Huntington
- Preceded by: Edward Tiffin
- Succeeded by: Alexander Campbell

Personal details
- Born: November 14, 1763 Torrington, Connecticut
- Died: August 21, 1815 (aged 51) Shawneetown, Illinois, U.S.
- Party: Democratic-Republican

Stanley Griswold (November 14, 1763 – August 21, 1815) was a Democratic-Republican politician from Ohio. He served in the U.S. Senate.

Born in Torrington, Connecticut, Griswold served in the militia during the Revolutionary War. After graduating from Yale College in 1786, he taught for a time in Norwich, and began studying Theology in 1787. In 1789 he was called to the First Congregational Church in New Milford, Connecticut, where he preached until 1802. In 1803 he went to Walpole, New Hampshire, as editor of the new Democratic newspaper The Political Observatory. Griswold continued with the paper until the spring of 1805 when he received the appointment of Secretary to the new Territory of Michigan from President Thomas Jefferson. He served as the first territorial secretary of Michigan Territory from 1805-1808. In 1806, while serving as acting governor in the absence of Governor William Hull, Griswold ordered the erection of Fort Croghan, also known as Fort Nonsense, to protect livestock from raids by Native Americans. Griswold Street in Detroit is named in his honor. His tenure ended largely due to disagreements with the Governor, who accused Griswold of causing dissension between the Governor and the militia. In January 1808, Griswold lost a trial, which has been characterized as a farce, and was obliged to pay a penalty of $1,000. He left office on March 18, 1808, and moved to Ohio. He was appointed to the Senate to fill the vacancy created by the resignation of Edward Tiffin, serving from May 18, 1809 until a special election was held to choose a successor on December 11, 1809. Griswold then moved to the Illinois Territory, where he was appointed as a federal judge, serving on the bench and as a lawyer until his death.

== Notes ==
Political offices
New title	Secretary of Michigan Territory; March 1, 1805 – March 18, 1808	Succeeded by Reuben Atwater
U.S. Senate
Preceded by Edward Tiffin	U.S. senator (Class 3) from Ohio; May 18, 1809 – December 11, 1809; Served alongside: Return J. Meigs, Jr.	Succeeded by Alexander Campbell
