= 1808 Ohio gubernatorial election =

- October 11, 1808
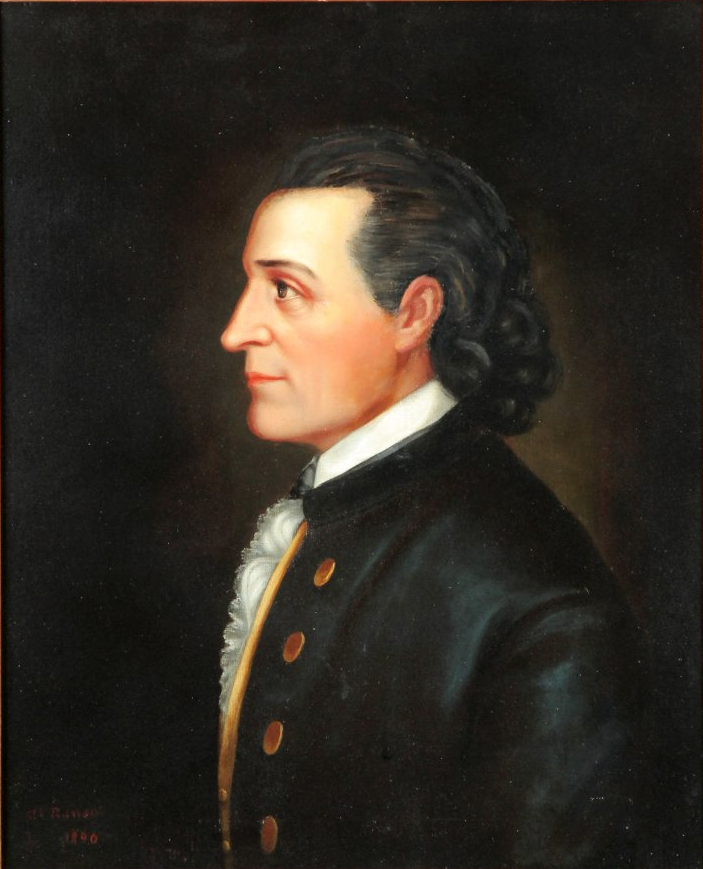

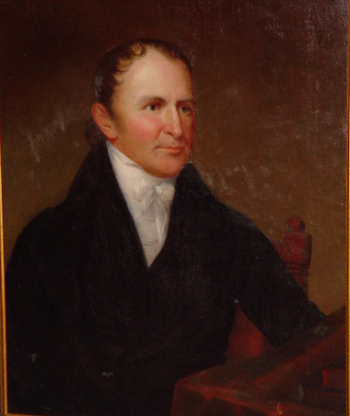

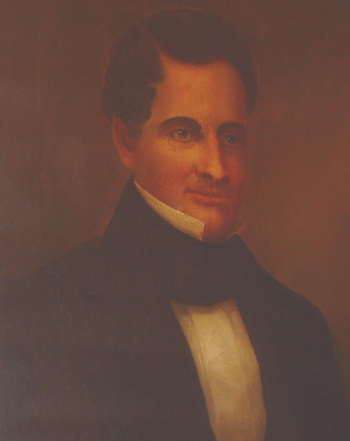
Nominee	Samuel Huntington	Thomas Worthington	Thomas Kirker
Party	Democratic-Republican	Democratic-Republican	Democratic-Republican
Popular vote	7,293	5,601	3,397
Percentage	44.77%	34.38%	20.85%
- Election results by county Huntington: 40–50% 50–60% 60–70% 70–80% 80–90% 90–100% Worthington: 50–60% 60–70% 70–80% Kirker: 50–60% 60–70% 70–80% Unknown/no votes
Governor before election
Thomas Kirker (Acting)
Democratic-Republican
Elected Governor
Samuel Huntington
Democratic-Republican

The 1808 Ohio gubernatorial election was held on October 11, 1808, in order to elect the Governor of Ohio. Democratic-Republican candidate and former Justice of the Ohio Supreme Court Samuel Huntington defeated fellow Democratic-Republican candidate and former United States Senator Thomas Worthington and incumbent Democratic-Republican Acting Governor Thomas Kirker.

== General election ==
On election day, October 11, 1808, Democratic-Republican candidate Samuel Huntington won the election by a margin of 1,692 votes against his foremost opponent fellow Democratic-Republican candidate Thomas Worthington, thereby retaining Democratic-Republican control over the office of Governor. Huntington was sworn in as the 3rd Governor of Ohio on December 12, 1808.

=== Results ===
Ohio gubernatorial election, 1808
Party	Candidate	Votes	%
Democratic-Republican	Samuel Huntington	7,293	44.77%
Democratic-Republican	Thomas Worthington	5,601	34.38%
Democratic-Republican	Thomas Kirker (incumbent)	3,397	20.85%
Total votes		16,291	100.00%
Democratic-Republican hold			
