= 1805 Ohio gubernatorial election =

- October 8, 1805
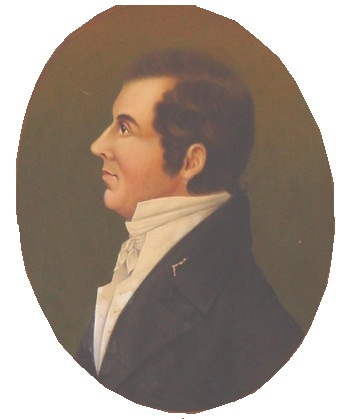

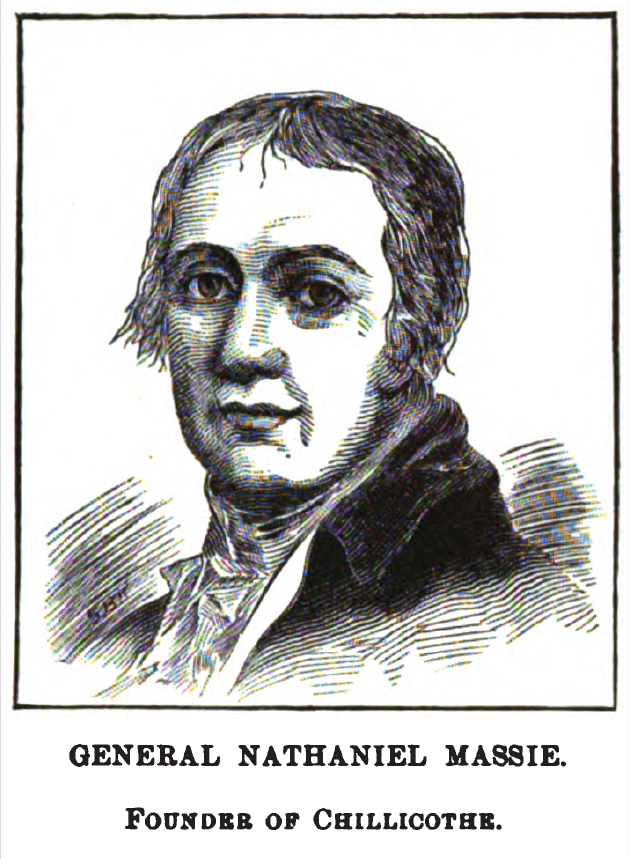
Nominee	Edward Tiffin	Nathaniel Massie
Party	Democratic-Republican	Democratic-Republican
Popular vote	5,473	168
Percentage	96.70%	2.97%
- County results Tiffin: 90–100% No data/vote
Governor before election
Edward Tiffin
Democratic-Republican
Elected Governor
Edward Tiffin
Democratic-Republican

The 1805 Ohio gubernatorial election was held on October 8, 1805, to elect the governor of Ohio. Incumbent Democratic-Republican governor Edward Tiffin won re-election against fellow Democratic-Republican candidate Nathaniel Massie and Federalist nominee Benjamin I. Gilman.

== General election ==
On election day, October 8, 1805, incumbent Democratic-Republican governor Edward Tiffin won re-election by a margin of 5,305 votes against his foremost opponent, fellow Democratic-Republican candidate Nathaniel Massie, thereby retaining Democratic-Republican control over the office of governor. Tiffin was sworn in for his second term on December 2, 1805.

=== Results ===
Ohio gubernatorial election, 1805
Party	Candidate	Votes	%
Democratic-Republican	Edward Tiffin (incumbent)	5,473	96.70%
Democratic-Republican	Nathaniel Massie	168	2.97%
Federalist	Benjamin I. Gilman	16	0.28%
	Scattering	3	0.05%
Total votes		5,660	100.00%
Democratic-Republican hold			
