= 1812 Ohio gubernatorial election =

- October 13, 1812
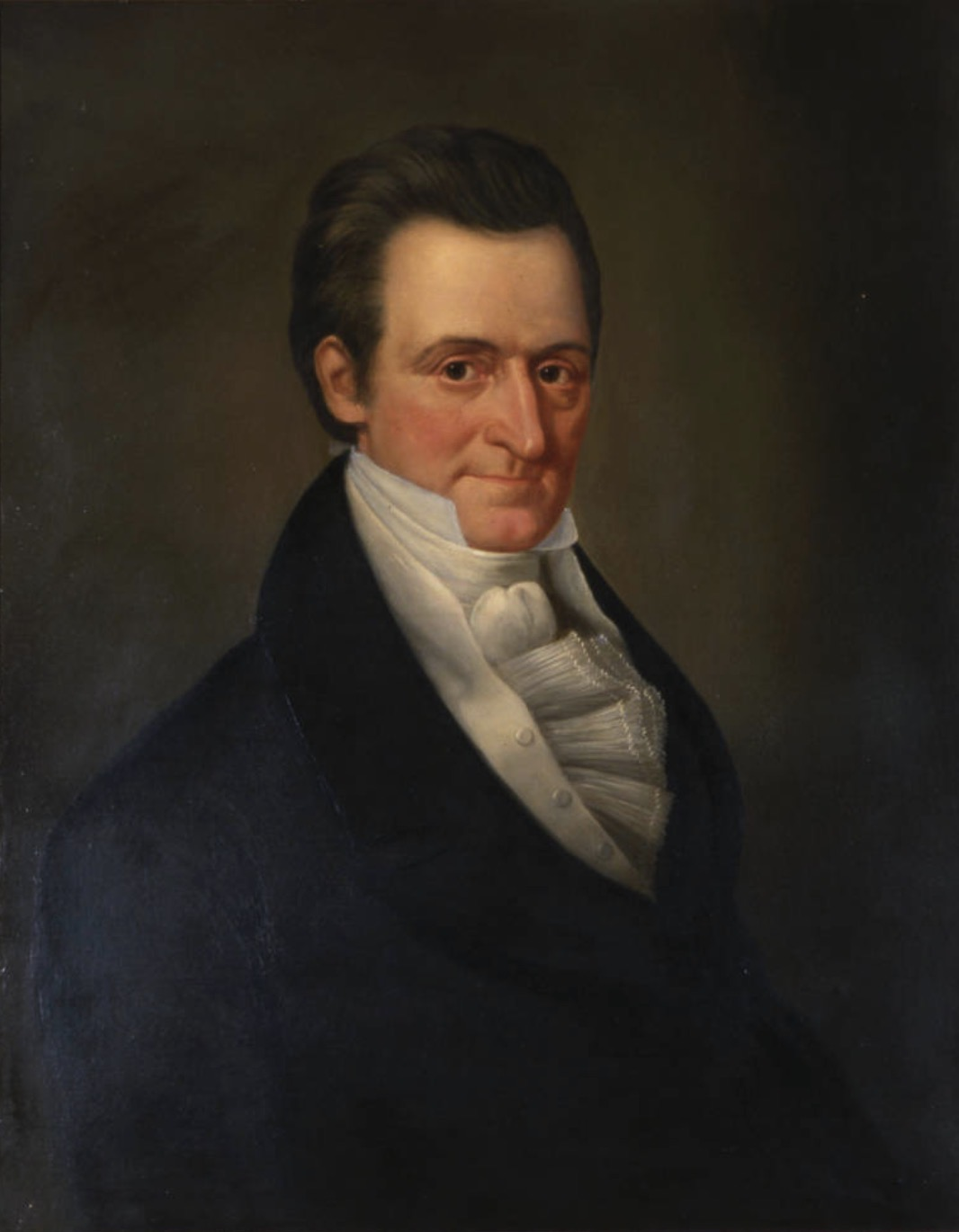

Nominee	Return J. Meigs Jr.	Thomas Scott
Party	Democratic-Republican	Federalist
Popular vote	11,859	7,903
Percentage	60.01%	39.99%
- Election results by county Meigs: 50–60% 60–70% 70–80% 90–100% Scott: 50–60% 60–70% 70–80% 80–90% 90–100% No Data/Vote
Governor before election
Return J. Meigs Jr.
Democratic-Republican
Elected Governor
Return J. Meigs Jr.
Democratic-Republican

The 1812 Ohio gubernatorial election was held on October 13, 1812, in order to elect the governor of Ohio. Incumbent Democratic-Republican governor Return J. Meigs Jr. won re-election against Federalist nominee Thomas Scott.

== General election ==
On election day, October 13, 1812, incumbent Democratic-Republican governor Return J. Meigs Jr. won re-election by a margin of 3,956 votes against his opponent Federalist nominee Thomas Scott, thereby retaining Democratic-Republican control over the office of governor. Meigs was sworn in for his second term on December 15, 1812.

=== Results ===
Ohio gubernatorial election, 1812
Party	Candidate	Votes	%
Democratic-Republican	Return J. Meigs Jr. (incumbent)	11,859	60.01%
Federalist	Thomas Scott	7,903	39.99%
Total votes		19,762	100.00%
Democratic-Republican hold			
