= Jane T. Worthington =

American essayist, poet (1821–1847)

Jane T. Worthington (1821–1847) was a 19th-century American short story writer, essayist, and poet from Norfolk, Virginia, associated with Southern U.S. literature. Descended from a Virginian family, she began writing at least by the age of fourteen under a pen name. Her writings appeared almost exclusively in the Southern Literary Messenger. Noted for her graceful style, Worthington won a prize of US$100 for her story, "Life and Love" (1844), before her death a few years later in Cincinnati, Ohio at the age of 26.

== Early life and education ==
Jane Tayloe (Note: Sometimes misspelled, "Taylor".) Lomax was born in Norfolk, Virginia, February 2, 1821. She descended from a distinguished family of the State of Virginia. Her parents were Colonel Mann Page Lomax (1787–1842), of the U.S. Army, and Elizabeth Virginia (Lindsay) Lomax (1796–1875). Jane had several younger siblings: Elizabeth, Lunsford, William, Mann, Ann, Mattie, Eleanor, Julia, Mary, and Lunsford.

She was educated in different parts of the country, as the exigencies of the military service led to changes of residence by her father. While her extensive traveling gave her exposure to various parts of society, her love of Virginia remained.

== Career ==
She began writing at least age 14 under a pen name. Nearly all her writings, in prose and verse, appeared in the Southern Literary Messenger, which was edited by a personal friend, at Richmond, Virginia. She excelled most in the essay, with numerous compositions of this kind written in the four or five years of her literary life. Her poems, were characterized as simple, graceful, and earnest.

Her story, "Life and Love", took the prize of US$100 from Dollar Newspaper, a Philadelphia paper, where there were more than 50 competitors.

Worthington's style was characterized as being full of feminine emotion and brilliance, highlighting the beauties of nature and domestic life. Her bright words were said to encourage readers like songbirds.

== Personal life ==
Jane Tayloe Lomax moved to Watertown, Massachusetts, in 1840, and two years later, to Washington D.C. On February 7, 1843, she married physician, Dr. Francis Asbury Worthington (1819–1849), son of Thomas Worthington, Governor of Ohio. Together, they had two children, Elizabeth Lindsey Worthing (who died in childbirth), and Alice S. Worthington (1846-1900). The family resided in Chillicothe, Ohio.

== Death and legacy ==
Jane Worthington died of tuberculosis in Cincinnati, Ohio, May 26, 1847 at the age of 26.

While no collection of her works was published, her fugitive verse continued to be published for more than fifty years after her death.

== Awards ==
- 1844, First prize, Philadelphia Dollar Newspaper, "Life and Love"

== Selected works ==
=== Hymns ===
- "It visiteth the desolate"

=== Poems ===
- "Lines to One Who Will Understand Them"
- "Moonlight on the Grave"
- "Sleep"
- "The Common Bramble"
- "The Child's Grave"
- "The Withered Leaves"
- "The Poor"
- "To the peaks of Otter"
- "To Twilight"
- "The Child's Portrait"
- "A Memory"
- "Madame De Stael"
- "The Stranger's Grave"
- "Korner"
- "Schiller"
- "Corinna's Last Song"

=== Short stories ===
- "Life and Love"
- "Ravenel Hall. A Tale in Two Parts."
- "Love Sketches"
- "The Widowers Bride"
- "The Classmates"
