= John Smith (Ohio politician, died 1824) =

American politician

United States Senator from Ohio
- In office April 1, 1803 – April 25, 1808
- Preceded by: Seat established
- Succeeded by: Return J. Meigs Jr.

Personal details
- Born: c. 1735 Virginia Colony, British America or now Hamilton County, Ohio (then New France)
- Died: July 30, 1824 (aged 88–89) St. Francisville, Louisiana, U.S.
- Party: Democratic-Republican

John Smith (c. 1735 – July 30, 1824) was one of the first two U.S. senators from the state of Ohio. He reluctantly resigned from the Senate under charges of alleged complicity in the Burr conspiracy.

Little is known of his early life. There are conflicting reports on the location of his birth, with some sources saying he was born in the Province of Virginia, and others saying Hamilton County, Ohio (which did not exist until 1790); the identity of his parents are unknown. He prepared for the ministry, and was pastor of the Baptist Church at Columbia, Miami Purchase, Northwest Territory, during the 1790s which some sources credit as the first Baptist Church in modern Ohio. He then began a profitable business supplying military posts near Cincinnati, Ohio. He also ran multiple grain mills. In 1799 Smith along with his agent Reuben Kemper were the first US-based merchants to ship to Baton Rouge, taking nearly $10,000 worth of goods, primarily fine clothing and house furnishings.

He was a member of the Northwest Territorial legislature 1799–1803 and a delegate to the Ohio state constitutional convention in 1802. He was a leader of a group that supported statehood in opposition to the Territorial Governor Arthur St. Clair. Upon the admission of Ohio as a State into the Union, he was elected as a Democratic-Republican to the United States Senate and served in the 8th, 9th and 10th Congresses (1803–1808).

While in the Senate, Smith continued his profitable trading ventures in Louisiana and West Florida and pursued numerous land investment ventures. In 1805, former Vice President Aaron Burr sought his support in organizing a military expedition against Spanish Florida. Although Smith claimed he had no interest in Burr's plot to force secession of Spanish territories, he agreed to provide supplies for the proposed expedition. When President Thomas Jefferson later issued an alert, charging that Burr's actual purpose was an invasion of Mexico, Smith responded patriotically by financing weapons to defend against the Burr expedition and delivering those weapons to New Orleans. These travels caused him to miss weeks of Senate sessions and led the Ohio legislature to charge him with dereliction of duty and to demand his resignation.

Although Smith ignored that demand, he found his troubles increasing as a court in Richmond, Virginia, indicted him in mid-1807 for participating in Burr's conspiracy. As he traveled to Richmond, he learned that the charges against him were dropped after the court acquitted Burr on a technicality.

But on December 31, 1807, a Senate committee chaired by John Quincy Adams recommended that Smith be expelled from the Senate. A trial was held in 1808, with Adams leading the attack. Smith was defended by Francis Scott Key and Robert Goodloe Harper, who argued that Smith may have been naive, but was not a traitor. The expulsion resolution fell one vote short of the required two-thirds majority. Smith resigned on April 25, the last day that Congress was in session for the year.

Smith had enjoyed a close friendship with President Thomas Jefferson early in his Senate career, though that relationship was ruined, along with Smith's political career, by his implication in the Burr treason. Smith was forced into bankruptcy and later moved to St. Francisville, Louisiana, where he served as a Methodist preacher.

The History of Cincinnati and Hamilton County Ohio, published in 1894, indicates that Smith died in Hamilton County, Ohio on June 10, 1816, although this is apparently incorrect, since an obituary and later sources agree on his death in 1824 in St. Francisville, Louisiana.

== See also ==
- List of United States senators expelled or censured

== External links and sources ==
- United States Congress. "John Smith (id: S000567)". Biographical Directory of the United States Congress.
- Online Text of History of Cincinnati and Hamilton County Ohio published 1894
- U.S. Senate web site
- Pitcher, M. Avis. "John Smith, First Senator from Ohio and His Connections with Aaron Burr". Ohio Archaeological and Historical Quarterly. 45: 68–88. Archived from the original on 2004-01-26.
- "Smith, John (Ohio senator)" . Appletons' Cyclopædia of American Biography. 1900.

U.S. Senate
| New seat | U.S. Senator (Class 1) from Ohio; 1803–1808; Served alongside: Thomas Worthington, Edward Tiffin | Succeeded by Return J. Meigs Jr. |
