= 1818 Ohio gubernatorial election =

- October 13, 1818
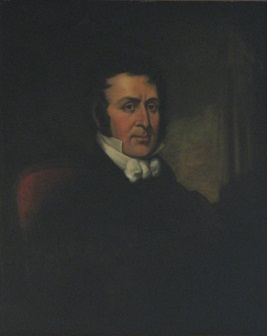

Nominee	Ethan Allen Brown	James Dunlap
Party	Democratic-Republican	Democratic-Republican
Popular vote	30,194	8,075
Percentage	78.90%	21.10%
- Election results by county Brown: 50–60% 60–70% 70–80% 80–90% 90–100% Dunlap: 50–60% 60–70% 70–80% No Data/Vote
Governor before election
Thomas Worthington
Democratic-Republican
Elected Governor
Ethan Allen Brown
Democratic-Republican

The 1818 Ohio gubernatorial election was held on October 13, 1818.

Incumbent Democratic-Republican Governor Thomas Worthington did not run for re-election.

Chief Judge of the Ohio Supreme Court Ethan Allen Brown defeated former member of the Ohio Legislature James Dunlap.

== General election ==
=== Results ===
1818 Ohio gubernatorial election (Note: Glashan gives the result as Brown 31,787, Dunlap 8,807. The result given here is that declared in the Ohio General Assembly.) (Note: Some sources record that there were 24 scattering votes.)
Party	Candidate	Votes	%	±%
Democratic-Republican	Ethan Allen Brown	30,194	78.90%	
Democratic-Republican	James Dunlap	8,075	21.10%	
Majority		22,119	57.80%	
Turnout		38,269		
Democratic-Republican hold		Swing		
