= Othniel Looker House =

Historic house in Ohio, United States

- U.S. National Register of Historic Places
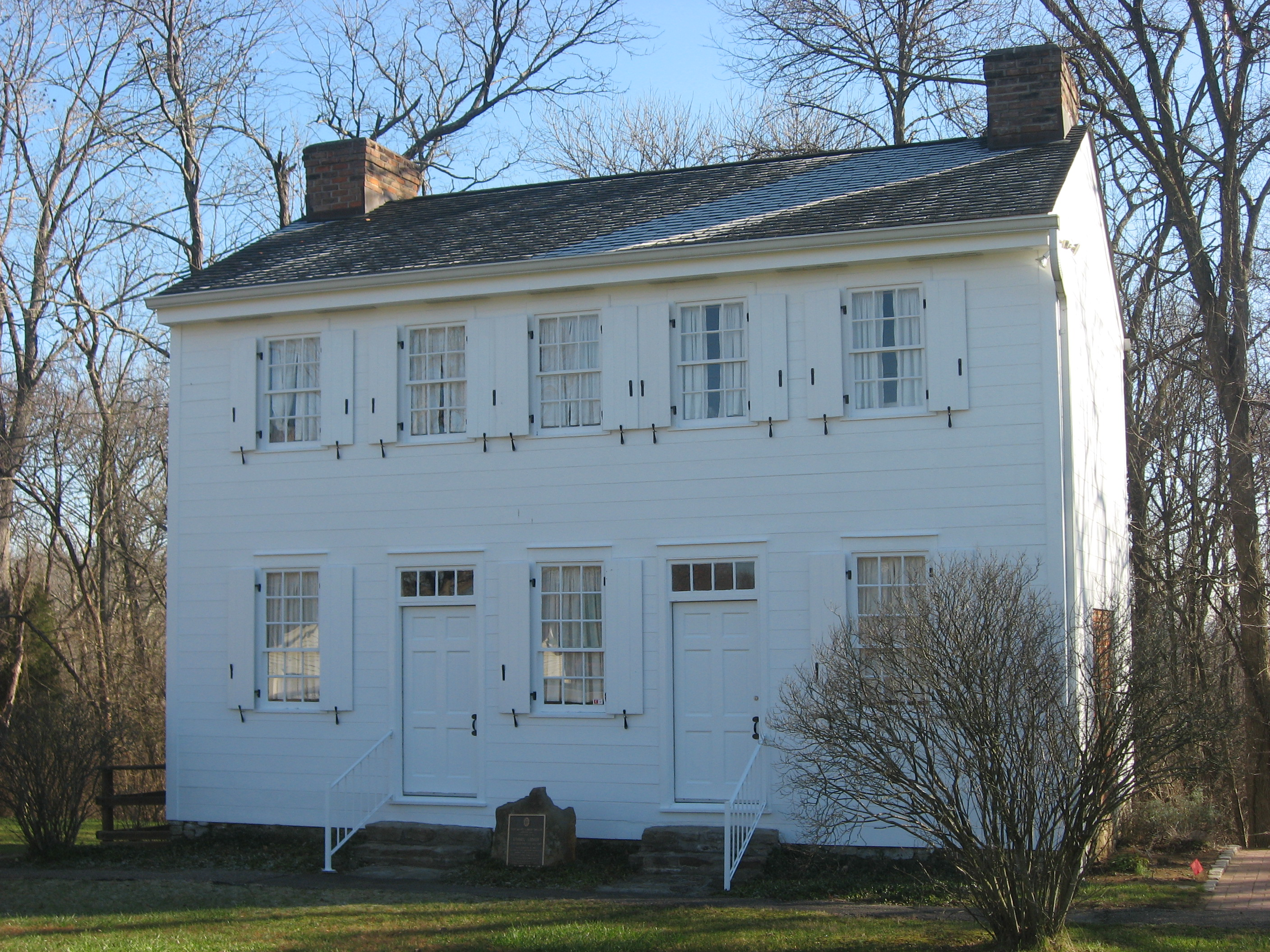
- Front of the house in 2012

- Location within Ohio Location within the United States
- Location: 10580 Marvin Rd., Harrison, Ohio
- Coordinates: 39°16′2″N 84°48′14″W
- Area: less than 1 acre (0.40 ha)
- Built: 1805
- Built by: Othniel Looker
- NRHP reference No.: 75001429
- Added to NRHP: 5 June 1975

Othniel Looker House is a historic house located at 10580 Marvin Road in Harrison, Ohio. Othniel Looker was briefly the fifth Governor of Ohio.

== Description and history ==
Harrison was settled in the early 1800s. Most of those who came were veterans of the Revolutionary War who had received land grants for their service. Among them was Othniel Looker, who bought this property and, with his two eldest sons, cleared the land and erected the wooden house. The remainder of his family then followed. The family lived in the home until the death of Looker's wife.

The house is a two-story, wood-frame building with a shake-gable roof. The main facade is symmetrical, with two doors and three windows alternating. The three central bays are subtly grouped, with the end windows slightly set outward. The second floor has the same five-bay pattern and grouping, with each bay containing a six-over-six, double-hung sash window. The lower story windows follow the same design. The paneled doors are topped by matching four-light transoms. The rear of the building has two batten doors and four windows. The windows are of the same design as those on the front, but the placement is asymmetric and irregular. Both gable ends have interior chimneys. The four-room interior retains original features, including hand-scraped chair rails, baseboards, and molding.

The Looker House, significant as symbol of an important part of Ohio history, is one of the oldest extant structures in the Harrison area. It was originally located in a sout-facing position on Harrison Pike. The building was scheduled for demolition in 1962, but the Village Historical Society had the building completely dismantled, moved to its current location, and reassembled under architectural supervision. The move did not alter the building in any significant way. It was listed on the National Register on June 5, 1975. The Othniel Looker House has been restored to a historically appropriate state, and the society currently operates the facility as a museum.

== See also ==
- History of Ohio
- National Register of Historic Places listings in Hamilton County, Ohio
