= Governor Huntington =

Governor Huntington may refer to:

- Samuel Huntington (Connecticut politician) (1731–1796), 18th Governor of Connecticut
- Samuel Huntington (Ohio politician) (1765–1817), 3rd Governor of Ohio
