= Chillicothe Junto =

Group of Chillicothe, Ohio politicians

The Chillicothe Junto was a term applied to a group of Chillicothe, Ohio Democratic-Republican politicians who brought about the admission of Ohio as a state (1803) and largely controlled its politics for some years thereafter. The best known were Thomas Worthington, Edward Tiffin and Nathaniel Massie.
