= 1820 Ohio gubernatorial election =

- October 10, 1820
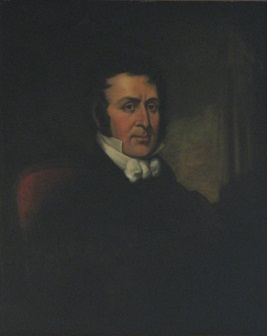

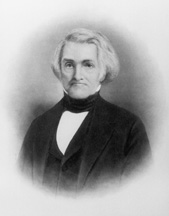

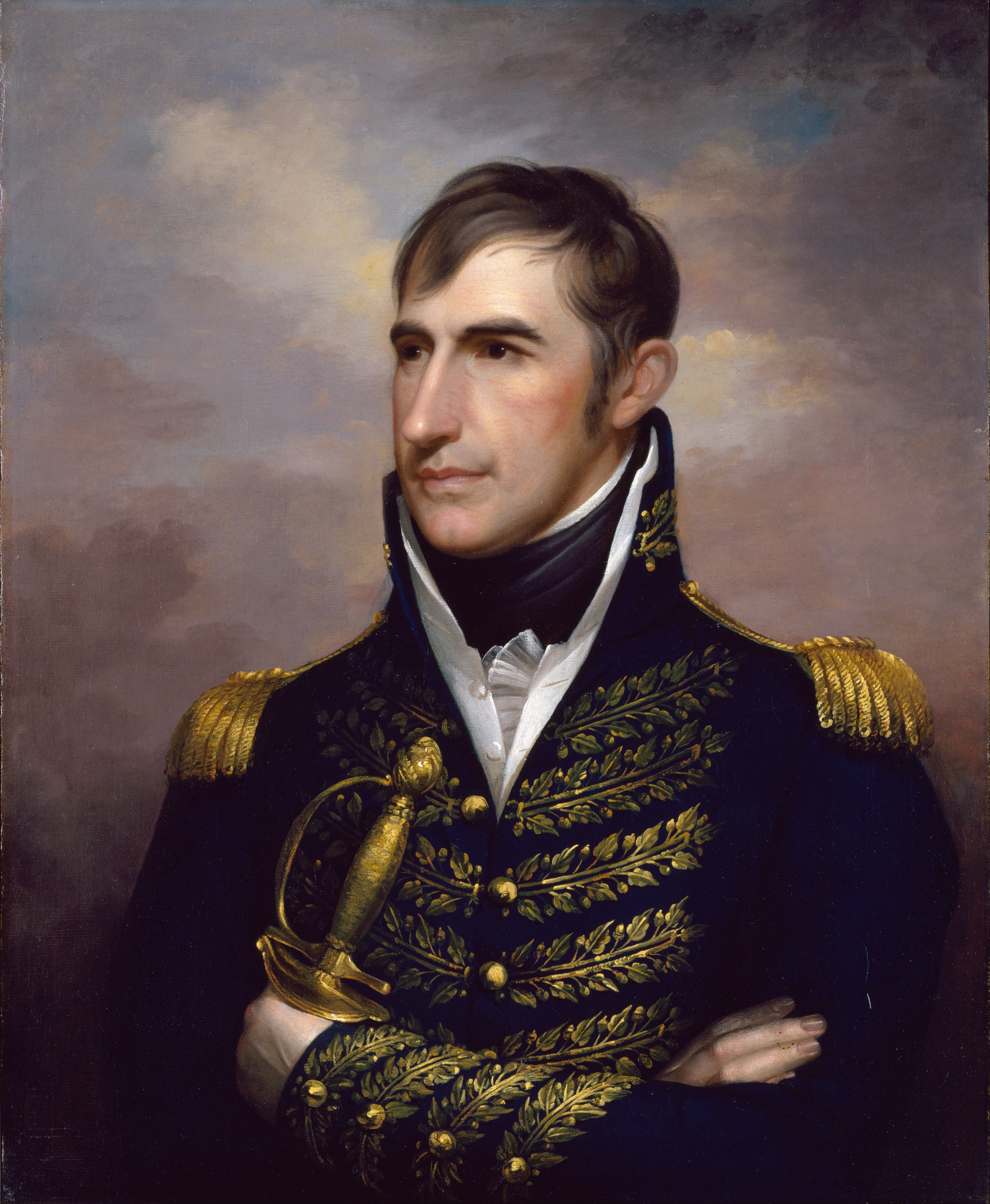
| Nominee | Ethan Allen Brown | Jeremiah Morrow | William Henry Harrison |
| Party | Democratic-Republican | Democratic-Republican | Democratic-Republican |
| Popular vote | 34,836 | 9,426 | 4,348 |
| Percentage | 71.30% | 19.29% | 8.90% |
- Election results by county Brown: 40–50% 50–60% 60–70% 70–80% 80–90% 90–100% Morrow: 40–50% 50–60% 60–70% 70–80% 80–90% 90–100% Harrison: 70–80% Unknown/no votes
Governor before election
Ethan Allen Brown
Democratic-Republican
Elected Governor
Ethan Allen Brown
Democratic-Republican

The 1820 Ohio gubernatorial election was held on October 10, 1820.

Incumbent Democratic-Republican Governor Ethan Allen Brown defeated former U.S. Senator Jeremiah Morrow and former U.S. Representative William Henry Harrison.

== General election ==
=== Results ===
1820 Ohio gubernatorial election
| Party | Candidate | Votes | % | ±% |
|---|---|---|---|---|
| Democratic-Republican | Ethan Allen Brown (incumbent) | 34,836 | 71.30% | |
| Democratic-Republican | Jeremiah Morrow | 9,426 | 19.29% | |
| Democratic-Republican | William Henry Harrison | 4,348 | 8.90% | |
| Scattering | | 248 (Note: The various sources differ on the number of scattering votes. The Journal of the Ohio House of Representatives gives the number as "about 250". The total shown is the sum of the individual county returns.) | 0.51% | |
| Majority | | 25,410 | 52.01% | |
| Turnout | | 48,858 | | |
| Democratic-Republican hold | | Swing | | |
