= 1832 Ohio gubernatorial election =

- October 9, 1832
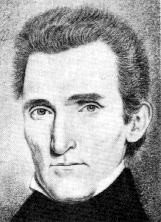

Nominee	Robert Lucas	Darius Lyman
Party	Democratic	Anti-Masonic
Alliance		National Republican
Popular vote	71,251	63,185
Percentage	52.99%	46.99%
County results
Lucas
50–60%
60–70%
70–80%
80–90%
Lyman
50–60%
60–70%
70–80%
80–90%
No data/vote
Governor before election
Duncan McArthur
National Republican
Elected Governor
Robert Lucas
Democratic

The 1832 Ohio gubernatorial election was held on October 9, 1832.

Incumbent Democratic Governor Duncan McArthur did not run for re-election, instead running for the U.S. House of Representatives.

Democratic nominee Robert Lucas defeated Anti-Masonic nominee Darius Lyman.

== General election ==
=== Candidates ===
- Robert Lucas, Democratic, state senator, Democratic nominee for governor in 1830
- Darius Lyman, Anti-Masonic, state senator

=== Withdrew ===
- Duncan McArthur, National Republican, incumbent governor; withdrew in favour of Lyman

=== Results ===
1832 Ohio gubernatorial election
Party	Candidate	Votes	%	±%
Democratic	Robert Lucas	71,251	52.99%	
Anti-Masonic	Darius Lyman	63,185	46.99%	
Scattering		33	0.02%	
Majority		8,066	6.00%	
Turnout		134,469		
Democratic gain from National Republican		Swing		
