= Othniel Looker =

Fifth Governor of Ohio (1757–1845)

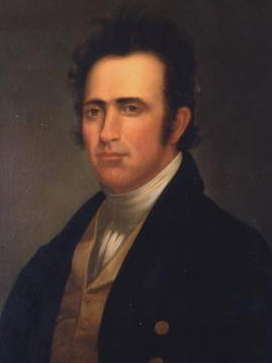

5th Governor of Ohio
- In office March 24, 1814 – December 8, 1814
- Preceded by: Return J. Meigs Jr.
- Succeeded by: Thomas Worthington

Speaker of the Ohio Senate
- In office December 6, 1813 – December 4, 1814
- Preceded by: Thomas Kirker
- Succeeded by: Thomas Kirker

Ohio Senate from Hamilton County
- In office 1810 – 1812; 1813–1817
- Preceded by: Hezekiah Price(1810); Stephen Wood (1810); John Jones (1813); Francis McCormick (1813)
- Succeeded by: John Jones (1812); Francis McCormick (1812); Ephraim Brown (1817); George P. Torrence (1817)

Ohio House of Representatives from Hamilton County
- In office 1807–1810

New York State Assembly
- In office 1803–1804

Personal details
- Born: October 4, 1757 Hanover, New Jersey
- Died: July 23, 1845 (aged 87) Palestine, Illinois

Othniel Looker (October 4, 1757 – July 23, 1845) was a Democratic-Republican Party politician from Ohio. He served briefly as the fifth governor of Ohio.

== Biography ==
Sources vary on Looker's birth location. He was born either in Morris County, New Jersey, or on Long Island, New York. His gravestone was engraved with the Morris County location.

Looker moved with his mother to Hanover Township, New Jersey, when he was two-years-old, after the death of his father. He enlisted with the New Jersey militia in 1776, and served out the remainder of the American Revolutionary War as a private.

In 1779, Looker married Pamela Clark, and circa 1788 Looker moved to Vermont and then to New York, working as a school teacher.

== Career ==
He served in the New York State Assembly from 1803 to 1804. After receiving a land grant for his war services, Looker moved to Hamilton County, Ohio in 1804, and served in the Ohio House of Representatives from 1807 to 1810. He served in the Ohio Senate from 1810 to 1817.

While serving as Speaker of the Ohio Senate from 1813 to 1814, Looker was concurrently elevated to the governorship, after then-Governor Return J. Meigs Jr. resigned to become Postmaster General. Looker sought re-election, but was badly defeated by the far more well-known Thomas Worthington. He continued to live in Ohio until his wife's death, and later moved to Palestine, Illinois, to be with his daughter Rachel Kitchell, and he is buried there in Kitchell Cemetery. Looker was the Ohio presidential elector in 1816 for James Monroe.

== Legacy ==
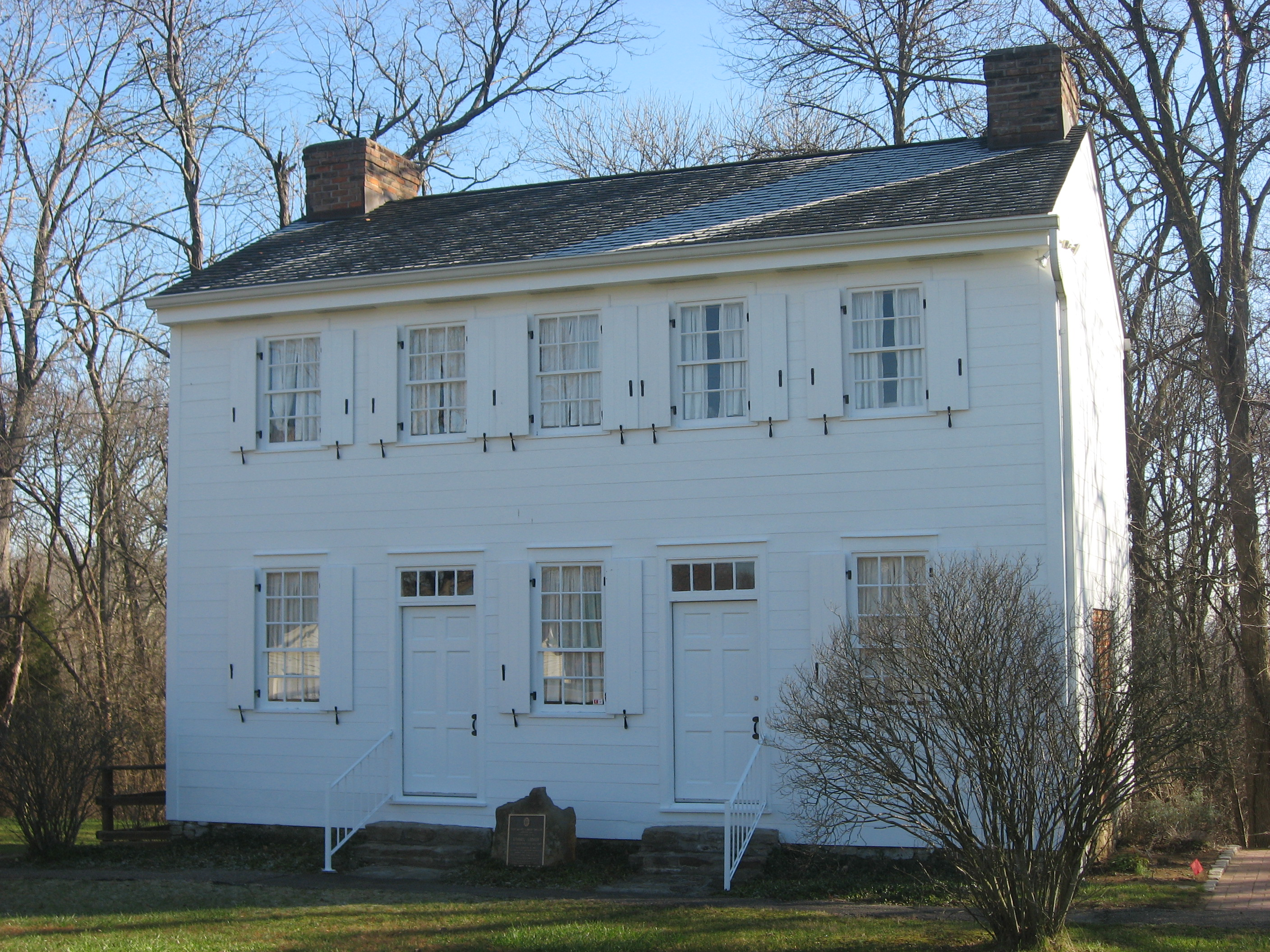
Looker's home

The Village Historical Society, in Harrison, Ohio, has restored the home of former Ohio Governor Othniel Looker. The Othniel Looker House is open to the public, free of charge, on a few dates during each year, and special tours can be arranged for school groups. The Othniel Looker House is listed on the National Register of Historic Places.

Political offices
Preceded by Thomas Kirker	Speaker of the Ohio Senate; 1813–1814	Succeeded by Thomas Kirker
Preceded by Return J. Meigs Jr.	Governor of Ohio; 1814	Succeeded by Thomas Worthington
Ohio House of Representatives
Preceded by John Jones; Hezekiah Price; Ethan Stone	Representative from Hamilton County; 1807–1810; Served alongside: Zebulon Foster, John Jones (1807–1808); James Clark, William Perry (1808–1809); James Clark, William Ludlow (1809–1810)	Succeeded by Peter Bell; John Jones; Samuel McHenry
Ohio Senate
Preceded by Hezekiah Price; Stephen Wood	Senator from Hamilton County; 1810–1812; Served alongside: Aaron Goforth, Elnathan Stone, Stephen Wood	Succeeded by John Jones; Francis McCormick
Preceded by John Jones; Francis McCormick	Senator from Hamilton County; 1813–1817; Served alongside: Ephraim Brown (1816–1817), John Jones (1813–1816)	Succeeded by Ephraim Brown; George P. Torrence
