= William A. Trimble =

American politician (1786–1821)

William Allen Trimble
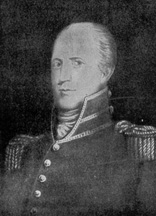
- In office March 4, 1819 – December 13, 1821
- Preceded by: Jeremiah Morrow
- Succeeded by: Ethan A. Brown

Personal details
- Born: April 4, 1786 Woodford County, Kentucky
- Died: December 13, 1821 (aged 35) Washington, D.C.
- Resting place: Congressional Cemetery; Washington, D.C.
- Party: Democratic-Republican
- Education: Transylvania College

Military service
- Branch/service: United States Army
- Years of service: 1812–1819
- Unit: Eighth United States Infantry

William Allen Trimble (April 4, 1786 – December 13, 1821) was a Democratic-Republican politician from Ohio. He was in the United States Senate.

== Biography ==
Trimble was born in Woodford, Kentucky, the son of James and Jane (Allen) Trimble. He graduated from Transylvania College and was admitted to the bar in 1811. He briefly practiced law in Highland County, Ohio, from 1811 to 1812.

In the subsequent years he served in a variety of capacities, mostly with the Ohio militia and the U.S. Army in campaigns against the Pottawatomie Indians. He was a major of the Ohio Volunteers in 1812 and major of the Twenty-sixth United States Infantry in 1813. He was promoted to lieutenant colonel of the First United States Infantry in 1814. He was transferred to the Eighth United States Infantry in 1815 and served there until his resignation in 1819, following his election to the U.S. Senate for the term beginning in 1819.

Trimble was in the Senate until his death two years later. He died in Washington, D.C., on December 13, 1821, and is interred in the Congressional Cemetery in Washington, D.C.

== See also ==
- List of members of the United States Congress who died in office (1790–1899)

== Notes ==
U.S. Senate
Preceded by Jeremiah Morrow	U.S. senator (Class 3) from Ohio; 1819–1821; Served alongside: Benjamin Ruggles	Succeeded by Ethan Allen Brown
