= Thomas Kirker =

American politician (1760–1837)

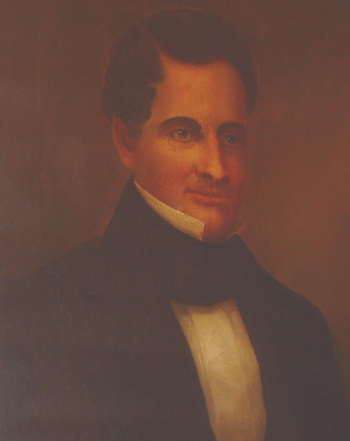

2nd Governor of Ohio
- In office March 4, 1807 – December 12, 1808
- Preceded by: Edward Tiffin
- Succeeded by: Samuel Huntington

4th Speaker of the Senate of Ohio
- In office December 1, 1806 – December 3, 1809
- Preceded by: James Pritchard
- Succeeded by: Duncan McArthur
- In office December 3, 1810 – December 5, 1813
- Preceded by: Duncan McArthur
- Succeeded by: Othniel Looker
- In office December 5, 1814 – December 3, 1815
- Preceded by: Othniel Looker
- Succeeded by: Peter Hitchcock

11th Speaker of the Ohio House of Representatives
- In office December 2, 1816 – November 30, 1817
- Preceded by: Matthias Corwin
- Succeeded by: Duncan McArthur

Member of the Ohio Senate
- In office 1803–1815; 1821–1825

Member of the Ohio House of Representatives
- In office 1803; 1816–1817

Personal details
- Born: c. 1760 County Tyrone, Kingdom of Ireland
- Died: February 19, 1837 (aged 76–77) Adams County, Ohio, U.S.
- Party: Democratic-Republican

Thomas Kirker (c. 1760 – February 19, 1837) was a Democratic-Republican politician from Ohio. He served as the second governor of Ohio.

== Biography ==
Kirker was born in County Tyrone in the Kingdom of Ireland. He moved with his family to Lancaster, Pennsylvania in 1779. Kirker married Sarah Smith in 1790, and moved with his wife to Kentucky. Three years later, they moved to Liberty Township, Adams County, Ohio. Kirker was a consistent Presbyterian, serving as an elder in the West Union congregation from 1808 until his death.

== Career ==
He was a delegate to the Ohio Constitutional Convention in 1802. He served in the first Ohio House of Representatives in 1803 and then in the Ohio State Senate from 1803 to 1815.

While serving as Speaker of the Senate, Kirker became Governor upon the resignation of Edward Tiffin to take a seat in the U.S. Senate. Kirker's term was extended through the 1807–1808 meeting of the Assembly due to the disqualification of Return J. Meigs Jr. who had won the 1807 election to the governorship but had been disqualified by the Assembly as he had not met the residency requirements.

Kirker ran for re-election in 1808, but lost badly to Samuel Huntington. Kirker later returned to the Assembly, serving in the House of Representatives from 1816 to 1817 and in the State Senate from 1821 to 1825.

He was the Ohio Presidential elector in 1824 for Henry Clay.

Kirker retired from politics, and returned to his home at his Liberty Township farm. He died on February 19, 1837. Upon his death he was buried in a family burial plot on the farm.

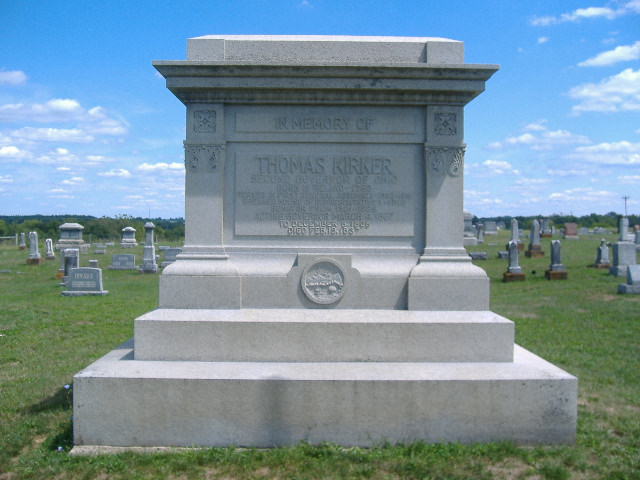
Gravestone of Thomas Kirker

== See also ==
- List of United States governors born outside the United States

Political offices
Preceded by Edward Tiffin	Governor of Ohio; 1807–1808	Succeeded by Samuel Huntington
Preceded by James Pritchard	Speaker of the Ohio Senate; 1806–1809	Succeeded by Duncan McArthur
Preceded by Duncan McArthur	Speaker of the Ohio Senate; 1810–1813	Succeeded by Othniel Looker
Preceded by Othniel Looker	Speaker of the Ohio Senate; 1814–1815	Succeeded by Peter Hitchcock
Preceded by Matthias Corwin	Speaker of the Ohio House of Representatives; 1816–1817	Succeeded by Duncan McArthur
Ohio House of Representatives
New district	Representative from Adams County; 1803; Served alongside: Joseph Lucas, William Russell	Succeeded by Daniel Collier; Abraham Shepherd; John Wright as Representatives from Adams and Scioto Counties
Preceded by John Wilson Campbell; Josiah Lockhart	Representative from Adams County; 1816–1817; Served alongside: John Ellison Jr.	Succeeded by William Middleton; Robert Morrison
Ohio Senate
Preceded by Joseph Darlinton as Senator from Adams County	Senator from Adams and Scioto Counties; 1803–1808	District eliminated
New district	Senator from Adams County; 1808–1815	Succeeded by Abraham Shepherd
Preceded by William Russell	Senator from Adams County; 1821–1825	Succeeded by Abraham Shepherd as Senator from Adams and Brown Counties
