= Edward Tiffin =

American politician (1766–1829)

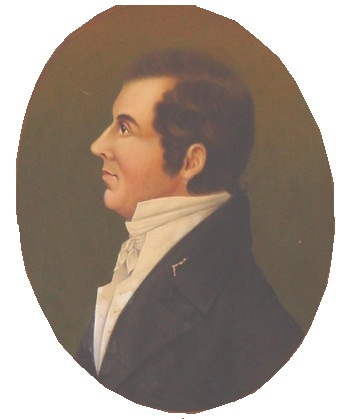

4th Surveyor General of the Northwest Territory
- In office 1815 – August 9, 1829
- Preceded by: Josiah Meigs
- Succeeded by: William Lytle II

1st Commissioner of the General Land Office
- In office May 7, 1812 – October 11, 1814
- Preceded by: Inaugural holder
- Succeeded by: Josiah Meigs

8th Speaker of the Ohio House of Representatives
- In office December 4, 1809 – December 1, 1811
- Preceded by: Alexander Campbell
- Succeeded by: Matthias Corwin

United States Senator from Ohio
- In office March 4, 1807 – March 3, 1809
- Preceded by: Thomas Worthington
- Succeeded by: Stanley Griswold

1st Governor of Ohio
- In office March 3, 1803 – March 4, 1807
- Preceded by: Charles Willing Byrd (as Governor of the Northwest Territory)
- Succeeded by: Thomas Kirker

1st Speaker of the Northwest Territory House of Representatives
- In office September 16, 1799 – January 23, 1802
- Preceded by: Inaugural holder
- Succeeded by: Michael Baldwin (as Speaker of the Ohio House of Representatives)

Personal details
- Born: June 19, 1766 Carlisle, Cumberland, England
- Died: August 9, 1829 (aged 63) Chillicothe, Ohio, U.S.
- Resting place: Grandview Cemetery; Chillicothe, Ohio
- Party: Democratic-Republican
- Spouse: Mary Worthington
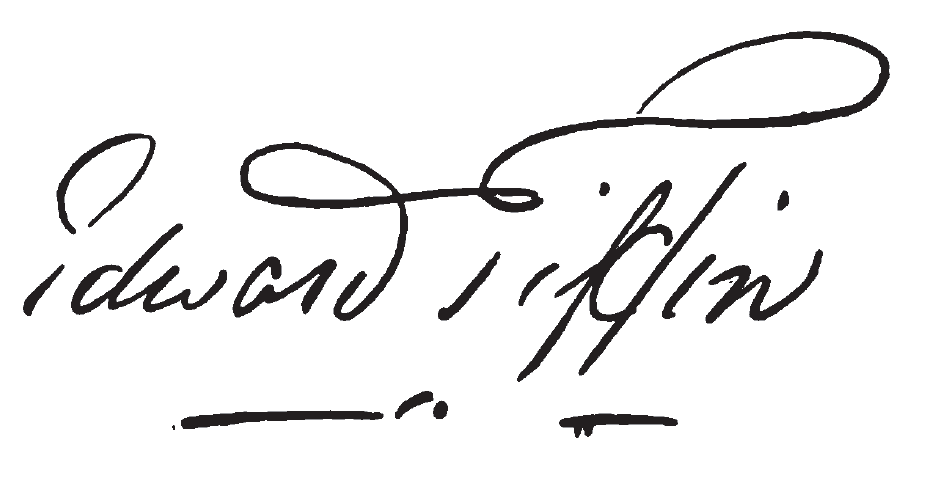
- Signature

Edward Tiffin (June 19, 1766 – August 9, 1829) was an American politician who served as the first governor of Ohio and later as a United States senator from Ohio as a member of the Democratic-Republican party.

== Biography ==
Sources indicate that he was born in Carlisle; however he may have been born in or near Workington — also in the then county of Cumberland, England. Tiffin attended the Latin school in Carlisle, and became an apprentice to a student of medicine in 1778. Six years later he completed his apprenticeship. His family emigrated to Virginia in 1783, and he began practicing medicine at the age of seventeen.

In 1789, he married Mary Worthington of Berkeley County, sister of future Governor of Ohio Thomas Worthington. She died, childless, in 1808. A year after their marriage, the Tiffins joined the Methodist church after hearing the preaching of Thomas Scott, who would be their neighbor and friend for many years. Bishop Asbury ordained Tiffin a deacon of the Methodist church November 19, 1792, authorizing him to preach. Tiffin and Worthington inherited sixteen slaves when Worthington's father died. They each decided to manumit their slaves and move to the Northwest Territory, where slavery was outlawed. Tiffin headed westward, along with Thomas Worthington, in 1798, settling in Chillicothe, Ohio.

== Northwest Territory ==
Tiffin became the first medical doctor in Chillicothe, traveling on horseback, day and night, to treat the afflicted. He arrived with a letter addressed to the governor of the Northwest Territory, Arthur St. Clair from George Washington, recommending him for public office. Tiffin served as the Speaker of the Territorial House of Representatives from 1799 to 1801 and as president of the 1802 Constitutional Convention, where he cast a tie-breaking vote to deny the voting franchise to the new state's 337 African American residents. He was a leader of the Chillicothe Junto, a group of Chillicothe Democratic-Republican politicians who brought about the admission of Ohio as a state in 1803 and largely controlled its politics for some years thereafter. Among his colleagues in the faction were Thomas Worthington and Nathaniel Massie.

Tiffin was the obvious choice for the governorship when Ohio was admitted to the Union. He was elected almost without opposition to a first term and re-elected by similarly overwhelming numbers two years later. Tiffin acted promptly to stop the Burr conspiracy in his second term.

Tiffin was elected to the U.S. Senate in 1806 and resigned the governorship in March 1807 to take his seat. He served only two years, however, resigning after the death of his wife. "He was ever faithful to the interests of the West and diligent in seeking the welfare of its inhabitants. He procured an appropriation of public money for the improvement of the Ohio River. He secured better and speedier transportation of the mails; a better and more rapid system for the surveys of western lands; and urged such modifications of the laws regarding sales of western land as would, to use his own words, 'guard the purchasers of them from unnecessary embarrassments and frequent ruin.' " He also voted for the expulsion of the other Ohio Senator, John Smith, who had been implicated in the Burr conspiracy. He spent only a few months at home, however, before being elected to the Ohio House of Representatives, where he served as speaker from 1809 to 1811. Tiffin remarried April 16, 1809, to Mary Porter, originally from Delaware, and then of Ross County. Tiffin became the first commissioner of the United States General Land Office, which managed allocations of Federal lands.

He quickly helped remove the Federal records from Washington before it was sacked during the War of 1812. In 1814, he became the Surveyor General of the Northwest Territory, exchanging positions with Josiah Meigs so that he might spend more time near his home in Chillicothe. Tiffin served in the post until his death.

== Death ==
Tiffin was buried in Grandview Cemetery, Ross County, Ohio. His death was reported in the newspapers, such as this notice in the Brattleboro Messenger (Brattleboro, VT), Sep. 18, 1829, p. 3: At Chillicothe, Doct. Edward Tiffin, formerly Governor of Ohio, and late Surveyor General of the United States, aged 64 years.

== Legacy ==
The city of Tiffin in northwestern Ohio was named in honor of Tiffin in 1822.

No man who has occupied the gubernatorial chair of Ohio has possessed a greater genius for the administration of public affairs than Edward Tiffin, its first governor. He appeared upon the scene of action in the Northwest Territory in its creative period, when the work of moulding the destinies of a future commonwealth was committed to the care of a very few men. Head and shoulders above them all stood Edward Tiffin. His official life displayed a better general average of statesmanship than that of any of his successors. ... His work in advancing and developing Ohio has not been equalled by any man in its history.

— Daniel J. Ryan, 1888

== See also ==
- List of United States governors born outside the United States
- List of United States senators born outside the United States

== Notes ==
U.S. Senate
Preceded by Thomas Worthington	U.S. senator (Class 3) from Ohio; 1807–1809; Served alongside: John Smith, Return J. Meigs Jr.	Succeeded by Stanley Griswold
Government offices
Preceded by new office	Commissioner of the General Land Office; 1812–1814	Succeeded by Josiah Meigs
Preceded by Josiah Meigs	Surveyor General of the Northwest Territory; 1815–1829	Succeeded by William Lytle
Political offices
Preceded by	Delegate to 1802 Ohio Constitutional Convention from Ross County; November 1–29, 1802; Served alongside: James Grubb; Nathaniel Massie; Thomas Worthington; Michael Baldwin	Succeeded by
