= 1830 Ohio gubernatorial election =

- October 12, 1830
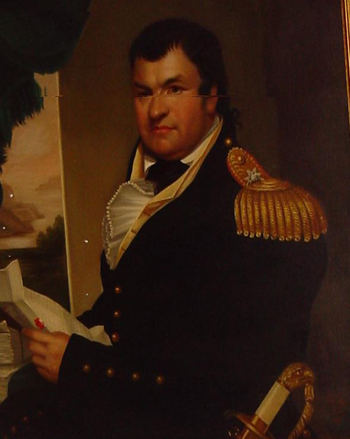

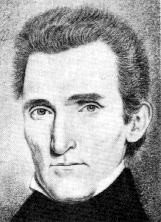
Nominee	Duncan McArthur	Robert Lucas
Party	National Republican	Democratic
Popular vote	49,668	49,186
Percentage	50.13%	49.64%
County results
McArthur
50–60%
60–70%
70–80%
80–90%
90–100%
Lucas
50–60%
60–70%
70–80%
No data/vote
Governor before election
Allen Trimble
National Republican
Elected Governor
Duncan McArthur
National Republican

The 1830 Ohio gubernatorial election was held on October 12, 1830.

Incumbent National Republican Governor Allen Trimble did not run for re-election.

National Republican nominee Duncan McArthur defeated Democratic nominee Robert Lucas.

== General election ==
=== Candidates ===
- Robert Lucas, Democratic, Speaker of the Ohio Senate
- Duncan McArthur, National Republican, former U.S. representative

=== Results ===
1830 Ohio gubernatorial election
Party	Candidate	Votes	%	±%
National Republican	Duncan McArthur	49,668	50.13%	
Democratic	Robert Lucas	49,186	49.64%	
Scattering		226	0.23%	
Majority		482	0.49%	
Turnout		99,080		
National Republican hold		Swing		
