= Nathaniel Massie =

American politician

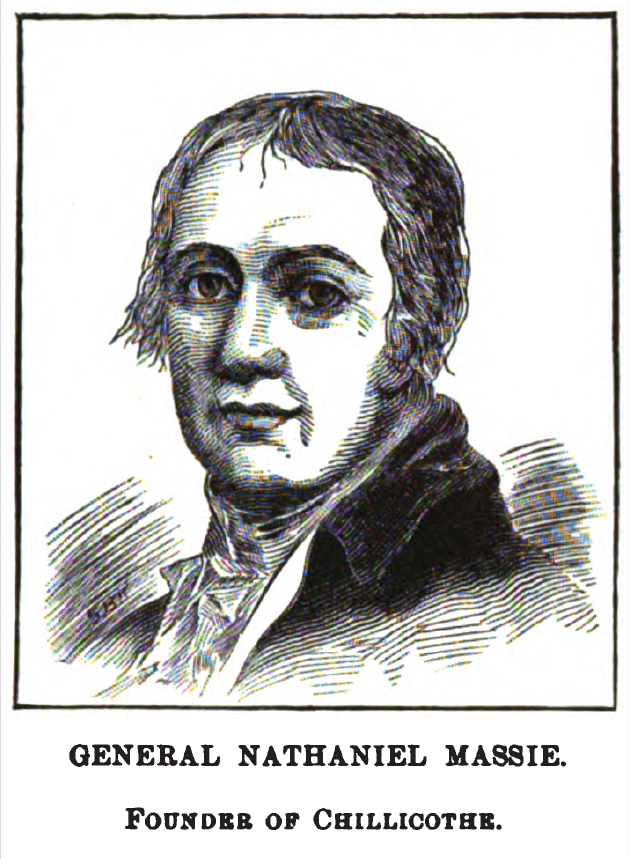
- sketch by Henry Howe

first Speaker of the Ohio Senate
- In office March 1, 1803 – December 4, 1803
- Preceded by: new office
- Succeeded by: Daniel Symmes

Personal details
- Born: December 28, 1763 Goochland, Virginia
- Died: November 13, 1813 (aged 49) Paint Creek Falls, Ohio
- Resting place: Grandview Cemetery, Chillicothe
- Party: Democratic-Republican

Nathaniel Massie (December 28, 1763 – November 13, 1813) was a frontier surveyor in the Ohio Country (including the Virginia Military District) who became a prominent land owner, politician, and soldier. He founded fourteen early towns in what became the State of Ohio, including its first capital, Chillicothe. In 1807, the Ohio General Assembly declared him the winner of the election for governor, but he refused the office.

== Early life ==
A native of the colony of Virginia, Massie served briefly in the Virginia militia during the American Revolutionary War. After becoming a surveyor, he established the first town in the Virginia Military District at what is now Manchester. He platted the town of Chillicothe on his own land. Massie was one of the largest landowners in early Ohio, and served as a major general in the Ohio militia.

== Political career ==
Massie served as a Ross county delegate to the 1802 Ohio Constitutional Convention and was a leader of the Jeffersonian faction that supported statehood. He was a leader of the Chillicothe Junto, a group of Chillicothe Democratic-Republican politicians who brought about the admission of Ohio as a state in 1803, and largely controlled its politics for some years thereafter. Among his colleagues in the faction were Thomas Worthington and Edward Tiffin. He was a Presidential elector for Thomas Jefferson in 1804 and James Madison in 1808. He was a Trustee of Ohio University from 1804 to 1808. Massie served in the General Assembly and was the first president of the Ohio Senate.

== Death ==
Massie led troops in the War of 1812, but died of pneumonia in the late autumn of 1813 at the age of 49. He is interred in Grandview Cemetery, Chillicothe in Ross County, Ohio.

== Legacy ==
The Nathaniel Massie Chapter of the Daughters of the American Revolution (DAR) in Chillicothe is named in the general's honor, as is Massie Township in Warren County, Ohio and the Clinton-Massie Local School District that serves the area.

Massie is a member of the Ohio Hall of Fame.

A monument to Massie stands along U.S. Route 50, just west of Bainbridge, a town he founded. It commemorates his life, as well as marking the approximate location of his home in the Paint Valley. The memorial was dedicated in September 1938.

The inscription on the monument reads: "Home Of General Nathaniel Massie. Built 1800, One Fourth Mile South. Nathaniel Massie, Born Goochland County, Virginia, December 28, 1763, 1800 Married Sarah Everard Mead, Died November 13, 1813. Revolutionary Soldier; Surveyor Of Wilderness Then Known As Northwest Territory And Locator Of Revolutionary War Land Grants. 1786-87 Cut Road Lexington, Kentucky To Great Kanawha River. 1791 Founded Manchester, Ohio. 1790-94 Explored Little Miami And Scioto Rivers To Their Sources. April 1796 Founded Chillicothe, Ohio. Massie Was Member Of Convention Framing First Ohio Constitution. Was First Speaker Of State Legislature. 1799 Organized First Militia Northwest Territory. Commissioned Major General. 1805 Founded Bainbridge, Ohio, One Of Fourteen Towns Founded By Him. Erected By The Ohio Society Daughters Of The American Colonists - Sept. 21, 1938."

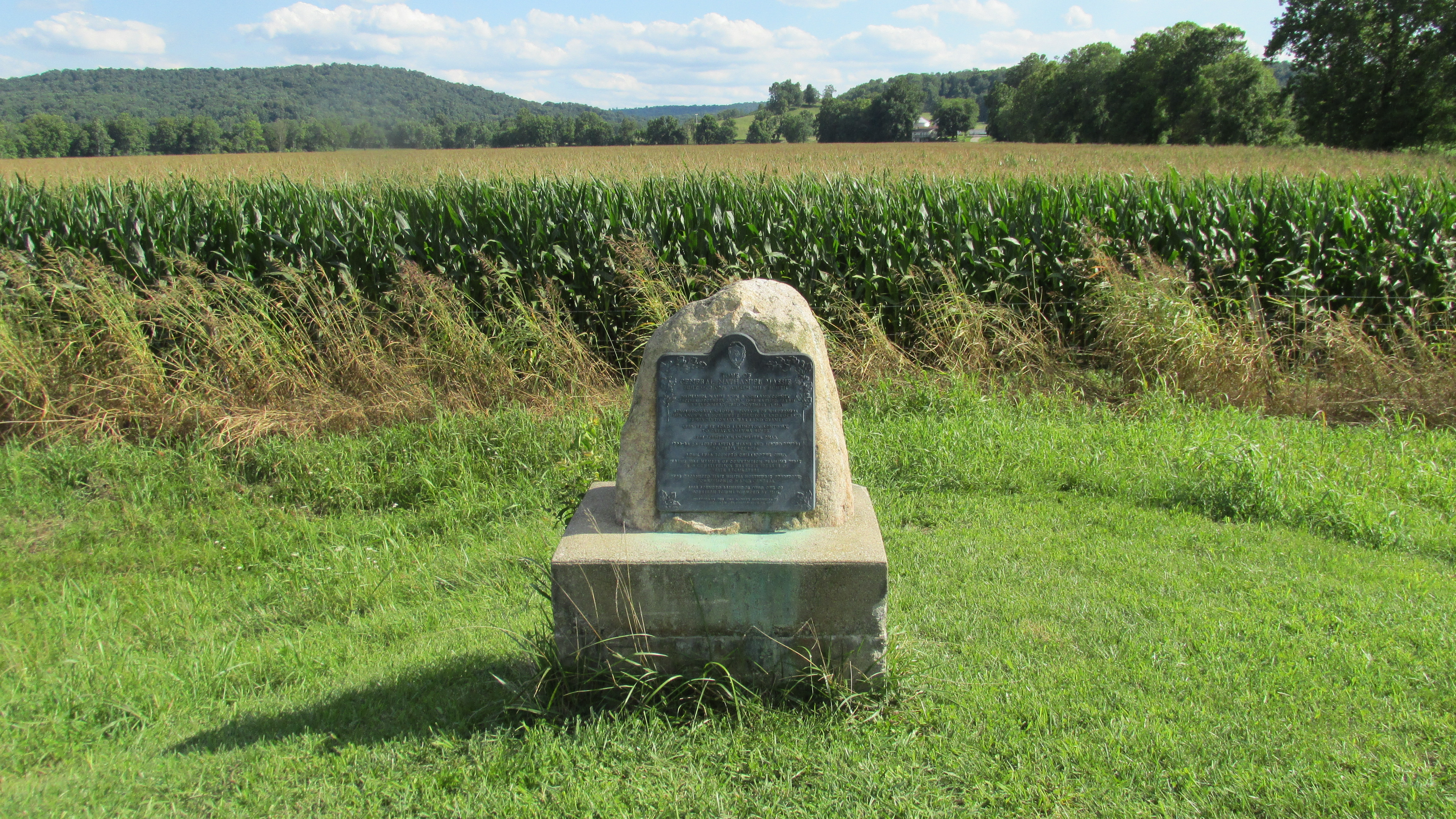
Nathaniel Massie monument located on US Highway 50 west of Bainbridge, Ohio.

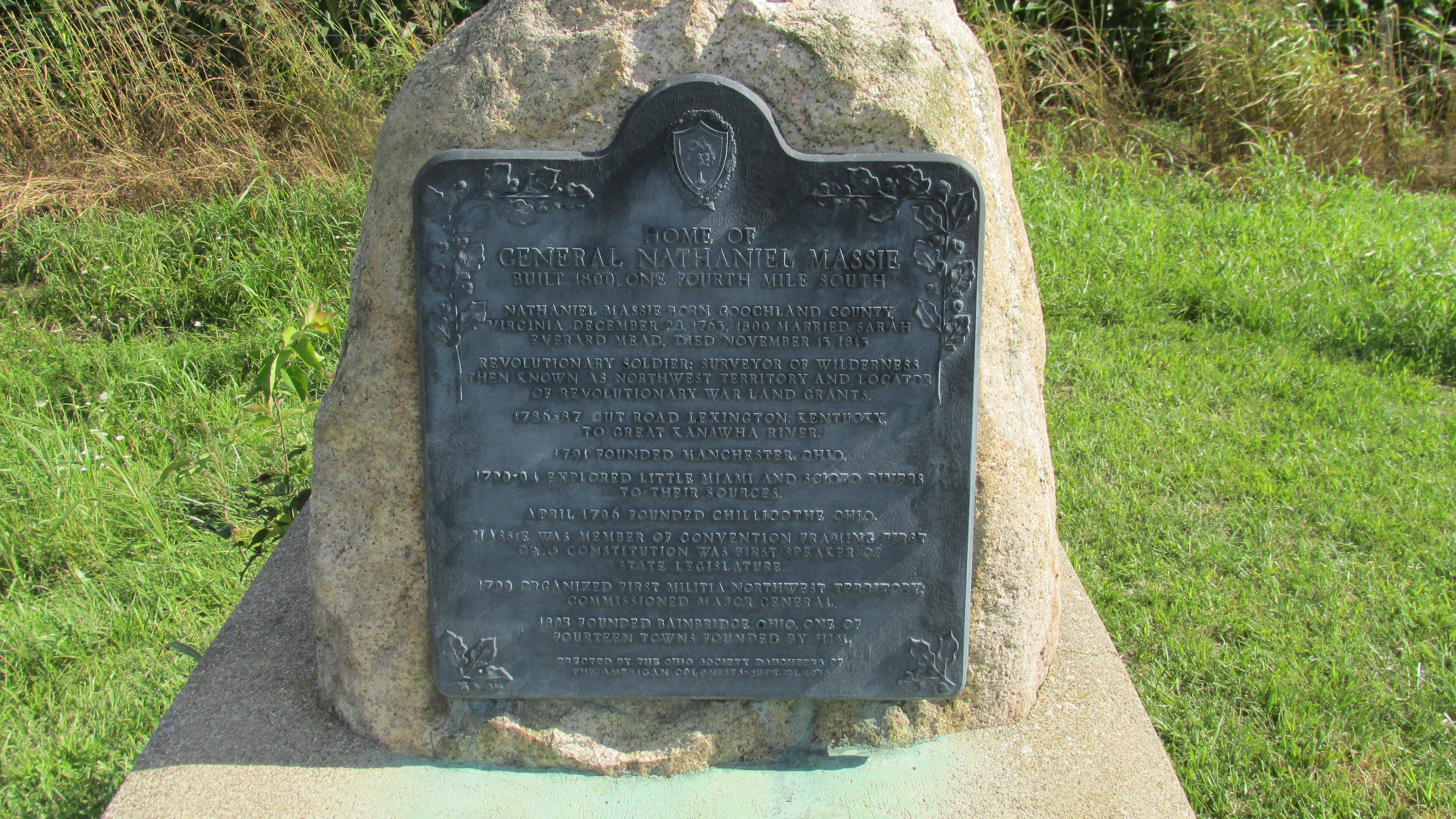
Memorial plaque on Nathaniel Massie monument.

== External sources ==
- Nathaniel Massie at Ohio History Central
- "Massie, Nathaniel" . Appletons' Cyclopædia of American Biography. Vol. IV. 1900. p. 250.

Ohio Senate
Preceded by new seat	Senator from Ross County; 1803-1804; Served alongside: Abraham Claypool	Succeeded by Joseph Kerr; Abraham Claypool
Ohio Senate
Preceded by new position	Speaker of the Senate; 1803-1804	Succeeded by James Pritchard
Ohio House of Representatives
Preceded by David Shelby; James Dunlap; Abraham Williams; Elias Langham	Representative from Ross County; 1806-1807; Served alongside: David Shelby, James Dunlap, Elias Langham	Succeeded by Thomas Worthington; Elias Langham; Jeremiah McLene; William Lewis
Ohio House of Representatives
Preceded by James Dunlap; Jessup Nash Couch; Joseph Kerr; David Shelby; Samuel Monnett	Representative from Ross County; 1809-1810; Served alongside: James Dunlap, Edward Tiffin, David Shelby, Joseph Gardner	Succeeded by Abraham Claypool, Edward Tiffin; James Manary; William Creighton, Jr. Henry Brush
Political offices
Preceded by	Delegate to 1802 Ohio Constitutional Convention from Ross County; November 1–29, 1802; Served alongside: James Grubb; Edward Tiffin; Thomas Worthington; Michael Baldwin	Succeeded by
