= Ethan Allen Brown =

American judge (1776–1852)

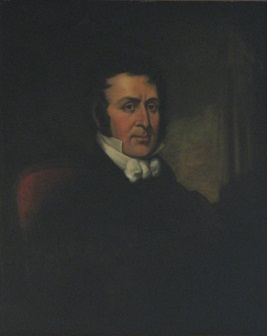

United States Chargé d'Affaires to Brazil
- In office February 18, 1831 – April 11, 1834
- President: Andrew Jackson
- Preceded by: William Tudor
- Succeeded by: William Hunter

United States Senator from Ohio
- In office January 4, 1822 – March 3, 1825
- Preceded by: William A. Trimble
- Succeeded by: William Henry Harrison

7th Governor of Ohio
- In office December 14, 1818 – January 3, 1822
- Preceded by: Thomas Worthington
- Succeeded by: Allen Trimble

Personal details
- Born: July 4, 1776 Darien, Connecticut, U.S.
- Died: February 24, 1852 (aged 75) Indianapolis, Indiana, U.S.
- Party: Democratic-Republican; Jacksonian; Democratic

Ethan Allen Brown (July 4, 1776 – February 24, 1852) was a Democratic-Republican politician. He served as the seventh governor of Ohio.

== Biography ==
Brown was born in Darien, Connecticut to Roger Brown, a prosperous farmer and a Revolutionary War veteran.

Brown studied with a private tutor, and he was proficient in French, Latin and Greek. He studied law under Alexander Hamilton for five years and was admitted to the bar in 1802.

== Career ==
He moved near Cincinnati, Ohio in 1803. He was appointed to the Ohio Supreme Court in 1810 and was re-elected in 1817. Brown was elected to the governorship a year later and was re-elected in 1820. He resigned on January 3, 1822, to take office in the U.S. Senate after the death of William A. Trimble. He was defeated for re-election in 1824 by William Henry Harrison.

Brown was the Ohio Presidential elector in 1828 for Andrew Jackson. An active supporter of Andrew Jackson, Brown was appointed Chargé d'Affaires to Brazil in 1830 and served for four years. He then served as commissioner of the General Land Office in Washington, D.C. from 1835 to 1836.

In 1836, he retired to a family farm in Indiana most likely staying at the David Brown House in Ohio County. Brown later served a single term in the Indiana House of Representatives from 1841 to 1843.

== Honors and memberships ==
Brown was elected a member of the American Antiquarian Society in 1818.

== Death ==
Brown died in 1852 at a Democratic Convention held in Indianapolis, Indiana, and is buried in the Cedar Hedge Cemetery located in Rising Sun, the county seat of Ohio County, Indiana.

Legal offices
Preceded by George Tod	Ohio Supreme Court Justice; February 10, 1810 – December 11, 1818	Succeeded by Peter Hitchcock
Political offices
Preceded by Thomas Worthington	Governor of Ohio; 1818–1822	Succeeded by Allen Trimble
Preceded by Elijah Hayward	Commissioner of the General Land Office; 1835–1836	Succeeded by James Whitcomb
U.S. Senate
Preceded by William A. Trimble	U.S. senator (Class 3) from Ohio; 1822–1825; Served alongside: Benjamin Ruggles	Succeeded by William Henry Harrison
Diplomatic posts
Preceded by William Tudor	United States Chargé d'Affaires, Brazil; 18 February 1831 – 11 April 1834	Succeeded by William Hunter
