= Samuel Huntington (Ohio politician) =

American judge (1765–1817)

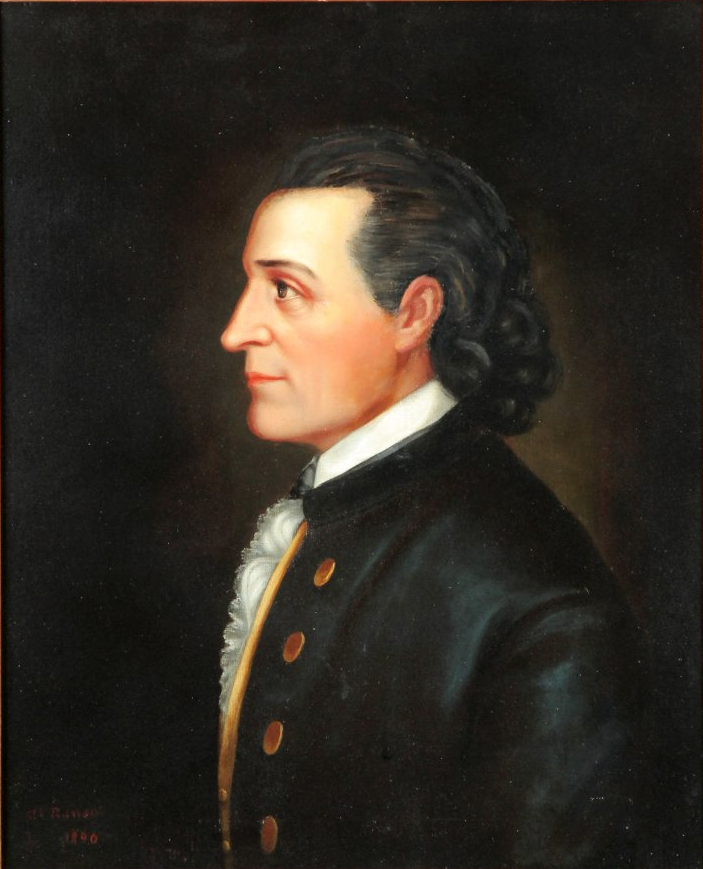
- Posthumous portrait by Caroline L. Ormes Ransom, 1870

3rd Governor of Ohio
- In office December 12, 1808 – December 8, 1810
- Preceded by: Thomas Kirker
- Succeeded by: Return J. Meigs, Jr.

Ohio Senate from Trumbull County
- In office 1803–1803
- Preceded by: New District
- Succeeded by: Benjamin Tappan

Ohio House of Representatives from Geauga, Ashtabula, and Cuyahoga Counties
- In office 1811–1812
- Preceded by: Peter Hitchcock
- Succeeded by: Samuel S. Baldwin

Judge of the Ohio Supreme Court
- In office 1803–1808
- Preceded by: Unknown
- Succeeded by: Thomas Morris

Personal details
- Born: October 4, 1765 Coventry, Colony of Connecticut, British America
- Died: June 8, 1817 (aged 51) Fairport Harbor, Ohio, U.S.
- Party: Democratic-Republican

Samuel Huntington (Note: Occasionally known as Samuel Huntington Jr.) (October 4, 1765 – June 8, 1817) was an American jurist who was the third governor of Ohio from 1808 to 1810.

== Biography ==
Huntington was born in Coventry in the Colony of Connecticut. He was the nephew (and, later, the adopted son) of Samuel Huntington, the fourth President of the Continental Congress and first President of the United States in Congress Assembled under the Articles of Confederation.

Huntington studied at Dartmouth College until the end of his junior year. He then transferred to Yale College, from which he was graduated in 1785. He was admitted to the bar and began practicing law in Connecticut. In 1801, he moved to Ohio with his wife, Hannah, and their young sons, settling in the tiny village of Cleveland.

== Career ==
After serving as a Trumbull county delegate to the State's first constitutional convention, Huntington was selected as an associate justice of the Ohio Supreme Court and succeeded Return J. Meigs, Jr. as Chief Justice a year later. He served until being elected Governor in 1808. His tenure was stormy, with much controversy over the impeachment of two judges for upholding the principle of judicial review (Huntington would have been impeached as well had he not been being elected governor), the move of the state capital from Zanesville to Chillicothe, and the Tiffin Resolution, which terminated the terms of all sitting judges. Huntington did not stand for re-election, but instead ran for the U.S. Senate, losing to Thomas Worthington.

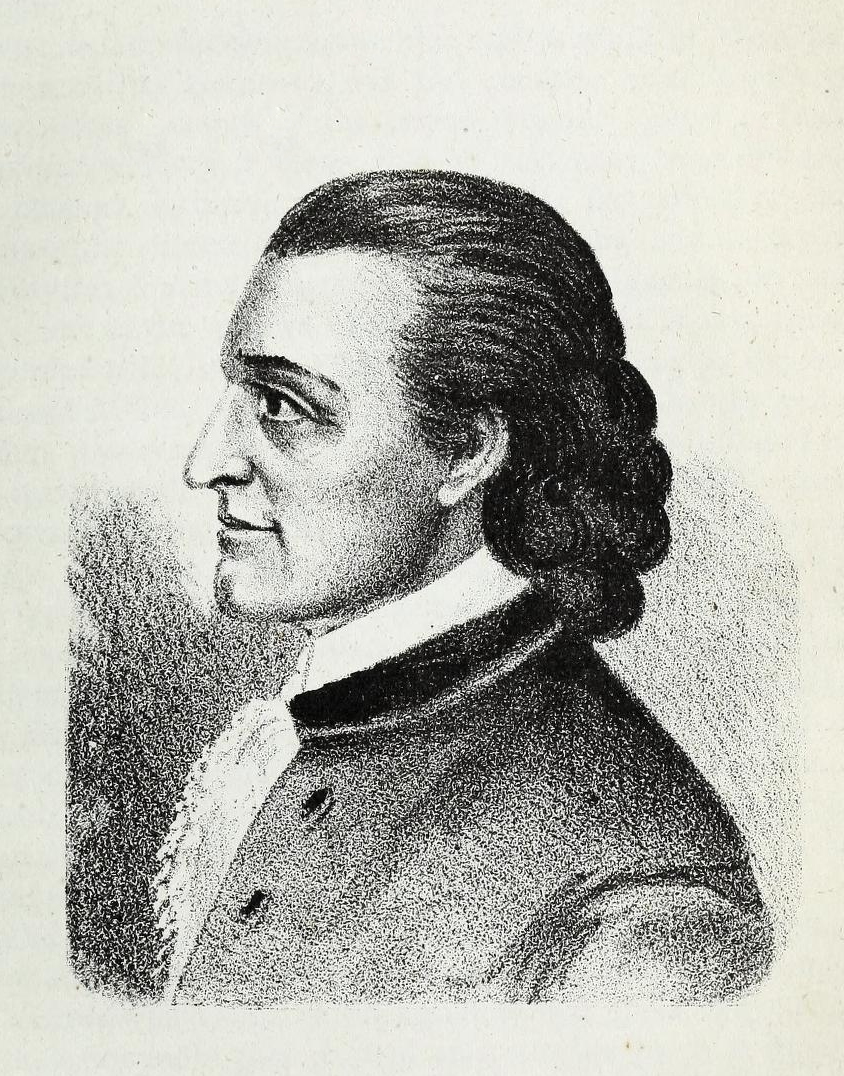
Pencil sketch of Samuel Huntington.

Huntington was also an active Freemason, and served as the second Grand Master of the Grand Lodge F.&A.M. of Ohio in 1809.

Political offices
Preceded by Thomas Kirker	Governor of Ohio; 1808–1810	Succeeded by Return J. Meigs, Jr.
Ohio Senate
New district	Senator from Trumbull County; 1803	Succeeded by Benjamin Tappan
Ohio House of Representatives
Preceded by Peter Hitchcock as Representative from Geauga and Cuyahoga Counties	Representative from Geauga, Ashtabula, and Cuyahoga Counties; 1811–1812	Succeeded by Samuel S. Baldwin
Legal offices
New title	Judge of the Ohio Supreme Court; 1803–1808	Succeeded by Thomas Morris
