= Return J. Meigs Jr. =

American politician and judge (1764 – 1825)

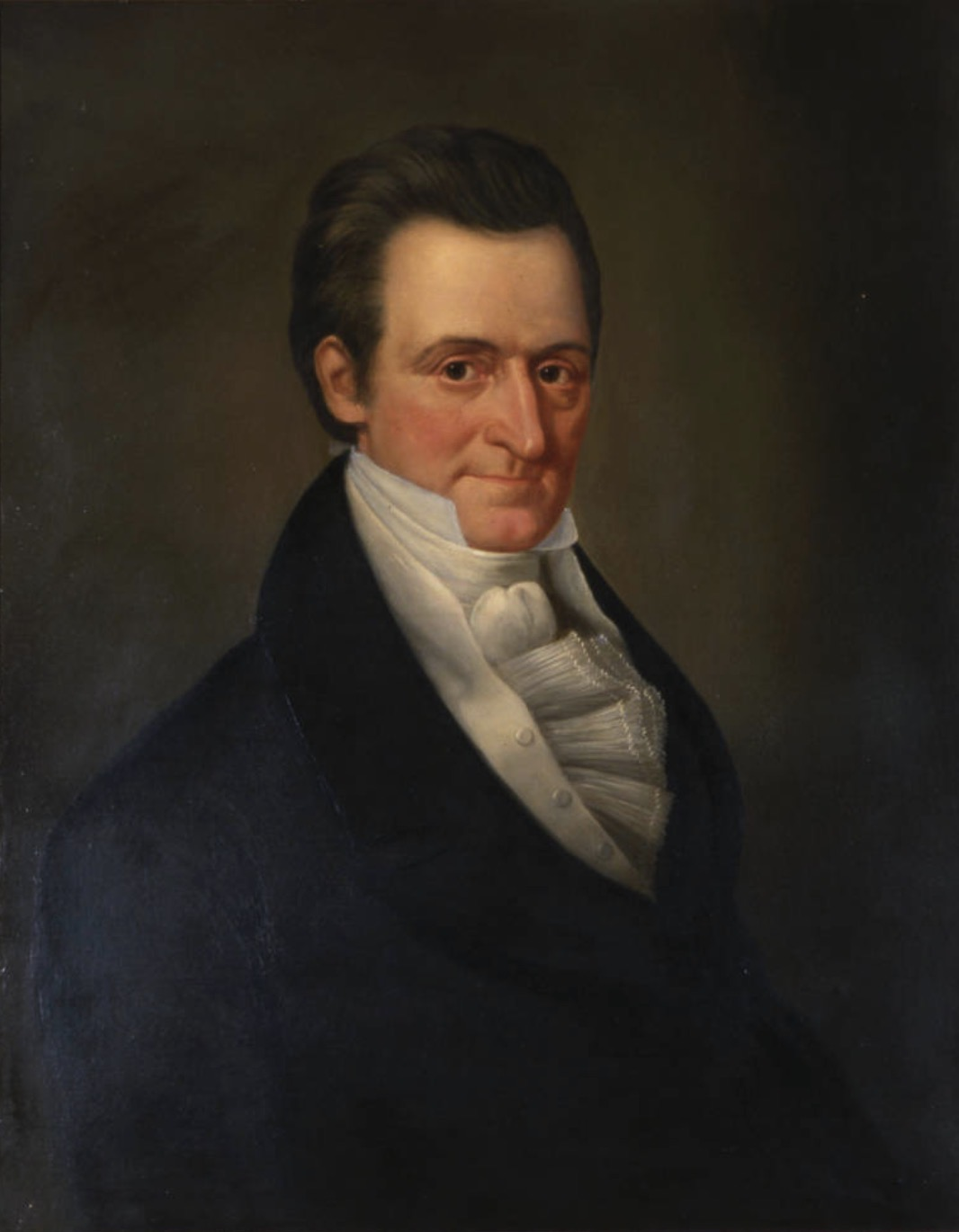
- Posthumous portrait by John Henry Witt

8th United States Postmaster General
- In office March 17, 1814 – before June 26, 1823
- President: James Madison; James Monroe
- Preceded by: Gideon Granger
- Succeeded by: John McLean

4th Governor of Ohio
- In office December 8, 1810 – March 24, 1814
- Preceded by: Samuel Huntington
- Succeeded by: Othniel Looker

United States Senator from Ohio
- In office December 12, 1808 – December 8, 1810
- Preceded by: John Smith
- Succeeded by: Thomas Worthington

Chief Judge of the Ohio Supreme Court
- In office 1803–1804
- Preceded by: Position established
- Succeeded by: Samuel Huntington

Member of the Northwest Territory House of Representatives from Washington County
- In office 1799–1801
- Preceded by: Constituency established
- Succeeded by: Ephraim Cutler; Rufus Putnam

Personal details
- Born: Return Jonathan Meigs Jr. November 17, 1764 Middletown, Connecticut, British America
- Died: March 29, 1825 (aged 60) Marietta, Ohio, U.S.
- Resting place: Mound Cemetery
- Party: Democratic-Republican
- Spouse: Sophia Wright
- Education: Yale University (BA)

Military service
- Allegiance: United States
- Branch/service: United States Army
- Rank: Brevet Colonel

Return Jonathan Meigs Jr. (/ˈmɛɡz/; November 17, 1764 – March 29, 1825) was a Democratic-Republican politician from Ohio. He served as the fourth governor of Ohio, eighth United States Postmaster General, and as a United States senator.

== Early life ==
Meigs was born in Middletown in the Colony of Connecticut on November 17, 1764. He was the son of Return J. Meigs Sr. and the descendant of early Puritan settlers in Massachusetts. He graduated from Yale College in 1785 and studied law there. In 1788, after being admitted to the bar in Connecticut, he moved to Marietta, Ohio, where his father had been one of the first settlers, arriving earlier that year.

== Career ==
In Marietta, Meigs was a lawyer, storekeeper and farmer, as well as serving in public offices. He was appointed the first court clerk for the court established at Marietta in 1788. When a post office was established in Marietta in 1794, he became its first postmaster. In 1798 he was named to a judgeship on the Northwest Territory's territorial court, and in 1799 he won election to the territorial legislature.

In 1803 he was appointed the first chief justice of the Ohio State Supreme Court. In October 1804, he resigned this position to become commandant of U. S. troops in the St. Charles district of the Louisiana Territory. He attained the rank of Brevet Colonel and retained the command until 1806. In 1805 he was chosen as judge of the Supreme Court of Louisiana and then in 1807, judge of the United States District Court for the Michigan Territory.

He returned to Ohio in 1807 to run for governor. He won the election but was declared ineligible for failing to meet the residency requirements. He then was appointed to the U.S. Senate to finish the term of John Smith and was re-elected to his own term a year later. He resigned in late 1810 after winning the governorship.

He served two two-year terms, resigning in April 1814 when appointed Postmaster general by President James Madison. His service as Postmaster General was not without controversy. Congress investigated him twice, and he was cleared both times. The size of the Post Office doubled during his tenure, which implicated financial difficulties. He served until 1823, when he retired due to ill health and returned to Marietta.

Meigs died March 29, 1825, and is buried in Marietta's Mound Cemetery. His grave is marked by a large monument bearing a long inscription reciting his public services and family devotion.

== Family ==
Meigs was married in 1788 to Sophia Wright, and they had one child, a daughter named Mary who married congressman and federal Judge John George Jackson of Clarksburg, Virginia, in 1810.

Return J. Meigs Jr. did not have a direct male heir, but two of his younger brothers, John and Timothy, each named a son Return Jonathan Meigs. The first of these—called Return J. Meigs III—passed the bar in Frankfort, Kentucky, commenced law practice in Athens, Tennessee, and became prominent in Tennessee state affairs before the Civil War. He moved to Staten Island, New York, however, at the time of Tennessee's secession from the Union in 1861. Among those men who read law under his tutelage in Tennessee was William Parish Chilton who would become Chief Justice of the Alabama Supreme Court.

Timothy's son, Return J. Meigs IV, married Jennie Ross, daughter of principal Cherokee chief John Ross, and emigrated to Oklahoma on the Trail of Tears.

== Legacy ==
Meigs County, Ohio, is named in his honor. (Meigs County, Tennessee, is named for his father.) Fort Meigs in Perrysburg, Ohio, was named in his honor during the War of 1812 by William Henry Harrison.

== Bibliography ==
- Meigs, Return Jonathan Jr. (1764–1825): A Prophecy, Ohio Archæological and Historical Society Publications: Volume 20 [1911], pp. 351–352, poem by Return J. Meigs Jr.

Political offices
Preceded by Samuel Huntington	Governor of Ohio; 1810–1814	Succeeded by Othniel Looker
Government offices
Preceded by Gideon Granger	United States Postmaster General; Served under: James Madison, James Monroe; 1814–1823	Succeeded by John McLean
Assembly seats
New district	Member of the Northwest Territory House of Representatives from Washington County; 1799–1801; Served alongside: Paul Fearing	Succeeded by Ephraim Cutler; Rufus Putnam
U.S. Senate
Preceded by John Smith	Senator from Ohio (Class 1); 1808–1810; Served alongside: Edward Tiffin, Stanley Griswold, Alexander Campbell	Succeeded by Thomas Worthington
Legal offices
New title	Chief Judge of the Ohio Supreme Court; 1803–1804	Vacant Title next held by Hugh L. Nichols as Chief Justice of the Ohio Supreme Court
