= Thomas Worthington (Ohio politician) =

Governor of Ohio (1773–1827)

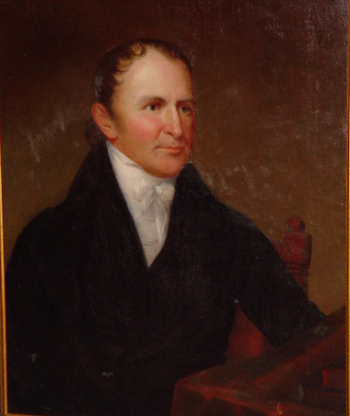

6th Governor of Ohio
- In office December 8, 1814 – December 14, 1818
- Preceded by: Othniel Looker
- Succeeded by: Ethan Allen Brown

United States Senator from Ohio
- In office December 15, 1810 – December 1, 1814
- Preceded by: Return J. Meigs, Jr.
- Succeeded by: Joseph Kerr
- In office April 1, 1803 – March 3, 1807
- Preceded by: Inaugural holder
- Succeeded by: Edward Tiffin

Member of the Ohio House of Representatives from the Ross County district
- In office 1803–1803
- Preceded by: New district
- Succeeded by: William Creighton, Jr. James Dunlap; John Evans; Elias Langham
- In office 1807–1808
- Preceded by: James Dunlap; Nathaniel Massie; David Shelby; Abraham J. Williams
- Succeeded by: District eliminated
- In office 1821–1823
- Preceded by: John Bailhache; John Entrekin; William Vance
- Succeeded by: George Nashee; Allison C. Looker; Edward King
- In office 1824–1825
- Preceded by: George Nashee; Allison C. Looker; Edward King
- Succeeded by: Isaac Cook; Edward King

Personal details
- Born: July 16, 1773 near Charles Town, Colony of Virginia, British America (now Charles Town, West Virginia)
- Died: June 20, 1827 (aged 53) New York City, U.S.
- Party: Democratic-Republican
- Relatives: Jane T. Worthington (daughter-in-law)
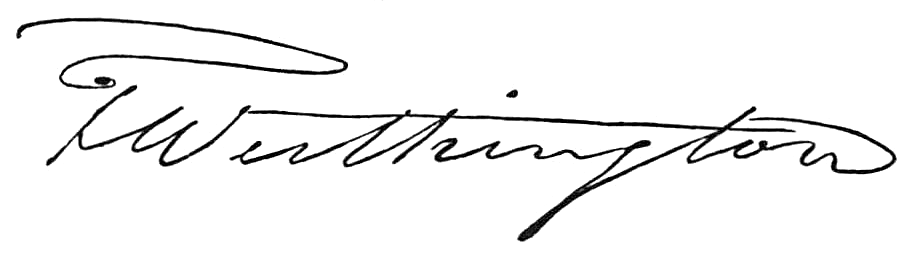
- Signature

Thomas Worthington (July 16, 1773 – June 20, 1827) was an American politician who served as the sixth governor of Ohio.

== Early life ==
Worthington was born in Berkeley County near Charles Town in the Colony of Virginia. In 1796, he married a Virginia woman, Eleanor Swearingen, who joined him in emigrating to Ross County, Ohio, where they emancipated their slaves. Worthington was of English descent, and his ancestors were loyalists during the reign of King Charles. The home they eventually built just outside Chillicothe was called Adena and is the namesake of the Adena culture. The first of their ten children, daughter Mary, married David Macomb, a future leader of the Texas Revolution. A son, also Thomas, graduated from West Point in 1827, held the rank of Brigadier General in the Ohio Militia, and later fought in the Mexican-American War and Civil War.

== Career ==
He served in the Territorial House of Representatives from 1799 to 1803 and served as a Ross county delegate to the State Constitutional Convention in 1802. He was a leader of the Chillicothe Junto, a group of Chillicothe Democratic-Republican politicians who brought about the admission of Ohio as a state in 1803 and largely controlled its politics for some years thereafter. Among his colleagues in the faction were Nathaniel Massie and Edward Tiffin.

Worthington was elected one of Ohio's first Senators in 1803, serving until 1807. He was returned to the Senate in December 1810 upon the resignation of Return J. Meigs, Jr. and served until December 1814, when he resigned after winning election to the governorship. On June 17, 1812, he voted "No" on the resolution to declare war on Britain, but the vote in favor of war was 19 to 13. He won re-election as governor two years later, moving the state capital from Chillicothe to Columbus. Worthington did not seek re-election in 1818.

He platted what would become the city of Logan, Ohio in 1816.

In January 1819, when the election was held to replace the retiring Jeremiah Morrow in the Senate, he held the lead through the first three ballots, only losing when factions aligned behind William A. Trimble on the fourth and final ballot. He narrowly lost a bid for a partial term in the Senate in 1821, losing to the incumbent governor, Ethan Allen Brown, and so he instead returned to the Ohio House of Representatives.

After being the runner-up in the 1808 and 1810 gubernatorial elections, he won the 1814 and 1816 elections by landslide margins. Both times he nearly reached three-quarters of the vote. After two terms he stepped down as governor.

== Death ==
Worthington was initially buried at his estate in Adena, and was later interred at Grandview Cemetery, Chillicothe, Ross County, Ohio.

== Legacy ==
Worthington is a member of the Ohio Hall Of Fame. The city of Worthington, Ohio, was named in Worthington's honor, as was Thomas Worthington High School.

Worthington is known as the "Father of the Ohio statehood".

== Sources ==
- United States Congress. "Thomas Worthington (id: W000750)". Biographical Directory of the United States Congress.
- A New Nation Votes: American Election Returns, 1787–1825
- Sears, Alfred Byron, Thomas Worthington, father of Ohio statehood, Ohio State University Press for the Ohio Historical Society, Columbus, OH [1958] Full text here Archived March 4, 2016, at the Wayback Machine

Political offices
Preceded by Othniel Looker	Governor of Ohio; 1814–1818	Succeeded by Ethan Allen Brown
Assembly seats
New district	Member of the Northwest Territory House of Representatives from Ross County; 1799–1802; Served alongside: Elias Langham, Nathaniel Massie, Edward Tiffin	Ohio statehood
Political offices
Preceded by	Delegate to 1802 Ohio Constitutional Convention from Ross County; November 1–29, 1802; Served alongside: James Grubb; Nathaniel Massie; Edward Tiffin; Michael Baldwin	Succeeded by
Ohio House of Representatives
New district	Representative from Ross County; 1803; Served alongside: Michael Baldwin, Robert Culbertson, William Patton	Succeeded by William Creighton Sr. James Dunlap; John Evans; Elias Langham as Representatives from Ross and Franklin Counties
Preceded by James Dunlap; Nathaniel Massie; David Shelby; Abraham J. Williams	Representative from Ross, Franklin, and Highland Counties; 1807–1808; Served alongside: Elias Langham, William Lewis, Jeremiah McLene	District eliminated
Preceded by John Bailhache; John Entrekin; William Vance	Representative from Ross County; 1821–1823; Served alongside: 1821–1822: Archibald McLean, William Vance; 1822–1823: Allison C. Looker, Anthony Walke	Succeeded by Edward King; Allison C. Looker; George Nashee
Preceded by Edward King; Allison C. Looker; George Nashee	Representative from Ross County; 1824–1825; Served alongside: Isaac Cook	Succeeded by Isaac Cook; Edward King
U.S. Senate
Preceded by None	U.S. senator (Class 3) from Ohio; April 1, 1803 – March 3, 1807; Served alongside: John Smith	Succeeded by Edward Tiffin
Preceded by Return J. Meigs Jr.	U.S. senator (Class 1) from Ohio; December 15, 1810 – December 1, 1814; Served alongside: Alexander Campbell, Jeremiah Morrow	Succeeded by Joseph Kerr
Military offices
Preceded by David Ziegler	Adjutant General of Ohio; 1807–1809	Succeeded by Joseph Kerr
Preceded by Isaac Van Horne	Adjutant General of Ohio; 1811–1812	Succeeded by Isaac Van Horne
