= Woodhill Cemetery =

Historic graveyard in Franklin, Ohio

Coordinates: 39.5467°N 84.3203°W

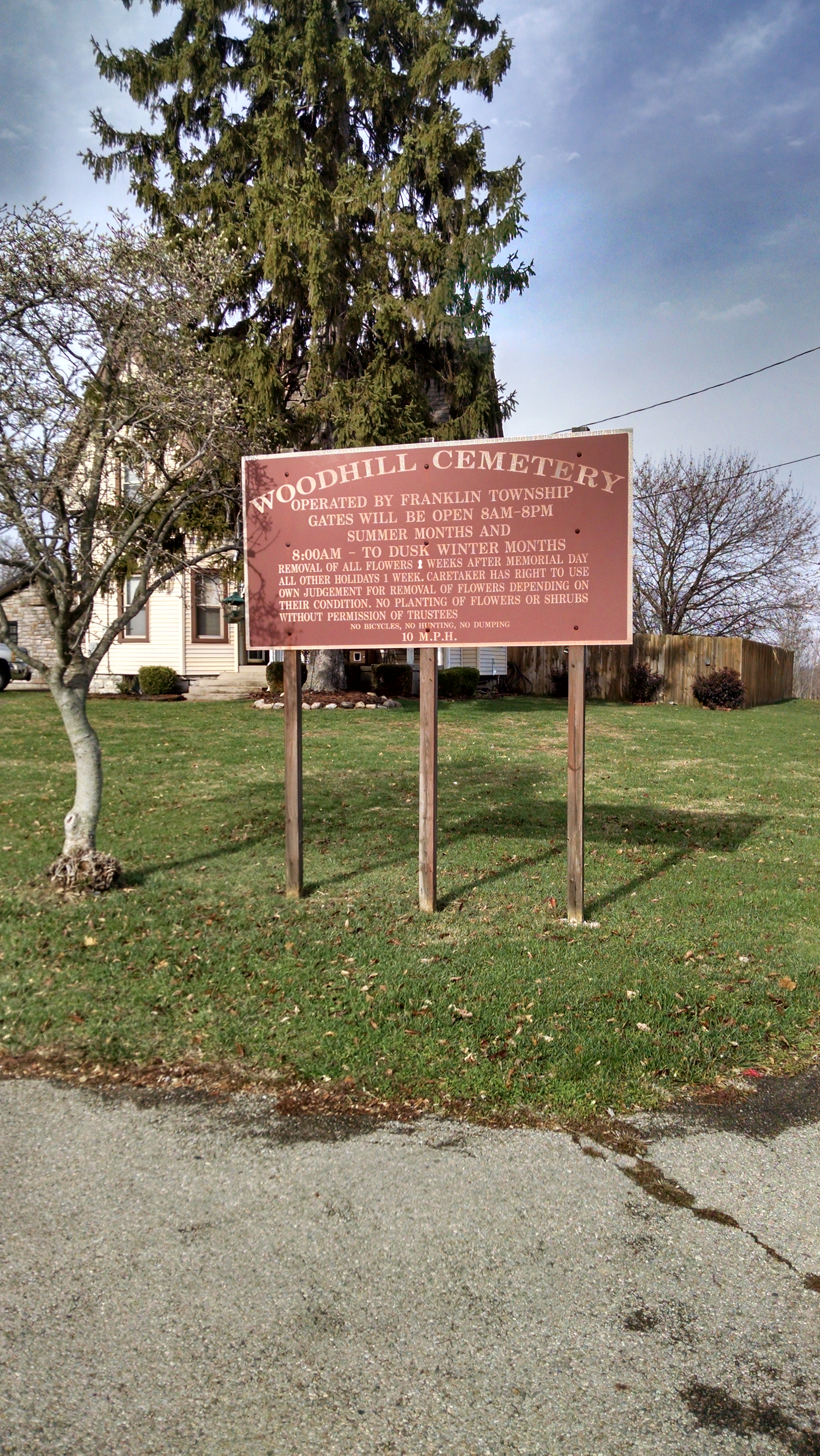
The entrance sign to Woodhill Cemetery.

Woodhill Cemetery is a historic cemetery located in Franklin, Ohio. It is publicly owned and operated by the Franklin Township Department of Public Works.

== Origins ==
Woodhill Cemetery is believed to have originated in its current spot in the 1850s when the townspeople of Franklin sought a location for a new cemetery outside of downtown. They decided upon a hill near Clear Creek which overlooked the town called Wood Hill. Franklin Township took over operations around the year 1882. The cemetery is spread out over 100 acres, which include two large mausoleums, war memorials, and many old-growth deciduous trees.

== Notable burials ==
- Edwin F. Harding
- Justin Woodward Harding
- John Patterson MacLean
- John N. C. Schenck
- William Cortenus Schenck
