= Eden Thirkfield Home =

Coordinates: 39°33′38.5″N 84°18′18″W

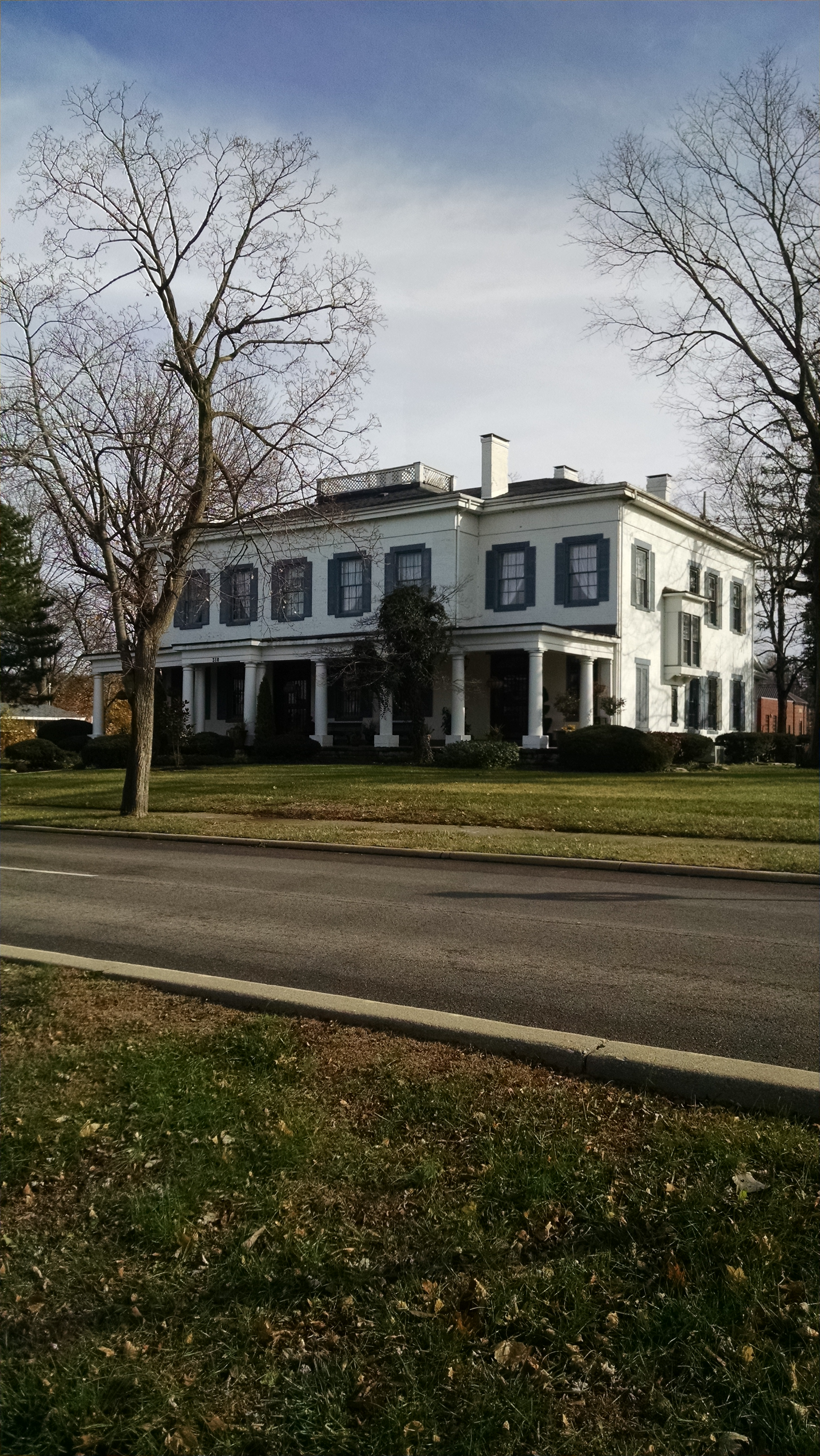
The Eden Thirkfield home in downtown Franklin (2015)

The Eden Thirkfield Home is a historic Greek Revival mansion in downtown Franklin, Ohio. It was said to have been built in 1848 for a riverboat captain, Henry C. Storms. He sold the house to Eden B. Thirkfield, a prominent merchant in the town, who willed it to his two children. Eden's son, Wilbur P. Thirkield, lived in the home following his father's death.
