= Justin Woodward Harding =

American lawyer and judge (1888–1976)

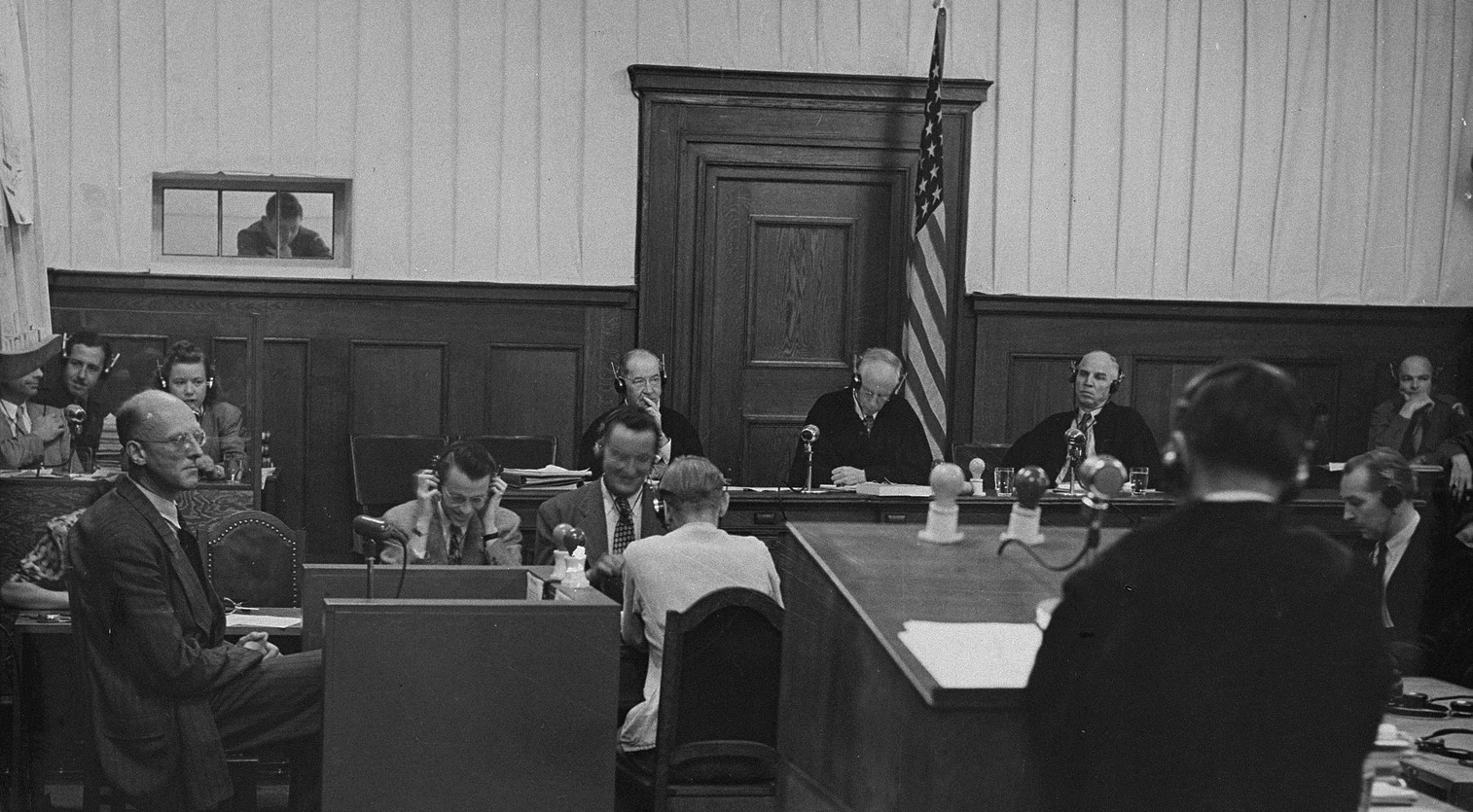
A scene from the Judges' Trials.

Justin Woodward Harding (1888–1976) was a former lawyer, judge, and member of the Bar of the state of Ohio. He was an alternate judge at the Judges' Trial, part of the massive Nuremberg Trials.

== Life ==
Judge Harding was born in 1888 in Franklin, Ohio son to Clarence Henry (Larry) Harding, the manager of the Harding Paper division of the American Writing Paper Company. He attended Franklin High School (Ohio) and graduated in 1906. After leaving Franklin he attended law school at the University of Michigan, graduating in 1914. He was married to May Gaynor (b.1888-d.1976). They had two children, Cam Harding (formerly Mary Campbell Harding) and a son, Justin Woodward Harding Jr.

He died in 1976 and was buried in Woodhill Cemetery in Franklin Township, Warren County, Ohio. His childhood home, now The Harding Museum (home of the Franklin Area Historical Society), still stands in the historic Mackinaw District in Franklin. He is the younger brother of Edwin F. Harding.

== Judges' trial ==
Following indictments on sixteen different Nazi jurors and lawyers, Harding was selected as an alternate judge during the trials. The indictments were formally presented on January 4, 1947. On June 19, 1947 Carrington T. Marshall, the presiding judge, retired due to illness. Judge Harding then became a full member of the tribunal when Judge James T. Brand was appointed to fill Judge Marshall's position. The trials officially concluded on December 4, 1947. His role in the trial is personified in the 1961 American film Judgment at Nuremberg.
