= Franklin Junior High School =

High school in Ohio, United States

Coordinates: 39°33′18.2″N 84°18′07.8″W

Franklin Junior High School was a public middle school in Franklin, Ohio, part of the Franklin City School District. The building was constructed in 1921 for grades 6-12. In 1948 the building became a four-year high school until 1954, when the Hampton Bennett School was opened. It remained a high school (grades 10-12) until 1969, when Franklin High School (Franklin, Ohio) was built. The building then became Franklin Junior High School housing grades 7 and 8. It has since been torn down, with the previously mentioned High School taking its place as a Junior High School.
