= Frederick K. Engle =

United States Navy admiral (1797–1868)

- Born: October 24, 1797; Chester, Pennsylvania, U.S.
- Died: February 12, 1868 (aged 70); Philadelphia, Pennsylvania, U.S.
- Military career
- Allegiance: United States
- Branch: United States Navy
- Service years: 1814–1866
- Rank: Rear admiral
- Units: USS Princeton; USS Wabash
- Conflicts: Mexican–American War Cochinchina Campaign: Bombardment of Qui Nhơn; American Civil War

Frederick K. Engle (October 24, 1797 – February 12, 1868) was a rear admiral of the United States Navy.

== Early life and career ==
Engle was born in Chester, Pennsylvania. He entered the navy as a midshipman on November 30, 1814, and became lieutenant on January 13, 1825. During the Mexican–American War he commanded the Princeton.

He was promoted to captain on September 14, 1855, and commanded the Wabash, flagship of the Home Squadron, from 1856 until 1858.

At the beginning of the Civil War he was sent to China to bring home the Hartford, then served in the Union blockading squadron. He was then assigned to the command of the Philadelphia Naval Shipyard, and subsequently became governor of the naval asylum in that City. He was promoted to rear admiral on the retired list on July 25, 1866.

Engle died in Philadelphia on February 12, 1868. He is buried at St. Mary's Episcopal Church in Burlington, NJ.

== Notes ==
Military offices
Preceded by Cornelius Stribling	Commander, East India Squadron; 23 July 1861 – 23 September 1862	Succeeded by Cicero Price
