= Hiram Bell =

American politician (1808–1855)

Member of the U.S. House of Representatives from Ohio's 3rd district
- In office March 4, 1851 – March 3, 1853
- Preceded by: Robert C. Schenck
- Succeeded by: Lewis D. Campbell

Member of the Ohio House of Representatives
- In office 1836; 1837; 1840

Personal details
- Born: April 22, 1808 Salem, Vermont, US
- Died: December 21, 1855 (aged 47) Greenville, Ohio, US
- Resting place: Greenville Cemetery
- Party: Whig

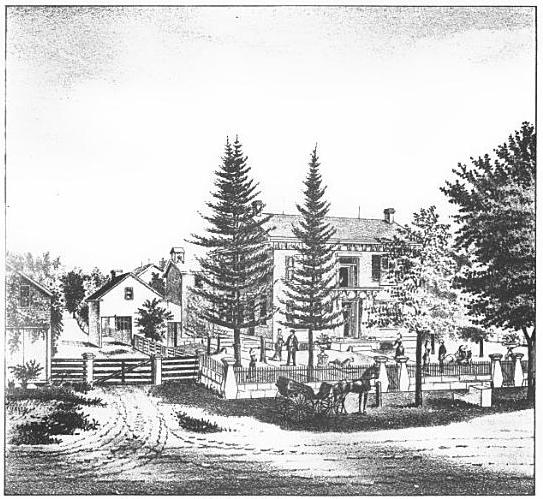
Artist's impression of the Hiram Bell Farmstead, located at 43628 State Route 517 in Fairfield Township, Columbiana County, Ohio, United States, south of the city of Columbiana. Built in 1850, the house and adjoining buildings are listed as a historic district on the National Register of Historic Places.

Hiram Bell (April 22, 1808 – December 21, 1855) was a 19th-century American lawyer and politician who was a U.S. representative from Ohio's Third Congressional District from for one term from 1851 to 1853.

== Biography ==
Bell was born in Salem (now Derby), Vermont, and attended the public schools of his native town. In 1826, his parents moved the family to Hamilton, Ohio. There he studied law and was admitted to the bar in 1829, when he commenced practice in Greenville, Ohio. Hiram Bell married Lusina Clark in Darke County on July 25, 1832; they had two children.

In 1829 and 1834 he was elected auditor of Darke County, Ohio. He served three terms in the Ohio house of representatives in 1836, 1837, and 1840.

=== Congress ===
In 1850, he ran successfully for Congress as a Whig from the third district. After the redistricting following the 1850 census, he did not stand for re-election in the new district in 1852.

=== Later career and death ===
He engaged in the practice of law in Greenville where he died a few years later, aged 47. He is interred in the Greenville Cemetery.

== Sources ==
- United States Congress. "Hiram Bell (id: B000335)". Biographical Directory of the United States Congress.

U.S. House of Representatives
Preceded by Robert C. Schenck	Member of the U.S. House of Representatives from Ohio's 3rd congressional district March 4, 1851 - March 3, 1853	Succeeded by Lewis D. Campbell
Ohio House of Representatives
Preceded by Stacy Taylor	Representative from Darke & other counties December 3, 1836-December 2, 1838; Served alongside: Stacy Taylor	Succeeded by Justin Hamilton; John Briggs
Preceded by Thomas Shideler; M. Purviance	Representative from Darke & other counties December 7, 1840-December 5, 1841; Served alongside: John Brown; Justin Hamilton	Succeeded by Justin Hamilton; I. N. Guard; Joseph S. Updegraff
