= Mary Kennedy Carter =

American teacher (1934–2010)

Mary Kennedy Carter (January 13, 1934 – December 14, 2010) was a social studies teacher and civil rights activist in Ohio, United States. She took part in creating the award-winning curriculum "New York and Slavery: Complicity and Resistance". She was the wife of Donald W. Carter and mother of Keith B. Carter.

== Early life ==
Mary Kennedy Carter was born Mary Kennedy in Franklin, Ohio, as the daughter of a barber and a teacher, the youngest of nine children. As a child she grew up in a part of Ohio, where racism was pervasive. As a child she had both black and white friends, but in the process of growing up racial segregation became more clear. At one point in her teens she became valedictorian of her class, but due to a race rule she was not proclaimed that. Instead, the teacher published 3 salutatorians in her place.

Racial segregation for Mary also became apparent in that she couldn't use places to go out for entertainment unrestricted, like restaurants, swimming pools, the skate rink or the movie theatre.

== College and early career ==
Unusual for their time and place was that Mary and all of her siblings got into college. She herself attended Ohio State University to study to become an elementary school teacher (she earned her bachelor’s degree in elementary education and history). After teaching for several years in predominantly white elementary schools in Dayton, Ohio, California and San Diego, Mary received a teacher's fellowship at Teachers College, Columbia University in New York City.

This fellowship allowed her to travel to Uganda to teach at a teacher preparation college there. She was very thrilled to return to the continent of her ancestors, to learn from her heritage and be part of a majority, as she described it. There she also came into contact with presidents and officials of African countries. However she denied the request to stay in Uganda and returned to the United States.

== Activism ==
When back in the United States, Mary moved to New York City to work for McGraw-Hill publishers as editor and writer. There she met her husband Donald Carter. She left McGraw-Hill for the opportunity to create a module of Black History at the Roosevelt school district, Long Island. In that period she managed to get many important speakers to the school district, including Jackie Robinson and Betty Shabazz.

After teaching and creating awareness at the Roosevelt school district, she went on to teach in Rockville Center, and went so far as to create the after-school clubs 'PINK' and 'BLUE' to promote diversity, multiculturalism and anti-violence. Mary Kennedy Carter was a preacher amongst students and teachers for equality and diversity everywhere she came.

After retiring, Mary became a field supervisor and adjunct professor at Hofstra working with student teachers. She became part of a team developing and field-testing the 'New York and Slavery: Complicity and Resistance' curriculum that was developed with the support of the New York State Council for the Social Studies. In 2005, the curriculum won the Program of Excellence Award from the National Council for the Social Studies.

In later years, Mary Kennedy Carter was a member of the New York State Amistad Commission, which was established by the State Legislature to research the best way issues of race can be taught in America's History classrooms.

At the end of her career, Mary became the historian for her house of worship in Roosevelt, New York and a teacher educator at Hofstra University in Long Island. She supervised student teachers and taught social studies methods and educational issues classes. Most of her students were white and were raised in largely white suburban communities. A major focus of her classes was helping them to recognize the importance of diversity.

== Writings ==
In 1970 Mary Kennedy Carter wrote the book 'On to freedom', a short 55 page book about a slave family planning to escape slavery. Furthermore, Mary contributed to some editions of 'Race, Class, and Gender in the United States: An Integrated Study'.
