= Bombardment of Qui Nhơn =

1861 US Navy attack in Vietnam

- Part of the Cochinchina Campaign
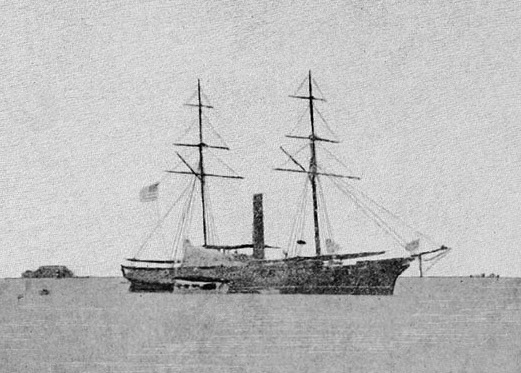
- USS Saginaw at the Mare Island naval yard
Date	July 31, 1861
Location	Qui Nhơn, Vietnam
Result	American victory
Territorial changes	Vietnamese-held fort destroyed

Belligerents
United States	Đại Nam under the Nguyễn dynasty

Commanders and leaders
(United States) James F. Schenck (United States) Frederick K. Engle	Unknown

Strength
1 sloop-of-war	~1 artillery piece 1 fort

Casualties and losses
None	Unknown; 1 fort destroyed

The bombardment of Qui Nhơn in 1861 was an attack by a United States Navy warship upon a Vietnamese-held fort protecting Qui Nhơn on the south central coast of Vietnam (modern-day Binh Dinh Province). United States forces under James F. Schenck went to southern Vietnam to search for missing American citizens but were met with cannon fire upon arriving. In response to the attack the American warship bombarded the fort until it was reduced. The incident occurred during French and Spanish conquest of southern Vietnam.

== Bombardment ==
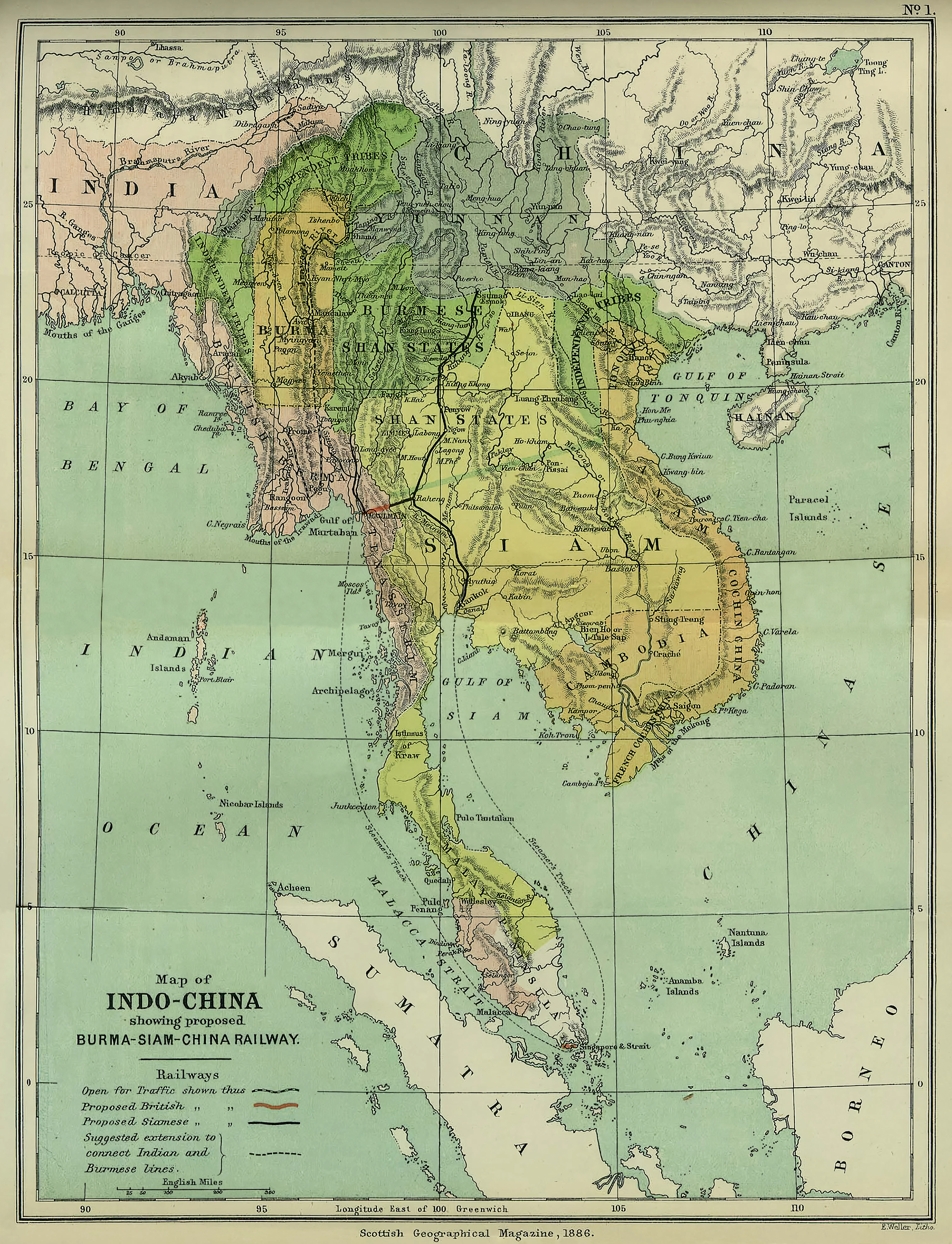
An 1886 map of Asia, Qui Nhơn is along the central coast of Vietnam.

Commander John Schenck was serving with the East India Squadron in June 1861 just before setting sail east to join the West Gulf Blockading Squadron. His last mission in the Far East was to proceed with the paddle steamer sloop USS Saginaw to Qui Nhơn. A boat filled with sailors from the American merchant ship Myrtle was reported missing so Flag Officer Frederick K. Engle ordered Schenck to search the area. The Saginaw was armed with one 50-pounder (23 kg), one 32-pounder (15 kg) and two 24-pound rifled guns. She had a complement of fifty officers and enlisted men. Commander Schenck arrived off Qui Nhơn of July 30 and prepared to enter the harbor the following day at 1:00 am. He wanted to ask the Vietnamese if they had seen the missing sailors. When the Saginaw was entering the harbor of Qui Nhơn on July 31, the nearby fort to the north, mounting a few guns, opened fire at a range of 600 yards.

USS Saginaw's crew was just putting the anchor down when the first shot burst in the water next to the ship. Surprised, the Americans first raised a white flag to show their friendly intentions but then a second shot was fired along with a third. Trying to get up steam, the Saginaw turned around and withdrew slowly to 900 yards, by which time her crew were at station and ready for action. The American gunners returned fire with one of their 32-pounders and after only about twenty minutes the Vietnamese guns were silenced. A secondary explosion was observed and it was suspected that either the powder magazine of the fort, or one of the guns, blew up and killed their operators. After the explosion no further shots were fired from the fort. However, the Saginaw's gunners continued their bombardment for another half-hour unopposed until the fort was in ruins. American forces suffered no damage or casualties and after the action, communicating with the Vietnamese proved fruitless so the Saginaw steamed back to Hong Kong.

The men of Saginaw ultimately did not find the missing American sailors. Commander Schenck went on to serve with distinction at the first and second battle for Fort Fisher during the American Civil War.

== See also ==
- Bombardment of San Juan del Norte
