= James F. Schenck =

James Findlay Schenck
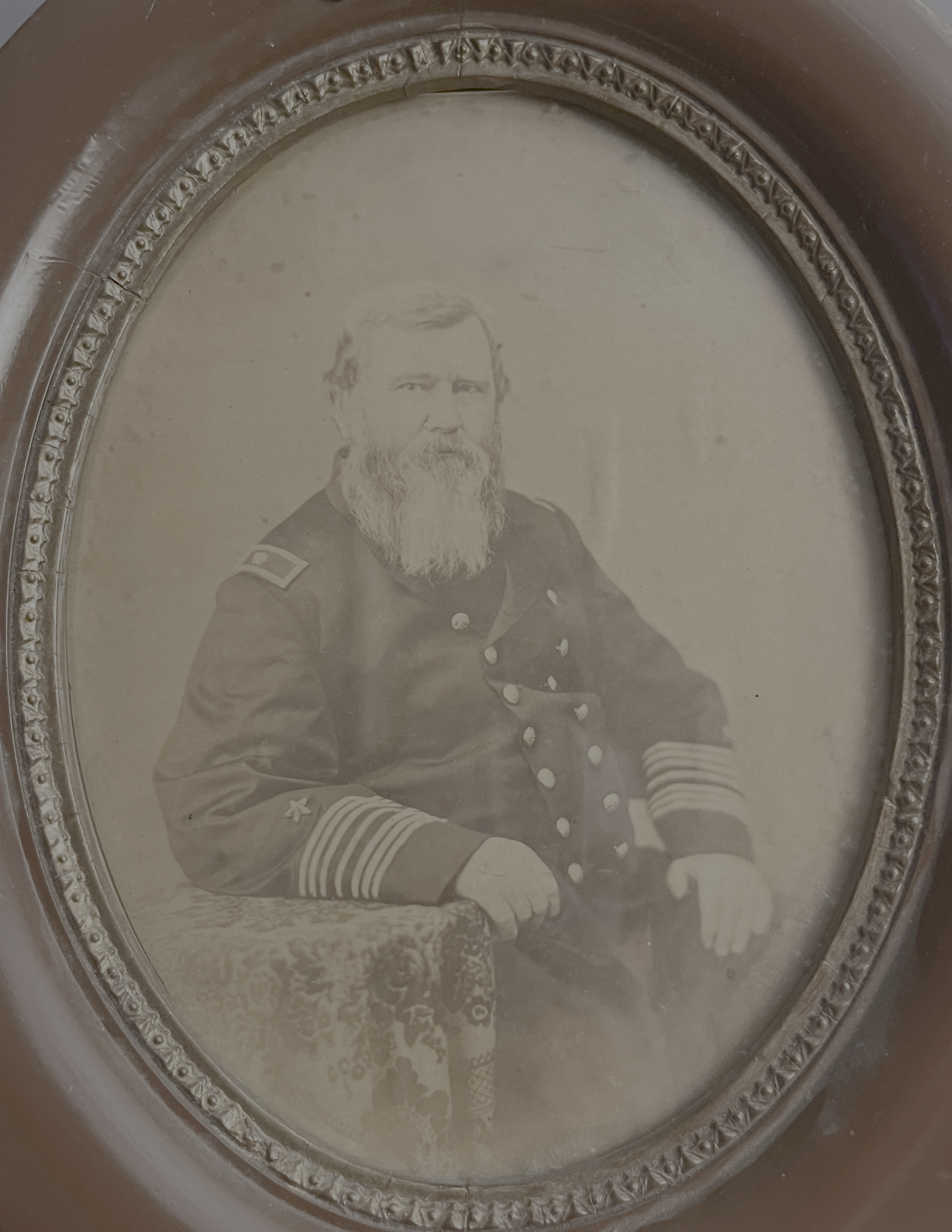
- Naval portrait of United States Naval Rear Admiral James F. Schenck
- Born: June 11, 1807; Franklin, Ohio
- Died: December 21, 1882 (aged 75); Dayton, Ohio
- Burial place: Woodland Cemetery, Dayton, Ohio
- Relatives: Robert C. Schenck (brother)
- Military career
- Allegiance: United States of America
- Branch: United States Navy
- Service years: 1825–1869
- Rank: Rear admiral
- Commands: Saginaw; St. Lawrence; Powhatan
- Conflicts: Mexican–American War Cochinchina Campaign: Bombardment of Qui Nhơn; American Civil War

James Findlay Schenck (June 11, 1807 – December 21, 1882) was a rear admiral in the United States Navy who served in the Mexican–American War and the American Civil War. His younger brother, Robert C. Schenck, was a Union Army general and a United States Ambassador to Brazil.

== Biography ==
Born in Franklin, Ohio, he was the son of William C. Schenck, the founder of Franklin. He entered West Point as a cadet in the class of 1826, but left before graduation. Schenck was appointed midshipman in the United States Navy in 1825, and later promoted to lieutenant. During the Mexican–American War, he served under Commodore Stockton in the Conquest of California. In 1846, Schenck planted American victory flags at Santa Barbara, San Pedro and Pueblo de Los Angeles, claiming the areas as United States territory.

In 1862, Schenck was given command of St. Lawrence in the West Gulf Blockading Squadron. Schenck also commanded Powhatan and the 3rd Division of Admiral David Dixon Porter's fleet in operations against Fort Fisher, and was mentioned for gallantry in Admiral Porter's action report. He was later promoted to rear admiral on September 21, 1868, and retired on June 11, 1869.

Rear Admiral Schenck died at Dayton, Ohio, and is interred in the Woodland Cemetery in Dayton.

== Namesake ==
- The destroyer USS Schenck (DD-159) (1919–1946) was named for him.
