= Franklin Post Office =

- Old Log Post Office
- U.S. National Register of Historic Places
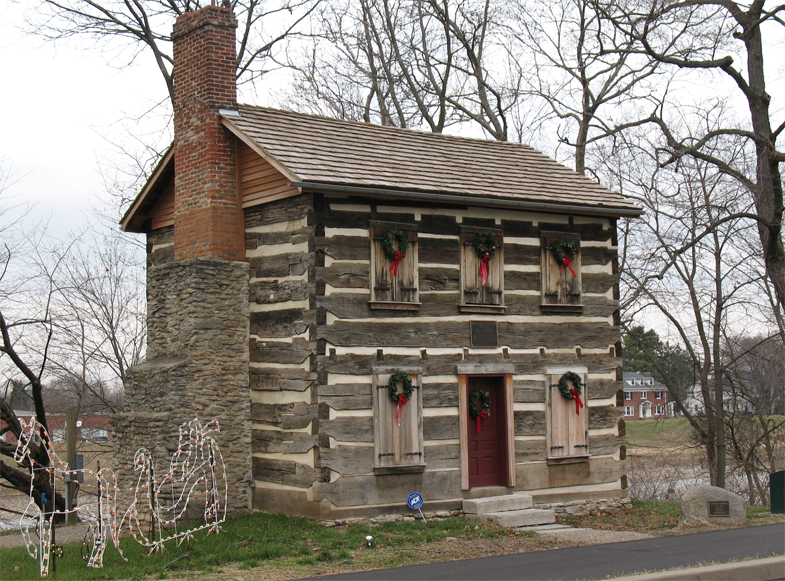
- Old Log Post Office on December 17, 2006

- Location within Ohio Location within the United States
- Location: Franklin, Ohio
- Coordinates: 39°33′34″N 84°18′24″W
- Built: 1802
- NRHP reference No.: 76001541
- Added to NRHP: March 17, 1976

The Old Log Post Office, also known as the Franklin Post Office, is an historic building located in Franklin, Ohio. Built in 1802, the two-story log cabin is the oldest surviving post office in the state and the oldest building in Franklin.

On April 1, 1805, President Thomas Jefferson appointed the first postmaster, John N. C. Schenck. The post office was his home. It was originally at 310 River Street but was moved to its present site near the corner of 5th and River streets in 1974. A portion of the Great Miami River Recreation Trail, a bicycle trail, now passes by the post office.

On March 17, 1976, it was added to the National Register of Historic Places.

== See also ==
- List of Registered Historic Places in Warren County, Ohio
