= Franklin City School District, Warren County, Ohio =

School district in Ohio

Coordinates: 39°33′41″N 84°18′6″W

Franklin City School District
- 754 East Fourth Street Franklin, Ohio, Warren County, 45005

District information
- Type: Public
- Grades: Pre-K–12
- Superintendent: Michael Sander
- Asst. superintendent(s): Robyn Donisi
- School board: Franklin City School Board
- Schools: 6
- NCES District ID: 3904400
- District ID: OH-044008

Students and staff
- Athletic conference: OHSAA
- Colors

Other information
- Website: www.franklincityschools.com//

Franklin City School District (commonly known as Franklin City Schools) is a public school district located in Franklin, Ohio. The school district serves the city of Franklin and parts of Franklin Township in Warren County. The district includes six schools, providing education from pre-kindergarten through 12th grade.

The school district’s general offices are located at 754 E 4th Street in Franklin. The superintendent is Michael Sander.

== Schools in District ==
- Franklin High School - Grades 9-12
- Franklin Junior High School - Grades 6-8
- Intermediate Campus - Grades 3 - 5
- Hunter Elementary School - Grade 2
- Gerke Elementary School - Grade 1
- Schenck Elementary School - Grades Pre K - Kindergarten
