= USS Schenck =

Wickes-class destroyer

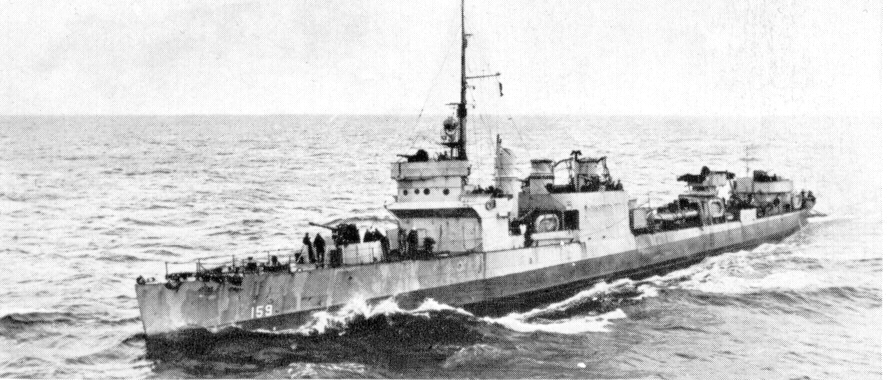
- USS Schenk underway

History

United States
- Name: Schenk
- Namesake: James F. Schenck
- Builder: New York Shipbuilding Corporation, Camden, New Jersey
- Laid down: 26 March 1918
- Launched: 23 April 1919
- Commissioned: 30 October 1919
- Decommissioned: 9 June 1922
- Recommissioned: 1 May 1930
- Reclassified: Miscellaneous auxiliary, AG-82, 25 September 1944
- Decommissioned: 17 May 1946
- Reclassified: AG-82, 25 September 1944
- Stricken: 5 June 1946
- Fate: Sold for scrapping 25 November 1946

General characteristics
- Class & type: Wickes-class destroyer
- Displacement: 1,211 tons
- Length: 314 ft 5 in (95.8 m)
- Beam: 31 ft (9.4 m)
- Draft: 9 ft 4 in (2.8 m)
- Speed: 35 knots (65 km/h)
- Complement: 122 officers and enlisted
- Armament: 4 × 4 in (102 mm)/50 guns; 1 × 3 in (76 mm)/23 guns; 12 × 21 in (533 mm) torpedo tubes

USS Schenck (DD-159) was a Wickes-class destroyer in the United States Navy during World War II. She was named for Rear Admiral James F. Schenck, USN (1807–1882).

== Construction and commissioning ==
Schenck was laid down by the New York Shipbuilding Corporation at Camden in New Jersey on 26 March 1918, launched on 23 April 1919, sponsored by Miss Mary Janet Earle and commissioned on 30 October 1919.

== Service history ==
Schenck was attached to the US Atlantic Fleet and, after shakedown, operated between New York and Chesapeake Bay. Between July and September 1920, she patrolled off the east coast of Mexico; and, in early 1921, she participated in fleet exercises in the Caribbean Sea. Her crew was reduced to 50% of her authorized complement at Charleston, South Carolina, on 7 November 1921; and she was decommissioned at Philadelphia on 9 June 1922.

Schenck was recommissioned on 1 May 1930, and trained reservists during the summer. In January 1931, she joined the fleet in the Caribbean for Fleet Problem XII and, the following year, also participated in Fleet Problem XIII off Hawaii. Due to the increased tension in the Far East resulting from Japanese military action in Manchuria and at Shanghai, China, she remained in the Pacific Ocean with the Scouting Fleet until June 1932. Schenck again returned to the Pacific in February 1933 for Fleet Problem XIV and remained there until April 1934, when she re-entered the Caribbean for more fleet exercises. Then, with intervening periods of overhaul and rotating reserve at Norfolk, Virginia Schenck trained naval reservists and Naval Academy midshipmen in cruises along the Atlantic and Gulf coasts from May 1935 until the outbreak of war in Europe.

=== World War II ===
On 9 September 1939, Schenck commenced Neutrality Patrol duty off the east coast; and, after overhaul, moved to Key West for further patrols. During the summer of 1940, she made two midshipman cruises from Annapolis. She then carried out more patrols in the Caribbean, between 22 August and 8 December 1940, between 15 January and 18 March 1941, and between 27 June and 14 July 1941. Training and repairs filled intervals between her patrols.

On 15 September 1941, Schenck arrived at Naval Station Argentia, Newfoundland, for duty escorting convoys carrying vital materiel to England. She left Argentia with her first convoy on 29 September; and when the United States entered World War II, the destroyer had escorted two convoys to a guarded rendezvous with British escorts off Iceland and escorted a ship back to Argentia. She remained on the convoy route between Argentia and Iceland until April 1943, fighting heavy weather and German submarines. During two long periods, 19 February to 9 May 1942 and 18 August 1942 to 23 March 1943, she was based in Iceland escorting convoys in and out of Icelandic ports. Twice her convoy was attacked; on 15 August 1942, and from 6 to 8 February 1943. The weather also took its toll, frequently causing minor structural damage to the old ship; and, on 13 March 1943, a gale caused her to drag anchor and collide with SS Exterminator in an Icelandic port. Schenck was then sent to Boston for repairs.

=== North Atlantic convoys escorted ===
Convoy	Escort Group	Dates	Notes
HX 152		30 Sept − 9 Oct 1941	from Newfoundland to Iceland prior to US declaration of war
ON 26		20−29 Oct 1941	from Iceland to Newfoundland prior to US declaration of war
ON 28		31 Oct − 3 Nov 1941	from Iceland to Newfoundland prior to US declaration of war
HX 160		17−25 Nov 1941	from Newfoundland to Iceland prior to US declaration of war
ON 41		4−14 Dec 1941	from Iceland to Newfoundland; war declared while escorting convoy
HX 167		29 Dec 1941 − 7 Jan 1942	from Newfoundland to Iceland
ON 55		15−19 Jan 1942	from Iceland to Newfoundland
HX 174		2−16 Feb 1942	from Newfoundland to Iceland
SC 71		5 March 1942	Iceland shuttle
SC 73		17 March 1942	Iceland shuttle
SC 75		24 March 1942	Iceland shuttle
SC 77		11–14 April 1942	Iceland shuttle
ON 89		23–29 April 1942	from Iceland to Newfoundland
ON 90		2–5 May 1942	from Newfoundland to United States
SC 95	MOEF group A3	8−14 Aug 1942	from Newfoundland to Iceland
SC 97		29 Aug − 1 Sept 1942	Iceland shuttle
SC 99		15 Sept 1942	Iceland shuttle
ON 136		5−9 Oct 1942	Iceland shuttle
SC 103		10 Oct 1942	Iceland shuttle
Convoy SC 107		5−7 Nov 1942	Iceland shuttle
SC 110		29 Nov − 2 Dec 1942	Iceland shuttle
SC 112		19−21 Dec 1942	Iceland shuttle
ON 156		25−30 Dec 1942	Iceland shuttle
SC 114			Iceland shuttle
SC 116		16−22 Jan 1943	Iceland shuttle
Convoy SC 118		6−9 Feb 1943	Iceland shuttle
HX 226		19−20 Feb 1943	Iceland shuttle
SC 120		26 Feb 1943	Iceland shuttle

=== Mid-Atlantic ===
Reassigned to more southerly routes, Schenck resumed convoy escort duties on 28 April 1943, and, during the summer, escorted convoys between east coast ports, the Caribbean, and North Africa. She returned to Chesapeake Bay with a convoy on 26 October 1943, and, after overhaul and training, joined a hunter-killer group built around the escort carrier Card. The group conducted patrols against enemy submarines near the Azores between 24 November 1943 and 2 January 1944. The high point of Schenck' war service came on 24 December 1943, when the group located a concentration of U-boats. After stalking radar and sound contacts for most of the night and making six attacks, Schenck heard an underwater explosion and saw an oil slick which marked the end of U-645. Almost immediately, another submarine sank Schenck's squadronmate, Leary. Schenck continued her ASW operations and was later commended by the task group commander for her role in preventing a concentrated wolf pack attack on Card; for her continued aggressive action after the sinking of Leary, despite having only fourteen depth charges left; and for her skillful rescue of Leary's survivors.

In February and March 1944, Schenck made one more round-trip convoy voyage from the east coast to Casablanca, and, between 17 April and 10 June, she escorted Antaeus on troop-carrying voyages along the east coast. Between 10 July and 29 August, she provided training services for submarines at Bermuda and then entered the Brooklyn Navy Yard where she was stripped of her armament. Subsequently, she was assigned for duty under Commander, Air Force, Atlantic Fleet, as a torpedo target ship for aircraft. Reclassified AG-82 effective 25 September 1944, she provided target services for student pilots off Quonset Point, Rhode Island, until the end of the war. This service is not without its dangers. The ship was twice holed by exercise torpedoes which failed to run at set depth and once struck by a low-flying aircraft. Schenck was decommissioned at the Boston Naval Shipyard on 17 May 1946, stricken from the Naval Vessel Register on 5 June 1946 and sold for scrap to the Boston Metals Company at Baltimore in Maryland on 25 November 1946.

== Awards ==
Schenck received one battle star for her World War II service.

== Bibliography ==
- Wright, Christopher C. (1986). "The U.S. Fleet at the New York World's Fair, 1939: Some Photographs from the Collection of the Late William H. Davis". Warship International. XXIII (3): 273–285. ISSN 0043-0374.
