= Robert C. Schenck =

American politician (1809–1890)

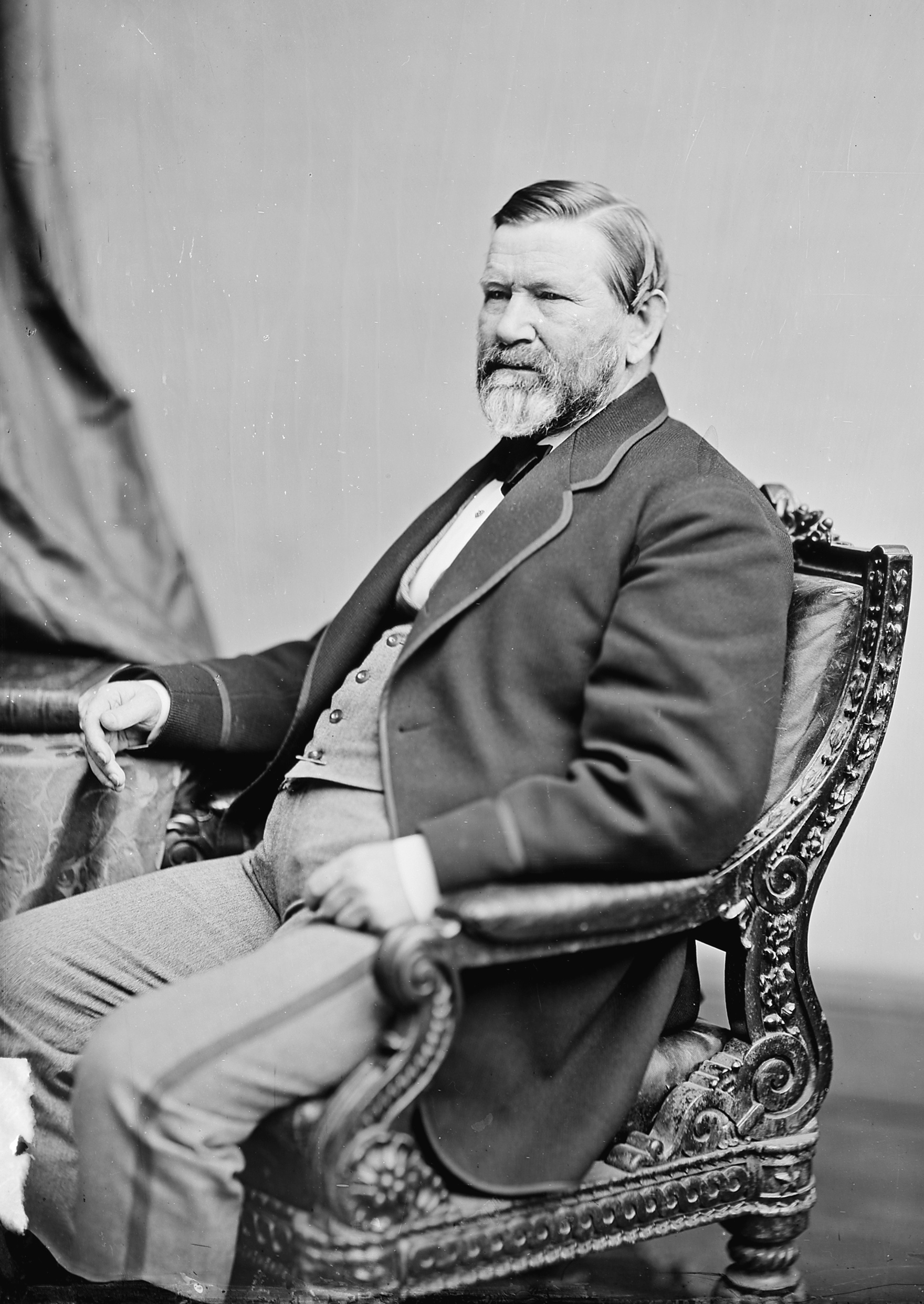
- Schenck c. 1860–65

United States Minister to Great Britain
- In office June 23, 1871 – March 3, 1876
- President: Ulysses S. Grant
- Preceded by: John Lothrop Motley
- Succeeded by: Edwards Pierrepont

Chairman of the House Republican Conference
- In office March 4, 1869 – March 3, 1871 Serving with Nathaniel P. Banks
- Speaker: James G. Blaine
- Preceded by: Justin S. Morrill (1867)
- Succeeded by: Austin Blair

Member of the U.S. House of Representatives from Ohio's 3rd district
- In office March 4, 1863 – January 5, 1871
- Preceded by: Clement Vallandigham
- Succeeded by: Lewis D. Campbell
- In office March 4, 1843 – March 3, 1851
- Preceded by: Patrick Gaines Goode
- Succeeded by: Hiram Bell

United States Minister to Brazil
- In office August 9, 1851 – October 8, 1853
- President: Millard Fillmore; Franklin Pierce
- Preceded by: David Tod
- Succeeded by: William Trousdale

Member of the Ohio House of Representatives from Montgomery
- In office December 6, 1841 – March 4, 1843
- Succeeded by: Henry S. Gunckel

Personal details
- Born: Robert Cumming Schenck; October 4, 1809 Franklin, Ohio, U.S.
- Died: March 23, 1890 (aged 80) Washington, D.C., U.S.
- Resting place: Woodland Cemetery, Dayton, Ohio
- Party: Whig; Republican
- Spouse: Renelsche Smith
- Relations: William Cortenus Schenck (father); James F. Schenck (brother)
- Education: Miami University

Military service
- Allegiance: United States of America
- Branch/service: Union Army
- Years of service: 1861–1863
- Rank: Major General
- Commands: VIII Corps
- Battles/wars: American Civil War

Robert Cumming Schenck (October 4, 1809 – March 23, 1890) was a Union Army general in the American Civil War, and American diplomatic representative to Brazil and the United Kingdom. He was at both the First and Second Battle of Bull Run and took part in Jackson's Valley Campaign of 1862, and the Battle of Cross Keys. He served two separate multi-term stints in the U.S. House of Representatives.

His eldest brother, James Findlay Schenck, was a rear admiral in the United States Navy. From 1871 to 1876, Schenck served as US Minister to Britain under Ulysses S. Grant.

== Early life and career ==
Schenck was born on October 4, 1809, in Franklin, Ohio, to William Cortenus Schenck (1773–1821) and Elizabeth Rogers (1776–1853). William Schenck was descended from a prominent Dutch family and was born in Monmouth County, New Jersey. William Schenck was a land speculator and an important early settler of Ohio who had also been in the War of 1812 and, like his son, rose to the rank of general. He died when Robert was only twelve and the boy was put under the guardianship of General James Findlay.

In 1824, Robert Schenck entered Miami University as a sophomore and graduated with a Bachelor of Arts degree with honors in 1827, but remained in Oxford, Ohio, employing his time in reading, and as tutor of French and Latin, until 1830, when he received the degree of Master of Arts.

He began to study law under Thomas Corwin and was admitted to the bar in 1831. He moved to Dayton, Ohio and there rose to a commanding position in his profession. He was in partnership with Joseph Halsey Crane in the firm of Crane and Schenck for many years.

On August 21, 1834, Schenck was married to Miss Renelsche W. Smith (1811–1849) at Nissequogue, Long Island, New York. Six children were born to the union, all girls. Three of them died in infancy. Three daughters survived him. His wife died of tuberculosis in 1849 in Dayton, Ohio.

== Politics ==
His first foray into political life came in 1838 when he ran unsuccessfully for the State Legislature; he gained a term in 1841. In the Presidential campaign of 1840, he acquired the reputation of being one of the ablest speakers on the Whig side. He was elected to the United States Congress from his district in 1843, and re-elected in 1845, 1847 (when he was chairman of the Committee on Roads and Canals) and 1849. His first conspicuous work was to help repeal the gag rule that had long been used to prevent antislavery petitions being read on the floor of the house. He opposed the Mexican–American War as a war of aggression to further slavery.

He declined re-election in 1851, and, in March 1851, was appointed by President Millard Fillmore, Minister to Brazil and also accredited to Uruguay, Argentine Confederation, and Paraguay. He was directed by the Government to visit Buenos Aires, Montevideo, and Asunción, and make treaties with the republics around the Río de la Plata and its tributaries. Several treaties were concluded with these governments by which the United States gained advantages never accorded to any European nation. The Democratic victory in 1852 caused the treaty of commerce with Uruguay to fail to be ratified by the United States Senate.

In 1854, Schenck returned to Ohio, and though sympathizing generally in the views of the Republican party, his personal antipathy to John C. Fremont was so strong that he took no part in the election. He was building a lucrative law practice and was also President of the Fort Wayne Western Railroad Company. He became more in sympathy with the Republican party, and in September 1859, Schenck delivered a speech in Dayton regarding the growing animosity within the country. In this speech, Schenck recommended that the Republican Party nominate Abraham Lincoln for the presidency.

This was perhaps the first public endorsement of Lincoln for the presidency. Schenck supported Lincoln with great ardor at the Chicago Convention in 1860 and in the campaign that followed.

== Civil War ==
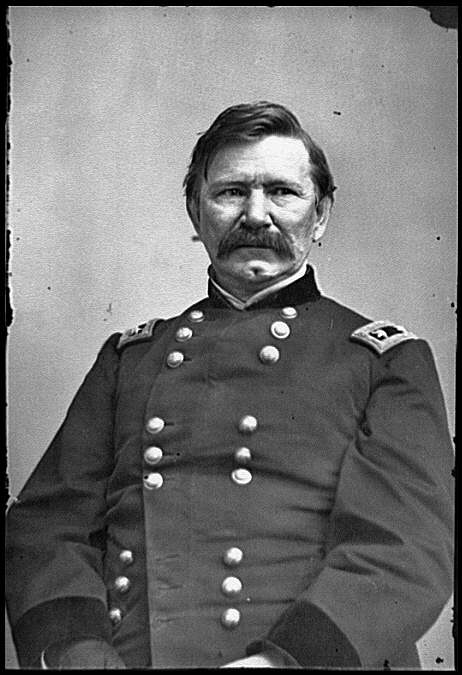
Schenck as a Union Army general during the American Civil War

When the attack was made on Fort Sumter, Schenck promptly tendered his services to the President. He later recalled his meeting with Lincoln:

"Lincoln sent for me and asked, 'Schenck what can you do to help me?' I said, 'Anything you want me to do. I am anxious to help you.' He asked, 'Can you fight?' I answered, 'I would try.' Lincoln said, 'Well, I want to make a general out of you.' I replied, 'I don't know about that Mr. President, you could appoint me as general but I might not prove to be one.' Then he did so and I went to war."

Schenck was commissioned brigadier general of volunteers. Many West Point graduates sneered at political generals. Schenck had not been a military man, but he had been a diligent student of military science.

On June 17, 1861, Union Army Maj. Gen. Irvin McDowell sent the 1st Ohio Volunteer Infantry Regiment (90–day) under the overall command of Schenck and the immediate command of Col. Alexander McDowell McCook to expand the Union position in Fairfax County, Virginia. Schenck took six companies over the Alexandria, Loudon and Hampshire Railroad line, dropping off detachments to guard railroad bridges between Alexandria, Virginia and Vienna, Virginia. As the train approached Vienna, about 4 miles (6.4 km) north of Fairfax Court House and 15 miles (24 km) from Alexandria, 271 officers and men remained with the train. On the same day, Confederate States Army Col. Maxcy Gregg took the 6–month 1st South Carolina Infantry Regiment, about 575 men, two companies of cavalrymen (about 140 men) and a company of artillery with two artillery pieces (35 men), about 750 men in total, on a scouting mission from Fairfax Court House toward the Potomac River. On their return trip, at about 6:00 p.m., the Confederates heard the train whistle in the distance. Gregg moved his artillery pieces to a curve in the railroad line near Vienna and placed his men around the guns. Seeing this disposition, an elderly local Union sympathizer ran down the tracks to warn the approaching train of the hidden Confederate force. The Union officers mostly ignored his warning and the train continued down the track. In the only response to the warning, an officer was placed on the forward car as a lookout.

The Union soldiers were riding open gondola or platform cars as the train backed down the track toward Vienna. As the train rounded a curve within 0.25 miles (0.40 km) of Vienna, one of the men spotted some Confederate cavalrymen on a nearby hill. As the Ohio soldiers prepared to shoot at the horsemen, the Confederates fired their cannons from their hiding place around the curve. The Union force suffered several casualties but were spared from incurring even more by the slightly high initial cannon shots and by quickly jumping from the slow–moving train and either running into nearby woods or moving into protected positions near the cars. Schenck ordered Lieutenant William H. Raynor to go back to the engine and have the engineer take the train out of range in the other direction. Schenck quickly followed Raynor. Raynor had to help loosen the brakes. Since the brakeman had uncoupled most of the cars, the engineer left them. He did not stop for the Union soldiers to catch up but continued all the way back to Alexandria. Schenck now had no means of communication and had to have the wounded men carried back to their camp in blankets by soldiers on foot. The regiment's medical supplies and instruments had been left on the train. Many of the Union infantrymen took shelter behind the cars and tried to return fire against the Confederate force amid a confusion of conflicting orders. McCook reorganized many of them in the woods. The two forces were slightly out of effective musket range and few shots were taken by either side.

As darkness fell, the Union force was able to retreat and to elude Confederate cavalry pursuers in the broken terrain. The Confederate pursuit also was apparently called off early due to apprehension that the Union force might be only the advance of a larger body of troops and because the Confederate force was supposed to return to their base that night. Confederates took such supplies and equipment as were left behind and burned a passenger car and five platform cars that had been left behind. The Union force suffered casualties of eight soldiers killed and four wounded. The Confederates reported no casualties. The Union officers were criticized for not sending skirmishers in front of the train which had moved slowly along the track and for disregarding the warning given to them by the local Union sympathizer. The Battle of Vienna, Virginia followed the Union defeat at the Battle of Big Bethel only a week earlier and historian William C. Davis noted that "the press were much agitated by the minor repulse at Vienna on June 17, and the people were beginning to ask when the Federals would gain some victories."

Schenck's next appearance was at the First Battle of Bull Run, July 21, 1861, where he commanded a brigade in Brig. Gen. Daniel Tyler's division. After the tide of battle turned against the Union force and many units began to flee the battlefield, parts of Schenck's brigade, along with the United States Regulars under Maj. George Sykes, the brigade of three regiments of Germans under Col. Louis Blenker, the brigade of Col. Erasmus Keyes and the 1st and 2nd Rhode Island Infantry Regiments left the field in relatively good order as the remainder of the Union Army retreated in disorder.

Schenck was subsequently in command under Maj. Gen. William Rosecrans in West Virginia, and under Maj. Gen. John C. Fremont in the Luray Valley. He took part in the Jackson's Valley Campaign of 1862 in the Shenandoah Valley, the Battle of Cross Keys and was, for a time, commander of the I Corps, in Maj. Gen. Franz Sigel's absence. Ordered to join the Army of Virginia, then under Maj. Gen. John Pope, he joined it just before the Second Battle of Bull Run, and was in the thick of the fighting of the two days that followed, being severely wounded on the second day, and his right arm permanently injured. He was promoted to major general September 18, 1862 to rank from August 30, 1862.

Schenck was unfit for field duty for six months, but was assigned to the command of VIII Corps, embracing the turbulent citizens of Maryland, repressing all turbulence and acts of disloyalty or any complicity with treason. Schenck was not popular with the disloyal portion of the inhabitants of Maryland. In December 1863, he resigned his commission to take his seat in Congress.

== Postbellum activities ==
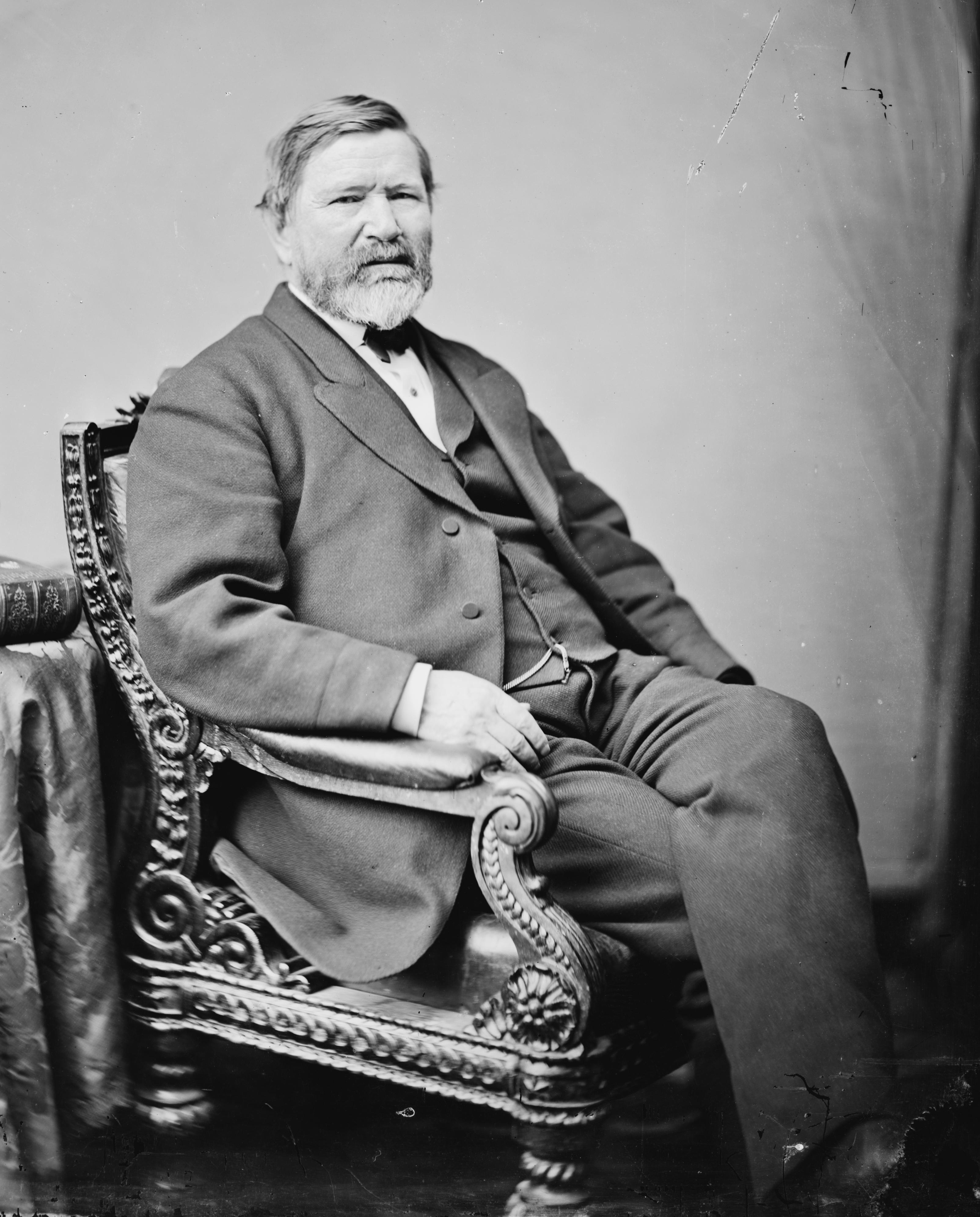

He had been elected over Democrat Clement Vallandigham, running in absentia after being deported by Lincoln for a speech he gave in Mt. Vernon, Ohio, from the Third Congressional District (Dayton) of Ohio. He was at once made House Chairman of the Committee on Military Affairs. It was said that in military matters he was the firm friend of the volunteer, as against what he thought the encroachments and assumptions of the regulars; the remorseless enemy of deserters; a vigorous advocate of the draft, and the author of the disfranchisement of those who ran away from it; the champion of the private soldiers and subordinate officers. He was re-elected to the Thirty-Eighth, Thirty-Ninth, Fortieth and Forty-First Congresses, and from his position was a leader of the House, including service as Chairman of the Ways and Means Committee.

Failing re-election by just fifty-three votes in 1870, Schenck was appointed by President Ulysses Grant as Minister to the United Kingdom, and he sailed for England in July 1871. As a member on the Alabama Claims Commission, he took part in settling the claims arising from the exploits of Raphael Semmes and his Confederate raider. In his book History of Monetary Systems, historian Alexander Del Mar intimates on p. 488 and 489 that Schenck was instrumental in passing a bill denominating currency in only gold, whereas it had been previously redeemable in silver, as well. This is significant as it relates to the panic of 1873.

At a royal party in Somerset, Ambassador Schenck was attending a reception hosted by Queen Victoria, when he was persuaded to write down his rules for poker by a duchess. She privately printed the rules for her court. Although several American books had previously discussed the game, this was the first book to deal solely with draw poker published on either side of the Atlantic. The game quickly became popular in England, where it was universally known as "Schenck's poker".

In October 1871, Schenck was paid for the use of his name in the sale of stock in England for the Emma Silver Mine, near Alta, Utah, and became a director of the mining company. Seeing the American minister's name connected with it, British people invested heavily. The Emma mine paid large dividends for a brief time while company insiders sold their shares, but then share prices crashed when it was learned that the mine was exhausted. Schenck was blamed and was ordered home for investigation. He resigned his post in the spring of 1875. A congressional investigation in March 1876 concluded that he was not guilty of wrongdoing but that he had shown very bad judgment in lending his name and office to promote any such scheme.

Upon his return from England later that year, he resumed his law practice in Washington, D.C. He also published a book on draw poker, Draw. Rules for Playing Poker (Brooklyn: Privately printed, 1880. 16mo, 17 pages). Schenck was an accomplished scholar, thoroughly informed on international and constitutional law, well versed in political history, and familiar with the whole range of modern literature, English, French, and Spanish.

Schenck died in Washington, D.C., on March 23, 1890, aged 80, and was interred in Woodland Cemetery and Arboretum.

== See also ==
- List of American Civil War generals (Union)

== Notes ==
U.S. House of Representatives
Preceded by Patrick Gaines Goode	Member of the U.S. House of Representatives from Ohio's 3rd congressional district March 4, 1843–March 3, 1851	Succeeded by Hiram Bell
Preceded by Clement Vallandigham	Member of the U.S. House of Representatives from Ohio's 3rd congressional district March 4, 1863–January 5, 1871	Succeeded by Lewis D. Campbell
Diplomatic posts
Preceded by David Tod	United States Minister to Brazil; August 9, 1851–October 8, 1853	Succeeded by William Trousdale
Preceded by J. Lothrop Motley	United States Minister to Great Britain; 1871–1876	Succeeded by Edwards Pierrepont
Military offices
Preceded by John E. Wool	Commander of the VIII Corps (ACW); December 22, 1862 - March 12, 1863	Succeeded by William W. Morris
Preceded by William W. Morris	Commander of the VIII Corps (ACW); March 22, 1863 - August 10, 1863	Succeeded by William W. Morris
Preceded by Gordon Granger	Commander of the VIII Corps (ACW); August 31, 1863 - September 22, 1863	Succeeded by William W. Morris
Preceded by Erastus B. Tyler	Commander of the VIII Corps (ACW); October 10, 1863 - December 5, 1863	Succeeded by Henry H. Lockwood
