= John N. C. Schenck =

John Noble Cummings Schenck
- Born: January 24, 1778
- Died: October 26, 1867 (aged 89)
- Occupation: Postmaster

John Noble Cummings Schenck (January 24, 1778 – October 26, 1867) was an American pioneer and early postmaster of the Northwest Territory.

== Early life ==
John N.C. Schenck, son of Rev. William Schenck, was born January 24, 1778, in Churchville, Pennsylvania. His father had the chief supervision of his education, combined with facilities as were to be found in Ballston, New York, and Huntington, New York. Like his brother William Cortenus Schenck, John went to the Northwest Territory.

== Life in Ohio ==
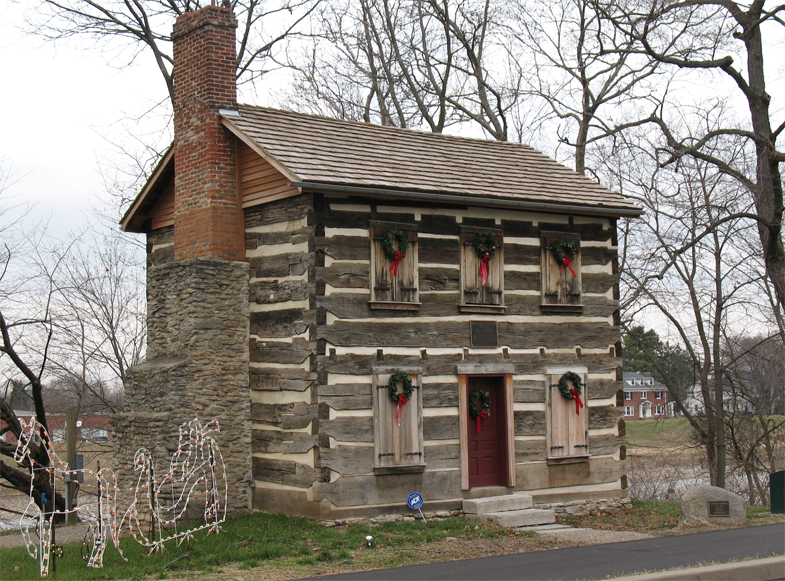
John N.C. Schenck's home in Franklin, Ohio

Once arriving in Cincinnati, John made connections with local businessmen, such as Martin Baum, and established himself as a very savvy businessman. At the insistence of Mr. Baum and his brother, John moved permanently to Franklin, Ohio, around 1801 to establish a point of trade there. In 1802 he built a two-story log cabin for himself in downtown Franklin. Later that year he was appointed one of the first postmasters of Great Miami River valley by President Thomas Jefferson. His home was soon converted into the Franklin Post Office that still stands today in a different location and is the oldest post office in Ohio. He continued to prosper in trade in Akron, Ohio, and Cleveland and he was a key figure in the founding of Dayton, Ohio. He also became a prominent citizen in Franklin, becoming an elector and plotting out many neighborhoods.

== Personal life ==
John was married twice. His married his first wife, Sarah Tapscott, on September 2, 1802; they had twelve children. His second wife was Phebe W. Reeder, widow of his cousin William R. Schenck, and they married on October 8, 1843. He was a successful merchant until his retirement in 1847. He died on October 26, 1867.
