= John Patterson MacLean =

American minister and historian

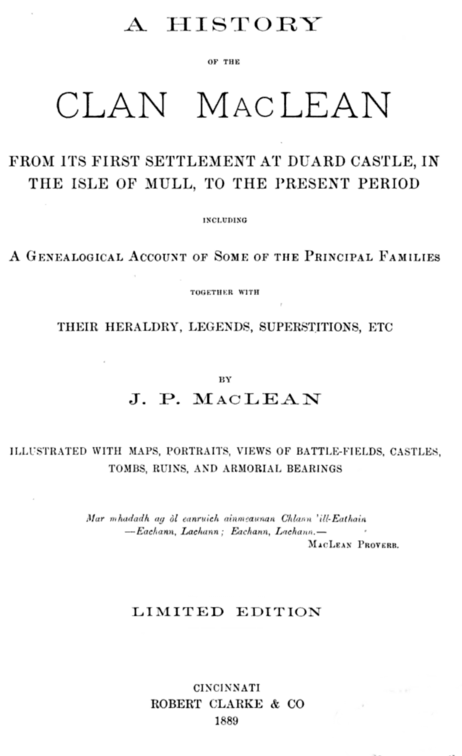
- Born: March 12, 1848; Franklin, Ohio
- Died: August 12, 1939 (aged 91); Greenville, Ohio
- Education: National Normal University; Theological School of St. Lawrence University

John Patterson MacLean (March 12, 1848 – August 12, 1939) was an American Universalist minister, archaeologist and historian. During his time at Ohio State University, he specialized in the history of the Shakers, a religious group.

== Biography ==
He was born on March 12, 1848, in Franklin, Ohio.

At the age of sixteen in 1864, he enrolled in the National Normal University in Lebanon, Ohio. He continued his education at the Theological School of St. Lawrence University in Canton, New York, in 1867, and he became qualified for the ministry in 1869.

In 1887, he traveled to the Island of Mull in Scotland to gather material for his "History of the Macleans."

He completed his Ph.D. in 1894.

He died on August 12, 1939, in Greenville, Ohio, and was buried in Franklin, Ohio.

== Publications ==
Scotland

- A history of the clan MacLean from its first settlement at Duard Castle (1889)
- Renaissance of the clan MacLean (1913)
- An Historical Account of The Settlements of Scotch Highlanders in America Prior to the Peace of 1783

Religion

- A sketch of the life and labors of Richard McNemar (1905)

Shakers

- A concise history of the United Society of Believers called Shakers (1893)
- Shakers of Ohio: fugitive papers concerning the Shakers of Ohio, with unpublished manuscripts (1907)
- A Bibliography of Shaker Literature

Archaeology

- A Manual of the Antiquity of Man (1877)
- The Mound Builders (1879)
- Mastodon, Mammoth and Man (1880)
- An historical, archaeological and geological examination of Fingal's Cave in the island of Staffa (1890)
- The Archaeological Collection of the Western Reserve Historical Society (1901)
- A Critical Examination of the Evidences Adduced to Establish the Theory of the Norse Discovery
