= Franklin, Ohio =

- City
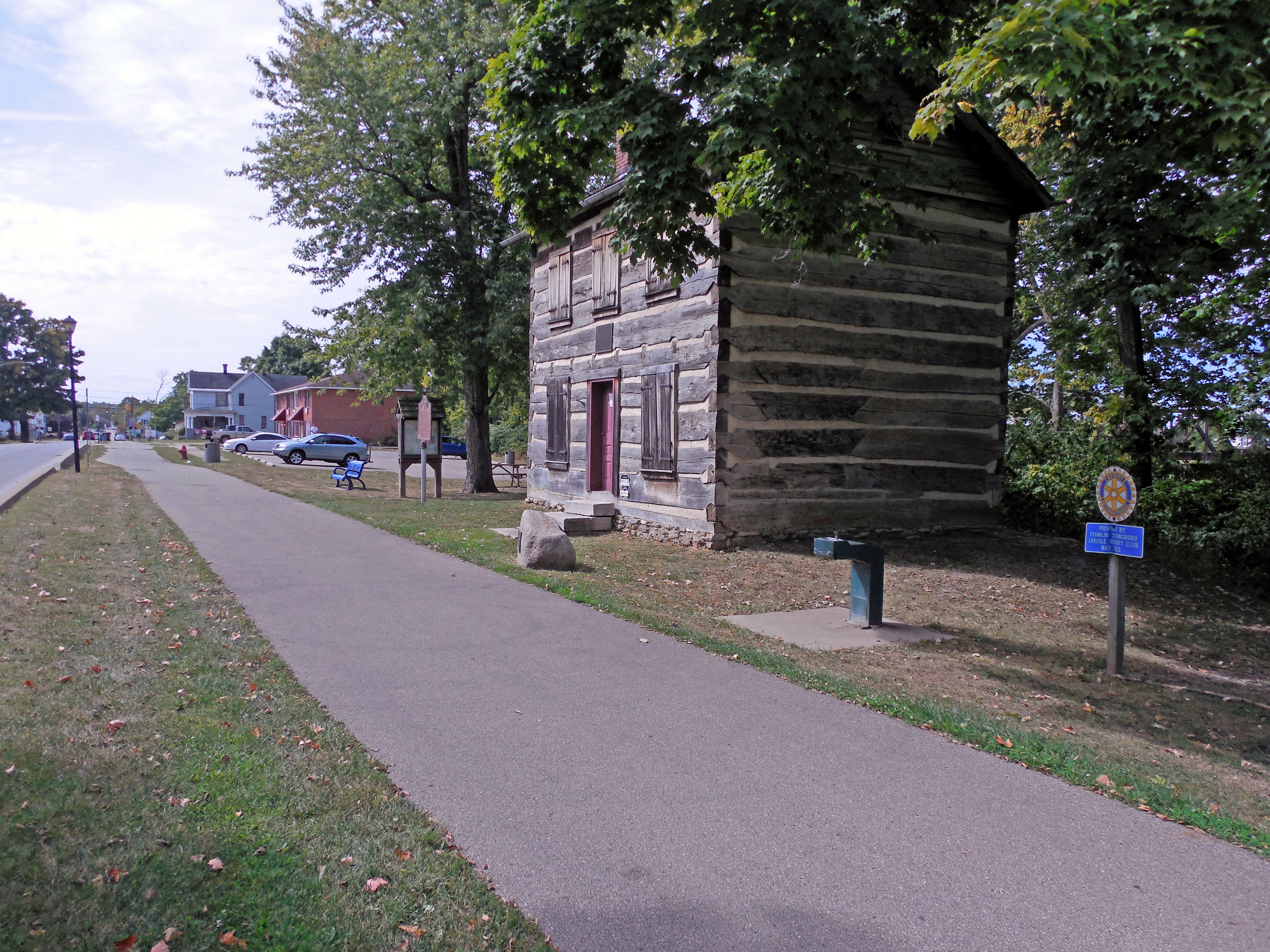
- The old Franklin Post Office along the Great Miami River

- Flag Seal Logo
- Motto: "Keep It Green"
- Interactive map of Franklin, Ohio
- Location within Ohio Location within the United States
- Coordinates: 39°33′13″N 84°17′43″W
- Country: United States
- State: Ohio
- County: Warren
- Founded: 1796
- town: 1814
- city: 1951

Government
  - Type: Council-city manager
  - Mayor: Brent Centers
  - City Manager: Jonathan Westendorf

Area
  - Total: 9.42 sq mi (24.41 km^{2})
  - Land: 9.23 sq mi (23.90 km^{2})
  - Water: 0.20 sq mi (0.51 km^{2}) 1.82%
- Elevation: 686 ft (209 m)

Population (2020)
  - Total: 11,690
  - Estimate (2023): 11,653
  - Density: 1,266.8/sq mi (489.11/km^{2})
- Time zone: UTC-5 (EST)
  - Summer (DST): UTC-4 (EDT)
- ZIP code: 45005
- Area code: 937
- FIPS code: 39-28476
- GNIS feature ID: 2394807
- Website: https://www.franklinohio.org/

Franklin is a city in Warren County, Ohio, United States, along the Great Miami River. The population was 11,690 at the 2020 census. The city lies about 15 miles (24 km) southwest of Dayton and 33.5 miles (53.9 km) northeast of Cincinnati. Ohio State Routes 73, 123 and 741 pass through Franklin, while Interstate 75 is routed to the east side of the city.

== History ==
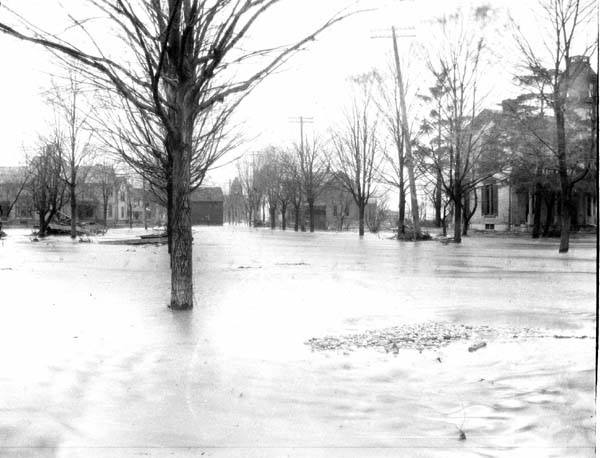
Great Flood of 1913

Franklin was founded by General William C. Schenck, in 1796. The settlement was named for Benjamin Franklin. Franklin was incorporated in 1814, and became a city in 1951. One of the first four post offices in Warren County was established in Franklin in 1805. The first postmaster was John N.C. Schenck, brother of General Schenck. The Franklin Post Office still stands (in a different location), and is one of four sites in Franklin listed on the National Register of Historic Places, along with the Mackinaw Historic District.

Construction of the Miami and Erie Canal occurred between 1825 and 1845. The canal followed the Great Miami River through Franklin, and the boat traffic led to new commerce. The town soon had a pork slaughterhouse, barrel making factory, sawmill, and whiskey distillery. Franklin's first mayor, Dr. Absalom Death, was elected at a tavern meeting in 1837. Dr. Death went on to be director of a medical college in Cincinnati. In its history, two doctors in Franklin have been named "Dr. Death".

By the 1850s, the Franklin area was noted for breeding racehorses. One chestnut-colored mare, Nightingale, sired by Mambrino and Wood's Hambletonian, set a 3-mile harness racing record of 6:55½ in 1893. A railroad was completed with a depot in Franklin in 1872. The town continued to prosper, and by 1890, five paper mills were located in Franklin. The town's economy suffered a setback in 1896, when Franklin's only bank crashed. A longtime and trusted teller had embezzled vast amounts of money, affecting the fortunes of many individuals and businesses.

The town marshal of Franklin, George Basore, was shot and killed in 1906 while attempting to arrest an African American man, George White. When White was arrested, a crowd of 300 gathered outside the Franklin jail intent on lynching him. The sheriff and two deputies were able to remove White and take him to nearby Lebanon for his safety. The New York Times reported: "The whole town of Franklin is wrought up over the affair. Colored people were chased out without being given time to explain". White died the following year in the electric chair.

In 1907, Franklin's fire chief, B.H. Miller, walked into the police station and shot dead one of the prisoners who had allegedly had an affair with his wife a month earlier. The town was devastated by the Great Flood of March 1913, when the Great Miami River overflowed its banks.

Franklin opened what was considered the world's first garbage-recycling plant in 1971. Designed and built by the Black Clawson Company, the plant recycled metals from solid waste, and used recovered paper fibers to make roofing materials.

In 1989, Ronald Peters, a café owner in Franklin, was alleged to be the principal bookmaker for baseball player Pete Rose.

In 2015, The Museum of Spiritual Art opened. In 2017, Franklin attracted national attention in the week following the Unite the Right rally in Charlottesville, Virginia, when the city removed an obscure Confederate marker honoring Robert E. Lee that had existed along the right-of-way of Dixie Highway. The marker had been dedicated in 1927 by the United Daughters of the Confederacy in what was at that time a part of Franklin Township.

== Geography ==
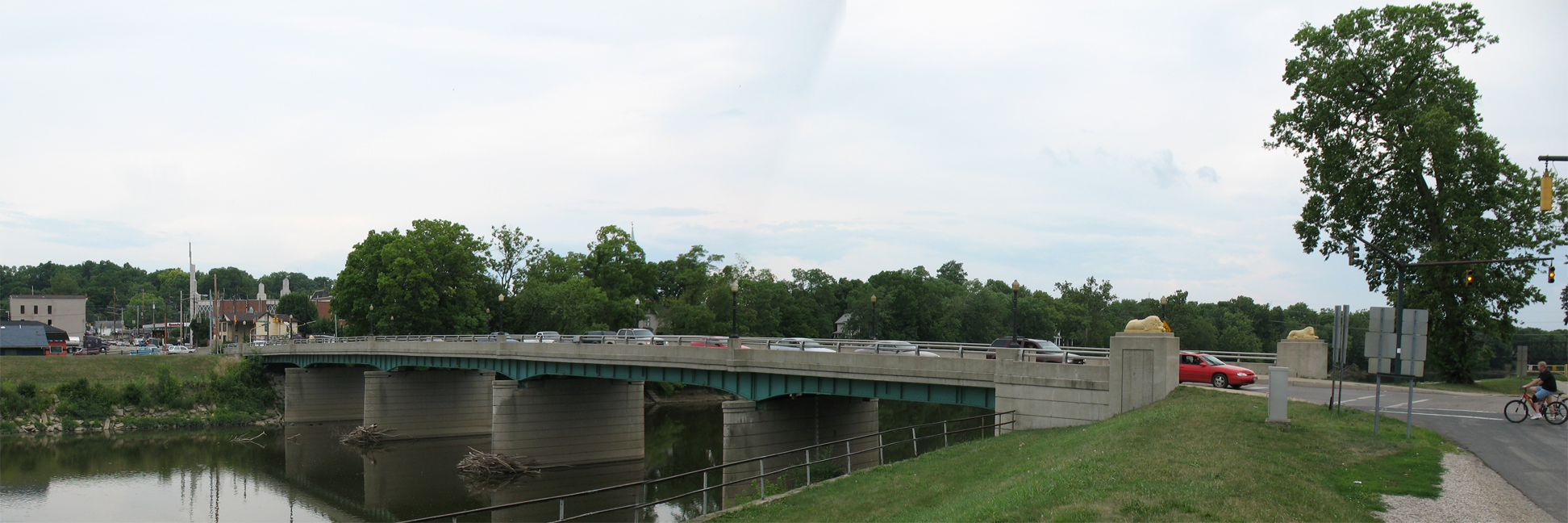
Franklin's Lion Bridge, spanning the Great Miami River and connecting the sections of Franklin on either side of the river (view east).

According to the United States Census Bureau, the city has a total area of 9.34 square miles (24.19 km^{2}), of which 9.17 square miles (23.75 km^{2}) is land and 0.17 square miles (0.44 km^{2}) is water.

=== Climate ===
Climate data for Franklin, Ohio (1991–2020 normals, extremes 1953–present)
Month	Jan	Feb	Mar	Apr	May	Jun	Jul	Aug	Sep	Oct	Nov	Dec	Year
Record high °F (°C)	70 (21)	78 (26)	86 (30)	88 (31)	95 (35)	100 (38)	104 (40)	101 (38)	101 (38)	94 (34)	81 (27)	74 (23)	104 (40)
Mean maximum °F (°C)	60.4 (15.8)	65.0 (18.3)	73.5 (23.1)	81.5 (27.5)	87.3 (30.7)	91.0 (32.8)	93.2 (34.0)	93.3 (34.1)	90.5 (32.5)	82.5 (28.1)	71.5 (21.9)	63.3 (17.4)	95.1 (35.1)
Mean daily maximum °F (°C)	38.4 (3.6)	42.0 (5.6)	52.2 (11.2)	64.7 (18.2)	74.1 (23.4)	82.4 (28.0)	85.8 (29.9)	85.1 (29.5)	78.9 (26.1)	66.7 (19.3)	53.4 (11.9)	42.5 (5.8)	63.8 (17.7)
Daily mean °F (°C)	29.4 (−1.4)	31.9 (−0.1)	41.1 (5.1)	52.0 (11.1)	62.4 (16.9)	71.1 (21.7)	74.6 (23.7)	73.1 (22.8)	66.0 (18.9)	53.9 (12.2)	42.6 (5.9)	34.0 (1.1)	52.7 (11.5)
Mean daily minimum °F (°C)	20.4 (−6.4)	21.8 (−5.7)	30.0 (−1.1)	39.3 (4.1)	50.6 (10.3)	59.9 (15.5)	63.5 (17.5)	61.1 (16.2)	53.1 (11.7)	41.2 (5.1)	31.9 (−0.1)	25.5 (−3.6)	41.5 (5.3)
Mean minimum °F (°C)	0.6 (−17.4)	7.9 (−13.4)	15.3 (−9.3)	25.9 (−3.4)	36.7 (2.6)	47.7 (8.7)	53.7 (12.1)	51.7 (10.9)	41.1 (5.1)	28.6 (−1.9)	18.9 (−7.3)	9.2 (−12.7)	−2.1 (−18.9)
Record low °F (°C)	−25 (−32)	−12 (−24)	−7 (−22)	18 (−8)	27 (−3)	38 (3)	42 (6)	39 (4)	29 (−2)	16 (−9)	−9 (−23)	−21 (−29)	−25 (−32)
Average precipitation inches (mm)	3.32 (84)	2.54 (65)	3.46 (88)	4.58 (116)	4.40 (112)	4.45 (113)	4.34 (110)	2.87 (73)	2.87 (73)	3.20 (81)	3.03 (77)	3.25 (83)	42.31 (1,075)
Average precipitation days (≥ 0.01 in)	9.2	8.5	10.6	11.3	11.3	10.1	9.0	6.5	6.9	8.2	8.7	8.9	109.2
Source: NOAA

== Demographics ==
Historical population
Census	Pop.	Note	%±
1810	202		—
1830	584		—
1840	770		31.8%
1850	972		26.2%
1870	1,832		—
1880	2,385		30.2%
1890	2,729		14.4%
1900	2,724		−0.2%
1910	2,659		−2.4%
1920	3,071		15.5%
1930	4,491		46.2%
1940	4,511		0.4%
1950	5,388		19.4%
1960	7,917		46.9%
1970	10,075		27.3%
1980	10,711		6.3%
1990	11,026		2.9%
2000	11,396		3.4%
2010	11,771		3.3%
2020	11,690		−0.7%
2023 (est.)	11,653		−0.3%

=== 2020 census ===
As of the 2020 census, Franklin had a population of 11,690. The median age was 38.3 years. 23.9% of residents were under the age of 18 and 15.4% were 65 years of age or older. For every 100 females there were 93.6 males, and for every 100 females age 18 and over there were 91.3 males age 18 and over.

99.8% of residents lived in urban areas, while 0.2% lived in rural areas.

There were 4,822 households in Franklin, of which 31.4% had children under the age of 18 living in them. Of all households, 40.2% were married-couple households, 19.6% were households with a male householder and no spouse or partner present, and 31.3% were households with a female householder and no spouse or partner present. About 30.2% of all households were made up of individuals and 12.4% had someone living alone who was 65 years of age or older.

There were 5,110 housing units, of which 5.6% were vacant. The homeowner vacancy rate was 1.2% and the rental vacancy rate was 4.9%.

Racial composition as of the 2020 census
Race	Number	Percent
White	10,594	90.6%
Black or African American	281	2.4%
American Indian and Alaska Native	28	0.2%
Asian	97	0.8%
Native Hawaiian and Other Pacific Islander	1	0.0%
Some other race	82	0.7%
Two or more races	607	5.2%
Hispanic or Latino (of any race)	229	2.0%

=== 2010 census ===
As of the census of 2010, there were 11,771 people, 4,667 households, and 3,162 families residing in the city. The population density was 1,283.6 inhabitants per square mile (495.6/km^{2}). There were 5,026 housing units at an average density of 548.1 per square mile (211.6/km^{2}). The racial makeup of the city was 96.2% White, 0.9% African American, 0.2% Native American, 0.5% Asian, 0.4% from other races, and 1.7% from two or more races. Hispanic or Latino of any race were 1.6% of the population.

There were 4,667 households, of which 35.9% had children under the age of 18 living with them, 45.9% were married couples living together, 15.7% had a female householder with no husband present, 6.2% had a male householder with no wife present, and 32.2% were non-families. 26.8% of all households were made up of individuals, and 9.8% had someone living alone who was 65 years of age or older. The average household size was 2.49 and the average family size was 3.00.

The median age in the city was 36.7 years. 25.5% of residents were under the age of 18; 8.6% were between the ages of 18 and 24; 27.2% were from 25 to 44; 26.3% were from 45 to 64; and 12.5% were 65 years of age or older. The gender makeup of the city was 48.2% male and 51.8% female.

=== 2000 census ===
As of the census of 2000, there were 11,396 people, 4,553 households, and 3,155 families residing in the city. The population density was 1,251.0 inhabitants per square mile (483.0/km^{2}). There were 4,802 housing units at an average density of 527.1 per square mile (203.5/km^{2}). The racial makeup of the city was 97.51% White, 0.82% African American, 0.12% Native American, 0.40% Asian, 0.32% from other races and 0.82% from two or more races. Hispanic or Latino of any race were 0.71% of the population.

There are 4,553 households, out of which 33.9% had children under the age of 18 living with them, 51.0% were married couples living together, 13.9% had a female householder with no husband present, and 30.7% were non-families. 26.3% of all households were made up of individuals, and 9.9% had someone living alone who was 65 years of age or older. The average household size was 2.48 and the average family size was 2.99.

In the city the population was spread out, with 26.6% under the age of 18, 9.1% from 18 to 24, 31.7% from 25 to 44, 20.8% from 45 to 64, and 11.7% who were 65 years of age or older. The median age was 34 years. For every 100 females, there were 90.4 males. For every 100 females age 18 and over, there were 87.2 males.

The median income for a household in the city was $38,142, and the median income for a family was $45,152. Males had a median income of $35,401 versus $24,752 for females. The per capita income for the city was $17,910. About 8.2% of families and 10.1% of the population were below the poverty line, including 12.3% of those under age 18 and 8.4% of those age 65 or over.

== Education ==
Franklin is served by the public Franklin City School District, which includes the following schools:

- Anthony Wayne Elementary School
- Hunter Elementary School
- Schenck Elementary School
- Pennyroyal Elementary School
- Gerke Elementary School
- Franklin Junior High School.
- Franklin High School.

The city is also served by the private Bishop Fenwick High School under the Archdiocese of Cincinnati.

Franklin is home to the Franklin Public Library, a branch of the Franklin-Springboro Public Library.

== Notable people ==
- Samuel Bigger, seventh Governor of Indiana
- Lewis D. Campbell, U.S. Representative for Ohio
- Mary Kennedy Carter, teacher and civil rights activist
- Will Earhart, music educator.
- Bergen Evans, lexicographer, Rhodes Scholar, professor, and television host.
- Edwin F. Harding, commander of U.S. National Guard 32nd Infantry Division
- Justin Woodward Harding, judge on the tribunal presiding over the Judges' Trial
- Darrell Hedric, college basketball coach
- Gene Huff, member of Kentucky House of Representatives and Senate
- Luke Kennard, Duke Blue Devils men's basketball player, 12th overall pick by the Detroit Pistons in the 2017 NBA draft
- Travis Lakins, former pitcher for Ohio State Buckeyes baseball, former pitcher for the Boston Red Sox and Baltimore Orioles
- Frank Lickliter, professional golfer
- John Patterson MacLean, Universalist minister, archaeologist, and historian
- William A. Newell, 18th Governor of New Jersey
- James F. Schenck, U.S. Navy admiral and brother of Robert
- John N. C. Schenck, first post master of the Miami River Valley and early plotter of Warren County
- Robert C. Schenck, U.S. Army general and brother of James
- William Cortenus Schenck, American army general in the War of 1812, pioneer surveyor of the Northwest Territory, and founder of Franklin; father of James and Robert
- Derik Steiner, professional football player
- Shannon Stewart, fashion model and beauty pageant contestant
- Wilbur P. Thirkield, president of Howard University
- Bob Timberlake, professional football player
