= Franklin High School (Franklin, Ohio) =

Franklin Junior High School

Location
- 750 East 4th Street; Franklin, Ohio 45005; United States; 39°33′14″N 84°17′11″W

Information
- School type: Public, Coeducational
- Established: 1969; 57 years ago
- School district: Franklin City School District
- Superintendent: Michael D. Sander
- NCES School ID: 390440000963
- Principal: Alicia Mailhot
- Grades: 6–8
- Color
- Nickname: Wildcats
- Rivals: Carlisle High School, Valley View High School (Ohio) Monroe High School (Ohio)
- Website: www.franklincityschools.com/franklin-junior-high-school//

Franklin Junior High School (formerly Franklin High School) is a public middle school located in Franklin, Ohio. It serves students in grades 6 through 8 and is part of the Franklin City School District. The school opened in 1969 and provided education to thousands of students in the Franklin area, being known for its academic programs, extracurricular activities, and athletic achievements.

== Notable alumni ==
- Luke Kennard – professional basketball player
- Travis Lakins Sr. – professional baseball player

== Athletics and extracurriculars ==
=== Ohio High School Athletic Association State Championships ===
- Boys Gymnastics – 1974, 1977, 1978, 1979, 1982, 1985, 1986, 1988, 1989
