= 4th Ohio General Assembly =

←	3rd	5th	→
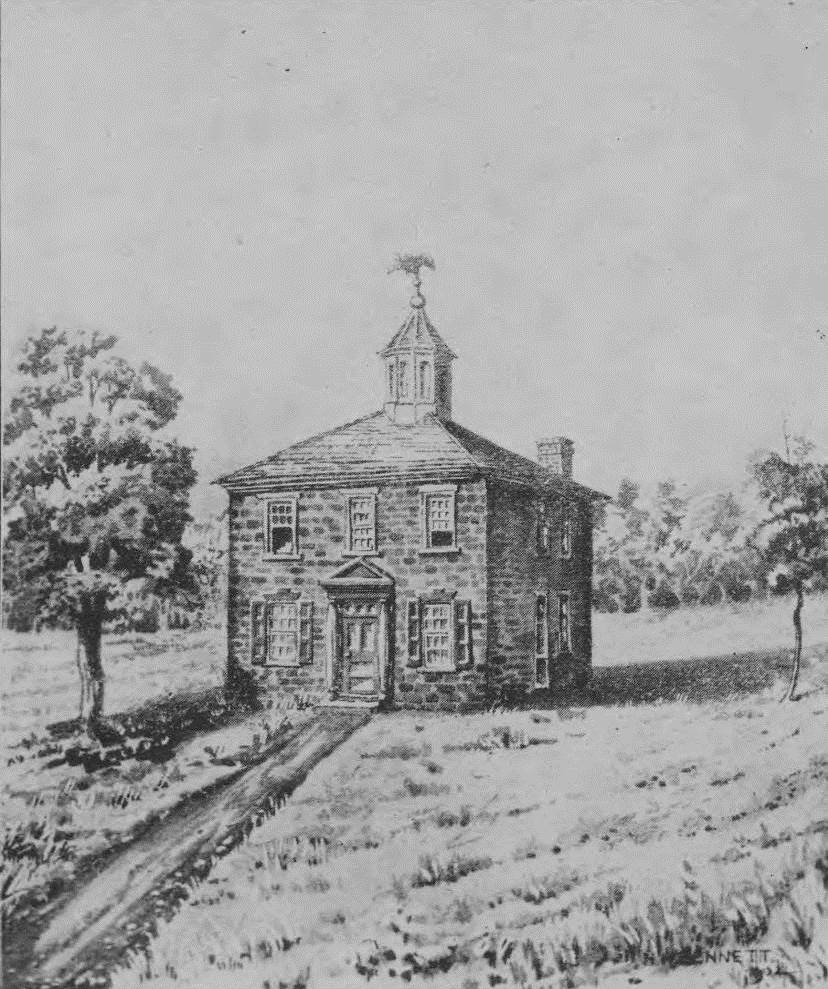
- Ohio's first statehouse at Chillicothe (1800)

Overview
- Meeting place: Chillicothe, Ohio, USA
- Term: December 2, 1805 – November 30, 1806

Ohio Senate
- Members: 15
- Speaker of the Senate: James Pritchard (D-R)
- Party control: Democratic-Republican Party

House of Representatives
- Members: 30
- House Speaker: John Sloane (D-R)
- Party control: Democratic-Republican Party

Sessions
- 1st: December 2, 1805 – January 27, 1806

The Fourth Ohio General Assembly was the fourth meeting of the Ohio state legislature, composed of the Ohio State Senate and the Ohio House of Representatives. It convened in Chillicothe, Ohio, on December 2, 1805, and adjourned January 27, 1806. This General Assembly coincided with the first year of Edward Tiffin's second and final term as Ohio Governor.

== Background ==
Under Ohio's first constitution, State Senators were elected to two year terms. Members of the House were elected for each term. Article I, section 2 and 6 of Ohio's first constitution called for an enumeration of white male inhabitants of 21 years age every four years, with the number of representatives and senators for each county apportioned by the legislature based on this census. Article I, section 3 called for elections the second Tuesday in October.

James Pritchard of Jefferson County was again elected Speaker of the Senate on December 4, 1805, having served as Speaker during the end of the 3rd Ohio General Assembly. The Senate Clerk was Thomas Scott and the Senate Doorkeeper was Edward Sherlock.

John Sloane, also of Jefferson County, was elected Speaker of the House on December 4. This marked the first time the Speaker of the House was not from Ross County. The House Clerk was William R. Dickinson and the House Doorkeeper was Adam Betz.

== State Senate ==
=== Districts ===
For this session, the legislature apportioned two senators for Warren, Butler, Montgomery, and Greene Counties, Washington, Gallia, Muskingum and Athens Counties, Jefferson and Columbiana Counties, Ross and Franklin Counties, and Hamilton County, and one senator each for Adams and Scioto Counties, Clermont, Fairfield, Trumbull and Belmont Counties.

=== Members ===
District	Senator	Party	notes
Adams; Scioto	Thomas Kirker	Democratic-Republican	
Belmont	Joseph Sharp		
Clermont	James Sargent	Democratic-Republican	
Fairfield	Jacob Burton		
Hamilton	Cornelius Snider		
Hamilton	Stephen Wood		
Jefferson; Columbiana	Benjamin Hough	Democratic-Republican	
Jefferson; Columbiana	James Pritchard	Democratic-Republican	elected Speaker of the Senate
Ross; Franklin	Joseph Kerr	Democratic-Republican	
Ross; Franklin	Duncan McArthur	Federalist	
Trumbull	George Tod	Democratic-Republican	
Warren; Butler; Montgomery; Greene	John Bigger	Democratic-Republican	
Warren; Butler; Montgomery; Greene	Jacob Smith		
Washington; Gallia; Muskingum; Athens	Joseph Buell	Democratic-Republican	
Washington; Gallia; Muskingum; Athens	Hallam Hempstead		

== Ohio House of Representatives ==
=== Districts ===
For this session, the legislature apportioned four representatives for Ross and Franklin Counties, three representatives each for Adams and Scioto Counties, Jefferson County and Hamilton County, two representatives each for Belmont, Butler, Fairfield, Trumbull and Warren Counties, and Washington, Gallia and Athens Counties, and one representative each for Columbiana, Clermont, Greene, Montgomery and Muskingum Counties.

=== Members ===
District	Representatives	Party	notes
Adams; Scioto	Daniel Collier		
Adams; Scioto	Philip Lewis		
Adams; Scioto	Abraham Shepherd	Democratic-Republican	
Belmont	James Smith		
Belmont	John Stewart		
Butler	James McClure		
Butler	Matthew Richardson		
Clermont	Jonathan Taylor		
Columbiana	John McConnell		
Fairfield	Philemon Beecher	Federalist	
Fairfield	Robert Cloud		
Greene	John Sterritt		
Hamilton	Adrian Hegeman		
Hamilton	John Jones		
Hamilton	Hezekiah Price		
Jefferson	Thomas Elliott		
Jefferson	John McLaughlin		
Jefferson	John Sloane	Democratic-Republican	elected Speaker of the House
Montgomery	William Robinson		
Ross; Franklin	James Dunlap	Democratic-Republican	
Ross; Franklin	Elias Langham	Democratic-Republican	
Ross; Franklin	David Shelby		
Ross; Franklin	Abraham J. Williams	Democratic Republican	
Trumbull	Homer Hine		
Trumbull	James Kingsbury		
Warren	Peter Burr		
Warren	Matthias Corwin	Democratic-Republican	
Washington; Gallia; Athens	Elijah Hatch		
Washington; Gallia; Athens	James E. Phelps		
Muskingum	James Clarke		

== Major events ==
The 3rd Ohio General Assembly adopted a single article of impeachment against William W. Irvin, an associate judge in the Fairfield County Court of Common Pleas, for "high misdemeanor and neglect of duties", alleging that Judge Irvin was absent from his court for two days, leading to the suspension of all business matters therein, and the abrupt adjournment of that court. Judge Irvin's impeachment trial was conducted before the Ohio Senate from December 6, 1805 - January 11, 1806, with a recess spanning from December 11 - January 6. It was alleged during the trial that Judge Irvin refused to meet with the President and other judges of the court, and spoke "slightingly" of his judicial responsibilities. On January 11, the Senate voted 14-1 (with Kerr being the sole negative vote) to impeach Judge Irvin, and by a separate vote of 11-4 (negatives votes were Bigger, Hempstead, Kerr, and Tod), Judge Irvin was removed from the bench.

On January 20, a joint session of the legislature convened to elect several statewide officers and county judges.

On January 25, a joint session of the legislature convened to elect tax collectors for the state.

== Major legislation ==
Geauga County was erected from western Trumbull County by an act of the legislature on December 31, 1805.

In January 1806, the legislature adopted a joint resolution of the Senate to support an amendment to the United States Constitution that would have allowed for federal judges to be removed by a majority of both chambers of Congress during a joint session of that body. The amendment ultimately was not ratified.

A general system for the construction of public highways throughout the state, as well as the systemization of the state militia laws, were some of the core acts passed during this General Assembly.

== See also ==
- List of Ohio state legislatures
