= 5th Ohio General Assembly =

←	4th	6th	→
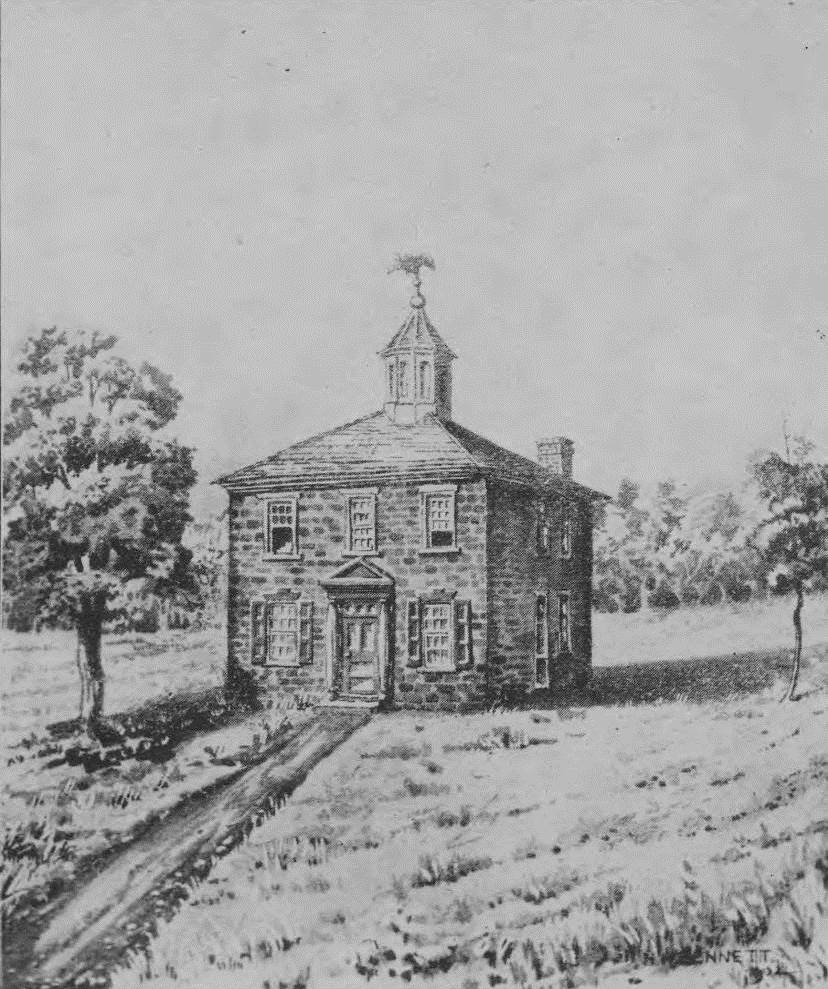
- Ohio's first statehouse at Chillicothe (1800)

Overview
- Meeting place: Chillicothe, Ohio, USA
- Term: December 1, 1806 – December 6, 1807

Ohio Senate
- Members: 15
- Speaker of the Senate: Thomas Kirker (D-R)
- Party control: Democratic-Republican Party

House of Representatives
- Members: 30
- House Speaker: Abraham Shepherd (D-R)
- Party control: Democratic-Republican Party

Sessions
- 1st: December 1, 1806 – February 4, 1807

The Fifth Ohio General Assembly was the fifth meeting of the Ohio state legislature, composed of the Ohio State Senate and the Ohio House of Representatives. It convened in Chillicothe, Ohio, on December 1, 1806, and adjourned February 4, 1807. This General Assembly coincided with the second year of Edward Tiffin's final term as Ohio Governor.

== Background ==
Under Ohio's first constitution, State Senators were elected to two year terms. Members of the House were elected for each term. Article I, section 2 and 6 of Ohio's first constitution called for an enumeration of white male inhabitants of 21 years age every four years, with the number of representatives and senators for each county apportioned by the legislature based on this census. Article I, section 3 called for elections the second Tuesday in October.

Thomas Kirker of Adams County was elected Speaker of the Senate. The Senate Clerk was Thomas Scott and the Senate Doorkeeper was Edward Sherlock.

Abraham Shepherd, also of Adams County, was elected Speaker of the House. The House Clerk was William R. Dickinson and the House Doorkeeper was Adam Betz.

== State Senate ==
=== Districts ===
For this session, the legislature apportioned two senators for Warren, Butler, Montgomery, Greene and Champaign Counties, Washington, Gallia, Muskingum and Athens Counties, Jefferson and Columbiana Counties, Ross, Franklin, and Highland Counties, and Hamilton County, and one senator each for Trumbull and Geauga Counties, Adams and Scioto Counties, Clermont, Fairfield, and Belmont Counties.

=== Members ===
District	Senator	Party	notes
Adams; Scioto	Thomas Kirker	Democratic-Republican	elected Speaker of the Senate
Belmont	Joseph Sharp		
Clermont	James Sargent	Democratic-Republican	
Fairfield	Elnathan Scofield		
Hamilton	William McFarland		
Hamilton	Stephen Wood		
Jefferson; Columbiana	Benjamin Hough	Democratic-Republican	
Jefferson; Columbiana	John Taggart		
Ross; Franklin; Highland	Abraham Claypool		
Ross; Franklin; Highland	Duncan McArthur	Federalist	
Trumbull; Geauga	Calvin Cone		
Warren; Butler; Montgomery; Greene; Champaign	Jacob Smith		
Warren; Butler; Montgomery; Greene; Champaign	Richard S. Thomas		
Washington; Gallia; Muskingum; Athens	Hallam Hempstead		
Washington; Gallia; Muskingum; Athens	Leonard Jewett		

== Ohio House of Representatives ==
=== Districts ===
For this session, the legislature apportioned four representatives for Ross, Franklin and Highland Counties, three representatives each for Adams and Scioto Counties, Jefferson County and Hamilton County, two representatives each for Belmont, Columbiana, Fairfield and Warren Counties, Trumbull and Geauga Counties, and Washington, Gallia, Muskingum and Athens Counties, and one representative each for Butler, Clermont, Greene and Montgomery Counties.

=== Members ===
District	Representatives	Party	notes
Adams; Scioto	Philip Lewis		
Adams; Scioto	James Scott		
Adams; Scioto	Abraham Shepherd	Democratic-Republican	elected Speaker of the House
Belmont	Josiah Dillon		
Belmont	John Stewart		
Butler	James Shields	Democratic-Republican	
Clermont	David Bryan		never seated (see below)
Clermont	Thomas Morris	Democratic-Republican Party	
Columbiana	Solomon Line		
Columbiana	John McConnell		
Fairfield	Philemon Beecher	Federalist	
Fairfield	William W. Irvin	Democratic-Republican	
Greene	Joseph Tatman		
Hamilton	John Jones		
Hamilton	Hezekiah Price		
Hamilton	Ethan Stone	Federalist	
Jefferson	Samuel Boyd		
Jefferson	Thomas Elliott		
Jefferson	John McLaughlin		
Montgomery	Philip Gunckel		
Ross; Franklin; Highland	James Dunlap	Democratic-Republican	
Ross; Franklin; Highland	Nathaniel Massie	Democratic-Republican	
Ross; Franklin; Highland	David Shelby		
Ross; Franklin; Highland	Abraham J. Williams	Democratic Republican	
Trumbull; Geauga	John P. Bissell		
Trumbull; Geauga	James Kingsbury		
Warren	Peter Burr		
Warren	Matthias Corwin	Democratic-Republican	
Washington; Gallia; Muskingum; Athens	Levi Barber	Democratic-Republican	
Washington; Gallia; Muskingum; Athens	Lewis Cass	Democratic-Republican	
Washington; Gallia; Muskingum; Athens	William H. Puthuff		

== Major events ==
Governor Tiffin's annual address was given before a joint session of the legislature on December 1, 1806. On December 2, a confidential correspondence from the Governor was received by both chambers and closed sessions were held by both chambers regarding said correspondence through December 5. On December 6, a concurrent resolution was adopted to call for the resignation of United States Senator John Smith for his role in the alleged plot of former Vice President Aaron Burr to establish an independent country in the Southwestern United States. Burr and Smith were both charged with treason in 1807. Untimately, Burr was acquitted of all charges related to the scandal, which led to Smith's charges being dropped on a technicality before he went to trial. An expulsion vote for Smith held in the United States Senate in 1808 failed by just one vote. Even so, Smith ultimately resigned on April 25, the last day of the legislative session.

Rep. Morris of Clermont County contested the election of Rep. Bryan, also from Clermont, citing "election irregularities." With only one seat apportioned by the legislature for the county, on December 5, the House voted to seat Rep. Morris by a vote of 15–14. Rep. Bryan was dismissed from the legislature.

On January 1, 1807, a joint session of the legislature met to elect a Senator to the United States Senate, and chief and associate justices to the Ohio Supreme Court. Among those elected were Governor Tiffin to the office of United States Senator for the State of Ohio, and Rep. Burr to the state Supreme Court.

On January 31, a joint session of the legislature met to elect municipal and district-wide officers were, including Senator Hempstead to the Washington County Court of Common Pleas, and Rep. Williams to the office of tax collector for the second district.

On January 8, articles of impeachments were brought forth against Judge Robert F. Slaughter of Fairfield County, who served as the President Judge of Ohio's Second Circuit of Courts of Common Pleas. The impeachment was sponsored by Reps. Beecher, Cass, Irvin - who was impeached by the state legislature from his judgeship a year prior - Scott and Stone. The charge was "misdemeanor" for his lack of attendance at the various courts within his circuit, a key part of his duties as President of the circuit. A trial commenced in the Senate January 9–28. Slaughter was impeached and removed from the bench by a vote of 11 (Claypool, Cone, Hempstead, Hough, Jewett, McArthur, McFarland, Sargent, Smith, Wood, and Speaker Kirker) -1 (Scofield)

== Major legislation ==
Several laws were enacted during this session authorizing lotteries for limited purposes such as paying for the improvement of rivers.

On December 6, 1806, a House Joint Resolution was adopted by the Ohio Senate to express confidence in "the patriotism and fidelity of the National Administration." This resolution was also in response to the Burr controversy and the fallout it caused for the Jefferson Administration.

Also on December 6, the House passed a Senate Joint Resolution declaring its support for the United States outlowing the practice of importing slaves from the West Indies and Africa. Congress went on to ban this practice in 1807, which went into effect on January 1, 1808.

On January 16, land from Montgomery County was detached to form Miami County. The county seat was established at Troy.

On January 30, an act altering the boundary of Athens and Gallia Counties was enacted as such: "Beginning at the northwest corner of section three, range twelve; thence south on the sectional line of number twenty-four, to the southwest corner of said section; thence east between the fifth and sixth tier of sections to the Ohio river."

Additional land was attached to Jefferson County by an act of the legislature on January 31.

On February 10, land from Trumbull County was detached to form Portage County. The county seat was established at Ravenna.

An act introduced in the previous General Assembly to encourage the killing of wolves and panthers was enacted in early 1807. The law required county authorities to offer rewards for the scalps of wolves and panthers taken within its boundaries; between $0.50 and $3.00 for animals six months old or less, and between $1.00 and $4.00 for animals more than six months old. Historians of Ohio's early history state that during this time "perhaps no law was more zealously enforced" than this.

Other acts passed this sessions regulated weights and measures, promoted the construction of public highways, ferries and bridges, improved the election laws, amended the militia laws, and levied state taxes and set forth for the collection thereof.

== See also ==
- List of Ohio state legislatures
