= 6th Ohio General Assembly =

←	5th	7th	→
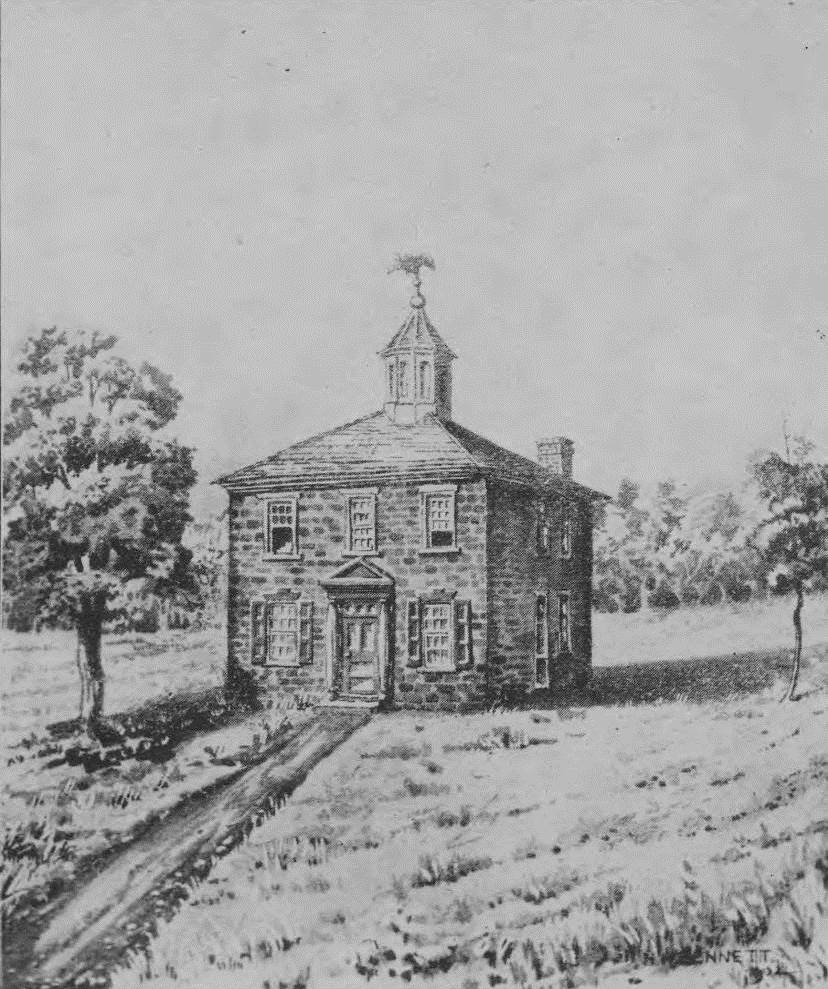
- Ohio's first statehouse at Chillicothe (1800)

Overview
- Meeting place: Chillicothe, Ohio, USA
- Term: December 7, 1807 – December 4, 1808

Ohio Senate
- Members: 15
- Speaker of the Senate: Thomas Kirker (D-R)
- Party control: Democratic-Republican Party

House of Representatives
- Members: 30
- House Speaker: Philemon Beecher (D-R)
- Party control: Democratic-Republican Party

Sessions
- 1st: December 7, 1807 – February 22, 1808

The Sixth Ohio General Assembly was the sixth meeting of the Ohio state legislature, composed of the Ohio State Senate and the Ohio House of Representatives. It convened in Chillicothe, Ohio, on December 7, 1807, and adjourned February 22, 1808.

== Background ==
Under Ohio's first constitution, State Senators were elected to two year terms. Members of the House were elected for each term. Article I, section 2 and 6 of Ohio's first constitution called for an enumeration of white male inhabitants of 21 years age every four years, with the number of representatives and senators for each county apportioned by the legislature based on this census. Article I, section 3 called for elections the second Tuesday in October.

Ohio governor Edward Tiffin had been elected to the United States Senate at the conclusion of the previous General Assembly. Thomas Kirker of Adams County, who had been re-elected Speaker of the Senate, became the acting governor, as dictated by the initial state constitution, and served in this dual capacity the remainder of the General Assembly due to the state's failure to timely elect a successor for Tiffin. The Senate Clerk was Thomas Scott and the Senate Doorkeeper was Edward Sherlock.

Philemon Beecher, of Fairfield County, was elected Speaker of the House, becoming the first person from Fairfield County to do so. The House Clerk was Thomas S. Hinde and the House Doorkeeper was Adam Betz.

== State Senate ==
=== Districts ===
For this session, the legislature apportioned two senators for Warren, Butler, Montgomery, Greene, Champaign and Miami Counties, Washington, Gallia, Muskingum and Athens Counties, Jefferson and Columbiana Counties, Ross, Franklin, and Highland Counties, and Hamilton County, and one senator each for Trumbull and Geauga Counties, Adams and Scioto Counties, Clermont, Fairfield, and Belmont Counties.

=== Members ===
District	Senator	Party	notes
Adams; Scioto	Thomas Kirker	Democratic-Republican	elected Speaker of the Senate served dually as Acting Governor
Belmont	Josiah Dillon		
Clermont	David C. Bryan		
Fairfield	Elnathan Scofield		
Hamilton	Hezekiah Price		
Hamilton	Stephen Wood		
Jefferson; Columbiana	John McConnell		
Jefferson; Columbiana	John McLaughlin		
Ross; Franklin; Highland	Abraham Claypool		
Ross; Franklin; Highland	Duncan McArthur	Federalist	
Trumbull; Geauga	Calvin Cone		
Warren; Butler; Montgomery; Greene; Champaign; Miami	John Bigger		
Warren; Butler; Montgomery; Greene; Champaign; Miami	Richard S. Thomas		
Washington; Gallia; Muskingum; Athens	Leonard Jewett		
Washington; Gallia; Muskingum; Athens	John Sharp		

== Ohio House of Representatives ==
=== Districts ===
For this session, the legislature apportioned four representatives for Ross, Franklin and Highland Counties, three representatives each for Adams and Scioto Counties, Washington, Muskingum, Gallia and Athens Counties, Jefferson County Belmont, and Hamilton County, two representatives each for Butler, Fairfield and Warren Counties, Trumbull and Geauga Counties, and one representative each for Greene and Champaign Counties, Columbiana County and Montgomery County.

=== Members ===
District	Representatives	Party	notes
Adams; Scioto	Alexander Campbell	Democratic-Republican	
Adams; Scioto	Andrew Ellisor		
Adams; Scioto	Philip Lewis		
Belmont	John Patterson	Democratic-Republican	
Belmont	John Pollock		
Belmont	William Vance		
Butler	William Corry		
Butler	James McClure		
Columbiana	John Sloane	Democratic-Republican	
Fairfield	Philemon Beecher	Democratic-Republican	elected Speaker of the House
Fairfield	William W. Irvin	Democratic-Republican	
Greene; Champaign	Joseph Tatman		
Hamilton	Zebulon Foster		
Hamilton	John Jones		
Hamilton	Othniel Looker	Democratic-Republican	
Jefferson	Thomas Elliott		
Jefferson	Benjamin Hough	Democratic-Republican	
Jefferson	Thomas McClure		
Montgomery	Daniel C. Cooper		
Ross; Franklin; Highland	Elias Langham	Democratic-Republican	
Ross; Franklin; Highland	William Lewis		
Ross; Franklin; Highland	Jeremiah McLene	Democratic-Republican	
Ross; Franklin; Highland	Thomas Worthington	Democratic Republican	
Trumbull; Geauga	James Montgomery		
Trumbull; Geauga	John W. Seeley		
Warren	Matthias Corwin	Democratic-Republican	
Warren	George Harlan		
Washington; Muskingum; Gallia; Athens	John P.R. Bureau		
Washington; Muskingum; Gallia; Athens	John Matthews		
Washington; Muskingum; Gallia; Athens	James Palmer		

== See also ==
- List of Ohio state legislatures
