= Jonathan D. Morris =

American politician

Jonathan David Morris

Member of the U.S. House of Representatives from Ohio's 7th district
- In office March 4, 1847 – March 3, 1851
- Preceded by: Joseph J. McDowell
- Succeeded by: Nelson Barrere

Personal details
- Born: October 8, 1804 Columbia, Ohio, U.S.
- Died: May 16, 1875 (aged 70) Connersville, Indiana, U.S.
- Resting place: Citizens Cemetery, Batavia, Ohio
- Party: Democratic

Jonathan David Morris (October 8, 1804 – May 16, 1875) was an American lawyer and politician who served as a two-term U.S. Representative from Ohio from 1847 to 1851.

He was the son of Thomas Morris and brother of Isaac N. Morris.

== Early life and career ==
Born in Columbia, Hamilton County, Ohio Morris attended the public schools. He studied law. He was admitted to the bar and commenced practice in Batavia, Ohio. He served as clerk of the courts of Clermont County.

== Congress ==
Morris was elected as a Democrat to the Thirtieth Congress to fill the vacancy caused by the death of Thomas L. Hamer He was reelected to the Thirty-first Congress and served from March 4, 1847, to March 3, 1851.

== Death ==
He died in Connersville, Indiana, May 16, 1875. He was interred in Citizens Cemetery, Batavia, Ohio.

== Sources ==
- United States Congress. "Jonathan D. Morris (id: M000979)". Biographical Directory of the United States Congress.

U.S. House of Representatives
Preceded by Joseph J. McDowell	Member of the U.S. House of Representatives from Ohio's 7th congressional district 1847-1851	Succeeded by Nelson Barrere
