= Jefferson Township, Adams County, Ohio =

Township in Ohio, US

- Township
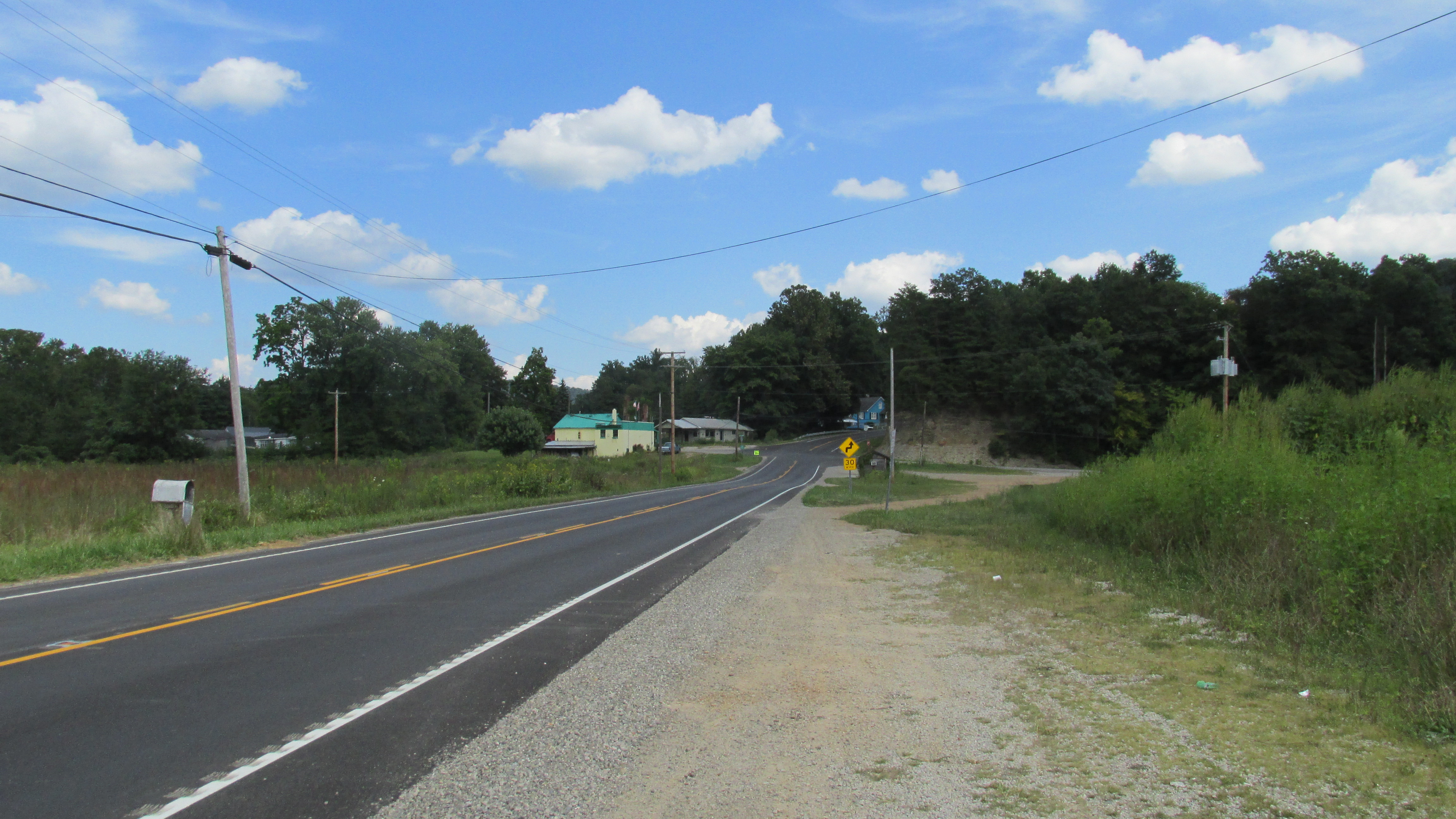
- Approaching Blue Creek

- Location in Adams County and the state of Ohio.
- Coordinates: 38°47′44″N 83°18′51″W
- Country: United States
- State: Ohio
- County: Adams

Area
  - Total: 43.1 sq mi (111.7 km^{2})
  - Land: 43.1 sq mi (111.5 km^{2})
  - Water: 0.039 sq mi (0.1 km^{2})
- Elevation: 640 ft (195 m)

Population (2020)
  - Total: 898
  - Density: 24/sq mi (9.4/km^{2})
- Time zone: UTC-5 (Eastern (EST))
  - Summer (DST): UTC-4 (EDT)
- FIPS code: 39-38486
- GNIS feature ID: 1085678

Jefferson Township is one of the fifteen townships of Adams County, Ohio, United States. The population was 898 at the 2020 census.

== Geography ==
Located in the eastern part of the county, it borders the following townships:

- Meigs Township - north
- Brush Creek Township, Scioto County - northeast
- Nile Township, Scioto County - southeast
- Green Township - south
- Brush Creek Township - west

No municipalities are located in Jefferson Township, although the unincorporated community of Blue Creek lies in the township's west.

== History ==
Jefferson Township was organized in 1806. It is named for Thomas Jefferson.

It is one of twenty-four Jefferson Townships statewide.

== Government ==
The township is governed by a three-member board of trustees, who are elected in November of odd-numbered years to a four-year term beginning on the following January 1. Two are elected in the year after the presidential election and one is elected in the year before it. There is also an elected township fiscal officer, who serves a four-year term beginning on April 1 of the year after the election, which is held in November of the year before the presidential election. Vacancies in the fiscal officership or on the board of trustees are filled by the remaining trustees.

== Notable people ==
- Lloyd Estel Copas, American country music singer, better known by his stage name, Cowboy Copas
