= William Russell (Ohio politician) =

American politician (1782–1845)

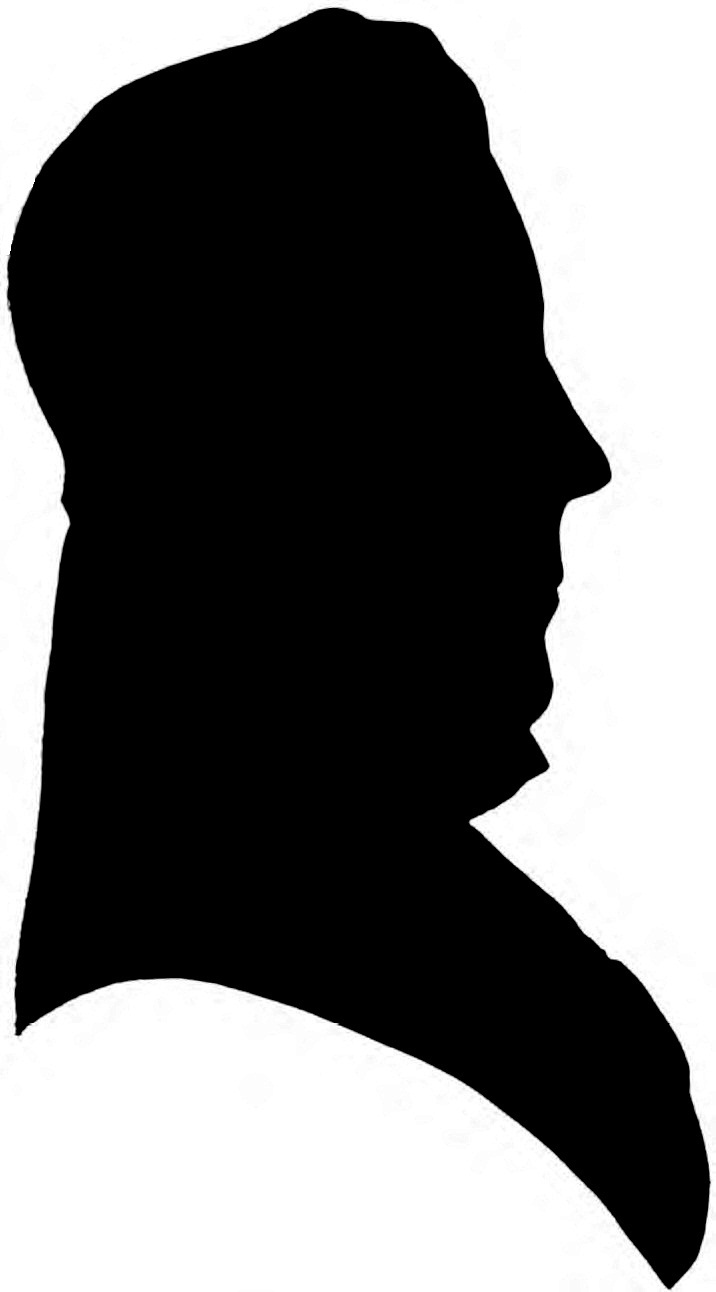

Member of the U.S. House of Representatives from Ohio
- In office March 4, 1827 – March 3, 1833
- Preceded by: John Wilson Campbell
- Succeeded by: Thomas L. Hamer
- Constituency: 5th district
- In office March 4, 1841 – March 3, 1843
- Preceded by: William K. Bond
- Succeeded by: Joseph J. McDowell
- Constituency: 7th district

Member of the Ohio House of Representatives from Adams County
- In office 1809–1810
- Preceded by: Daniel Collier; Abraham Shepherd; John Wright
- Succeeded by: John Wilson Campbell; Abraham Shepherd

Member of the Ohio House of Representatives from Adams County
- In office 1811–1813
- Preceded by: John Wilson Campbell; Abraham Shepherd
- Succeeded by: John Wilson Campbell; Abraham Shepherd

Member of the Ohio House of Representatives from Adams County
- In office 1803–1803
- Preceded by: New district
- Succeeded by: Daniel Collier; Abraham Shepherd; John Wright

Member of the Ohio Senate from Adams County
- In office 1819–1821
- Preceded by: New district
- Succeeded by: Thomas Kirker

Personal details
- Born: 1782 Kingdom of Ireland
- Died: September 28, 1845 (aged 62–63) Scioto County, Ohio, US
- Resting place: Rushtown Cemetery, Scioto County, Ohio
- Party: Jacksonian, Whig
- Spouse: Nancy Wood

William Russell (1782 – September 28, 1845) was a United States representative from Ohio.

== Early life and career ==
Born in the Kingdom of Ireland in 1782, Russell immigrated to the United States and settled in West Union, Ohio. He received a limited schooling and later in life held several local offices. He first served in the Ohio House of Representatives in 1803.

In 1808, Russell married Nancy Wood. They had six sons and one daughter, and eventually settled in Portsmouth, Ohio.

== Ohio congressman and senator ==
Russell was elected in December 1809 to fill a vacancy caused by Ohio Congressman Alexander Campbell's resignation. He served in that same capacity again from 1811 to 1813. Russell held a seat in the Ohio Senate from 1819 to 1821.

== US House ==
Russell was elected (as a Jacksonian) to the Twentieth, Twenty-first, and Twenty-second Congresses (March 4, 1827 – March 3, 1833). His reelection bid for the Twenty-third Congress in 1832 was unsuccessful.

Russell was elected (as a Whig) to the Twenty-seventh Congress (March 4, 1841 – March 3, 1843). He did not run for reelection in 1842.

== Retirement and death ==
Russell retired to his farm along the Little Scioto River, where he died September 28, 1845, aged 62 or 63. He was interred in the old section of Rushtown Cemetery, in Rushtown, Ohio.

Ohio House of Representatives
| New district | Representative from Adams County; 1803; Served alongside: Thomas Kirker, Joseph Lucas | Succeeded by Daniel Collier; Abraham Shepherd; John Wright as Representatives from Adams and Scioto Counties |
| Preceded by Alexander Campbell; Abraham Shepherd | Representative from Adams County; 1809–1810; Served alongside: Abraham Shepherd | Succeeded by John Wilson Campbell; Abraham Shepherd |
| Preceded by John Wilson Campbell; Abraham Shepherd | Representative from Adams County; 1811–1813; Served alongside: John Ellison, Jr. | Succeeded by John Wilson Campbell; John Ellison, Jr. |
Ohio Senate
| New district | Senator from Adams County; 1819–1821 | Succeeded by Thomas Kirker |
U.S. House of Representatives
| Preceded by John Wilson Campbell | Representative from Ohio's 5th congressional district 1827-03-04 – 1833-03-03 | Succeeded by Thomas L. Hamer |
| Preceded by William K. Bond | Representative from Ohio's 7th congressional district 1841-03-04 – 1843-03-03 | Succeeded by Joseph J. McDowell |
