= Joseph J. McDowell =

American politician (1800–1877)

Member of the U.S. House of Representatives from Ohio's 7th district
- In office March 4, 1843 – March 3, 1847
- Preceded by: William Russell
- Succeeded by: Jonathan D. Morris

Member of the Ohio House of Representatives from the Fayette & Highland counties district
- In office December 3, 1832 – December 1, 1833
- Preceded by: David Reece
- Succeeded by: S. F. Geoman; R. D. Lilley

Member of the Ohio Senate from the Fayette & Highland counties district
- In office December 2, 1833 – December 6, 1835
- Preceded by: Moses Carothers
- Succeeded by: Jacob Kirby

Personal details
- Born: Joseph Jefferson McDowell; November 13, 1800 Burke County, North Carolina, U.S.
- Died: January 17, 1877 (aged 76) Hillsboro, Ohio, U.S.
- Resting place: Hillsboro Cemetery
- Party: Democratic

Joseph Jefferson McDowell (November 13, 1800 – January 17, 1877) was an American lawyer and politician who served as two-term a U.S. Representative from Ohio from 1843 to 1847. He was the son of Joseph McDowell, a prominent North Carolina politician who served in the Revolutionary War and was also a member of Congress.

== Biography ==
Born in Burke (now McDowell) County, North Carolina, McDowell moved to Kentucky with his mother in 1805 and to Augusta County, Virginia, in 1817. He pursued preparatory studies. He engaged in agricultural pursuits. He moved to Highland County, Ohio, in 1824 and continued agricultural pursuits. He moved to Hillsboro, Highland County, in 1829 and engaged in mercantile pursuits.

=== Political and military career ===
He served as member of the State house of representatives in 1832. He served in the State senate in 1833.

He was appointed brigadier general of the State militia in 1834. He studied law. He was admitted to the bar in 1835 and commenced the practice of his profession in Hillsboro, Ohio. He was an unsuccessful candidate for election in 1840 to the Twenty-seventh Congress. Ohio Presidential elector in 1832 for Andrew Jackson.

=== Congress ===
McDowell was elected as a Democrat to the Twenty-eighth and Twenty-ninth Congresses (March 4, 1843 – March 3, 1847). He served as chairman of the Committee on Accounts (Twenty-eighth Congress).

=== Later career and death ===
He resumed the practice of law and also engaged in agricultural pursuits. He died in Hillsboro, Ohio, January 17, 1877. He was interred in Hillsboro Cemetery.

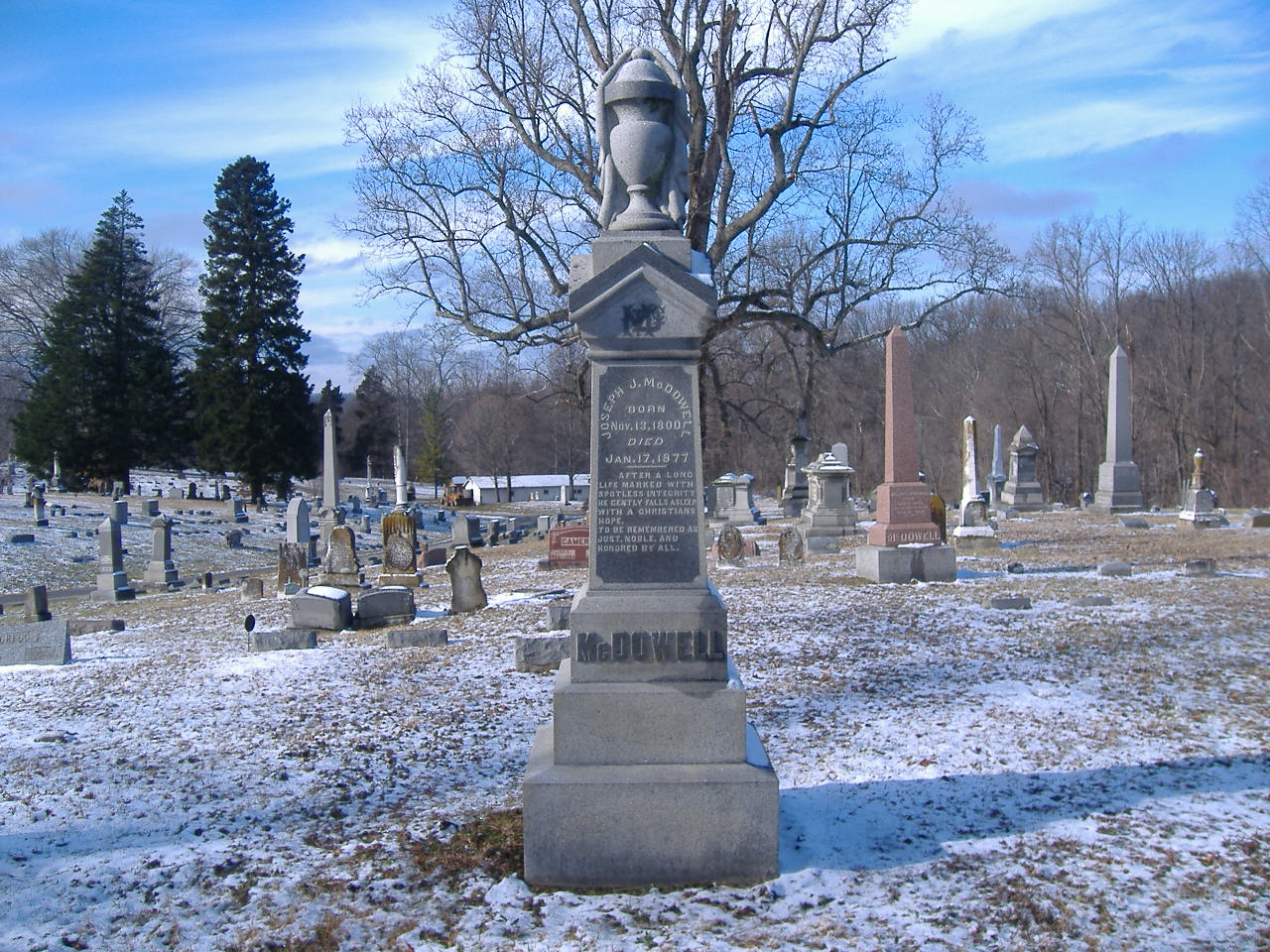
Headstone of Joseph J. McDowell in Hillsboro Cemetery.

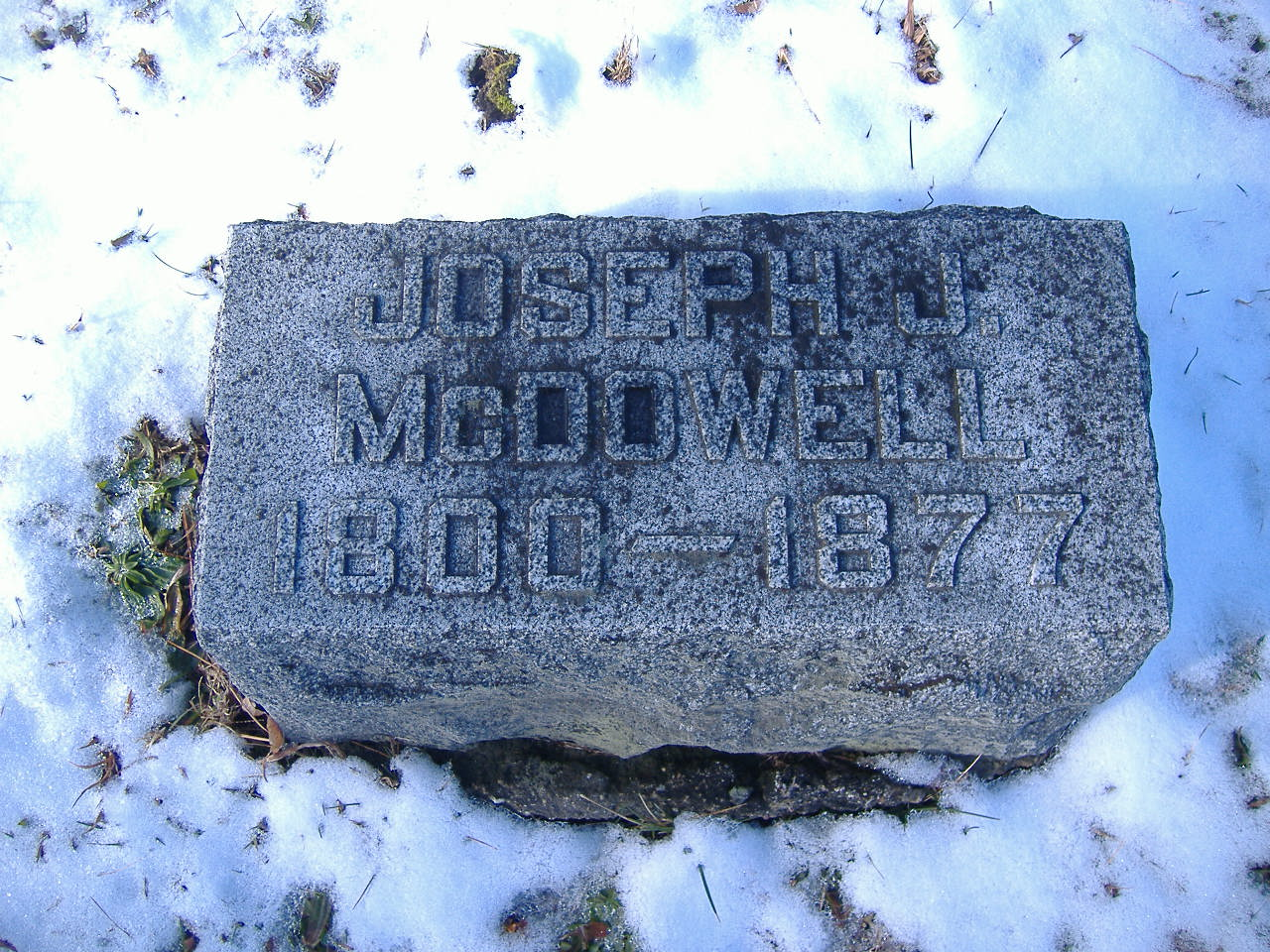
Gravemarker of Joseph J. McDowell in Hillsboro Cemetery.

== Sources ==
- United States Congress. "Joseph J. McDowell (id: M000425)". Biographical Directory of the United States Congress.
- Taylor, William Alexander; Taylor, Aubrey Clarence (1899). Ohio statesmen and annals of progress: from the year 1788 to the year 1900 ... Vol. 1. State of Ohio. p. 193.

U.S. House of Representatives
Preceded by William Russell	Member of the U.S. House of Representatives from Ohio's 7th congressional district 1843-1847	Succeeded by Jonathan D. Morris
