= Tragic Tales of Love and Life =

Compilation album by Cowboy Copas
- Released: September 1960
- Recorded: 1946–1955
- Genre: Country
- Label: King Records

Cowboy Copas chronology
Hymns and Sacred Songs by Cowboy Copas (1959)	Tragic Tales of Love and Life (1960)	Broken Hearted Melodies (1960)

Professional ratings
Review scores
Source	Rating
AllMusic	4.5/5 stars

Tragic Tales of Love and Life is a collection of recordings cut between 1946 and 1955 by Cowboy Copas.

== Track listing ==
No.	Title	Writer(s)	Length
1.	"Tragic Romance"	Louis Marshall Jones	2:42
2.	"It's Wrong to Love You But I Do"	Lloyd Copas; Jean Branch	2:38
3.	"Hangman's Boogie"	Larry Cassidy	2:34
4.	"The Postman Just Passes Me By"	Lloyd Copas; Hal Compton	2:49
5.	"As Advertised"	Lloyd Copas; Mann; Stewart	2:56
6.	"Ashamed of Myself"	Charles Singleton; Rose Marie McCoy	2:23
7.	"The Party's Over"	Boudleaux Bryant; Felice Bryant	2:37
8.	"Those Gone and Left Me Blues"	Jimmy Wakely; Johnny Bond	2:41
9.	"No More Roamin'"	Pee Wee King	2:45
10.	"Four Bare Walls and a Ceiling"	Lloyd Copas; Mann	2:38
11.	"Three Strikes and You're Out"	Lloyd Copas	2:42
12.	"An Old Farm for Sale"	Lloyd Copas; Taylor	2:56
13.	"Would Be Better for Both of Us"	Lloyd Copas; Eckler; Hughes	2:48
Total length:			35:09

- Track information and credits taken from the album's liner notes.
