= Alabam (song) =

Single by Cowboy Copas
- B-side: "I Can"
- Released: June 1960
- Genre: Country
- Length: 2:21
- Label: Starday
- Songwriter: Cowboy Copas

Cowboy Copas singles chronology
"'Tis Sweet to Be Remembered" (1952)	"Alabam" (1960)	"Flat Top" (1961)

"Alabam" is a 1960 song written and performed by Cowboy Copas.

== Chart performance ==
"Alabam" was the most successful release of Cowboy Copas and was his only single to hit the Hot 100, peaking at number sixty-three. On the country chart, "Alabam" was the sole number one single for Cowboy Copas, staying at the top spot for twelve weeks and spending thirty-four weeks on the chart.

Chart (1960)	Peak position
U.S. Billboard Hot C&W Sides	1
U.S. Billboard Hot 100	63

== Cover versions ==
- Guy Mitchell released a cover version in 1968. It reached No. 61 on the Hot Country Songs chart.
- Minnie Pearl in 1966
- Lynn Anderson in 1970
- Pat Boone
- Willie Nelson
- Bobby Vinton
- Hank Williams Jr.
