= John Wilson Campbell =

American judge (1782–1833)

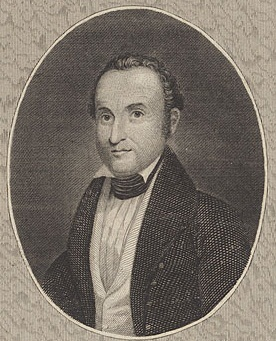

Judge of the United States District Court for the District of Ohio
- In office March 7, 1829 – September 24, 1833
- Appointed by: Andrew Jackson
- Preceded by: William Creighton Jr.
- Succeeded by: Benjamin Tappan

Member of the U.S. House of Representatives from Ohio
- In office March 4, 1817 – March 3, 1827
- Preceded by: John Alexander
- Succeeded by: William Russell
- Constituency: 2nd district (1817-1823); 5th district (1823-1827)

Personal details
- Born: John Wilson Campbell; February 23, 1782 Augusta County, Virginia, US
- Died: September 24, 1833 (aged 51) Delaware, Ohio, US
- Resting place: Old North Cemetery; Columbus, Ohio, US
- Party: Democratic-Republican; National Republican
- Education: read law

John Wilson Campbell (February 23, 1782 – September 24, 1833) was a United States representative from Ohio and a United States district judge of the United States District Court for the District of Ohio.

== Education and career ==
Born on February 23, 1782, near Miller's Iron Works in Augusta County, Virginia, Campbell attended the common schools, taught school, then read law in 1808. He was admitted to the bar and entered private practice in West Union, Ohio from 1808 to 1826. He was prosecutor for Adams County, Ohio from 1809 to 1817. He was a Justice of the Peace for Tiffin Township, Adams County, Ohio from 1809 to 1815. He was a member of the Ohio House of Representatives in 1810, and from 1815 to 1817.

== Congressional service ==
Campbell was elected as a Democratic-Republican from Ohio's 2nd congressional district and Ohio's 5th congressional district to the United States House of Representatives of the 15th through the 17th United States Congresses. reelected as a Jackson Democratic-Republican to the 18th United States Congress, and as a National Republican to the 19th United States Congress, serving from March 4, 1817, to March 3, 1827. He was Chairman of the Committee on Private Land Claims for the 16th through the 19th United States Congresses. He declined to be a candidate for renomination in 1826. Following his departure from Congress, Campbell resumed private practice in Brown County, Ohio from 1826 to 1829.

== Federal judicial service ==
Campbell was nominated by President Andrew Jackson on March 6, 1829, to a seat on the United States District Court for the District of Ohio vacated by Judge William Creighton Jr. He was confirmed by the United States Senate on March 7, 1829, and received his commission the same day. His service terminated on September 24, 1833, due to his death in Delaware, Delaware County, Ohio. He was interred in the North Graveyard in Columbus, Ohio.

== Sources ==
- United States Congress. "John Wilson Campbell (id: C000095)". Biographical Directory of the United States Congress.
- John Wilson Campbell at the Biographical Directory of Federal Judges, a publication of the Federal Judicial Center.
- This article incorporates public domain material from Biographical Directory of the United States Congress. Federal government of the United States.

Ohio House of Representatives
Preceded by William Russell; Abraham Shepherd	Representative from Adams County; 1810–1811; Served alongside: Abraham Shepherd	Succeeded by John Ellison Jr. William Russell
Preceded by John Ellison Jr. William Russell	Representative from Adams County; 1813–1814; Served alongside: John Ellison Jr.	Succeeded by Nathan Beasley; John Ellison Jr.
Preceded by Nathan Beasley; John Ellison Jr.	Representative from Adams County; 1815–1816; Served alongside: Josiah Lockhart	Succeeded by John Ellison Jr. Thomas Kirker
U.S. House of Representatives
Preceded by John Alexander	United States Representative from Ohio's 2nd congressional district 1817–1823	Succeeded by Thomas R. Ross
Preceded by Joseph Vance	United States Representative from Ohio's 5th congressional district 1823–1827	Succeeded by William Russell
Legal offices
Preceded by William Creighton Jr.	Judge of the United States District Court for the District of Ohio; 1829–1833	Succeeded by Benjamin Tappan
