= John Alexander (Ohio politician) =

American politician from Ohio (1777–1848)

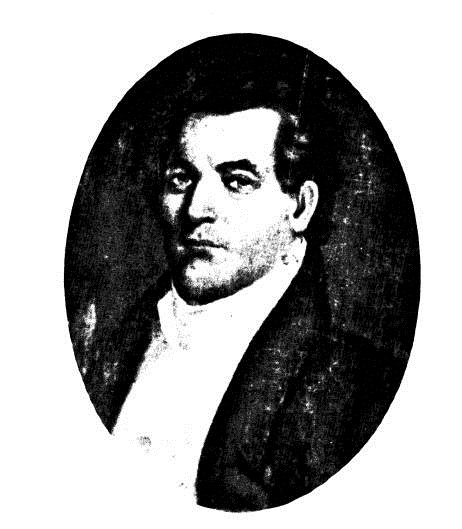

Member of the U.S. House of Representatives from Ohio's 2nd district
- In office March 4, 1813 – March 3, 1817
- Preceded by: new district
- Succeeded by: John Wilson Campbell

Member of the Ohio Senate from the Highland, Fayette County & Greene counties district
- In office December 2, 1822 – December 5, 1824 Serving with Allen Trimble
- Preceded by: Allen Trimble; William R. Cole
- Succeeded by: Allen Trimble; Samuel H. Hale

Personal details
- Born: April 16, 1777 South Carolina, US
- Died: June 28, 1848 (aged 71) Xenia, Ohio, US
- Resting place: Woodlawn Cemetery, Xenia
- Party: Democratic-Republican

John Alexander (April 16, 1777 – June 28, 1848) was a U.S. representative from Ohio.

Born at Crowsville, in the Spartanburg District, South Carolina, Alexander attended the public schools. He moved to Butler County, Ohio, and thence to Miamisburg, Montgomery County, in 1803. He studied law. He was admitted to the bar and commenced practice in 1804. He moved to Xenia, Ohio, in 1805 and continued his profession there, also practicing in Columbus, Chillicothe, and before the Supreme Court of the United States at Washington, D.C. He was appointed prosecuting attorney in 1808 and held that office until 1833, except during the time he was a Member of Congress.

Alexander was elected as a Democratic-Republican to the Thirteenth and Fourteenth Congresses (March 4, 1813 – March 3, 1817). He was an unsuccessful candidate for reelection in 1816 to the Fifteenth Congress. He resumed the practice of law at Xenia. He served as member of the State senate in 1822 and 1823. He retired from the practice of his profession in 1834. He died at Xenia, Ohio, June 28, 1848. He was interred in Woodlawn Cemetery.

== Sources ==
- United States Congress. "John Alexander (id: A000096)". Biographical Directory of the United States Congress.

U.S. House of Representatives
New district	United States Representative from Ohio's 2nd congressional district 1813-03-04 – 1817-03-03	Succeeded by John Wilson Campbell
Ohio Senate
Preceded by William R. Cole	Senator from Greene and Clinton Counties; 1822–1824	Succeeded by Samuel H. Hale
