= William K. Bond =

American politician (1792–1864)

Member of the U.S. House of Representatives from Ohio's 7th district
- In office March 4, 1835 – March 3, 1841
- Preceded by: William Allen
- Succeeded by: William Russell

Personal details
- Born: William Key Bond; October 2, 1792 St. Mary's County, Maryland, U.S.
- Died: February 17, 1864 (aged 71) Cincinnati, Ohio, U.S.
- Resting place: Spring Grove Cemetery
- Party: Anti-Jacksonian; Whig
- Education: Litchfield Law School

William Key Bond (October 2, 1792 – February 17, 1864) was a three-term U.S. Representative from Ohio from 1835 to 1841.

== Early life and career ==
Born in St. Mary's County, Maryland, Bond attended schools at Litchfield, Connecticut including Litchfield Law School where he studied law.

He moved to Chillicothe, Ohio in 1812. There, he joined a company of the Ohio Militia during the War of 1812.

In July 1813, he was part of the Expedition of Governor Meigs for the relief of Fort Meigs, which had been besieged for a second time by General Henry Procter and Shawnee chief Tecumseh. On the evening of the second day's march, his regimental commander Colonel Ferguson convened a court martial for a member of the regiment, and appointed Bond as Judge Advocate, in his first appearance as a lawyer.

He returned to Chillicothe and was admitted to the bar.

== Congress ==
Between March 4, 1835, and March 3, 1841, Bond served in the United States House of Representatives – as an Anti-Jacksonian to the Twenty-fourth Congress, and as a Whig to the Twenty-fifth and Twenty-sixth Congresses. During his final term, he served as chairman of the Committee on Public Expenditures. He declined to be a candidate for renomination to the Twenty-seventh Congress, instead moving to Cincinnati and continuing the practice of his profession.

== Later career and death ==
He was appointed surveyor of the port of Cincinnati by President Fillmore, serving in that role between May 2, 1849, and September 28, 1853.

Between 1859 and 1862, he was President of the Cincinnati and Zanesville Railroad.

He died in Cincinnati, Ohio on February 17, 1864, and was interred in Spring Grove Cemetery.

U.S. House of Representatives
Preceded by William Allen	Member of the U.S. House of Representatives from Ohio's 5th congressional district 1835-1841	Succeeded by William Russell
