= Blue Creek, Ohio =

Unincorporated community in Ohio, U.S.

Coordinates: 38°46′39″N 83°19′49″W

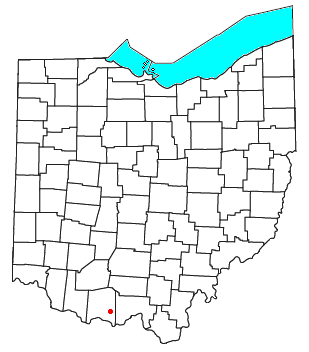
Location of Blue Creek, Ohio

Blue Creek is an unincorporated community in western Jefferson Township, Adams County, Ohio, United States. It is located along State Route 125. It has a post office with the ZIP code 45616.

== History ==
A post office was established at Blue Creek in 1844; it closed in 1907 and reopened in 1933. The community took its name from nearby Blue Creek. On August 9, 2007, the 110th United States Congress enacted a law to designate the facility of the United States Postal Service located at 20805 State Route 125 in Blue Creek as the "George B. Lewis Post Office Building".

== Notable people ==
- Cowboy Copas, country music singer
- Asa Jewett, basketball center for the 1999–2000 Ohio Bobcats men's basketball team.
- Philip Lewis Sr., member of the Ohio House of Representatives, settled here in 1796 and is buried in the local cemetery.
- Austin McHenry, baseball player for the St. Louis Cardinals, died at his home in Blue Creek at age 27 in 1922.
- Wiley Piatt, baseball player

== Gallery ==
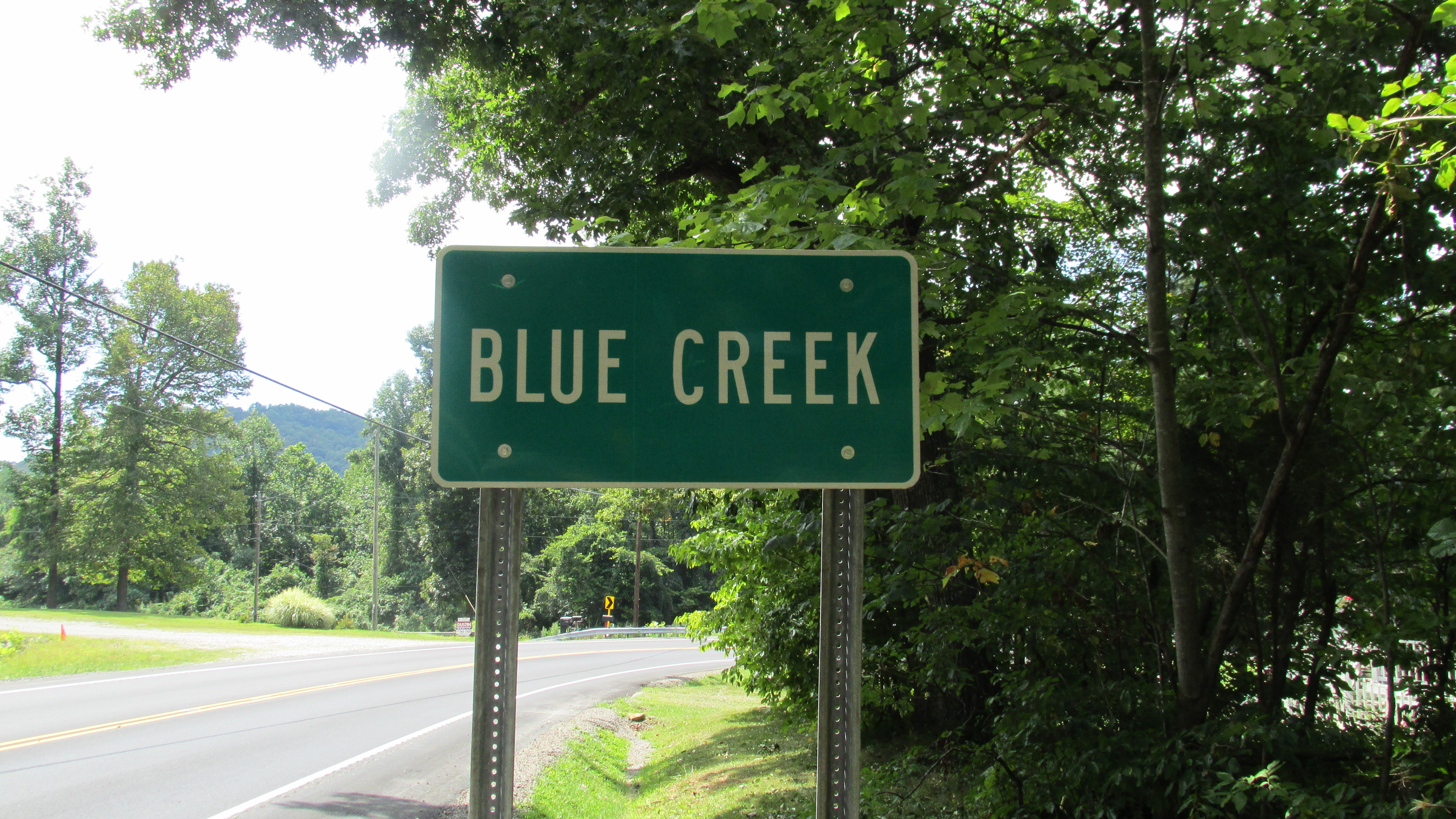
Blue Creek community sign

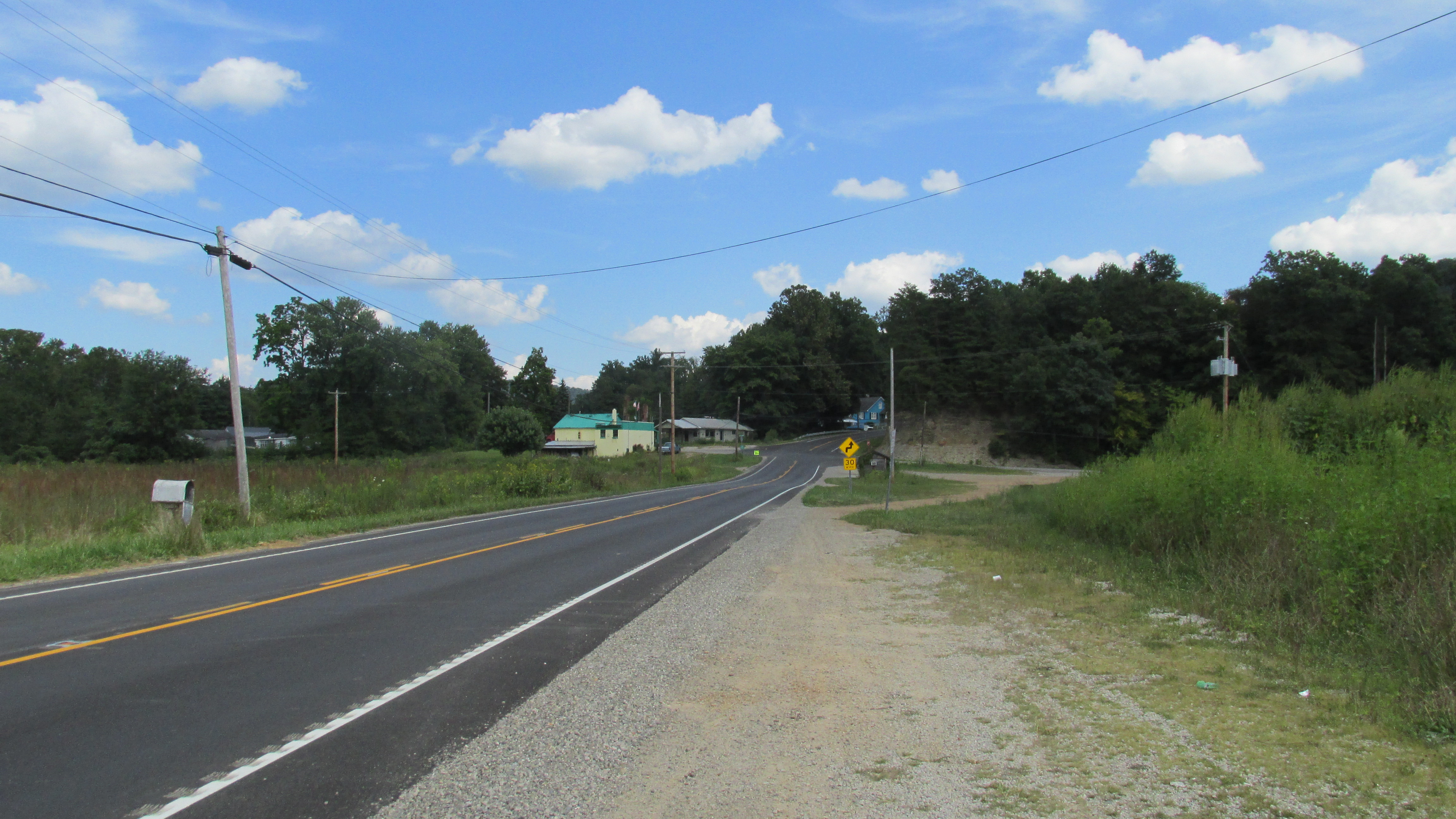
Looking east on Ohio Highway 125 in Blue Creek
