= Philip Lewis Sr. =

American politician

Member of the Ohio House of Representatives
- In office December 1804 – February 1808

Personal details
- Born: c. 1751 Fayette County, Pennsylvania
- Died: March 13, 1836 (aged 84–85) Jefferson Township, Adams County, Ohio
- Resting place: Blue Creek, Ohio

Military service
- Allegiance: United States
- Branch/service: Continental Army
- Rank: Wagon master
- Battles/wars: American Revolutionary War

Philip Lewis (c. 1751–1836) was an American pioneer, soldier, and politician. He was born in Fayette County, Pennsylvania, and was the son of Enoch Lewis, a frontiersman who settled on the Cheat River in southwestern Pennsylvania. Philip Lewis served as a wagon master during the Revolutionary War and was one of the early settlers of Jefferson Township, Ohio. He was appointed by the court to survey several roads. He represented Jefferson Township in the 3rd, 4th, 5th, and 6th legislative sessions of Ohio from December 1804 to February 1808. After his political career, he resumed work as a medical doctor until his death in Jefferson Township, Adams County, Ohio in 1836 at the age of 85.

== Biography ==
Enoch Lewis, the father of Philip, was born around 1727 in Wales and immigrated to America as a young man, settling on the Cheat River in southwestern Pennsylvania. He was a frontiersman who was killed by Natives in 1775. His son Robert also died at a young age by drowning in the Cheat River when he was 16. Philip Lewis was born in western Pennsylvania in 1751. In 1775, Philip married Betsey Wasson and had two children with her. During the Revolutionary War, Philip Lewis served as a Private and Wagon Master in Capt. John Heister's Company in Chester County, PA, and later in the 1st Pennsylvania Rifles.

In 1795, Philip Lewis moved to the Scioto Brush Creek Valley in Adams County, Ohio, where he made a living selling "Bear Bacon and Salt." He was one of the early settlers of Jefferson Township, Ohio, and in 1796, he settled on Blue Creek near where it empties into Scioto Brush Creek. He built a saw and grist mill in the same year and was appointed by the Court in 1799 to survey several roads. Philip Lewis married Mrs. McBride (maiden name Anderson) in Adams County, Ohio on March 2, 1805. Anderson was born in Ireland, and they had at least five children.

Philip Lewis was elected as the Representative of Jefferson Township in the 3rd, 4th, 5th, and 6th legislative sessions of Ohio from December 1804 to February 1808. Despite being reelected, Philip Lewis resigned from politics to resume his work as a physician. In his remaining years, Philip Lewis lived in Jefferson Township, Adams County, Ohio, and died on March 13, 1836, at the age of 85. He was buried in Copas Cemetery, Blue Creek, Adams County, Ohio, United States.
