= Cowboy Copas =

American country music singer (1913–1963)

Background information
- Born: Lloyd Estel Copas; July 15, 1913; Blue Creek, Ohio, U.S.
- Died: March 5, 1963 (aged 49) Camden, Tennessee, U.S.
- Genres: Country, honky-tonk
- Occupations: Singer, songwriter, musician
- Instrument: Guitar
- Years active: 1925–1963
- Labels: King Records; Dot Records; Starday Records

Lloyd Estel Copas (July 15, 1913 – March 5, 1963), known by his stage name Cowboy Copas, was an American country music singer. He was popular from the 1940s until his death in the 1963 plane crash that also killed country stars Patsy Cline and Hawkshaw Hawkins. Copas was a member of the Grand Ole Opry.

== Biography ==
Copas was born in 1913 in Blue Creek, Ohio, United States. He began performing locally at age 14, and appeared on WLW-AM and WKRC-AM in Cincinnati during the 1930s. In 1940, he moved to Knoxville, Tennessee, where he performed on WNOX-AM with his band, the Gold Star Rangers.

In 1943, Copas achieved national fame when he replaced Eddy Arnold as a vocalist in the Pee Wee King band, and began performing on the Grand Ole Opry. His first solo single, "Filipino Baby", released by King Records in 1946, hit number four on the Billboard country chart, and sparked the most successful period of his career.

While continuing to appear on the Opry, Copas recorded several other hits during the late 1940s and early 1950s, including "Signed Sealed and Delivered", "The Tennessee Waltz", "Tennessee Moon", "Breeze", "I'm Waltzing with Tears in My Eyes", "Candy Kisses", "Hangman's Boogie", and "The Strange Little Girl". Copas' 1952 single, "'Tis Sweet to Be Remembered", reached number eight on the Billboard country chart, but it was his final top-40 hit for eight years.

Although Copas did not maintain his popularity of the late 1940s through the next decade, he continued to perform regularly at the Grand Ole Opry, and appeared on ABC-TV's Ozark Jubilee. After a lackluster partnership with Dot Records, Copas surged to the top of the charts again in 1960 with the biggest hit of his career, "Alabam", which remained number one for three months. Other major hits during his successful period with Starday Records in the early 1960s, including "Flat Top" and a remake of "Signed, Sealed And Delivered", held promising implications for the future of his career.

=== Aircraft accident ===
On March 3, 1963, Copas, Patsy Cline, Hawkshaw Hawkins, and others performed at a benefit concert at the Soldiers and Sailors Memorial Hall in Kansas City, Kansas, for the family of disc jockey Cactus Jack Call, who had died the previous December in an automobile accident.

On March 5, they left for Nashville in a Piper Comanche piloted by Copas' son-in-law (and Cline's manager), Randy Hughes. After stopping to refuel in Dyersburg, Tennessee, the craft took off at 6:07 pm CT. The plane flew into severe weather and crashed at 6:29 pm in a forest near Camden, Tennessee, 90 miles from their destination, with no survivors. A stone marker, dedicated on July 6, 1996, marks the location of the crash.

Copas was buried at Forest Lawn Memorial Gardens in Goodlettsville, Tennessee, in "Music Row" with Hawkins and other country music stars.

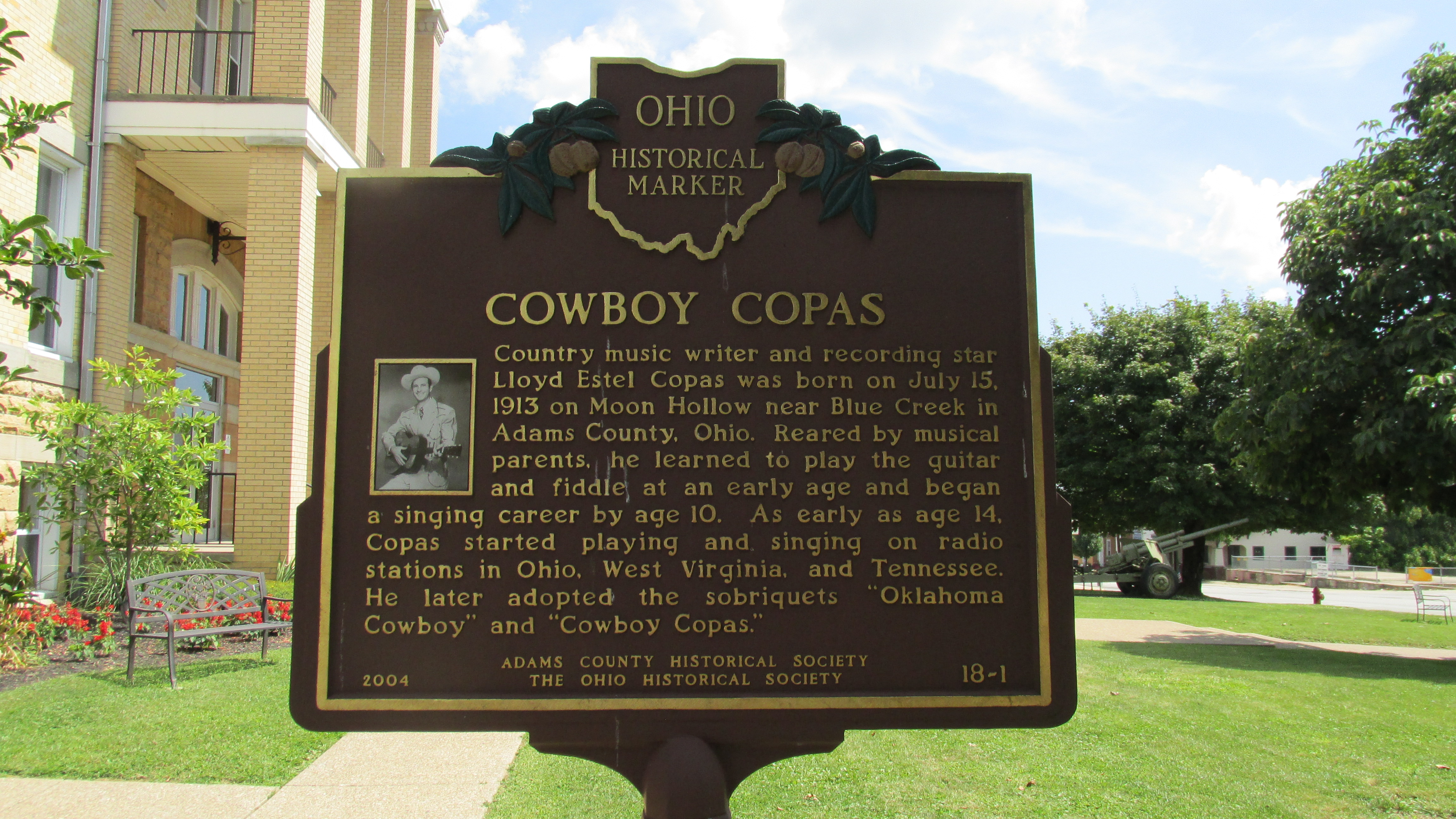
Copas Ohio historical marker at the Adams County Courthouse in West Union, Ohio

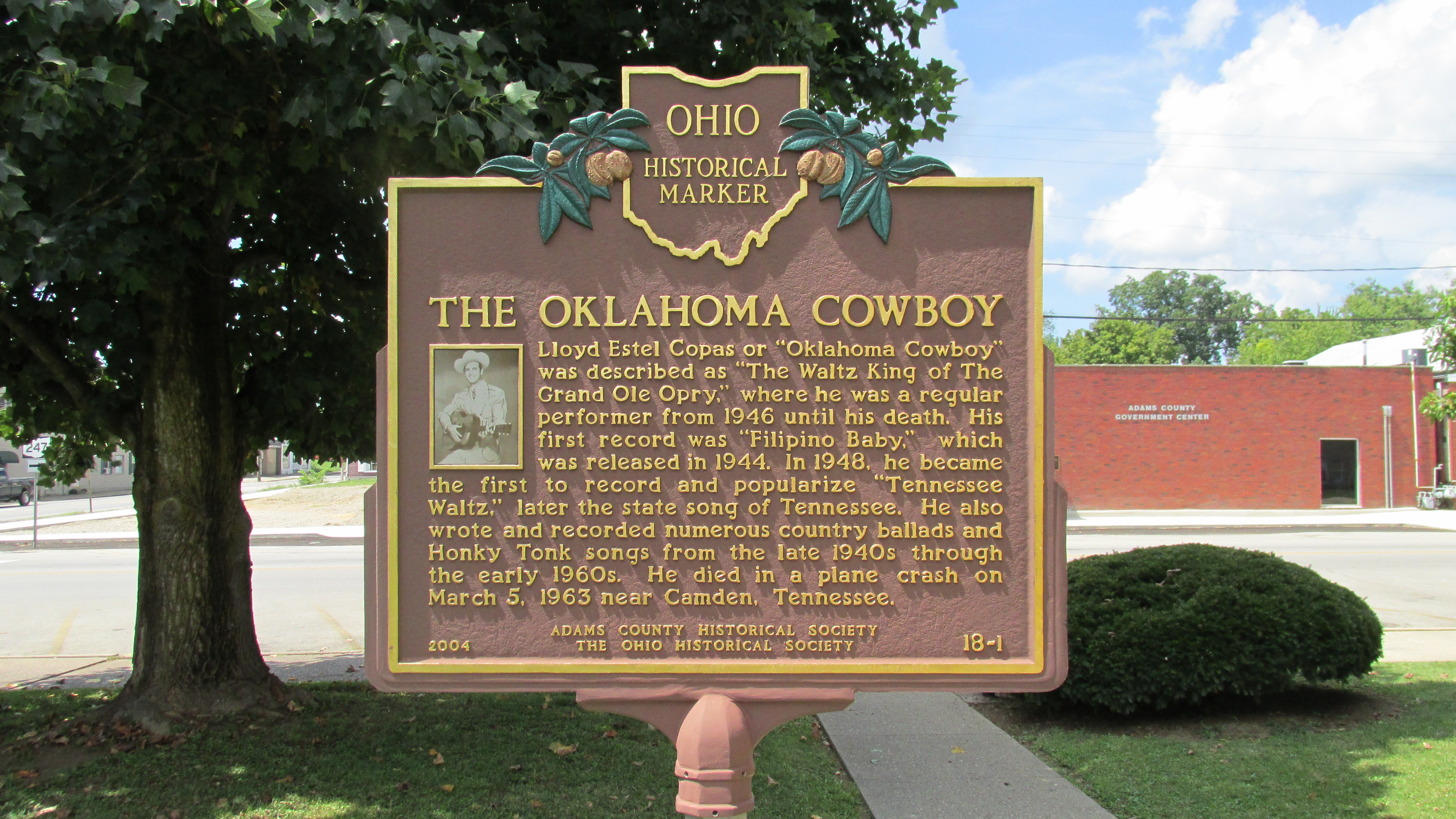
Reverse side of marker

== Discography ==
=== King Records ===
- Sings His All-Time Hits (1957)
- Hymns and Sacred Songs (1959)
- Tragic Tales of Love and Life (1960)
- Broken Hearted Melodies (1960)
- The Country Gentleman of Song (1963)
- As You Remember (1963)
- The Legend of Cowboy Copas and Hawkshaw Hawkins No. 2 (1963) with Hawkshaw Hawkins
- In Memory (1963) with Hawkshaw Hawkins
- Tragic Romance (1969)

=== Starday Records ===
- All Time Country Music Great (1960)
- Inspirational Songs by Cowboy Copas (1961)
- Songs That Made Him Famous (1961)
- Mister Country Music (1962)
- Opry Star Spotlight on Cowboy Copas (1962)
- Country Music Entertainer No. 1 (1962)
- Beyond the Sunset (1963)
- The Unforgettable Cowboy Copas (1963)
- Star of the Grand Ole Opry (1963)
- The Late and Great (1964)
- Cowboy Copas and His Friends (1964)
- The Legend Lives On (1965)
- The Cowboy Copas Story (1965)
- Shake a Hand (1966)
- Signed Sealed and Delivered (1967)
- Filipino Baby (1970)
- 16 Greatest Hits Of Cowboy Copas (1970)

=== Imperial Records ===
- Songs of the Old West 1 (1961)

=== Hilltop Records ===
- Gone But Not Forgotten (1965) with Patsy Cline & Johnny Horton
- A Satisfied Mind (1966)

=== Singles ===
Year	Single	Chart Positions	
Year	Single	US Country	US
1946	"Filipino Baby"	4	—
1948	"Signed Sealed and Delivered"	2	—
1948	"Tennessee Waltz"	3	—
1948	"Tennessee Moon"	7	—
1948	"Breeze"	12	—
1949	"I'm Waltzing with Tears in My Eyes"	12	—
1949	"Candy Kisses"	5	—
1949	"Hangman's Boogie"	14	—
1951	"The Strange Little Girl"	5	—
1952	"'Tis Sweet to Be Remembered"	8	—
1960	"Alabam"	1	63
1961	"Flat Top"	9	—
1961	"Sunny Tennessee"	12	—
1961	"Signed Sealed and Delivered" (re-recording)	10	—
1963	"Goodbye Kisses"	12	—
