= Alexander Campbell (Ohio politician) =

American Republican politician

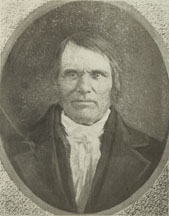

United States Senator from Ohio
- In office December 11, 1809 – March 3, 1813
- Preceded by: Stanley Griswold
- Succeeded by: Jeremiah Morrow

7th Speaker of the Ohio House of Representatives
- In office December 5, 1808 – December 3, 1809
- Preceded by: Philemon Beecher
- Succeeded by: Edward Tiffin

Member of the Ohio House of Representatives
- In office 1807–1809
- Preceded by: Philip Lewis; James Scott; Abraham Shepherd
- Succeeded by: William Russell; Abraham Shepherd
- Constituency: Scioto County (1807-1808); Adams County (1807-1809)
- In office 1819–1820
- Preceded by: Henry Chapman; John Shaw
- Succeeded by: Thomas Morris
- Constituency: Clermont County

Member of the Ohio Senate from Brown County
- In office 1822–1824
- Preceded by: Nathaniel Beasley
- Succeeded by: Unknown

Personal details
- Born: 1779 Frederick County, Virginia
- Died: November 5, 1857 (aged 77–78) Ripley, Ohio, U.S.
- Party: Democratic-Republican

Alexander Campbell (1779 – November 5, 1857) was a National Republican politician from Ohio. He served in the United States Senate.

Born in Frederick County, Virginia, Campbell moved to eastern Tennessee and then to Kentucky with his parents. After studying medicine at Transylvania University, Campbell moved to Ohio in 1803, settling in Adams County a year later. He served in the Ohio House of Representatives from 1807 until 1809-12-12, when he resigned his position to be a U.S. Senator. An early anti-slavery campaigner, he had been unsuccessful in his candidacy for the U.S. Senate in 1808, but won a special election to the state's other seat a few months later and served from 1809 to 1813. He again served in the State House in 1819 and from 1832 to 1833, and in the Ohio State Senate from 1822 to 1824. He ran unsuccessfully for the governorship in 1826.

Ohio Presidential elector in 1820 for James Monroe. Ohio Presidential elector in 1836 for William Henry Harrison.

Political offices
Preceded by Philemon Beecher	Speaker of the Ohio House of Representatives; 1808-12-05 – 1809-12-03	Succeeded by Edward Tiffin
Ohio House of Representatives
Preceded by Philip Lewis; James Scott; Abraham Shepherd	Representative from Adams and Scioto Counties; 1807–1808; Served alongside: Andrew Ellison; Philip Lewis, Jr.	District eliminated
New district	Representative from Adams County; 1808–1809-12-12; Served alongside: Andrew Ellison (1808–1809), Abraham Shepherd (1809)	Succeeded by William Russell; Abraham Shepherd
Preceded by Henry Chapman; John Shaw	Representative from Clermont County; 1819–1820; Served alongside: David Morris	Succeeded by Thomas Morris
U.S. Senate
Preceded by Stanley Griswold	U.S. senator (Class 3) from Ohio; 1809-12-11 – 1813-03-03; Served alongside: Return J. Meigs, Jr., Thomas Worthington	Succeeded by Jeremiah Morrow
Preceded by Elisha Mathewson	Most senior living U.S. senator (Sitting or former); 1853-10-14 – 1857-11-05	Succeeded by George M. Bibb
Ohio Senate
Preceded by Nathaniel Beasley	Senator from Brown County; 1822–1824	Unknown
