= Wagon master =

Person hired to oversee the transportation of a group of wagons

A wagon master was the person hired to oversee the transportation of a group of wagons. On the American frontier, the term usually applies to the person responsible for assisting groups of immigrants or pioneers from the eastern US to the western US. Wagon masters were also hired to oversee shipments of cargo or mail. A group of wagons traveling together were referred to as a "train".

The trip across the western US by wagon was long and very difficult. Typically, a wagon train would travel at around two miles an hour, which would only permit the train to average a little over ten miles a day. Therefore, the 2,000 mile journey from Missouri to California or Oregon would take about five to six months depending on weather or other difficulties.

== Responsibilities ==
The job of wagon master was very important as the difference between a good and skilled wagon master and one who wasn't was often the difference between life and death. The wagon master had many responsibilities.

It was vital that the wagon master be a knowledgeable and skilled individual in order for the people and goods to travel safely across the country. The wagon master also had to be familiar with the trail that they would be traveling. He would have to know what the terrain was going to be that the wagons were going to travel over, where the wagons could go and where they would not be able to go. It was important that the wagon master also have experience at such things as:

- Survival
- Fighting and warfare – to fend off attacks
- Animal husbandry – to care for sick and injured animals
- Mechanics – to repair broken wagons
- Hunting - to supplement the immigrant's diet along the journey
- Climate and weather – so he could determine when a storm would make travel too dangerous
- Terrain – to know where to go that a wagon could get through
- Medical and dental knowledge
- Negotiating and counseling to handle disputes between land owners, outlaws, Native Americans, or between those within the group

Most initial wagon masters were mountain men who knew the terrain and had learned many of the skills that were required to lead a group of unskilled travelers.

== Operations ==
Crossing the continent by wagon was an extremely expensive enterprise. It was estimated that the journey cost a family about $1,000 (approximately equivalent to $35,000 in 2025). They had to have special wagons that could handle the weight and rough use. These wagons typically would cost about $400 (approximately equivalent to $14,000 in 2025). The wagons had wooden hoops that went from one side to the other which were covered by a canvas top which would be waterproofed with linseed oil. The canvas protected the migrants and their possessions from weather and the sun.

The wagons would be packed with food supplies, cooking equipment, water kegs, and other things needed for a long journey. Knowing that this was the only chance they had to transport their goods and that they may not be able to get what they needed where they were going, the pioneers usually over-packed their wagons. This often led to the wagons breaking down and the draw animals being overly fatigued. It was common to see routes along the wagon trails littered with household items that had been cast off along the journey.

When the wagon train would stop for any length of time, at night for instance, the wagons were arranged, end to end, in a circular or square pattern. This served two purposes, one as a corral for the animals and secondly, as protection against a possible attacks.

The main cause of death on the overland trails was "accidental" shootings, although it is unclear how many were truly accidental. The second most prevalent reason for death was drowning, as the immigrants would have to cross dangerous rivers with their animals and wagons. Other reasons for people dying on the trip included sickness, disease, fighting, wild animals, and old age.

== History ==
The Transcontinental railroad put an eventual end to migration by wagon as it was faster, and safer.
