= Abraham Shepherd =

American politician

Speaker of the Ohio Senate
- In office December 2, 1816 – December 6, 1818
- Preceded by: Peter Hitchcock
- Succeeded by: Robert Lucas
- In office December 4, 1826 – December 2, 1827
- Preceded by: Allen Trimble
- Succeeded by: Samuel Wheeler

5th Speaker of the Ohio House of Representatives
- In office December 1, 1806 – December 6, 1807
- Preceded by: John Sloane
- Succeeded by: Philemon Beecher

Personal details
- Born: August 13, 1776 Shepherdstown, Virginia
- Died: January 16, 1847 (aged 70) Putnam County, Illinois, U.S.
- Party: Democratic-Republican; Democratic
- Spouses: Margaret Moore; Harriet Kincaid
- Children: twelve

Military service
- Allegiance: United States
- Branch/service: Ohio Militia
- Rank: captain
- Battles/wars: War of 1812

Abraham Shepherd (1776–1847) was a politician from Ohio, United States who was a leader of both houses of the Ohio General Assembly early in the 19th century.

== Early life ==
Abraham Shepherd was born August 13, 1776, in Shepherdstown, Virginia, (now West Virginia). He was among the seven children of John Shepherd and Martha Nelson Shepherd. John Shepherd joined the 4th Virginia Infantry during the American Revolutionary War, and also operated a mill, teaching the business to his son. In 1787, the family moved to Wheeling Creek, and to Limestone, Kentucky, in 1793. They stayed two years before locating in Red Oak, then in Adams County in the Northwest Territory.

In 1799, Abraham Shepherd married Margaret Moore, lived at Red Oak a short time before building a brick house and mill, later known as Pilson's Mill, on Eagle Creek. He also laid out and dedicated a cemetery, known as Baird's Cemetery.

== Political ==
In October, 1803, Shepherd was elected one of three Adams County representatives in the Ohio House of Representatives, and was seated December 5, 1803. He was re-elected in 1804, 1805, and 1806, serving as Speaker during the 1806-07 session. In 1809, Shepherd was again elected to the Ohio House, and he was re-elected in 1810.

During the War of 1812, Shepherd served as captain of a company in the Ohio Militia during 1812 and 1813.

Shepherd returned to the legislature in 1815, being elected to the Ohio State Senate for a two-year term. He served as Speaker of the Senate during the 1816-'7 session. He was elected to another two-year term in 1817, and again was elected Speaker during the 1817-'8 session. In December 1817, he secured the passage of the act creating Brown County, Ohio, from Adams and Clermont, and was then a resident of the new county. He was also a Presidential elector for James Monroe in 1816.

In 1818, the first court was held in Brown County at Ripley, with Joshua Collett presiding. Shepherd was appointed clerk-of-courts for a seven-year term.

Shepherd returned to the Senate in 1825, representing Adams and Brown counties, and during the 1826-'7 session was again Speaker of the Senate. In 1825, the state moved to an Ad valorem tax system, and the State Board of Equalization was created. Shepherd represented the 5th congressional district on the board.

== Personal ==
Shepherd operated Pilson's Mill on Eagle Creek, now in Jefferson Township, Brown County, Ohio, until 1817, when he moved to Ripley, Ohio. He built a mill, operated by steam as early as 1825, at Red Oak, and was also a pork-packer. He was master of a masonic lodge at Ripley in 1818, and was an elder of the Presbyterian Church, and delegate at the Chillicothe Presbytery in 1823, 1830 and 1832.

Shepherd's first wife died in 1818, after having ten children. He married Harriet Kincade on October 19, 1819, and had two more children. In 1834, he had financial reverses, and moved to Putnam County, Illinois, where he died January 16, 1847.

While a Democratic-Republican and later Democrat, Shepherd abandoned the party later on because of slavery, and became an abolitionist.

== Notes ==
Ohio Senate
Preceded by Thomas Kirker	Senator from Adams County; December 4, 1815-December 5, 1819; Served alongside: Nathaniel Beasley (1818-'9)	Succeeded by William Russell; Nathaniel Beasley
Preceded by Thomas Kirker	Senator from Adams & Brown counties December 5, 1825-December 2, 1827	Succeeded by John Fisher
Ohio House of Representatives
Preceded by Thomas Kirker; Joseph Lucas; William Russell	Representative from Adams County; December 5, 1803-December 6, 1807; Served alongside: Daniel Collier (1803-'4) (1805-'6); John Wright (1803-'4); Ph. Lewis, Jr. (1804-'5); Thomas Waller (1804-'5); James Scott (1806-'7)	Succeeded by Andrew Ellison; Alexander Campbell
Preceded by Andrew Ellison; Alexander Campbell	Representative from Adams County; December 4, 1809-December 1, 1811; Served alongside: Alexander Campbell (1809-'10); John Wilson Campbell (1810-'1)	Succeeded by John Ellison, Jr. William Russell
