= Matthias Corwin =

American politician

9th and 11th Speaker of the Ohio House of Representatives
- In office December 4, 1815 – December 1, 1816
- Preceded by: John Pollock
- Succeeded by: Thomas Kirker
- In office December 2, 1811 – December 6, 1812
- Preceded by: Edward Tiffin
- Succeeded by: John Pollock

Member of the Ohio House of Representatives from Warren County
- In office 1804–1816

Personal details
- Born: February 19, 1761 Morris County, New Jersey, U.S.
- Died: September 4, 1829 (aged 68)
- Party: Democratic-Republican

Matthias Corwin (February 19, 1761 – September 4, 1829) was an American politician. Born in Morris County, New Jersey, Corwin and his family moved to Ohio in 1798. Corwin served in the Ohio House of Representatives and served as speaker. His son was US Senator, Ohio Governor and US Secretary of the Treasury Thomas Corwin. Corwin died in Lebanon, Ohio. He was a Presidential elector in 1812 for the James Madison ticket.
