= Philemon Beecher =

American politician

Member of the U.S. House of Representatives from Ohio
- In office March 4, 1817 – March 3, 1821
- Preceded by: James Kilbourne
- Succeeded by: Joseph Vance
- Constituency: 5th district
- In office March 4, 1823 – March 3, 1829
- Preceded by: New District
- Succeeded by: William W. Irvin
- Constituency: 9th district

6th Speaker of the Ohio House of Representatives
- In office December 7, 1807 – December 4, 1808
- Preceded by: Abraham Shepherd
- Succeeded by: Alexander Campbell

Member of the Ohio House of Representatives for Fairfield County
- In office 1803-1808

Personal details
- Born: March 19, 1776 Oxford, Connecticut Colony, British America
- Died: November 30, 1839 (aged 63) Lancaster, Ohio, U.S.
- Resting place: Elmwood Cemetery
- Party: Federalist; Democratic-Republican; Adams
- Spouse: Susan Gillespie

Philemon Beecher (March 19, 1776 – November 30, 1839) was an Anglo-American attorney and legislator who was a member of the United States House of Representatives from Ohio.

== Biography ==
Philemon Beecher was born in Oxford in the Connecticut Colony, the son of Abraham Beecher and Desire Tolles. Philemon Beecher received a classical education, read law and was admitted to the bar.

Beecher moved to Lancaster, Ohio, in 1801 and continued the practice of law, being admitted to the bar while Ohio was still the Northwest Territory. He was the leading lawyer of the Lancaster bar for twenty-five years. It was in his office that lawyer and political figure Thomas Ewing studied law. Beecher was often a barrister at the courthouse in Marietta, Ohio.

Beecher was a member of Scioto Lodge No 2 Free and Accepted Masons in Ohio. Philemon Beecher made the acquaintance of Susan Gillespie, a daughter of Neil Gillespie of Brownsville, Pennsylvania when she came to Lancaster on a visit to her sister, Mrs. Hugh Boyle. Philemon Beecher and Susan Gillespie were married in Pennsylvania in 1803 or 1804.

Originally a Federalist, Beecher was elected a member of the Ohio House of Representatives in 1803 and again in the three sessions from 1805 to 1807, serving as speaker in 1807. His swarthy complexion earned him the sobriquet of the "Black Knight."

In 1805, he opposed a Resolution commending the United States government for the Louisiana Purchase, but the Resolution passed by one vote. Beecher was a witness on behalf of Fairfield County, Ohio Common Pleas Judge William W. Irvin at the latter's impeachment trial in 1806. Irvin was married to the sister of Beecher's future wife. Irvin went on to follow Beecher in the Ohio legislature, in Congress and was later on the Ohio Supreme Court.

Philemon Beecher was unsuccessful as a candidate for United States Senator in 1807 against Edward Tiffin. That year he also failed to win a place on the bench as judge of the Ohio Supreme Court. Philemon Beecher was appointed a major general in the Ohio militia.

The Lancaster, Ohio Bank was chartered in 1816 with Beecher as president for one year. He continued as a director of the bank for many years.

Philemon Beecher was elected as a Federalist from Ohio's 5th congressional district to the Fifteenth and Sixteenth Congresses. He was an unsuccessful candidate for reelection in 1820.

Described in later years as an old-line Whig, in 1822, Philemon Beecher was elected as an Adams-Clay Republican from the new Ohio 9th district to the Eighteenth Congress, and an Adams candidate to the Nineteenth and Twentieth Congresses. In the 1824 battle between Andrew Jackson and John Quincy Adams for Ohio's electoral votes, he voted for Adams.

In 1826, Philemon Beecher participated as a managing member of The Colonization Society in Lancaster, an organization promoting repatriation to Africa as an alternative to slavery. He was an unsuccessful candidate for reelection in 1828 when he was defeated by his brother-in-law, William W. Irvin.

Philemon Beecher returned to Lancaster and continued the practice of law until his death there, aged 63, November 30, 1839. He and his wife are interred in Elmwood Cemetery.

Political offices
Preceded by Abraham Shepherd	Speaker of the Ohio House of Representatives; 1807–1808	Succeeded by Alexander Campbell
Ohio House of Representatives
Preceded by David Reece; William Trimble	Representative from Fairfield County; 1803–1804; Served alongside: William Gass	Succeeded by William Gass; David Reece
Preceded by William Gass; David Reece	Representative from Fairfield County; 1805–1808; Served alongside: Robert Cloud (1805–1806), William W. Irvin (1806–1808)	Succeeded by Elijah B. Merwin; Patrick Owings
U.S. House of Representatives
Preceded by James Kilbourne	Member of the U.S. House of Representatives from Ohio's 5th congressional district 1817–1821	Succeeded by Joseph Vance
New district	Representative from Ohio's 9th congressional district 1823–1829	Succeeded by William W. Irvin
