= National Register of Historic Places listings in Warren County, Ohio =

Location of Warren County in Ohio

This is intended to be a complete list of the properties and districts on the National Register of Historic Places in Warren County, Ohio, United States. The locations of National Register properties and districts for which the latitude and longitude coordinates are included below, may be seen in an online map.

There are 54 properties and districts listed on the National Register in the county, including 1 National Historic Landmark.

This National Park Service list is complete through NPS recent listings posted April 10, 2026.

== Current listings ==
	Name on the Register	Image	Date listed	Location	City or town	Description
1	Armco Park Mound I		May 29, 1975 (#75001550)	Along Shaker Creek at Greentree Corners; 39°27′46″N 84°16′10″W	Turtlecreek Township	
2	Armco Park Mound II		May 29, 1975 (#75001551)	Along Shaker Creek at Greentree Corners; 39°27′45″N 84°16′10″W	Turtlecreek Township	
3	Bone Mound II	Bone Mound II	July 15, 1974 (#74001643)	Northwestern quarter of the southwestern quarter of Section 9 of Wayne Township, northwest of Oregonia; 39°28′54″N 84°07′20″W	Wayne Township	
4	Bone Stone Graves	Bone Stone Graves	July 15, 1974 (#74001644)	Northwestern quarter of the southwestern quarter of Section 9 of Wayne Township, northwest of Oregonia; 39°28′53″N 84°07′19″W	Wayne Township	
5	Charles Butler House	Charles Butler House	April 29, 1982 (#82003664)	13 E. Jackson St. 39°33′51″N 84°17′59″W	Franklin	
6	Goldsmith Coffeen House	Goldsmith Coffeen House	October 10, 1984 (#84000165)	419 Cincinnati Ave. 39°25′47″N 84°12′55″W	Lebanon	
7	Corwin Council House and Jail	Corwin Council House and Jail	May 30, 2001 (#01000589)	946 Harveysburg Rd. 39°31′29″N 84°04′40″W	Corwin	
8	Corwin House	Corwin House	October 10, 1984 (#84000166)	1255 State Route 48; 39°27′16″N 84°12′19″W	Lebanon	Different from governor Thomas Corwin House which is at 210 W Main Street. This house was occupied by the governors cousins.
9	Corwin-Bolin House	Corwin-Bolin House	October 10, 1984 (#84000167)	1443 State Route 48; 39°27′20″N 84°12′18″W	Lebanon	
10	Jonathan Crane Farm	Jonathan Crane Farm	February 17, 1978 (#78002202)	South of Franklin on State Route 741; 39°29′11″N 84°15′09″W	Clearcreek Township	
11	Crossed Keys Tavern	Crossed Keys Tavern	October 21, 1976 (#76001542)	East of Lebanon on State Route 350; 39°24′24″N 84°06′12″W	Turtlecreek Township	
12	Daniel L. Deardoff House	Daniel L. Deardoff House	May 31, 1984 (#84003810)	4374 Union Rd., south of Franklin; 39°30′26″N 84°18′57″W	Franklin Township	No longer extant per Google Street View.
13	Henry Decker Farmstead	Henry Decker Farmstead	September 8, 2000 (#00001063)	2595 W. Lower Springboro Rd., southwest of Springboro; 39°32′47″N 84°14′41″W	Clearcreek Township	
14	East End Historic District	East End Historic District	October 10, 1984 (#84000419)	Roughly bounded by South, Mound, Pleasant, and Cherry Sts. 39°26′04″N 84°12′07″W	Lebanon	
15	John Ferney House	John Ferney House	October 10, 1984 (#84000423)	475 Glosser Rd. 39°25′40″N 84°13′33″W	Lebanon	
16	Floraville Historic District	Floraville Historic District	October 10, 1984 (#84002102)	Roughly bounded by Cincinnati and Orchard Aves. and East and Keever Sts. 39°25′46″N 84°12′32″W	Lebanon	
17	Fort Ancient	Fort Ancient	October 15, 1966 (#66000625)	State Route 350, east of Lebanon; 39°24′29″N 84°05′21″W	Washington Township	
18	Franklin Historic District		May 1, 2023 (#100008886)	Roughly Bounded by West 1st, South. Main, and Sixth Sts., and the Great Miami R. 39°33′36″N 84°18′18″W	Franklin	
19	Glendower	Glendower	November 10, 1970 (#70000521)	U.S. Route 42 (Cincinnati Ave.); 39°25′47″N 84°12′36″W	Lebanon	
20	Golden Lamb	Golden Lamb	January 12, 1978 (#78002204)	27-31 S. Broadway; 39°26′01″N 84°12′30″W	Lebanon	
21	Elizabeth Harvey Free Negro School	Elizabeth Harvey Free Negro School	November 17, 1977 (#77001089)	North St. 39°30′12″N 84°00′25″W	Harveysburg	
22	Hatton Farm	Hatton Farm	March 29, 1978 (#78002203)	East of central Harveysburg on State Route 73; 39°30′01″N 84°00′02″W	Harveysburg	
23	Hill-Kinder Mound	Hill-Kinder Mound	November 5, 1971 (#71000657)	Northeast of downtown Franklin; 39°34′29″N 84°16′40″W	Franklin	
24	Hunt-Forman Farm	Hunt-Forman Farm	June 16, 2004 (#04000607)	2945 N. State Route 741, south of Franklin; 39°28′56″N 84°15′17″W	Turtlecreek Township	
25	Kern Effigy (33WA372)	Kern Effigy (33WA372)	July 21, 1986 (#86001922)	Along the Little Miami River on the grounds of YMCA Camp Kern, 5291 State Route 350; 39°24′19″N 84°06′21″W	Turtlecreek Township	
26	Ahimaaz King House	Ahimaaz King House	December 19, 2008 (#08001199)	1720 E. King Ave. in Kings Mills; 39°21′29″N 84°14′44″W	Deerfield Township	
27	Landen Mounds I and II	Landen Mounds I and II	May 27, 1975 (#75001549)	Near Socialville-Foster Rd. by the northern side of Landen Lake, west of Foster; 39°19′16″N 84°16′29″W	Deerfield Township	
28	Lebanon Academy	Lebanon Academy	October 10, 1984 (#84000427)	190 New St. 39°26′20″N 84°12′17″W	Lebanon	
29	Lebanon Cemetery Entrance Arch	Lebanon Cemetery Entrance Arch	October 18, 1984 (#84000157)	Hunter St. 39°26′13″N 84°12′49″W	Lebanon	
30	Lebanon Cemetery Superintendent's House	Lebanon Cemetery Superintendent's House	October 18, 1984 (#84000159)	416 W. Silver St. 39°26′09″N 84°12′49″W	Lebanon	
31	Lebanon Commercial District	Lebanon Commercial District	October 10, 1984 (#84000429)	Roughly Broadway, Mechanic, Silver, Mulberry, and Main Sts. 39°26′02″N 84°12′29″W	Lebanon	
32	Mackinaw Historic District	Mackinaw Historic District	July 21, 1980 (#80003242)	Off State Route 123; 39°33′50″N 84°18′26″W	Franklin	
33	Maplewood Sanitorium	Maplewood Sanitorium	October 10, 1984 (#84000432)	Maple and Deerfield Sts. 39°25′31″N 84°12′25″W	Lebanon	
34	Moses McKay House	Moses McKay House	February 17, 1978 (#78002207)	East of Waynesville, on New Burlington Rd. 39°32′37″N 84°00′57″W	Wayne Township	
35	Miami Monthly Meeting Historic District	Miami Monthly Meeting Historic District	September 18, 1998 (#98001180)	Vicinity of 4th and High Sts. 39°31′46″N 84°05′27″W	Waynesville	
36	Moar Mound and Village	Moar Mound and Village	January 1, 1976 (#76001543)	Back a lane on the northern side of Lebanon-Union Rd., west of Morrow; 39°21′49″N 84°11′45″W	Hamilton Township	
37	Mohrman-Jack-Evans House	Mohrman-Jack-Evans House	October 10, 1984 (#84000433)	342 Columbus Ave. 39°26′16″N 84°11′56″W	Lebanon	
38	North Broadway Historic District	North Broadway Historic District	October 10, 1984 (#84000435)	Roughly Broadway, Warren, Pleasant, New, and Mechanic Sts. 39°26′13″N 84°12′26″W	Lebanon	
39	Old Log Post Office	Old Log Post Office	March 17, 1976 (#76001541)	5th and River Sts. 39°33′35″N 84°18′24″W	Franklin	
40	Peters Cartridge Company	Peters Cartridge Company	October 10, 1985 (#85003115)	1915 Grandin Rd., southeast of Kings Mills; 39°21′01″N 84°14′33″W	Hamilton Township	
41	Edmund Robinson House	Edmund Robinson House	April 16, 1979 (#79001974)	North of Lebanon at 3208 State Route 48; 39°29′04″N 84°12′03″W	Clearcreek Township	Photo is not the correct house per the address and photo in the NRHP application. The Robinson house is 2 houses to the south.
42	John Satterthwaite House	John Satterthwaite House	March 30, 1988 (#88000239)	498 N. 3rd St. 39°32′09″N 84°04′56″W	Waynesville	
43	Smith-Davis House	Smith-Davis House	February 6, 1985 (#85000245)	206 W. Silver St. 39°26′09″N 84°12′40″W	Lebanon	
44	Springboro Historic District	Springboro Historic District	August 10, 1999 (#99000914)	Roughly bounded by Main, East, and Mill Sts., and Central Ave. 39°33′18″N 84°13′57″W	Springboro	
45	Stanton Farm	Stanton Farm	May 29, 1980 (#80003243)	Northeast of Downtown Springboro on Tanglewood Drive south of West Lytle-Five Points Road. 39°34′22″N 84°13′34″W	Clearcreek Township	
46	Benjamin A. Stokes House	Benjamin A. Stokes House	July 18, 1983 (#83002064)	5587 State Route 48, north of Lebanon; 39°31′01″N 84°11′10″W	Clearcreek Township	
47	Stubbs Earthworks	Stubbs Earthworks	April 4, 1978 (#78002205)	Campus of Little Miami High School; 39°21′26″N 84°09′37″W	Hamilton Township	
48	Taylor Mound and Village Site	Taylor Mound and Village Site	March 31, 1978 (#78002206)	Just south of the confluence of Caesar's Creek and the Little Miami River; 39°29′22″N 84°06′04″W	Wayne Township	
49	Trevey Mound (33WA193)		June 20, 1986 (#86001345)	Address Restricted	Morrow	
50	Waynesville Engine House and Lockup	Waynesville Engine House and Lockup	January 21, 1999 (#98001643)	260 Chapman St. 39°31′56″N 84°05′08″W	Waynesville	
51	Waynesville Greek Revival Houses	Waynesville Greek Revival Houses	August 8, 1979 (#79001976)	5303 and 5323 Wilkerson Lane; 39°31′30″N 84°05′34″W	Waynesville	
52	Waynesville Main Street Historic District	Waynesville Main Street Historic District	March 20, 2002 (#02000220)	Main St. 39°31′48″N 84°05′11″W	Waynesville	
53	West Baptist Church	West Baptist Church	October 18, 1984 (#84000161)	500 W. Mulberry St. 39°26′06″N 84°12′51″W	Lebanon	
54	Dr. Aaron Wright House	Dr. Aaron Wright House	August 3, 1979 (#79001975)	155 W. Central Ave. 39°33′27″N 84°14′18″W	Springboro	

== Former listings ==
	Name on the Register	Image	Date listed	Date removed	Location	City or town	Description
1	Lukins-Plummer House	Lukins-Plummer House	June 5, 1974 (#74002342)	Unknown	W of Harveysburg off Middletown Rd.	Harveysburg	

== See also ==
- List of National Historic Landmarks in Ohio
- Listings in neighboring counties: Butler, Clermont, Clinton, Greene, Hamilton, Montgomery
- National Register of Historic Places listings in Ohio
