= Corwin House =

Corwin House may refer to:

- Thomas Corwin House, residence of governor of Ohio, in Lebanon, Ohio, U.S.
- Corwin House (Lebanon, Ohio), NRHP listed residence of cousins of governor of Ohio, in Lebanon, Ohio, U.S.
- Taylor–Corwin House, in Pine Bush, New York, U.S.
- Jonathan Corwin House, or The Witch House, in Salem, Massachusetts, U.S.
