= Browns Mill =

Browns Mill may refer to:

- Browns Mill, Ohio
- Browns Mill, West Virginia

== See also ==
- Browns Mills, New Jersey
