= Floraville =

Floraville may refer to:

- Floraville, Illinois
- Floraville, New South Wales
- Floraville Historic District, Lebanon, Ohio
