= Waynesville Main Street Historic District =

Waynesville Main Street Historic District may refer to:

- Waynesville Main Street Historic District (Waynesville, North Carolina), listed on the NRHP in North Carolina
- Waynesville Main Street Historic District (Waynesville, Ohio), listed on the NRHP in Ohio

== See also ==
- Main Street Historic District (disambiguation)
