= Surface (disambiguation) =

A surface is the outermost or uppermost layer of a physical object or space.

Surface or surfaces may also refer to:

== Film and television ==
- Surface (2005 TV series), an American science fiction show
- Surface (2022 TV series), an American psychological thriller miniseries
- The Surface (film), a 2014 American film

== Mathematics ==
- Surface (mathematics), a generalization of a plane which needs not be flat
- Surface (differential geometry), a differentiable two-dimensional manifold
- Surface (topology), a two-dimensional manifold
- Algebraic surface, an algebraic variety of dimension two
- Coordinate surfaces
- Fractal surface, generated using a stochastic algorithm
- Polyhedral surface

== Music ==
- Surface (band), an American R&B and pop trio
  - Surface (Surface album), 1986
- Surfaces (band), American musical duo
- Surface (Circle album), 1998
- The Surface (album), 2023, the fifth album by Beartooth
- "Surface" (Aero Chord song), 2014
- "Surface", a song from the 2010 album Atonement by Your Memorial

== People ==
- Harvey A. Surface (1867–1941), American zoologist and Pennsylvania legislator
- Mary Hall Surface (born 1958), American playwright and theater director

== Publications ==
- Surface (magazine), an American architecture magazine since 1993
- Surfaces (Université de Montréal journal), published from 1991 to 1999
- Surfaces (MDPI journal), published from 2018 onwards
- Surface Science (journal)

== Technology ==
- Microsoft Surface, the brand for a line of computers and related accessories by Microsoft
- Microsoft PixelSense (formerly known as Surface), a commercial computing platform

== See also ==
- Surfacing (disambiguation)
