= Waynesville Greek Revival Houses =

- U.S. National Register of Historic Places
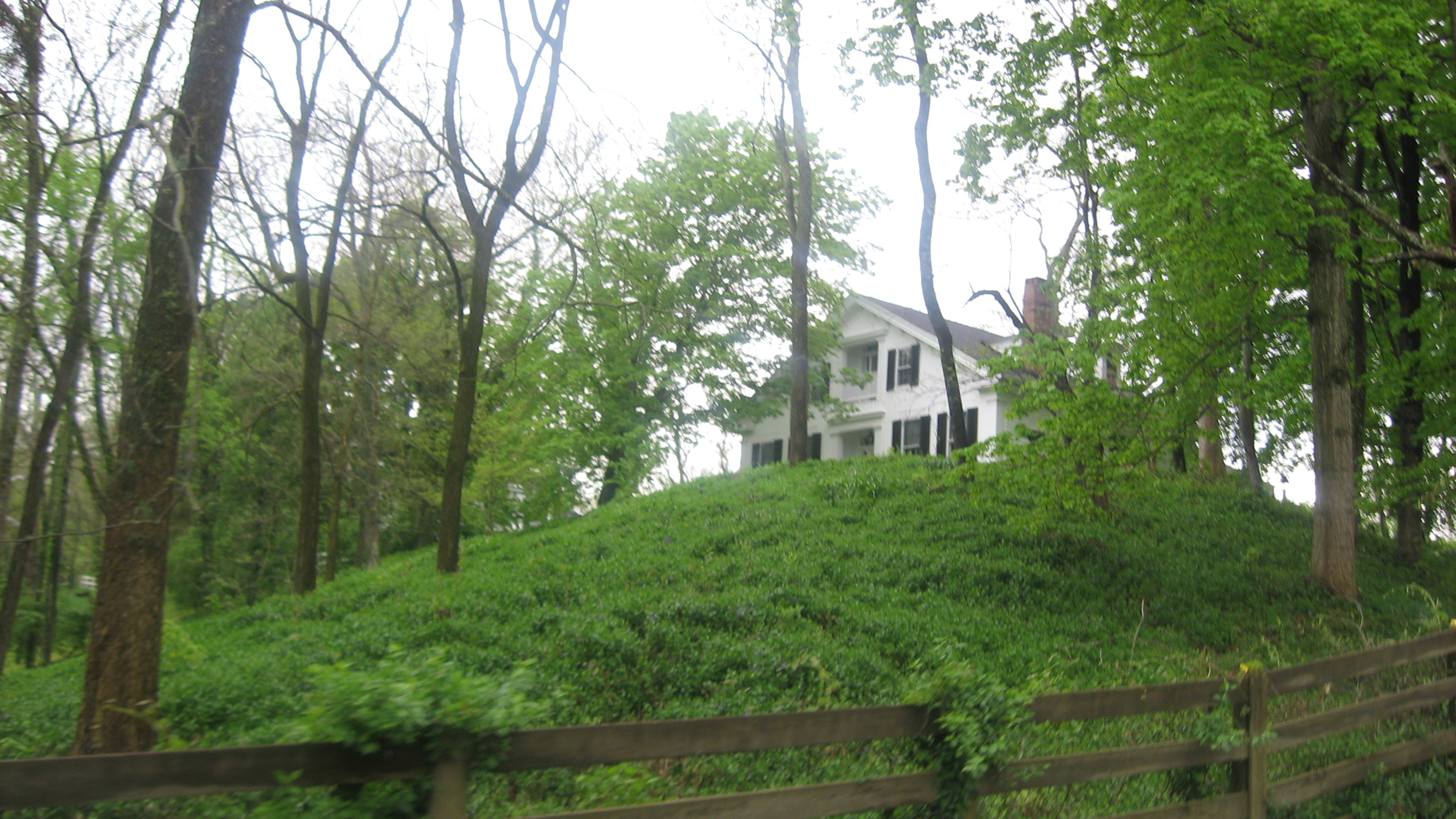

- Location within Ohio
- Location: 5303 and 5323 Wilkerson Lane, Waynesville, Ohio
- Coordinates: 39°31′30″N 84°05′34″W
- Area: 7.2 acres (2.9 ha)
- Built: 1848
- Architectural style: Greek Revival
- NRHP reference No.: 79001976
- Added to NRHP: August 8, 1979

The Waynesville Greek Revival Houses, at 5303 and 5323 Wilkerson Lane in Waynesville, Ohio, were listed on the National Register of Historic Places in 1979.

The listing consists of two Greek Revival houses: the Jacob McKay House (also known as "Doric Hill") and the McClelland-Cook House. The McKay house was built in 1848.
