= Armco Park Mound II =

Archaeological site in Ohio, United States

- U.S. National Register of Historic Places
- Nearest city: Otterbein, Ohio
- NRHP reference No.: 75001551
- Added to NRHP: 1975-05-29

Armco Park Mound II is a registered historic site near Otterbein, Ohio, United States, listed in the National Register on 29 May 1975.

== Historic uses ==
- Graves/burials

== See also ==
- List of Registered Historic Places in Warren County, Ohio* List of burial mounds in the United States
