= Armco Park Mound I =

Archaeological site in Ohio, United States

- U.S. National Register of Historic Places
- Nearest city: Otterbein, Ohio
- NRHP reference No.: 75001550
- Added to NRHP: 29 May 1975

Armco Park Mound I is an archaeological site near Otterbein, Ohio. It was listed in the National Register of Historic Places on May 29, 1975. Publication of the location of this site by the United States government is restricted under the Archaeological Resources Protection Act of 1979.

== See also ==
- List of Registered Historic Places in Warren County, Ohio
- List of burial mounds in the United States
- Protected area
