= Bone Mound II =

Archaeological site in Ohio, United States

- U.S. National Register of Historic Places
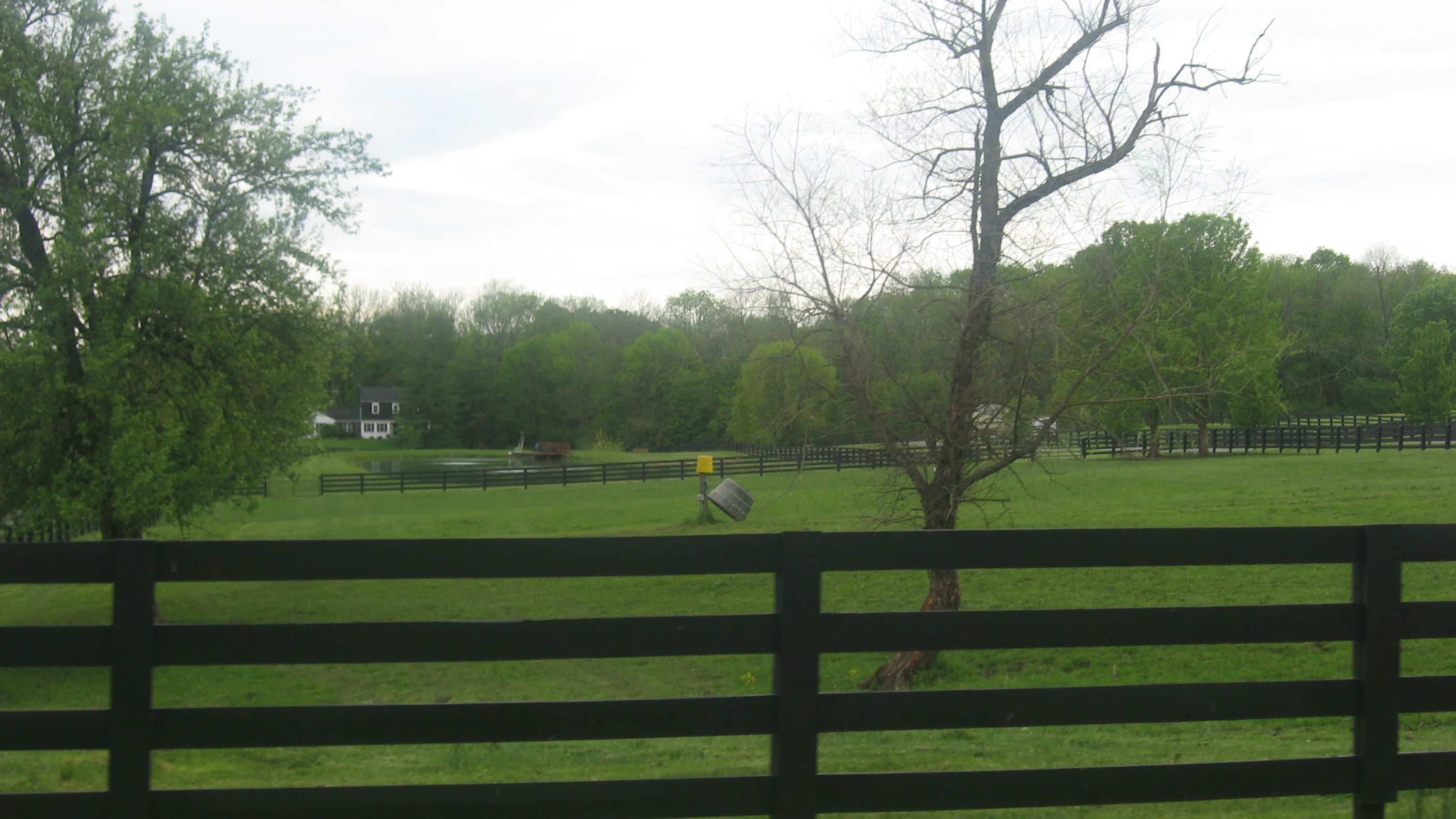
- Looking toward the site

- Location within Ohio Location within the United States
- Location: Northwestern quarter of the southwestern quarter of Section 9 of Wayne Township, northwest of Oregonia
- Nearest city: Oregonia, Ohio
- Coordinates: 39°28′54″N 84°7′20″W
- Area: 1 acre (0.40 ha)
- NRHP reference No.: 74001643
- Added to NRHP: July 15, 1974

The Bone Mound II is a Native American mound in the southwestern part of the U.S. state of Ohio. Located northwest of the unincorporated community of Oregonia, the mound sits in an area of light woodland.

At a height of 4 feet (1.2 m) and a diameter of 50 feet (15 m), it is believed to have been built by people of the Fort Ancient culture. Although it has never been excavated, multiple confirmed Fort Ancient sites, including mounds and two cemeteries, are located within 1 mile (1.6 km) of the Bone Mound II. The closest of these sites, a rare cemetery composed of limestone burial vaults, is only about 500 feet (150 m) away.

The Fort Ancient people are known to have used burial vaults, pits, and two types of mounds for the burial of their dead. However, most areas with such a high concentration of Fort Ancient sites employ only a single method of burial. Because the area around the Bone Mound II shows evidence of multiple methods of burial, it may have been occupied by multiple foci of the Fort Ancient people; consequently, the region is very valuable archaeologically.

On July 15, 1974, the Bone Mound II was listed on the National Register of Historic Places because of its potential to be an archaeological site. The Bone Stone Graves, the cemetery with limestone vaults, was listed on the Register on the same day.
