= Surfacing =

Surfacing may refer to:

- Surfacing (album), an album by Sarah McLachlan
- Surfacing (novel), a novel by Margaret Atwood
- Surfacing (film), a 1981 film directed by Claude Jutra based on Atwood's novel
- Wet Bum (released as Surfacing in some international markets), a 2014 film directed by Lindsay Mackay
- "Surfacing", a song by the band Slipknot from Slipknot
- "Surfacing", a song by Chapel Club from Palace
- "Surfacing", a song by Pink Floyd from The Endless River
- "Surfacing", a song by Trust Company from True Parallels

== See also ==
- Surface (disambiguation)
