= Mackinaw Historic District =

Historic district in Ohio, United States

- U.S. National Register of Historic Places
- U.S. Historic district
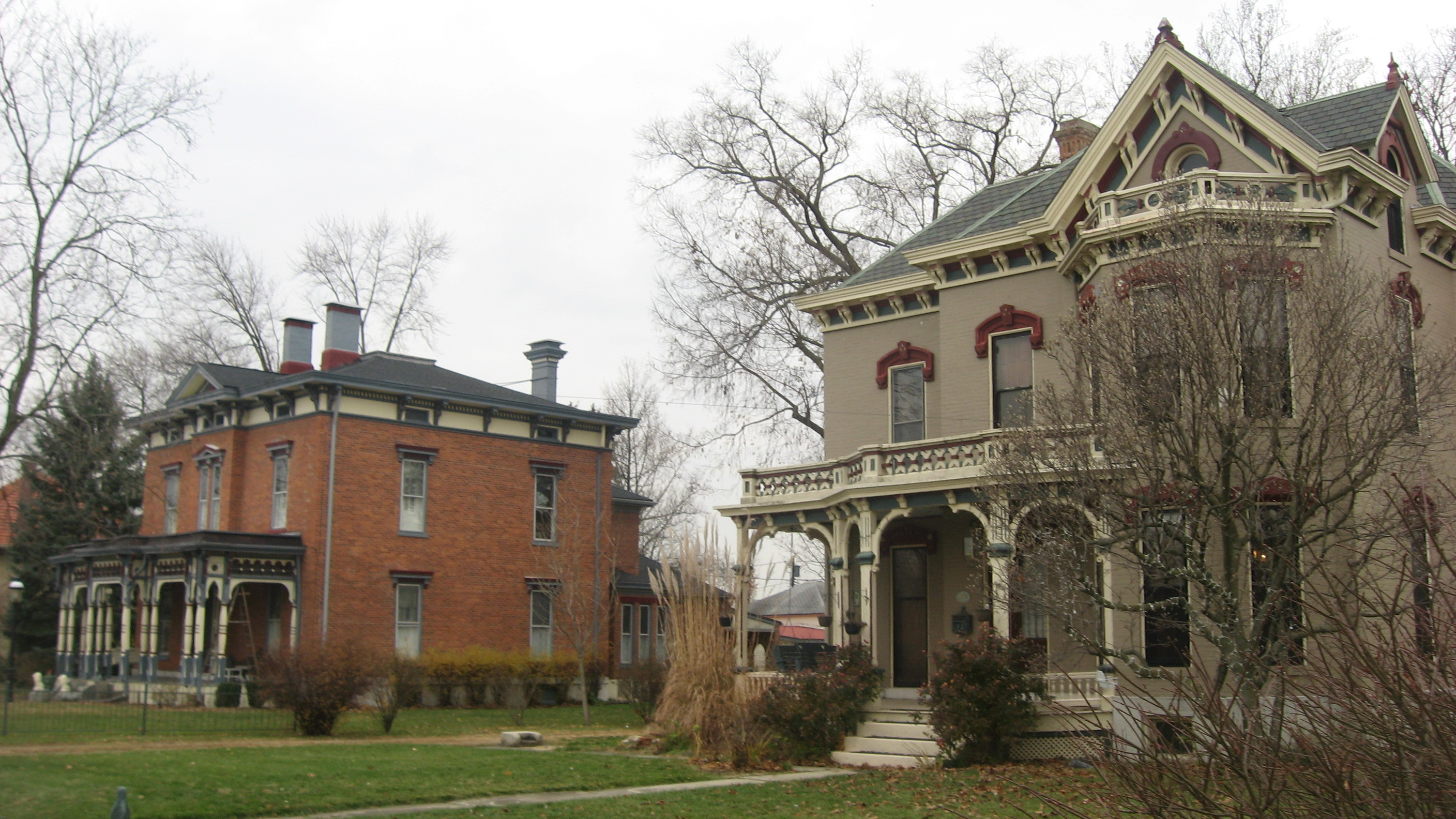
- Houses on the western side of the 300 block of S. Miami Avenue, in the heart of the historic district

- Location within Ohio Location within the United States
- Location: Off OH 123, Franklin, Ohio
- Coordinates: 39.563889°N 84.307222°W
- Area: 19.1 acres (7.7 ha)
- Architectural style: Mid 19th Century Revival, Late Victorian, Queen Anne
- NRHP reference No.: 80003242
- Added to NRHP: July 21, 1980

The Mackinaw Historic District is a historic residential area located on the western side of the Great Miami River in Franklin, Ohio. The historic district was added to the National Register of Historic Places in 1980. The area features homes built between 1825 and 1925 spanning numerous architectural styles, including Queen Anne and other Victorian styles. The most notable building is the Harding House (now Harding Museum), a Colonial Revival mansion in the heart of the district.

== See also ==
- List of Registered Historic Places in Warren County, Ohio
