= Bone Stone Graves =

Archaeological site in Ohio, United States

- U.S. National Register of Historic Places
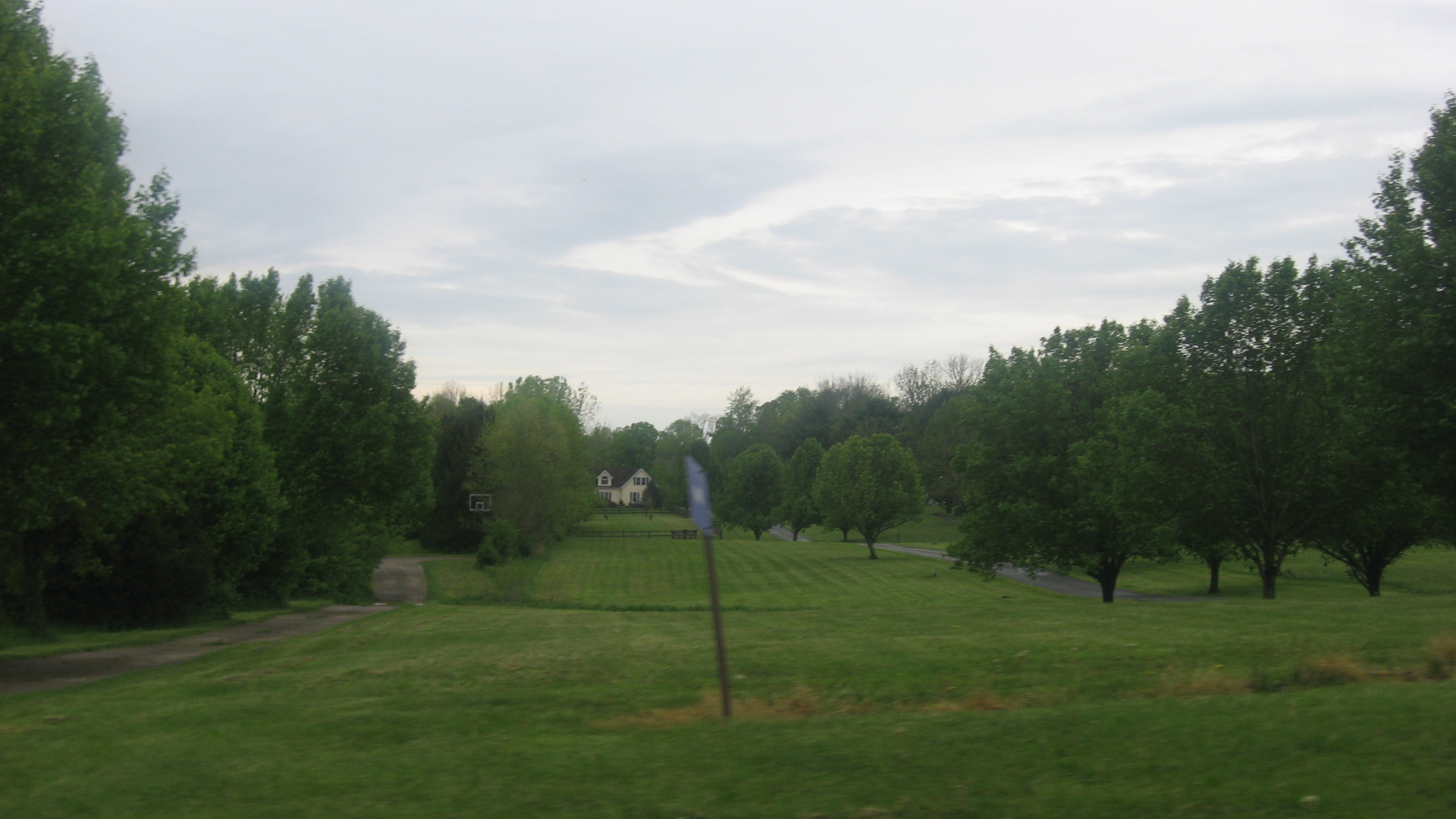
- Looking toward the site from the north

- Location within Ohio Location within the United States
- Location: Northwestern quarter of the southwestern quarter of Section 9 of Wayne Township, northwest of Oregonia
- Nearest city: Oregonia, Ohio
- Coordinates: 39°28′53″N 84°7′19″W
- Area: 2 acres (0.81 ha)
- NRHP reference No.: 74001644
- Added to NRHP: July 15, 1974

The Bone Stone Graves are a prehistoric cemetery in the southwestern part of the U.S. state of Ohio. Located northwest of the unincorporated community of Oregonia in northwestern Washington Township, Warren County, the cemetery is composed of an uncertain number of graves of individuals from the Fort Ancient culture of Native Americans.

Graves at the site are composed of bodies contained within limestone stone box graves. A cemetery of this type from the Fort Ancient period is very uncommon, making the Stone Graves a valuable archaeological site. Increasing the significance of the area is a complex of other nearby Fort Ancient sites, including the Bone Mound II that is only 500 feet (150 m) away. Because most Fort Ancient sites include only a single type of burials, rather than both a mound and a cemetery, it is believed that the vicinity of the Stone Graves may have been inhabited by people of two different foci. In the future, more information may be gained from the cemetery, for the site has never been subject to an archaeological excavation.

On July 15, 1974, the Bone Stone Graves were listed on the National Register of Historic Places because of their archaeological value. The Bone Mound II was listed on the Register on the same day.
