= Harvey A. Surface =

American politician and zoologist (1867–1941)

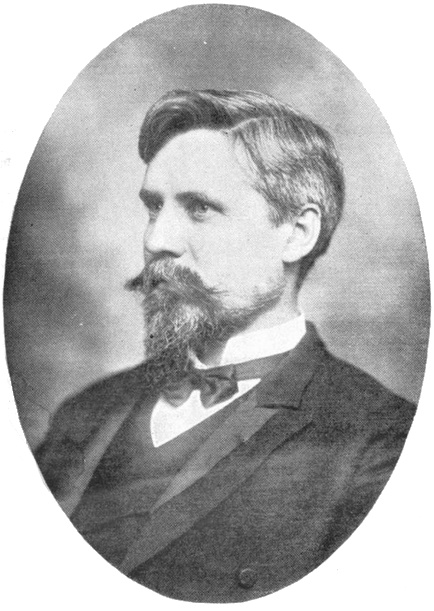
- Born: July 25, 1867
- Died: July 18, 1941 (aged 73)
- Scientific career
- Fields: Zoology

Member of the Pennsylvania House of Representatives from the Snyder County district
- In office 1931–1936

Harvey Adam Surface (July 25, 1867 – July 18, 1941) was an American zoologist. He was the economic zoologist for the Pennsylvania Department of Agriculture for fifteen years, and later served three terms in the Pennsylvania Legislature.

== Formative years ==
Born in Waynesville, Ohio, on July 25, 1867, to a prominent farming family, Harvey A. Surface graduated from The Ohio State University in 1891, and earned a M.S. the following year.

After teaching at the University of the Pacific and Cornell, he became professor of zoology at Pennsylvania State College from 1900 to 1907, and professor of biology at Susquehanna University from 1920 to 1930. His work focused on the wildlife and plants of Pennsylvania.

He was ornithological editor of American Gardening, the nature study editor of Popular Educator, and a member of the American Association for the Advancement of Science, the Pennsylvania Academy of Science, and the Pennsylvania Audubon Society. He was also the president of the Pennsylvania Beekeeper’s Association for eighteen years.

In 1931, he was elected to the Pennsylvania House of Representatives as a representative from Snyder County. He served in this capacity until 1936.
