= Browns Mill, West Virginia =

Unincorporated community in West Virginia, United States

- Unincorporated community
- Location within West Virginia Location within the United States
- Coordinates: 39°28′46″N 79°49′41″W
- Country: United States
- State: West Virginia
- County: Preston
- Elevation: 1,657 ft (505 m)
- Time zone: UTC-5 (Eastern (EST))
  - Summer (DST): UTC-4 (EDT)
- Area codes: 304 & 681
- GNIS feature ID: 1536438

Browns Mill is an unincorporated community in Preston County, in the U.S. state of West Virginia.

== History ==
An old variant name was Zinns Mill, after the local Zinn family. A post office called Zinns Mills was in operation from 1862 until 1864.
