= Floraville Historic District =

Historic district in Ohio, United States

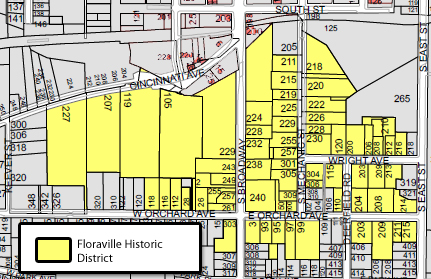

Floraville is one of four historic districts in Lebanon, Ohio listed in the National Register of Historic Places. It is roughly bounded by Keever St. to the west, Cincinnati Ave. to the north, East St. to the east, and Orchard Ave. to the south. Comprising 440 acres, the district includes 61 buildings and 1 structure. It was listed on the National Register of Historic Places on October 10, 1984

== History ==
The first recorded inhabitants of the area now known as Floraville were a company of Native American Indians that would regularly camp on the hillside just south of Cincinnati Pike (now Cincinnati Avenue). First observed in the winter of 1798, 4 years before Lebanon is platted, they are seen for a short time each spring making sugar in what is now the western end of Floraville.

According to a letter written by John C Skinner, dated October 31, 1889, and published in The Western Star, up until at least 1824 there was only one dwelling, the Maple-Rackett House (229 S Mechanic St.), within the boundaries now considered Floraville. That quickly changed as Lebanon established itself as the most important city in Warren County and a golden age of architecture came to the town. By 1839 there were 10 carpenter and joiner shops with 38 hands, a testament to the building activity in the area. The now wealthy professionals and businessmen looked outside city limits to establish their grand estates. Many set their eyes to the rolling hillside of the old Indian sugar camp, just south of the urban center.

By the mid-nineteenth century Floraville consisted of several large estates along Cincinnati Avenue and South Mechanic Street. The district became known for its sprawling gardens, curved paths, and abundant landscaping, which gave rise to the name Floraville. At the 1851 Ohio General Assembly it was proposed to incorporate the suburb into its own town under the new name. The proposal was described as follows:

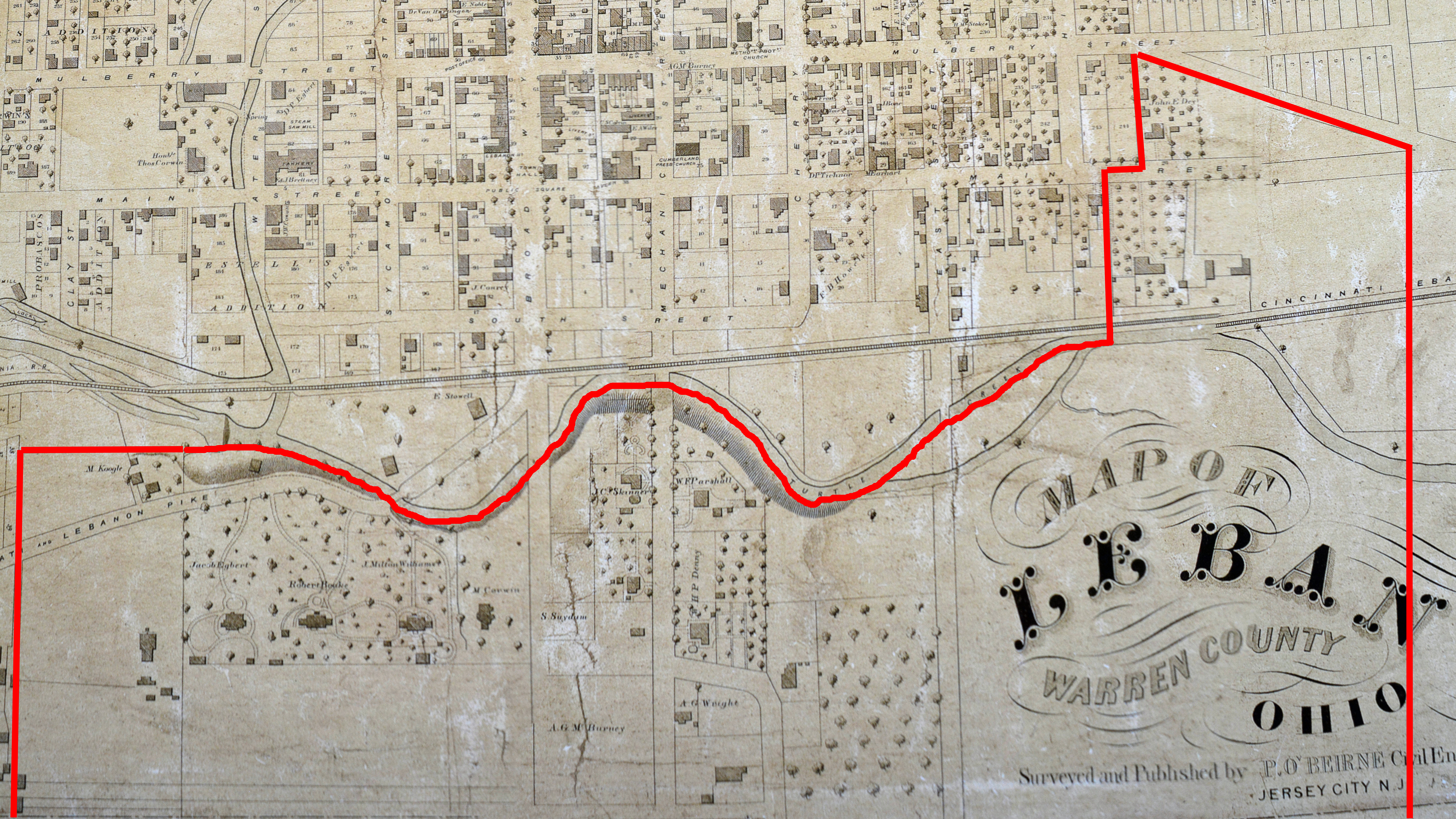
Approximate boundaries of Floraville in 1854

"And be it further enacted by the General Assembly of the State of Ohio, That the town of Floraville, in Warren county, be, and the same is hereby created a town corporate by the name of the town of Floraville, with the following boundaries, to wit: Beginning at the north-west corner of a lot of ground, now owned by Matthew Koogle, running thence in a southerly direction to the south-west corner of a lot of six acres and owned by George Miller, thence east to a point in the lands of A. H. Denelavy, and south from the west corner of a lot owned by John E. Dey, thence north to said corner of said Dey’s lot, thence west along the Lebanon and Chillicothe road to a lane running through John E. Dey’s land, thence down said lane to a road leading to Wilmington, thence west along the centre of said road to the line between the lands of Simon Suydam and Amos Smith, thence south on said Suydam and Smith’s line to the south bank of Turtle Creek, thence down the south bank of said creek to the place of beginning.

The said town of Floraville shall be entitled to all the privileges, and be subject to all the restrictions, conferred and imposed by the provisions of an act entitled An act for the regulation of incorporated towns"

In March 1862 Floraville was annexed into the growing city of Lebanon, but its splendor was not lost. In an 1873 letter to the editor of the Jackson Standard the district was described as follows:

"Floraville, the south-western part of [Lebanon], is the prettiest part of it. It is noted for its nice and most beautiful buildings, and in the yards there are many beautiful trees, of different kinds, which adds a great deal to its appearance"

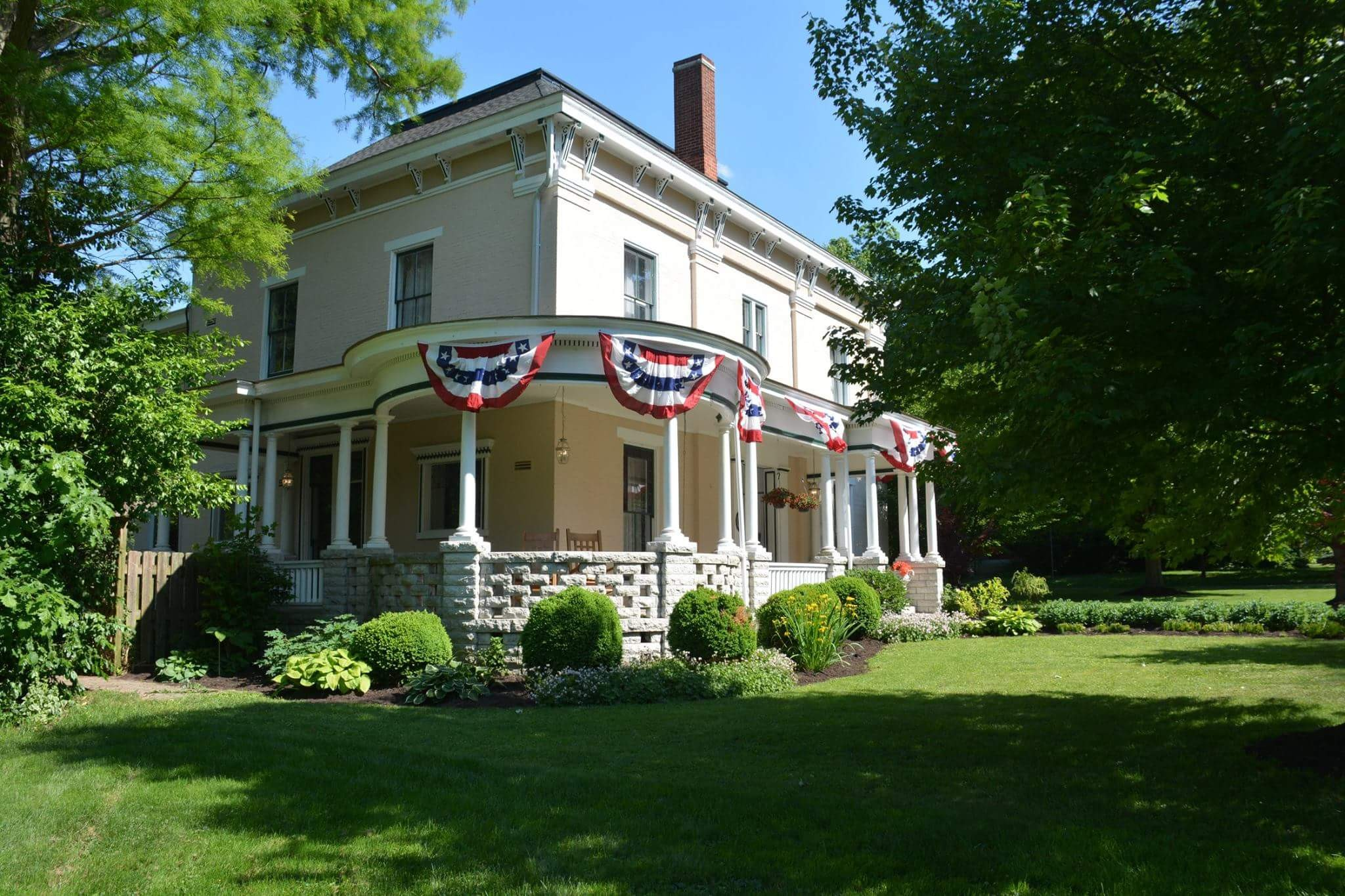
The Parshall-Runyan House, formally Carr Nursing Home

Nearing the turn of the century, some of the large land tracts were partitioned into smaller lots for more modest homes. A few decades later, the demand for stately mansions plummeted with the onset of the Great Depression. Most of the houses stayed intact but were repurposed to fit the changing demographic: Glendower Historic Mansion (105 Cincinnati Ave) became a museum for many years and was only recently restored to a private residence in 2023; the Parshall-Runyan House (220 Mechanic St) began functioning as a nursing home and remained as such for almost 70 years; a number of other homes were converted to multi-unit apartments. After the turn of the most recent century, a renewed interest in restoring these iconic structures has taken hold. Most have been reverted to single-family dwellings and restored to their former glory. The proximity to downtown Lebanon and picturesque setting make the ideal location for a bed and breakfast or vacation rental, both of which can currently be found scattered throughout the district. In October 1984 the area was listed on the US Register of Historic Places, further preserving Floraville's history for many more generations to come.

== Prominent Residents ==
- Judge Willard Wright, father of internationally known industrial designer Russel Wright
- Robert Boake
- J. Milton Williams, member of the second constitution of Ohio convention, General Assembly of Ohio Representative
- Judge G. W. Stanley
- Judge James Allen Runyan, Common Pleas Court Judge, President of Citizens National Bank, Democratic National Convention Delegate, appointed receiver of Shaker Village
- Durbin Ward, attorney, statesman and Civil War general
- Richard S. Thomas, early town lawyer and state senator from 1806 to 1808
- William H P Denny, newspaper editor, publisher, and politician
- Andrew Graham McBurney, politician and lieutenant governor of Ohio
- John C Skinner, Fourth Warren County Auditor and dry good merchant
- Professor Alfred Holbrook, First President of the National Normal University

== Architecture ==
Characterized by gracious homes on spacious lots, the Floraville Historic District retains many of the architecturally significant estates that established its place in history. Some of the first homes in the area, built in the 1830s and 1840s, were substantial cube-like brick structures patterned after the Greek Revival movement. They can be easily identified by piers across the front facade, simple classical decorations and roof lines adorned with heavy dentil molding. The earliest example can be found at 215 South Mechanic Street and a similar design can be seen in the Parshall-Runyan House (220 S Mechanic St.) across the street. Glendower Historic Mansion (105 Cincinnati Ave.) is another fine example of the Greek Revival design as well as is its neighbor, The Pillars (119 Cincinnati Ave.), no doubt because the original owners were brothers-in-law bent on one upping each other.

Almost concurrent with the Greek Revival movement, elements of the Gothic Revival also began to emerge in homes around Floraville. The most notable example is The Cropper House AKA The Gables (229 Cincinnati Ave). Typified by its pointed arches and gingerbread-ike trim, the mullioned windows contain 108 separate panes of glass.

In the housing boom that followed the Civil War, aesthetics began to shift toward Italianate styles. Many variations on the design can be spotted throughout Floraville, including an iconic Italian Villa known as The Gothic (207 Cincinnati Ave.) that also borrows many Gothic elements responsible for its name. Some of the earlier Italianate homes, like Burl Manor (230 S Mechanic St.), are similar in shape and size to the Greek Revival estates, while those built closer to the turn of the century are more modest frame residences with pedimented lintels, dog-ear window surrounds, bracketed friezes, and porches with cut-out designs in the posts.

== Notable homes ==
Home	Address	Year built	Architectural style	Historical significance
	229 S Mechanic St.	1808	Federal	
	230 S Mechanic St.	1830	Italianate	Built by Amos Bennett for prominent businessman and politician William H P Denney. Denny began his career as an apprentice at the Western Star newspaper where he worked his way to partner and eventual owner by 1858. He served as a senator in the 41st and 42nd General Assemblies in 1842 and 1843. In an oration given by Prof. William H Venable for The Lebanon Centennial he notes, "Denny was one of the first who had a home on the Floraville side of the creek, in the aristocratic quarter... His house was that of a St. Julian, his board instead of groaning, laughed under its festal load." The home was eventually converted into a bed and breakfast in 1981.
	304 S Mechanic St.	1830		
	215 S Mechanic St.	Late 1840	Greek Revival	Built for John C Skinner, who served as Warren County's auditor from 1844 through 1852. It was one of the first Greek Revival homes built in Floraville. Piers across the front facade and simple classical decorations set the trend for subsequent Floraville estates: Glendower Mansion, Runyan Homestead and The Pillars.
	99 E Orchard St.	1838	Italianate	
	105 Cincinnati Ave.	1845	Greek Revival	Glendower Historic Mansion was built for about $10,000 by Amos Bennett for local merchant, attorney, and politician John Milton Williams. In the March 1938 issue of American Home, Glendower was described as an excellent example of “one of the important domestic types of early American Architecture.” In 1946, Ralph Fanning of the fine arts department at The Ohio State University called the home “one of the finest bits of Greek Revival architecture anywhere in the country.” It has had several prominent residents, including Civil War General Durbin Ward. The fateful ends of the first three owners lead some to speculate the house is cursed: Williams died a penniless alcoholic; the second went bankrupt helping Civil War veterans reclaim their pension and the third became an elderly recluse. It was operated by the Warren County Historical Society as a public museum until 2023.
	227 Cincinnati Ave.	1845	Greek Revival	
	207 Cincinnati Ave.	1847	Gothic-Italian Villa	Constructed by builder and contractor Ezra Craver for wealthy merchant Jacob Egbert.
	220 S Mechanic St.	1848	Italianate / Greek Revival	Commissioned by one of Lebanon's first grocers, John E Dey, for his daughter and son-in-law William F Parshall, himself a successful dry goods merchant and founder of one of Lebanon's first private banks. In 1885 the house was purchased by Judge James Allen Runyan who added a grand wraparound porch among other additions. The Runyans were notorious for their hospitality and hosted numerous parties and events which often included visits from various statesmen and dignitaries. After Runyan's death in 1930, the estate was converted to a nursing home until it was restored as a private residence in 2000.
	119 Cincinnati Ave.	1848	Greek Revival	
	229 S Broadway	1849	Italian Villa	
	204 & 208 E Orchard Ave.	1895 & 1890	Second Empire	
	226 S. Mechanic St.	1871	Carpenter Gothic	
