= Glendower State Memorial =

Historic house in Ohio, United States

- Glendower
- U.S. National Register of Historic Places
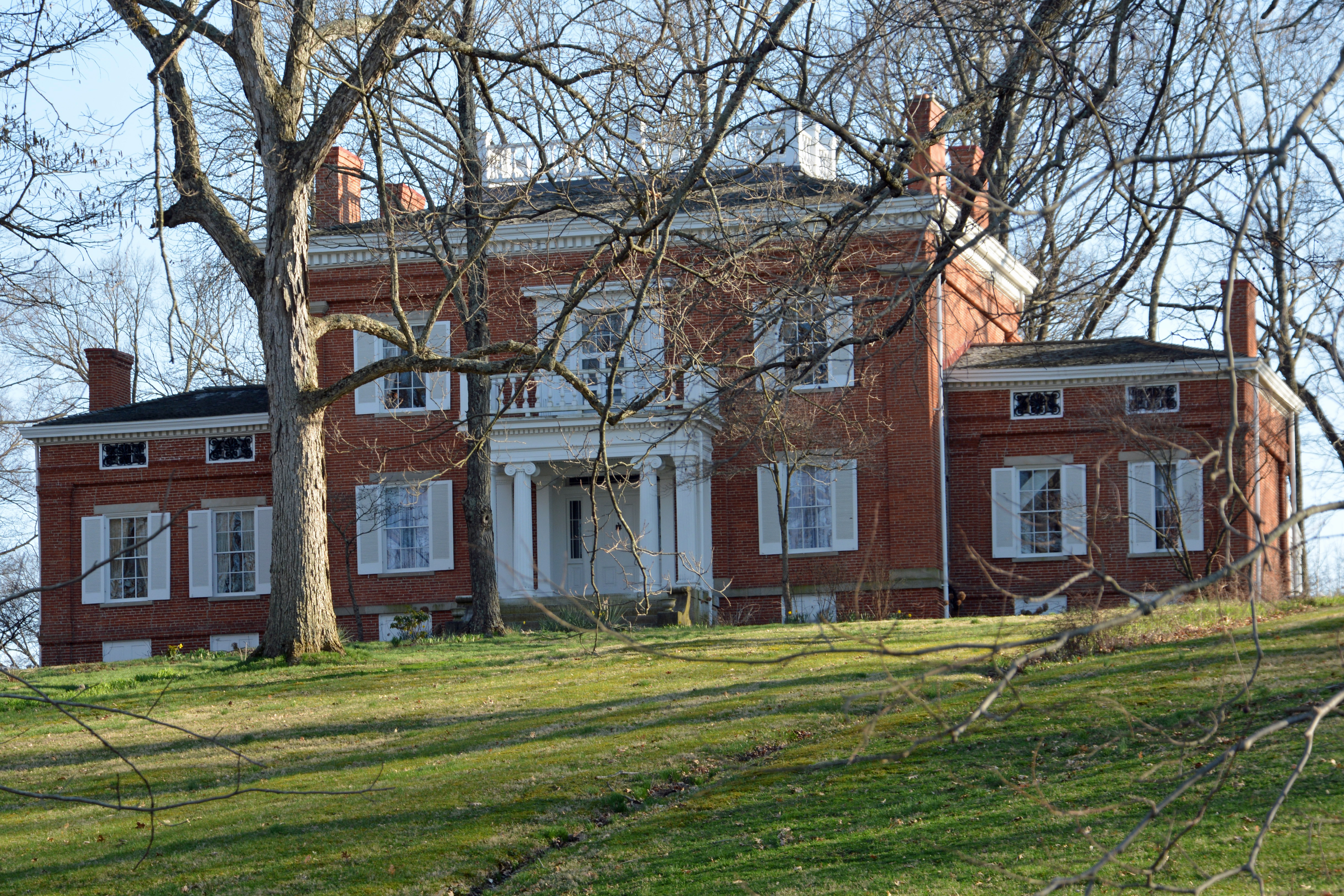
- Front of the mansion

- Location within Ohio Location within the United States
- Location: Lebanon, Ohio
- Coordinates: 39°25′47.5″N 84°12′36″W
- Built: 1836
- Architect: Bennett, Amos
- Architectural style: Greek Revival
- NRHP reference No.: 70000521
- Added to NRHP: November 10, 1970

Glendower, now known as Glendower Historic Mansion and Arboretum, is a historic Greek Revival style house located at 105 Cincinnati Avenue, U.S. Route 42, Cincinnati Avenue, in Lebanon, Ohio. It was built in 1836 by Amos Bennett for John Milton Williams, a Lebanon merchant, and named for Owain Glyndŵr (often anglicised as "Owen Glendower"). It has been called "one of the finest examples of Residential Greek Revival architecture style in the Midwest."

On November 10, 1970, it was added to the National Register of Historic Places.

== Current use ==
From 1944 through 2007, Glendower was operated and maintained by the Ohio Historical Society. On December 3, 2007, it was transferred to the Warren County Historical Society, which ran the site until August 2022 as a museum.

Glendower sold in the fall of 2022 to a private buyer but the sale fell through when the buyer backed out and went on sale again in January 2023, with all restrictive Governor Deed covenants that limited its use removed.

The grounds of Glendower were often used by Civil War reenactors.

== See also ==
- List of Registered Historic Places in Warren County, Ohio
