= Waynesville Main Street Historic District (Waynesville, Ohio) =

Historic district in Ohio, United States

- U.S. National Register of Historic Places
- U.S. Historic district
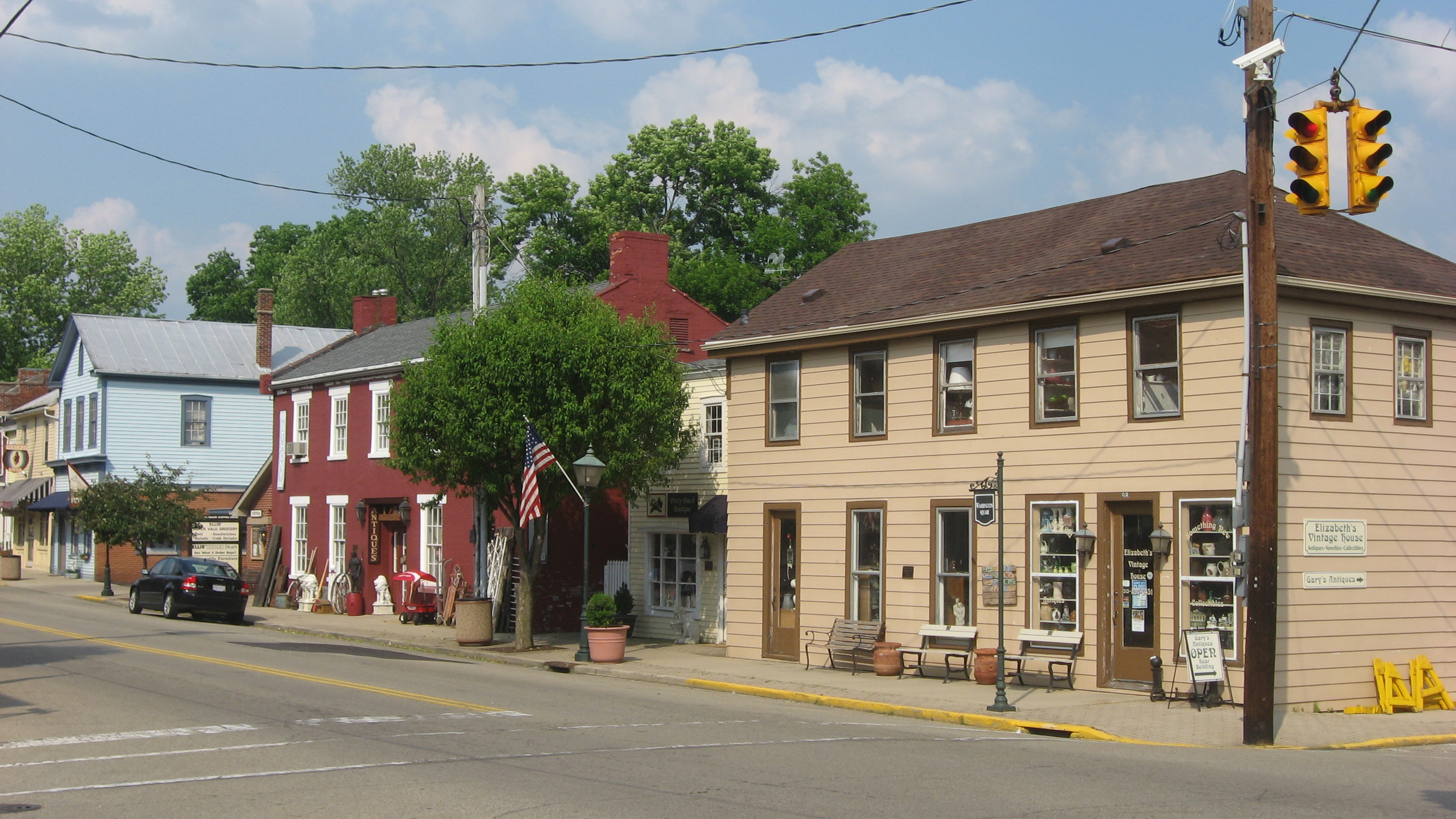
- Businesses in the district

- Location within Ohio Location within the United States
- Location: Main St., Waynesville, Ohio
- Coordinates: 39°31′48″N 84°5′11″W
- Area: 36 acres (15 ha)
- Architectural style: Italianate, Queen Anne, Federal, Late Victorian, Craftsman, Greek Revival, Second Empire
- NRHP reference No.: 02000220
- Added to NRHP: March 20, 2002

The Waynesville Main Street Historic District in Waynesville, Ohio is a 36-acre (15 ha) historic district that was listed on the National Register of Historic Places in 2002. It runs for about five blocks along Main Street from just below South Street in the south to Franklin Road in the north.

In 2002, it included 98 buildings deemed to contribute to the historic character of the area and 35 non-contributing resources.

Selected buildings are:

- Mahlon Bateman House, 38 S. Main St. (1847), is the most important Greek Revival building
- Thomas Swift House, 243 High Street (c.1820), a five-bay brick I-house with Federal style
- Waynesville Academy, 185 N. Main St. (1844)
