= Taylor–Corwin House =

Historic house in New York, United States

- Taylor-Corwin House
- U.S. National Register of Historic Places
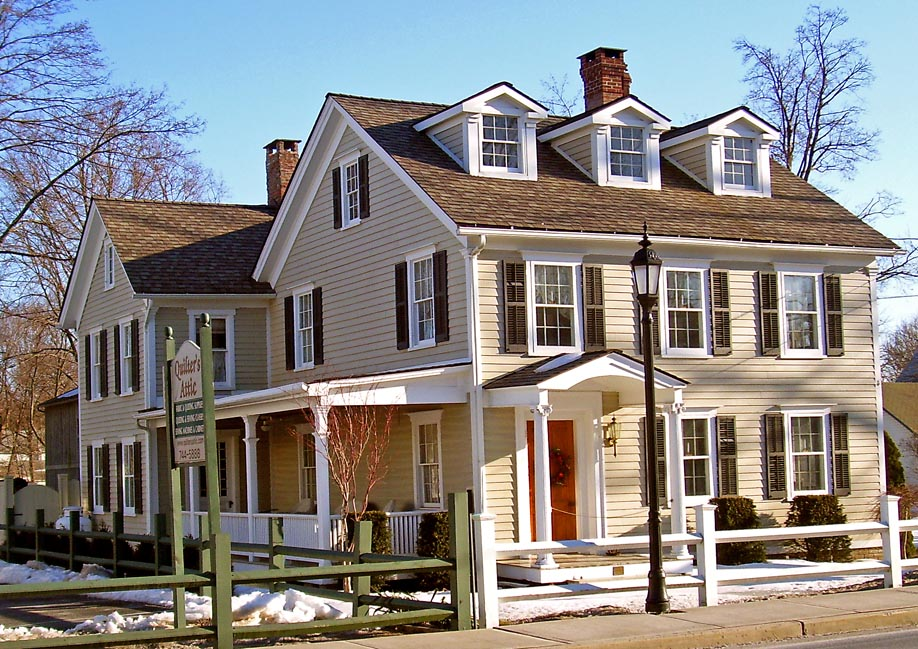
- The Taylor–Corwin House in 2007

- Location within New York Location within the United States
- Location: 112 Maple Ave., Pine Bush, NY
- Nearest city: Middletown
- Coordinates: 41°36′33″N 74°18′11″W
- Area: 0.4 acres (0.16 ha)
- Built: c. 1840
- Architectural style: Colonial Revival, Greek Revival
- NRHP reference No.: 04001442
- Added to NRHP: January 5, 2005

The Taylor–Corwin House, also the Falconer Inn, is a Registered Historic Place in Pine Bush, New York. It is located at 112 Maple Street (NY 302), a few houses south of its intersection with NY 52.

It was one of the earliest houses built in what is today Pine Bush, around 1840. Architecturally, it was built in the then-popular Greek Revival style, with some touches of Colonial Revival. In 1871, James Taylor, the local merchant who originally built the house, sold it to farmer John Corwin. Eleven years later, he in turn sold it to Amanda Falconer, who turned it into an inn. It became popular with travelers on the Crawford Railroad, which terminated at Pine Bush, as a place from which they could take in the scenery of the nearby Shawangunk Ridge.

Since the demise of the railroad, it has since returned to its original status as a private home. It was added to the National Register in 2005.
