= Dr. Aaron Wright House =

Historic house in Ohio, United States

- Dr. Aron Wright House
- U.S. National Register of Historic Places
- Location within Ohio Location within the United States
- Location: 155 W. Central Ave., Springboro, Ohio
- Coordinates: 39°33′27″N 84°14′18″W
- Area: 2 acres (0.81 ha)
- Built: 1857
- NRHP reference No.: 79001975
- Added to NRHP: August 3, 1979

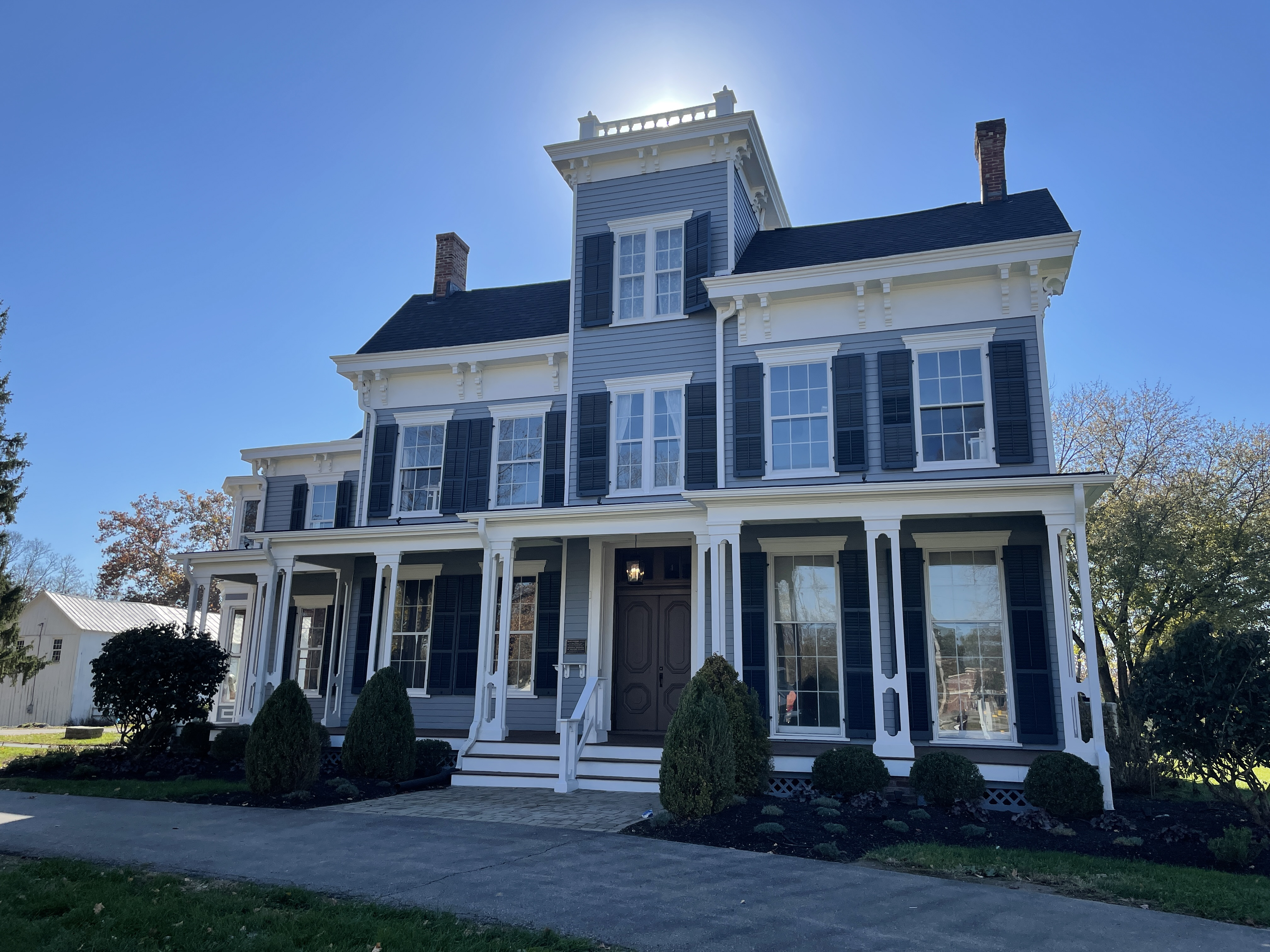

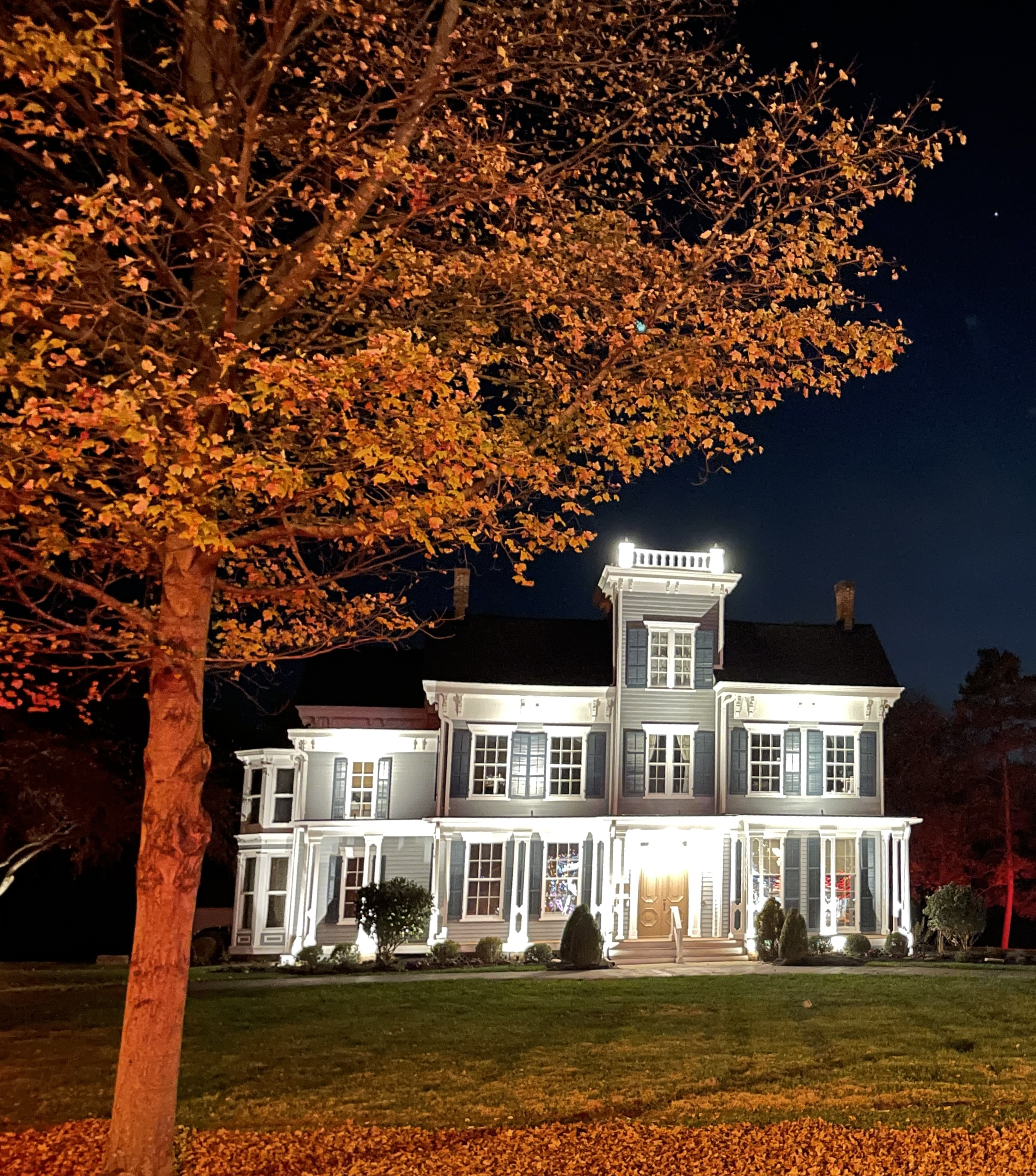

While the National Historic Register officially entitles the home as the Aaron Wright House, Dr. Wright preferred the spelling as Aron. The current owners of the property, Larry and Cheryl Dillin, utilize his preferred spelling. In 2020/2021 the property underwent significant restoration, including structural work and exterior paint and lighting. Recently, the property and the Dillins were awarded with a National historic preservation award from the local Daughters of the Revolution Chapter

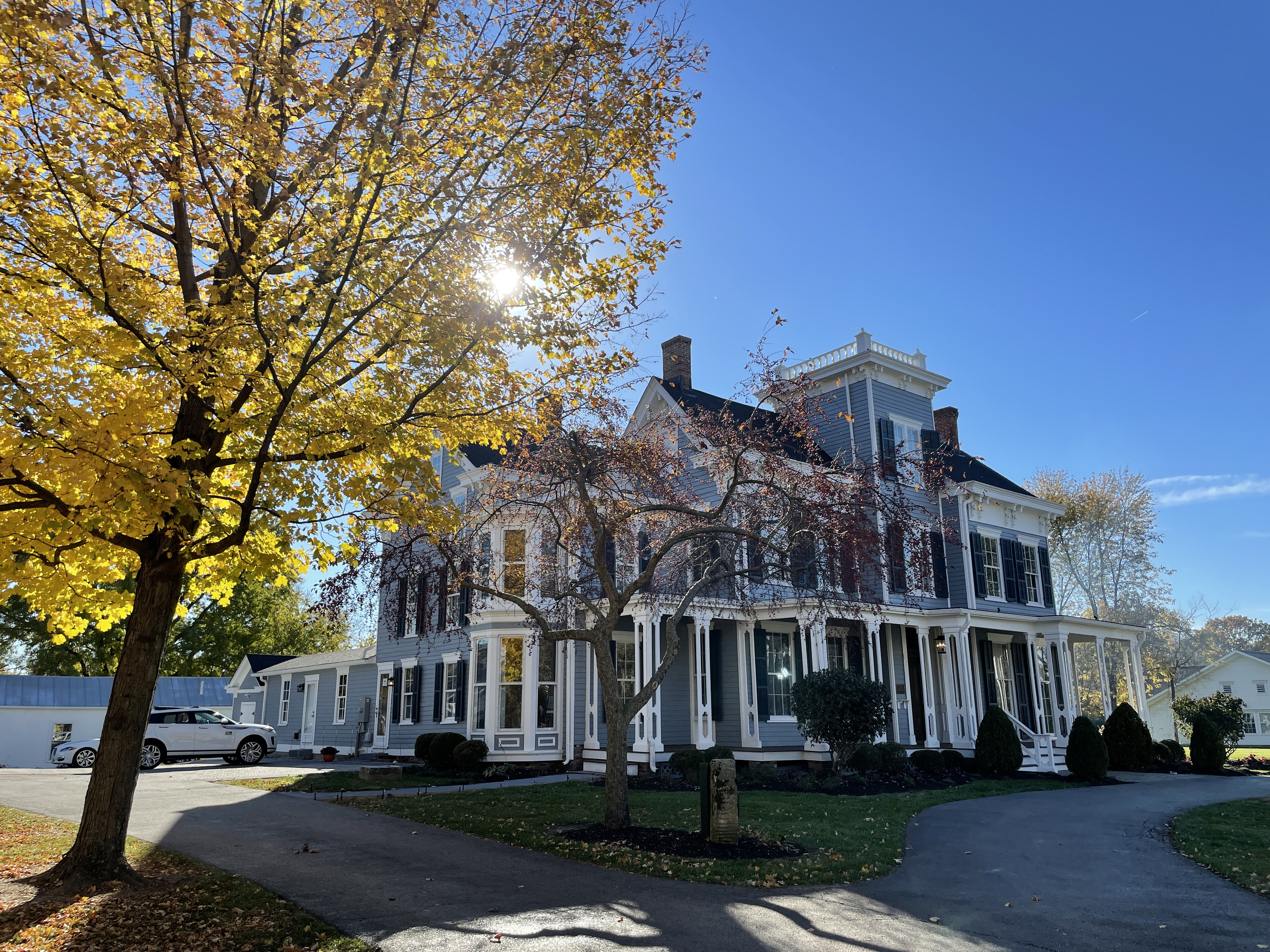

The Dr. Aaron Wright House is a historic home located in Springboro, Ohio. It was built by Dr. Aaron Wright in 1857. Since 1979 the house has been listed on the National Register of Historic Places.
