= Thomas Corwin House =

Coordinates: 39°26′02″N 84°12′43″W

The Corwin House is a historic home located in Lebanon, Ohio, that was once inhabited by former Ohio Governor and United States Treasury Secretary Thomas Corwin. It is a 16-room frame house built in 1818 by Phineas Ross.
