= Oregonia, Ohio =

Unincorporated community in Ohio, US

Coordinates: 39°27′03″N 84°05′46″W

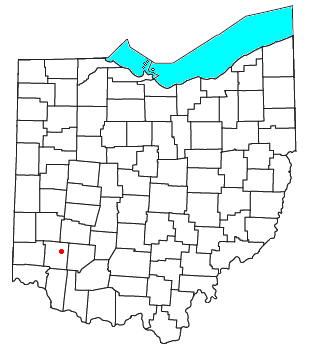
Location of Oregonia, Ohio

Oregonia is an unincorporated community in northwestern Washington Township, Warren County, Ohio, United States, on the east shore of the Little Miami River about five miles northeast of Lebanon and six miles south of Waynesville. The ZIP Code for Oregonia is 45054.

The first settlement there was around 1802, where there was a mill operated at various times by Nebo Gaunt, Ignatius Brown, and David Brown. Around 1820, it was known as Freeport. The Little Miami Railroad reached the village c. 1845. A post office called Oregon was established in 1846, and the name was changed to Oregonia in 1882. The post office has since been consolidated with the Lebanon post office.

Today, Oregonia is a stop on the Little Miami Bike Trail which follows the former train route along the Little Miami River. Bikers, hikers, and canoers often stop at the market or a restaurant along the trail which follows the river on the former train route. In October of each year, the "Devils Staircase" motorcycle hill climb is held on a hill just south of the main settlement.
