= Waynesville, Ohio =

- Village
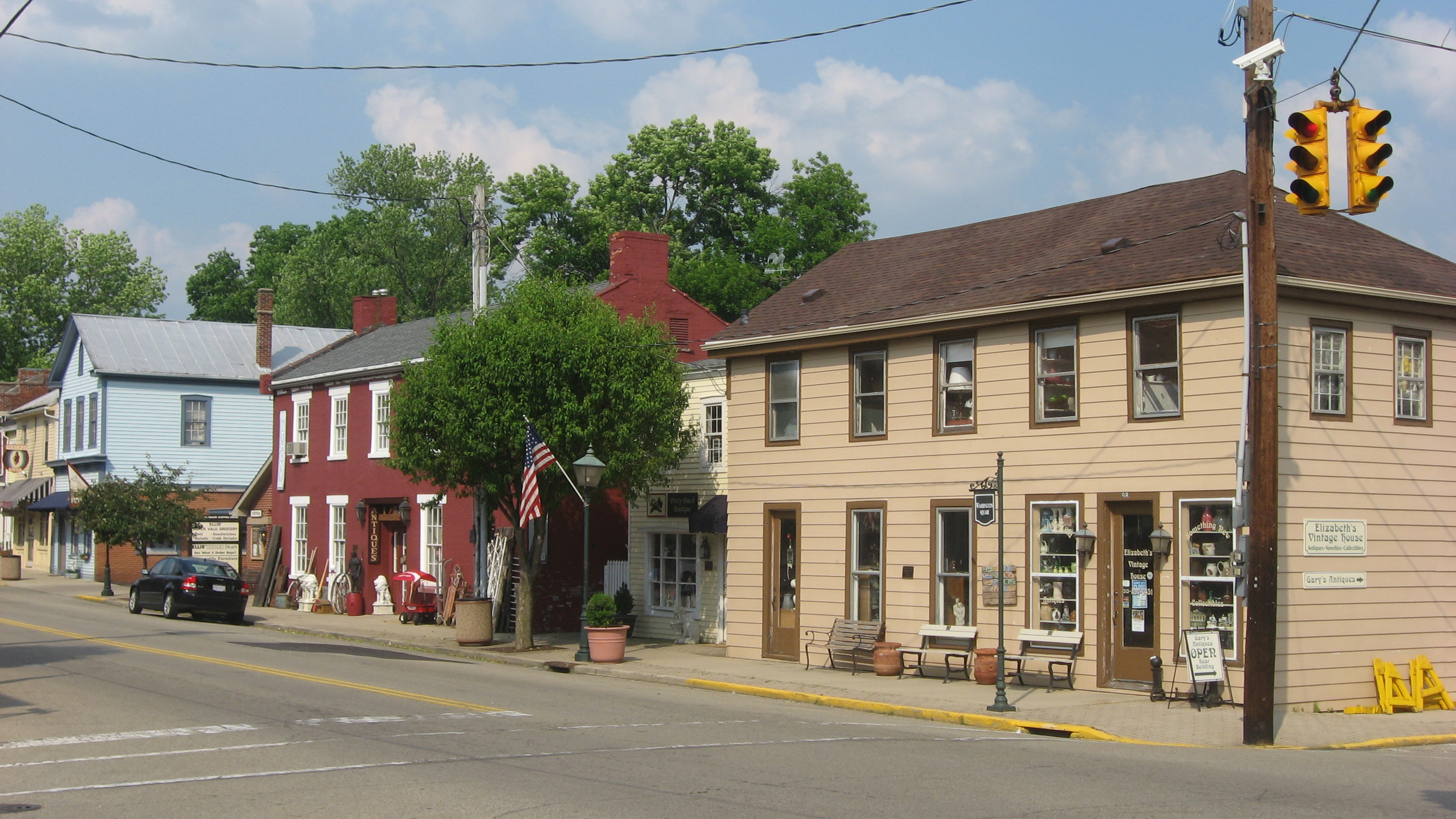
- Central Waynesville
- Interactive map of Waynesville, Ohio
- Coordinates: 39°31′59″N 84°05′25″W
- Country: United States
- State: Ohio
- County: Warren

Area
  - Total: 2.37 sq mi (6.13 km^{2})
  - Land: 2.36 sq mi (6.12 km^{2})
  - Water: 0.0077 sq mi (0.02 km^{2})
- Elevation: 856 ft (261 m)

Population (2020)
  - Total: 2,669
  - Density: 1,129.7/sq mi (436.18/km^{2})
- Area codes: 513
- FIPS code: 39-82418
- GNIS feature ID: 2400117
- Website: www.villageofwaynesville.org

Waynesville is a village in Wayne Township, Warren County, Ohio, United States. The population was 2,669 at the 2020 census. It is named for General "Mad" Anthony Wayne. The village, located at the crossroads of U.S. Route 42 and State Route 73, is known for its antique stores and its annual sauerkraut festival. Caesar Creek State Park is located 5 miles (8.0 km) east of the village.

Waynesville is served by the Mary L. Cook Public Library. In 2005, the library loaned more than 203,000 items to its 8,000 cardholders. Total holdings in 2005 were over 67,000 volumes with over 110 periodical subscriptions.

== Geography ==
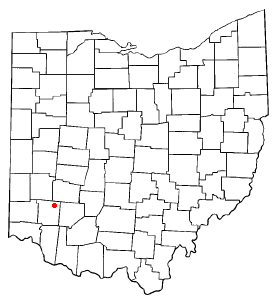
Location of Waynesville, Ohio

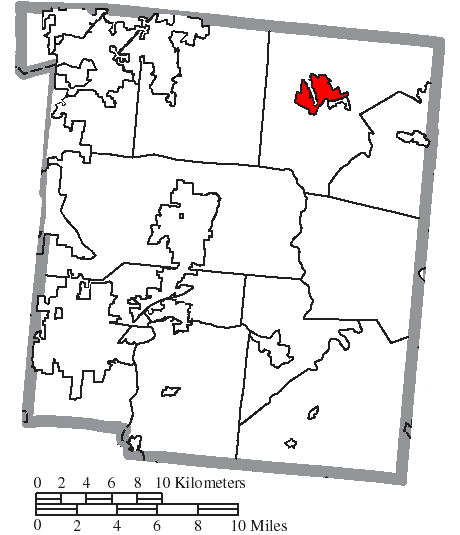
Location of Waynesville in Warren County

According to the United States Census Bureau, the village has a total area of 2.39 square miles (6.19 km^{2}), of which 2.38 square miles (6.16 km^{2}) is land and 0.01 square miles (0.03 km^{2}) is water.

Little Miami River is the only river that flows through Waynesville.

== History ==
Waynesville was laid out in 1796. It was named in honor of General “Mad” Anthony Wayne. Waynesville was originally built up chiefly by Quakers. A post office has been in operation at Waynesville since 1804.

== Demographics ==
Historical population
Census	Pop.	Note	%±
1830	439		—
1840	592		34.9%
1850	744		25.7%
1860	829		11.4%
1870	745		−10.1%
1880	793		6.4%
1890	704		−11.2%
1900	723		2.7%
1910	705		−2.5%
1920	668		−5.2%
1930	697		4.3%
1940	833		19.5%
1950	1,016		22.0%
1960	1,298		27.8%
1970	1,638		26.2%
1980	1,796		9.6%
1990	1,949		8.5%
2000	2,558		31.2%
2010	2,834		10.8%
2020	2,669		−5.8%
U.S. Decennial Census

=== 2010 census ===
As of the census of 2010, there were 2,834 people, 1,128 households, and 761 families living in the village. The population density was 1,190.8 inhabitants per square mile (459.8/km^{2}). There were 1,196 housing units at an average density of 502.5 per square mile (194.0/km^{2}). The racial makeup of the village was 96.8% White, 0.4% African American, 0.1% Native American, 0.4% Asian, 0.1% Pacific Islander, 0.1% from other races, and 2.1% from two or more races. Hispanic or Latino of any race were 1.2% of the population.

There were 1,128 households, of which 32.4% had children under the age of 18 living with them, 50.7% were married couples living together, 11.8% had a female householder with no husband present, 5.0% had a male householder with no wife present, and 32.5% were non-families. 29.0% of all households were made up of individuals, and 16.7% had someone living alone who was 65 years of age or older. The average household size was 2.42 and the average family size was 2.98.

The median age in the village was 41.6 years. 23.9% of residents were under the age of 18; 8.3% were between the ages of 18 and 24; 23.3% were from 25 to 44; 26.6% were from 45 to 64; and 17.9% were 65 years of age or older. The gender makeup of the village was 46.9% male and 53.1% female.

=== 2000 census ===
As of the census of 2000, there were 2,558 people, 1,005 households, and 721 families living in the village. The population density was 1,124.8 inhabitants per square mile (434.3/km^{2}). There were 1,037 housing units at an average density of 456.0 per square mile (176.1/km^{2}). The racial makeup of the village was 98.32% White, 0.08% African American, 0.23% Native American, 0.08% Asian, 0.16% from other races, and 1.13% from two or more races. Hispanic or Latino of any race were 0.74% of the population.

There were 1,005 households, out of which 36.8% had children under the age of 18 living with them, 59.6% were married couples living together, 9.4% had a female householder with no husband present, and 28.2% were non-families. 24.8% of all households were made up of individuals, and 12.5% had someone living alone who was 65 years of age or older. The average household size was 2.54 and the average family size was 3.04.

In the village, the population was spread out, with 27.4% under the age of 18, 6.5% from 18 to 24, 31.4% from 25 to 44, 22.0% from 45 to 64, and 12.6% who were 65 years of age or older. The median age was 36 years. For every 100 females there were 89.5 males. For every 100 females age 18 and over, there were 82.5 males.

The median income for a household in the village was $50,202, and the median income for a family was $56,538. Males had a median income of $41,932 versus $31,207 for females. The per capita income for the village was $24,539. About 1.9% of families and 3.9% of the population were below the poverty line, including 3.3% of those under age 18 and 5.5% of those age 65 or over.

== Events ==
=== Sauerkraut Festival ===
Waynesville has held an annual fall Sauerkraut Festival since 1970. Attendance is estimated to exceed 350,000 visitors each year.

== Notable people ==
- Seth W. Brown, Congressman from 1897 to 1901.
- John Evans, founder of Northwestern University and the University of Denver, Governor of Colorado
- William R. Hoel, officer in the United States Navy during the Civil War
- Harvey A. Surface, zoologist and state congressman
