= Ohio Secretary of State elections =

Seal of the Ohio Secretary of State

The voters of the U.S. state of Ohio elect a secretary of state for a four-year term.

| Year | Democratic | Republican | Other |
|---|---|---|---|
| 2022 | Chelsea Clark: 1,635,824 | Frank LaRose: 2,444,382 | Terpsehore Tore Maras (Independent): 42,753 |
| 2018 | Kathleen Clyde: 1,987,916 | Frank LaRose: 2,166,125 | Dustin R. Nanna (Libertarian): 99,808 |
| 2014 | Nina Turner: 1,074,475 | Jon A. Husted: 1,811,020 | Kevin Knedler (Libertarian) |
| 2010 | Maryellen O'Shaughnessy : 1,555,705 | Jon A. Husted : 2,013,674 | Charlie Earl (Libertarian) : 182,977 |
| 2006 | Jennifer L. Brunner : 2,104,114 | Greg Hartmann : 1,546,454 | Tim Kettler (G) : 78,080; John A. Eastman (I) : 94,706 |
| 2002 | Bryan Flannery : 1,256,428 | J. Kenneth Blackwell : 1,827,995 | |
| 1998 | Charleta B. Tavares: 1,404,081 | J. Kenneth Blackwell: 1,789,105 | |
| 1994 | Dan Brady: 1,150,460 | Robert A. Taft II: 2,116,258 | |
| 1990 | Sherrod Brown: 1,604,058 | Robert A. Taft II: 1,809,416 | |
| 1986 | Sherrod Brown: 1,805,833 | Vincent C. Campanella: 1,217,803 | |
| 1982 | Sherrod Brown: 1,739,602 | Virgil E. Brown: 1,362,079 | |
| 1978 | Anthony J. "Tony" Celebrezze Jr.: 1,365,219 | Ted W. Brown: 1,356,959 | |
| 1974 | Tony P. Hall: 1,343,603 | Ted W. Brown: 1,462,776 | |
| 1970 | John F. Kennedy: 1,362,041 | Ted W. Brown: 1,606,920 | |
| 1966 | James D. Nolan: 1,037,710 | Ted W. Brown: 1,674,600 | |
| 1962 | Charles L. Babcock | Ted W. Brown | |
| 1958 | Asher W. Sweeney: 1,464,726 | Ted W. Brown: 1,580,628 | |
| 1956 | Hubert Lynch: 1,336,885 | Ted W. Brown: 1,985,368 | |
| 1954 | Robert W. Reider: 1,069,526 | Ted W. Brown: 1,339,076 | |
| 1952 | Charles F. Sweeney: 1,522,908 | Ted W. Brown: 1,792,819 | |
| 1950 | Charles F. Sweeney: 1,339,492 | Ted W. Brown: 1,347,251 | |
| 1948 | Charles F. Sweeney: 1,501,305 | Edward J. Hummel: 1,310,704 | |
| 1946 | Charles F. Sweeney | Edward J. Hummel | |
| 1944 | A Lee Fair: 1,423,264 | Edward J. Hummel: 1,480,399 | |
| 1942 | John E. Sweeney: 738,175 | Edward J. Hummel: 926,523 | |
| 1940 (full) | John E. Sweeney: 1,562,021 | Edward J. Hummel: 1,453,513 | |
| 1940 (unex) | | | George M. Neffiner: 293,766 |
| 1922 | William D. Fulton : 685,818 | Thad H. Brown : 820,974 | |
| 1920 | William D. Fulton : 749,566 | Harvey C. Smith : 1,134,657 | George Markert (soc) : 43,467; Jasper Shuman (ST) : 1,525 |
| 1918 | William D. Fulton : 432,422 | Harvey C. Smith : 471,228 | |
| 1916 | William D. Fulton : 564,509 | Charles Q. Hildebrant : 543,873 | M. J. Beery : 38,136; Seymour E. Fox : 6,837 |
| 1914 | J. H. Secrest : 451,131 | Charles Q. Hildebrant : 488,010 | Frank W. Woods (Progressive) : 53,808; Nathan Wycoff (Socialist) : 53,575 |
| 1912 | Charles H. Graves :432,082 | Thomas L. Lewis : 283,767 | John L. Sullivan (Progressive): 208,458; Edward S. Smith (Socialist) : 88,914; Addison Taylor (Prohibition) : 12,028; William R. Fox (Soc. Labor) : 2,767 |
| 1910 | Charles H. Graves : 423,580 | Granville W. Mooney : 405,375 | Edward Hasenauer (Socialist) : 61,656; Alfred H. Stratton (Prohibition) : 7,104; William R. Fox (Soc. Labor) : 2,881 |
| 1908 | J. H. Newman : 518,225 | Carmi Thompson :556,073 | Arthur B. Hollenbaugh (Soc) : 31,681; Henry J. Haskel (Pro) : 10,615; Albert Boswell (Ind) : 509; Timothy Crabtree (Peoples) : 150; James Rugg (Soc Lab) : 845 |
| 1906 | Samuel A. Hoskins : 351,676 | Carmi Thompson : 408,066 | Olly J. Henslee (Socialist) : 18,432; Alfred F. Hughes (Pro) : 11,970; Max Eisenberg (Soc Lab) : 2,211 |
| 1904 | Alfred P. Sandles : 357,179 | Lewis C. Laylin : 587,568 | Harold King Rockhill (Pro) : 19,253; Alfred J. Swing (Socialist) : 33,763; John H T Juergens (Soc Lab) : 2,534; John E. Allen (Peoples) : 1,093 |
| 1902 | Herbert S. Bigelow : 345,706 | Lewis C. Laylin : 436,171 | Andrew L. White (Pro) : 12,336; Max S. Hayes (Socialist): 14,359; Theodore Adams (Soc Lab) : 2,983 |
| 1900 | Henry H. McFadden : 474,078 | Lewis C. Laylin : 543,389 | Frank Frankenberg (Union Ref) : 4,647; J. Knox Montgomery (Pro) : 9,983; Samuel Borton (Soc Lab) : 1,707; Louis F. Hemse (Soc Dem) : 4,650 |
| 1898 | Upton K. Guthrey : 347,074 | Charles Kinney : 408,213 | Thomas Brown (Pro) : 7,689; John F. Flynn (Soc Lab) : 5,793; John A. Graft (Union Ref): 10,911 |
| 1896 | Chilton A. White 473,462 | Charles Kinney 525,000 | Samuel H Rockhill (Pro) 5,469; Wesley C. Bates (Nat) 3,382; Daniel W. Wallace (Social Labor) 1,234 |
| 1894 | Milton Turner 276,902 | Samuel M. Taylor 413,988 | Charles R. Martin (Pop) 49,495; Mark G. McCaslin (Pro) 23,273 |
| 1892 | William A. Taylor 401,451 | Samuel M. Taylor 402,540 | |
| 1890 | Thaddeus E. Cromley 352,579 | Daniel J. Ryan 363,548 | Melanathon C. Lockwood (Pro) 23,837; Ezekial T. Curtis(UL) 1,752 |
| 1888 | Boston G. Young 395,522 | Daniel J. Ryan 416,510 | Walter S. Payne (Pro) 24,618; George F Ebner (UL) 3,452 |
| 1886 | John McBride 329,314 | James S. Robinson 341,095 | Henry R. Smith (Pro) 28,982; Charles Bonsall (labor) 2,010 |
| 1884 | James W. Newman 380,355 | James S. Robinson 391,597 | Evan J. Morris (Pro) 8,607; Peter M. Harrold (Greenback) 3,475 |
| 1882 | James W. Newman 316,874 | Charles Townsend 279,759 | Ferdinand Schumacher (Pro) 12,202; George L. Hafer (Greenback) 5,345 |
| 1880 | William Lang 343,016 | Charles Townsend 362,021 | Charles A. Lloyd (Greenback) 6,786; William A. Doan (Pro) 2,815 |
| 1878 | David R. Paige 270,966 | Milton Barnes 274,120 | Andrew Roy (NGL) 38,332; Jeremiah N. Robinson (Pro) 5,682 |
| 1876 | William Bell, Jr. 311,220 | Milton Barnes 317,856 | Edward S. Chapman (Pro) 1,863 |
| 1874 | William Bell, Jr. 238,406 | Allen T. Wikoff 221,204 | John R. Buchtel (Pro) 7,815 |
| 1872 | Aquila Wiley 251,778 | Allen T. Wikoff 265,925 | Ferdinand Schumacher (Pro) 2,035 |
| 1870 | William Heisley 205,014 | Isaac R. Sherwood 221,709 | Jay Odell (Pro) 2,862 |
| 1868 | Thomas Hubbard 249,681 | Isaac R. Sherwood 267,065 | |
| 1866 | Benjamin Le Fevre 213,606 | William H. Smith 256,302 | |
| 1864 | William W. Armstrong 183,842 | William H. Smith 238,145 | |
| 1862 | William W. Armstrong 184,315 | Wilson S. Kennon 178,755 | |
| 1861 | William W. Armstrong 151,912 | Benjamin Rush Cowen 207,352 | |
| 1859 | Jacob Reinhard 170,400 | Addison P. Russell 184,839 | |
| 1857 | Jacob Reinhard 158,832 | Addison P. Russell 160,638 | |
| 1855 | William Trevitt 133,641 | James H. Baker 168,724 | |
| 1853 | William Trevitt : 151,818 | William Graham (Freesoil) : 33,518 | Nelson H. Van Vorhes (Whig) : 97,500 |
| 1851 | William Trevitt : 145,636 | Henry W. King (Freesoil) : 15,768 | Earl Bill (Whig) : 120,256 |
