= 1922 Ohio gubernatorial election =

- November 7, 1922
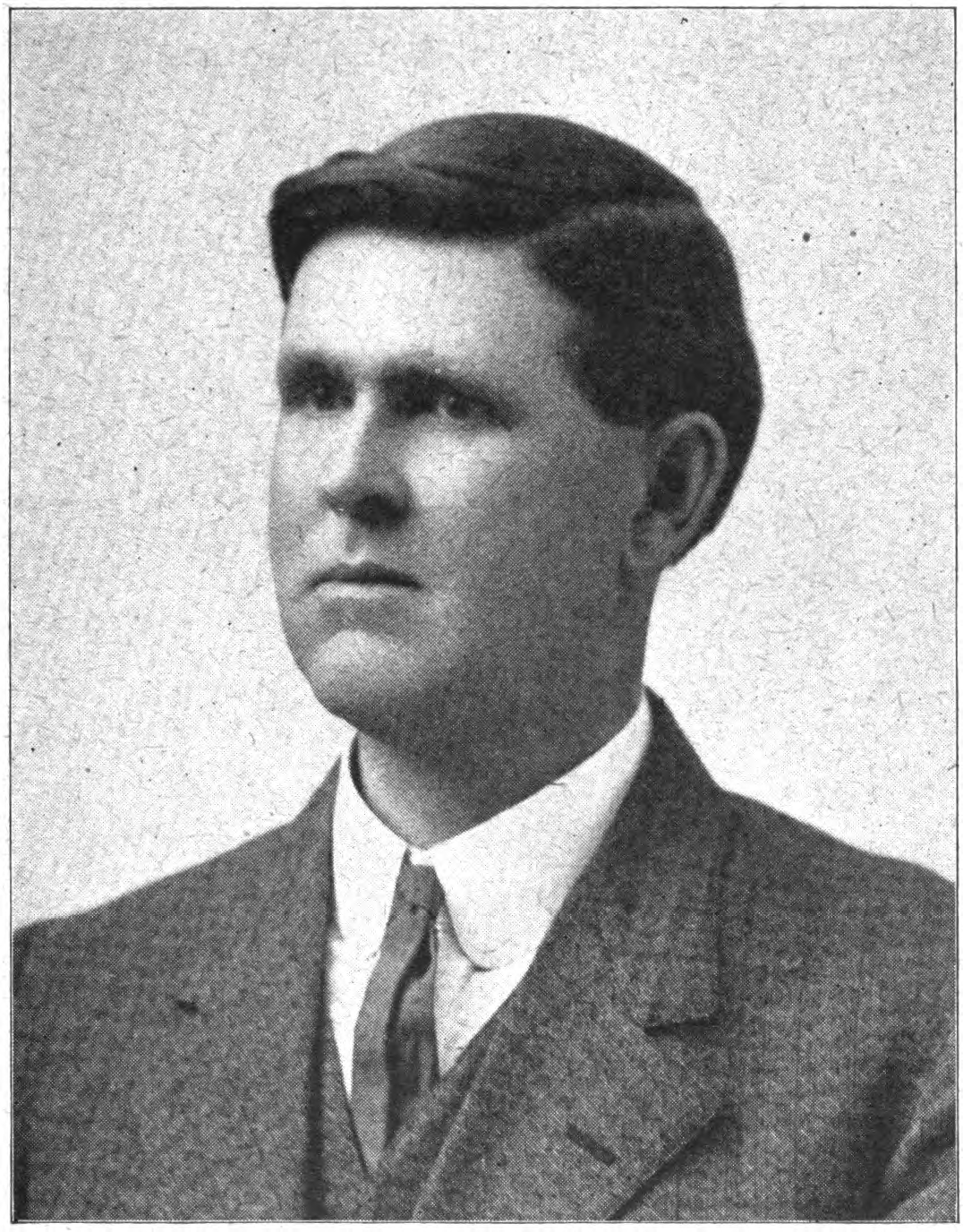

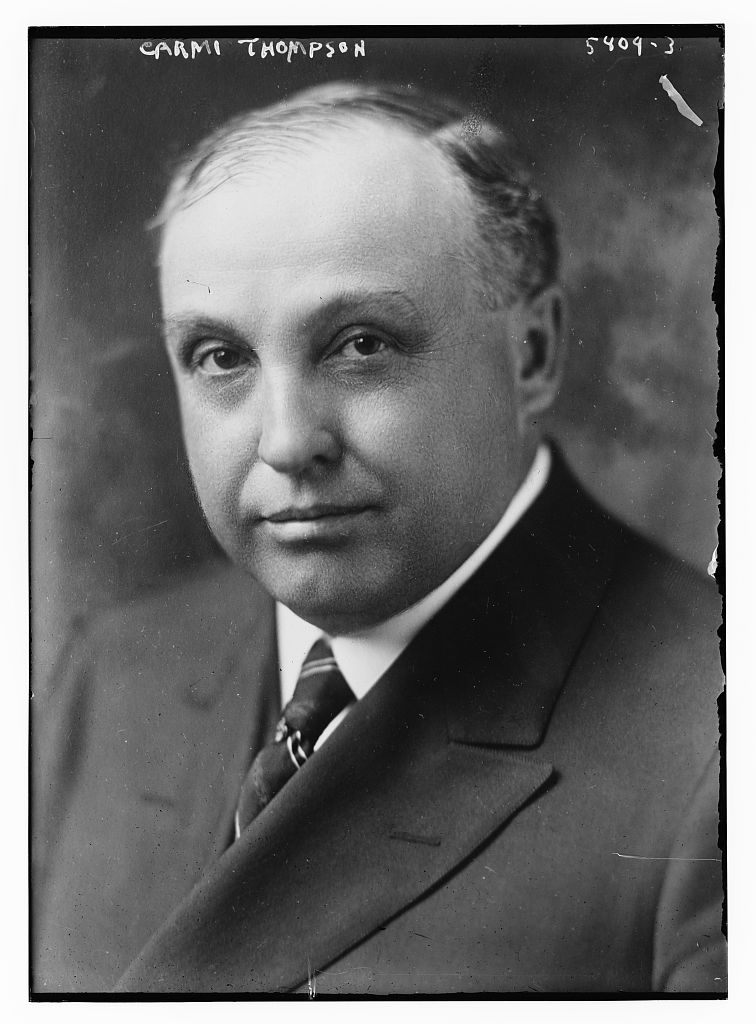
Nominee	A. Victor Donahey	Carmi Thompson
Party	Democratic	Republican
Popular vote	821,948	803,300
Percentage	50.56%	49.41%
- County results Donahey: 50–60% 60–70% 70–80% Thompson: 50–60% 60–70% 70–80%
Governor before election
Harry L. Davis
Republican
Elected Governor
A. Victor Donahey
Democratic

The 1922 Ohio gubernatorial election was held on November 7, 1922. Democratic nominee A. Victor Donahey narrowly defeated Republican nominee Carmi Thompson with 50.56% of the vote.

== Primary elections ==
Primary elections were held on August 8, 1922.

=== Republican primary ===
==== Candidates ====
- Carmi Thompson, former Treasurer of the United States
- Charles Landon Knight, U.S. Representative
- Homer Durand
- Harvey C. Smith, Ohio Secretary of State
- Arthur H. Day, State Senator
- Rupert R. Beetham, Speaker of the Ohio House of Representatives
- Henry Clay Smith, former State Representative
- Daniel W. Williams
- J. W. Durnell

==== Results ====
Republican primary results
Party	Candidate	Votes	%
Republican	Carmi Thompson	190,408	40.99
Republican	Charles Landon Knight	75,422	16.24
Republican	Homer Durand	55,443	11.94
Republican	Harvey C. Smith	51,391	11.06
Republican	Arthur H. Day	38,538	8.30
Republican	Rupert R. Beetham	16,851	3.63
Republican	Henry Clay Smith	15,795	3.40
Republican	Daniel W. Williams	14,810	3.19
Republican	J. W. Durnell	5,881	1.27
Total votes		464,539	100.00

== General election ==
=== Candidates ===
- A. Victor Donahey, Democratic
- Carmi Thompson, Republican

=== Results ===
1922 Ohio gubernatorial election
Party	Candidate	Votes	%	±%
Democratic	A. Victor Donahey	821,948	50.56%	
Republican	Carmi Thompson	803,300	49.41%	
Majority		18,648		
Turnout				
Democratic gain from Republican		Swing		
