= 1978 Ohio Secretary of State election =

- November 7, 1978
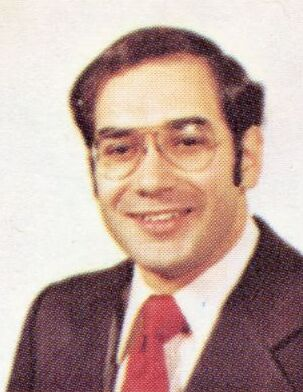

Nominee	Anthony J. Celebrezze Jr.	Ted W. Brown
Party	Democratic	Republican
Popular vote	1,365,219	1,356,959
Percentage	50.15%	49.85%
- County results Celebrezze: 50–60% 60–70% Brown: 50–60% 60–70%
Secretary of State before election
Ted W. Brown
Republican
Elected Secretary of State
Anthony J. Celebrezze Jr.
Democratic

The 1978 Ohio Secretary of State election was held on November 7, 1978, to elect the Ohio Secretary of State. Primaries were held on June 6, 1978. Democratic Ohio State Senator Anthony J. Celebrezze Jr. defeated longtime Republican incumbent Ohio Secretary of State Ted W. Brown by a razor-thin margin of 0.3 percentage points.

== Republican primary ==
=== Candidates ===
- Ted W. Brown, incumbent Ohio Secretary of State (1951–1979)

=== Campaign ===
Brown won renomination without opposition.

=== Results ===
Republican primary results
Party	Candidate	Votes	%
Republican	Ted W. Brown	481,714	100%
Total votes		481,714	100%

== Democratic primary ==
=== Candidates ===
- Anthony J. Celebrezze Jr., Ohio State Senator (1975–1978)

=== Campaign ===
Celebrezze won the Democratic nomination unopposed.

=== Results ===
Democratic primary results
Party	Candidate	Votes	%
Democratic	Anthony J. Celebrezze Jr.	478,779	100%
Total votes		478,779	100%

== General election ==
=== Candidates ===
- Anthony J. Celebrezze Jr., Ohio State Senator (1975–1978) (Democratic)
- Ted W. Brown, incumbent Ohio Secretary of State (1951–1979)

=== Results ===
1978 Ohio Secretary of State election results
Party	Candidate	Votes	%	±%
Democratic	Anthony J. Celebrezze Jr.	1,365,219	50.15%	+2.27%
Republican	Ted W. Brown (Incumbent)	1,356,959	49.85%	−2.27%
Total votes		2,722,178	100.0%	
Democratic gain from Republican				
