= 1970 Ohio Secretary of State election =

- November 3, 1970

| Nominee | Ted W. Brown | John F. Kennedy |
| Party | Republican | Democratic |
| Popular vote | 1,606,920 | 1,362,041 |
| Percentage | 54.12% | 45.88% |
- County results Brown: 50–60% 60–70% 70–80% Kennedy: 50–60%
Secretary of State before election
Ted W. Brown
Republican
Elected Secretary of State
Ted W. Brown
Republican

The 1970 Ohio Secretary of State election was held on November 3, 1970, to elect the Ohio Secretary of State. Primaries were held on May 5, 1970. Republican incumbent Ohio Secretary of State Ted W. Brown won the election, defeating Democrat John F. Kennedy (no relation to the former president) with 54.12% of the popular vote.

== Republican primary ==
=== Candidates ===
- Ted W. Brown, incumbent Ohio Secretary of State (1951–1979)

=== Campaign ===
Brown won renomination unopposed.

=== Results ===
Republican primary results
| Party | Candidate | Votes | % |
|---|---|---|---|
| Republican | Ted W. Brown | 779,735 | 100% |
| Total votes | | 779,735 | 100% |

== Democratic primary ==
=== Candidates ===
- John F. Kennedy
- Robert E. Cecile

=== Campaign ===
Kennedy easily won the nomination over Cecile, winning with almost 60% of the vote.

=== Results ===
Democratic primary results
| Party | Candidate | Votes | % |
|---|---|---|---|
| Democratic | John F. Kennedy | 435,749 | 59.63% |
| Democratic | Robert E. Cecile | 295,036 | 40.37% |
| Total votes | | 730,785 | 100% |

== General election ==
=== Candidates ===
- Ted W. Brown, incumbent Ohio Secretary of State (1951–1979) (Republican)
- John F. Kennedy (Democratic)

=== Results ===
1970 Ohio Secretary of State general election results
| Party | Candidate | Votes | % | ±% |
|---|---|---|---|---|
| Republican | Ted W. Brown | 1,606,920 | 54.12% | −7.62% |
| Democratic | John F. Kennedy | 1,362,041 | 45.88% | +7.62% |
| Total votes | | 2,968,961 | 100.00% | |
| Republican hold | | | | |
