= 1974 Ohio Secretary of State election =

- November 5, 1974

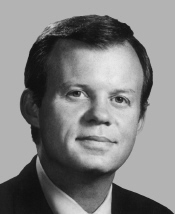
Nominee	Ted W. Brown	Tony P. Hall
Party	Republican	Democratic
Popular vote	1,462,776	1,343,603
Percentage	52.12%	47.88%
- County results Brown: 50–60% 60–70% Hall: 50–60% 60–70%
Secretary of State before election
Ted W. Brown
Republican
Elected Secretary of State
Ted W. Brown
Republican

The 1974 Ohio secretary of state election was held on November 5, 1974, to elect the Ohio secretary of state. Primaries were held on May 7, 1974. Republican incumbent Ohio Secretary of State Ted W. Brown narrowly won re-election to a ninth term in office, defeating Democratic Ohio State Senator Tony P. Hall by four percentage points.

== Republican primary ==
=== Candidates ===
- Ted W. Brown, incumbent Ohio secretary of state (1951–1979)

=== Campaign ===
Brown won renomination without opposition.

=== Results ===
Republican primary results
Party	Candidate	Votes	%
Republican	Ted W. Brown	502,736	100%
Total votes		502,736	100%

== Democratic primary ==
=== Candidates ===
- R. Kent Bell
- Beverly A. Bingle
- William K. Brown
- Tony P. Hall, Ohio state senator (1973–1979)
- John F. Kennedy
- Dennis E. Thompson

=== Campaign ===
Hall won a crowded primary with only 28.11% of the vote, two points ahead of his closest opponent, William K. Brown.

=== Results ===
Democratic primary results
Party	Candidate	Votes	%
Democratic	Tony P. Hall	233,779	28.11%
Democratic	William K. Brown	213,084	25.62%
Democratic	John F. Kennedy	183,147	22.02%
Democratic	Beverly A. Bingle	87,095	10.47%
Democratic	Dennis E. Thompson	62,242	7.48%
Democratic	R. Kent Bell	52,297	6.29%
Total votes		831,644	100%

== General election ==
=== Candidates ===
- Ted W. Brown, incumbent Ohio secretary of state (1951–1979) (Republican)
- Tony P. Hall, Ohio state senator (1973–1979) (Democratic)

=== Results ===
1974 Ohio secretary of state general election results
Party	Candidate	Votes	%	±%
Republican	Ted W. Brown	1,462,776	52.12%	−2%
Democratic	Tony P. Hall	1,343,603	47.88%	+2%
Total votes		2,806,379	100.00%	
Republican hold				
