= Benjamin Cowen =

Benjamin Cowen may refer to:

- Benjamin S. Cowen (1793–1860), U.S. Representative from Ohio
- Benjamin R. Cowen (1831–1908), Union Army general and politician in Ohio
