= 1966 Ohio Secretary of State election =

- November 8, 1966

Nominee	Ted W. Brown	James D. Nolan
Party	Republican	Democratic
Popular vote	1,674,600	1,037,710
Percentage	61.74%	38.26%
- County results Brown: 50–60% 60–70% 70–80% Nolan: 50–60%
Secretary of State before election
Ted W. Brown
Republican
Elected Secretary of State
Ted W. Brown
Republican

The 1966 Ohio Secretary of State election was held on November 8, 1966, to elect the Ohio Secretary of State. Primaries were held on May 3, 1966. Incumbent Republican Ohio Secretary of State Ted W. Brown won re-election in a landslide, defeating Democratic political activist James D. Nolan with 61.74% of the vote.

== Republican primary ==
=== Candidates ===
- Ted W. Brown, incumbent Ohio Secretary of State (1951–1979)

=== Results ===
Republican primary results
Party	Candidate	Votes	%
Republican	Ted W. Brown	574,149	100%
Total votes		574,149	100%

== Democratic primary ==
=== Candidates ===
- James D. Nolan, political activist
- James H. Bell, Cleveland City Council Member

=== Campaign ===
Nolan narrowly won the Democratic nomination, defeating Cleveland City Council Member James H. Bell by 6 percentage points.

=== Results ===
Democratic primary results
Party	Candidate	Votes	%
Democratic	James D. Nolan	262,819	53.17%
Democratic	James H. Bell	231,435	46.83%
Total votes		494,254	100%

== General election ==
=== Candidates ===
- Ted W. Brown, incumbent Ohio Secretary of State (1951–1979) (Republican)
- James D. Nolan, political activist (Democratic)

=== Results ===
1966 Ohio Secretary of State general election results
Party	Candidate	Votes	%	±%
Republican	Ted W. Brown	1,674,600	61.74%	+1%
Democratic	James D. Nolan	1,037,710	38.26%	−1%
Total votes		2,712,310	100.00%	
Republican hold				
