= Senator Newman =

Senator Newman may refer to:

- Alexander Newman (1804–1849), Virginia State Senate
- Alfred Newman (jurist) (1834–1898), Wisconsin State Senate
- James W. Newman (1841–1901), Ohio State Senate
- Josh Newman (politician) (born 1964), California State Senate
- Scott Newman (politician) (born 1947), Minnesota State Senate
- Stephen Newman (born 1964), Virginia State Senate
- Tazewell W. Newman (1822–1868), Tennessee State Senate

== See also ==
- Senator Neumann (disambiguation)
