= General Cowan =

General Cowan may refer to:

- David Tennant Cowan (1896–1983), British Indian Army major general
- James Cowan (British Army officer) (born 1964), British Army major general
- Samuel Cowan (born 1941), British Army general

== See also ==
- John Cowans (1862–1921), British Army general
- Benjamin R. Cowen (1831–1908), Union Army brevet brigadier general
