= Freeman T. Eagleson =

American lawyer

Freeman T Eagleson
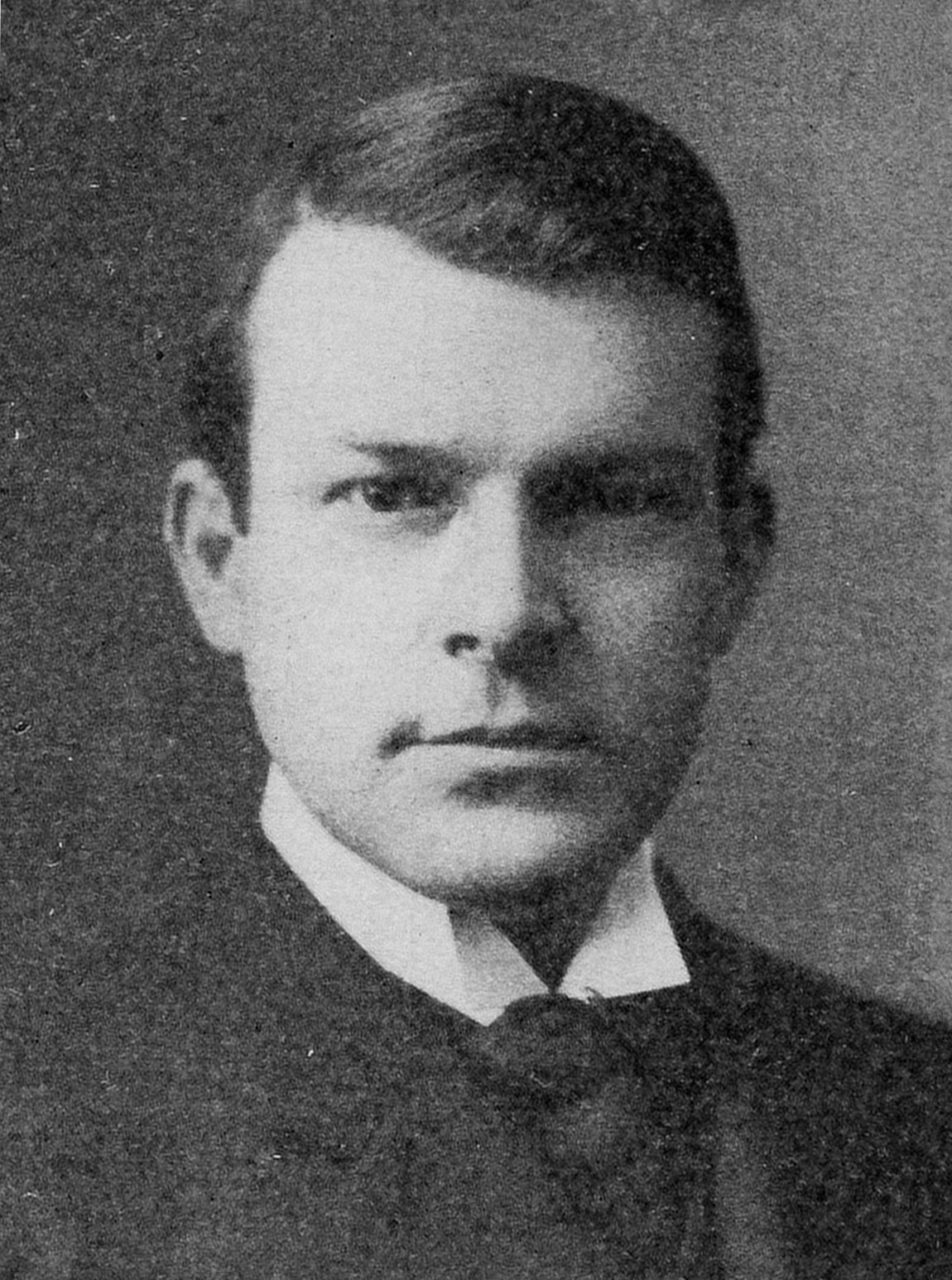
- Born: October 4, 1876; Guernsey County, Ohio
- Died: January 12, 1967 (aged 90)
- Resting place: Green Lawn Cemetery (Columbus, Ohio)
- Education: Muskingum College

Freeman T. Eagleson (October 4, 1876 – January 12, 1967) was a Republican politician in the U.S. State of Ohio who was Speaker of the Ohio House of Representatives 1907–1908.

Freeman T. Eagleson was born in Guernsey County, Ohio and attended common schools, Washington High School, and Muskingum College. He taught school for six years. He studied law starting in 1901 with the firm Locke and Turnbaugh in Cambridge, and finishing at Ohio State University Moritz College of Law. He was admitted to the bar December 1904.

After the death of his former instructor, Mr. Locke, Eagleson became the junior partner of Mr. Turnaugh, at Turnbaugh & Eagleson, Cambridge, Ohio. Eagleson was a member of the Ohio House of Representatives in the 76th General Assembly (1904–1905), and was selected Speaker pro tem in the 77th, (1906–1908). When Speaker Carmi Thompson was elected Ohio Secretary of State, with term starting in 1907, Eagleson was elevated to Speaker of the House.

Eagleson died January 12, 1967, and is interred at Green Lawn Cemetery (Columbus, Ohio).

Ohio House of Representatives
| Preceded by Carmi Thompson | Speaker of the House; 1907–1908 | Succeeded by Granville W. Mooney |
