= 1986 Ohio Secretary of State election =

- November 4, 1986
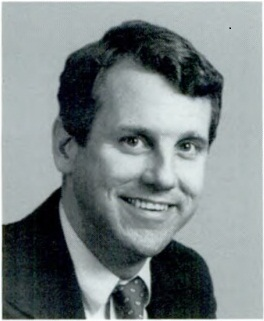

Nominee	Sherrod Brown	Vincent C. Campanella
Party	Democratic	Republican
Popular vote	1,805,833	1,217,803
Percentage	59.72%	40.28%
- County results Brown: 50–60% 60–70% 70–80% Campanella: 50–60%
Secretary of State before election
Sherrod Brown
Democratic
Elected Secretary of State
Sherrod Brown
Democratic

The 1986 Ohio secretary of state election was held on November 4, 1986, to elect the Ohio secretary of state. Democratic incumbent Ohio secretary of state Sherrod Brown easily won re-election in a landslide, defeating Republican challenger Cuyahoga County commissioner Vincent Campanella by nearly 20 percentage points.

== Democratic primary ==
=== Candidates ===
- Sherrod Brown, incumbent Ohio Secretary of State (1983–1991)

=== Campaign ===
The Democratic primary was held on May 6, 1986. Sherrod Brown won renomination without opposition.

=== Results ===
Democratic primary results
Party	Candidate	Votes	%
Democratic	Sherrod Brown	601,117	100%
Total votes		601,117	100.00%

== Republican primary ==
=== Candidates ===
- Vincent C. Campanella, Cuyahoga County Commissioner (1981–1985)

=== Campaign ===
The Republican primary was held on May 6, 1986. Vincent C. Campanella won the Republican nomination unopposed.

=== Results ===
Republican primary results
Party	Candidate	Votes	%
Republican	Vincent C. Campanella	531,936	100%
Total votes		531,936	100.00%

== General election ==
=== Candidates ===
- Sherrod Brown, incumbent Ohio Secretary of State (1983–1991) (Democratic)
- Vincent C. Campanella, Cuyahoga County Commissioner (1981–1985) (Republican)

=== Results ===
1986 Ohio Secretary of State election results
Party	Candidate	Votes	%	±%
Democratic	Sherrod Brown (Incumbent)	1,805,833	59.72%	+6.12
Republican	Vincent C. Campanella	1,217,803	40.28%	−1.69%
Total votes		3,023,636	100.00%	
Democratic hold				
