= Ray C. Wakefield =

Commissioner of the Federal Communications Commission
- In office March 22, 1941 – June 30, 1947
- President: Franklin D. Roosevelt; Harry S. Truman
- Preceded by: Thad H. Brown
- Succeeded by: Robert Franklin Jones

Personal details
- Born: August 12, 1895; Fresno, California
- Died: September 29, 1949 (aged 54); Washington, D.C.
- Political party: Republican

Ray C. Wakefield (August 12, 1895 – September 29, 1949) was an American attorney who served as a Commissioner of the Federal Communications Commission from 1941 to 1947.
