= Senator Neumann =

Senator Neumann may refer to:

- Cora Neumann (fl. 2020s), Montana State Senate
- Henry Neumann (born 1950), Senate of Puerto Rico
- Paul Neumann (Attorney General) (1839–1901), California State Senate

== See also ==
- Senator Newman (disambiguation)
