= Centerburg, Ohio =

- Village
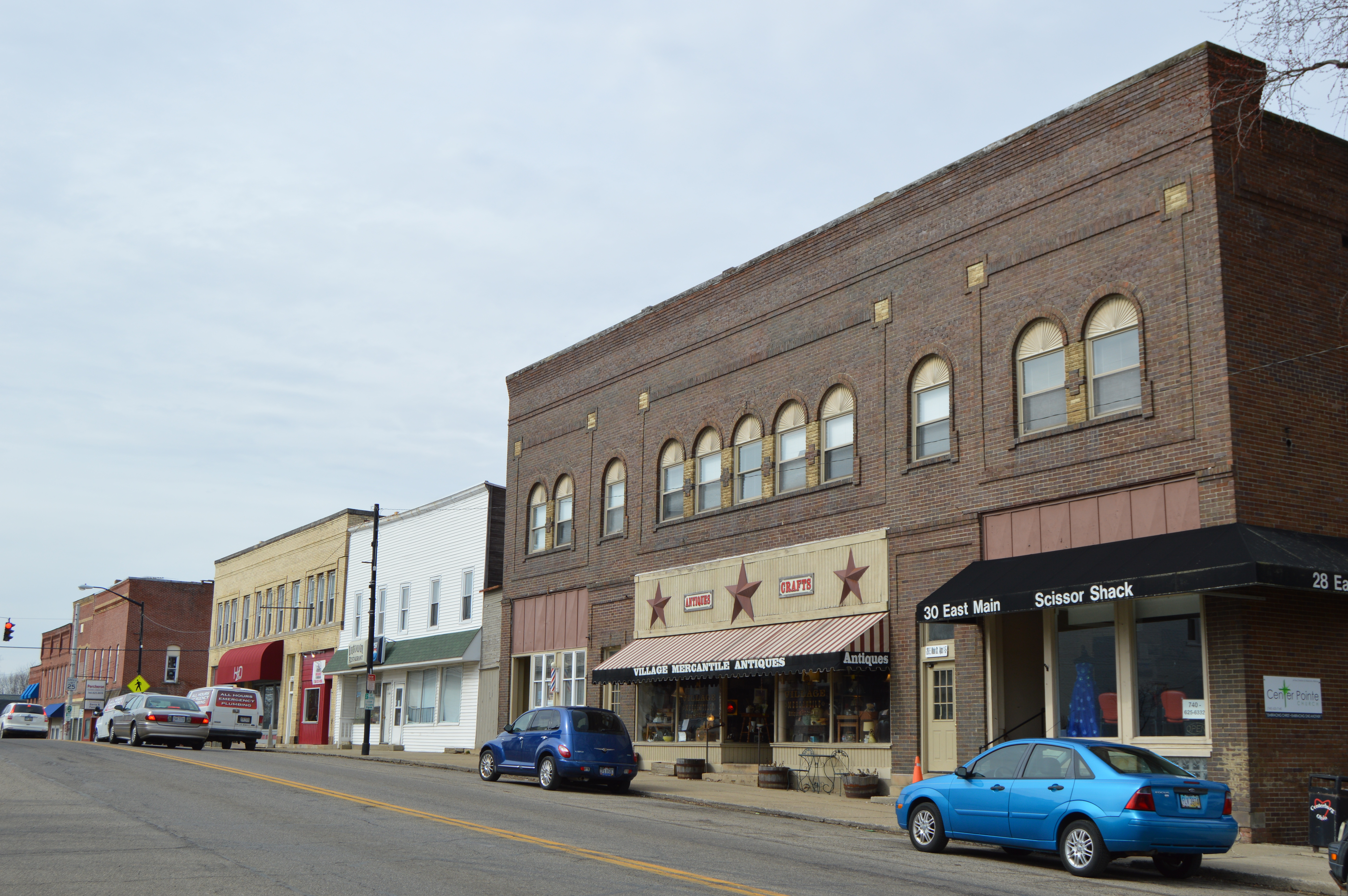
- Main Street downtown
- Nicknames: The True Heart of Ohio, Douglasland
- Location of Centerburg, Ohio

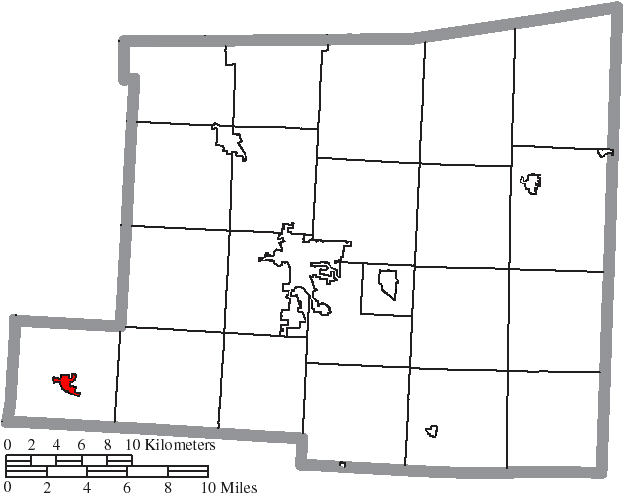
- Location of Centerburg in Knox County
- Coordinates: 40°18′14″N 82°41′52″W
- Country: United States
- State: Ohio
- County: Knox
- Township: Hilliar

Area
  - Total: 0.97 sq mi (2.51 km^{2})
  - Land: 0.97 sq mi (2.50 km^{2})
  - Water: 0.0039 sq mi (0.01 km^{2})
- Elevation: 1,207 ft (368 m)

Population (2020)
  - Total: 1,690
  - Estimate (2023): 1,671
  - Density: 1,747.9/sq mi (674.85/km^{2})
- Time zone: UTC-5 (Eastern (EST))
  - Summer (DST): UTC-4 (EDT)
- ZIP code: 43011
- Area codes: 740, 220
- FIPS code: 39-13036
- GNIS feature ID: 2397588
- Website: www.centerburgoh.org

Centerburg is a village in Knox County, Ohio, United States, along the North Fork of the Licking River. As of the 2020 census, the village population was 1,690. Centerburg is located near the geographical center of Ohio.

== History ==
Centerburg (formerly rendered Centreburgh) was laid out in 1830. The village was so named on account of its location near Ohio's geographical center. A post office has been in operation at Centerburg since 1835.

== Geography ==
According to the United States Census Bureau, the village has a total area of 0.90 square miles (2.33 km^{2}), all land.

== Demographics ==
Historical population
Census	Pop.	Note	%±
1880	400		—
1890	588		47.0%
1900	706		20.1%
1910	723		2.4%
1920	775		7.2%
1930	761		−1.8%
1940	779		2.4%
1950	887		13.9%
1960	963		8.6%
1970	1,038		7.8%
1980	1,275		22.8%
1990	1,323		3.8%
2000	1,432		8.2%
2010	1,773		23.8%
2020	1,690		−4.7%
2023 (est.)	1,671	▼	−1.1%
U.S. Decennial Census

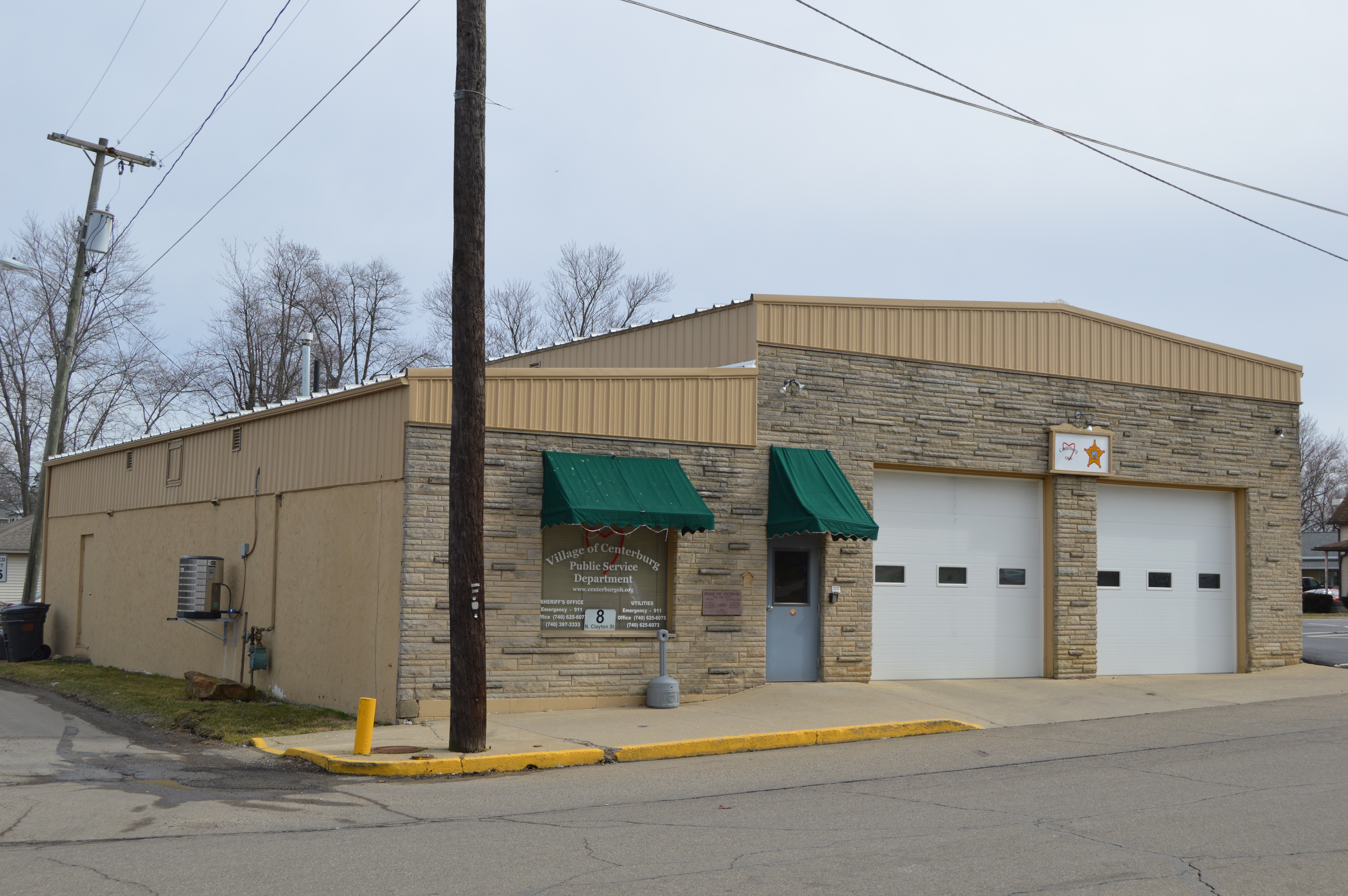
Village Building

=== 2010 census ===
As of the census of 2010, there were 1,773 people, 622 households, and 431 families living in the village. The population density was 1,970.0 inhabitants per square mile (760.6/km^{2}). There were 679 housing units at an average density of 754.4 per square mile (291.3/km^{2}). The racial makeup of the village was 96.9% White, 1.2% African American, 0.1% Native American, 0.3% Asian, 0.1% from other races, and 1.4% from two or more races. Hispanic or Latino of any race were 0.2% of the population.

There were 622 households, of which 42.6% had children under the age of 18 living with them, 46.9% were married couples living together, 16.7% had a female householder with no husband present, 5.6% had a male householder with no wife present, and 30.7% were non-families. 26.4% of all households were made up of individuals, and 12.1% had someone living alone who was 65 years of age or older. The average household size was 2.63 and the average family size was 3.19.

The median age in the village was 36.2 years. 28.5% of residents were under the age of 18; 8.5% were between the ages of 18 and 24; 26% were from 25 to 44; 22.6% were from 45 to 64; and 14.3% were 65 years of age or older. The gender makeup of the village was 47.3% male and 52.7% female.

=== 2000 census ===
As of the census of 2000, there were 1,432 people, 504 households, and 363 families living in the village. The population density was 2,228.5 inhabitants per square mile (860.4/km^{2}). There were 537 housing units at an average density of 835.7 per square mile (322.7/km^{2}). The racial makeup of the village was 97.91% White, 0.49% African American, 0.35% Native American, 0.28% Asian, 0.07% from other races, and 0.91% from two or more races. Hispanic or Latino of any race were 0.07% of the population.

There were 504 households, out of which 42.7% had children under the age of 18 living with them, 57.1% were married couples living together, 11.5% had a female householder with no husband present, and 27.8% were non-families. 25.6% of all households were made up of individuals, and 11.7% had someone living alone who was 65 years of age or older. The average household size was 2.63 and the average family size was 3.16.

In the village, the population was spread out, with 29.3% under the age of 18, 6.6% from 18 to 24, 30.4% from 25 to 44, 17.6% from 45 to 64, and 16.0% who were 65 years of age or older. The median age was 35 years. For every 100 females there were 100.0 males. For every 100 females age 18 and over, there were 90.2 males.

The median income for a household in the village was $39,750, and the median income for a family was $46,250. Males had a median income of $34,097 versus $27,353 for females. The per capita income for the village was $16,764. About 3.6% of families and 5.6% of the population were below the poverty line, including 5.7% of those under age 18 and 6.3% of those age 65 or over.

== Notable people ==
- Doug Davis, Minnesota Vikings lineman in the 1960s
- Earl Griffith, newspaper publisher
- Daniel H. Reynolds, Confederate Brigadier General
