= Earl Griffith =

American politician

Harry Earl Griffith

39th Ohio Secretary of State
- In office January 9, 1939 – March 30, 1940
- Governor: John W. Bricker
- Preceded by: William J. Kennedy
- Succeeded by: George M. Neffiner

Personal details
- Born: July 13, 1887 Centerburg, Ohio, US
- Died: March 30, 1940 (aged 52) Columbus, Ohio, US
- Resting place: River Cliff Cemetery, Mount Gilead, Ohio, US
- Party: Republican
- Spouse: Mary Clara Terry
- Education: Ohio Wesleyan University

Harry Earl Griffith (July 13, 1887 – March 30, 1940) was a newspaper publisher who served as the Secretary of the State of Ohio from 1939 to 1940.

Griffith was born in Centerburg, Ohio, in Knox county. He was the son of Nellie Myrtle (Gunsaulus) and Harry Saiger Griffith. He attended Mount Gilead public schools. He attended Ohio Wesleyan University, Delaware, Ohio.

He married Mary Clara Terry on April 17, 1912. He was the publisher of the newspaper the Morrow County Sentinel, which he took over after the death of his father, Harry Saiger Griffith. The paper was started by his grandfather John W. Griffith in 1858. He served as the Post Master of Morrow County from 1928 to 1934. He was a prominent Republican in Morrow county and the state of Ohio. He served as an alternate delegate to Republican National Convention from Ohio in 1924. In 1936, he ran an unsuccessful bid for the Secretary of the State of Ohio. He ran again for the same post in 1938 and won. He served as the Secretary of the State of Ohio from 1939 until his death in 1940. Governor John W. Bricker appointed George Neffner to complete the rest of Griffith's term as Secretary of State.

Griffith died in Columbus, Ohio on March 30, 1940. He is buried at River Cliff Cemetery, Mount Gilead, Ohio.

Political offices
Preceded by William J. Kennedy	Secretary of State of Ohio; 1939–1940	Succeeded by George M. Neffiner
