= Charles Kinney =

American politician

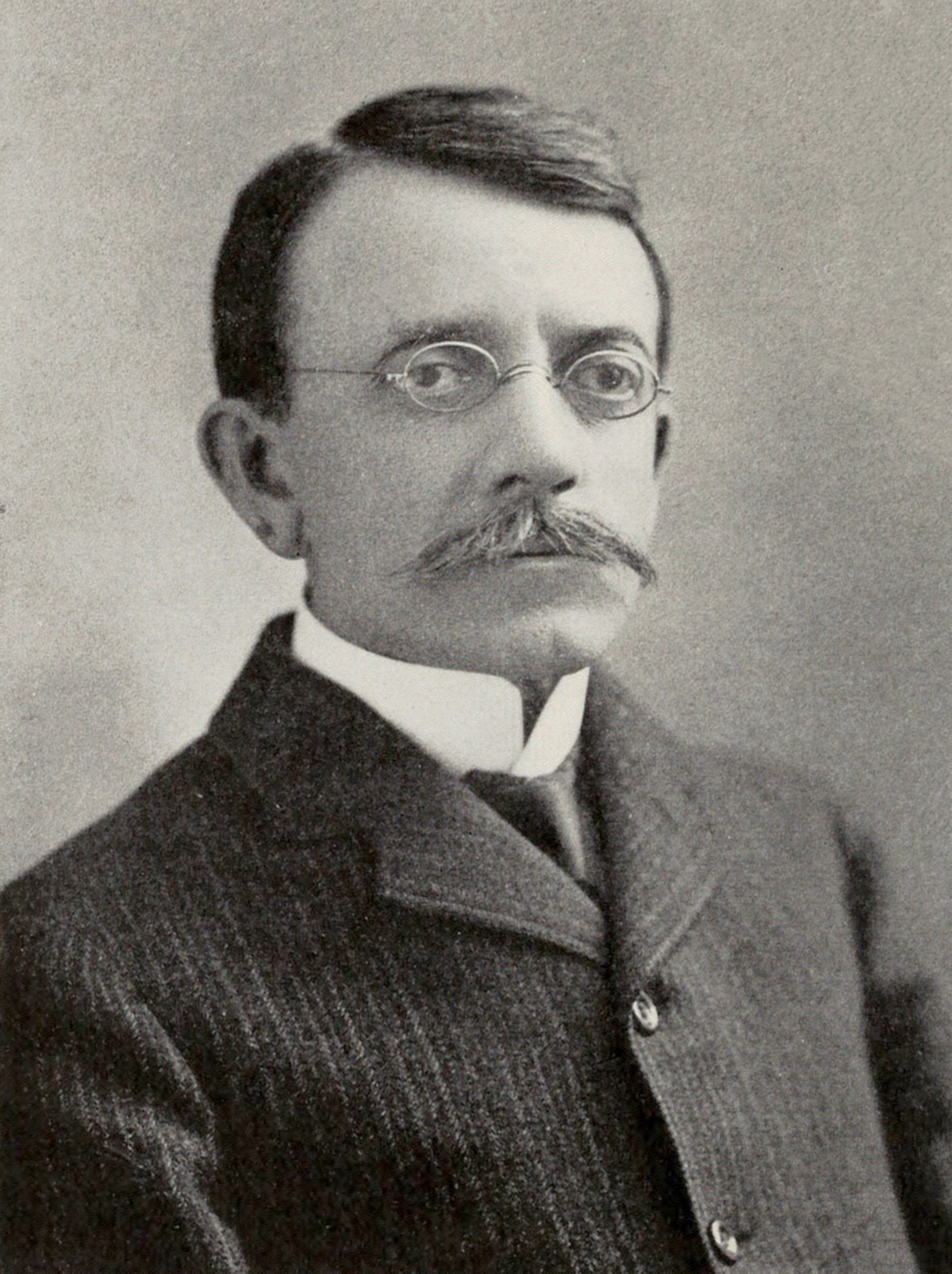

28th Ohio Secretary of State
- In office January 11, 1897 – January 14, 1901
- Governor: Asa S. Bushnell; George K. Nash
- Preceded by: Samuel McIntire Taylor
- Succeeded by: Lewis C. Laylin

Personal details
- Born: July 7, 1850 Springville, Kentucky (now South Portsmouth, Kentucky)
- Died: September 15, 1918 (aged 68)
- Party: Republican
- Spouse: Letitia H. Yoakley
- Children: one

Charles Kinney (July 7, 1850 – September 15, 1918) was a Republican politician who was Ohio Secretary of State from 1897 to 1901.

== Life and career ==
Kinney was born July 7, 1850, in Springville, Kentucky. When his father died in 1861, he moved to Columbus, Indiana, with his mother and brother, where he stayed until 1872. He graduated from high school there in 1866. He practiced the printer's trade until moving to Portsmouth, Ohio, in 1872. He was in mercantile for four years, until taking up printing again. He was then appointed Deputy Treasurer of Scioto County, Ohio, in 1877, serving until 1880. He was elected County Treasurer in 1883, and served four years. He served as chief clerk under Secretaries of State Ryan and Taylor, and was elected as Secretary of State in 1896, and re-elected in 1898.

After his second term ended, Kinney engaged in corporate law in Columbus.

Kinney died September 15, 1918.

Kinney was married October 8, 1879, to Letitia H. Yoakley of Portsmouth. They had a daughter named Lida.

== Publications ==
- Kinney, Charles (1911). Vagrant Verse. Columbus: F. J. Heer. - a book of poetry

Political offices
Preceded by Samuel M. Taylor	Secretary of State of Ohio; 1897–1901	Succeeded by Lewis C. Laylin
