= Thomas E. Scroggy =

American politician

Thomas Edmund Scroggy
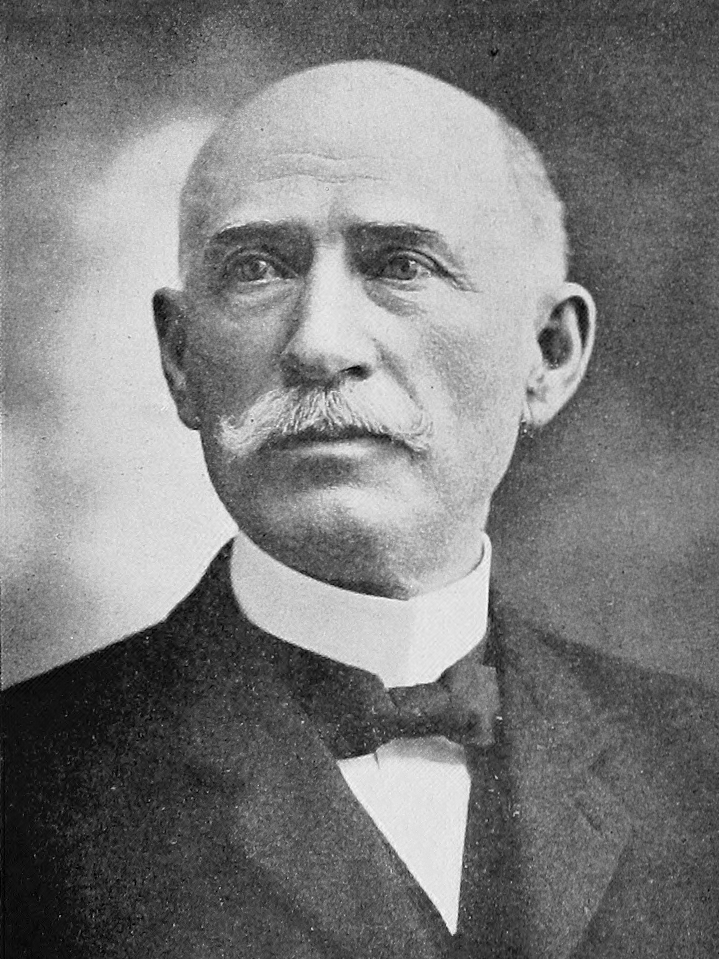

Member of the U.S. House of Representatives from Ohio's 6th district
- In office March 4, 1905 – March 3, 1907
- Preceded by: Charles Q. Hildebrant
- Succeeded by: Matthew Denver

Personal details
- Born: March 18, 1843 Harveysburg, Ohio, U.S.
- Died: March 6, 1915 (aged 71) Tulsa, Oklahoma, U.S.
- Party: Republican

Thomas Edmund Scroggy (March 18, 1843 – March 6, 1915) was Civil War veteran who served one term as a U.S. representative from Ohio from 1905 to 1907.

== Early life and career ==
Born in Harveysburg, Ohio, Scroggy attended the public schools. He engaged in manufacturing.

=== Civil War ===
Enlisted in July 1861 as a private in Company H, Thirty-ninth Regiment, Ohio Volunteer Infantry, and served in that capacity and a corporal. Honorably discharged and mustered out at Camp Dennison in March 1865.

=== Legal career ===
In June 1865 Scroggy engaged in the retail business in Xenia, Ohio. He was elected Justice of the Peace in 1869 and served one term. He studied law. He was admitted to the bar September 8, 1871, and commenced practice in Xenia, Ohio.

He served three terms as clerk and three terms as solicitor of the city of Xenia. Common Pleas Judge in 1898, and again elected for a term of five years beginning February 1904 from which he resigned upon his election to Congress.

== Congress ==
Scroggy was elected as a Republican to the Fifty-ninth Congress (March 4, 1905 – March 3, 1907). He was not a candidate for renomination in 1906.

== Later career and death ==
He resumed the practice of his profession. He moved to Tulsa, Oklahoma, in 1912, where he died March 6, 1915. He was interred in Woodlawn Cemetery, Xenia, Ohio.

U.S. House of Representatives
Preceded by Charles Q. Hildebrant	Member of the U.S. House of Representatives from Ohio's 6th congressional district 1905–1907	Succeeded by Matthew Denver
