= Christian L. Poorman =

American politician

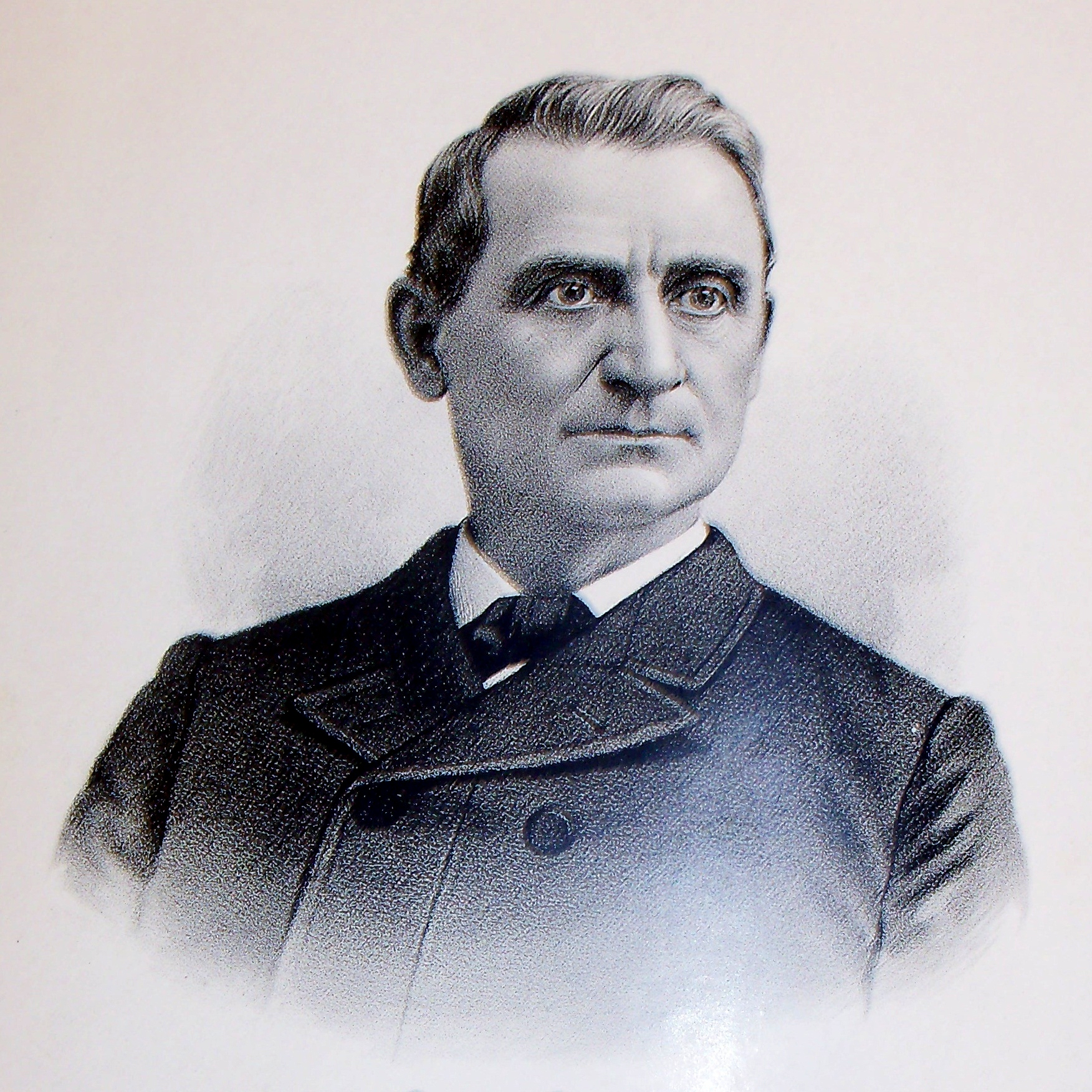

26th Ohio Secretary of State
- In office April 1891 – January 9, 1893
- Appointed by: James E. Campbell
- Preceded by: Daniel J. Ryan
- Succeeded by: Samuel McIntire Taylor

Member of the Ohio House of Representatives from the Belmont County district
- In office January 4, 1886 – January 5, 1890 Serving with Samuel Hilles; Alexander T. McKelvey
- Preceded by: Samuel Hilles
- Succeeded by: Alexander T. McKelvey

Personal details
- Born: October 28, 1825 Mechanicsburg, Pennsylvania, US
- Died: March 6, 1912 (aged 86) Shadyside, Ohio, US
- Party: Republican
- Spouse: Martha Ann Ebert
- Education: Cincinnati Law School
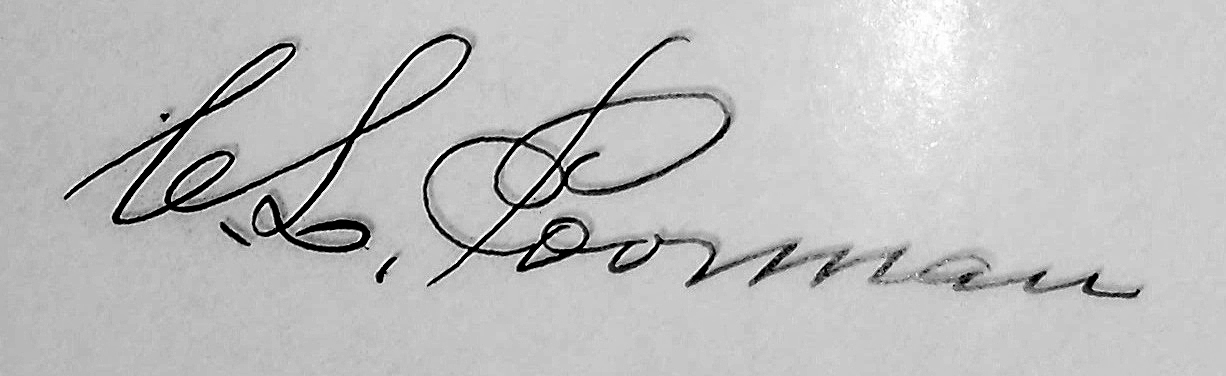
- Signature

Military service
- Allegiance: United States
- Branch/service: Union Army
- Years of service: 1861 – 1863
- Rank: Lieutenant colonel
- Unit: 43rd Ohio Infantry; 98th Ohio Infantry
- Battles/wars: American Civil War

Christian L. Poorman (October 28, 1825 – March 6, 1912) was an American politician, Union Army officer and businessman who served as the 26th Ohio secretary of state from 1892 to 1893 and in the Ohio House of Representatives.

== Biography ==
Christian L. Poorman was born in Mechanicsburg, Pennsylvania October 28, 1825, the son of Christian and Elizabeth (Longdorf) Poorman. His father died in 1840 from the effects of a wound received in the War of 1812. He attended the common schools and learned cabinet and chair making trades. He worked at these to afford law school. He entered the Cincinnati Law School in 1853, and graduated in 1855, establishing a large clientage at St. Clairsville, Ohio. Politically, he was a Whig, and became a Republican and strongly supported Abraham Lincoln when he edited the Belmont Chronicle. He continued with the Chronicle until 1870, except when away as a soldier.

Poorman raised a company, and was commissioned captain of Company D, 43rd Ohio Infantry, December 21, 1861 - August 12, 1862. For gallantry in the field, he was commissioned lieutenant colonel, and assigned to 98th Ohio Infantry, participated in battles in Kentucky and Tennessee, and resigned September 12, 1863.

After selling the Chronicle in 1870, Poorman manufactured machinery in Bellaire, Ohio. He was issued U.S. patent 115,099 in 1871. The Panic of 1873 wiped out his fortune. The Democrats nominated him for Ohio's 16th Congressional District in 1872, but he lost to Republican Lorenzo Danford.

In 1878, Poorman established the Bellaire Tribune, and strongly advocated protective tariffs. He was first elected justice of the peace in Belmont County, Ohio, and then elected county auditor for two terms starting in 1859. He was elected and re-elected in 1885 and 1887 to the Ohio House of Representatives, serving 1886–1889 in the 67th and 68th General Assemblies. In April, 1891, Daniel J. Ryan resigned as Ohio Secretary of State to take another position, and Governor James E. Campbell appointed Poorman to fill the position. He was not re-nominated for the 1892 election.

In 1890, Poorman was nominated by the Republicans for the 17th congressional district, but lost 51.2% - 48.8%. In 1892, Poorman was nominated by the Republicans for the 16th congressional district, but lost 50.06% - 49.94%. Both times the winning Democratic nominee was Albert J. Pearson.

On April 6, 1846, Poorman married Martha Ann Ebert.
