= Lewis C. Laylin =

American politician (1848–1923)

Lewis Cass Laylin
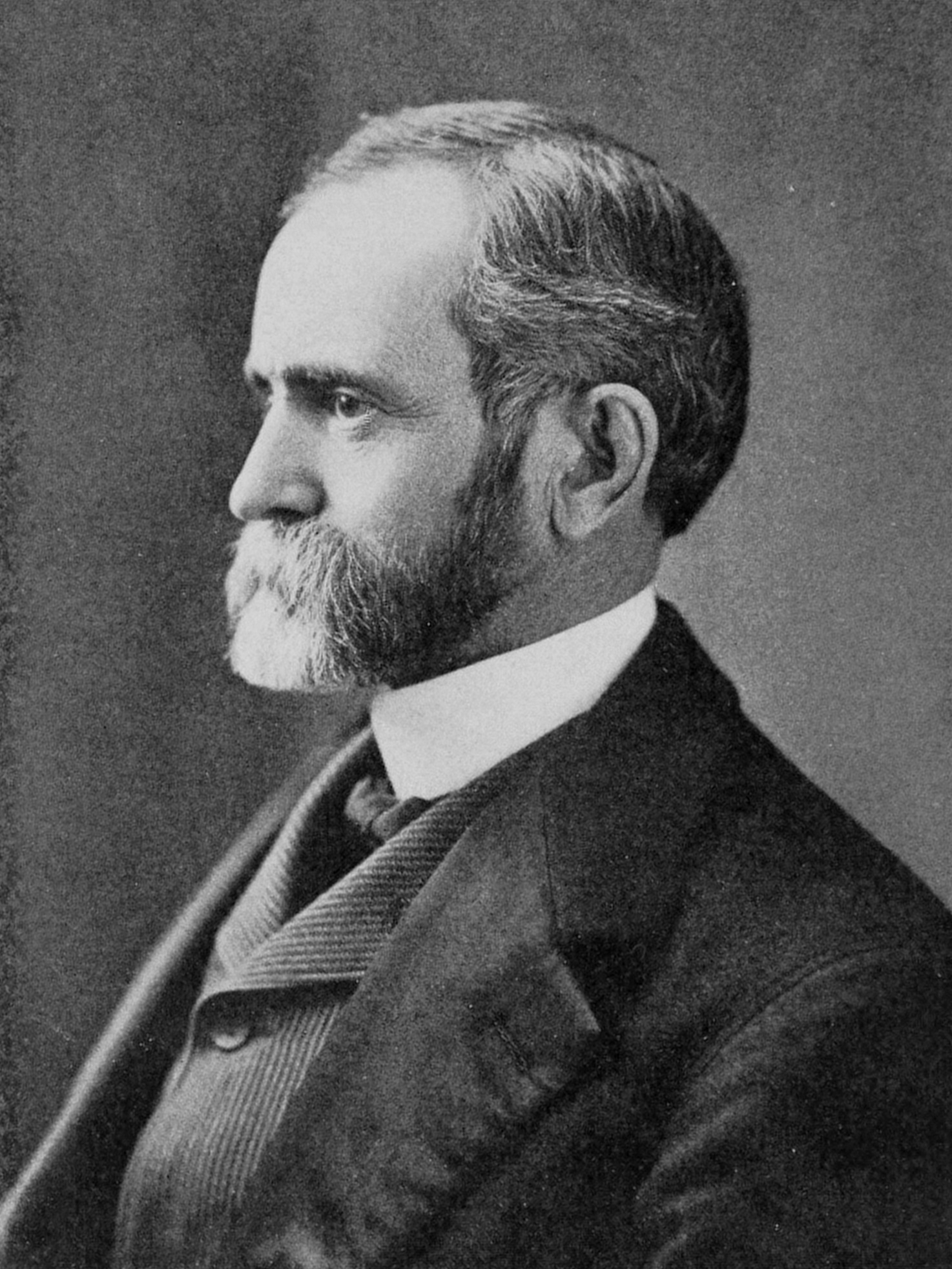

29th Ohio Secretary of State
- In office January 14, 1901 – January 14, 1907
- Governor: George K. Nash; Myron T. Herrick
- Preceded by: Charles Kinney
- Succeeded by: Carmi Thompson

Personal details
- Born: September 28, 1848 Norwalk, Ohio, US
- Died: November 17, 1923 (aged 75) Norwalk, Ohio, US
- Resting place: Woodlawn Cemetery
- Party: Republican
- Spouse: Frances L. Dewey
- Children: three

Lewis Cass Laylin (28 September 1848 – 17 November 1923) was a Republican politician who was in the Ohio House of Representatives, and was Ohio Secretary of State from 1901 to 1907.

== Early life ==
Laylin was born September 28, 1848, in Norwalk, Ohio. He graduated from Norwalk High School in 1867. In 1869, he was elected superintendent of the Bellevue public schools. He began study of law, and was admitted to the bar March 13, 1876.

== Biography ==
Laylin was city clerk of Norwalk two years, a member of the Huron County board of school examiners twelve years, and president of the Norwalk City board of examiners three years. He was elected prosecuting attorney of Huron County in 1879, and served for seven years.

Laylin represented Huron County in the Ohio House of representatives from 1888 to 1893, in the 68th, 69th and 70th General Assemblies, selected by his peers as Speaker of the House in the 70th in 1892–1893.

Laylin was nominated in 1900 by the Republican Party for Ohio secretary of state, and re-elected twice, serving a total of six years from 1901 to 1907.

Married November 3, 1880, to Frances L Dewey of Norwalk, and had three sons. He was a Mason. He died November 17, 1923.

== Notes ==
Political offices
Preceded by Charles Kinney	Ohio Secretary of State; 1901-1907	Succeeded by Carmi Thompson
Ohio House of Representatives
Preceded by Watson D. Johnston	Representative from Huron County; 1888-1893	Succeeded by David H. Reed
Preceded by Nial R. Hysell	Speaker of the House; 1892-1893	Succeeded by Alexander Boxwell
