= Henry Clay Smith =

German-American architect

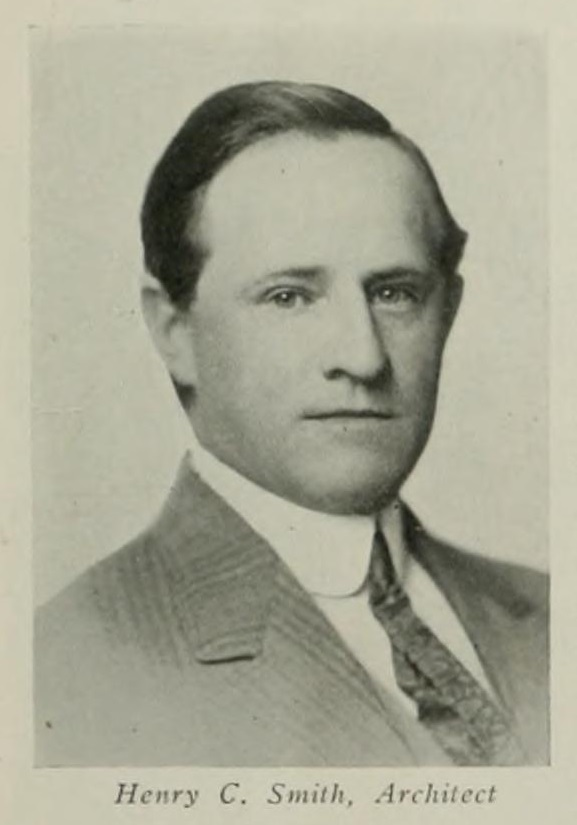
Henry Clay Smith as depicted in The Architect and engineer of California and the Pacific Coast (1916)

Henry Clay Smith (February 7, 1874 – December 10, 1945) was an American architect.

Smith was born in Santa Clara, California, one of 12 children born to German immigrants Charles Christian Smith (1838-1927) and Maria Pfieffer (1845-1916). Charles, a co-founder, with his brother of the town of Evergreen, California, now part of San Jose, was a blacksmith, who found success in real estate (Smith Phelps Realty) and lumber (President of Union Mill and Lumber, Co.)

He studied at the University of Pennsylvania, where he was mentored by James Hamilton Windrim (1840-1919). Upon graduation, Smith spent four years working with the firm of James H. Windrim & Son (John Torrey Windrim, 1866-1934), returning to the San Francisco bay area to set up practice with a partner, Louis S. Stone, in 1900. The partners specialized in schools, apartments and houses until they dissolved their partnership in 1909. He subsequently practiced solo, continuing the development of a signature talent in the siting of buildings on San Francisco's hilly terrain, and became known as "The Hillside Architect." Smith was adept at many architectural styles; there are fine examples in Spanish, Mission and Tudor Revival, Italian Renaissance and Neo-Classicism, often informed with an Arts and Crafts sensibility. He was awarded the Jury Prize "for schoolhouse architecture" at the 1915 Panama–Pacific International Exposition.

Smith was married in Philadelphia on April 25, 1900, to Lillian Troth. They had a son, John Windrim Smith, and a daughter, Elizabeth Clay Smith. They made a home in Los Gatos, California, "Far Hills," where Smith could indulge his artistic imagination and love of landscape architecture.

Henry Clay Smith died on December 10, 1945, resident in his Cloister Apartments in San Francisco.
