= Charles H. Graves (Ohio politician) =

American politician (1872–1940)

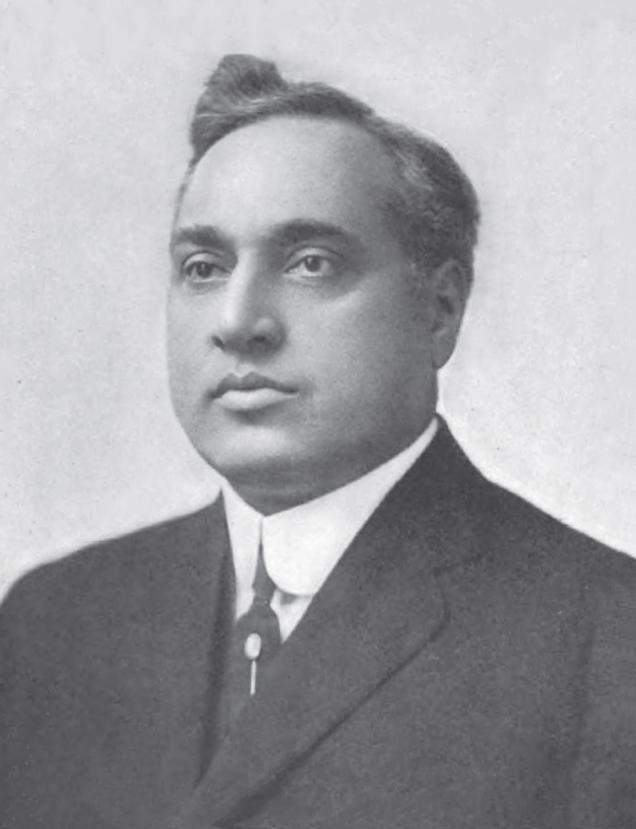

31st Ohio Secretary of State
- In office January 9, 1911 – January 11, 1915
- Governor: Judson Harmon; James M. Cox
- Preceded by: Carmi Thompson
- Succeeded by: Charles Quinn Hildebrant

Personal details
- Born: Charles Henry Graves; June 24, 1872 Clay Township, Ottawa County, Ohio
- Died: August 15, 1940 (aged 68) Toledo, Ohio
- Resting place: Oak Harbor Cemetery
- Party: Democratic
- Spouse: Emma B. Mylander
- Children: two
- Education: University of Michigan Law School

Charles Henry Graves (June 24, 1872 – August 15, 1940) was a Democratic politician in the U.S. state of Ohio who was Ohio Secretary of State 1911–1915.

== Biography ==
Charles H. Graves was born in Ottawa County, Ohio. His father was born in Germany. Graves attended the public schools of Oak Harbor, Ohio, and the University of Michigan Law School, where he graduated in 1893. He had previously studied law in Oak Harbor. He was admitted to the bar in 1893 at Columbus, Ohio.

Graves married Emma B. Mylander of Oak Harbor on September 2, 1896, and had two sons. He served as city solicitor of Oak Harbor, and as Prosecuting Attorney of Ottawa County, Ohio, elected to three year terms in 1900 and 1903. In 1909 he was chairman of the Ottawa County Democratic Central and Executive Committees.

Graves was elected on the Democratic ticket as Secretary of State in 1910, and re-elected in 1912.

Graves died following surgery in August 1940.

Political offices
| Preceded by Carmi Thompson | Secretary of State of Ohio; 1911–1915 | Succeeded by Charles Q. Hildebrant |
