= Thad H. Brown =

American lawyer and politician

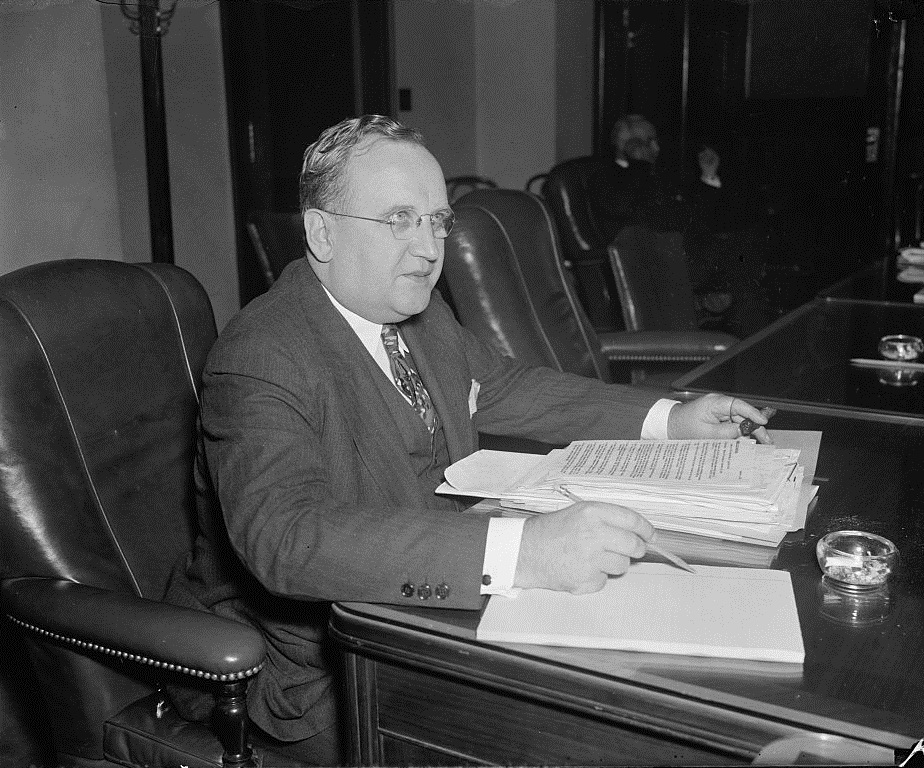
- Brown in Washington, D.C., 1937

Member of the Federal Communications Commission
- In office July 11, 1934 – June 30, 1940
- President: Franklin D. Roosevelt
- Preceded by: Office established
- Succeeded by: Ray C. Wakefield

Member of the Federal Radio Commission
- In office March 28, 1932 – July 11, 1934
- President: Herbert Hoover; Franklin D. Roosevelt
- Preceded by: Ira E. Robinson
- Succeeded by: Office eliminated

35th Ohio Secretary of State
- In office January 8, 1923 – January 10, 1927
- Governor: A. Victor Donahey
- Preceded by: Harvey C. Smith
- Succeeded by: Clarence J. Brown

Personal details
- Born: January 10, 1887 Cardington, Ohio
- Died: February 25, 1941 (aged 54) Cleveland, Ohio
- Resting place: Arlington National Cemetery
- Party: Republican
- Spouse: Marie Thraillkill

Military service
- Allegiance: United States
- Branch/service: United States Army
- Battles/wars: World War I

Thaddeus Harold Brown (January 10, 1887 – February 25, 1941) was a Republican lawyer and politician from the U.S. State of Ohio. After serving in the United States Army during World War I, he was elected Ohio Secretary of State 1923–1927, and was a commissioner of the Federal Radio Commission and then the Federal Communications Commission from 1932 to 1940.

== Biography ==
Brown was born January 10, 1887, at Cardington, Morrow County, Ohio, son of William Henry Brown and Ella Dell (Monroe) Brown. He was married November 10, 1915, to Marie Thrailkill.

During World War I, Brown joined the United States Army and was Captain of Quartermaster Corps from July 13, 1917, and from October 11, 1918, until his discharge was Captain, Judge Advocate General's Corps at Fort Sam Houston, Texas.

In 1920, Brown was post Commander of American Legion in Columbus, Ohio. He was elected Ohio Secretary of State in 1922 and 1924, serving 1923–1927.

Brown was an unsuccessful candidate in the Republican primary for Ohio Governor in 1926, a delegate to the 1928 Republican National Convention, and a Presidential elector in 1928.

March 28, 1932, Brown was appointed to the Federal Radio Commission, and served until being appointed to the successor agency. On July 11, 1934, he was appointed a Commissioner to the newly formed Federal Communications Commission and served until June 30, 1940.

Brown died in Cleveland, Ohio, February 25, 1941, and was buried in Arlington National Cemetery. He was a Presbyterian, Mason, Phi Kappa Psi, Phi Delta Phi, and Shriner.

Political offices
Preceded by Harvey C. Smith	Secretary of State of Ohio; 1923–1927	Succeeded by Clarence J. Brown
