= William W. Armstrong (journalist) =

American journalist and politician

William Wallace Armstrong

15th Ohio Secretary of State
- In office January 12, 1863 – January 9, 1865
- Governor: David Tod; John Brough
- Preceded by: Wilson S. Kennon
- Succeeded by: William Henry Smith

Personal details
- Born: March 18, 1833 New Lisbon, Ohio, US
- Died: April 21, 1905 (aged 72) Cleveland, Ohio, US
- Resting place: Greenlawn Cemetery, Tiffin, Ohio, US
- Party: Democratic
- Spouse: Sarah Virginia Hedges
- Children: three
- Occupation: newspaper editor

William Wallace Armstrong (March 18, 1833 – April 21, 1905) was an American journalist and politician born in Columbiana County, Ohio. He served as a Democratic Ohio Secretary of State from 1863 to 1865 and was later publisher of The Plain Dealer and postmaster of Cleveland.

== Biography ==
William W. Armstrong was born at New Lisbon, Columbiana County, Ohio, and lived there until moving to Tiffin, Seneca County, Ohio, in 1847 where he apprenticed at the Seneca Advertiser, learning the printing trade. He became editor, and bought the paper in 1854. From 1857 to 1861 he was postmaster of Tiffin.

In 1862, the Democratic state convention nominated Armstrong for Secretary of State, and he was elected later that year over incumbent Republican Wilson S. Kennon. He served one two-year term, but lost in a landslide to Republican William Henry Smith in 1864. He was the youngest man ever to hold the office.

After his term expired in 1865, Armstrong moved to Cleveland, bought The Plain Dealer, and edited it until 1883. On April 17, 1868, he testified at the impeachment trial of President Andrew Johnson, having been called as a witness by the defense, testifying about Johnson's Swing Around the Circle speech in Cleveland that Armstrong had covered as a reporter, with the defense aiming to prove that Johnson was constantly interrupted by the crowd during that speech and that many disorderly individuals were in the audience.

Armstrong was a delegate to the Democratic National Conventions in 1868, 1880, and 1884.

In 1881, Armstrong declined the nomination for governor. From 1887 to 1891, Armstrong was postmaster of Cleveland. In 1895 he was a candidate for Cleveland City Treasurer.

Armstrong died April 21, 1905, at his home in Cleveland, and was buried in Tiffin, at Greenlawn Cemetery.

Armstrong married Sarah Virginia Hedges on November 10, 1857. They had three children: two sons who died in infancy and Isabella Hedges, born 1864.

== Notes ==
Political offices
Preceded by Wilson S. Kennon	Secretary of State of Ohio; 1863–1865	Succeeded by William Henry Smith
