= William D. Fulton =

American politician (1864–1925)

William Duane Fulton
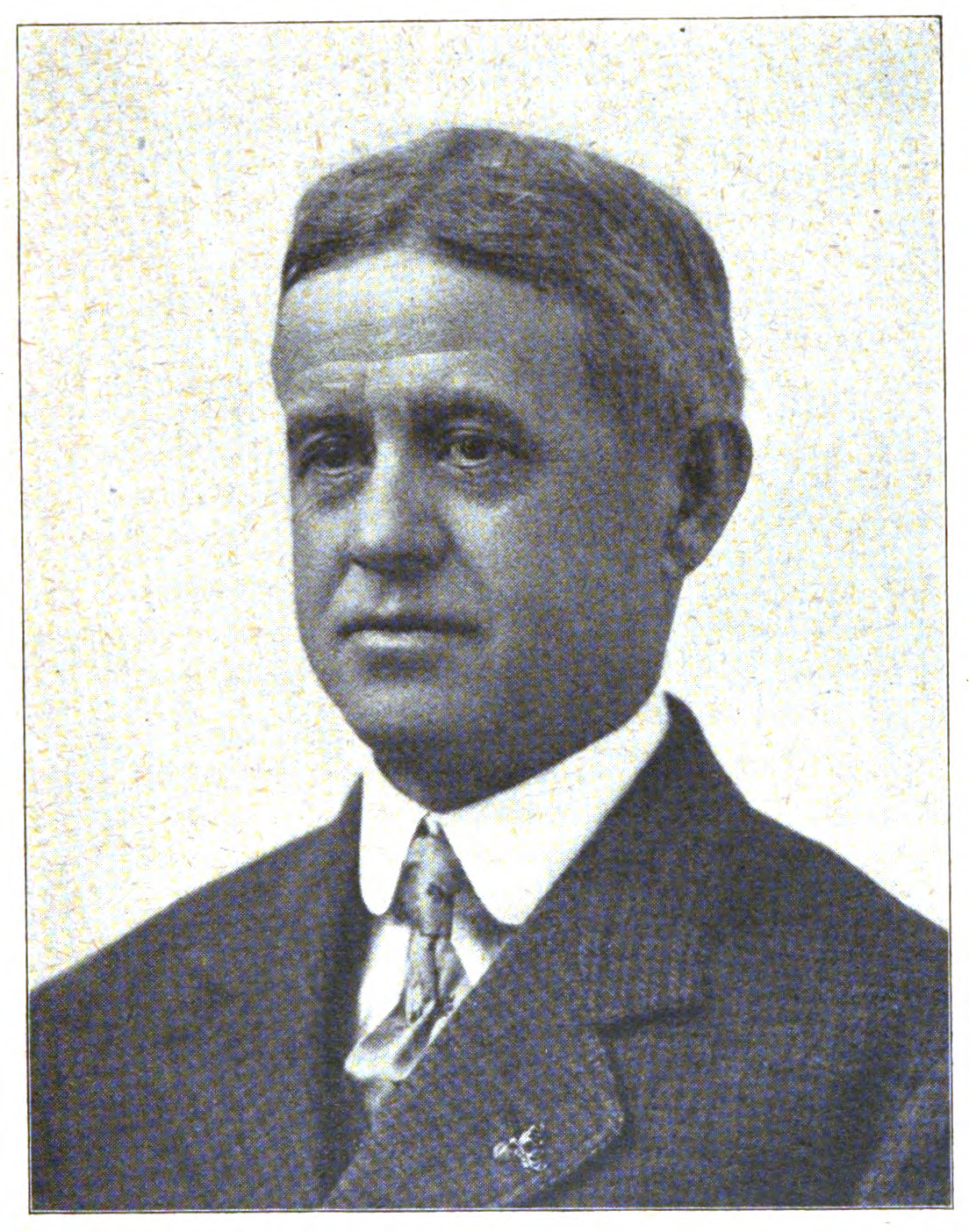

33rd Ohio Secretary of State
- In office January 8, 1917 – January 13, 1919
- Governor: James M. Cox
- Preceded by: Charles Q. Hildebrant
- Succeeded by: Harvey C. Smith

Member of the Ohio House of Representatives from the Licking County district
- In office January 2, 1911 – January 3, 1915
- Preceded by: Robert W. Howard
- Succeeded by: John S. Graham

Personal details
- Born: May 27, 1864 Homer, Ohio, US
- Died: March 2, 1925 (aged 60) Mount Clemens, Michigan, US
- Party: Democratic
- Spouse: Josephine Wintermuth
- Children: four
- Education: Denison University

William Duane Fulton (May 27, 1864 – March 2, 1925) was a Democratic politician in the U.S. state of Ohio who served in the Ohio House of Representatives and was Ohio Secretary of State 1917–1919.

== Biography ==
William Duane Fulton was born in Homer, Ohio, in 1864. He attended public schools, and graduated from Denison University, Granville, Ohio. He then read law and after admission to the bar, he practiced in Newark, Ohio. He was city solicitor, and member of council.

Fulton was elected as a Democrat to the Ohio House of Representatives to the 79th (1911–1912) and 80th (1913–1914) General Assemblies. In the 80th Assembly, he authored the bill that Gerrymandered the state's Congressional districts.

In 1916, Fulton was elected Ohio Secretary of State, and served 1917–1919.

Fulton married Josephine W. Wintermuth of Newark. They had three daughters and a son.

Fulton died March 1925 in Mount Clemens, Michigan.
