= Samuel McIntire Taylor =

American politician

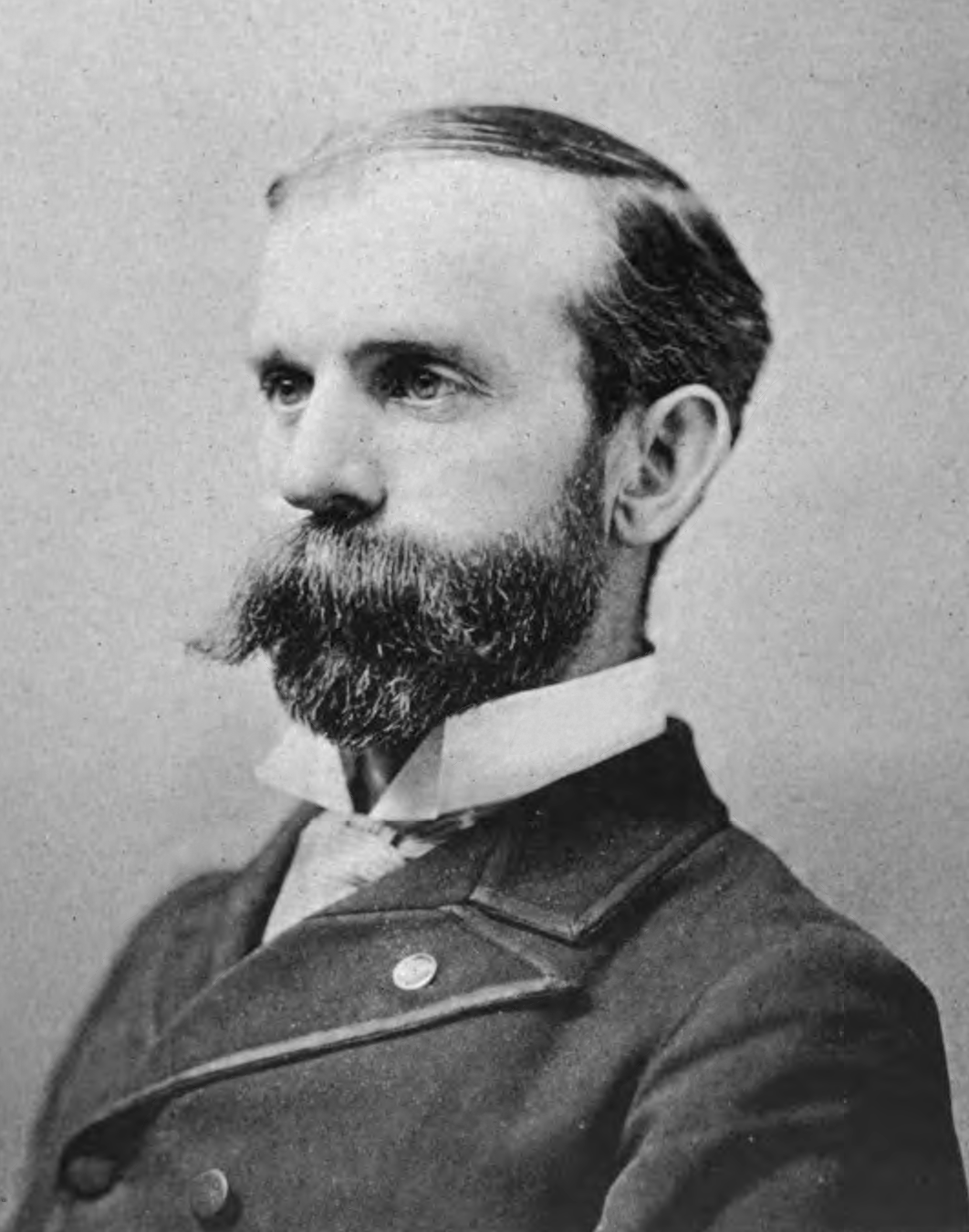

27th Ohio Secretary of State
- In office January 9, 1893 – January 11, 1897
- Governor: William McKinley; Asa S. Bushnell
- Preceded by: Christian L. Poorman
- Succeeded by: Charles Kinney

Member of the Ohio House of Representatives from the Champaign County district
- In office January 2, 1888 – January 8, 1893
- Preceded by: Thomas E. Cowgill
- Succeeded by: Thomas E. Hunter

Personal details
- Born: July 24, 1856 Champaign County, Ohio, US
- Died: December 7, 1916 (aged 60) Birmingham, England
- Resting place: Oak Dale Cemetery, Urbana, Ohio
- Party: Republican
- Education: Ohio Wesleyan University; Cincinnati Law School

Samuel McIntire Taylor was a Republican politician in the Ohio House of Representatives and Ohio Secretary of State from 1893 to 1897.

== Early life ==
Samuel Taylor was born July 24, 1856, in Champaign County, Ohio. He attended country schools and graduated from Ohio Wesleyan University in 1882, where he was Phi Gamma Delta, and the Cincinnati Law School, where he graduated in 1884.

== Career ==
Taylor moved to Urbana, Ohio, where he practiced. He was elected in 1887 to represent Champaign County in the 68th General Assembly and re-elected 1889 and 1891 to the 69th and 70th, from which he resigned. He resigned when elected in 1892 to Ohio Secretary of State and then was re-elected in 1894.

After leaving office in 1897, Taylor was appointed consul to Glasgow, Scotland, by President McKinley. He was transferred to Callao, Peru in 1906, and served there until 1910. He was appointed consul to Birmingham, England, in 1913.

== Personal life ==
Taylor died from influenza in Birmingham, England on December 7, 1916. He was buried at Oak Dale Cemetery in Urbana.

Political offices
Preceded by Christian L. Poorman	Secretary of State of Ohio; 1897–1901	Succeeded by Charles Kinney
