= Benjamin S. Cowen =

American politician (1793–1869)

Benjamin Sprague Cowen

Member of the U.S. House of Representatives from Ohio's 11th district
- In office March 4, 1841 – March 4, 1843
- Preceded by: Isaac Parrish
- Succeeded by: Jacob Brinkerhoff

Member of the Ohio House of Representatives from the Belmont County district
- In office December 2, 1844 – December 6, 1846 Serving with Peter Tallman
- Preceded by: Samuel Dunn, William R. Carle
- Succeeded by: J. C. Kerr, M. Hogue

Personal details
- Born: September 27, 1793 Washington County, New York, U.S.
- Died: September 27, 1869 (aged 76) St. Clairsville, Ohio, U.S.
- Party: Whig
- Spouse: Anne Wood
- Children: Benjamin R. Cowen

Benjamin Sprague Cowen (September 27, 1793 – September 27, 1869) was a U.S. representative from Ohio.

== Life ==
Born in Washington County, New York, Cowen attended the common schools, and later studied medicine. He served in the War of 1812 as a private. In 1820, he moved to Moorefield Township, Harrison County, Ohio, where he practiced medicine and studied law. He was admitted to the bar in 1829 and commenced practice in St. Clairsville, Ohio. He edited the Belmont Chronicle 1836–1840, and served as delegate to the Whig National Convention at Harrisburg, Pennsylvania, in 1839.

Cowen was elected as a Whig to the Twenty-seventh Congress (March 4, 1841 – March 4, 1843). He served as a member of the Ohio House of Representatives in 1845 and 1846, and as presiding judge of the Court of Common Pleas in 1847.

In 1854, he was on the nominating committee of the Republican Party, representing Belmont County.

He died in St. Clairsville, Belmont County, Ohio, September 27, 1869. His obituary was published in the September 30, 1869 edition of the Belmont Chronicle.

== Family ==
Cowen was married to Anne Wood (1794–1865) of Washington County, New York in 1820.

He was the father of American Civil War Union Army General Benjamin Rush Cowen.

== Notes ==
U.S. House of Representatives
Preceded by Isaac Parrish	Member of the U.S. House of Representatives from Ohio's 11th congressional district 1841–1843	Succeeded by Jacob Brinkerhoff
