= Daniel J. Ryan =

American politician

Daniel Joseph Ryan
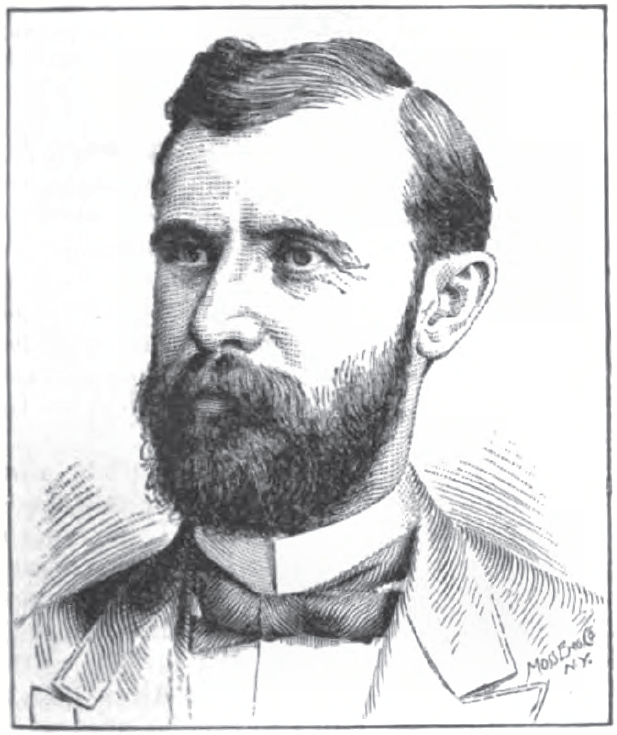
- Sketch by Henry Howe

25th Ohio Secretary of State
- In office January 1, 1889 – April 1891
- Governor: Joseph B. Foraker; James H. Campbell
- Preceded by: James S. Robinson
- Succeeded by: Christian L. Poorman

Member of the Ohio House of Representatives from the Scioto County district
- In office January 7, 1884 – January 1, 1888
- Preceded by: Daniel McFarland, Sr.
- Succeeded by: John C. Coates

Personal details
- Born: January 1, 1855 Cincinnati, Ohio, U.S.
- Died: June 15, 1923 (aged 68) Columbus, Ohio, U.S.
- Resting place: Green Lawn Cemetery
- Party: Republican
- Spouse: Myra L. Kerr
- Children: 5
- Occupation: historian, lawyer

Daniel Joseph Ryan (January 1, 1855 – June 15, 1923) was an American politician who served as the 25th Ohio Secretary of State from 1889 to 1892 and a member of the Ohio House of Representatives from 1884 to 1888 as a Republican. He was later an author.

== Biography ==
Daniel J. Ryan was born January, 1855 in Cincinnati, Ohio, where he lived till age seven when his family moved to Portsmouth, Ohio. His parents were John and Honora Ryan, natives of Ireland. He attended public schools and graduated from high school in 1875. In 1877 he was admitted to the bar. In April 1877, he was elected City Solicitor of Portsmouth, and re-elected in 1879. In 1883 Ryan was elected to the Ohio House of Representatives for the 66th General Assembly, and re-elected in 1885 for the 67th, where he was chosen Speaker pro tem. Ryan was elected Secretary of State in 1888, and re-elected in 1890. He resigned as Secretary of State April, 1891, to accept the office of Commissioner of the World's Fair for the State of Ohio.

Ryan was married to Myra L. Kerr of Portsmouth on January 10, 1884, had three children who died young, and two daughters who survived him. Secretary of State was his last elected office, and he devoted his later years to private practice and literary pursuits. Ryan served on the board of trustees of the Ohio Historical Society for thirty-four years.

Ryan died June 15, 1923. He was buried at Green Lawn Cemetery.

== Publications ==
- Ryan, Daniel J (1885). Arbitration between Capital and Labor. Columbus, Ohio: A H Smythe.
- Ryan, Daniel J (1888). A History of Ohio with Biographical Sketches of her Governors and the Ordinance of 1787. Columbus, Ohio: A H Smythe.
- Ryan, Daniel J (1911). The Civil War Literature of Ohio. Cleveland, Ohio: Burrows Brothers Company.
- History of Ohio volumes 1-5 : 1912, volume 6 : 1915 :
- Randall, Emilius; Ryan, Daniel Joseph (1912). History of Ohio: the Rise and Progress of an American State. Vol. 1. New York: The Century History Company.
- Volume 2, Volume 3, Volume 4, Volume 5, Volume 6
- Ryan, Daniel J (1917). Ohio in Four Wars. Columbus, O., The Heer press.
- Ryan, Daniel J. "Nullification in Ohio". Ohio Archaeological and Historical Publications. 2: 413–422.
- Ryan, Daniel J. "The Scioto Company and its Purchase". Ohio Archaeological and Historical Publications. 3: 109–141.
- Ryan, Daniel J. "The First Constitution: What Influenced its Adoption and its Influence on Ohio". Ohio Archaeological and Historical Publications. 12: 11–23. Archived from the original on 2004-03-12.
- Ryan, Daniel J. "Ohio in the Mexican War". Ohio Archaeological and Historical Publications. 21: 277–295.
- Ryan, Daniel J. "Lincoln and Ohio". Ohio Archaeological and Historical Publications. 32: 7–281. Archived from the original on 2004-01-05.

== Notes ==
Political offices
Preceded by James S. Robinson	Secretary of State of Ohio; 1889–1891	Succeeded by Christian L. Poorman
