= Charles Q. Hildebrant =

American politician

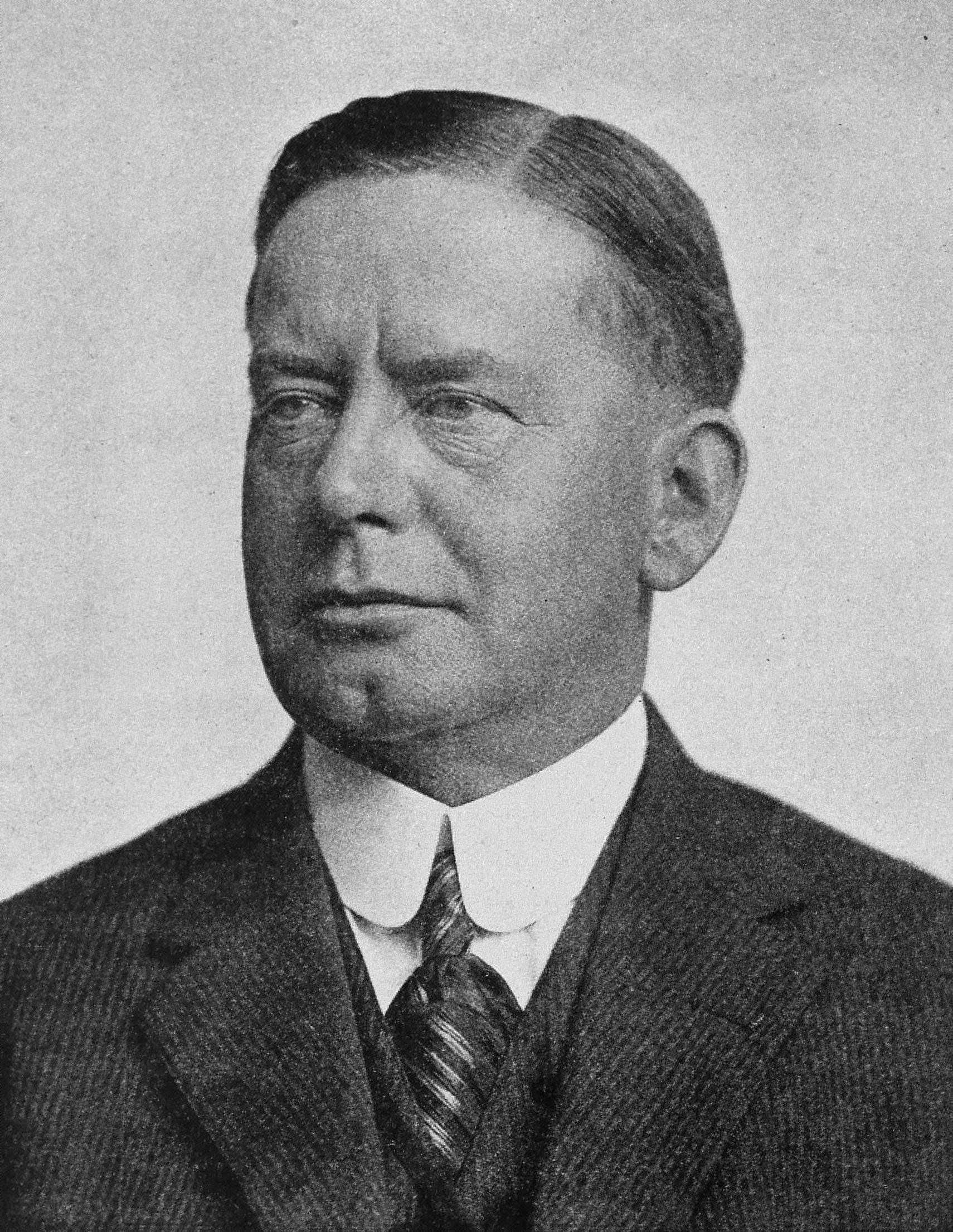

Member of the U.S. House of Representatives from Ohio's 6th district
- In office March 4, 1901 – March 3, 1905
- Preceded by: Seth W. Brown
- Succeeded by: Thomas E. Scroggy

32nd Ohio Secretary of State
- In office January 11, 1915 – January 8, 1917
- Governor: Frank B. Willis
- Preceded by: Charles H. Graves
- Succeeded by: William D. Fulton

Personal details
- Born: Charles Quinn Hildebrant; October 17, 1864 Wilmington, Ohio, U.S.
- Died: March 31, 1953 (aged 88) Wilmington, Ohio, U.S.
- Resting place: Sugar Grove Cemetery
- Party: Republican
- Education: Ohio State University

Charles Quinn Hildebrant (October 17, 1864 – March 31, 1953) was an American politician who served two terms as a U.S. representative from Ohio from 1901 to 1905.

== Biography ==
Born in Wilmington, Ohio, Hildebrant attended the public schools and Ohio State University at Columbus. He served as clerk of the court of Clinton County in 1890 and reelected in 1893 and 1896.

=== Congress ===
Hildebrant was elected as a Republican to the Fifty-seventh and Fifty-eighth Congresses (March 4, 1901 – March 3, 1905). He served as chairman of the Committee on Accounts (Fifty-eighth Congress). He was an unsuccessful candidate for reelection in 1904 to the Fifty-ninth Congress.

=== Later career ===
He resumed his business and agricultural pursuits. He served as delegate to the Republican National Convention in 1908. Secretary of state of Ohio 1915–1917.

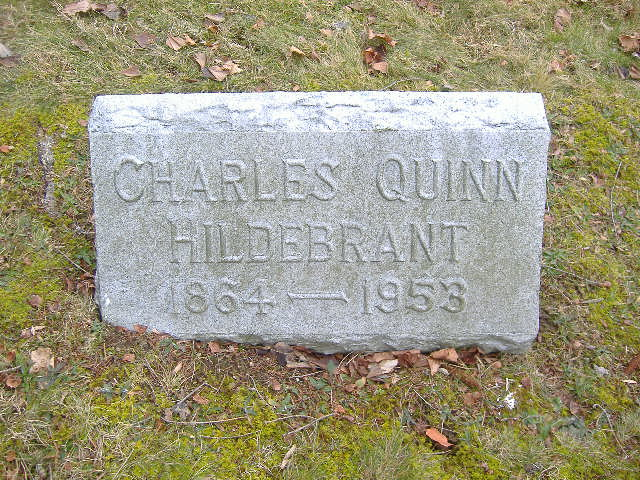
Gravestone of Charles Q. Hildebrant at Sugar Grove Cemetery in Wilmington, Ohio.

He served as mayor of Wilmington, Ohio, from November 1927 until his retirement December 31, 1941.

=== Death and burial ===
He died in Wilmington, Ohio, March 31, 1953. He was interred in Sugar Grove Cemetery.

== Sources ==
- Media related to Charles Q. Hildebrant at Wikimedia Commons
- United States Congress. "Charles Q. Hildebrant (id: H000585)". Biographical Directory of the United States Congress.

U.S. House of Representatives
Preceded by Seth W. Brown	Member of the U.S. House of Representatives from Ohio's 6th congressional district 1901–1905	Succeeded by Thomas E. Scroggy
Political offices
Preceded by Charles H. Graves	Secretary of State of Ohio; 1915–1917	Succeeded by William D. Fulton
