= Wilson S. Kennon =

American politician

Wilson Shannon Kennon

14th Ohio Secretary of State
- In office May 1862 – January 12, 1863
- Governor: David Tod
- Preceded by: Benjamin R. Cowen
- Succeeded by: William W. Armstrong

Personal details
- Born: May 15, 1826 St. Clairsville, Ohio
- Died: June 18, 1895 (aged 69) St. Clairsville, Ohio
- Party: Democratic; Union; Republican
- Education: Bethany College

Military service
- Allegiance: United States
- Branch/service: Union Army
- Rank: Major
- Battles/wars: American Civil War

Wilson Shannon Kennon (May 15, 1826 – June 18, 1895) was a Republican politician who was in the Ohio House of Representatives and was appointed Ohio Secretary of State from 1862 to 1863.

Wilson S. Kennon was son of William Kennon, Jr., who represented Ohio in the U.S. House of Representatives and sat on the Ohio Supreme Court. He was born in St. Clairsville, Ohio, where he continued to reside. He was educated at the "St. Clairsville Institute" and at Bethany College at Bethany, Virginia (now West Virginia). He studied law in his father's office, and was admitted to the bar in 1850.

In 1861, Wilson Kennon was elected to represent Belmont County, Ohio in the Ohio House of Representatives for the 55th General Assembly, convening January 6, 1862. Before the American Civil War, Kennon was a Democrat, but was nominated to the legislature by the Union Party of Belmont County. In May 1862, fellow Belmont Countian Benjamin Rush Cowen resigned as Secretary of State after a few months in office to go to war. Kennon was appointed to the office by Governor David Tod. Election of Secretary of State was then moved to even numbered years, and Kennon was nominated by the Republican Party on the second ballot for the 1862 election. In the General Election of 1862, Kennon lost to Democrat William W. Armstrong in an election where out of state soldiers were not allowed to vote.

After his term in office expired, Kennon became a Paymaster in the United States Army, and served throughout the American Civil War. He attained the rank of Major.

After the war, Kennon engaged in private practice of law at Cincinnati, in partnership with Milton Sayler and John W. Okey, for five years. He then moved back to Belmont County after his father's paralysis. He served as Belmont County Prosecuting Attorney for six years. Kennon died at his St. Clairsville home on June 18, 1895. At the time he was mayor of St. Clairsville.

== Notes ==
Ohio House of Representatives
Preceded by Isaac Welsh	Representative from Belmont County; January 6, 1862-May 1862	Succeeded by R. E. Chambers
Political offices
Preceded by Benjamin R. Cowen	Secretary of State of Ohio; 1862–1863	Succeeded by William W. Armstrong
