= Addison Peale Russell =

American politician (1826-1912)

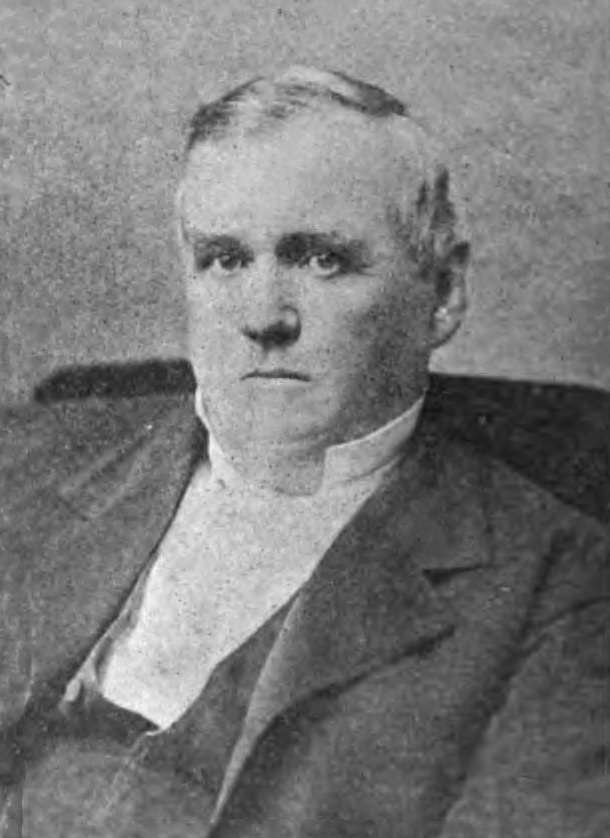

12th Ohio Secretary of State
- In office January 11, 1858 – January 13, 1862
- Governor: Salmon P. Chase; William Dennison
- Preceded by: James H. Baker
- Succeeded by: Benjamin R. Cowen

Member of the Ohio House of Representatives from the Clinton County district
- In office January 7, 1856 – January 3, 1858
- Preceded by: Thomas D. Austin
- Succeeded by: David P. Quinn

Personal details
- Born: September 8, 1826 Wilmington, Ohio
- Died: July 24, 1912 (aged 85)
- Party: Republican
- Occupation: author

Addison Peale Russell (September 8, 1826 – July 24, 1912) was an American author of the later nineteenth century. He is remembered mainly for his Sub-Coelum — "his best book...a Utopian protest against materialistic socialism."

Russell was born in Ohio; his formal education ended with grammar school. At the age of sixteen he took a job as a printer for a newspaper; by nineteen he had worked his way up to editor and publisher of the Hillsboro, Ohio News. He pursued a journalism career until he switched to politics and public service. He was made clerk of the Ohio Senate in 1850; he later represented Clinton County, Ohio in the Ohio House of Representatives in the 52nd General Assembly (1856–57) as a Republican, and was Ohio Secretary of State (1858–62). He was appointed Financial Agent for Ohio during the American Civil War, stationed in New York City. He retired from public office in 1868 to pursue literature. He wrote seven books:

- Half Tints (1867)
- Library Notes (1875)
- Thomas Corwin (1882)
- Characteristics (1884)
- A Club of One (1887)
- In a Club Corner (1890)
- Sub-Coelum (1893).

Apart from his biographical survey of Thomas Corwin, an Ohio governor, Russell's books generally fall into the category of belles-lettres.

Political offices
Preceded by James H. Baker	Secretary of State of Ohio; 1858–1862	Succeeded by Benjamin R. Cowen
