= Charles Townsend (Ohio politician) =

American politician

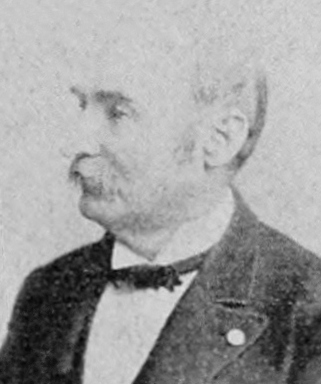

22nd Ohio Secretary of State
- In office January 10, 1881 – January 8, 1883
- Governor: Charles Foster
- Preceded by: Milton Barnes
- Succeeded by: James W. Newman

Member of the Ohio House of Representatives from the Athens County district
- In office January 7, 1878 – January 9, 1881
- Preceded by: Charles H. Grosvenor
- Succeeded by: Charles L. Kurtz

Member of the Ohio Senate from the 9th district
- In office January 2, 1888 – January 5, 1890
- Preceded by: Calvin S. Welch
- Succeeded by: V. C. Lowrey

Personal details
- Born: December 22, 1834 Belmont County, Ohio
- Died: January 12, 1900 (aged 65)
- Party: Republican
- Spouse: Margaret J. Allen
- Children: three
- Education: Ohio University; Cincinnati Law School

Military service
- Allegiance: United States of America
- Branch/service: (United States) Union Army
- Years of service: August 10, 1861 -September 22, 1864
- Rank: Major
- Unit: 30th Ohio Infantry

Charles Townsend (1834-1900) was a Republican politician in the Ohio House of Representatives, Ohio Senate, and was Ohio secretary of state from 1881 to 1883.

== Biography ==
Charles Townsend was born December 22, 1834, in Harrisville, Belmont County, Ohio, to Samuel H. Townsend and Rebecca Morrison, and removed to Athens County in childhood. He attended common schools, and taught school for expenses as he attended Ohio University, where he graduated in 1861. He founded Decamp Institute in Meigs County, Ohio, and was in charge of that school when the American Civil War began. In July, 1861, he enlisted in the Union Army, and in August was made a captain in the Thirtieth Ohio Volunteer Infantry. On January 27, 1864, he was made Major of the regiment. After the War he graduated from Cincinnati Law School in 1866. Townsend was elected Prosecuting Attorney of Athens County, Ohio, three times.

In 1877 he was elected to the Ohio House of Representatives for the 64th General Assembly, and re-elected in 1879 for the 65th. He resigned when he was elected Ohio Secretary of State in 1880, and ran again in 1882, but was defeated. He served as State Commander of the Grand Army of the Republic, and was elected to the Ohio Senate in 1887 for the 9th District in the 68th General Assembly.

Townsend married Margaret Jane Allen in October 1859, and had three children, Helen, Charles and Mary. He was a Mason.

== Notes ==
Political offices
Preceded by Milton Barnes	Secretary of State of Ohio; 1881–1883	Succeeded by James W. Newman
