= Benjamin R. Cowen =

American journalist

Benjamin Rush Cowen
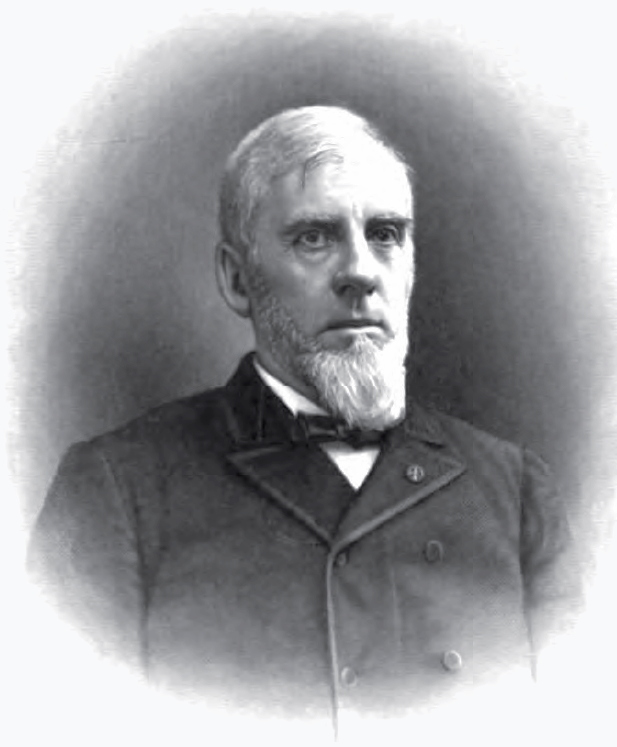

13th Ohio Secretary of State
- In office January 1862 – May 1862
- Governor: David Tod
- Preceded by: Addison P. Russell
- Succeeded by: Wilson S. Kennon

Personal details
- Born: August 15, 1831 Moorefield Township, Harrison County, Ohio, US
- Died: January 19, 1908 (aged 76) Cincinnati, Ohio, US
- Resting place: Greenwood Cemetery, Bellaire, Ohio
- Party: Republican
- Spouse: Ellen Thoburn
- Children: eight

Military service
- Allegiance: United States
- Branch/service: United States Army; Union Army
- Rank: Brevet brigadier general
- Battles/wars: American Civil War

Benjamin Rush Cowen (August 15, 1831 – January 19, 1908) was Union Army general during the American Civil War and a Republican politician who was Ohio Secretary of State.

Benjamin Rush Cowen was born in Moorefield Township, Harrison County, Ohio. His father, Benjamin S. Cowen was later elected to Congress. He grew up in St. Clairsville, Belmont County, Ohio, where he attended a classical institute, and served an apprenticeship in printing at the Belmont Chronicle, where he became owner and editor at age 17. He completed studies in medicine, but never practiced.

On September 19, 1854, Cowen was married to Ellen Thoburn of Belmont County. She had eight children, three of whom survived him. In 1856, as an alternate, he attended the National Convention of the Republican Party in Philadelphia, which Nominated Fremont for the Presidency. He sold the Chronicle in 1858 and was in real estate in Bellaire. In the 54th General Assembly, he was Chief Clerk of the Ohio House of Representatives, and served during the 1860 and adjourned 1861 session. In October 1861 he was elected Ohio Secretary of State, but resigned for War duties in May 1862.

== Civil War ==
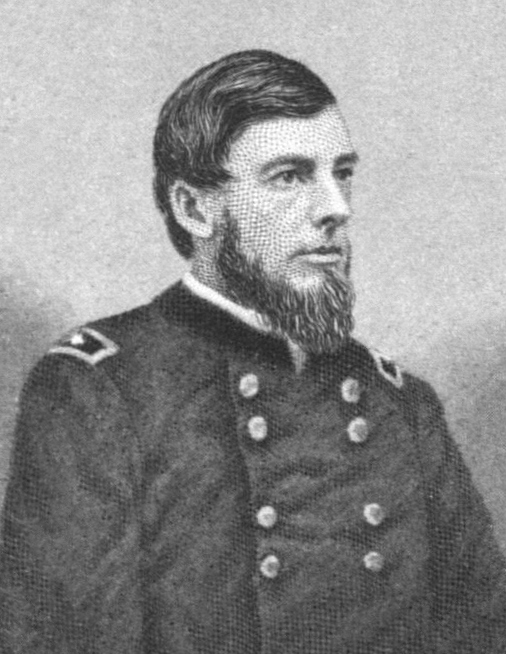
circa 1865

Whitelaw Reid in Ohio in the War had this to say of Cowen's service:

His first military appointment was that of Engineer-in-Chief, with the rank of Colonel, on Governor Dennison's staff. This post he resigned on the fall of Fort Sumter, and enlisted as a private in Captain Wallace's company in the 15th Ohio Infantry. He did not, however, sever his relationship with the Legislature, which was then in session, until its adjournment, when he joined his regiment in Zanesville. He was commissioned First-Lieutenant May 24th, and assigned to duty as Assistant-Commissary of Subsistence. In the summer of 1861, he received the appointment as Additional Paymaster, dating from June 1. He served at Washington and West Virginia in this capacity. He also served at the time as Pay Agent for Ohio, in forwarding soldier's pay to their friends at home. In December, 1863, he was ordered to New Orleans, as chief paymaster of the Department of the Gulf; but before leaving for that post he was tendered the position of Adjutant-General of Ohio, by Governor Brough. He accepted this, and having obtained leave of absence, with suspension of pay and allowances, he entered upon his new duties in January, 1864. ... It was "for meritorious services while acting as Adjutant-General of the State of Ohio in organizing, equipping and forwarding to the field, the troops known as the Ohio National Guards," that he received the successive appointments of Brevet Lieutenant Colonel, Brevet Colonel, and Brevet Brigadier-General, to date from March 13, 1865. General Cox retained General Cowen in the same position.

— Whitelaw Reid, 1895

Although Cowen's brevet brigadier general appointment ranked from the omnibus date of March 13, 1865, President Andrew Johnson nominated Cowen for appointment to the grade of brevet brigadier general of volunteers on January 13, 1866, and the United States Senate confirmed the appointment on March 12, 1866.

== Post war ==
In 1867, Cowen was a candidate for Governor at the Republican State Convention, but lost out to General Hayes. He was offered nomination as lieutenant-governor, but declined. In 1868, he was a delegate to the Republican National Convention. In 1869 he was appointed supervisor of revenue for California, Nevada, Utah, and Arizona, and transferred the following year to the southern district of Ohio. From 1871 to 1876 he was assistant secretary of the interior under President Grant. Grant gave Cowen a number of special assignments, and he is credited with helping to establish Yellowstone National Park.

From 1877 to 1882 Cowen engaged in business in Bellaire and Cincinnati. From 1882 to 1884 he was editor of the Ohio State Journal in Columbus. From 1884 to his death he was Clerk of the United States Circuit and District Courts for the Southern District of Ohio, and lived in Cincinnati.

Cowen became a member of the Literary Club of Cincinnati, and was a frequent public speaker on matters historical and patriotic. He died at Cincinnati January 29, 1908. He was buried at Greenwood Cemetery, Bellaire.

== Publications ==
- Cowen, Benjamin Rush (1904). "The Conquest of the Indian". Ohio Archaeological and Historical Publications. 14: 139–147.

== Notes ==
Political offices
Preceded by Addison P. Russell	Ohio Secretary of State; 1862	Succeeded by Wilson S. Kennon
Preceded by William Tod Otto	Assistant Secretary of the Interior; 1871–1876	Succeeded by Charles T. Gorham
