= James W. Newman =

American politician

James Wirt Newman
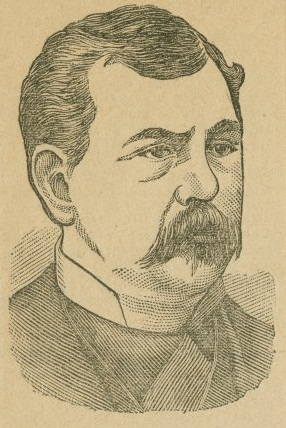

23rd Ohio Secretary of State
- In office January 8, 1883 – January 12, 1885
- Governor: Charles Foster; George Hoadly
- Preceded by: Charles Townsend
- Succeeded by: James Sidney Robinson

Member of the Ohio House of Representatives from the Scioto County district
- In office January 6, 1868 – January 2, 1870
- Preceded by: Elijah Glover
- Succeeded by: Elijah Glover

Member of the Ohio Senate from the 7th district
- In office January 1, 1872 – January 2, 1876
- Preceded by: James Emmett
- Succeeded by: I. T. Monahan

Personal details
- Born: March 12, 1841 Highland County, Ohio
- Died: January 1, 1901 (aged 59) Portsmouth, Ohio
- Party: Democratic
- Spouse: Kate Moore
- Children: one
- Education: Ohio Wesleyan University

James Wirt Newman (March 12, 1841 – January 1, 1901) was a Democratic politician in the Ohio House of Representatives, Ohio Senate, and was Ohio secretary of state from 1883 to 1885.

== Biography ==
James W. Newman was born March 12, 1841, in Highland County, Ohio, and moved soon thereafter to Portsmouth, Ohio. He attended public schools in that town and graduated from Ohio Wesleyan University in 1861, where he was Sigma Chi. He did not serve his country during the American Civil War. For 33 years he was editor and owner of the Portsmouth Times, and after, President of the Central National Bank of Portsmouth.

Newman was active in the Democratic Party, serving as President of the Scioto County central committee, and as delegate to the state and national conventions. He was elected in 1867 to represent Scioto County in the Ohio House of Representatives in the 58th General Assembly in 1868 and 1869. He was elected to represent the 7th District in the 60th and 61st General Assemblies in the Ohio Senate in 1872-1876.

Newman defeated Republican Charles Townsend and two other candidates for Ohio Secretary of State with a majority of the vote in 1882, and served 1883 to 1885. He lost to James Sidney Robinson in another four way race in the 1884.

Newman was Collector of Internal Revenue 1885 to 1889. Newman was married to Kate Moore October 24, 1871. They had one son, Howard Ott Newman. He was Exalted Ruler of the Portsmouth Elks Lodge. He died January 1, 1901, at Portsmouth, or perhaps January 1, 1902.

== Notes ==
Political offices
Preceded by Charles Townsend	Secretary of State of Ohio; 1883–1885	Succeeded by James S. Robinson
