= Ohio History =

- Discipline: History
- Language: English

Publication details
- Former name: See history
- History: 1887–2024
- Publisher: Ohio Historical Society (1887–2007), Kent State University Press (2007–2024) (United States)
- Frequency: Semiannually

Standard abbreviations
- ISO 4: Ohio Hist.

Indexing
- ISSN: 0030-0934
- OCLC no.: 138597892

Links
- Journal homepage; Online archive; Journal page at Ohio Historical Society website

Ohio History was a peer-reviewed academic journal that covered the history of Ohio and the Midwest. The journal was established in 1887 and published by the Ohio Historical Society. From 2007 to its discontinuation in 2024, it was published annually by the Kent State University Press. The Ohio Historical Society maintains an online, searchable archive of volumes 1–113, sponsored by the Ohio Public Library Information Network.

In spring 2020, Ohio History transitioned from being a hard copy print journal to an online open access publication with the stated goal of making scholarship more widely available. Kent State University Press announced the journal's discontinuation after the fall 2024 issue.

== History ==
The journal has been known by a variety of names:

- Vol. 1–2 Ohio Archaeological and Historical Quarterly
- Vol. 3–43 Ohio Archaeological and Historical Publications
- Vol. 44–58 Ohio Archaeological and Historical Quarterly
- Vol. 59–63 Ohio State Archaeological and Historical Quarterly
- Vol. 64–70 The Ohio Historical Quarterly
- Vol. 71–131 Ohio History
