= Carmi Thompson =

American politician (1870–1942)

Carmi Alderman Thompson
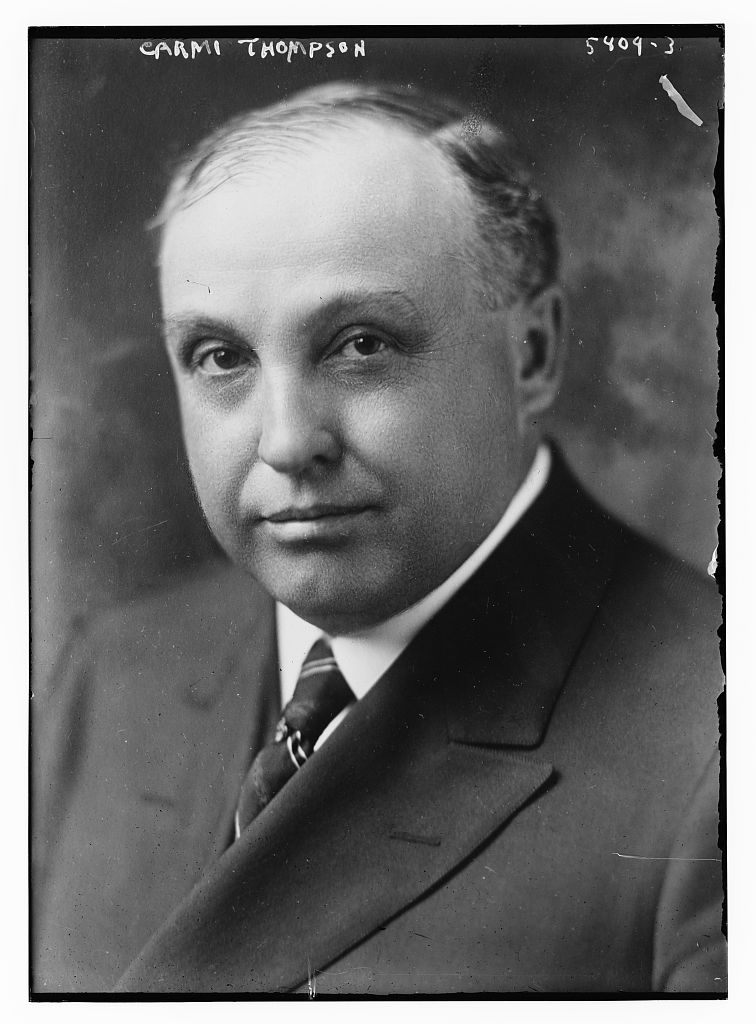

Treasurer of the United States
- In office November 22, 1912 – March 13, 1913
- Appointed by: William Howard Taft
- Preceded by: Lee McClung
- Succeeded by: John Burke

Secretary to the President
- In office July 18, 1912 – November 22, 1912
- President: William Howard Taft
- Preceded by: Charles D. Hilles
- Succeeded by: Joseph Patrick Tumulty

30th Ohio Secretary of State
- In office January 14, 1907 – January 9, 1911
- Governor: Andrew L. Harris; Judson Harmon
- Preceded by: Lewis C. Laylin
- Succeeded by: Charles H. Graves

Speaker of the Ohio House of Representatives
- In office January 1, 1906 – January 13, 1907
- Preceded by: George T. Thomas
- Succeeded by: Freeman T. Eagleson

Member of the Ohio House of Representatives from the Lawrence County district
- In office January 4, 1904 – January 13, 1907
- Preceded by: Daniel B. Mauck
- Succeeded by: A. Clark Lowry

Personal details
- Born: September 4, 1870 Wayne County, West Virginia, U.S.
- Died: June 22, 1942 (aged 71) Cuyahoga County, Ohio, U.S.
- Resting place: Woodland Cemetery, Ironton, Ohio
- Party: Republican
- Education: Ohio State University College of Law
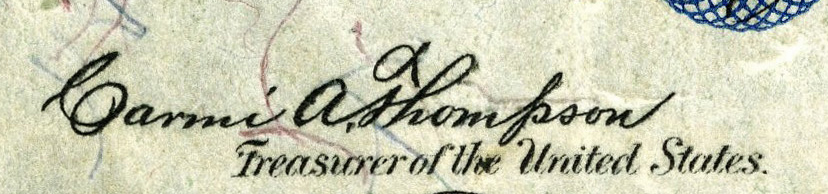
- Signature

Carmi Alderman Thompson (September 4, 1870 – June 22, 1942) was an American attorney and Republican politician in the U.S. state of Ohio who was Speaker of the Ohio House and Ohio Secretary of State from 1907 to 1911. He also fought in the Spanish–American War.

== Biography ==
Carmi Thompson was born at Wayne County, West Virginia. He was moved to Ironton, Ohio, when he was three years old, where he graduated from Ironton High School in 1886.

Thompson graduated from Ohio State University in 1892, and taught at the High School in Bement, Illinois, for two years. He returned to Ohio State, and graduated from the law school in 1895 with a degree Bachelor of Laws. He began practice in Ironton. He was appointed, and then elected City Solicitor of Ironton from 1896 to 1903.

Thompson was elected to the Ohio House of Representatives in 1903 and served in the 76th and 77th General Assemblies, 1904–1906. In the 77th General Assembly (1906), he was chosen Speaker of the House. In 1906, he was nominated, and then elected Secretary of State, resigned from the House, and served in 1907–1911.

During the Spanish–American War, Thompson was captain of Company I of the 7th O. U. S. V. I. He was colonel of the 7th regiment, O.N.G., from 1901 to 1906. He was commander in chief of the United Spanish War Veterans in 1926.

He was Treasurer of the United States, and after 1913, he was in the iron ore and shipping business.

During the final year of William Howard Taft's presidency, Thompson served as Secretary to the President.

In 1921 he was a member of the advisory committee to the conference on limitation of armaments held at Washington, D.C. In 1926, President Calvin Coolidge appointed him special commissioner to make a survey of the economic and internal conditions of the Philippines.

Thompson was nominated for Ohio Governor in 1922, but lost to Democrat A. Victor Donahey.

Thompson died on June 22, 1942, at Cuyahoga County, Ohio.

== Notes ==
Political offices
Preceded by Lewis C. Laylin	Ohio Secretary of State; 1907–1911	Succeeded by Charles H. Graves
Ohio House of Representatives
Preceded by Daniel B. Mauck	Representative from Lawrence County; 1904–1906	Succeeded by A. Clark Lowry
Preceded by George T. Thomas	Speaker of the House; 1906	Succeeded by Freeman T. Eagleson
Government offices
Preceded by Lee McClung	Treasurer of the United States; November 22, 1912 – March 31, 1913	Succeeded by John Burke
Party political offices
Preceded by Harry L. Davis	Republican Party nominee for Governor of Ohio; 1922	Succeeded by Harry L. Davis
