= Harvey C. Smith =

American politician

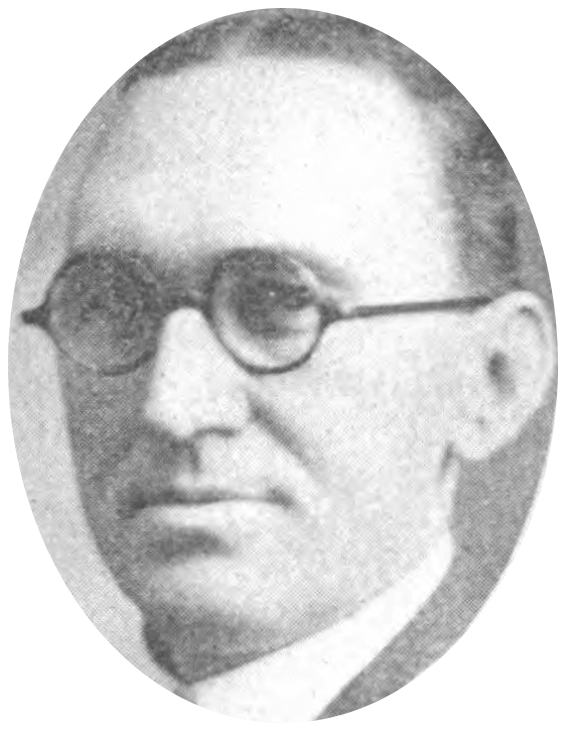

34th Ohio Secretary of State
- In office January 13, 1919 – January 8, 1923
- Governor: James M. Cox; Harry L. Davis
- Preceded by: William D. Fulton
- Succeeded by: Thad H. Brown

Personal details
- Born: July 7, 1874 Coshocton County, Ohio, US
- Died: May 26, 1929 (aged 54) Columbus, Ohio, US
- Resting place: Woodlawn Cemetery, Zanesville, Ohio, US
- Party: Republican
- Spouse: Cora E. Littick
- Children: one

Harvey C. Smith (July 7, 1874 – May 26, 1929) was a Republican politician in the U.S. state of Ohio who served as Ohio Secretary of State 1919-1923.

== Biography ==
Harvey C. Smith was born in Coshocton County, Ohio, and moved to Muskingum County, Ohio, in childhood. He was a schoolteacher and newspaper publisher before being elected to three terms as Muskingum County Probate Judge, where he earned a statewide reputation. He was elected Ohio Secretary of State in 1918, and re-elected in 1920.

Harvey C. Smith married Cora E. Littick and had one son, Clyde. He died in 1929 in Columbus, Ohio, and is buried in Woodlawn Cemetery, Zanesville, Ohio.

Political offices
Preceded by William D. Fulton	Secretary of State of Ohio; 1919–1923	Succeeded by Thad H. Brown
