= Ted W. Brown =

American politician (1906–1984)

44th Secretary of State of Ohio
- In office January 8, 1951 – January 8, 1979
- Preceded by: Donald K. Zoller
- Succeeded by: Anthony J. Celebrezze Jr.

Personal details
- Born: April 19, 1906; Springfield, Ohio, U.S.
- Died: August 20, 1984 (aged 78); Columbus, Ohio, U.S.
- Political party: Republican
- Spouse: Florence Mitchell (m. 1926)
- Children: 3

Ted W. Brown (April 19, 1906 – August 20, 1984) was an American politician of the Ohio Republican party and long-time Ohio Secretary of State.

First elected in 1950, he was re-elected eight times. In 1970, Brown defeated Ohio Democrat John F. Kennedy. In 1974, Brown won re-election by defeating Democrat Tony P. Hall. In 1978, Brown lost his seat when he was narrowly defeated by Anthony J. Celebrezze Jr. in a race that required a recount.

He died in 1984 at his Columbus home of cancer, aged 78.

Party political offices
| Preceded by Edward J. Hummel | Republican nominee for Ohio Secretary of State; 1950, 1952, 1954, 1956, 1958, 1962, 1966, 1970, 1974, 1978 | Succeeded by Virgil E. Brown |
Political offices
| Preceded by Charles F. Sweeney | Ohio Secretary of State; 1951–1979 | Succeeded by Anthony J. Celebrezze Jr. |
