= Ohio Secretary of State =

Elected statewide official in the State of Ohio

Secretary of State of Ohio
- Seal of the secretary of state

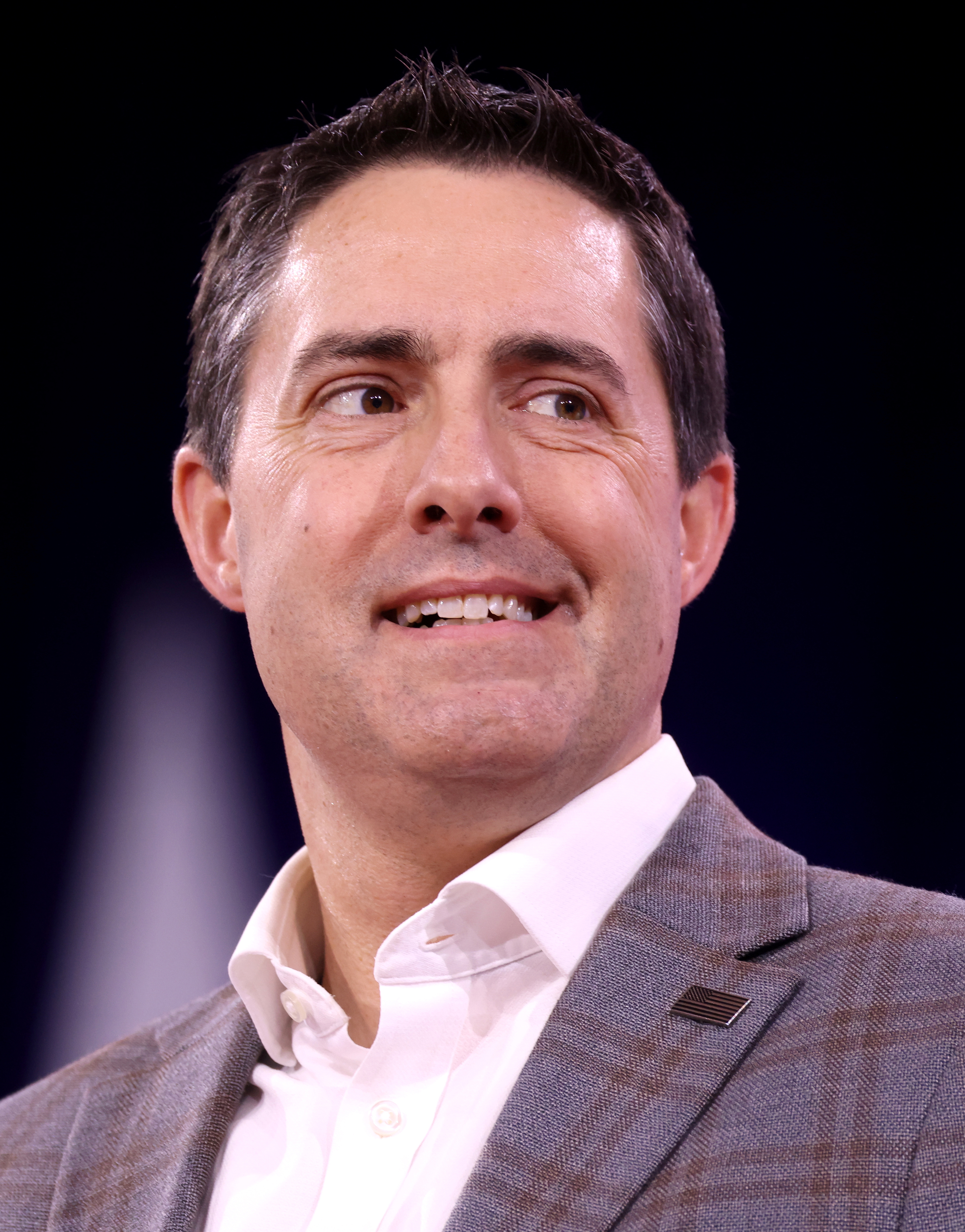
- Incumbent; Frank LaRose since January 14, 2019
- Style: The Honorable
- Term length: Four years, two term limit
- Inaugural holder: William Creighton, Jr. 1803
- Formation: Ohio Constitution
- Succession: Fourth
- Salary: $109,554
- Website: Office of the Ohio Secretary of State

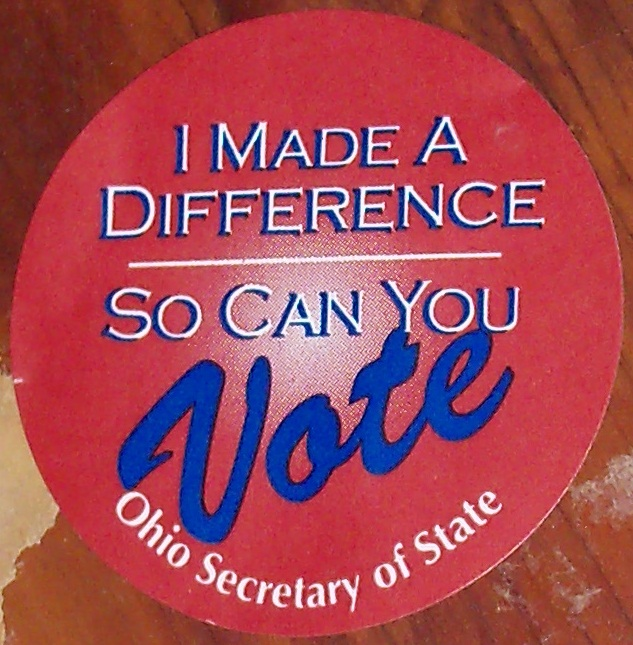
Past Ohio voting sticker

The secretary of state of Ohio is an elected statewide official in the state of Ohio. The secretary of state is responsible for overseeing elections in the state; registering business entities (corporations, etc.) and granting them the authority to do business within the state; registering secured transactions; and granting access to public documents.

From 1803 to 1851, the Ohio secretary of state was elected by the Ohio General Assembly to a three-year term. The 1851 Ohio Constitution made the office elective, with a two-year term. In 1954, the office's term was extended to four years. The secretary of state is elected in even-numbered, off cycle years, (no Presidential elections), after partisan primary elections.

== List of Ohio secretaries of state ==
#	Image	Secretary of State	Term of office	Party
1		William Creighton Jr.	1803–1808	Democratic Republican
2		Jeremiah McLene	1808–1831	Democratic-Republican
3		Moses H. Kirby	1831–1835	Whig
4		Benjamin B. Hinkson (Note: Resigned February 12, 1836.)	1835–1836	Democratic
5		Carter B. Harlan (Note: Died in office.)	1836–1840	Democratic
6		William Trevitt	1840–1841	Democratic
7		John Sloane	1841–1844	Whig
8		Samuel Galloway	1844–1850	Whig
9		Henry W. King	1850–1852	Free Soil
10		William Trevitt	1852–1856	Democratic
11		James H. Baker	1856–1858	Republican
12		Addison P. Russell	1858–1862	Republican
13		Benjamin R. Cowen (Note: Resigned.)	1862	Republican
14		Wilson S. Kennon	1862–1863	Republican
15		William W. Armstrong	1863–1865	Democratic
16		William Henry Smith	1865–1868	Republican
17		John Russell	1868–1869	Republican
18		Isaac R. Sherwood	1869–1873	Republican
19		Allen T. Wikoff	1873–1875	Republican
20		William Bell, Jr.	1875–1877	Democratic
21		Milton Barnes	1877–1881	Republican
22		Charles Townsend	1881–1883	Republican
23		James W. Newman	1883-1885	Democratic
24		James Sidney Robinson	1885–1889	Republican
25		Daniel J. Ryan (Note: Resigned April 1891.)	1889–1891	Republican
26		Christian L. Poorman	1891–1893	Republican
27		Samuel McIntire Taylor	1893–1897	Republican
28		Charles Kinney	1897–1901	Republican
29		Lewis C. Laylin	1901–1907	Republican
30		Carmi Thompson	1907–1911	Republican
31		Charles H. Graves	1911–1915	Democratic
32		Charles Quinn Hildebrant	1915–1917	Republican
33		William D. Fulton	1917–1919	Democratic
34		Harvey C. Smith	1919–1923	Republican
35		Thad H. Brown	1923–1927	Republican
36		Clarence J. Brown	1927–1933	Republican
37		George S. Myers (Note: Resigned December 31, 1936.)	1933–1936	Democratic
38		William J. Kennedy	1936–1939	Democratic
39		Earl Griffith	1939–1940	Republican
40		George M. Neffiner	1940–1941	Republican
41		John E. Sweeney	1941–1943	Democratic
42		Edward J. Hummel	1943–1949	Republican
43		Donald K. Zoller	1949–1951	Republican
44		Ted W. Brown	1951–1979	Republican
45		Anthony J. Celebrezze Jr.	1979–1983	Democratic
46		Sherrod Brown	1983–1991	Democratic
47		Bob Taft	1991–1999	Republican
48		Ken Blackwell	1999–2007	Republican
49		Jennifer Brunner	2007–2011	Democratic
50		Jon Husted	2011–2019	Republican
51		Frank LaRose	2019–present	Republican
52		Allison Russo	2027–	Democratic

== See also ==
- Ohio Secretary of State elections
- Ohio Attorney General
