= Buck (surname) =

Buck is a surname. Notable people with the surname include:

== Arts and entertainment ==
- Adolf Buck (1896–1952), German-Liechtensteiner photographer
- David Buck (1936–1989), British actor
- Detlev Buck (born 1962), German film director
- Dudley Buck (1839–1909), American composer
- Frederick Buck (1771–1840), Irish portrait miniature painter
- John E. Buck (born 1946), American sculptor and printmaker
- Julie Buck (born 1974), American artist and photographer
- Margaret Warriner Buck (1857–1929), American botanical artist
- Mary K. Buck (1849–1901), Bohemian-born American author
- Nathaniel Buck (died 1759/1774), English engraver and printmaker, brother of Samuel Buck
- Pearl S. Buck (1892–1973), American novelist
- Percy Buck (1871–1947), English musician
- Peter Buck (born 1956), American musician
- Rinker Buck (born 1950), American author
- Rob Buck (1958–2000), American guitarist and songwriter
- Samantha Buck (born 1974), American actress
- Samuel Buck (1696–1779), English engraver and printmaker, brother of Nathaniel Buck
- Tara Buck (born 1975), American actress
- Zechariah Buck (1798–1879), English organist and choirmaster

== Politics, law, and government ==
- Antony Buck (1928–2003), British politician
- Arthur Buck (born 1935), Canadian politician
- Clarence F. Buck (1870–1944), American politician and businessman
- C. Douglass Buck (1890–1965), American engineer and politician, Governor and Senator of Delaware
- Daniel Buck (1753–1816), United States Representative from Vermont
- Daniel Buck (judge) (1829–1905), American jurist and politician
- E. C. Buck (1852–1925), American politician from Virginia
- Ed Buck (born 1954), American Democrat political activist and fundraiser
- Edward Charles Buck (1838–1916), British civil servant (Indian Civil Service)
- Frank Buck (Tennessee politician) (born 1943), American politician
- Fred C. Buck (died 1964), American politician from Virginia
- George L. Buck (1866–1939), American politician
- John R. Buck (1835–1917), United States congressman
- Kathleen A. Buck (1948–2001), American politician and attorney
- Ken Buck (born 1959), American politician
- Leonard W. Buck (1834–1895), American businessman, rancher and politician
- Molly Buck, American politician
- Peter Buck (mayor) (died 1625), English mayor and naval official
- Peter Henry Buck or Te Rangi Hīroa (1877–1951), New Zealand doctor, military leader, health administrator, politician, anthropologist and museum director
- Tim Buck (1891–1973), long-time leader of the Communist Party of Canada
- Tom Buck (1938–2020), American lawyer and politician
- Walt Buck (1930–2013), Canadian politician
- Wilhelm Buck (1869–1945), German politician

== Science, mathematics, and medicine ==
- Dudley Allen Buck (1927–1959), American scientist, engineer, educator, and inventor
- Gurdon Buck (1807–1877), American surgeon, performed first clinical photograph, contributed to numerous fields of surgery
- Peter Henry Buck or Te Rangi Hīroa (1877–1951), New Zealand doctor, military leader, health administrator, politician, anthropologist and museum director
- Robert Creighton Buck (1920–1998), American mathematician

== Sports ==
- Bill Buck (cricketer) (born 1946), English cricketer
- Bill Buck (footballer) (1900–1980), Australian footballer
- Bob Buck (sportscaster) (1938–1996), American sportscaster
- Craig Buck (born 1958), American former volleyball player
- David Buck (footballer) (1946–1996), English footballer
- Elisha A. Buck (1840–1893), American harness racing executive and newspaper publisher
- Fred Buck (1880–1952), British football player
- Gilles Buck (1935–2010), French sailor who competed in the 1968 Summer Olympics
- Harold Buck, British rugby league footballer
- Harry Buck (1884–1943), American coach and physical education instructor
- Jack Buck (1924–2002), American sportscaster
- Joe Buck (born 1969), American sportscaster
- John Buck (baseball player) (born 1980), American baseball player
- Richard Buck (sprinter) (born 1986), English sprinter
- Travis Buck (born 1983), American baseball player
- Mike Buck (American football) (born 1967), American football player
- William Buck (baseball) (fl. 1866–1871), American baseball player and umpire

== Other fields ==
- Bill Buck (environmentalist), American environmentalist and producer
- Carl Darling Buck (1866–1955), American linguist
- Carrie Buck (1906–1983), unsuccessful plaintiff in Buck v. Bell, which upheld compulsory sterilization
- David J. Buck, United States Air Force general
- Florence Buck (1860–1925), American Unitarian minister, educator, suffragist
- Frank Buck (animal collector) (1884–1950), American hunter, animal collector, and film director
- George Buck (1560–1622), English antiquarian
- Jim Buck (dog walker) (1931–2013), American dog walker
- Paul Herman Buck (1899–1978), American historian
- Peter Buck (restaurateur) (1930–2021), American restaurateur and philanthropist
- Robbie Buck (born 1972), Australian radio announcer
- Robert N. Buck (1914–2007), American aviator
- Solon J. Buck (1884–1962), Archivist of the United States
- William Buck (translator) (1933–1970), American writer who produced English versions of the Mahabharata and Ramayana

== See also ==
- Justice Buck (disambiguation)
