= William Buck =

William Buck may refer to:

- William Buck (baseball) (fl. 1866–1871), American baseball player and umpire
- William Buck (translator) (1933–1970), American writer who produced English versions of the Mahabharata and Ramayana
- William Buck of the Buck baronets
- Bill Buck (environmentalist), American environmentalist and producer
- Bill Buck (cricketer) (born 1946), English cricketer
- Bill Buck (footballer) (1900–1980), Australian footballer

== See also ==
- Buck (surname)
