= Frederick Buck =

Frederick Buck may refer to:

- Frederick Buck (miniaturist), Irish miniature portrait artist
- F. Clarence Buck, United States soldier and Medal of Honor recipient
- Fred Buck (Frederick Richard Buck), English footballer

== See also ==
- Fred C. Buck, American politician and banker from Virginia
