= Bucyk =

Bucyk is a surname. Notable people with the surname include:

- Johnny Bucyk (born 1935), Canadian ice hockey player
- Randy Bucyk (born 1962), Canadian ice hockey player, nephew of Johnny

== See also ==
- Buck (surname)
