= Samuel S. Cox =

American politician and diplomat (1824–1889)

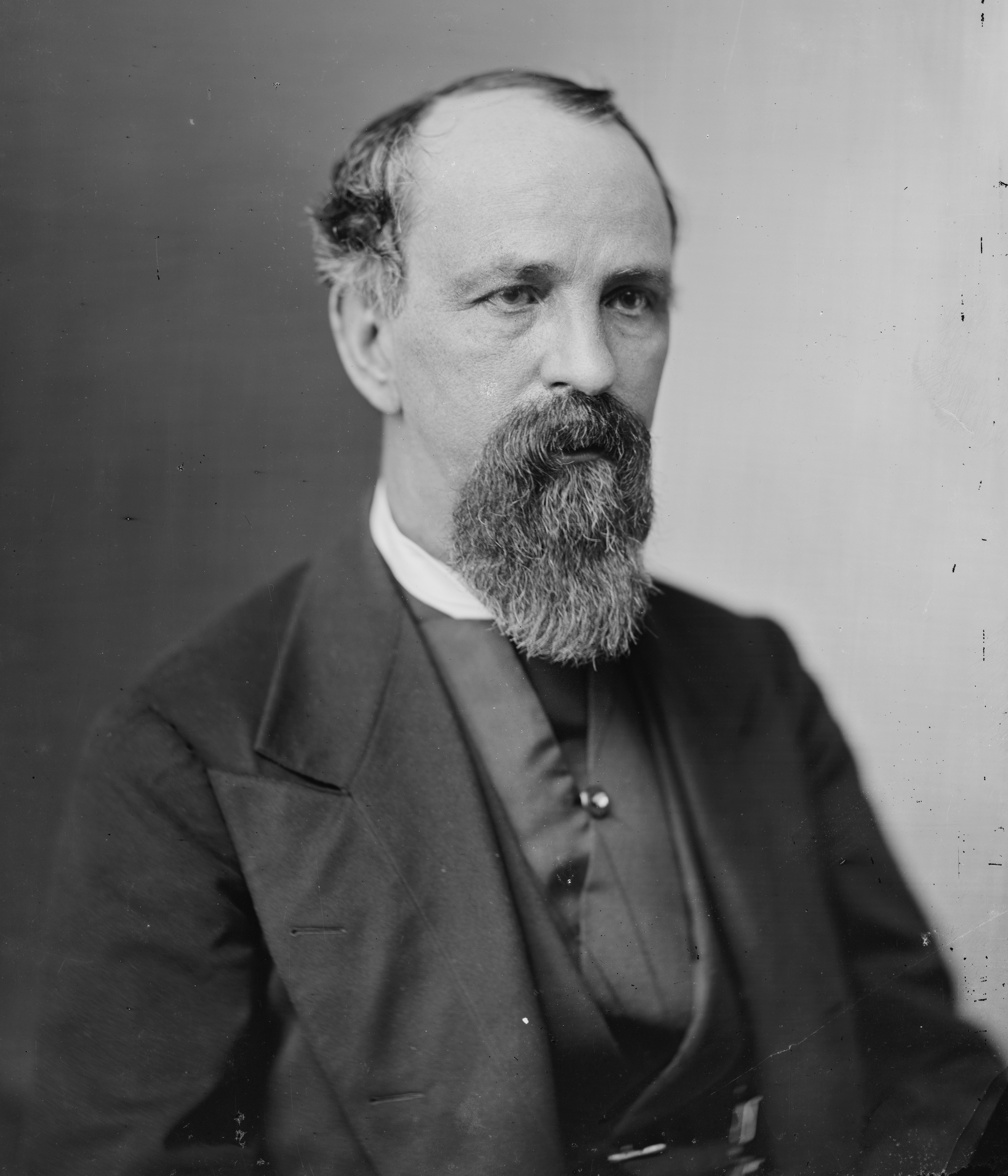
- Cox c. 1870s

Chairman of the House Democratic Caucus
- In office March 4, 1887 – March 3, 1889
- Speaker: John G. Carlisle
- Preceded by: John R. Tucker
- Succeeded by: William S. Holman

Envoy Extraordinary and Minister Plenipotentiary to the Ottoman Empire
- In office August 25, 1885 – September 14, 1886
- Appointed by: Grover Cleveland
- Preceded by: Lew Wallace
- Succeeded by: Oscar Solomon Straus

Member of the U.S. House of Representatives
- In office November 2, 1886 – September 10, 1889
- Preceded by: Joseph Pulitzer
- Succeeded by: Amos Cummings (redistricting)
- Constituency: New York 9th
- In office November 4, 1873 – May 20, 1885
- Preceded by: James Brooks
- Succeeded by: Timothy J. Campbell
- Constituency: New York 6th (1873–1885); New York 8th (1885)
- In office March 4, 1869 – March 3, 1873
- Preceded by: Thomas E. Stewart
- Succeeded by: James Brooks
- Constituency: New York 6th
- In office March 4, 1857 – March 3, 1865
- Preceded by: Samuel Galloway
- Succeeded by: Samuel Shellabarger
- Constituency: Ohio 12th (1857–1863); Ohio 7th (1863–1865)

Personal details
- Born: September 30, 1824 Zanesville, Ohio, U.S.
- Died: September 10, 1889 (aged 64) New York City, U.S.
- Resting place: Green-Wood Cemetery
- Party: Democratic
- Education: Ohio University; Brown University
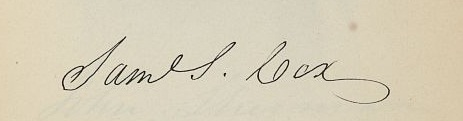
- Signature

Samuel Sullivan "Sunset" Cox (September 30, 1824 – September 10, 1889) was an American congressman and diplomat. He represented both Ohio and New York in the United States House of Representatives and served as United States Ambassador to the Ottoman Empire.

During and before the American Civil War, Cox was a moderate member of the Copperhead faction, who supported peace with the South at any cost. He voted against the Thirteenth Amendment to the United States Constitution. After moving to New York, he focused his advocacy on trade liberalization, civil service reform, and railroad regulation.

== Early life and education ==
Samuel Sullivan Cox was born on September 30, 1824, in Zanesville, Ohio, to Ezekiel Taylor and Maria Matilda (née Sullivan) Cox.

=== Family ===
Ezekiel Taylor Cox was a journalist and politician in Zanesville, descended from a prominent New Jersey family. His ancestors include Thomas Cox, one of the original proprietors of the Province of East New Jersey, Congressman James Cox, who fought for George Washington's Continental Army, and Joseph Borden, the founder of Bordentown, New Jersey. Ezekiel Cox was a cousin by marriage of U.S. Senator James J. Wilson. In politics, Ezekiel was an uncompromising Jacksonian Democrat.

Cox was named for his maternal grandfather, Samuel Sullivan. Samuel Sullivan served as Ohio Treasurer from 1820–23 and, like Ezekiel Cox, represented Zanesville in the Ohio State Senate.

At fourteen, Cox began serving as an assistant to his father, who was then clerk of the Ohio Supreme Court and of the Court of Common Pleas.

As a child, Cox was described by neighbors as "bright, sunny, genial, fond of fun, sparkling with wit, always truthful, fearless, and generous, never hesitating to confess a fault of his own, and ever ready to defend the weak and oppressed." He was a star student and dreamed of traveling the world. Among his classmates at the academy in Zanesville were future Supreme Court Justice William Burnham Woods and geologist James M. Safford.

=== Education ===
In 1842, Cox entered Ohio University at Athens, which was dominated by a rivalry between the locals and university students. In a memorable incident during his freshman year, the town won a court case against the university and Cox sabotaged a cannon scheduled to be fired in celebration. He soon became determined to leave Athens, which he referred to as a "scaly vale of mud."

By 1844, he was re-enrolled at Brown University in Providence, Rhode Island. There, he joined the fraternity Delta Phi and delivered speeches in support of temperance and Fourierism and in opposition to abolition of slavery, once delivering a rebuttal to visiting lecturer Wendell Phillips.

The subject and manner of his speeches were sometimes controversial, and Cox had some difficulty fitting in with Yankee society. He wrote home, "There are some monstrous mean fellows among the Yankees." In general, however, he was highly praised for his wit, work ethic, and energy. Among his friends were Franklin J. Dickman, James Burrill Angell, and future Chief Justice of the Rhode Island Supreme Court Thomas Durfee. He graduated in 1846 and returned to Ohio.

== Early career ==
=== Legal career ===
As a student, Cox read legal treatises in his spare time, including Blackstone's Commentaries and William Cruise's Digest of the Laws of England Respecting Real Property. Upon returning to Ohio, Cox continued his study of law, first in the offices of Judge C.W. Searle, and then with Judge Convers. In Judge Convers's office, Cox's fellow student was future Governor of Ohio George Hoadly. He completed his studies under Vachel Worthington in Cincinnati.

After admittance to the Ohio bar, Cox formed a partnership with George E. Pugh, who later represented Ohio in the U.S. Senate.

=== Journalism ===
While on his honeymoon in Europe in 1851, Cox wrote "A Buckeye Abroad," a collection of letters about his travels. It was greeted with praise, leading Cox to abandon the law for the field of journalism. In 1853, he purchased a controlling interest in the Ohio Statesman, a Democratic newspaper in Columbus, Ohio. He became its editor and engaged, as was typical of newspaper men of the time, in political activity.

As a young editor (and as an erstwhile writer at Brown), Cox expounded some of his political beliefs, including his opposition to the American System of the Whig Party and support for free trade.

=== Entry to politics ===
In 1853, Ohio Democratic State Committee chairman Washington McLean resigned on the condition that Cox be his successor. As Party chair, Cox was tasked with managing the 1853 campaign of William Medill for Governor. Medill was elected by an overwhelming majority, launching Cox as a rising star in Ohio politics. He was summoned to meet President Franklin Pierce.

In 1855, Pierce offered Cox the position of Secretary of Legation at the Court of St. James's, but Cox declined and requested to join the legation to Peru. He set sail for Peru but fell ill, returned to the United States, and resigned his commission.

== U.S. Representative from Ohio ==
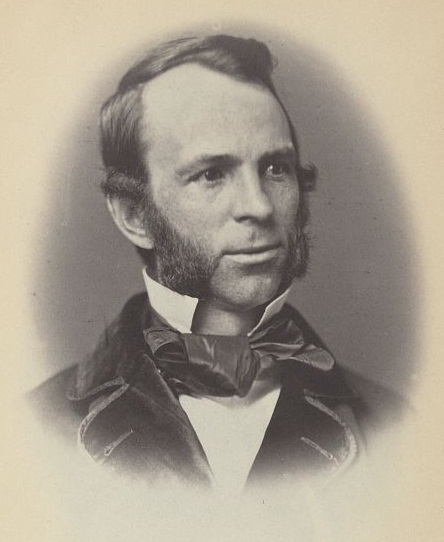
During Cox's first term in Congress, he positioned himself as a moderate anti-Buchanan member of the Democratic Party.

In 1856, Cox accepted the Democratic nomination to represent the Columbus region in the U.S. House of Representatives. He narrowly defeated Republican Samuel Galloway to win the seat. In his first term, Cox chaired the committee on Revolutionary Claims.

On December 16, 1857, Cox delivered the maiden speech in the newly completed House chamber in the south wing of the Capitol building. The bold speech positioned Cox squarely as a supporter of Senator Stephen A. Douglas's "popular sovereignty," as opposed to President James Buchanan and the proposed Lecompton constitution for Kansas. Cox's speech was credited as helping sink the Lecompton constitution and leading to the eventual admission of Kansas as a free state. Buchanan had his revenge by removing Cox's friend from the office of Postmaster of Columbus.

Cox was re-elected in 1858 by a slightly larger majority. He remained an opponent of the Buchanan administration and an ally of Senator Douglas amid growing sectional and political divide in Congress. In 1860, despite growing divisions and the election of Abraham Lincoln, Cox expanded his majority again, in a rematch with Galloway. As Southern states began to secede in the winter of 1860–61, Cox issued a plea for unity and caution. When Senator Douglas died in 1861, Cox delivered a eulogy to him in the House.

=== Civil War ===
Initially, Cox resolved to sustain the Lincoln administration "in every constitutional endeavor to put down the rebellion." However, he opposed "that abolition policy which sought to convert this holy war for the defence of the government and the union into a mere anti-slavery party war."

In 1862, Cox's already-Republican district was redrawn to become even more Republican, but he defeated Samuel Shellabarger by a small majority.

In 1863, Cox opposed the Thirteenth Amendment to the United States Constitution to abolish slavery, on the grounds that peace was near at hand and the amendment would scuttle negotiations. "As slavery was already dead by the bullet, I figured it would be better to stop the bloodshed," he told a crowd seven years later. That mattered more than "the mere empty, abstract ceremonial of burying the dead corpse of slavery."

In 1864, Cox took an active part in the campaign against Lincoln's re-election, denouncing Republicans for allegedly supporting miscegenation. He was defeated for reelection by Shellabarger in a landslide, largely by the vote of Union soldiers. Six weeks after he left Congress, the Civil War was over and President Lincoln was assassinated.

Despite his steadfast opposition to abolition efforts, Cox remained on positive terms with Lincoln months before his assassination and was praised in later years by Lincoln's Secretary of State William H. Seward as a member of the loyal opposition.

== U.S. Representative from New York ==
After leaving Congress, Cox moved to New York City to return to the practice of law, in partnership with Charlton Thomas Lewis. Cox published memoirs of his time in Congress, titled Eight Years in Congress.

During the impeachment trial of Andrew Johnson in the winter of 1867–68, Cox was summoned to Washington to lobby the decisive vote, Senator John B. Henderson of Missouri, against impeachment. Cox and Henderson were on close terms. Henderson did vote against impeachment, though Cox disclaimed any credit to his own influence.

=== Reconstruction ===
In 1868, the Democratic Party selected Cox as the nominee for Congress to represent Greenwich Village, Chelsea, and the West Village. He won the general election in a landslide. Tammany Hall elected Cox to Congress in New York, and it kept him there, but he was never the subject of serious accusations of corruption. "Mr. Cox is ... almost the only honest man I know who passed through a portion of the Tweed Ring period," another politician said later.

After a second trip to Europe, limited to the Mediterranean coast by his ill health, Cox returned to find Congress dominated by the issue of Reconstruction. Cox supported reconciliation with the South and the restoration of voting rights for Confederate veterans. In 1869, he introduced a general amnesty bill to this effect, but failed to achieve the necessary two-thirds majority by two votes.

In 1870, Cox defeated Horace Greeley, the editor of the New York Tribune, by 1,000 votes. Cox spent much of the next Congress in an effort to abolish the test oath system, which required all civil servants and military officers to swear they had not engaged in disloyal conduct during the War. The effort succeeded as to members of Congress but not other offices. A complete repeal of the test oath was not passed until 1884.

In 1872, Cox was nominated by a fusion ticket of Democrats and anti-Grant Republicans for U.S. Representative at-large. Horace Greeley, his opponent in 1870, was the ticket's presidential nominee, putting Cox in the unusual position of stumping for his most recent rival. Cox lost the election to Republican Lyman Tremain. In the lame duck session, Cox unsuccessfully opposed a salary increase for members of Congress and returned the excess salary ($4,812) he received to the Treasury.

Soon after his departure from Congress, U.S. Representative James Brooks died, leaving a vacant seat along the East River, stretching from the Lower East Side to Murray Hill. Cox consented to be nominated in the special election, and won in a landslide. Ultimately, Cox did not miss a single day of the Congressional session. Along with Pennsylvania Representative Samuel J. Randall, he led the opposition to the civil rights for freedmen. He was returned to the House from a slightly redrawn Lower East Side district in a landslide in 1874.

=== House leadership ===
The 1874 House elections gave the Democrats their first post-War majority. Cox, who had been nominated for the position as a matter of party honors under Republican majorities, was one of three candidates for Speaker of the House. The other candidates were Samuel Randall and Michael C. Kerr. Cox drew enthusiastic support from the West and South, but ultimately finished third behind Kerr and Randall. As consolation and in recognition of his years of service, Cox was named Chairman of the powerful Committee on Banking and Currency in 1875.

Early in 1876, Speaker Kerr was seized with fatal illness and Cox served as acting Speaker on occasion. Cox was ultimately named Speaker pro tem on June 19. However, Cox left the capital to serve as a delegate to the 1876 Democratic National Convention, and Milton Sayler was chosen to fill the Speakership. When Cox returned, Sayler did not relinquish the chair. After Kerr's death, Randall was elected his successor in the 45th Congress and Cox was additionally placed at the head of the committee on the Tenth Census. In the contested election of 1876, Cox loyally supported Democrat Samuel Tilden over Rutherford B. Hayes and implicitly gave his support to a special committee bill to investigate irregularities in Hayes states, but gave a speech urging the House to accept Hayes as the victor.

In 1881, Cox took an extended global trip. He first visited London, attending the funeral of Benjamin Disraeli and the House of Commons, where the debate over the Bradlaugh case further reinforced his opposition to the test oath. Later, he traveled to Constantinople and Jerusalem. Cox was in Tarsus when he learned of the assassination of President James A. Garfield via telegram.

Upon his return to the United States, Cox became active in the movements for civil service reform and restrictions on foreign contract labor.

== U.S. Ambassador to the Ottoman Empire ==
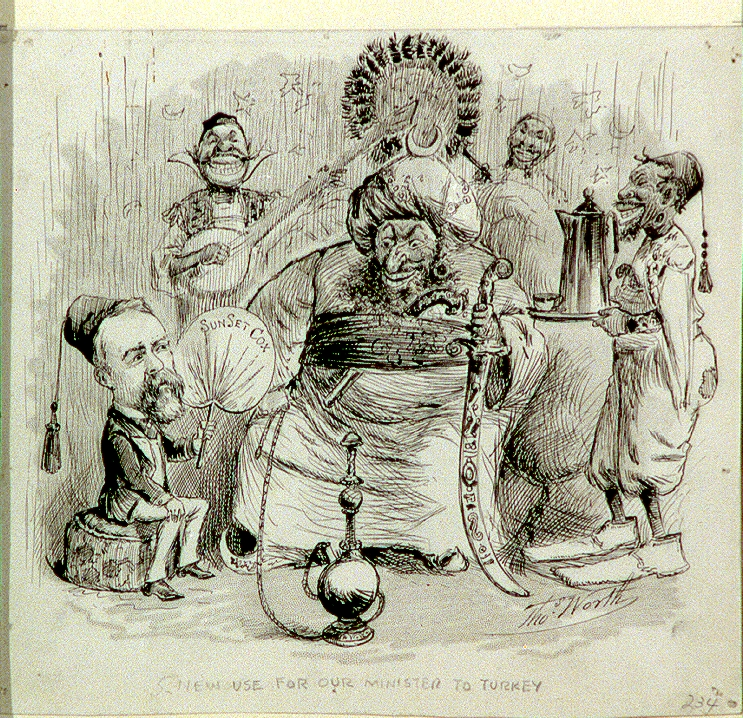
"New Use For Our Minister to Turkey"

In 1884, New York Governor Grover Cleveland was elected President, the first Democrat since Buchanan. In May 1885, Cleveland nominated Cox as ambassador to the Ottoman Empire. Cox resigned his seat to accept appointment, citing the frantic pace of Congress and his continued minor role. Before departing for Constantinople, he published a second memoir, Three Decades of Federal Legislation.

Arriving in Constantinople on August 1, Cox was received by the Sultan's Foreign Minister. Cox spent much of his time touring the eastern Mediterranean, including the Nile River and Princes' Islands.

== Return to Congress ==
After serving for a year as Minister, Cox resigned in 1886, citing homesickness and a desire to return to domestic politics. He ran for Congress to fill the vacant seat left by Joseph Pulitzer, once again representing the Lower East Side (specifically the area known today as Alphabet City). He had, once again, missed a minimal amount of Congressional service, and Representative Cummings claimed that Cox was thus the first man elected twice to the same Congress (the 49th).

During his last term, he was chairman of the House Democratic Caucus and once again served as chair of the Census Committee. He actively supported measures to irrigate the western United States, drawing on desert aridity he had witnessed as Minister. He broke with his party in supporting the annexation of new Western states in 1889.

In 1888, Cox declined to run for Mayor of New York. He ran instead for Congress and won. However, he died before the 51st Congress met.

== Politics and legacy ==
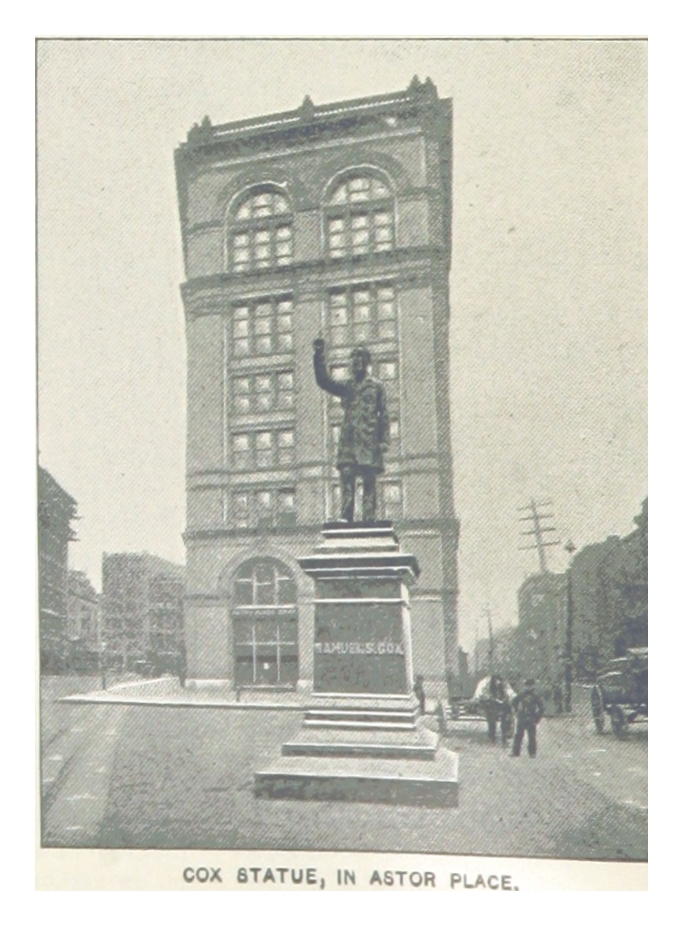
COX STATUE, IN ASTOR PLACE

Cox was an advocate against the persecution of the Jews worldwide and in Russia and Germany in particular and of the Irish, working to free Irish prisoners of England. He advocated for the annexation of Cuba as early as 1859.

He was a backer of the Life Saving Service, later merged into the United States Coast Guard. He was also known as the "letter carriers' friend" because of his support for paid benefits and a 40-hour work week for U.S. Post Office employees. In 1891, grateful postal workers raised $10,000 to erect a statue of Cox by sculptor Louise Lawson in New York City. It was originally placed near his home on East 12th Street but was later moved to its present location in Tompkins Square Park. It depicts Cox orating and has been criticized as a poor likeness. The statue became controversial in 2020.

Cox wrote several books including Why We Laugh, A Buckeye Abroad (1852), Eight years in Congress, from 1857 to 1865 (1865) and Three Decades of Federal Legislation, 1855-1885 (1885). His colleagues appreciated him most for his ready sense of humor, usually gentle rather than cutting. Indeed, some of them thought that his joking quality may have kept him from becoming Speaker of the House, because, for all his hard work and studious habits, he was not taken seriously. "In his political action he seemed more anxious to annoy his opponents than to extinguish them," Congressman George S. Boutwell of Massachusetts wrote, in a typical dismissal. "His speeches were short, pointed and entertaining. He was a favorite with the House, but his influence upon its action was very slight. Those who acquire and retain power are the earnest and persistent men. When Cox had made his speech and expended his jokes he was content. The fate of a measure did not much disturb or even concern him." Cox once whimsically suggested that those supporting a high protective tariff duty on foreign coal should likewise lay a heavy duty on the sun, as a dangerous competitor in warming people up.

Others who served longer with him realized that Cox also had the grit and parliamentary skill to make a formidable adversary in debate. Speaker of the House Thomas Brackett Reed said, "in action he was a whole skirmish line, and has covered more movements of the Democratic party, and led it out of more parliamentary pitfalls than any of its orators and all its leaders put together."

== Personal life ==
Cox married Julia A. Buckingham on October 11, 1849. The two first met aboard a stage coach on Cox's way to Brown and became reacquainted upon his return to Zanesville as a lawyer. They honeymooned in Europe from May to September 1851 and saw the Great Exhibition. Julia wrote many of his speeches.

Cox's nickname "Sunset" came from a florid description of a "stormful sunset" he wrote as a young editor at the Ohio Statesman, on May 19, 1853. The sobriquet was used by some to insinuate Cox was a chronic exaggerator. James H. Baker, then the editor of the Scioto Gazette, a Whig newspaper in Chillicothe, gave him the title "by reason of a highly wrought and sophomoric editorial on a flaming sunset after a great storm."

Cox was an avid traveler and kept detailed accounts of his trips abroad.

== Publications ==
The isles of the Princes; or, The pleasures of Prinkipo

- Cox, Samuel S. (1859) [Orig. pub. New-York: G. P. Putnam, 1852]. A Buckeye abroad; or, Wanderings in Europe, and in the Orient. Columbus: Follett, Foster and Co.
- — (1852). The scholar, as the true progressive and conservative: illustrated in the life of Hugo Grotius, and by the law of nations. An address delivered before the Athenian literary society of the Ohio University, August 3, 1852. Columbus: Printed by Scott & Bascom.
- — (1857). Lecompton constitution of Kansas. Speech of Hon. Samuel S. Cox, of Ohio, on the President's message. Delivered in the House of Representatives, December 16, 1857. [Washington]: Printed by Lemuel Towers.
- — (1859). Ohio politics. Cox after Giddings. "Father Giddings" dodges under the bush with his colored friend. [Washington]: [Printed by L. Towers].
- — (1859). Speech of Hon. S. S. Cox, of Ohio, on territorial expansion. Delivered in the House of Representatives, January 18, 1859. Washington: Printed by L. Towers.
- — (1859). Speech of Hon. S. S. Cox, of Ohio, in reply to Hon. Thomas Corwin, on the election of speaker. Delivered in the House of Representatives, December 8, 1959. Washington: Printed by L. Towers.
- — (1861). Conciliation and nationality!. [Washington]: [Printed by L. Towers].
- — (1861). Northern nullifiers. Reply of Hon. S. S. Cox, of Ohio, in reply to Messrs. Hutchins and Stanton. Delivered in the House of Representatives, February 9, 1861. [Washington]: [Printed by L. Towers].
- — (1862). Eulogy of Hon. Stephen Arnold Douglas, one of the regents of the Smithsonian Institution. Prepared at the request of the board, by Hon. Samuel S. Cox ... May, 1862. Washington: The Smithsonian Institution.
- — (1862). Emancipation and its results—is Ohio to be Africanized? Speech of Hon. S.S. Cox, of Ohio. Delivered in the House of Representatives, June 6, 1862. [Washington]: [L. Towers & Co., Printers].
- — (c. 1862). Meaning of the elections of 1862. Speech of Hon. S. S. Cox, of Ohio. Delivered in the House of Representatives, December 15, 1862. [Washington]: [L. Towers & Co., printers].
- — (1862). Speech of Hon. S.S. Cox, of Ohio, in vindication of Gen. McClellan from the attacks of congressional war critics. [Washington, D.C.]: [Towers & Co., printers].
- — (1863). Puritanism in politics. Speech of Hon. S. S. Cox, of Ohio, before the Democratic Union Association, January 13, 1863. New York: Van Evrie, Horton & co.
- — (1863). The conscription bill. Speech of Hon. S.S. Cox, of Ohio. Delivered in the House of Representatives, February 26, 1863. [Washington]: [Towers, Print.]
- — (1864). Free debate in Congress threatened—abolition leaders and their revolutionary schemes unmasked. Speech of Hon. Samuel S. Cox, of Ohio, delivered in the House of Representatives, April 6, 1864. [Washington].
- — (1865). The cabinet in Congress. Speeches of Hon. S.S. Cox, of Ohio, on the joint resolution to admit the cabinet into the House of Representatives, for debate, etc. Delivered in the House of Representatives, January 26, 1865. [Washington].
- — (1865). Eight years in Congress, from 1857 to 1865. New York: D. Appleton and Company.
- — (1866). Speech of Hon., S. S. Cox, before the Johnson Union Club of the 6th Congressional District, New York, on the 9th of August, 1866. [New York].
- — (1870). Dedicated to the workingman!. [Washington]: [The National Democratic Executive Resident Committee].
- — (1870). Dem arbeiterstand gewidmet. [Washington]: [Demokratisches executiv-committee in Washington].
- — (1872). Bleeding—not health. Washington: F. & J. Rives & G. A. Bailey.
- — (1872). Grant of Greeley? Speech of S. S. Cox, of New-York city, in the issues of the presidential campaign of 1872. New-York: S. W. Green, printer.
- — (1872). Negotiation of loan—The syndiacate—what is it?. [Washington]: [Printed at the Congressional Globe Office].
- — (1874). Economy—education—mixed schools. Washington: Government Printing Office.
- — (1874). The folly and cost of diplomacy. Washington.
- — (1874). Gold and good faith; paper money and panic. Washington: Government Printing Office.
- — (1875). Punishment or pardon; force or freedom, for the wasted land. Speech of Hon. S. S. Cox, of New York, in the House of Representatives, Saturday, February 27, 1875, on the bill (H. R. no. 4745) to provide against the invasion of states, to prevent the subversion of their authority, and to maintain the security of elections; the sections of which provide penalties of fine and imprisonment, suspension of habeas corpus, appointment of federal election supervisors in the Congressional districts, etc. Washington: Government Printing Office.
- — (1875). Tax and tariff. Washington: [Government Printing Office].
- — (1876). Amnesty and the Jefferson Davis amendment. Washington: Government Printing Office.
- — (1876). Beauties of diplomacy. Speech of Hon. Samuel S. Cox, of New York, in the House of Representatives, February 9, 1876. Washington: [Government Printing Office].
- — (1876). Key to the dead lock. Speech of Hon, Samuel S. Cox, of New York, in the House of Representatives. Washington: [Government Printing Office].
- — (1876). The organization of the House;—who defend the administration?. Washington: [Government Printing Office].
- — (1876). Protection to American citizens abroad—Germans and Irish—parties and platforms. Washington: [Government Printing Office].
- — (1969) [Orig. pub. New York: Harper & Brothers, 1876]. Why we laugh. New York: B. Blom.
- — (1877). De jure and de facto: long talk of Hon. Samuel S. Cox, at Tammany Hall, New York City, July 4, 1877. New York: The National Printing Co.
- — (1877). Expositions exposed. Washington: [Government Printing Office].
- — (1878). Life: —its perils and slavation. Washington: R. O. Polkinhorn, printer.
- — (1878). The Monmouth Centennial [microform]: Oration of Hon. S.S. Cox. Freehold, N.J.: Monmouth Democrat.
- — (1878). Pretense—and practice. Can fraud reform the civil service?. Washington: [Government Printing Office].
- — (1879). Speech of Hon. S. S. Cox on the federal census. [Washington]: [Government Printing Office].
- — (1880). Free land and free trade. New York: G. P. Putnam's Sons.
- — (1880). Liberalities of trade—consular and diplomatic relations. [Washington]: [Government Printing Office].
- — (1880). Search for winter sunbeams in the Riviera, Corsica, Algiers, and Spain. New York: D. Appleton & Company.
- — (1882). Arctic sunbeams: or, From Broadway to the Bosphorus, by way of the North Cape. New York: G. P. Putnam's Sons.
- — (1977) [Orig. pub. New York: Putnam, 1882]. Orient sunbeams : Or, From the porte to the Pyramids by way of Palestine. New York: Arno Press.
- — (1883). Memorial eulogies delivered in the House of Representatives of the United States, by Samuel S. Cox, 1861-1883. Washington: [Government Printing Office].
- — (1884). The test oath—its repeal. Speech of Hon. S. S. Cox. January 21, 1884. [Washington]: [Government Printing Office].
- — (1884). Our revenues and their treatment—wages and their causes—income and outgo ... Speech of Hon. Samuel S. Cox, of New York, in the House of Representatives, Thursday, March 20, 1884. [Washington]: [Government Printing Office].
- — (1884). Tariff and protection—protifs and wages—women-workers and infants—toilers in the factories—wealth and poverty ... Speech of Hon. Samuel S. Cox, of New York, in the House of Representatives, Friday, May 2, 1884. [Washington]: [Government Printing Office].
- — (1884). Address of Hon. S. S. Cox, to Congress, on fish, May 12, 1884. [Washington]: [Government Printing Office].
- — (1884). Decay of integrity - Mortmain and monopoly - Land-trust and restitution - Progress and poverty - A time for reform. Speech of Hon. Samuel S. Cox, in Tammany hall, July 4, 1884. [Washington]: [Government Printing Office].
- — (1885). Three Decades of Federal Legislation, 1855-1885. 2 vols. Providence: J. A. and R. A. Reid.
- — (1970) [Orig. pub. Washington, D.C.: J. M. Stoddart & Company, 1885]. Union—disunion—reunion. Three decades of Federal legislation, 1855 to 1885. Personal and historical memories of events preceding, during, and since the American Civil War, involving slavery and secession, emancipation and reconstruction, with sketches of prominent actors during these periods. Freeport, N.Y.: Books for Libraries Press.
- — (1887). Diversions of a diplomat in Turkey. New York: C. L. Webster & Co.
- — (1887). The isles of the Princes. New York & London: G. P. Putnam's Sons.
- — (1889). Address of Hon. Samuel Sullivan Cox on the parliamentary heroes of Ireland. New York: Metropolitan Job Print.
- — (1889). Address of Hon. Samuel S. Cox ... at Huron, Dakota, July 4. 1889. New York: Metropolitan Job Print.
- — (1889). Division of Dakota. Washington.

== See also ==
- List of members of the United States Congress who died in office (1790–1899)

U.S. House of Representatives
Preceded by Samuel Galloway	Member of the U.S. House of Representatives from Ohio's 12th congressional district 1857–1863	Succeeded by William E. Finck
Preceded by Richard A. Harrison	Member of the U.S. House of Representatives from Ohio's 7th congressional district 1863–1865	Succeeded by Samuel Shellabarger
Preceded by Thomas E. Stewart	Member of the U.S. House of Representatives from New York's 6th congressional district 1869–1873	Succeeded by James Brooks
Preceded by James Brooks	Member of the U.S. House of Representatives from New York's 6th congressional district 1873–1885	Succeeded by Nicholas Muller
Preceded by John J. Adams	Member of the U.S. House of Representatives from New York's 8th congressional district 1885	Succeeded by Timothy J. Campbell
Preceded by Joseph Pulitzer	Member of the U.S. House of Representatives from New York's 9th congressional district 1886–1889	Succeeded by Amos J. Cummings
