= 1861 Minnesota Secretary of State election =

- November 5, 1861
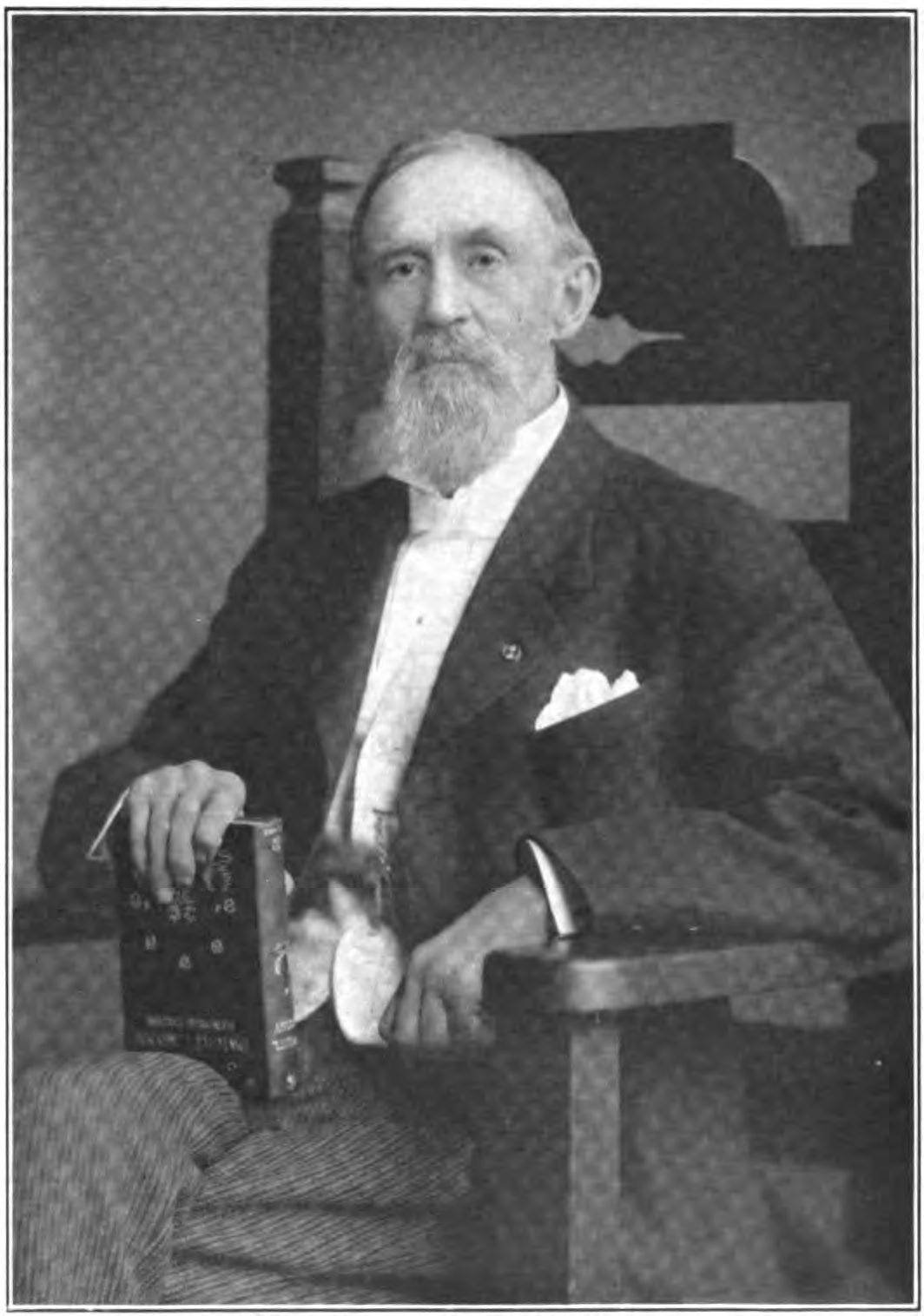

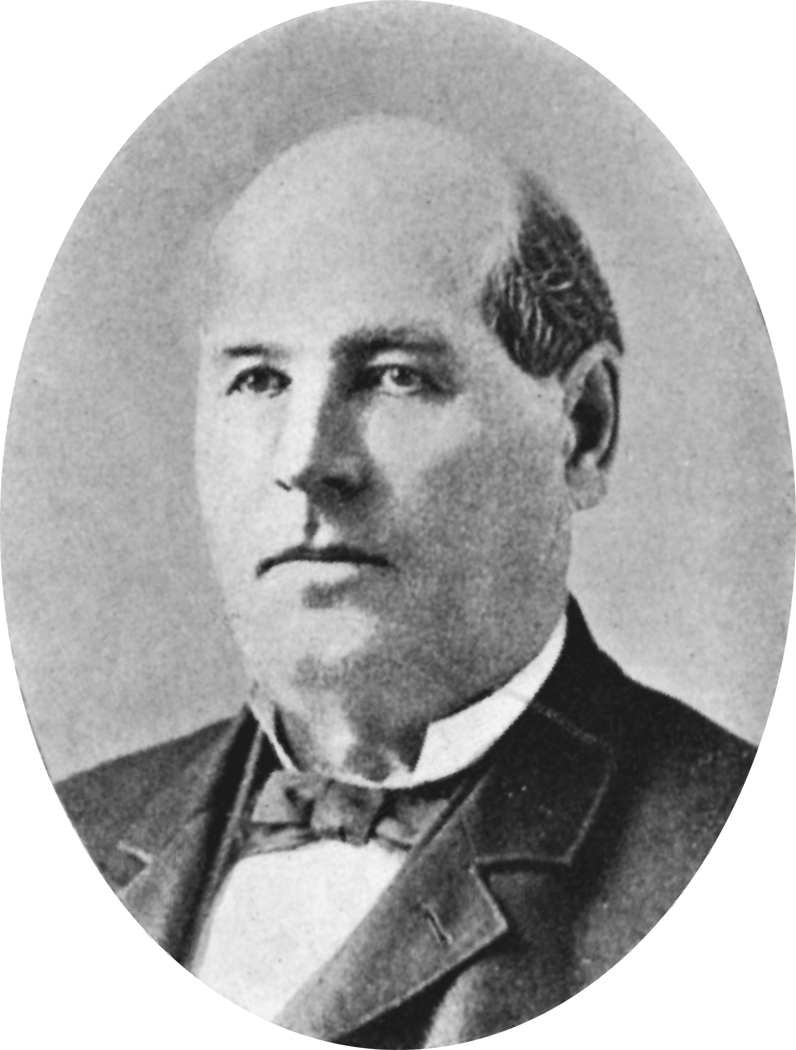
Nominee	James H. Baker	Daniel Buck
Party	Republican	Democratic
Popular vote	16,035	10,589
Percentage	60.22%	39.77%
Secretary of State before election
James H. Baker
Republican
Elected Secretary of State
James H. Baker
Republican

The 1861 Minnesota Secretary of State election was held on November 5, 1861, in order to elect the Secretary of State of Minnesota. Republican nominee and incumbent Secretary of State James H. Baker defeated Democratic nominee Daniel Buck.

== General election ==
On election day, November 5, 1861, Republican nominee James H. Baker won re-election by a margin of 5,446 votes against his opponent Democratic nominee Daniel Buck, thereby retaining Republican control over the office of Secretary of State. Baker was sworn in for his second term on January 2, 1862.

=== Results ===
Minnesota Secretary of State election, 1861
Party	Candidate	Votes	%
Republican	James H. Baker (incumbent)	16,035	60.22
Democratic	Daniel Buck	10,589	39.77
Write-in		5	0.01
Total votes		26,629	100.00
Republican hold			
