= 1859 Minnesota Secretary of State election =

- October 11, 1859
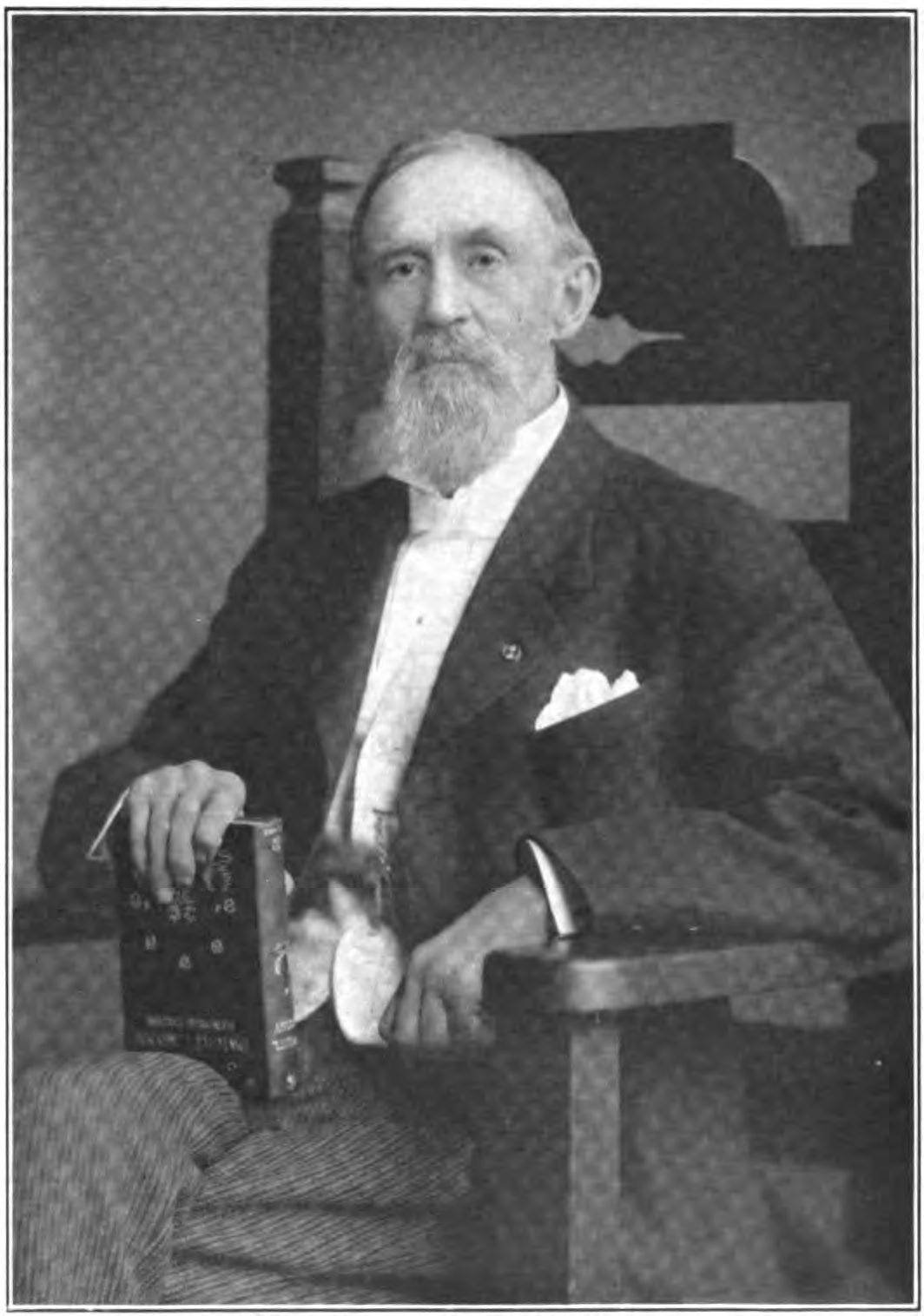

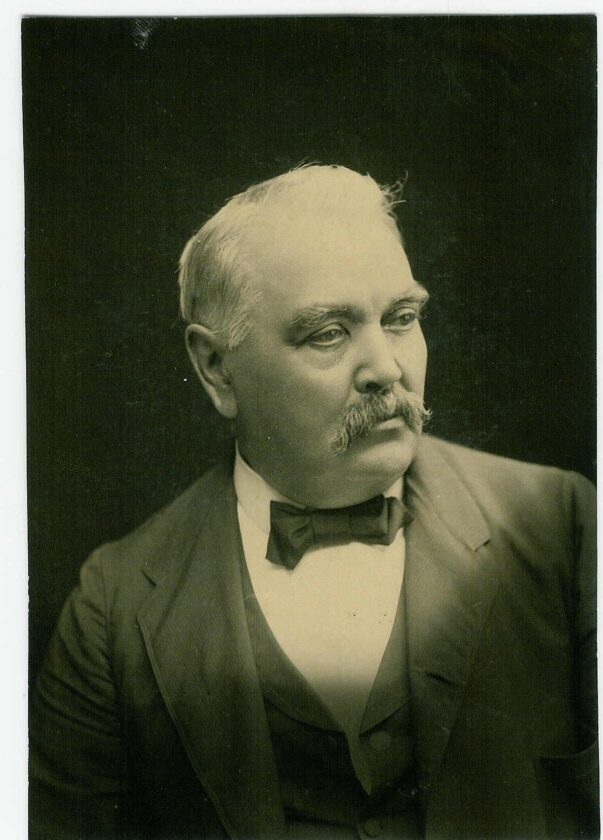
Nominee	James H. Baker	Francis Baasen
Party	Republican	Democratic
Popular vote	20,732	18,039
Percentage	53.47%	46.53%
Secretary of State before election
Francis Baasen
Democratic
Elected Secretary of State
James H. Baker
Republican

The 1859 Minnesota secretary of state election was held on October 11, to elect next the Minnesota secretary of state. Republican candidate and former Ohio Secretary of State James H. Baker defeated Democratic candidate and incumbent Minnesota Secretary of State Francis Baasen.

== General election ==
On election day, October 11, 1859, Republican nominee James H. Baker won the election by a margin of 2,693 votes against his opponent, Democratic nominee Francis Baasen, thereby gaining Republican control over the office of secretary of state. Baker was sworn in as the 2nd Minnesota secretary of state on January 2, 1860.

=== Results ===
Minnesota secretary of state election, 1857
Party	Candidate	Votes	%
Republican	James H. Baker	20,732	53.47
Democratic	Francis Baasen (incumbent)	18,039	46.53
Total votes		38,771	100.00
Republican gain from Democratic			
