= John Sloane (Ohio politician) =

American politician

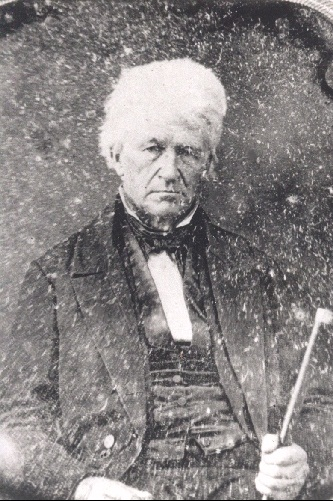

7th Treasurer of the United States
- In office November 27, 1850 – April 6, 1853
- President: Millard Fillmore; Franklin Pierce
- Preceded by: William Selden
- Succeeded by: Samuel L. Casey

Secretary of State of Ohio
- In office 1841–1844
- Governor: Thomas Corwin; Wilson Shannon
- Preceded by: William Trevitt
- Succeeded by: Samuel Galloway

Member of the U.S. House of Representatives from Ohio
- In office March 4, 1819 – March 4, 1829
- Preceded by: Peter Hitchcock
- Succeeded by: John Thomson
- Constituency: 6th district (1819-1823); 12th district (1823-1829)

4th Speaker of the Ohio House of Representatives
- In office December 2, 1805 – November 30, 1806
- Preceded by: Michael Baldwin
- Succeeded by: Abraham Shepherd

Member of the Ohio House of Representatives from Columbiana County
- In office 1807–1808
- Preceded by: John McConnell
- Succeeded by: George Clark; John Crumbacker; William Harbaugh

Member of the Ohio House of Representatives from Jefferson and Columbiana counties
- In office 1804–1806
- Preceded by: New district
- Succeeded by: Samuel Boyd; Thomas Elliott; John McLaughlin John McLaughlin

Member of the Ohio House of Representatives from Jefferson County
- In office 1803–1804
- Preceded by: Rudolph Bair; Zacheus A. Beatty; Thomas Elliott; Isaac Meeks
- Succeeded by: District eliminated

Personal details
- Born: November 3, 1779 York, Pennsylvania, U.S.
- Died: May 15, 1856 (aged 76) Wooster, Ohio, U.S.
- Resting place: Oak Hill Cemetery
- Party: Democratic-Republican

Military service
- Allegiance: United States
- Rank: colonel
- Battles/wars: War of 1812

John Sloane (November 3, 1779 – May 15, 1856) was a U.S. representative from Ohio and later the treasurer of the United States.

Born in York, Pennsylvania, Sloane moved to Ohio in early youth. He completed preparatory studies. He served as member of the Ohio House of Representatives from 1803 to 1805 and again in 1807. Sloane served as colonel of militia in the War of 1812. United States receiver of public moneys at Canton, Ohio from 1808 to 1816 and at Wooster 1816-1819.

Sloane was elected as a Democratic-Republican to the Sixteenth and Seventeenth Congresses, reelected as an Adams-Clay Republican to the Eighteenth Congress, and elected as an Adams candidate to the Nineteenth and Twentieth Congresses (March 4, 1819 – March 4, 1829). He served as chairman of the Committee on Elections (Seventeenth through Twentieth Congresses).

He was appointed clerk of the court of common pleas of Wayne County in 1831 and served several years. He was the Secretary of State of Ohio, 1841–1844.

Sloane was Treasurer of the United States from November 27, 1850, to April 6, 1853. He died in Wooster, Ohio, May 15, 1856. He was interred in Oak Hill Cemetery.

== Sources ==
- United States Congress. "John Sloane (id: S000494)". Biographical Directory of the United States Congress.

Political offices
Preceded by Michael Baldwin	Speaker of the Ohio House of Representatives; December 2, 1805 – November 30, 1806	Succeeded by Abraham Shepherd
Preceded by William Trevitt	Ohio Secretary of State; 1841–1844	Succeeded by Samuel Galloway
Government offices
Preceded by William Selden	Treasurer of the United States; November 27, 1850 – April 6, 1853	Succeeded by Samuel L. Casey
Ohio House of Representatives
Preceded by Rudolph Bair; Zacheus A. Beatty; Thomas Elliott; Isaac Meeks as Representatives from Jefferson County	Representative from Jefferson and Columbiana Counties; 1803–1804; Served alongside: Richard Beeson, Samuel Dunlap, Joseph McKee	District eliminated
New district	Representative from Jefferson County; 1804–1806; Served alongside: Thomas McCune, John McLaughlin (1804–1805); Thomas Elliott, John McLaughlin (1805–1806)	Succeeded by Samuel Boyd; Thomas Elliott; John McLaughlin
Preceded by John McConnell	Representative from Columbiana County; 1807–1808	Succeeded by George Clark; John Crumbacker; William Harbaugh as Representatives from Columbiana and Stark Counties
U.S. House of Representatives
Preceded by Peter Hitchcock	United States Representative from Ohio's 6th congressional district 1819–1823	Succeeded by Duncan McArthur
New district	United States Representative from Ohio's 12th congressional district 1823–1829	Succeeded by John Thomson
