= Marion Murdoch =

American minister (1849–1943)

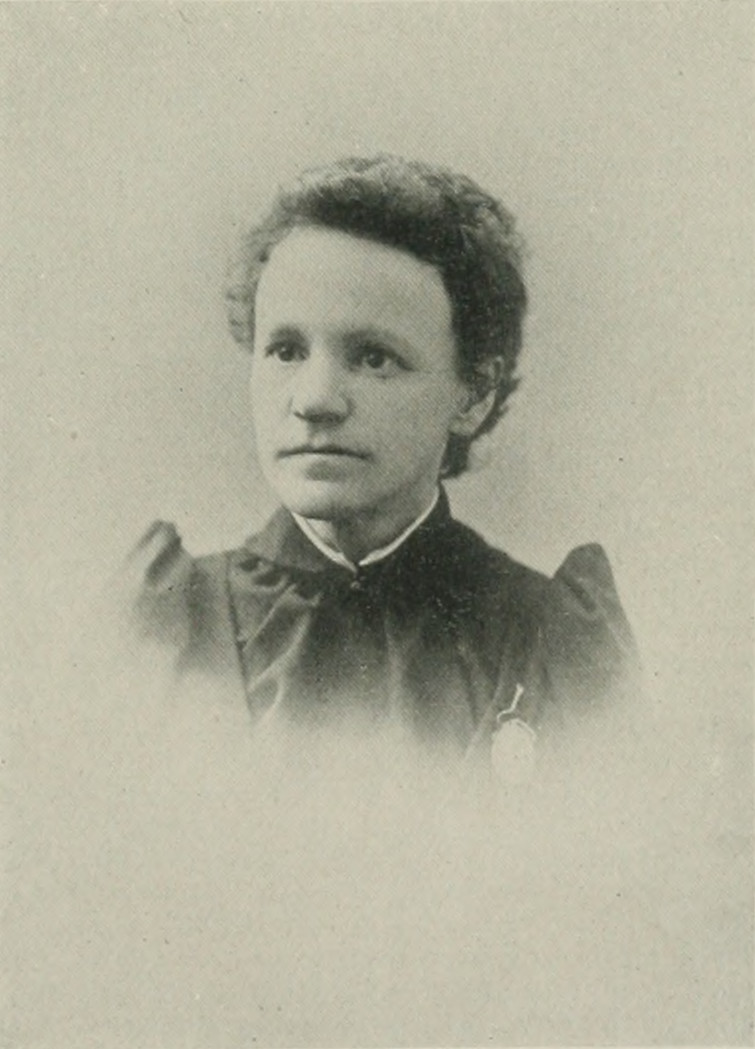
Marion Murdoch, a "Woman of the Century"

Marion Murdoch (October 9, 1849 – January 28, 1943) was an American minister in Iowa. Murdoch was said to be the first woman in America to receive the degree of Bachelor of Divinity.

== Early years and education ==
Murdoch was born in Garnavillo, Iowa, on October 9, 1849. Her father, Judge Samuel Murdoch, was the last living member of the Territorial legislature of Iowa. He had been a member of the state legislature and judge of the district court. Her mother had come from New York in 1837. Murdoch's early life was spent in outdoor pursuits, developing in her that love of nature and desire for a life of freedom for women. Of the family of six children, Marion was the second daughter.

Murdoch was educated at Northwestern Ladies' College, Evanston, Illinois, and the University of Wisconsin. She graduated from Boston University School of Oratory (later known as the Boston School of Oratory), then under the leadership of Prof. Monroe. She was also a graduate of the Meadville (Pennsylvania) Theological School and spent some time in New College, Oxford, England, she and Florence Buck being the first women admitted to this college.

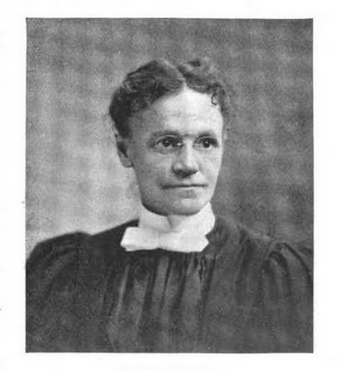
Marion Murdoch, pastor of Unity Church, Cleveland, Ohio

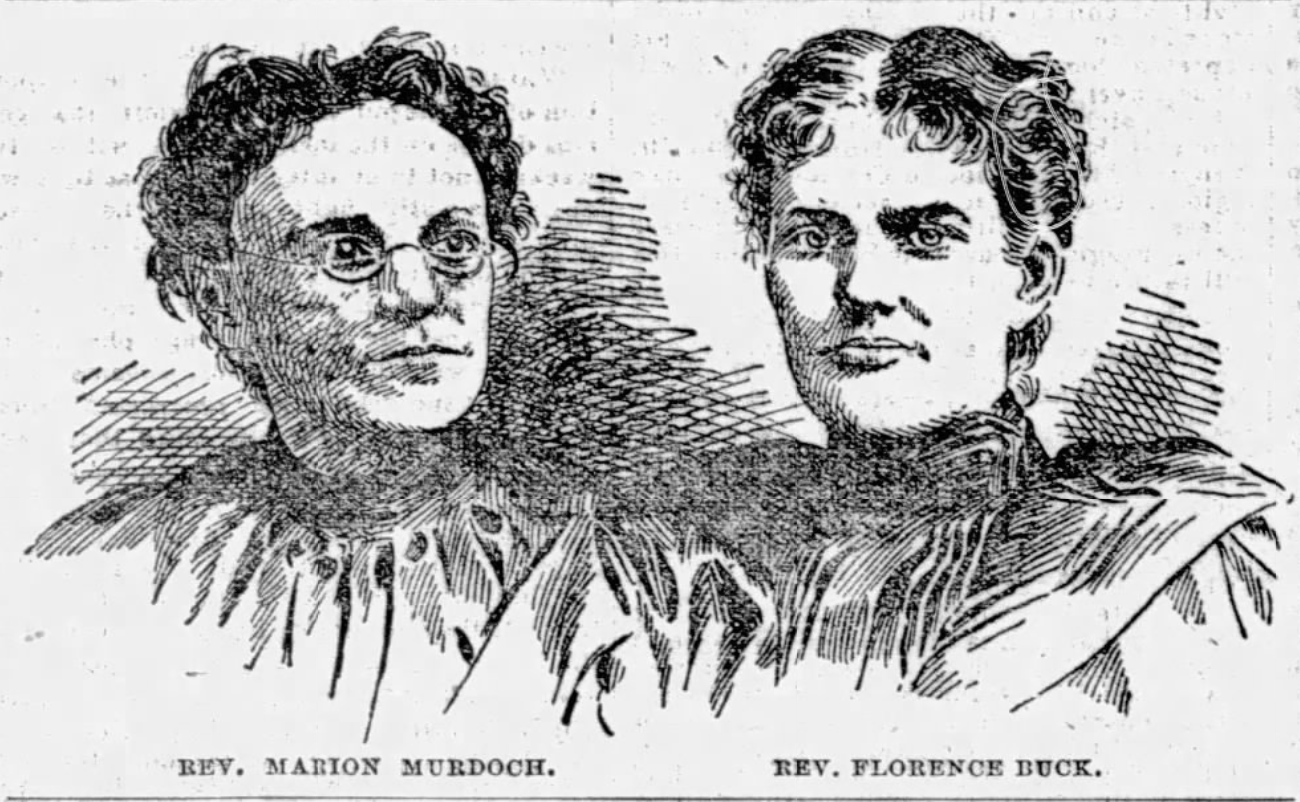
Marion Murdoch and Florence Buck, from an 1894 newspaper.

== Career ==
After graduation from Boston University School of Oratory, she spent several years teaching in Dubuque, Iowa, and Omaha, Nebraska. During that time, she was engaged in institute work each summer, thus developing a reputation in her own state. On deciding to take up the ministry, she entered the School of Liberal Theology in Meadville, Pennsylvania, in 1882. She graduated and took her degree, B. D., from the same school in 1885.

Her active labor in the ministry began while she was still in theological school. She occupied pulpits during school vacations, and occasionally during the school year. After completing her theological course, she was called to Unity Church, Humboldt, Iowa, and remained there five years. Under her management, it became the largest church in the area. She was minister of the First Unitarian Church in Kalamazoo, Michigan, for one year, after which she returned to Meadville Theological School and took a year of post-graduate work. In 1892, she went abroad to take a year's course of lectures at Oxford University. She was at one time professor of mathematics and oratory at the University of Wisconsin.

Murdoch was essentially a reformer, preaching upon questions of social, political, and moral reform. While decided in conviction, she was liberal and generous to opponents of her views. Murdoch and her partner, Florence Buck, were co-pastors at Unity Church in Cleveland, Ohio, from 1894 to 1899. Buck wrote, of their partnership, "I think it takes two persons to make one good pastor. We find that we can accomplish more good by working together than either could do by assuming all the responsibility of church work alone."

Murdoch was popular and active in the social life of her church. She was involved in clubs and study-classes and led Shakespeare classes.

Murdoch died in Santa Monica, California in 1943 at the age of 94.
