= Samuel Galloway =

American politician (1811–1872)

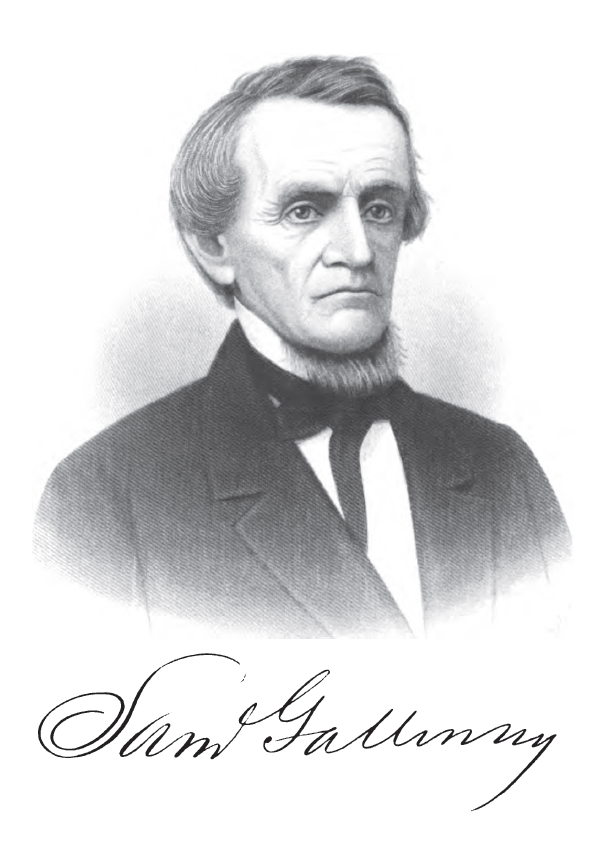

Member of the U.S. House of Representatives from Ohio's 12th district
- In office March 4, 1855 – March 3, 1857
- Preceded by: Edson B. Olds
- Succeeded by: Samuel S. Cox

8th Ohio Secretary of State
- In office 1844–1850
- Governor: Mordecai Bartley; William Bebb; Seabury Ford
- Preceded by: John Sloane
- Succeeded by: Henry W. King

Personal details
- Born: March 20, 1811 Gettysburg, Pennsylvania, US
- Died: April 5, 1872 (aged 61) Columbus, Ohio, US
- Resting place: Green Lawn Cemetery
- Party: Republican; Whig
- Education: Miami University; Princeton Theological Seminary

Samuel Galloway (March 20, 1811 – April 5, 1872) was a U.S. representative from Ohio.

Born in Gettysburg, Pennsylvania, Galloway attended local public schools. He moved to Ohio and settled in Highland County in 1830. He graduated from Miami University in Oxford, Ohio, in 1833. Galloway then attended Princeton Theological Seminary in 1835 and 1836. He taught school in Hamilton, Ohio, 1836 and 1837, at Miami University in 1837 and 1838, and Hanover College, Indiana, in 1839 and 1840.

After studying law, he was admitted to the bar in 1843 and commenced practice in Chillicothe, Ohio. He was the Ohio Secretary of State in 1844, and moved to Columbus that same year. He served as delegate to the Whig National Convention in 1848.

Galloway was elected as an Anti-Nebraska candidate to the Thirty-fourth Congress (March 4, 1855 – March 3, 1857). He was an unsuccessful candidate for reelection in 1856 to the Thirty-fifth Congress and for election in 1858 to the Thirty-sixth Congress. He resumed the practice of law.

During the Civil War, he was appointed as the judge advocate of Camp Chase in Columbus, Ohio, by President Abraham Lincoln. Following the war, Galloway was appointed by President Andrew Johnson to investigate conditions in the South during the period of Reconstruction. He was nominated at the Republican state convention in 1867 for Lieutenant Governor of Ohio, but declined.

Presidential elector for Grant/Colfax in 1868.

He was for thirteen years a ruling elder of the Presbyterian Church.

Galloway died in Columbus, Ohio, April 5, 1872, and was interred in Green Lawn Cemetery, Columbus, Ohio.

== Sources ==
- United States Congress. "Samuel Galloway (id: G000027)". Biographical Directory of the United States Congress.
- Smith, Joseph P, ed. (1898). History of the Republican Party in Ohio. Vol. I. Chicago: the Lewis Publishing Company.

Political offices
Preceded by John Sloane	Ohio Secretary of State; 1844–1850	Succeeded by Henry W. King
U.S. House of Representatives
Preceded by Edson B. Olds	United States Representative from Ohio's 12th congressional district 1855–1857	Succeeded by Samuel S. Cox
