= William Trevitt =

American politician

6th Ohio Secretary of State
- In office June 1840 – 1841
- Appointed by: Wilson Shannon
- Preceded by: Carter B. Harlan
- Succeeded by: John Sloane

10th Ohio Secretary of State
- In office January 12, 1852 – January 13, 1856
- Governor: Reuben Wood; William Medill
- Preceded by: Henry W. King
- Succeeded by: James H. Baker

Member of the Ohio House of Representatives from the Perry County district
- In office December 5, 1836 – December 1, 1839
- Preceded by: Joshua Brown
- Succeeded by: James J. Wilson

Personal details
- Born: February 7, 1809 Mont Vernon, New Hampshire, US
- Died: February 8, 1881 (aged 72) Columbus, Ohio, US
- Resting place: Green Lawn Cemetery, Columbus, Ohio
- Party: Democratic
- Spouse: Lucinda Butler
- Children: Six
- Education: Dartmouth Medical School

William Trevitt (February 7, 1809 – February 8, 1881) was a medical doctor, politician, diplomat, and newspaper publisher in 19th century Ohio. He served two times as Ohio Secretary of State, three years in the Ohio House of Representatives, was a surgeon in the Mexican–American War, and was a diplomat in South America.

== Biography ==
William Trevitt was born February 7, 1809, in Mont Vernon, New Hampshire, youngest son of Henry and Jane Trevitt. He graduated as a doctor of medicine in the Class of 1830 from Dartmouth Medical School, and moved to Baltimore, Fairfield County, Ohio, where he practiced medicine.

Trevitt moved to Thornville, Perry County, Ohio, where he was elected to serve 1836–1839 in the Ohio House of Representatives.

Ohio Secretary of State Carter B. Harlan died in Philadelphia, Pennsylvania, on June 9, 1840. Governor Shannon appointed Trevitt to the position on a temporary basis until the Ohio General Assembly met early in 1841 to elect a successor.

During the Mexican–American War, Trevitt was a surgeon with the Second Ohio Infantry. In 1851, a new constitution in Ohio made the Secretary of State an elective position, and Trevitt defeated the Free Soil Party incumbent and a Whig, and was re-elected in 1853. He lost to a Republican for re-election in 1855, and served January 1852 to January 1856.

From 1857 to 1860, Trevitt was consul to Valparaíso, Chile, and 1860–1861 to Callao, Peru, by appointment of President Franklin Pierce. He returned to Columbus, Ohio, where he entered the newspaper business. He established the Sunday Morning News in November 1867, and published it until selling in 1870.

Trevitt died in Columbus on February 8, 1881. He was interred at Green Lawn Cemetery, Columbus, Ohio. He had married Lucinda Butler in Columbus, and had six children.

== See also ==
- Ohio Secretary of State elections

Political offices
Preceded by Carter B. Harlan	Secretary of State of Ohio; 1840–1841	Succeeded by John Sloane
Preceded by Henry W. King	Secretary of State of Ohio; 1852–1856	Succeeded by James H. Baker
