= Dog walking =

Act of a person walking with a dog

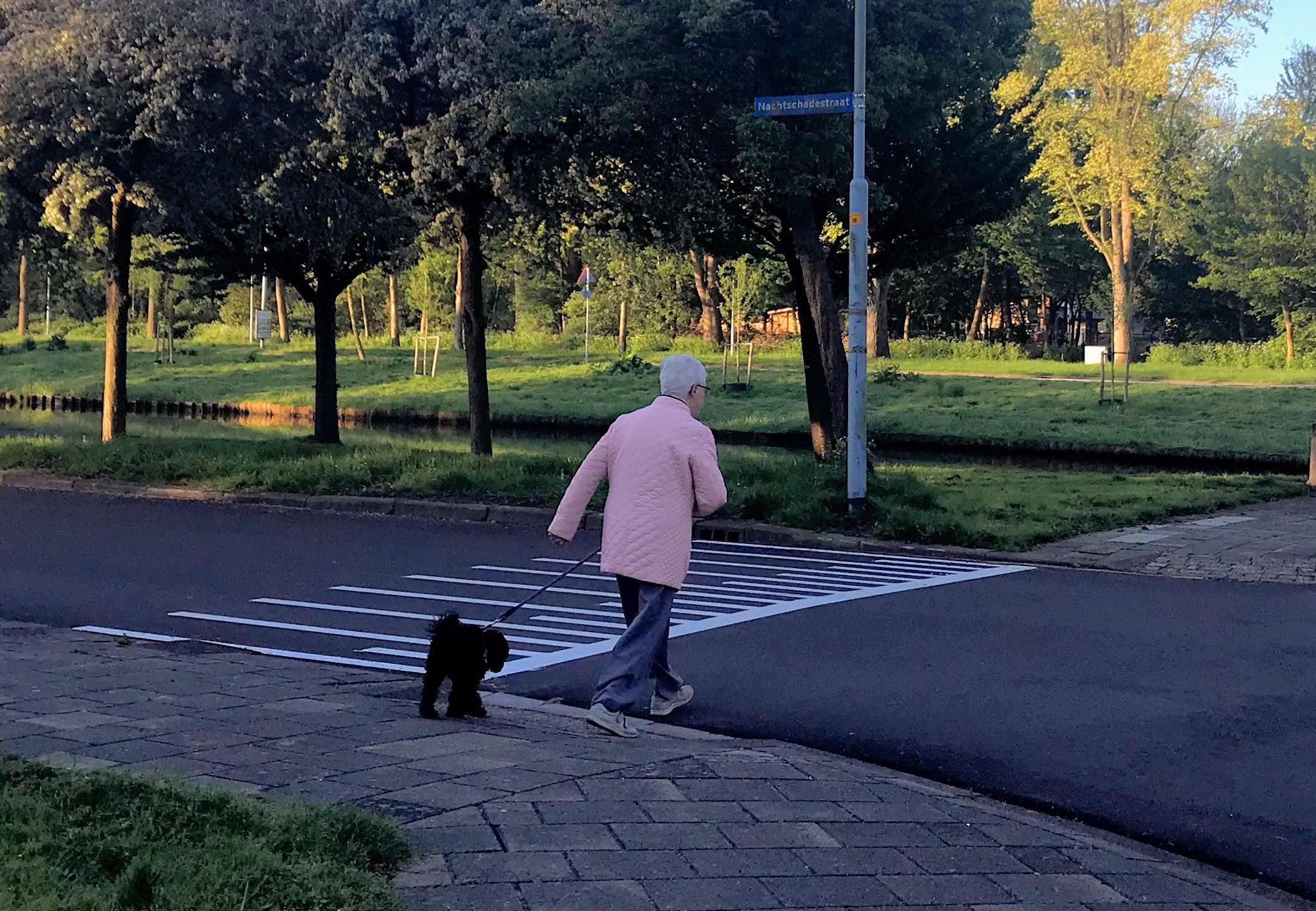
A woman walking her dog

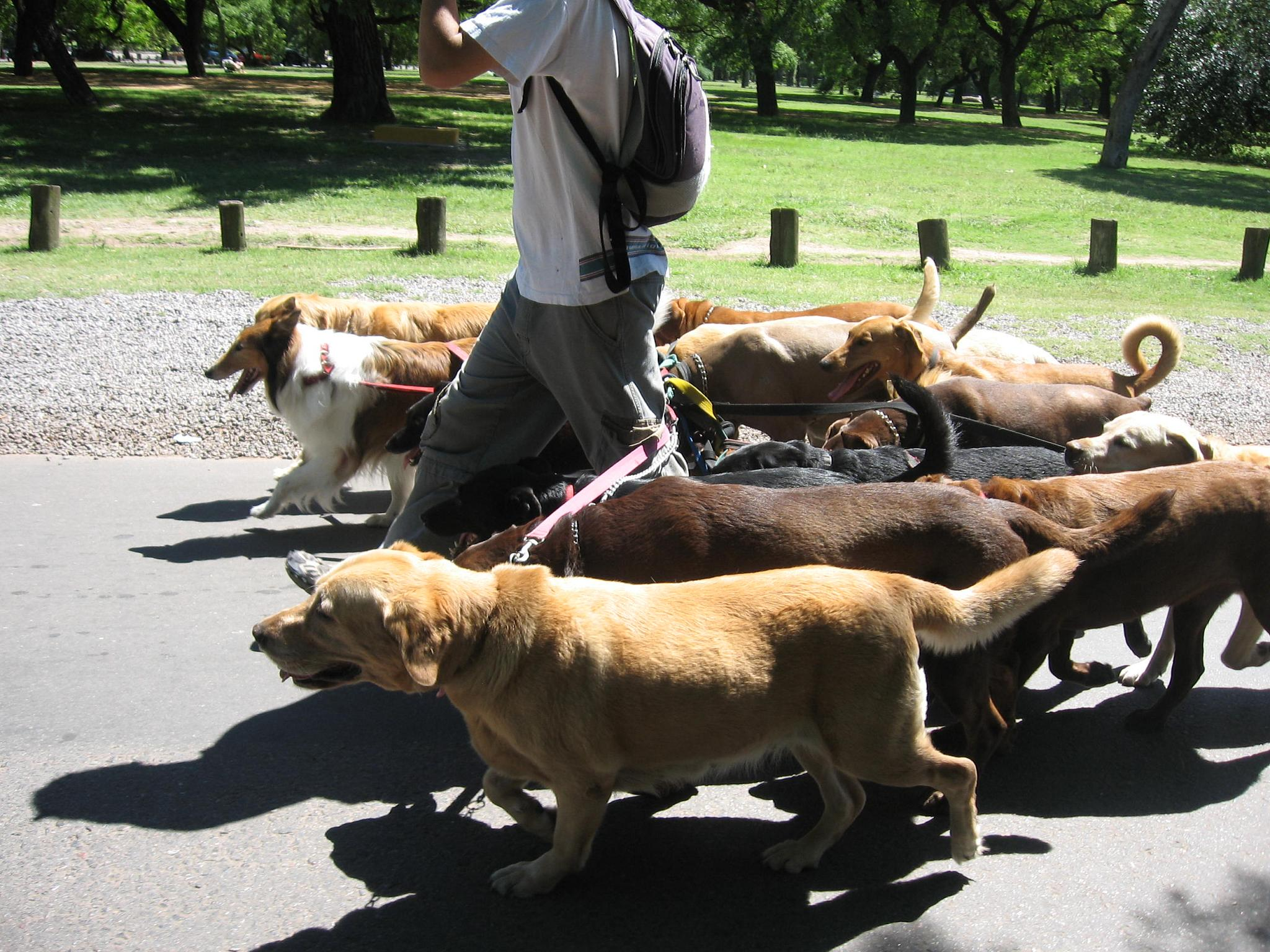
A dog walking service

A professional dog walker in Tokyo

Dog walking, also known as walkies, is the act of a person walking with a dog, typically from the dog's residence and then returning. Leashes are commonly used for this. Both owners and pets receive many benefits, including exercise and companionship.

== Description ==
Dogs are restrained by a collar around their neck or a harness, or by simply following their guardian with familiarity and verbal control. Commonly, the dog is walked by the guardian or another family member, but there are also professional dog walkers.

Dog owners can also go hiking with their dogs. Many trails mandate that the dogs are on leash, in view of the dogs' safety and the safety of other hikers.

== Health benefits ==
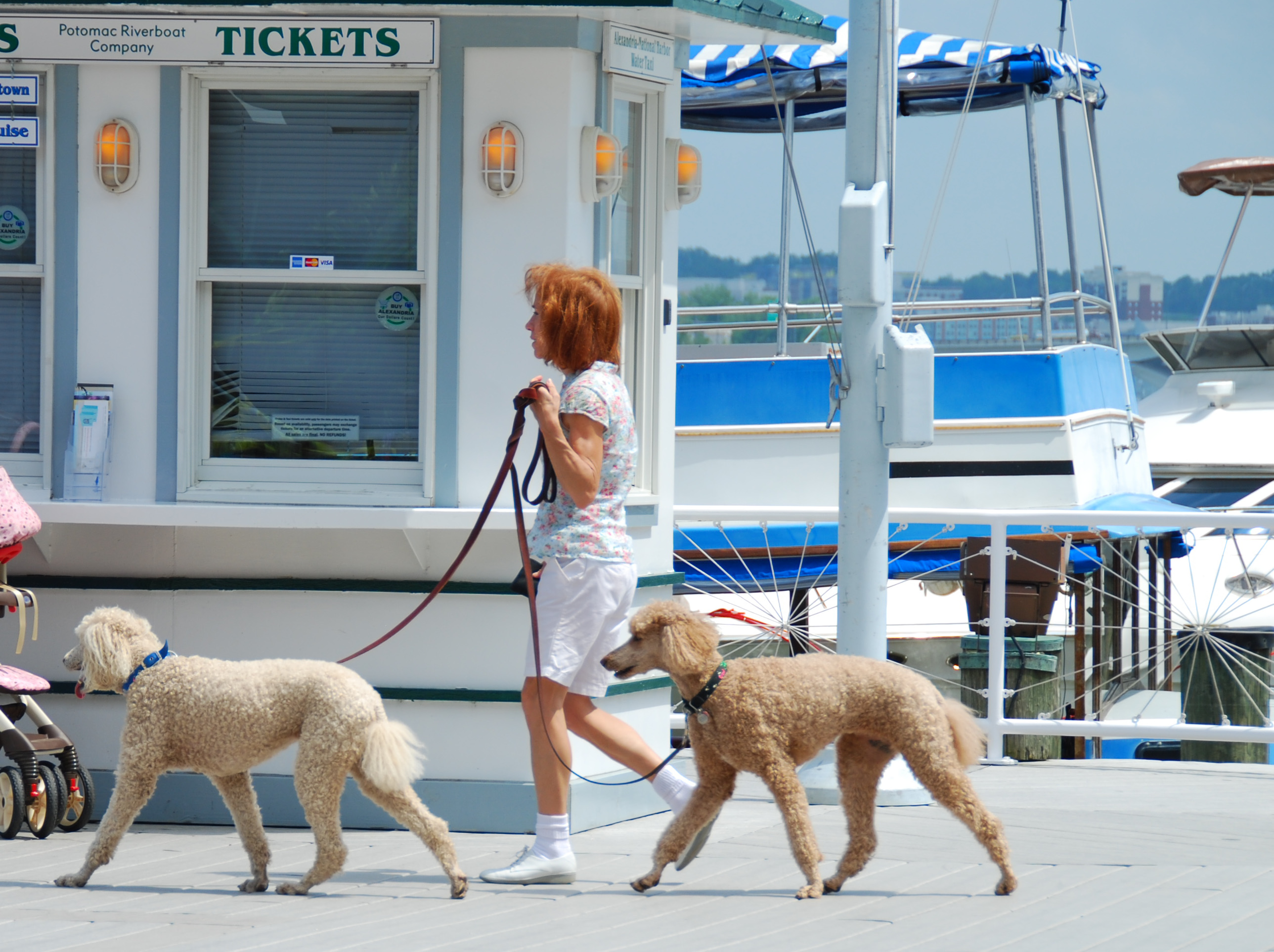
Two dogs being walked along the waterfront

A study by Michigan State University showed that people who walk their dogs are 34% more likely to meet expected goals of exercise, with a recommended level of 150 minutes of activity such as dog walking per week. Matthew Reeves, the co-author of the study said, "There is no magic bullet in getting people to reach those benchmarks but walking a dog has a measurable impact."

Research conducted by the University of Western Australia has suggested that a higher rate of dog walking within a community tends to cause more interpersonal relationships within that community. The research suggested that people in the community would acknowledge and greet other people in the street, and exchange favors with neighbors, which could possibly encourage more exercise in the community, by giving pets and owners a chance at a healthier lifestyle.

== Professional dog walkers ==
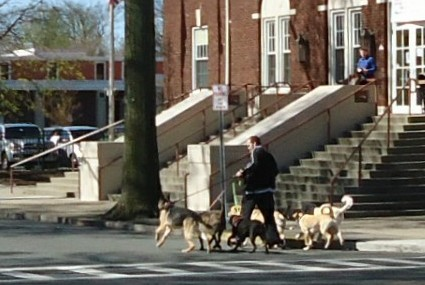
This professional dog walker on skates is pulled rapidly down a street by six dogs in Summit, New Jersey, U.S.

Professional dog walkers, both individuals and businesses, are paid by dog owners to walk their dogs for them. Some dog walkers will take many dogs for a walk at once, while others will only take a single dog. The length of a walk might vary by breed or owner's request, ranging from short walks intended to last no longer than the time it takes for the dog to relieve itself of waste, to longer walks with a specific amount of time set by the owner. "The length of walks should take into account the dog's age and health status. Long walks (over 1 hour) should not be undertaken by dogs under 12 months of age for smaller breeds, up to 18 months for large breeds, to protect their bones and joints while they are still growing." Also growing in popularity is "dog running". Dog runners are professionals who run with dogs, rather than walking with them. In some jurisdictions, dog walking businesses must be licensed and have employees trained in animal first aid. Professional dog walking services can be obtained locally or through online referral services. Obtaining a position as a professional dog walker has become more demanding, with applicants having to go through extensive training. However, whether or not licensing or training is required, all dog walkers who walk other people's dogs must be aware of best practices such as using a fixed-length leash and weather considerations.

In the United States, the first professional dog walker is believed to have been Jim Buck, who in 1960 launched his dog walking service in New York City.

=== Regulations ===
In the United Kingdom, some jurisdictions may require dog walkers to obtain business or advertising licenses. Other regulations require dog walkers to ensure dogs are under control in public spaces, dog feces are cleaned up, and the dogs are not prohibited breeds.

In the United States, local jurisdictions may have laws regulating professional dog walking, For example, in San Francisco, dog walkers must be licensed with the city, are limited to 8 dogs on leashes no longer than 2.4 m (8 ft), have liability insurance and licenses for each dog, have available drinking water and a first aid kit, and carry a cell phone.

== Contested dog walks ==
Much research outlines the benefits of dog walking for the dog and human alike, promoting mental and physical well-being and sociability. However, dogs that display aggression undermine these benefits, “extracting a considerable social and emotional toll for people”. Wild animals have been documented adjusting their distribution and activity to avoid areas frequented by dogs, which may place additional stress on wild populations in key habitats or seasons.

== Legal ==
Dog walking has been banned by the Iranian government since June 2025 in most of its cities.

== See also ==
- Pet sitting
- Pet taxi
- Dog daycare
- Dog walking in Iran
