= Henry W. King =

American politician

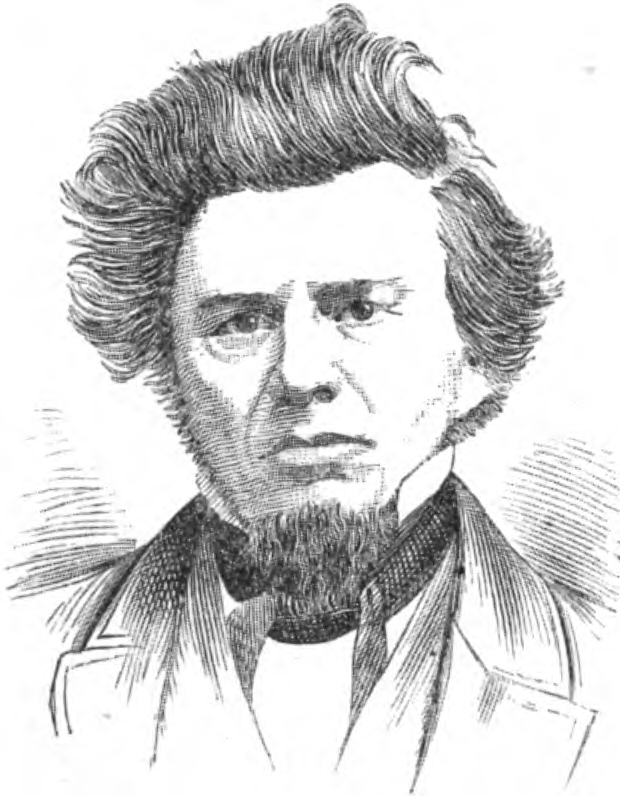

9th Ohio Secretary of State
- In office 1850–1852
- Governor: Reuben Wood
- Preceded by: Samuel Galloway
- Succeeded by: William Trevitt

Personal details
- Born: September 24, 1815 Westfield, Massachusetts
- Died: November 20, 1857 (aged 42) Akron, Ohio
- Party: Free Soil
- Spouse: Mary Crosby
- Children: Harry Crosby King, Julia Huntington
- Education: Trinity

Henry W. King (September 24, 1815 – November 20, 1857) was a Free Soil politician in the U.S. state of Ohio who served as Ohio Secretary of State 1850–1852.

== Biography ==
Henry W. King was born in 1815 in Westfield, Massachusetts, the eldest son of Judge Leicester King. He moved with his parents to Warren, Trumbull County, Ohio in 1817. King graduated from Washington (later Trinity) College in Hartford, Connecticut in 1836, and from Cincinnati Law School in 1839.

Henry W. King opened a law office in Akron, Ohio in 1839 with Milton Sutliff, and later with James D. Taylor, and in 1849 with his brother David L. King as King & King. He was married October 20, 1842 to Mary Crosby, daughter of Dr. Elaikim Crosby. Son Harry Crosby King died during the American Civil War, August 11, 1864, while in the 164th Ohio Infantry. Daughter Julia Huntington married and moved to Chicago.

King was active in promoting Akron's Union School System. In 1850 he was elected by the Ohio General Assembly as Ohio Secretary of State to a three-year term. A new constitution, adopted in summer of 1851, made the office elective, and an election was scheduled for autumn, 1851, shortening King's term to January 1852.

In the 1851 election, King came in third to Democrat William Trevitt and Whig Earl Bill. He returned to Akron after his term, and died there November 20, 1857.

Political offices
Preceded by Samuel Galloway	Secretary of State of Ohio; 1850–1852	Succeeded by William Trevitt
