= Justice Buck =

Justice Buck may refer to:

- Daniel Buck (judge) (1829–1905), associate justice of the Minnesota Supreme Court
- Horace R. Buck (1853–1897), associate justice of the Montana Supreme Court
