= Dog walking in Iran =

Law of Iran

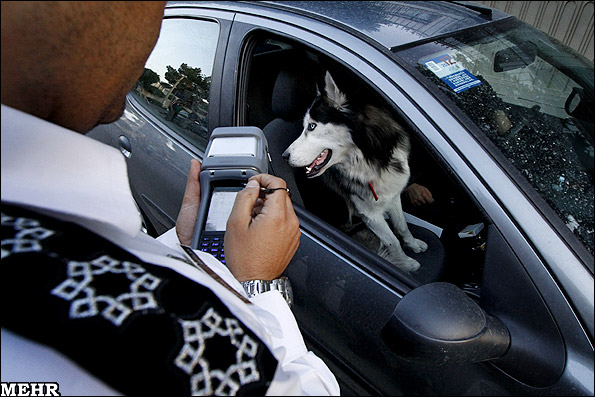
Iranian police officer fines driver for having a dog in the car (2012).

In Iran, dog walking is banned in at least 11 cities, largely due to interpretations of the country's official religion, Shia Islam. This has led to criticism, resistance, arrests, and fines from many Iranians. In some cases, municipalities in major cities like Tehran have killed dogs.

== Background ==
In Iran, there is no specific law for controlling and keeping pets, including dogs. In addition to the lack of strict rules for keeping them, dog walking has not been criminalized. The lack of culture and responsibility on the part of a large number of pet owners, not picking up waste, untying dogs, passing by or entering children's playgrounds, ignoring keeping them in apartments, the lack of strict control rules, places for their use, and dealings based on taste rather than law, are among the problems in this area.

== Rules ==
The regime's judicial system has announced a ban on dog walking in some provinces of the country. A review of the prosecutor's orders in various provinces shows that the ban will apply to public roads, parks and vehicles. Keeping dogs or pets has not been banned in general. According to statistics published by a state news agency last year, one in ten Iranians currently owns a pet. Dogs and cats are the most popular. The issue of combating dog walking through law enforcement and judicial channels is at least more than a decade old. Combating dog walking was part of the social security plan in the early 1990s. After that, this ban was announced at several points and there were confrontations, but usually the aforementioned plans do not continue. On the other hand, the increase in keeping pets over the past 15 years shows that these plans do not necessarily lead to results.

== Reaction ==
=== People's complaints ===
Judicial authorities emphasize that numerous complaints from people on this issue have led to the announcement of a ban and upcoming actions. The experience of living in large cities shows that the interest of people from different social groups in keeping pets, including dogs, has increased, and many of the obvious things related to this interest are not observed by them. Personal experiences in this area also show that people's protests against each other in this regard often lead to the discomfort of the animal owner.

== See also ==
- Dog walking
