= Gilles Buck =

French sailor

Gilles Buck ( 1 March 1935 – 18 September 2010) was a French sailor who competed in the 1968 Summer Olympics.
