= Francis Baasen =

American politician (1829–1901)

Francis Bassen
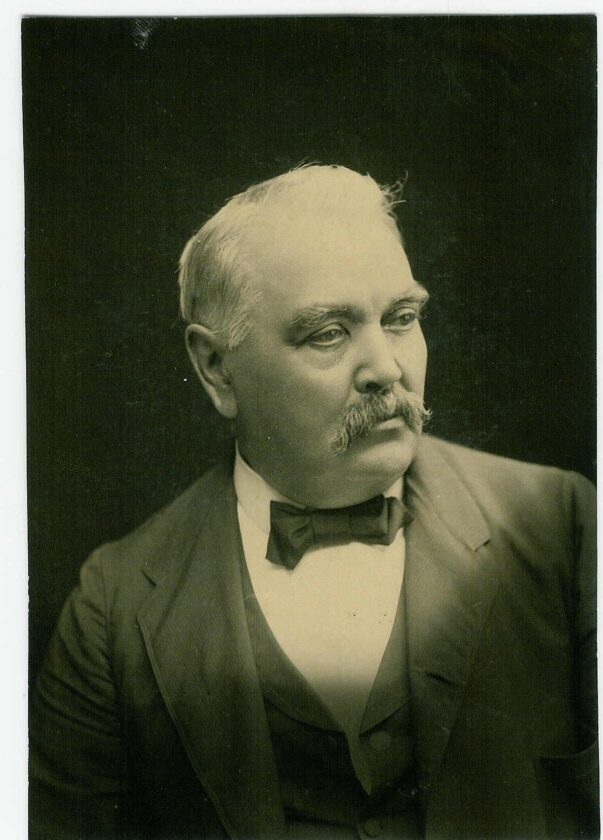

Member of the Minnesota House of Representatives from the 34th district
- In office January 7, 1873 – January 5, 1874

1st Secretary of State of Minnesota
- In office 1858–1860
- Preceded by: Office established
- Succeeded by: James H. Baker

Member of the Minnesota Territorial House of Representatives from the 10th district
- In office January 7, 1857 – December, 1857

Personal details
- Born: September 30, 1829 Luxembourg
- Died: January 10, 1901 (aged 71) Minneapolis, Minnesota, U.S.
- Resting place: New Ulm, Minnesota, U.S.
- Party: Democratic
- Occupation: Politician, lawyer

Francis Baasen (September 30, 1829 – January 10, 1901) was an American Democratic politician who served as the first Secretary of State of Minnesota from 1858 to 1860.

Born in Luxembourg, Baasen studied law in Milwaukee, Wisconsin and then moved to New Ulm, Minnesota. Baasen served in the Minnesota Territorial House of Representatives in 1857. He also served in the Minnesota Constitutional Convention of 1857. He was then elected the first Secretary of State of Minnesota and served 1858–1860. During the American Civil War, Baasen served in the 1st Minnesota Volunteer Infantry. Baasen served in the Minnesota House of Representatives in 1872. He died in Minneapolis, Minnesota.

== Notes ==
Political offices
Preceded by Incumbent	Secretary of State of Minnesota; 1858–1860	Succeeded by James H. Baker
