= James H. Baker (politician) =

American journalist and politician

James Heaton Baker
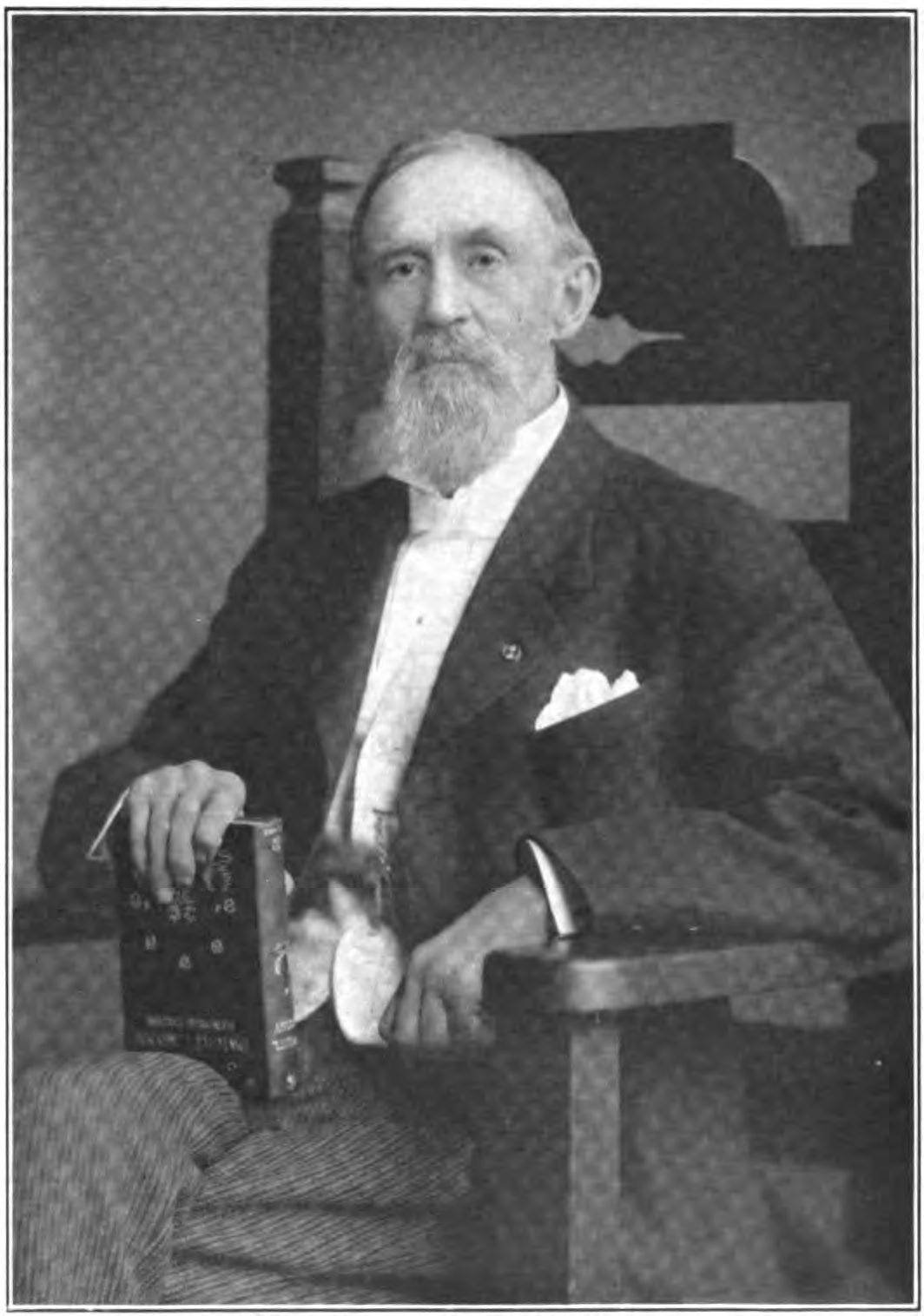
- James H. Baker, circa 1908

11th Ohio Secretary of State
- In office January 14, 1856 – January 11, 1858
- Governor: Salmon P. Chase
- Preceded by: William Trevitt
- Succeeded by: Addison P. Russell

2nd Minnesota Secretary of State
- In office 1860–1862
- Governor: Alexander Ramsey
- Preceded by: Francis Baasen
- Succeeded by: David Blakeley

Personal details
- Born: May 6, 1829 Monroe, Ohio
- Died: May 25, 1913 (aged 84) Mankato, Minnesota
- Resting place: Glenwood Cemetery, Mankato
- Party: Republican
- Education: Ohio Wesleyan University

Military service
- Allegiance: Union Army
- Years of service: 1862-1864
- Rank: Colonel; Brevet Brigadier General
- Unit: 10th Minnesota Volunteer Infantry Regiment

James Heaton Baker (May 6, 1829 – May 25, 1913) was a Republican politician who was Ohio Secretary of State from 1856 to 1858, Minnesota Secretary of State, 1860–1862, and served in the American Civil War.

== Life ==
James H. Baker was born May 6, 1829, in Monroe, Butler County, Ohio. He was educated in common schools, and graduated from Ohio Wesleyan University. He became a teacher, and had charge of the Female Seminary at Richmond, Indiana. In 1853 he purchased the Scioto Gazette in Chillicothe, Ohio. In 1855 he was elected to a single term as Ohio Secretary of State. Later in life, he would be Minnesota Secretary of State 1860–1862.

During the American Civil War, Baker served as colonel of the 10th Minnesota Volunteer Infantry in the Union Army in 1862–1863. He was appointed Provost Marshal for the Department of Missouri, and served till the close of the war. He was mustered out of the volunteers on October 21, 1865. In recognition of Baker's service, on January 13, 1866, President Andrew Johnson nominated Baker for appointment to the grade of brevet brigadier general to rank from March 13, 1865, and the U.S. Senate confirmed the appointment on March 12, 1866.

After the war, Baker was appointed Register of Public Lands at the Boonville, Missouri Federal Land Office, which he performed for two years. He then retired to a farm in Minnesota, and was appointed Commissioner of Pensions by President Grant from 1871 to 1875.

Together with Judge Lorin Cray, Baker paid for the creation of a four-ton granite marker known as the "Hanging Monument", commemorating the mass execution of 38 Dakota men in Mankato on December 26, 1862. Erected in 1912, it soon became the object of controversy and was finally removed by the City of Mankato in 1971.

Baker died at Mankato, Minnesota, May 25, 1913. He is buried at Glenwood Cemetery in Mankato.

== Electoral history ==
=== 1859 ===
1859 Minnesota Secretary of State election
Party	Candidate	Votes	%
Republican	James H. Baker	20,732	53.47
Democratic	Francis Baasen (incumbent)	18,039	46.53
Total votes		38,771	100.00
Republican gain from Democratic			

=== 1861 ===
1861 Minnesota Secretary of State election
Party	Candidate	Votes	%
Republican	James H. Baker (incumbent)	16,035	60.12
Democratic	Daniel Buck	10,589	39.70
Write-in		44	0.16
Write-in	Eli B. (E.B.) Ames	3	0.01
Write-in	H.C. Hoffman	1	0.00
Write-in	C.P. Fischer	1	0.00
Total votes		26,673	100.00
Republican hold			

== Publications ==
- Baker, James H. (1908). Minnesota Historical Society Collections, Lives of the Governors of Minnesota. Vol. 13. St. Paul.

== Notes ==
Political offices
Preceded by William Trevitt	Secretary of State of Ohio; 1858–1860	Succeeded by Addison P. Russell
Preceded by Francis Baasen	Secretary of State of Minnesota; 1860–1862	Succeeded by David Blakeley
