= Florence Buck =

American religious leader (1860–1925)

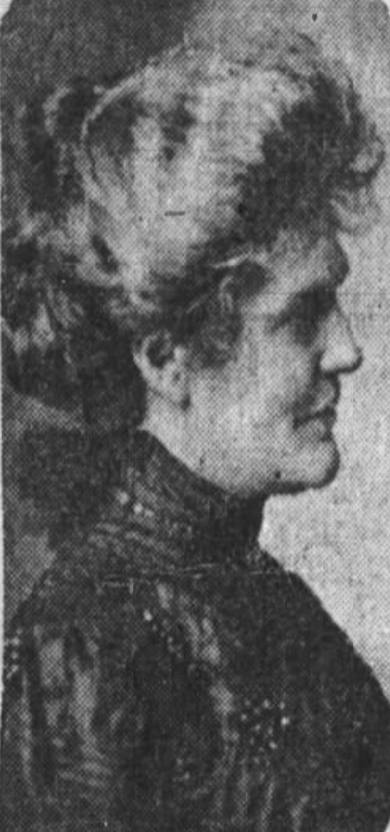
- Florence Buck, from a 1912 newspaper
- Born: July 19, 1860; Battle Creek, Michigan, U.S.
- Died: October 12, 1925 (aged 65); Boston, Massachusetts, U.S.
- Occupations: Educator, suffragist, minister
- Partner: Marion Murdock

Florence Buck (July 19, 1860 – October 12, 1925) was an American educator, suffragist, and minister. She was an ordained Unitarian pastor and worked alongside her partner, fellow Unitarian pastor Marion Murdoch. She was on the national staff of the American Unitarian Association (AUA) from 1912 to 1925.

== Early life and education ==
Buck was born in Battle Creek, Michigan, the daughter of Samuel Pearse Buck and Lucy Reasoner Buck. She was raised in the Kalamazoo home of her uncle, George M. Buck. She graduated from Kalamazoo College and trained for ministry at Meadville Theological School in Pennsylvania. with further studies at Manchester College, Oxford. She was ordained in 1893, at All Souls Church in Chicago, during the Parliament of the World's Religions. Antoinette Brown Blackwell attended Buck's ordination ceremony, and Jenkin Lloyd Jones presided.

== Career ==
Buck taught high school science, and was a school principal in Michigan as a young woman. From 1894 to 1899, Buck and her partner, Marion Murdoch, were co-pastors at the First Unitarian Church (Unity Church) in Cleveland, Ohio. They also opened a free kindergarten and founded clubs for boys and girls. Later she wrote, "I think it takes two persons to make one good pastor. We find that we can accomplish more good by working together than either could do by assuming all the responsibility of church work alone."

From 1901 to 1910, Buck was pastor of a Unitarian church in Kenosha, Wisconsin. In 1910, she was temporary pastor of a church in Palo Alto, California, and from 1911 to 1912, she served a church in Alameda, California.

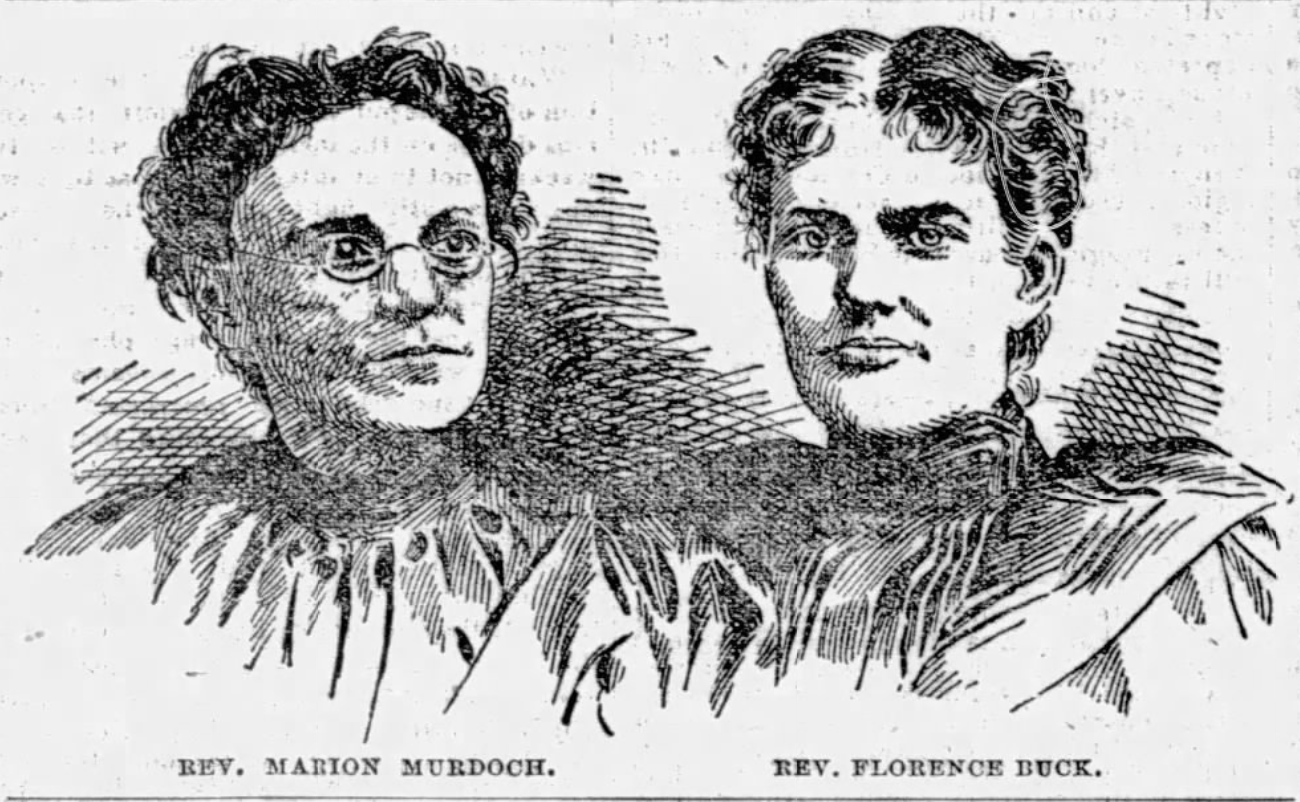
Marion Murdoch and Florence Buck, in an 1894 newspaper

She moved to Boston, and was an executive of the AUA Department of Religious Education from 1912 to 1925. She edited The Beacon, a religious instruction magazine, and The Beacon Hymnal, wrote for other denominational publications, and ran summer institutes for teachers. She preached at Unitarian churches and events in New England in her last years, including at Boston's King's Chapel.

Buck and Murdoch both spoke at the 1898 convention of the National American Woman Suffrage Association (NAWSA). Buck was the first woman awarded an honorary Doctor of Divinity degree at Meadville Theological School, in 1920, and in 1923. She served on the council of the Religious Education Association. "She has given her own enthusiastic self most unreservedly, and it would be a dull, damp fire that would not be kindled by her presence," reported The Pacific Unitarian in 1920, about her speaking tour of California that year.

== Publications ==
- The Story of Jesus: A Manual for Religious Instruction in the Intermediate Grades (1917)
- "Religious Education for Democracy" (1919)
- "A Unified Educational Program" (1924)
- "Can We Have an Intelligence Test in Morals and Religion?" (1924)

== Personal life and legacy ==
Buck had a long personal and professional partnership with fellow Unitarian pastor Marion Murdoch. Buck died in Boston, from typhoid fever, at the age of 65. Caroline Bartlett Crane and Ella Lyman Cabot were among the prominent colleagues who wrote published tributes after Buck's death.
