= E. C. Buck =

American politician and minister (1852–1925)

Personal details
- Born: March 21, 1852 near Abingdon, Virginia, U.S.
- Died: February 24, 1925 (aged 72) near Abingdon, Virginia, U.S.
- Resting place: near Abingdon, Virginia, U.S.
- Children: Fred C. Buck
- Occupation: Politician; minister

Ephraim C. Buck (March 21, 1852 – February 24, 1925) was an American politician and minister from Virginia. He served as a member of the Virginia House of Delegates for 10 years.

Buck was born, near Abingdon, Virginia. He served in the Virginia House of Delegates, representing Washington County and Bristol, for 10 years. He was chairman of the committee on counties, towns and cities and was minister of the Christian Church for 50 years.

Buck married and had several children, including Fred C., E. C. Jr., Lucius A., Mrs. Robert C. Bradford and Mrs. Ray Patterson. His son Fred also served in the Virginia House of Delegates. Buck died on February 24, 1925, at his home near Abingdon. He was buried in the family cemetery at Bethany, near Abingdon.
