= Jim Buck (dog walker) =

American professional dog walker

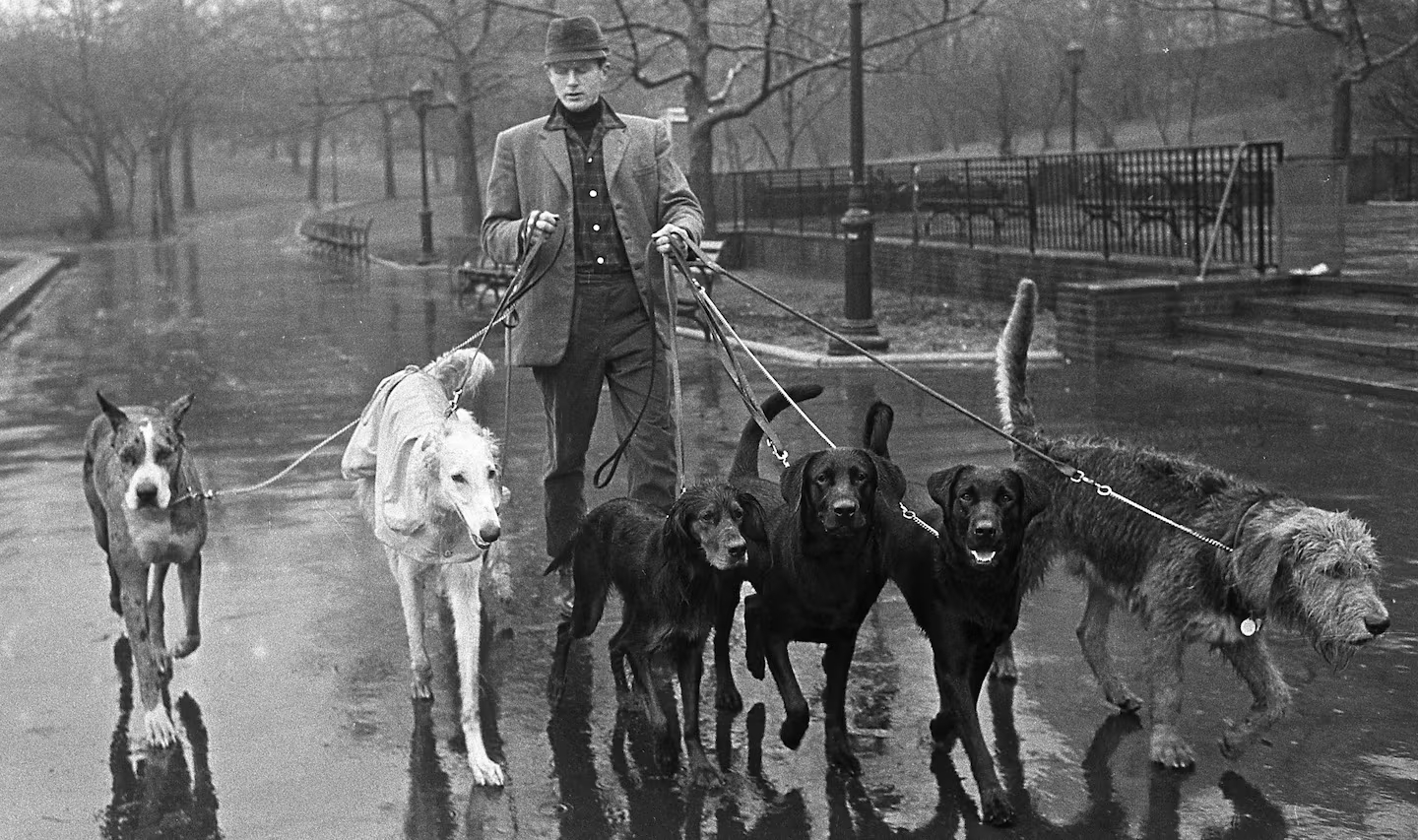
Buck in 1964, walking six dogs in Central Park

Jim Buck (28 November 1931 – 4 July 2013) was a New York City dog walker from 1960 to the mid 1990s, and was reportedly the first person in the United States with the profession.

James Augustine Farrell Buck was born into a prominent Manhattan family with wealth from the banking and shipping industries. He had a successful, $15,000-salary career in electronics sales. He quit this job in 1960 at age 32 because it bored him, and became a full-time dog walker on the Upper East Side, walking as many as 40 dogs per day. The profession was largely unheard of, and Buck's career as a "dog walker" made international headlines. Buck became a well-recognized figure in the neighborhood, where he offered training services and canine consultations as well. By 1964, Jim Buck’s School for Dogs was earning as much as $500 per week, and he hired his first assistant. Buck operated the business for more than forty years, and hired at least 24 assistants at its peak.

On July 4, 2013, Buck died in Manhattan from complications of emphysema and cancer.
