= Fred Buck =

English footballer (1879–1952)

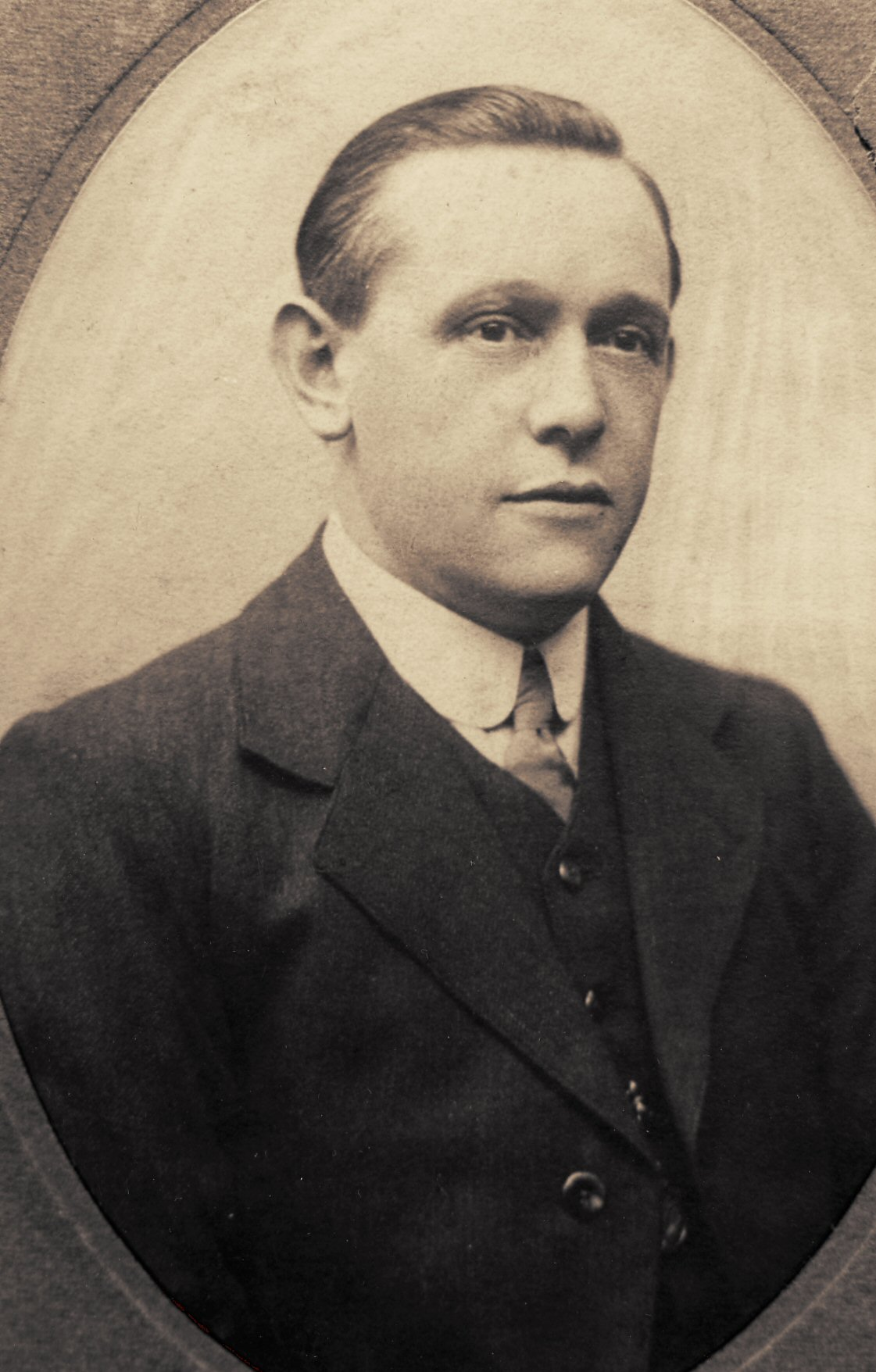

Personal information
- Full name: Frederick Richard Buck
- Date of birth: 2 November 1879
- Place of birth: Audley, England
- Date of death: 5 June 1952 (aged 72)
- Place of death: Stafford, England
- Height: 5 ft 6 1/2 in (1.69 m)
- Positions: Inside forward; centre half

Youth career
- 1895–1897: Stafford Wesleyans

Senior career*
Years	Team	Apps	(Gls)
1897–1900	Stafford Rangers	?	(?)
1900–1903	West Bromwich Albion	22	(6)
1903–1904	Liverpool	13	(1)
1904–1906	Plymouth Argyle	92	(40)
1906–1914	West Bromwich Albion	287	(90)
1914–1917	Swansea Town	8	(1)
- * Club domestic league appearances and goals

Frederick Richard Buck (2 November 1879 – 5 June 1952), better known as Fred Buck, was an English footballer who played as an inside forward and centre half. He played in the Football League for West Bromwich Albion and Liverpool, and the Southern League for Plymouth Argyle and Swansea Town.

== Life and career ==
Buck was born in Audley, Staffordshire. He joined Stafford Wesleyans in August 1895, moving on to Stafford Rangers in July 1897. In November 1900 he signed for West Bromwich Albion before a move to Liverpool in May 1903. Buck was signed by Plymouth Argyle in January 1904, then re-joined West Bromwich Albion in April 1906. Buck was Albion's top league goalscorer in the 1907–08 season, scoring 18 times, and again in 1909–10 when he found the net on 16 occasions. In May 1914 he moved to Swansea Town, where he finished his career, scoring one goal in eight league appearances. He retired in May 1917.

Buck's parents were Richard Samuel Buck (1839–1909) and Harriet Johnson (1840–1910). He appeared in the 1881 census in Alsagers Bank, and in the 1891, 1901 and 1911 censuses in Stafford. In the 1901 census he was an apprentice fitter, and in the 1911 census he was described as an engineer fitter. During his time with Plymouth Argyle, he was described as being 5 foot 6 1/2 inches tall and barely 11 stone. In July 1913, he resided in Stafford and he married Stella Margaret Williams on 15 July 1913. In the First World War, from 1915 to 1918, he served in the Army Service Corps where he gained the British War Medal. In 1918, he was resident in Cramer Street, Stafford. From 1921 to 1931 he was a publican in Rugby, Warwickshire at the Victoria Inn, 1 Lower Hillmorton Road. Between 1945 and 1952 he was a clerk in the Grinding Wheel Works in Stafford. He died in Stafford on 5 June 1952, and is buried in the Eccleshall Road Cemetery.
