= Bill Buck (cricketer) =

English cricketer

Personal information
- Full name: William Dalton Buck
- Born: 30 September 1946 (age 80); Southampton, Hampshire, England
- Batting: Right-handed
- Bowling: Right-arm medium

Domestic team information
- Years: Team
- 1969: Somerset
- 1969: Hampshire

Career statistics
Competition	First-class
Matches	2
Runs scored	11
Batting average	5.50
100s/50s	–/–
Top score	6
Balls bowled	264
Wickets	2
Bowling average	67.50
5 wickets in innings	–
10 wickets in match	–
Best bowling	2/54
Catches/stumpings	–/–
- Source: Cricinfo, 8 December 2009

William Dalton Buck (born 30 September 1946) is a former English first-class cricketer.

Buck was born in the Southampton suburb of Portswood in September 1946. He was educated at Clayesmore School and later St Luke's College. Buck represented both Hampshire and Somerset in 1969. He made his first-class debut, playing for Somerset in June 1969, against the touring West Indians at Taunton. In this match, he took his only wickets in first-class cricket, dismissing Test cricketers Roy Fredericks and Joey Carew. Two months later, he represented Hampshire against the touring New Zealanders at Southampton. He remains the only cricketer to play against two different touring teams in the same season, for two different counties. He would not feature in first-class cricket again and would later lament how he wished he had been allowed to pursue a first-class career with Somerset, where he saw more opportunities. However, Hampshire, having recently released Graham Roope to Surrey, were reluctant to release Buck. Following his eventual release by Hampshire, he largely gave up playing the game and moved into a teaching career. Despite having largely given up playing the game, he did achieve his advanced coaching certificate.
