= Frederick Buck (miniaturist) =

Frederick Buck (Miniaturist)
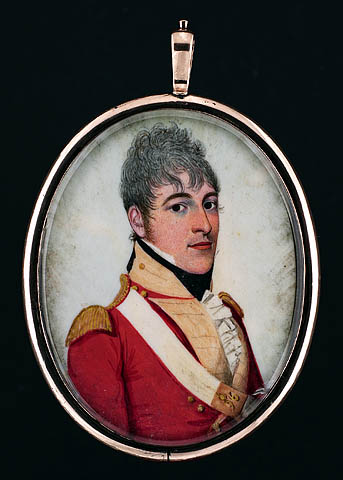
- Unidentified Officer of the 96th Regiment, Attributed to Frederick Buck
- Born: 1771; Cork, Ireland
- Died: 1840 (aged 68–69); Cork
- Known for: Miniature portrait painting

Frederick Buck (1771–1840) was an Irish miniature portrait artist active during the late 18th and early 19th centuries. Born in Cork, Ireland, Buck is best known for his miniatures. His work was in high demand among the Anglo-Irish gentry and military officers stationed in Ireland. His miniatures are considered exemplary of the art form in Ireland, a tradition that flourished especially during the Romantic period's appreciation for fine portraiture.

== Early life and career ==
Buck was born in 1771 in Cork, Ireland. He studied at the Royal Dublin Society’s drawing school starting in 1783 and began his active career around 1787. While his brother Adam Buck moved to London in 1795, Frederick remained in Cork, where he became well known for his miniature portraits of military officers and other prominent figures. During the Napoleonic Wars, his miniatures were especially sought after by soldiers traveling through Cork on their way to the Continent for the Peninsular War (1807–1814).

== Artistic style and techniques ==
Buck was celebrated for his use of watercolor on ivory, a standard medium for miniatures, which allowed for vibrant color and fine detail. His portraits are marked by a meticulous attention to facial expression, a soft color palette, and a careful rendering of the subject's attire and hair, often capturing the fashion of the period. His work often included delicate details and demonstrated an ability to capture personality within the constraints of the small format. Buck’s miniatures were often oval in shape, fitted into lockets, brooches or small frames, making them ideal for personal keepsakes.

== Legacy and death ==
Buck continued to paint miniatures up until his death around 1839 or 1840. His works are still sought after and have been preserved in private collections and institutions, illustrating the enduring appeal of his artistry. Some of his portraits remain important artifacts in studies of Anglo-Irish society and military history, providing insight into the personal lives of individuals during a transformative era in Irish and British history.

== Selected collections ==
Examples of Buck’s work can be found in the collections of the National Gallery of Ireland and the Victoria and Albert Museum, which house some of the finest Irish miniatures from the period. These institutions recognise Buck's contributions to the field and showcase his work as part of the larger Irish artistic heritage.
