= William Buck (translator) =

American translator of Sanskrit epic poems

William Benson Buck (April 20, 1934 – August 26, 1970) was an American writer who produced novelized translations of the Sanskrit epic poems Mahabharata and Ramayana in English. A translation of Harivamsa was unfinished at his death.

== Biography ==
Buck was born in Washington, D.C., one of six children of U.S. Congressman Frank H. Buck. He had a sister and four half-siblings. He was a member of the wealthy Buck family of Marin County, California. His great-grandfather was Leonard W. Buck, a politician and businessman. His father died in Washington, D.C., in 1942 while still in office. His mother, Eva Benson Buck, was born to Swedish parents and was Buck's second wife. After her husband's death, she moved back to Vacaville, California with William and his younger sister Carol Franc Buck, who grew up at the family's mansion at 225 Buck Ave.

According to the publisher's preface to the 2012 republication of Buck's translations of Mahabharata and Ramayana, Buck was in 1955 inspired by reading a 19th-century translation of Bhagavad Gita, in a state library in Carson City, Nevada. He discovered that a proposed 11-volume Indian publication of Mahabharata was at risk for lack of funds, and subsidized it. He began to study Sanskrit, and to make his own translations. He later wrote:

My method in writing both Mahabharata and Ramayana was to begin with a literal translation from which to extract the story, and then to tell that story in an interesting way which would preserve the spirit and flavor of the original.

Buck's translations have been praised by Levi Asher (Note: Third-party comments on Asher Levi's article should be treated with great caution. Many are poorly sourced or unsourced; some may have thought that a serious post which happened to have been made on April Fools' Day was a hoax, and tried to expand on it.) and others.

In 1961, he was sued for paternity by Jane Hammer Buck, who had lived with Buck "as husband and wife" in Bolinas, California, for six years. She stated that William acknowledged paternity of the boy, Paul Buck, who was born in San Francisco in 1958, but was seeking monthly child support payments.

== Publications ==
- Buck, William (June 12, 2012) [1967]. Mahabharata (3rd ed.). University of California Press. ISBN 9780520227040.
- Buck, William (June 12, 2012) [1967]. Ramayana (35th Anniversary ed.). University of California Press. ISBN 9780520272989.
