= William Buck (baseball) =

American baseball player and umpire

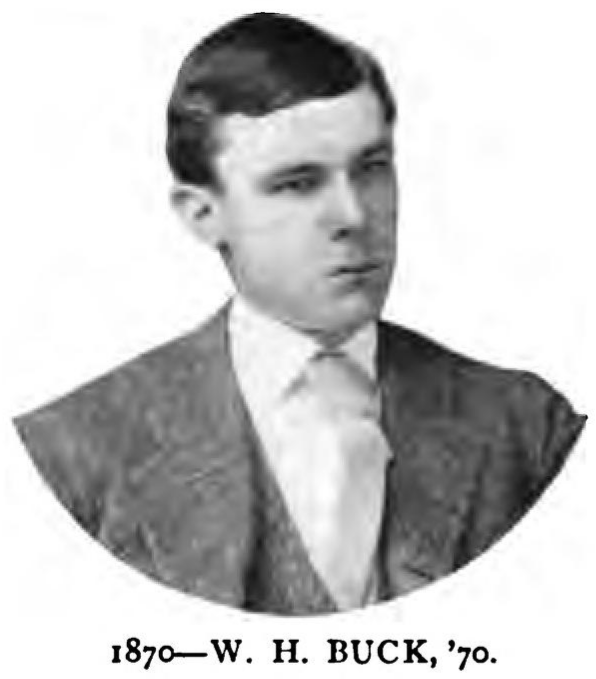
- W. H. Buck, 1870 Captain of the Princeton baseball team
- Born: William F. Buck
- Died: June 11, 1890; Boston, Massachusetts, U.S.
- Resting place: Green Mount Cemetery
- Occupations: Baseball player and umpire
- Years active: 1866–1871
- Employer: National Association

William F. Henley Buck (died June 10, 1890) was an American professional baseball player and umpire.

== Early life ==
Buck was the son of John M. and Mary B. and had a sister. His university preparation was at St. Timothy's Hall in Catonsville, Maryland, and his undergrad study was at Princeton University, where he graduated in 1870. He then did post-graduate study in medicine for two years at the University of Maryland. He was a Presbyterian and did not marry.

== At Princeton ==
He was a member of the Princeton University's Nassau Baseball Club first nine (starting lineup) in the 1866–67 season as a shortstop. The team was also known as the Pickwick Nine, playing under that name because the faculty refused to allow them to leave campus for some games. In 1867–68 he played at third base, left field, and second base. The team became known as the Princeton University Baseball Club in 1868–69. That year he remained listed as third baseman for the first nine, again occasionally playing at second. In 1869–70 he was made captain and played center field, but also played shortstop, second base, and even catcher. Buck graduated in 1870, and in 1871 moved back to his home of Baltimore. He continued to be involved in amateur baseball. In May, 1871 he was the umpire of a game between Harvard and Brown.

== Career ==
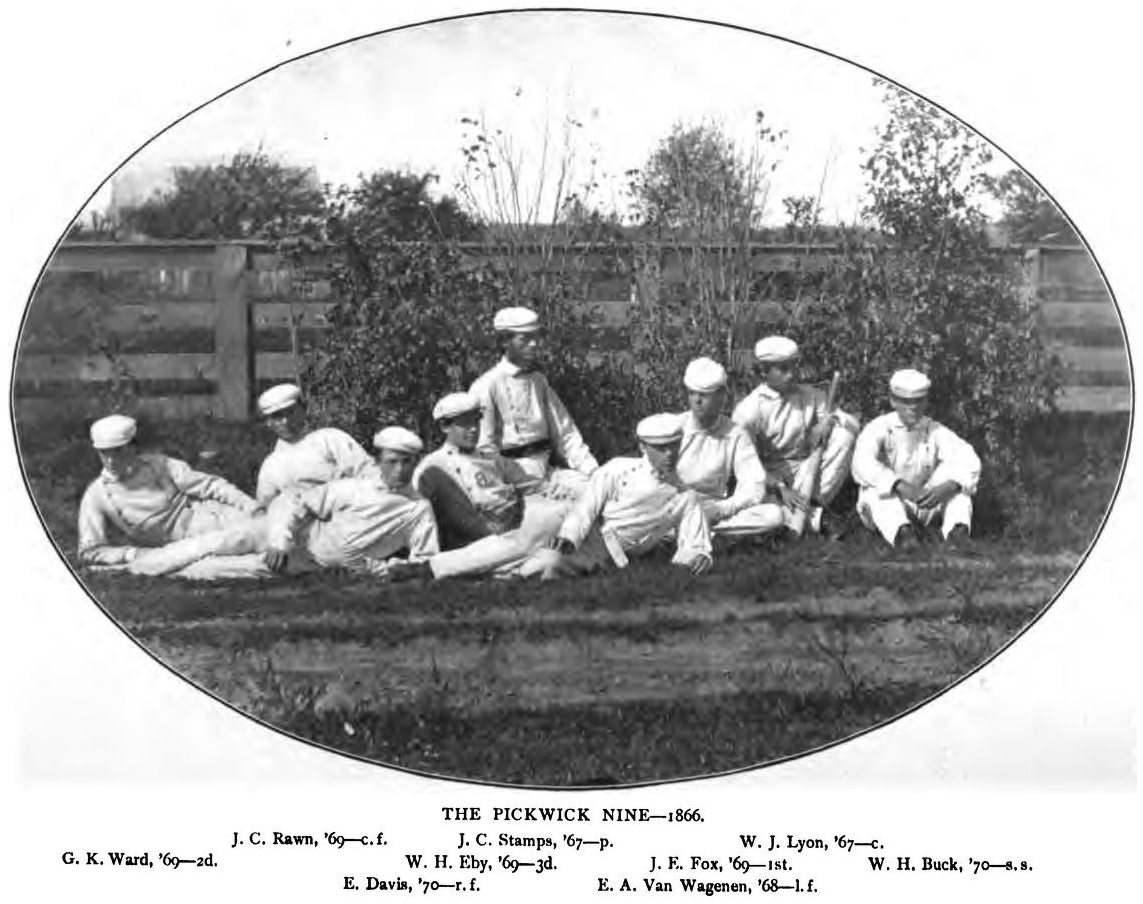
Princeton's Pickwick Nine in 1866, Buck is on far right.

In Baltimore, he joined the local team, the Baltimore Pastime Club, playing in games against the Philadelphia Athletic Club, and the Olympics of Washington, DC. In October 1871, he played in a game which was arranged to as a benefit to support victims of the Great Chicago Fire. Buck also umpired two National Association games in 1871, as the home plate umpire in both games. He also played for the Baltimore Marylands and Baltimore Enterprise clubs.

== Death ==
Buck died June 10, 1890, in Boston, Massachusetts and was buried in Greenmount Cemetery in Baltimore.
