= Fred C. Buck =

American politician and banker (died 1964)

Member of the Virginia House of Delegates from the Washington County and Bristol district
- In office 1956–1963

Personal details
- Born: Washington County, Virginia, U.S.
- Died: March 1, 1964 (aged 71) Abingdon, Virginia, U.S.
- Resting place: Knollkreg Memorial Park
- Spouse: Nattie Newell Dyer
- Children: 1
- Parent: E. C. Buck (father)
- Education: Emory and Henry College
- Alma mater: Milligan College
- Occupation: Politician; banker

Fred Carlyle Buck (June 22, 1892 – March 1, 1964) was an American politician and banker from Virginia. He served as a member of the Virginia House of Delegates from 1956 to 1963.

== Early life ==
Fred C. Buck was born in Washington County, Virginia, to Reverend Ephraim C. Buck. His father was a member of the Virginia House of Delegates. Buck attended Emory and Henry College and graduated from Milligan College.

== Career ==
Buck served with the Coast Artillery during World War I. After he was discharged, he worked in Glade Spring Bank and later served as its executive vice president. He also worked as a school teacher and was selected as principal of Woodstock High School in Abingdon.

Buck served as a member of the Virginia House of Delegates, representing Washington County and Bristol, from 1956 to 1963. He was co-author of legislation that merged and expanded Virginia banks.

Buck was vice president of Farmer's National Exchange Bank. He was elected as president of the bank in January 1942. In 1963, the bank merged with the Virginia National Bank and he served as senior vice president. He was a member of the board of trustees of Johnston Memorial Hospital and Emory and Henry College. He was a member of the board of trustees of the Holston Methodist Conference.

== Personal life ==
Buck married Nattie Newell Dyer. They had a daughter, Dorothy. He was a member of Abingdon Methodist Church.

In 1961, Buck was hospitalized for a breathing operation during his service as a delegate. Buck died on March 1, 1964, aged 71, at Johnston Memorial Hospital in Abingdon. He was buried in Knollkreg Memorial Park.
