= Bill Buck (footballer) =

Australian rules footballer (1900–1980)

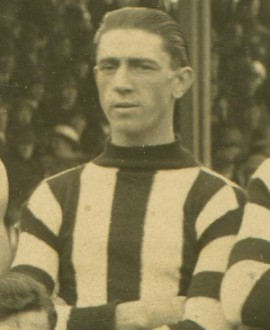
- Buck in 1922

Personal information
- Full name: Walter William Paul Buck
- Born: 4 March 1900; Hawthorn, Victoria
- Died: 20 October 1980 (aged 80); Toorak, Victoria
- Original team: Camberwell
- Height: 180 cm (5 ft 11 in)
- Weight: 76 kg (168 lb)

Playing career^{1}
Years	Club	Games (Goals)
1920–24	Collingwood	32 (1)
- ^{1} Playing statistics correct to the end of 1924.

Walter William Paul Buck (4 March 1900 – 20 October 1980) was an Australian rules footballer who played with Collingwood in the Victorian Football League (VFL).

In October 1918, aged 18 and a half, Buck enlisted to serve in World War I but the war ended before he was mobilised and he never actively served.
