= Bill Buck (environmentalist) =

American journalist

Bill Buck is an American environmentalist, writer, and multimedia producer. In 1987, he was awarded the Presidential Environmental Youth Award by President Ronald Reagan for his efforts to inform the public about a toxic waste dump in his local Casmalia, California.

Taking a Stand Against Environmental Pollution profiled Buck's achievements as a youth activist during this time, including his participation in a number of controversial protests with the direct action organization Greenpeace. In 1989, as public pressure continued to build, the dump was permanently shut down. The site was later administered by the Environmental Protection Agency and remains on the list of Superfund sites in California.

Buck began writing about environmental issues for The New York Times Special Feature Syndicate and national publications like "E" Magazine, including in-depth interviews with David R. Brower and other environmental leaders.

He combined his expertise in journalism and multimedia production in 1997, working on President Bill Clinton's official Inauguration Day webcast in Washington, DC. Buck's credits in professional TV and film production include the MTV environmental documentary Connect (1997), the film Memoirs of a Geisha (2005), the PBS series Remaking American Medicine (2006) and The Story of Stuff animated series.

In 2013, Buck published a book about San Francisco, California documenting unique aspects of the city. He writes for and publishes a website profiling America's National Trails System.
