= Daniel Buck (judge) =

American judge (1829–1905)

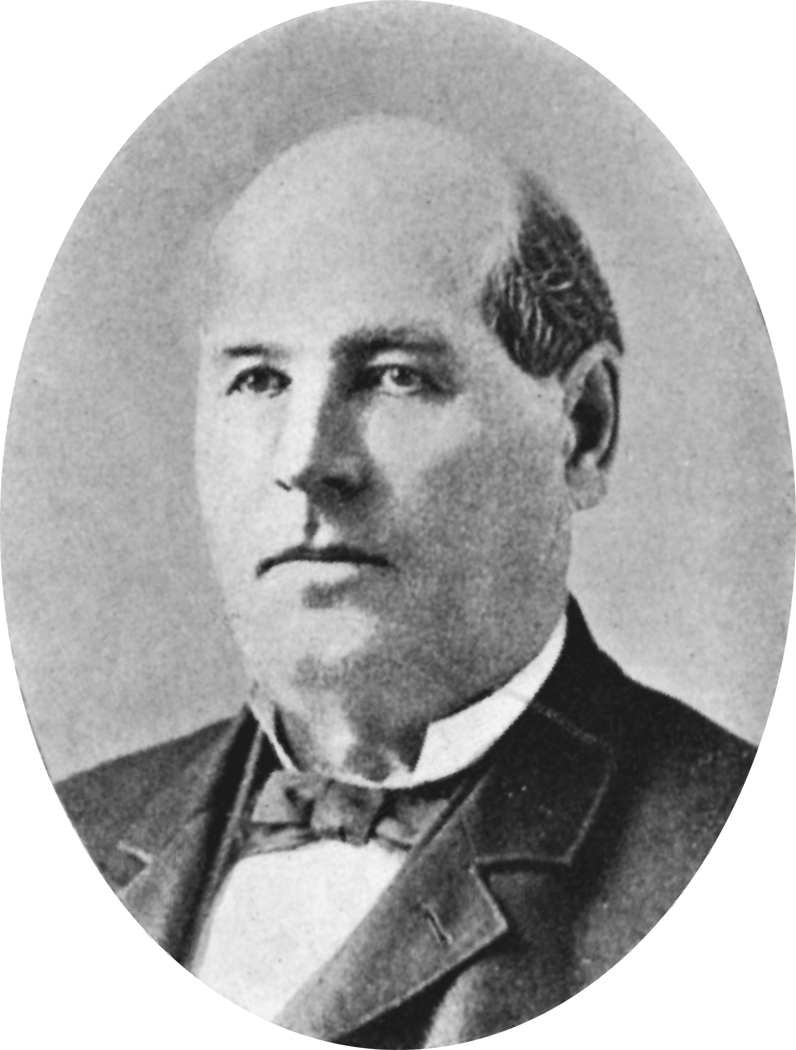

Associate Justice of the Minnesota Supreme Court
- In office 1894–1899
- Appointed by: Knute Nelson

Member of the Minnesota Senate
- In office 1879–1883

Member of the Minnesota House of Representatives
- In office 1866

Personal details
- Born: September 28, 1829 Boonville, New York, U.S.
- Died: May 21, 1905 (aged 75) Mankato, Minnesota, U.S.
- Party: Democratic
- Education: New York Law School

Daniel Buck (September 28, 1829 – May 21, 1905) was an American attorney, politician, and jurist.

== Early life and education ==
Born in Boonville, New York, Buck studied law at New York Law School and was admitted to the New York State Bar Association.

== Career ==
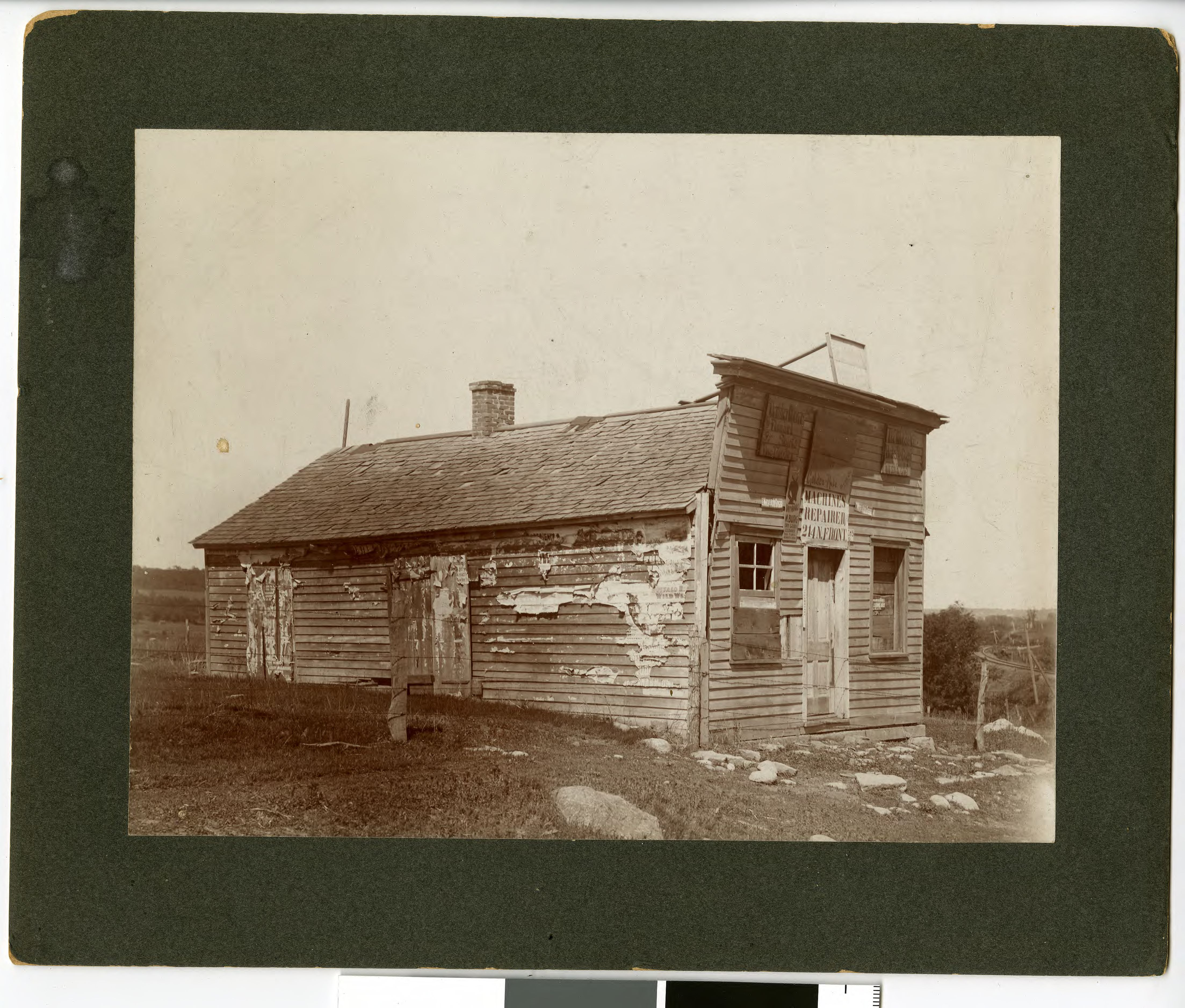
Daniel Buck former law office building, Blue Earth County, Minnesota

Buck moved to Minnesota Territory in 1857 and eventually settled in the area that became Mankato, Minnesota. He was on hand to witness the aftermath of the final climactic battle between the Dakota and Ojibwe tribes at the Battle of Shakopee in 1858. Buck was a central figure in the founding of the Village of Mankato, the Mankato Normal School, and the Mankato Area Chamber of Commerce. In 1866, Buck served in the Minnesota House of Representatives as a Democrat and then served in the Minnesota Senate from 1879 to 1883. Buck also served on the Minnesota State Normal School Board and Mankato School Board. Buck was an associate justice of the Minnesota Supreme Court from 1894 until 1899 when he resigned due to his wife's ill health. In 1904, Buck published his book on the Indian troubles in Minnesota, especially for the Spirit Lake actions. He intended his book Indian Outbreaks to be a judicially impartial account.

== Personal life ==
Buck died in Mankato, Minnesota.
