= Battle of Brown's Ferry =

Battle of the American Civil War

Coordinates: 35.045°N 85.354°W

- Part of the American Civil War
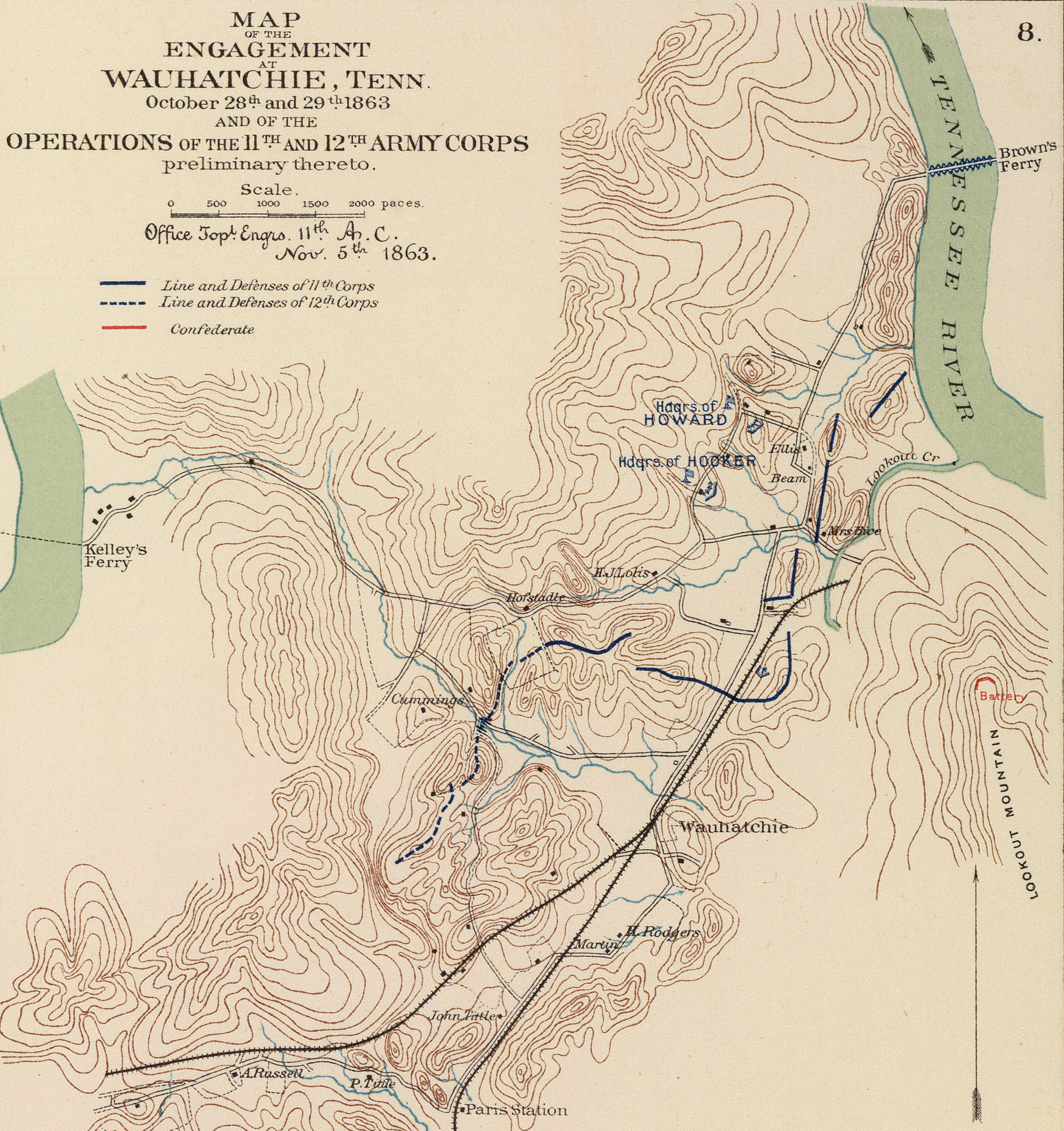
- Wauhatchie battlefield with location of Brown's Ferry in top right
Date	October 27, 1863
Location	Hamilton County, Tennessee
Result	Union victory

Belligerents
United States (Union)	CSA (Confederacy)

Commanders and leaders
William F. Smith	Evander M. Law; William C. Oates

Strength
1st Brigade 3rd Division, IV Corps; 2nd Brigade, 3rd Division, XIV Corps; Engineer Brigade, Dept. of the Cumberland	Law's Brigade, Longstreet's Corps

Casualties and losses
38 (7 KIA, 28 WIA, 3 MIA/POW)	21 (5 KIA, 12 WIA, 4 MIA/POW)

The Battle of Brown's Ferry was an engagement of the American Civil War which took place on October 27, 1863, in Hamilton County, Tennessee. During the battle, two Union brigades drove Confederate sharpshooters from the Tennessee River, which allowed supplies to start arriving to the Union army at Chattanooga via the "Cracker Line". Although a minor engagement, the battle proved to have significant results in paving the way for the Union victory at the Battle of Chattanooga a month later.

== Background ==
Following the defeat at the Battle of Chickamauga the Union Army of the Cumberland was trapped in Chattanooga, Tennessee, by the Confederate Army of Tennessee under Braxton Bragg. Lacking the strength to capture the city by direct assault, Bragg settled into a siege, intending to starve the Union forces into surrender or retreat. To do so, he sent the brigade of Evander Law to a point on the Tennessee River downstream from Chattanooga, ordering it to fire on any Union wagon train which passed along the opposite shore. Law spread the 4th and 15th Alabama Infantry regiments along a 5-mile (8.0 km) front, keeping the other three regiments of his brigade in reserve. When the Union army began using other routes to supply Chattanooga, Law's corps commander James Longstreet ordered three regiments to be pulled back to Lookout Mountain, leaving two regiments along the river, with Colonel William C. Oates of the 15th Alabama in command.

Union commander William S. Rosecrans wired Abraham Lincoln saying "We have no certainty of holding our position here." Lincoln responded by sending reinforcements from the Army of the Potomac and Army of the Tennessee, with the overall command of the force under Ulysses S. Grant, recently promoted to command of the Military Division of the Mississippi. On October 26 Grant initiated operations to open a supply route from Brown's Ferry to Chattanooga. The plan was conceived and to be executed by Grant's chief engineer, Brig. Gen. William F. "Baldy" Smith. Hardtack, an army food staple, was usually despised by the men who were forced to eat it on a constant basis. However, with food running low the soldiers began to cry out even for the hardtack crackers. Thus the proposed supply line was dubbed the "Cracker Line".

== Opposing forces ==
=== Union ===
Chief Engineer, Military Division of the Mississippi: Brig. Gen. William F. Smith

Division	Brigade	Regiments and Others
3rd Division (from the IV Corps)	1st Brigade BG William B. Hazen	6th Indiana: Maj Calvin D. Campbell; 5th Kentucky: Col William W. Berry; 6th Kentucky: Maj Richard T. Whitaker; 23rd Kentucky: Ltc James C. Foy; 1st Ohio: Ltc Bassett Langdon; 6th Ohio: Ltc Alexander C. Christopher; 41st Ohio: Col Aquila Wiley; 93rd Ohio: Maj William Birch; 124th Ohio: Ltc James Pickands
3rd Division (from the XIV Corps)	2nd Brigade BG John B. Turchin	82nd Indiana: Col Morton C. Hunter; 11th Ohio: Ltc Ogden Street; 17th Ohio: Maj Benjamin F. Butterfield; 31st Ohio: Ltc Frederick W. Lister; 36th Ohio: Ltc Hiram F. Devol; 89th Ohio: Cpt John H. Jolly; 92nd Ohio: Ltc Douglas Putnam
Engineers	Boat Party Col Timothy Robbins Stanley	Detachment, 18th Ohio: Cpt Ebenezer Grosvenor; Detachment, 18th Ohio: Cpt Charles A. Cable; Detachment, 2nd & 33rd Ohio: Lt Walter B. McNeal; Detachment, 36th Ohio: Lt James Haddow; Detachment, 92nd Ohio: Lt Stephenson
Artillery	Artillery Battery Maj. John Mendenhall	3 batteries

=== Confederate ===
Longstreet's Corps: Lt. Gen. James Longstreet

Division	Brigade	Regiments and Others
Hood's Division; BG Micah Jenkins	Law's Brigade BG Evander M. Law	4th Alabama: Col William C. Oates; 15th Alabama: Col W.G. Gates; 1 Section, Howitzers: Lt Brown

== Battle ==
Smith was assigned two brigades under Brigadier Generals William B. Hazen and John B. Turchin as well as the Engineer Brigade under Col. Timothy Robbins Stanley. Turchin's men would march overland across a bend in the Tennessee River known as Moccasin Point and hold the east bank at Brown's Ferry. Hazen's men had the more hazardous task. Organized into 50 squads of 21 men each (20 soldiers and 1 officer) Hazen's men would ferry down the river in pontoon boats manned by Stanley's men. A third column under Maj. Gen. Joseph Hooker would advance from Bridgeport, Alabama, for relief of Hazen's men if necessary.

At 3:00 am, Hazen's men boarded the pontoons and quietly rode around Moccasin Point past the Lookout Mountain pickets. Using the river's current for swift movement, an early morning fog helped cover their movements. The landing was to be made at ferry landing and at another gorge downriver. On the morning of October 27, there was one company guarding the ferry, with five companies nearby in reserve. Hazen's men reached the landing points at 5:00 am amidst relative silence, though some Federal soldiers had broken silence when they were fired upon early on. Some of the storming parties slightly missed their objectives, but ultimately the landing points were gained allowing the Union troops to come ashore, drive off the Confederate pickets, and immediately begin entrenching.

Upon hearing the news of the landing, Oates formed a counterattack—using two companies in a diversionary frontal attack and leading the other three in an attempt to cut off the Union force from the ferry. However, the 6th Indiana Infantry had just landed and was able to drive off the Confederates. During the fighting Oates was taken out of action by a gunshot wound to the hip; at this time his men started retreating. Simultaneously, Stanley's oarsmen began to ferry Turchin's men across the river. Hazen and Turchin's combined force now outflanked the Confederates, who retreated to the south toward Wauhatchie.

== Aftermath ==
The "Cracker Line" having been opened, General Hazen joyfully exclaimed "We've knocked the lid off the cracker box!" By mid afternoon on October 27 the pontoon bridge across the river was completed by the 1st Michigan Engineers. Hooker's Federal reinforcements were on their way toward Brown's Ferry. Fearing that this attack was merely a diversion while the real Union attack would come from the south, Longstreet failed to counterattack immediately. Under pressure from Bragg, Longstreet would launch an attack two days later in the Battle of Wauhatchie, but this attack failed.
