= Daniel Holcomb =

- Born: November 13, 1845; Hartford, Ohio
- Died: December 14, 1900 (aged 55); Sedalia, Missouri
- Burial place: Crown Hill Cemetery, Missouri
- Military career
- Allegiance: United States of America
- Branch: United States Army; Union Army
- Rank: Private
- Unit: 41st Ohio Volunteer Infantry Regiment
- Awards: Medal of Honor

Daniel Irvine Holcomb (November 13, 1845 - December 14, 1900) was a recipient of the Medal of Honor and soldier in the Union Army during the American Civil War.

== Biography ==
Enlisting on August 20, 1861, he fought as a private in Company A of the 41st Ohio Volunteer Infantry Regiment. He earned his medal in action at Brentwood Hills, Tennessee on December 16, 1864, for "Capture of Confederate guidon." The Union was attacking Confederate lines at Overton Knob and the Forty-first were placed as skirmishers. In the attack, the regiment fell back, leaving behind Holcomb, William Garrett and a few other soldiers. Split in two distinct groups, Holcomb and the others attacked the lines again and captured prisoners and a flag as the Confederates retreated. Garrett and those with him mounted a similar attack. He became a corporal on February 20, 1865, and mustered out that same year on November 27. The medal was presented on February 22, 1865. After the war he married Almira Ingraham on January 1, 1868, and had one child with her. He worked variously as a salesman and business man in Ohio, Iowa and Missouri which he moved to in 1879. He and his first wife divorced in 1891 leading to his second marriage with Cora Rippey on February 22, 1894. A captain in the Queen City Guards, he was a member of the G.A.R and many other organizations. He was also a Republican councillor and one time city council president. Daniel Holcomb died at 4:00 am on December 14, 1900, of Bright's Disease. After his death, his family was involved in a complicated legal fight over his estate. Holcomb is currently interred at Crown Hill Cemetery, Sedalia, Missouri.
