= Charles Irving Martin =

United States Army general

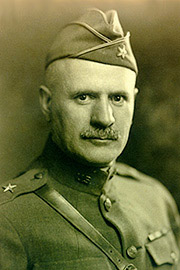
- Martin as a brigadier general, circa 1920
- Born: January 25, 1871; Ogle County, Illinois
- Died: May 8, 1953 (aged 82); Cheyenne, Wyoming
- Burial place: Leavenworth National Cemetery
- Spouse: Lou Ida Ward (m. 1894)
- Children: Lillia Mae Markley
- Military career
- Allegiance: United States of America
- Branch: United States Army
- Service years: 1890–1935
- Rank: Major General
- Service number: 0-101583
- Commands: 1st Brigade Kansas National Guard, 35th Infantry Division, 70th Infantry Brigade,
- Wars: Spanish–American War; Philippine–American War; First World War
- Other work: Attorney

Charles Irving Martin (January 25, 1871 – May 8, 1953) was an American military officer and a lawyer.

== Early life ==
Charles Martin was born to William Martin and Mary Martin in Ogle County, Illinois in 1871.

== Military career ==
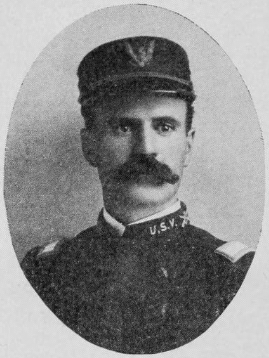
c. 1898

Martin enlisted as a private in the First Kansas Infantry regiment on August 26, 1890. While he was enlisted, Martin attended and graduated from the Normal School at Fort Scott in 1892. In 1893, Martin was commissioned as a second lieutenant in the same regiment, and promoted to captain the following year. He was transferred on April 30, 1898, to the 20th U.S. Volunteers, with whom he saw action in the Philippines during the Spanish–American War. The following year, in 1899, Martin was promoted to major and was transferred to the 20th Kansas Volunteer Infantry, serving in the Philippines during the Philippine–American War.

He returned to the United States in 1901, still part of the 20th Kansas, but working as the clerk for Bourbon County, Kansas district court, position which he held until 1905. During his time as the Bourbon County clerk, Martin was admitted to the Kansas bar and practiced in Fort Scott, Topeka and Wichita. From 1905 to 1909, Martin served as inspector general of the Kansas National Guard as a brigadier general.

=== First World War ===
From 1909 to 1917, Martin served as the Adjutant General of Kansas and commanded the 1st Infantry Brigade of the Kansas National Guard as a brigadier general. On August 5, 1917, some time after the United States' entry into World War I, Martin was given command of the 70th Infantry Brigade, 35th Infantry Division, and departed for France with the rest of the division in May 1918, arriving in Liverpool on May 8, 1918. In May 1918, Martin served as an observer with the British Army while the 35th Division was assigned to their reserve lines during the Spring Offensive of 1918. From July to September 1918, Martin and the 70th Brigade manned a quiet portion of the trenches, before participating in the Saint-Mihiel offensive, although not directly as the 35th Division did not see action until September 26, 1918.

Martin was relieved of command prior to the 70th Infantry Brigade's first action, and was replaced on September 21, 1918, by Colonel Kirby Walker, 139th Infantry Regiment. He was honorably discharged on December 1, 1918.

=== Inter-War period ===
Martin was recommissioned in 1921 as the commanding officer of the 69th Infantry Brigade, Kansas National Guard. During this time, Martin continued to practice law and was admitted to the U.S. Supreme Court bar in 1923. In 1932, now a major general, Martin was given command of the 35th Division until his mandatory retirement at the age of 64 in 1935.

== Personal life and death ==
Charles Irving Martin married Lou Ida Ward on November 28, 1894. Together, they had one child, Lillia Mae Markley.

Prior to his retirement, Martin worked as the manager of the Veterans Administration facility in Wadsworth, Leavenworth County, Kansas, from 1927. He retired from this job in 1941.

Martin lived out the rest of his retirement in Cheyenne, Wyoming, where he died on May 8, 1953. He is buried at the Leavenworth National Cemetery.
