= Timothy Stanley =

Timothy Stanley may refer to:

- Tim Stanley (born 1982), British journalist and historian
- Timothy Robbins Stanley (1810–1874), American Civil War officer
