= 113th Illinois Volunteer Infantry =

American Civil War Union Army unit

113th Regiment Illinois Volunteer Infantry
- Active: 1 October 1862 – 20 June 1865
- Allegiance: Union
- Branch: Infantry
- Engagements: American Civil War: Battle of Chickasaw Bayou; Battle of Arkansas Post; Yazoo Pass Expedition; Battle of Port Gibson; Battle of Champion Hill; Siege of Vicksburg (19 May & 22 May assaults); Battle of Brices Cross Roads

Commanders
- Notable commanders: Colonel George Blaikie Hoge

The 113th Regiment Illinois Volunteer Infantry was an infantry regiment in the Union Army during the American Civil War.

== Service ==
The 113th Illinois Volunteer Infantry Regiment, also known as the Third Chicago Board of Trade regiment, was organized at Camp Hancock near Chicago, Illinois, and mustered in for three years service on 1 October 1862, under the command of Colonel George Blaikie Hoge.

The regiment was attached to 1st Brigade, District of Memphis, Tennessee, Right Wing, XIII Corps, Department of the Tennessee, November 1862. 1st Brigade, 2nd Division, District of Memphis, XIII Corps, to December 1862. 1st Brigade, 2nd Division, Sherman's Yazoo Expedition to January 1863. 1st Brigade, 2nd Division, XV Corps, Army of the Tennessee, to August 1863. 3rd Brigade, 2nd Division, XVI Corps, to November 1863. Post of Corinth, Mississippi, 2nd Division, XVI Corps, to January 1864. 2nd Brigade, District of Memphis, Tennessee, XVI Corps, to June 1864. 2nd Brigade, Sturgis' Expedition, June 1864. 1st Brigade, Post of Memphis, District of West Tennessee, to February 1865. Unattached, Post of Memphis, District of West Tennessee, to June 1865.

Of note, Companies C, D, F, I, and K were sent north to Chicago with prisoners of war after the capture of Arkansas Post on 11 January 1863. The remaining five stayed to participate in the siege and capture of Vicksburg. C, D, F, I, and K rejoined the regiment in December 1864.

During the solicitation for volunteers for the 2nd Division of XV Corps (Union Army)' diversionary storming party, or "forlorn hope," that produced many Medals of Honor on 22 May 1863, the 113th's five companies were assigned a quota of three, unmarried men (the quota for the division was two officers and fifty men from each of the three brigades). The remainder of the regiment took part in the failed assault on 22 May. Even though the assault failed to breach the defenses, the regiment was kept forward and deployed as skirmishers to constantly snipe at the defenders for the next two days, a role it would continue until the capitulation on 4 July 1863.

The 113th Illinois Infantry mustered out of service on 20 June 1865.

=== Casualties ===
The regiment lost a total of 303 men during service; 1 officer and 25 enlisted men killed or mortally wounded, 4 officers and 273 enlisted men died of disease.

=== Detailed service ===
Date	Battle or Event
6 November 1862	Ordered to Memphis, Tennessee
26 November – 12 December 1862	Grant's Central Mississippi Campaign. "Tallahatchie March"
20 December 1862 – 2 January 1863	Sherman's Yazoo Expedition
26–28 December 1862	Chickasaw Bayou
29 December 1862	Chickasaw Bluff
3–10 January 1863	Expedition to Arkansas Post, Arkansas
10–11 January 1863	Assault and capture of Fort Hindman, Arkansas Post (Companies C, D, F, I, and K detached to guard prisoners sent north after Arkansas Post, and retained in Illinois on guard duty until October 1864, when they rejoined the regiment at Memphis, Tennessee)
17–22 January 1863	Moved to Young's Point, Louisiana and duty there until March
14–27 March 1863	Expedition to Rolling Fork, Mississippi, via Muddy, Steele's and Black Bayous and Deer Creek
22 March 1863	Near Deer Creek
19 April – 2 May 1863	Demonstration on Haines' and Drumgould's Bluffs
2–14 May 1863	Movement to Jackson, Mississippi, via Grand Gulf
14 May 1863	Jackson
16 May 1863	Champion Hill
18 May – 4 July 1863	Siege of Vicksburg, Mississippi
19 & 22 May 1863	Assaults on Vicksburg
4 July 1863	Surrender of Vicksburg
4–10 July 1863	Advance on Jackson, Mississippi
10–17 July 1863	Siege of Jackson
17 July 1863–January 1864	Ordered to Memphis, Tennessee, then to Corinth, Mississippi, and post duty there
January 1864–June 1865	At Memphis, Tennessee
1–13 June 1864	Sturgis' Expedition into Mississippi
10 June 1864	Brices Cross Roads (or Tishomingo Creek), near Guntown, Mississippi
11 June 1864	Ripley
10 June 1864	Near Colliersville, Tennessee
21 August 1864	Repulse of Forrest's attack on Memphis
10 October 1864	Eastport

== Notable members ==
- Burritt, William W., Private, Company G - Medal of Honor recipient for action at Vicksburg, 27 April 1863
- Darrough, John S., Sergeant, Company F - Medal of Honor recipient for action at Eastport, Mississippi, 10 October 1864
- Gould, Newton T., Private, Company G - Medal of Honor recipient for action at Vicksburg, 22 May 1863
- Henry, James, Sergeant, Company B - Medal of Honor recipient for action at Vicksburg, 22 May 1863
- Johns, Elisha, Corporal, Company B - Medal of Honor recipient for action at Vicksburg, 22 May 1863
- Miller, Jacob C., Private, Company G - Medal of Honor recipient for action at Vicksburg, 22 May 1863
- Rankin, Adam Lowry, Chaplain - abolitionist and son of noted abolitionist John Rankin
- Ruth Helena Sinnotte - Matron and nurse

== See also ==
- List of Illinois Civil War units
- Illinois in the American Civil War
- Battle of Chickasaw Bayou
- Battle of Arkansas Post (1863)
- Yazoo Pass expedition
- Battle of Port Gibson
- Battle of Champion Hill
- Siege of Vicksburg (19 May & 22 May assaults)
- Battle of Brices Cross Roads
