= William W. Burritt =

- Born: c. 1831; Campbell, New York
- Died: October 18, 1901
- Military career
- Allegiance: United States of America
- Branch: United States Army
- Rank: Private
- Unit: 113th Regiment Illinois Volunteer Infantry - Company G
- Awards: Medal of Honor

Private William W. Burritt (c. 1831 to October 18, 1901) was an American soldier who fought in the American Civil War. Burritt received the country's highest award for bravery during combat, the Medal of Honor, for his action at Vicksburg in Mississippi on 27 April 1863. He was honored with the award on 8 July 1896.

== Biography ==
Burritt was born in Campbell, New York, in 1831 and enlisted into the 113th Illinois Infantry at Chicago, Illinois. He died of mitral insufficiency on 18 October 1901 and his remains are interred at the Leavenworth National Cemetery in Kansas.

== Medal of Honor citation ==
Voluntarily acted as a fireman on a steam tug which ran the blockade and passed the batteries under a heavy fire.

== See also ==
- List of American Civil War Medal of Honor recipients: A–F
