= Milton Barnes (politician) =

American politician (1830–1895)

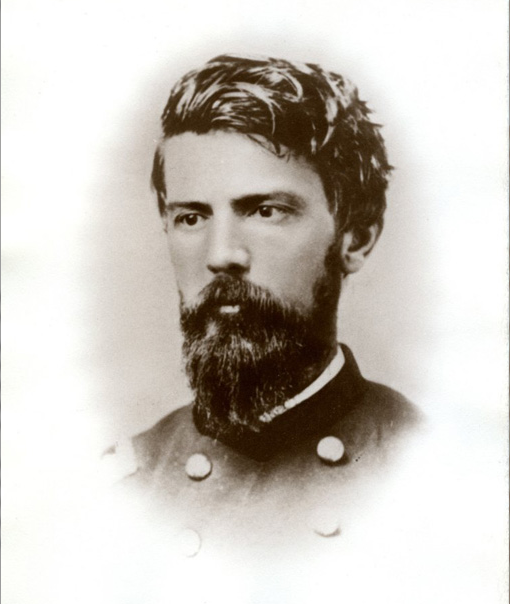

21st Ohio Secretary of State
- In office January 8, 1877 – January 10, 1881
- Governor: Rutherford B. Hayes; Thomas L. Young; Richard M. Bishop; Charles Foster
- Preceded by: William Bell Jr.
- Succeeded by: Charles Townsend

Personal details
- Born: April 26, 1830 Barnesville, Ohio, US
- Died: June 2, 1895 (aged 65) Westerville, Ohio, US
- Resting place: Otterbein Cemetery, Westerville
- Party: Republican
- Education: Allegheny College

Military service
- Allegiance: United States
- Branch/service: Union Army
- Rank: Lieutenant Colonel
- Unit: 62nd Ohio Infantry; 97th Ohio Infantry

Milton Barnes (April 26, 1830 – June 2, 1895) was a Republican politician who was Ohio Secretary of State from 1877 to 1881.

Milton Barnes was born April 26, 1830, in Barnesville, Ohio. He attended country schools and at eighteen became a teacher, and at nineteen attended Allegheny College at Meadville, Pennsylvania, but went home due to failing health. He studied law and higher mathematics at an academy at Salem, Ohio, then at a law office in Mount Vernon, Ohio, and was admitted to the bar in January, 1859. He moved to Cambridge, Ohio, and opened a law office.

At the start of the American Civil War, Barnes raised a company and enlisted as captain in the Sixty-second Ohio Volunteer Infantry. This unit participated in the first Federal invasion of the Shenandoah Valley in the spring of 1862. In mid-1862, Milton returned home on sick leave, resigned his command, and re-enlisted in the Ninety-seventh Regiment as lieutenant colonel. He was twice wounded severely, and mustered out June, 1865.

In 1867 and 1869 Barnes was elected prosecuting attorney of Guernsey County. In 1876 the Republican Party nominated him for Ohio Secretary of State, and he defeated William Bell Jr. in the general election. He won re-election with a plurality over David R. Paige and two others in 1878, and did not run again.

== Notes ==
Political offices
Preceded by William Bell Jr.	Secretary of State of Ohio; 1877–1881	Succeeded by Charles Townsend
