= Leavenworth National Cemetery =

Veterans cemetery in Leavenworth, Kansas

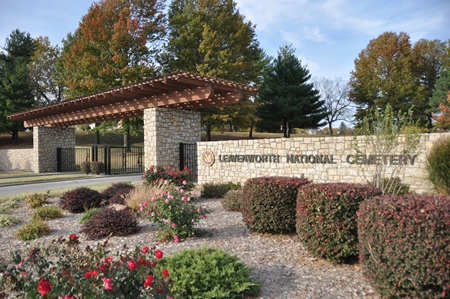
- Entrance to Leavenworth National Cemetery
- Interactive map of Leavenworth National Cemetery

Details
- Established: 1886
- Location: Leavenworth, Kansas
- Country: United States
- Coordinates: 39°16′33″N 94°53′24″W
- Type: United States National Cemetery
- Owned by: United States Department of Veterans Affairs
- Size: 128.8 acres (52.1 ha)
- No. of graves: >45,000
- Website: Leavenworth National Cemetery
- Find a Grave: Leavenworth National Cemetery

Leavenworth National Cemetery is a United States National Cemetery located in the city of Leavenworth, Kansas. It occupies 128.8 acres (52.1 ha) of land. As of the end of 2005 it had 30,875 interments. It is sometimes locally referred to as "Old Soldiers' Home".

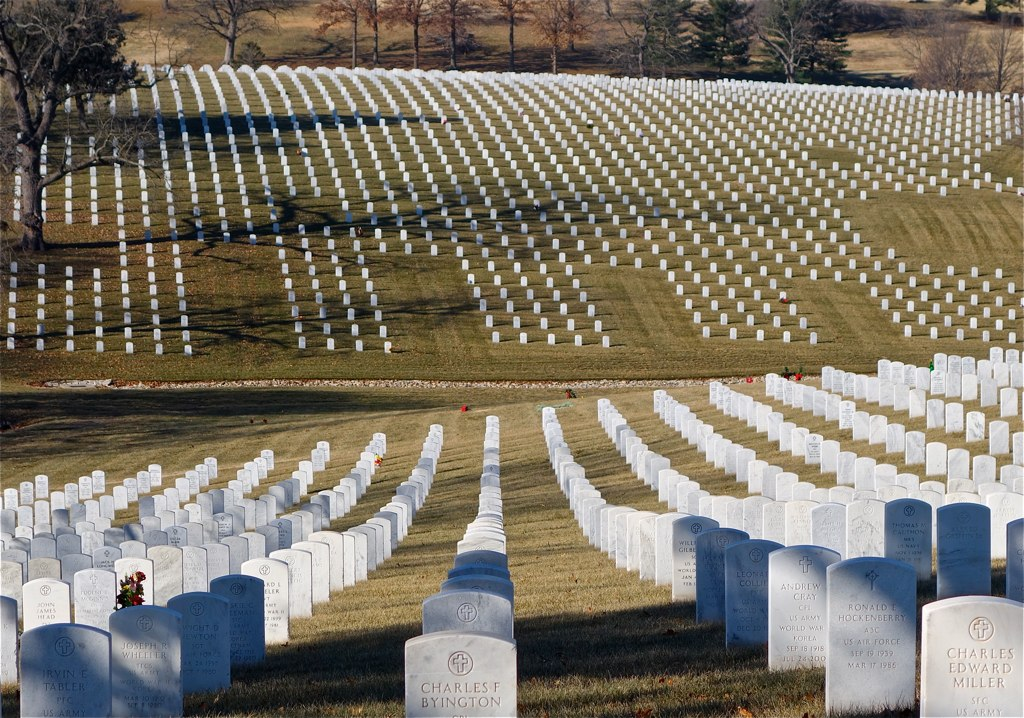

== History ==
Prior to construction of the medical buildings near the site, the land was part of a Delaware Indian reservation. By 1886 several buildings were completed, and the first interment was made. During the construction of one of the nearby medical buildings, the remains of twelve Native Americans were found. They were re-interred in the cemetery.

This burying ground became part of the national cemetery system in 1930. It is the location of seven Medal of Honor recipients, five of them honored for service during the American Civil War, and interments of other notable people.

In 1999 the cemetery was listed on the National Register of Historic Places as a component of the Dwight D. Eisenhower Medical Center Historic District.

== Notable interments ==
- Medal of Honor recipients
  - Private William W. Burritt (1831–1901), for action in the American Civil War.
  - Corporal Daniel A. Dorsey (1838–1918), for action during the Great Locomotive Chase at the time of the American Civil War.
  - Sergeant John S. Durham (1843–1918), for action at the Battle of Perryville during the American Civil War.
  - Sergeant William Garrett (1820–1916), for action at the Battle of Nashville during the American Civil War.
  - First Sergeant John H. Shingle (1840–1907), for action at the Battle of the Rosebud during the Indian Wars.
  - Lieutenant Colonel Charles C. Hagemeister (1946-2021), for action during the Vietnam War
  - Sergeant Robert McPhelan, for "Gallantry in Action" during the Indian Wars (1876-1877)
- Others
  - Brigadier General Charles H. Barth (1858–1926)
  - Ed Charles (1933–2018), Korean War veteran, Major League Baseball player.
  - Arthur Guy Empey (1883–1963), World War I veteran, author, film producer, and actor.
  - Connie Johnson (1922–2004) World War II veteran, Major League Baseball player.
  - Major General Charles Irving Martin (1871–1953)

== Notable monuments ==
- A limestone obelisk, erected in 1919 and dedicated to "Soldiers Who Died For Their Country".
- A monument dedicated to the U.S. 4th Marine Division in 2002.

== See also ==
- United States National Cemetery System
- United States Department of Veterans Affairs
- Wadsworth, Kansas
