= Ruth Sinnotte =

U.S. Civil War Union nurse (1823 – 1897)

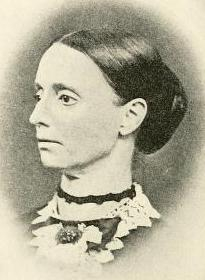
- Ruth Sinnotte, from an 1895 publication.
- Born: Ruth Helena Kellogg; February 14, 1823; Manlius, New York, US
- Died: May 29, 1897 (aged 74); Lexington, Kansas, US
- Occupation: nurse
- Spouse: Jonathan Patrick Sinnotte (m. 1848; died 1852)

Ruth Helena Sinnott (née Kellogg; February 14, 1823 – May 29, 1897) was a Union nurse during the American Civil War.

== Early life ==
Ruth Helena Kellogg was born February 14, 1823, in Manlius, New York, the daughter of Philo Kellogg and Nancy A. Riley Kellogg. She married Jonathan Patrick Sinnotte in 1848; they had two children together, Millard and Nancy, both born in Ohio. Ruth Sinnotte became a young widow with two small children when Jonathan Sinnotte died in 1852. She moved with her son and daughter to Peoria, Illinois.

== Civil War Service ==
During the war, Sinnotte served with both the civilian Western Sanitary Commission, as well as alongside the 113th Illinois Volunteer Infantry. While varied sources for her service survive, there are gaps in the record that prevent an accurate understanding of the timeline of her service history.

=== Western Sanitary Commission ===
Sinnotte was first commissioned by James E. Yeatman in St. Louis, Missouri as a nurse at large for the Western Sanitary Commission. Her initial posting was serving on the steamer Imperial traveling the Tennessee River between Pittsburg Landing and St. Louis. She served aboard the ship under acting surgeon Dr. Grove and Dr. George H. Bixby, assistant surgeon.

While aboard the Imperial on her first trip from Pittsburg Landing to St. Louis, she attended a Colonel who was injured in the Battle of Shiloh. Despondent about his condition and personal affairs, Sinnotte comforted him when he refused to eat, and lashed out at other attendants. She recalled soothing him with the following words:

You must live for the good that needs assistance
For the bad that needs resistance
For the future in the distance
And the good that you can do.

— Ruth Sinotte, Our Army Nurses., p. 128

Sinnotte was able to keep him eating and recovering aboard the ship, as no other could attend him. She was affected to learn on her return trip to St. Louis that he later died at Benton Barracks of intentional starvation. On her next trip aboard the Imperial, she worked through the night to save a soldier sick with typhoid whom the ship's surgeon's had left for dead. Working tirelessly throughout the trip, Sinnotte was credited with saving the man's life.

The Imperial ran for several months as a floating hospital, eventually going out of service due to low tides. Sinnotte was then transferred to the steamer Ella, until this steamer was recommissioned as a transport ship. She then was transferred to a Union hospital in Monterey, Tennessee, which was receiving casualties from the battles in Corinth. Her service there was cut short by illness, causing her to return home to Illinois.

=== 113th Illinois Volunteers ===
Upon her recovery, she reported to Illinois Governor Yates to receive her next commission of service. Yates ordered Sinnotte to travel to join Colonel George Blaikie Hoge and the 113th Illinois Volunteer Infantry. According to her memoirs, Hoge put her name down on the muster roll to serve as the division's matron for a period of three years. She travelled to Memphis with the Infantry on their campaign as part of the Army of the Tennessee. On Hoge's direction, she accompanied the unit to Camp Peabody, and then continued alongside when they participated in the Tullahoma campaign. On the fourth day of the raid, she and the injured travelled to Holly Springs, Mississippi.

After spending some weeks at Holly Springs, on the direction of General Wright, Sinnotte continued her service following the Vicksburg campaign to Memphis. According to her personal account, they left just before the Holly Springs Raid.

== Later years ==
Ruth Sinnotte died in Lexington, Kansas on May 29, 1897, aged 74 years.
