= William Garrett (Medal of Honor) =

American soldier (1842–1916)

- Born: February 6, 1842; Isle of Man
- Died: December 30, 1916 (aged 74)
- Burial place: Leavenworth National Cemetery, Leavenworth, Kansas
- Military career
- Allegiance: United States of America
- Branch: United States Army
- Rank: Sergeant
- Units: Company G, 41st Ohio Volunteer Infantry Regiment
- Conflicts: Battle of Nashville; American Civil War
- Awards: Medal of Honor

William Garrett (February 6, 1842 – December 30, 1916) was a Manx-born American soldier who fought in the American Civil War. Garrett received his country's highest award for bravery during combat, the Medal of Honor. Garrett's medal was won for his actions in the Battle of Nashville in Nashville, Tennessee, on December 16, 1864. He was honored with the award on February 24, 1865.

Garrett was born on the Isle of Man, entered service in Chardon, Ohio, and was buried in Leavenworth National Cemetery.

== Medal of Honor citation ==
The President of the United States of America, in the name of Congress, takes pleasure in presenting the Medal of Honor to Sergeant William Garrett, United States Army, for extraordinary heroism on 16 December 1864, while serving with Company G, 41st Ohio Infantry, in action at Nashville, Tennessee. With several companions Sergeant Garrett dashed forward, the first to enter the enemy's works, taking possession of four pieces of artillery and captured the flag of the 13th Mississippi Infantry (Confederate States of America).

== See also ==
- List of American Civil War Medal of Honor recipients: G–L
