= 68th Indiana Infantry Regiment =

68th Regiment Indiana Infantry
- Active: August 19, 1862 – June 20, 1865
- Country: United States
- Allegiance: Union
- Branch: Infantry
- Engagements: Battle of Munfordville; Tullahoma Campaign; Battle of Chickamauga; Chattanooga campaign Battle of Missionary Ridge; Battle of Nashville

The 68th Regiment Indiana Infantry was an infantry regiment that served in the Union Army during the American Civil War.

== Service ==
The 68th Indiana Infantry was organized at Indianapolis, Indiana and mustered in for three years service August 19, 1862.

The regiment was attached to 1st Brigade, 2nd Division, Army of Kentucky, Department of the Ohio. 2nd Brigade, 4th Division, XIV Corps, Army of the Cumberland, to October 1863. 2nd Brigade, 3rd Division, XIV Corps, October 1863. 1st Brigade, 3rd Division, IV Corps, Army of the Cumberland, to April 1864. Garrison at Chattanooga, Tennessee, Department of the Cumberland, to November 1864. In response to Hood's invasion, it was recalled to Nashville where it joined 2nd Brigade, 1st Separate Division, District of the Etowah, Dept. of the Cumberland. (Note: The historian Wiley Sword describes this brigade as composed of rear echelon white troops described by their commander, LTCLCharles H. Grosvenor as "new conscripts, convalescents, and bounty jumpers." Sword seems to interpret Grosvenor's comment as applying to the whole brigade where it more probably referred with this comment to the provisional battalion. In fact, his two core units, the 68th Indiana and the 18th Ohio Veteran were seasoned units who while being ground down by three years of fighting had maintained their presence by consolidation of veterans from other units) This brigade and the 1st Colored made the assaults on Hood's right at the Battle of Nashville. They remained in Nashville as part of the garrison to June 1865.

The 68th Indiana Infantry mustered out of service on June 20, 1865, at Nashville, Tennessee.

== Detailed service ==
The regiment left Indiana for Louisville, Kentucky on August 20, 1862, and subsequently moved to Lebanon, Kentucky on August 25; then to Munfordville, Kentucky, where the regiment was involved in the Siege of Munfordville from September 14–17. The regiment was captured September 17, but later paroled and sent to Indianapolis. It reorganized at Indianapolis until December 25, and then moved back to Louisville, Kentucky, December 26; then to Murfreesboro, Tennessee on January 1, 1863. It went on duty at Murfreesboro, from January to June 1863, and participated in the expedition to McMinnville on April 20–30. It fought in the Tullahoma Campaign on June 23-July 7, where it took part in the Battle of Hoover's Gap on June 24–26, and then went to Tullahoma on June 29–30. Along with the rest of the Union forces in the area, it occupied Middle Tennessee until August 16, and later took part in the Passage of the Cumberland Mountains and Tennessee River, and the Chickamauga Campaign from August 16-September 22. It reached Shellmound on August 21, from where it performed reconnaissance toward Chattanooga on August 30–31, then engaging in the Battle of Chickamauga September 19–21. Before Chattanooga September 22–26. Siege of Chattanooga September 22-November 23. Chattanooga-Ringgold Campaign November 23–27. Orchard Knob November 23–24. Missionary Ridge November 25. March to relief of Knoxville November 28-December 8. It operated in eastern Tennessee until April 1864, being around Dandridge on January 16–17, and then went on garrison duty at Chattanooga from April to September 1864. Relief of Dalton, Georgia, August 14–15. March to Cleveland, Charleston, Athens, and Madisonville August 18–20. It moved to Tullahoma on September 1, then to Chattanooga and Decatur, Alabama, October 27, where it participated in the defence of the city, on October 29–31. Duty at Resaca, Georgia, November 13–29; then moved to Nashville, Tennessee. Battle of Nashville, December 15–16. Pursuit of Hood to the Tennessee River December 17–28. It moved to Chattanooga, Tennessee, and was on garrison duty there until June 1865, from where it moved to Nashville, Tennessee, on June 16.

== Casualties ==
The regiment lost a total of 150 men during service; 4 officers and 35 enlisted men were killed or mortally wounded, and 111 enlisted men died of disease.

== Commanders ==
- Colonel Edward A. King – original commander
- Lieutenant Colonel Harvey J. Espy – commanded during the Chattanooga-Ringgold Campaign until wounded in action
- Captain Richard L. Leeson – commanded at the Battle of Chickamauga

== See also ==
- List of Indiana Civil War regiments
- Indiana in the Civil War
