= Aquila Wiley =

American politician (1835-1910)

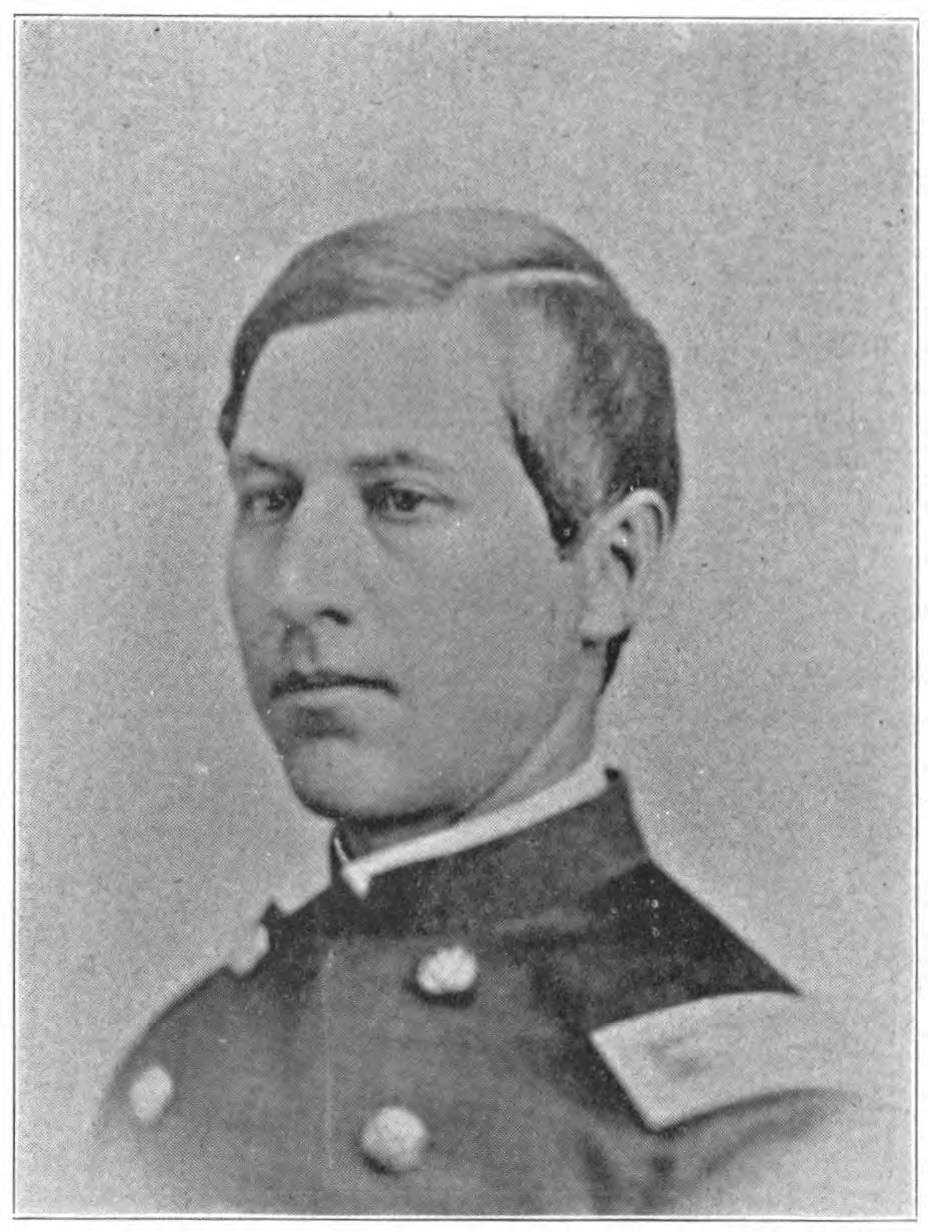
- Colonel, 41st Ohio Infantry

Member of the Ohio House of Representatives from the Wayne County district
- In office January 6, 1896 – December 31, 1899
- Preceded by: Charles A. Weiser
- Succeeded by: Urias F. Wells

Personal details
- Born: February 20, 1835 Cumberland County, Pennsylvania
- Died: June 5, 1910 (aged 75) Wooster, Ohio
- Resting place: Wooster Cemetery
- Party: Democratic
- Spouse: Emma Pawer
- Children: 2

Military service
- Allegiance: United States
- Branch/service: Union Army
- Years of service: 1861–1864
- Rank: Colonel; Brevet Brigadier General
- Unit: 41st Ohio Infantry
- Battles/wars: American Civil War

Aquila Wiley (February 20, 1835 – June 5, 1910) was a Union Army officer in the American Civil War.

Aquila Wiley was born in Mechanicsburg, Pennsylvania, on February 20, 1835. He was a lawyer.

Wiley entered Union Army service as a first lieutenant of the 16th Ohio Infantry Regiment. He was promoted to captain on May 4, 1861. He was mustered out of the volunteers on August 18, 1861. On September 19, 1861, Wiley re-enlisted as a captain in the 41st Regiment, Ohio Volunteer Infantry Regiment. Wiley was promoted to major, June 22, 1861, to lieutenant colonel on December 6, 1862, and to colonel on April 15, 1863.

Wiley was wounded in the Battle of Shiloh, April 6–7, 1862. He was much more seriously wounded at the Battle of Missionary Ridge, November 25, 1863, resulting in his left leg being amputated. He was discharged from the volunteers on June 7, 1864. Wiley returned to the volunteer service as a captain in the Veteran Reserve Corps, March 25, 1865. He was promoted to major on April 27, 1865. He was mustered out of the volunteers on March 28, 1866.

On May 31, 1866, President Andrew Johnson nominated Wiley for appointment to the grade of brevet brigadier general of volunteers, to rank from March 13, 1865, and the United States Senate confirmed the appointment on July 23, 1866.

After the war, Wiley was a Democratic politician. Congressman and future president William McKinley defeated him in 1878 by a vote count of 15,489 to 14,255. Republican Allen T. Wikoff defeated him for the office of Secretary of State in 1872.

Aquila Wiley died on June 5, 1910, at Wooster, Ohio, aged 75. He was buried at Wooster Cemetery, Wooster, Ohio.

== See also ==
- List of American Civil War brevet generals (Union)
