= Elisha Bassett Langdon =

American politician and lawyer

- Born: February 24, 1827; Linwood, Ohio, US
- Died: May 30, 1867 (aged 40); Cincinnati, Ohio, US
- Burial place: Spring Grove Cemetery; Cincinnati, Ohio, US
- Military career
- Allegiance: Union
- Branch: Union Army
- Rank: Lieutenant Colonel; Bvt. Brigadier General
- Units: 1st Ohio Infantry Regiment; XX Corps
- Conflicts: American Civil War
- Other work: Ohio state representative; Ohio state senator

Elisha Bassett Langdon (February 24, 1827 – May 30, 1867) was an American politician and lawyer who served as a brevet brigadier general in the Union Army during the period of the American Civil War.

== Career ==
Langdon had been a Democrat before the war and had served in the Ohio House of Representatives and the Ohio Senate.

Langdon began the war serving a major in the 1st Ohio Infantry Regiment which he later led as its lieutenant colonel. He served in battles such as Shiloh, Perryville, Chickamauga, and at Chattanooga's Battle of Missionary Ridge. At the end of the war, he was named a brevet brigadier general with a promotion date of March 13, 1865, and made assessor of internal revenue for the first district of Ohio. Langdon had also served as inspector general for General Alexander McDowell McCook's division and corps. He had been severely wounded in the face and neck while leading a successful charge at Missionary Ridge, and would never completely recover from his war wounds. He died suddenly on May 30, 1867, in Cincinnati, Ohio.

== See also ==
- List of American Civil War brevet generals (Union)
