= John S. Darrough =

American civil war union soldier (1841–1920)

John Samuel Darrough
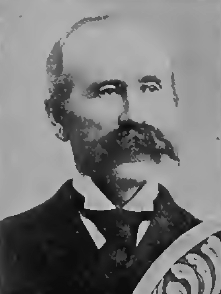
- Sergeant John S. Darrough
- Born: April 6, 1841; Maysville, Kentucky, US
- Died: August 14, 1920 (aged 79)
- Military career
- Allegiance: United States
- Branch: United States Army
- Service years: 1862 - 1865
- Rank: Sergeant
- Unit: 113th Illinois Volunteer Infantry Regiment
- Conflicts: American Civil War
- Awards: Medal of Honor

John Samuel Darrough (April 6, 1841 – August 14, 1920) was a Union Army soldier in the American Civil War and a recipient of the United States military's highest decoration, the Medal of Honor, for his actions during a skirmish near Eastport, Mississippi. Born in Kentucky, Darrough moved to Illinois as a child and enlisted in the Union Army from that state. While participating in a mission to destroy a Confederate railway, Darrough and others were stranded on the shore of the Tennessee River under intense enemy fire. Although he had found a canoe with which to cross the river safely, he voluntarily returned to the Confederate-held shore to rescue a fellow soldier who was in danger of drowning.

== Early life ==
Darrough was born Maysville, Kentucky, to Samuel Vogan and Ricey Ann Quaintance Darrough. By 1850, the family had moved to neighboring Mason County, where they owned a large farm. In 1855 they moved again, this time to Iroquois County, Illinois, where Darrough would live the rest of his life.

== Military service ==
Darrough enlisted in the Army from Concord, Illinois, on August 12, 1862. He served in Company F of the 113th Illinois Volunteer Infantry Regiment, and by October 10, 1864, had reached the rank of sergeant. On that day, his regiment was dispatched from Memphis, Tennessee, to Eastport, Mississippi, to destroy train tracks and a bridge used by the Confederates. The regiment was transported up the Mississippi and Tennessee Rivers by two steam-powered gunboats. As the men disembarked from the boats onto the south bank of the Tennessee River just downstream of Eastport, they came under fire from a concealed battery of Confederate artillery. The battery was at close range, and its fire proved devastating to both the men and the boats. The gunboats immediately withdrew from the shore, without having time to take up their gangplanks. The men on shore, including Darrough, were now stranded and under intense fire. As one boat engaged the Confederates, the other proceeded downstream and, after reaching a point which was partly out of range of the artillery, pulled alongside the shore and took on all the soldiers who had reached that point.

Darrough was unable to reach the boat in time and was again stranded as it pulled away from shore. He continued to follow the riverbank downstream until a deep bayou blocked his path. Deciding that his only option to avoid being killed or captured was to swim the mile-wide river, and knowing that his clothes and gun would weigh him down, he began looking for a log to float on. As he searched the bank, he found a canoe hidden in the reeds. Overjoyed, he jumped in and paddled out into the river, hoping to either catch up with the gunboats, which had headed downstream, or cross to the other side of the river and rejoin the Union forces by foot. As he paddled, he looked back and noticed a Union man struggling in the water along the Confederate-held shoreline. The soldier, Captain A.W. Becket of Company B, had attempted to cross the bayou but part-way through found himself too weak to continue; Becket had been ill and had left his sickbed to participate in the mission. Despite the risk, Darrough turned his canoe around and headed back towards the Confederates and the struggling man. He succeeded in getting Becket into the canoe, and then safely reached the opposite shore. For these actions, he was awarded the Medal of Honor several decades later, on February 5, 1895. Darrough's official Medal of Honor citation reads simply: "Saved the life of a captain."

During his military service, Darrough was wounded and once escaped from Confederate captivity. After the war, he returned to Iroquois County where he resided until his death at age 79.

== Medal of Honor citation ==
Rank and organization: Sergeant, Company F, 113th Illinois Infantry. Place and date: At Eastport, Miss., 10 October 1864. Entered service at: Concord, Morgan County, Ill. Birth: Kentucky. Date of issue: 5 February 1895.

Citation

Saved the life of a captain.

== See also ==
- List of Medal of Honor recipients
- List of American Civil War Medal of Honor recipients: A–F
