= Allen T. Wikoff =

American politician

Allen Trimble Wikoff
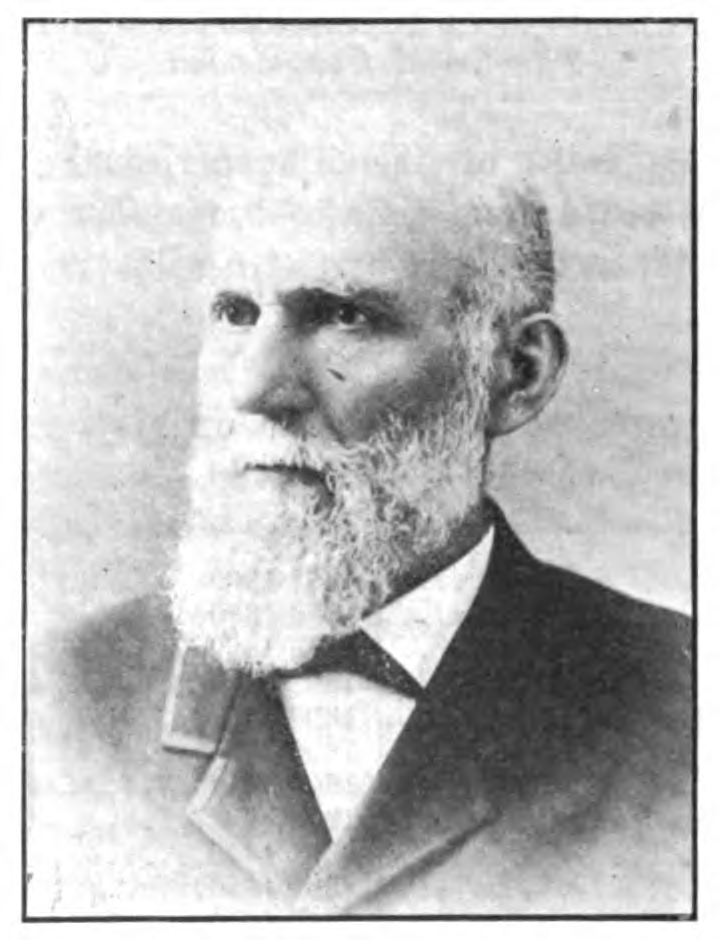

19th Ohio Secretary of State
- In office January 13, 1873 – January 11, 1875
- Governor: Edward F. Noyes; William Allen
- Preceded by: Isaac R. Sherwood
- Succeeded by: William Bell, Jr.

Personal details
- Born: November 15, 1825 Adams County, Ohio
- Died: July 22, 1902 (aged 76) Columbus, Ohio
- Resting place: Green Lawn Cemetery; Columbus, Ohio
- Party: Republican

Allen Trimble Wikoff (November 15, 1825 – July 22, 1902) was a Republican politician who was Ohio Secretary of State from 1873 to 1875.

Allen Trimble Wikoff was born November 15, 1825, on an Adams County, Ohio, farm. In 1862, during the American Civil War, he enlisted as a lieutenant in the Ninety-first Ohio Volunteer Infantry, was promoted to captain, and served to the end of the war. He resided in Columbus after the war, read law and was admitted to the bar. In 1871, he became chief clerk in the office of Ohio Secretary of State under Isaac R. Sherwood. He was nominated as a Republican for the office of Secretary of State in 1872, and defeated Democrat Aquila Wiley and Progressive Ferdinand Schumacher. In 1874 he was nominated again, but lost to Democrat William Bell, Jr., with Progressive John R. Buchtel also running.

In 1874, 1875 and 1876, Wikoff was Chairman of the Republican State Executive Committee. In 1876, he was appointed Adjutant General by Governor Rutherford B. Hayes, and was chosen National Republican Committeeman for the State. He resigned that position after one meeting.

In February 1877, Wikoff was appointed Pension Agent for the State of Ohio by President Grant. He was re-appointed by President Hayes in 1881, and by Chester A. Arthur, and held the office until July 31, 1885, when Grover Cleveland replaced him with a Democrat.

In December, 1885, Wikoff was appointed receiver of the Cleveland and Marietta Railroad, and had charge of the property until 1893. In 1896 he was appointed to the Ohio Canal Commission by Governor Asa S. Bushnell. He was re-appointed by Governor Nash in 1900, and served until he died July 22, 1902. He was interred at Green Lawn Cemetery, Columbus, Ohio.

== Notes ==
Political offices
Preceded by Isaac R. Sherwood	Secretary of State of Ohio; 1873–1875	Succeeded by William Bell, Jr.
