= James Henry (soldier) =

- Born: April 7, 1833; Sunfish, Ohio, US
- Died: June 7, 1911 (aged 78); Illinois, US
- Burial place: Oak Hill Cemetery, Geneva, Illinois
- Military career
- Allegiance: United States
- Branch: United States Army; Union Army
- Rank: First Sergeant
- Units: Company B, 113th Illinois Volunteer Infantry
- Conflicts: American Civil War • Siege of Vicksburg
- Awards: Medal of Honor

James Henry (1833–1911) was a Union Army soldier during the American Civil War. He received the Medal of Honor for gallantry during the Siege of Vicksburg on May 22, 1863.

Henry joined the 113th Illinois Infantry in August 1862, and was mustered out in June 1865.

He died in 1911, and was buried at Oak Hill Cemetery in Geneva, Illinois.

== Union assault ==
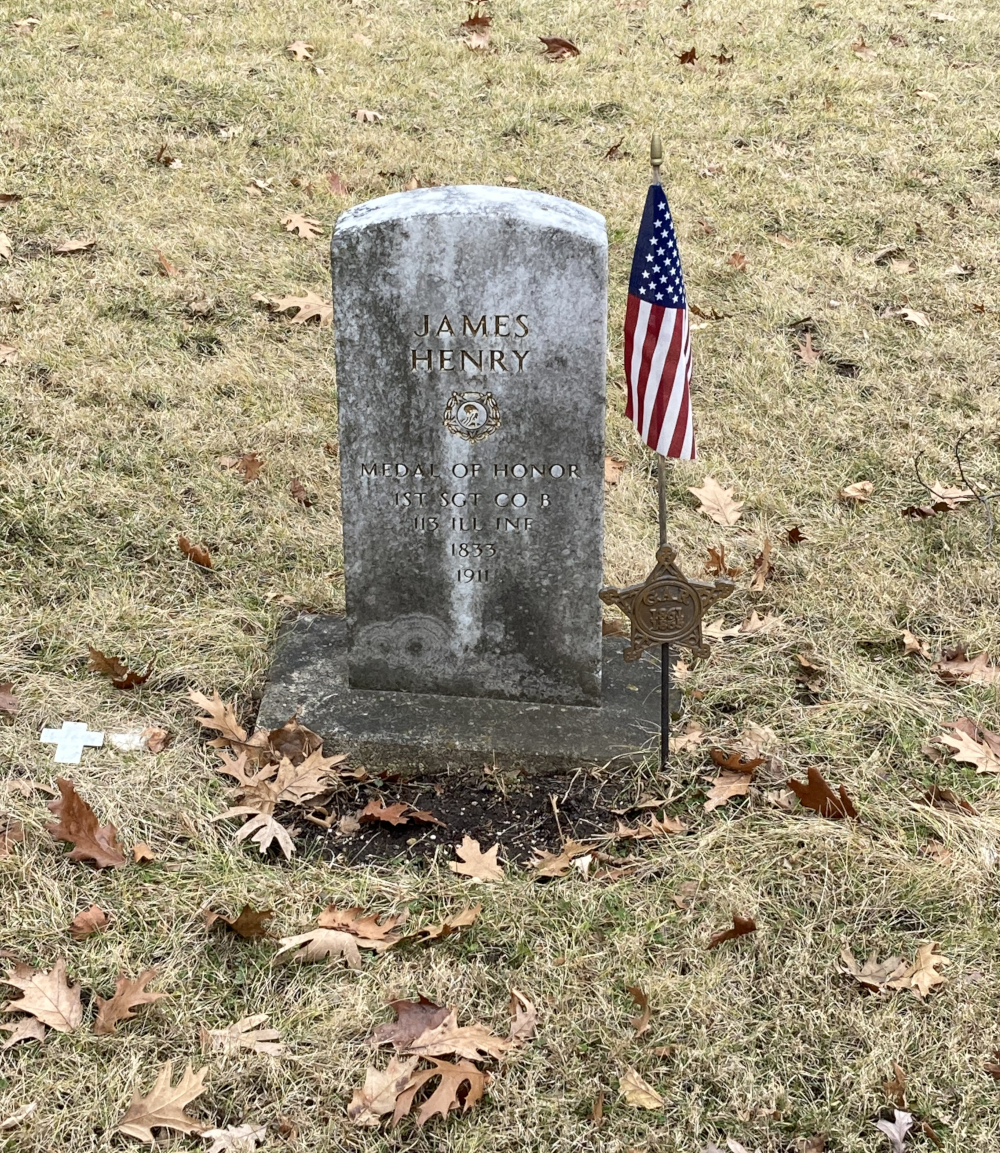
Henry's grave at Oak Hill Cemetery

On May 22, 1863, General Ulysses S. Grant ordered an assault by XV Corpson the Confederate heights at Vicksburg, Mississippi. The 2nd Division was to lead the assault. The plan called for a diversionary storming party of volunteers to build a bridge across a moat and plant scaling ladders against the enemy embankment in advance of the main attack.

The Division Commander, MGEN Blair called for volunteers for the party. The volunteers knew the odds were against survival and the mission was called, in nineteenth century vernacular, a "forlorn hope". They were promised sixty days furlough if they survived. Each brigade (there were three) had a quota of two officers and fifty men.

Only single men were accepted as volunteers and even then, twice as many men as needed came forward and were turned away. In the 113th Illinois, the five companies had a quota of three man each. In Company B, Henry volunteered along with two friends Elisha Johns and Joseph Smith. The assault began in the early morning following a naval bombardment. The Union soldiers came under enemy fire immediately and were pinned down in the ditch they were to cross. Despite repeated attacks by the main Union body, the men of the forlorn hope were unable to retreat until nightfall. Of the 150 men in the storming party, nearly half were killed. Seventy-nine of the survivors were awarded the Medal of Honor.

== Medal of Honor citation ==
"For gallantry in the charge of the volunteer storming party on 22 May 1863."

== See also ==
- List of Medal of Honor recipients
- List of American Civil War Medal of Honor recipients: G-L
- Siege of Vicksburg
- 113th Illinois Volunteer Infantry
