= 18th Ohio Infantry Regiment =

- Cavalry guidon
- Active: May 29, 1861, to August 28, 1861 (3 months); November 4, 1861, to November 9, 1864 (3 years)
- Country: United States
- Allegiance: Union
- Branch: Union Army
- Type: Infantry
- Engagements: Battle of Stones River; Tullahoma Campaign; Battle of Chickamauga; Siege of Chattanooga; Battle of Missionary Ridge

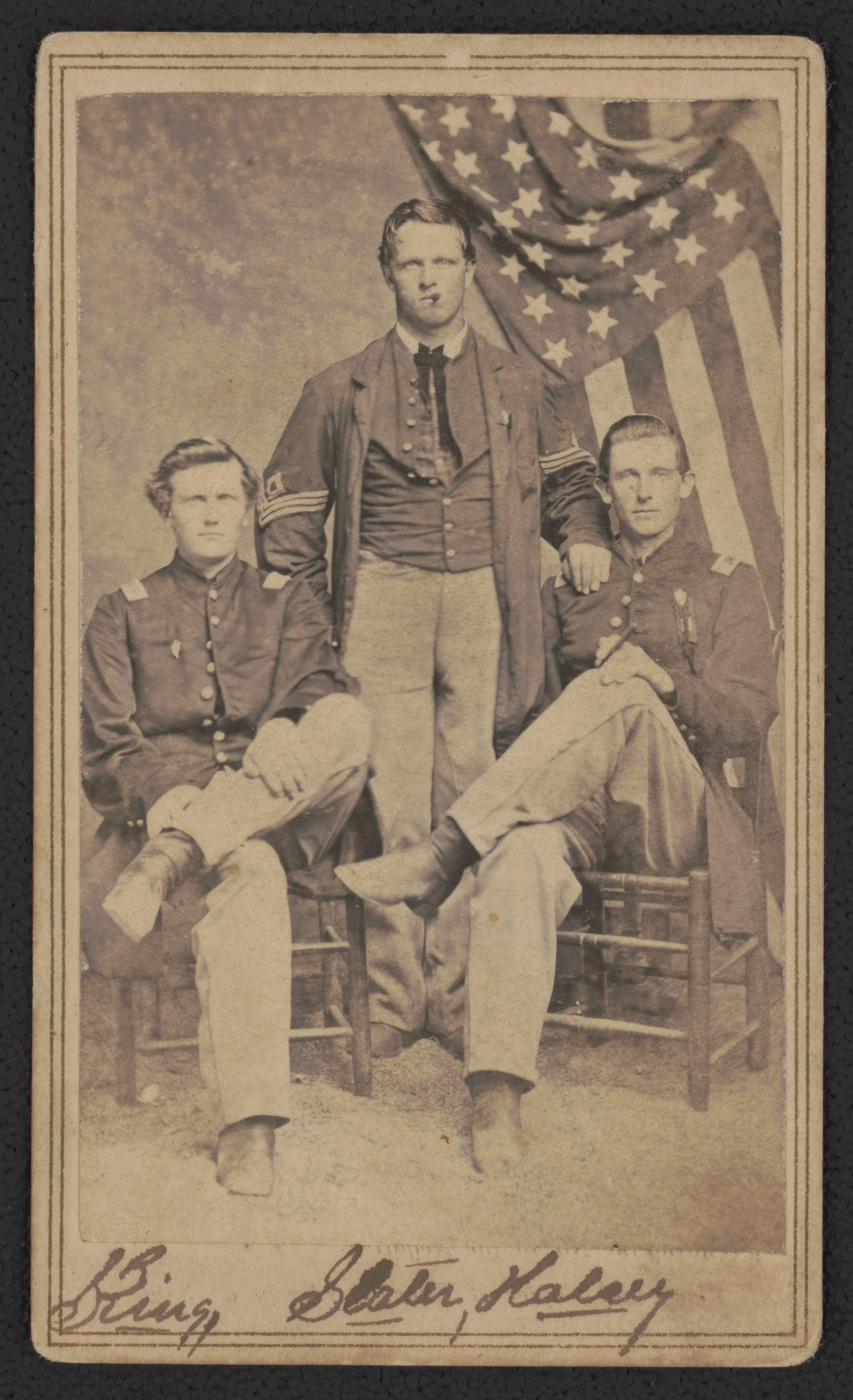
First Lieutenant Robert S. King, Second Lieutenant James W. Slater, and Captain Milton W. Halsey of 18th Ohio Infantry Regiment. From the Liljenquist Family Collection of Civil War Photographs, Prints and Photographs Division, Library of Congress

The 18th Ohio Infantry Regiment was an infantry regiment in the Union Army during the American Civil War.

== Service ==
=== Three-months regiment ===
Companies A, C, and E enrolled at Ironton, Ohio, on April 22, 1861. Company B enrolled at Marietta, Ohio, on April 27, 1861. Company D enrolled at McArthur, Ohio, on April 18, 1861. Company F enrolled at Gallipolis, Ohio, on April 22, 1861. Company I enrolled at Jackson, Ohio, on April 24. And Company K enrolled at Beverly, Ohio, on April 23, 1861.

The 18th Ohio Infantry Regiment organized at Parkersburg, Virginia, and mustered in May 29, 1861, under Colonel Timothy Robbins Stanley in response to President Lincoln's call for 75,000 volunteers. Companies were sent to different points on the Baltimore & Ohio Railroad to guard the railroad and trains between Parkersburg and Clarksburg, West Virginia (then Virginia), until August.

The regiment mustered out at Columbus, Ohio, on August 28, 1861.

=== Three-years regiment ===
The 18th Ohio Infantry was reorganized in Athens, Ohio, August 16-September 28, 1861. The regiment moved to Camp Dennison near Cincinnati, Ohio, and mustered in for three years service on November 4, 1861, under the command of Colonel Timothy R. Stanley.

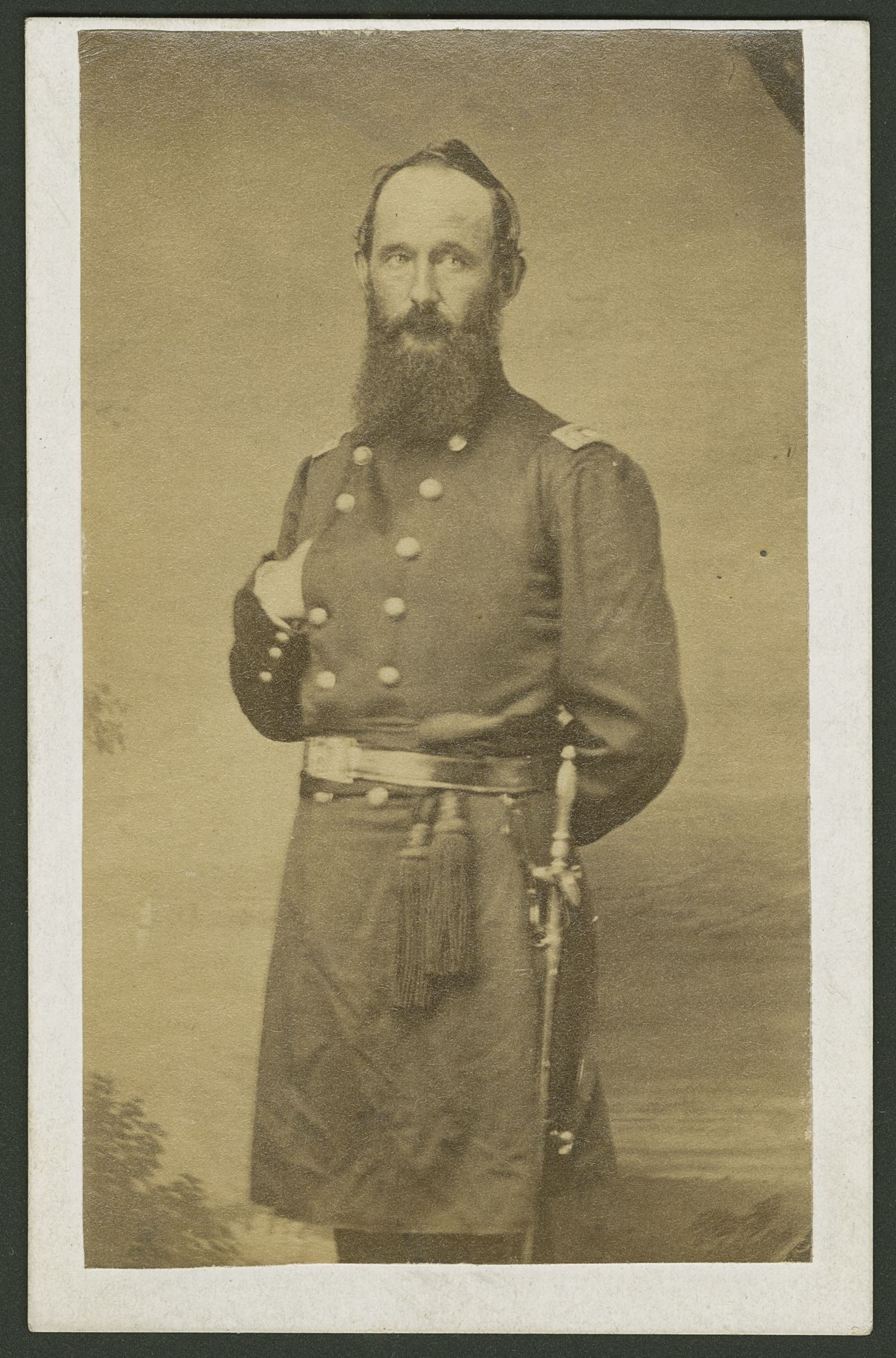
William Parker Johnson of Athens, Ohio Surgeon of the 18th Ohio Volunteer Infantry Regiment. Image from the William Parker Johnson letters a special collection of Civil War Correspondence at the Mahn Center for Archives and Special Collections at Ohio University Libraries.

The regiment was attached to 8th Brigade, Army of the Ohio to December 1861. 8th Brigade, 3rd Division, Army of the Ohio, to July 1862. Unattached, Railroad Guard, Army of the Ohio, to September 1862. 29th Brigade, 8th Division, Army of the Ohio, to November 1862. 2nd Brigade, 2nd Division, Center, XIV Corps, Army of the Cumberland, to January 1863. 2nd Brigade, 2nd Division, XIV Corps, to October 1863. 2nd Brigade, 1st Division, XIV Corps, to November 1863. Engineer Brigade, Department of the Cumberland, to November 1864.

=== Veteran infantry regiment ===
Organized at Chattanooga, Tenn., by consolidation of the Veteran detachments of the 1st, 2nd, 18th, 24th and 35th Ohio Infantry October 31, 1864. This consolidated unit was attached to Post of Chattanooga, Dept. of the Cumberland, to November, 1864 and continued to perform engineering duty. In response to Hood's invasion, it was recalled to Nashville where it joined 2nd Brigade, 1st Separate Division, District of the Etowah, Dept. of the Cumberland. (Note: The historian Wiley Sword describes this brigade as composed of rear echelon white troops described by their commander, LTCLCharles H. Grosvenor as "new conscripts, convalescents, and bounty jumpers." Sword seems to interpret Grosvenor's comment as applying to the whole brigade where it more probably referred with this comment to the provisional battalion. In fact, his two core units, the 68th Indiana and the 18th Ohio Veteran were seasoned units who while being ground down by three years of fighting had maintained their presence by consolidation of veterans from other units) This brigade and the 1st Colored made the assaults on Hood's right at the Battle of Nashville. They remained in Nashville to Jul., 1865. District of Augusta, GA to October, 1865. The 18th Ohio Infantry mustered out of service there on October 22, 1865.

== Detailed service ==
Moved to Louisville, Ky., November 6, thence to Elizabethtown, Ky., November 15. Duty at Elizabethtown and Bacon Creek, Ky., November 1861 to February 1862. Advance on Bowling Green, Ky., February 10–15, and on Nashville, Tenn., February 18–25. Occupation of Nashville, Tenn., February 25-March 18. Reconnaissance to Shelbyville, Tullahoma and McMinnville March 25–28. To Fayetteville April 7. Expedition to Huntsville, Ala., April 10–11. Capture of Huntsville April 11. Advance on and capture of Decatur April 11–14. Operations near Athens, Limestone Bridge, Mooresville and Elk River May 1–2. Near Pulaski and near Bridgeport May 1. Moved to Fayetteville May 31. Negley's Expedition to Chattanooga June 1–15. At Battle Creek until July 11. Guard duty along Tennessee & Alabama Railroad from Tullahoma to McMinnville until September. Short Mountain Road and McMinnville August 29 (Companies A and I). Retreat to Nashville, Tenn. Siege of Nashville September 12-November 7. Near Lavergne October 7. Duty at Nashville until December 26. Advance on Murfreesboro December 26–30. Battle of Stones River December 30–31, 1862 and January 1–3, 1863. Duty at Murfreesboro until June. Tullahoma Campaign June 23-July 7. Occupation of middle Tennessee until August 16. Passage of Cumberland Mountains and Tennessee River and Chickamauga Campaign August 16-September 22. Davis Cross Roads or Dug Gap September 11. Battle of Chickamauga September 19 21. Rossville Gap September 21. Siege of Chattanooga, Tenn., September 24-November 23. Reopening Tennessee River October 26–29. Brown's Ferry October 27. Chattanooga-Ringgold Campaign November 23–27. Orchard Knob November 23–24. Missionary Ridge November 25. Engaged in engineer duty at Chattanooga until October 20, 1864.

== Casualties ==
The regiment lost a total of 184 men during service; 4 officers and 72 enlisted men killed or mortally wounded, 1 officer and 107 enlisted men died of disease.

== Commanders ==
- Colonel Timothy Robbins Stanley
- Lieutenant Colonel Josiah Given - commanded at the battle of Stones River
- Lieutenant Colonel Charles H. Grosvenor - commanded at the battle of Chickamauga

== See also ==
- List of Ohio Civil War units
- Ohio in the Civil War
