= 1st Ohio Infantry Regiment =

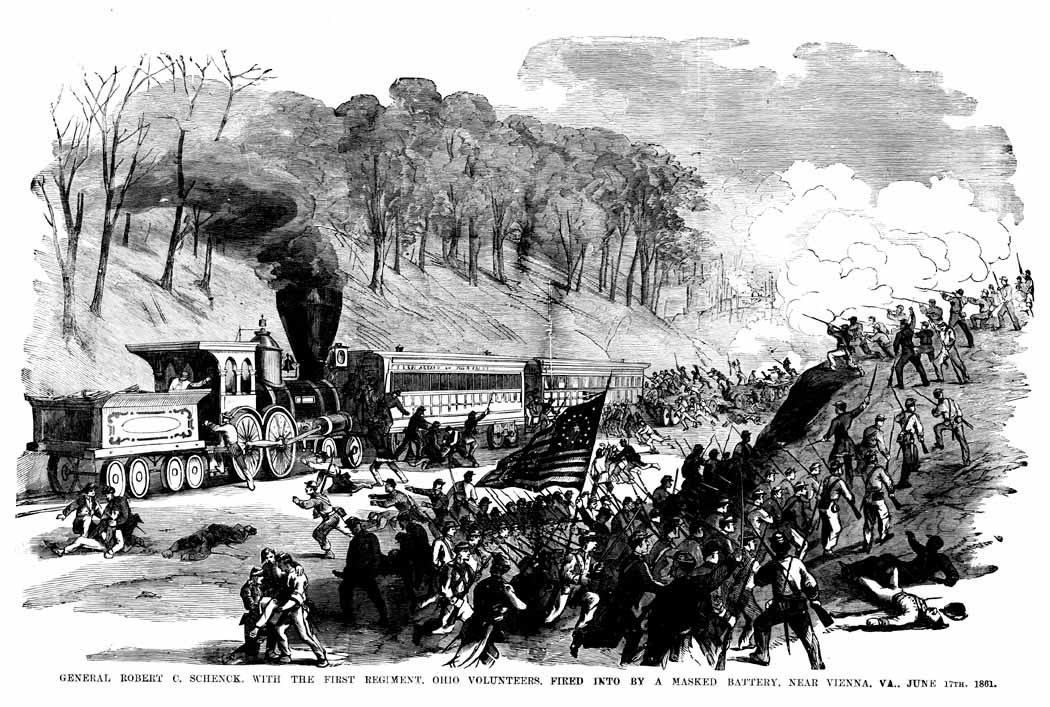
- 1st Ohio Infantry Regiment in action at Vienna, Virginia; June 17, 1861
- Active: 1861–64
- Country: United States
- Allegiance: Union
- Branch: Infantry
- Type: Regiment
- Size: 950 soldiers at outset of the war
- Engagements: Battle of Vienna; First Battle of Bull Run; Battle of Shiloh; Siege of Corinth; Battle of Stones River; Tullahoma Campaign; Battle of Chickamauga; Chattanooga campaign; Battle of Missionary Ridge; Battle of Rocky Face Ridge; Battle of Resaca; Battle of Adairsville; Battle of Pickett's Mill; Battle of Kennesaw Mountain; Battle of Pace's Ferry

Commanders
- Notable commanders: Alexander M. McCook

The 1st Ohio Infantry Regiment was a three-month regiment and later a three-year infantry regiment in the Union Army during the American Civil War. After initial service in defense of Washington and First Battle of Bull Run, its three year incarnation served in the Western Theater in a number of campaigns and battles.

== Three-months regiment ==
With the outbreak of the Civil War in the spring of 1861, President Abraham Lincoln called for 75,000 volunteers from nearly every state. In April, recruiters quickly filled the quota for a number of regiments in the state of Ohio, with several regiments enlisting for 3-months, including a command designated as the 1st Ohio. Mustering on April 17, 1861, under Colonel Alexander M. McCook, the 1st Ohio Infantry Regiment travelled by train to Washington, D.C. for garrison duty in the capital's fortifications and defenses until July. The regiment was placed in Schenck's Brigade, Tyler's Division, Irvin McDowell's Army of Northeastern Virginia. It first saw action at Vienna, Virginia, on June 17 and again on July 9 before occupying Fairfax Court House. It fought at the First Battle of Bull Run and helped cover the army's bitter retreat to Washington. The regiment soon returned to Ohio and mustered out August 2. The regiment was divided into ten separate companies A-K. Each company was stationed out of a different village A-Lancaster B Lafayette C Dayton D Montogomery E Cleveland F Hiberian G Portsmouth H Zanesville I Mansfield K Jaskson.

== Three-years regiment ==
After the term of service was over in August, a number of the men re-enlisted for 3-years in the reconstituted 1st Ohio Infantry Regiment, under the command of Col. Benjamin F. Smith. The regiment was organized at Camp Corwin in Dayton between August 5 and October 30, receiving muskets, uniforms, and accoutrements. On the last day of August, the regiment entrained for Cincinnati for additional training and guard duty. The regiment left Ohio in November 1861 for Louisville, Kentucky. From there, they were posted in a number of Kentucky towns through February 1862, striving to keep the border state in the Union.

In late winter 1862 the regiment was attached to the 4th Brigade, 2nd Division, Army of the Ohio, serving in Tennessee under Don Carlos Buell at Shiloh. There, on April 7, the regiment became engaged at about 10 a.m., losing 2 men killed, 2 officers and 45 men wounded, and 1 man missing. Following Shiloh, the regiment served in Mississippi during the Siege of Corinth before moving to Tuscumbi, Florence, and Huntsville Alabama, June 10 - July 5. In August, the regiment returned to Kentucky (Louisville) as the army pursued Confederates under Braxton Bragg, fighting at the Battle of Perryville. The well-travelled regiment then marched to Nashville, Tennessee, in October and November. With the restructuring of the western army in November and the replacement of General Buell with William Rosecrans, the 1st OVI was assigned to the 3rd Brigade, 2nd Division, Right Wing XIV Army Corps, Army of the Cumberland. It stayed in Nashville until December 26, when the regiment departed for a short campaign that culminated in the Battle of Stones River.

For much of 1863, the 1st Ohio Infantry was stationed in Tennessee and assigned to the 3rd Brigade, 2nd Division, XX Corps, Army of the Cumberland, until October when the IV Corps was formed from the remnants of the heavily depleted XX Corps and XXI Corps. Under the command of Maj. Joab A. Stafford, the regiment saw action at the Battle of Chickamauga, a stinging defeat for Rosecrans' army. It marched to Knoxville as part of the army relieving the Confederate siege of Union forces at that city. Yet another reorganization of the army resulted in the 1st Ohio Infantry being assigned to the 2nd Brigade, 3rd Division, 4th Army Corps, Army of the Cumberland, until September 1864. It fought under Grant at Missionary Ridge, where it was the first regiment to plant its colors on the hilltop, and with Sherman in the Atlanta campaign. The regiment spent much of the rest of the fall on scouting duty in Tennessee.

The 1st Ohio Volunteer Infantry mustered out of the Union army from September 24 to October 14, 1864, when the 3-year term of enlistment expired. A number of recruits re-enlisted and transferred to the 18th Ohio Volunteer Infantry on October 31, 1864, and remained on duty through the end of the Civil War.

The regiment lost during its service 5 officers and 116 enlisted men killed and mortally wounded in combat and 130 enlisted men by disease (a total of 251 fatalities). It was engaged in 24 battles and skirmishes, lost 527 men in action, and marched 2,500 miles. Following the war, the veterans erected a monument on the Shiloh National Military Park. The regiment is also commemorated on the Soldiers' and Sailors' Monument in Public Square in downtown Cleveland. The tattered battle flags of both the three-months and three-years regiments (as well as the guidon of Company B, the Lafayette Guards) are preserved in the museum of the Ohio Historical Society in Columbus.

Another "1st Ohio Volunteer Infantry" (unrelated to the Civil War regiment) existed in the Mexican–American War. Still another regiment of the same name was organized April 26, 1898, for duty in the Spanish–American War.

== Affiliations, battle honors, detailed service, and casualties ==
=== Organizational affiliation ===
Attached to:

- Three-month regiment attached to Schenck's Brigade, Tyler's Division, McDowell's Army of Northeast Virginia to August 1861
- Three-year regiment independent duty in Kentucky until February, 1862
- 4th Brigade, 2nd Division, Army of the Ohio (AoO), to September, 1862
- 4th Brigade, 2nd Division, I Corps, AoO, to November 1862.
- 3rd Brigade, 2nd Division, Right Wing, XIV Corps, Army of the Cumberland (AoC), to January 1863.
- 3rd Brigade, 2nd Division, XX Corps, AoC, to October 1863.
- 2nd Brigade, 3rd Division, IV Corps, AoC, to September 1864.

=== List of battles ===
The official list of battles in which the regiment bore a part:

- Battle of Vienna
- First Battle of Bull Run
- Battle of Shiloh
- Siege of Corinth
- Battle of Stones River
- Tullahoma Campaign
- Battle of Chickamauga
- Chattanooga campaign
- Battle of Missionary Ridge
- Battle of Rocky Face Ridge
- Battle of Resaca
- Battle of Adairsville
- Battle of Pickett's Mill
- Battle of Kennesaw Mountain
- Battle of Pace's Ferry

=== Detailed service ===
==== 1861 ====
- Mustered into federal service April 17, 1861
- Moved to Washington, DC, April 19
- Duty in the defenses of that city to July
- Actions at Vienna, VA June 17 and July 9
- McDowell's advance on Manassas, VA, July 16–21
- Occupation of Fairfax Court House, VA, July 17
- Battle of Bull Run, July 21
- Cover retreat to Washington
- Ordered to Ohio and mustered out August 2, 1861, expiration of term
- Three year regiment organized at Camp Corwin, Dayton, OH, August 5-October 30, 1861
- Mustered into federal service October 12, 1861
- Moved to Cincinnati, OH, October 31
- To Louisville, KY, November 5
- To West Point, KY, November 8
- Moved to Elizabethtown and Camp Nevin, KY, November 15–16
- Camp at Bacon Creek and Green River, KY, until February, 1862

==== 1862 ====
- March to Nashville, TN, February 14–25
- Occupation of Nashville February 25-March 16
- March to Duck River March 16–21
- March to Savannah, TN, March 31-April 6
- Battle of Shiloh, April 6–7
- Advance on and Siege of Corinth, MS, April 29-May 30
- Duty at Corinth util June 10
- Moved to Iuka, MS
- To Tuscumbia, Florence, and Huntsville, AL, June 10-July 5
- Duty at Boulay Fork until August 30
- Expedition to Tullahoma, TN July 14–18
- March to Pelham August 24
- To Altamont, August 28
- Reconnaissance toward Sequatchie Valley, August 29–30
- March to Louisville, KY, in pursuit of Bragg August 30-September 26
- Pursuit of Bragg into Kentucky October 1–17
- Lawrenceburg October 8
- Dog Walk, Perryville, October 9
- March to Nashville, TN, October 17-November 7
- Duty there until December 26
- Kimbrough's Mills, Mill Creek, December 6
- Advance on Murfreesboro, TN December 26–30
- Battle of Stones River December 30, 1862 - January 3, 1863

==== 1863 ====
- Duty at and near Murfreesboro until June
- Actions at Woodbury, TN, January 24 and April 4
- Middle Tennessee or Tullahoma Campaign June 23-July 7
- Battle of Liberty Gap
- Occupation of Middle Tennessee until August 16
- Passage of Cumberland Mountains and Tennessee River, and Chickamauga Campaign August 16-September 22
- Battle of Chickamauga September 19–20
- Siege of Chattanooga, TN, September 24-November 23
- Reopening Tennessee River October 26–29
- Battle of Brown's Ferry October 27
- Chattanooga-Ringgold Campaign November 23–27
- Orchard Knob November 23–24
- Battle of Missionary Ridge November 25
- March to relief of Knoxville, TN, November 28-December 8
- East Tennessee Campaign December, 1863-January, 1864

==== 1864 ====
- About Dandridge, TN January 16–17
- Operations in East Tennessee until April
- Atlanta Campaign May 1 to July 25
- Demonstration on Rocky Faced Ridge and Dalton May 8–13
- Battle of Resaca May 14–15
- Adairsville May 17
- Near Kingston May 18–19
- Near Cassville May 19
- Advance on Dallas May 22–25
- Operations on line of Pumpkin Vine Creek and battles about Dallas, New Hope Church and Allatoona Hills May 25-June 5
- Operations about Marietta and against Kennesaw Mountain June 10-July 2
- Pine Hill June 11–14
- Lost Mountain June 15–17
- Assault on Kennesaw June 27
- Ruff's Station July 4
- Chattahoochie River July 5–17
- Peach Tree Creek July 19–20
- Siege of Atlanta July 22–26
- Ordered to the rear for muster out
- Scout from Whiteside, TN, to Sulphur Springs September 2–5 (Detachment)
- Mustered out September 24 to October 14
- Recruits transferred to 18th Ohio Volunteer Infantry October 31

=== Casualties ===
The regiment lost a total of 251 men during service; 5 officers and 116 enlisted men killed or mortally wounded, 130 enlisted men died of disease.

== See also ==
- List of Ohio Civil War units
- Ohio in the Civil War
