= William Bell Jr. (politician) =

American politician from Ohio

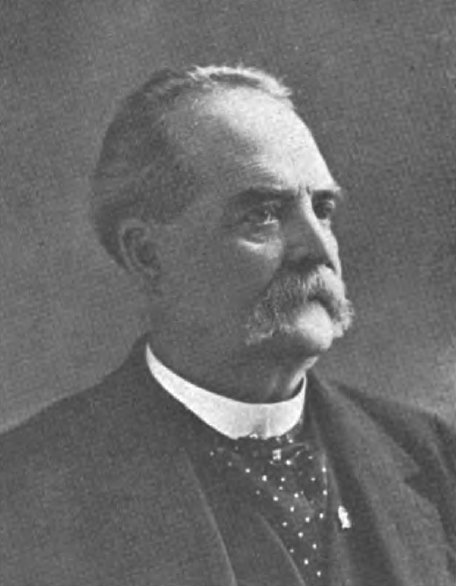

20th Ohio Secretary of State
- In office January 11, 1875 – January 8, 1877
- Governor: William Allen; Rutherford B. Hayes
- Preceded by: Allen T. Wikoff
- Succeeded by: Milton Barnes

Personal details
- Born: August 23, 1828 Utica, Ohio, US
- Died: July 16, 1902 (aged 73) Newark, Ohio, US
- Resting place: Green Lawn Cemetery, Columbus, Ohio
- Party: Democratic
- Spouse: Lizzie O. Ochletree
- Children: Three

William Bell Jr. (August 23, 1828 – July 16, 1902) was a Democratic politician in the U.S. state of Ohio who held many local offices, served in the Ohio House of Representatives, and was Ohio Secretary of State 1875–1877.

== Biography ==
William Bell Jr. was born in Utica, Ohio, in 1828. He attended the common schools and the Martinsburg Academy. He was elected Licking County Sheriff in 1852 and served two years. He was appointed postmaster of Newark in July 1855 by Franklin Pierce, and re-appointed by James Buchanan in 1856. Bell was again elected sheriff in 1858, serving four years, and elected county auditor in 1863, serving seven years.

Bell was elected to represent Licking County in the Ohio House of Representatives in 1871 and re-elected in 1873 to the 60th and 61st General Assemblies. He resigned when he was elected later in 1874 to Ohio Secretary of State, defeating incumbent Republican Allen T. Wikoff. He served two years but was defeated for re-election by Milton Barnes.

Bell was appointed Commissioner of Railroads and Telegraphs in 1878 and served two years. In 1881, he was elected from Franklin County to the legislature and served two years in the 65th General Assembly. He returned to Newark, and was elected mayor in 1892, and served two years. He was again elected auditor in 1894 and served six years. He returned to the House of Representatives in 1900-1903 for the 74th and 75 General Assemblies.

Bell was a Campbellite.

Bell was married to Lizzie O. Ochletree, of Newark, on January 1, 1856. Their children were Sam C., Virginia M., and Maggie O.

Political offices
| Preceded by Allen T. Wikoff | Secretary of State of Ohio; 1875–1877 | Succeeded by Milton Barnes |
Ohio House of Representatives
| Preceded by William Parr | Representative from Licking County; 1872-1874; Served alongside: William D. Smith | Succeeded by William D. Smith |
| Preceded by John C. Groom, Benjamin L. Reese, W. T. Wallace | Representative from Franklin County; 1882-1883; Served alongside: Benjamin L. Reese, J. B. Hall | Succeeded by Casper Loewenstein, Allen O. Myers; E. W. Young |
| Preceded by S. S. Williams | Representative from Licking County; 1900-1902 | Succeeded by Charles D. Watkins |
