= Wadsworth, Kansas =

Unincorporated community in Kansas, U.S.

Coordinates: 39°16′42″N 94°54′01″W

Wadsworth was an unincorporated community in Delaware Township, Leavenworth County, Kansas, United States. It is part of the Kansas City metropolitan area.

== History ==
In this area, on land granted by the city of Leavenworth, the Western Branch, National Home for Disabled Volunteer Soldiers (NHDVS), began construction in 1885. In 1886 a post office opened that was named "National Military Home" (as was the Santa Fe Railway station). In 1932 the post office was renamed "Veterans Administration Home".

In 1936 the post office was renamed "Wadsworth". (The railroad station was also renamed "Wadsworth".) Wadsworth was the surname of two unrelated NHDVS officials: Maj. James Wolcott Wadsworth Sr. (1846–1926), a former Congressman who served on the NHDVS Board of Managers 1906-26 (and was the board's President 1907–14), and Col. Charles W. Wadsworth (1865–1943), who was General Treasurer of NHDVS 1915–30, then (after NHDVS became part of the newly created VA) Director of the VA's Bureau of National Homes. In 1963 the Wadsworth Post Office was assigned Zip Code 66089.

In 1971, about the time that the area was annexed by the city of Leavenworth, the post office lost the Wadsworth name and became the Veterans Administration Center station of the Leavenworth P.O. The hospital was renamed the Dwight D. Eisenhower VA Medical Center and the cemetery became Leavenworth National Cemetery. A new domiciliary was built in 1995 west of the medical center, and the old domiciliaries were vacant until 2006, when they began being converted to veterans' apartments as the Eisenhower Ridge project.
