= Timothy Robbins Stanley =

- Born: May 14, 1810; Hartford County, Connecticut
- Died: July 6, 1874 (aged 64); Chattanooga, Tennessee
- Burial place: Chattanooga National Cemetery
- Military career
- Allegiance: Union
- Branch: Union Army
- Service years: 1861–65
- Rank: Colonel; Brevet Brigadier General
- Commands: 18th Ohio Infantry
- Conflicts: American Civil War: Siege of Nashville; Battle of Stones River; Tullahoma Campaign; Battle of Stones River; Battle of Chickamauga
- Other work: Represented Lawrence County in the Ohio Legislature 1846 Member of the Ohio Senate 1860-1861; Leading member of the company that built the Eagle furnace Lawyer, Stanley, Henderson & Wheeler Founder and vice-president, First National Bank

Timothy Robbins Stanley (Hartford, Connecticut, May 14, 1810 – July 8, 1874) was a colonel of the 18th Ohio Infantry during the American Civil War. He was brevetted brigadier general, US Volunteers, on March 13, 1865, for "gallant and meritorious services during the war". He commanded a brigade at the Battle of Stones River.

== Sources ==
- Cozzens, Peter (1991) [1990]. No Better Place to Die: The Battle of Stones River. Urbana, Illinois: University of Illinois Press. ISBN 0-252-06229-9.
