= 41st Ohio Infantry Regiment =

- Active: 1861–1864
- Country: United States
- Allegiance: Union
- Branch: Union Army
- Type: Infantry Regiment
- Size: 950 soldiers at outset of the war
- Engagements: Battle of Shiloh; Battle of Murfreesboro; Battle of Chickamauga

Commanders
- Notable commanders: William B. Hazen

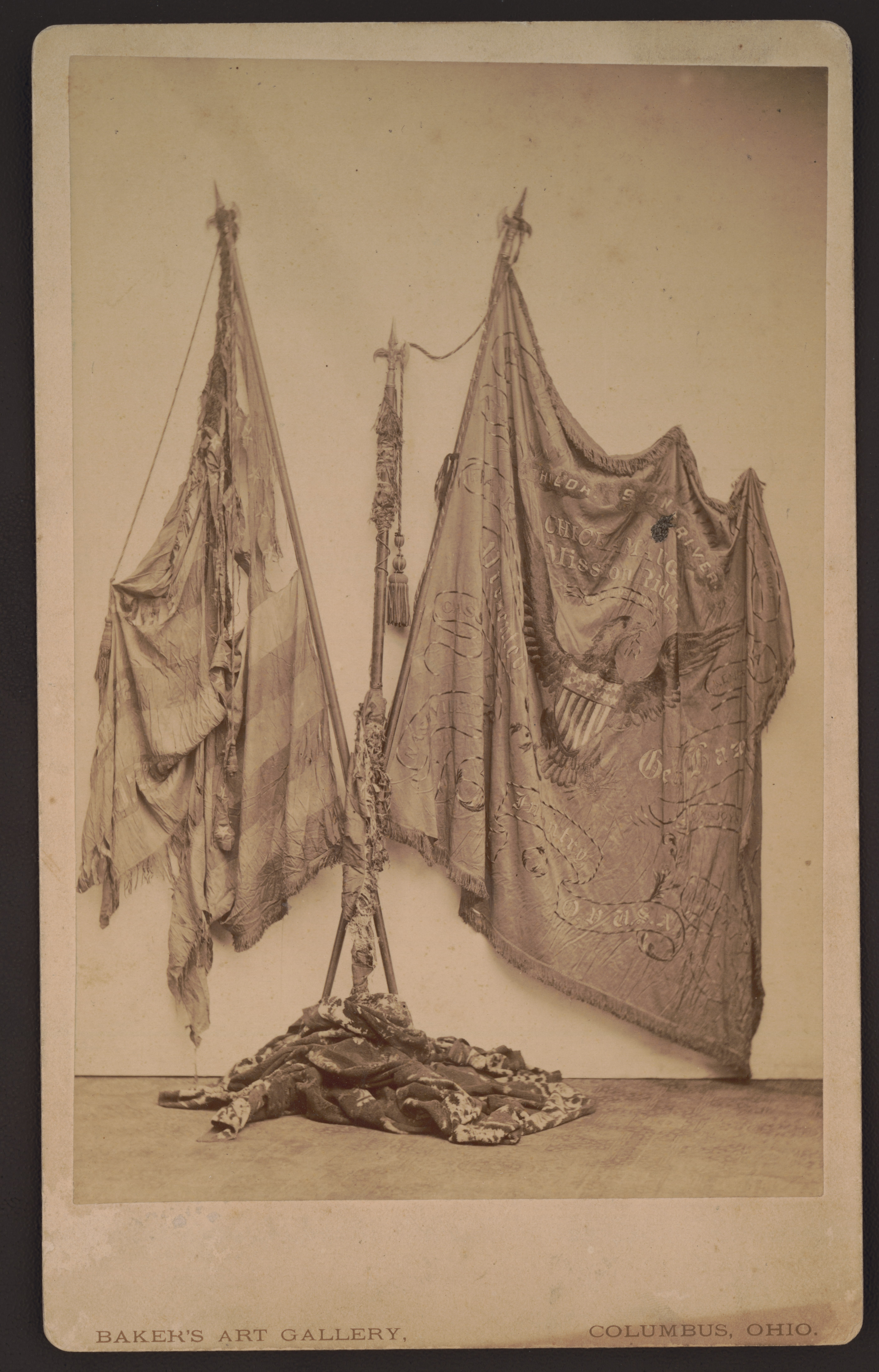
Regimental flags of 41st Ohio Infantry

The 41st Ohio Infantry Regiment was an infantry regiment in the Union Army during the American Civil War.

The regiment served in the Western Theatre for the entire war, under such well-known generals as Grant and Sherman. It fought in many battles over the course of four years, suffering more than 300 casualties. It earned a reputation among the hardscrabble Western units for its spit and polish, and was often held as an example of good soldiering. The Medal of Honor was newly established at the start of the Civil War, and over 1,500 Federal troops were awarded it during the conflict. Two of them were in the 41st Ohio Infantry.

== Organization and early service ==
Much of the success of the 41st Ohio Infantry Regiment was due to the abilities of its initial commander, William Babcock Hazen. Hazen, a graduate of West Point, was a professional soldier in the Regular Army before the war. Though initially the volunteers felt he was too harsh and dictatorial, once battle was joined, their opinions rose along with their success. Hazen had grown up in northeastern Ohio near Hiram, and returned to that area in fall of 1861 to raise a volunteer regiment. The regiment organized at Camp Wood in Cleveland with much of August through October spent organizing and drilling. On October 29, 1861, the regiment mustered into service for a term of three years.

In November 1861, the regiment moved to Louisville, Kentucky, then on to Camp Wickliffe to join its brigade. Once arrived, it was organized as part of the 15th Brigade, 4th Division, Army of the Ohio, under Maj. Gen. Don Carlos Buell. Shortly after arriving, some of the men carried out a scouting expedition into western Virginia.

In January 1862, the regiment was finally armed by the State of Ohio. Prior to this, the men were using whatever weapons they may have brought from home or acquired on their own. The official issue weapons were a great disappointment to the men, however, as they were provided with "Greenwood Rifles"; cast off older muskets and rifles that had been reconditioned and rebored by Miles Greenwood & Co. of Cincinnati, Ohio. While the weapons were functional and would serve the men in battle, they felt they were unreliable and inaccurate. Because of this, the men sought to replace these weapons whenever an opportunity arose.

== Battle of Shiloh ==
Early in 1862, General Grant and General Buell were advancing south through Kentucky toward Nashville, Tennessee, with Grant on the western side of the Tennessee River, and Buell on the eastern side. Confederate General Albert Sidney Johnston's Army of Tennessee was moving to oppose this advance, and Johnson chose to strike before the two Union armies could join together. He chose to attack Grant's formations on the western bank, near Pittsburg Landing and a small chapel called Shiloh Church. Johnson began his attack just before dawn on April 6, 1862.

The regiment was with Buell's army on the eastern bank of the river. Prior to the battle, Colonel Hazen had been promoted to command of the 19th Brigade in the Army of the Ohio, of which the 41st Ohio Infantry was one of three regiments (the others being the 9th Indiana under Colonel Moody, and the 6th Kentucky under Colonel Whitaker). Of these three regiments, the 41st Ohio Infantry was the smallest, having been reduced to 371 active duty men through sickness and incapacitation during their months of training and marching. Above Hazen in the chain of command was Brigadier General William "Bull" Nelson, in charge of the 4th Division, in the vanguard of the advance toward the action at Pittsburg Landing. For most of April 6, the division was stopped eight miles away from the river crossing to Pittsburg Landing, waiting for promised local guides who could help them find their way through the swampy ground in front of them. Though some could hear the battle raging, at that time they could not tell if it was a major engagement or merely a skirmish.

In the afternoon of April 6, a local pro-Union resident was found to guide the division forward, and the advance finally started. Unfortunately, the difficult march through a narrow track in the swamp caused the division to become strung out and widely separated. At 5 p.m. the lead elements arrived at the crossing point on the east bank of the river. Across the river chaos ensued, with roughly 10,000 to 15,000 disorganized Union troops milling about seeking a way to escape the Confederate attack that was in the process of smashing the Federal lines on the west bank. Desperate to begin moving his men across the river, Nelson commandeered any floating craft he could and pressed them into service, shuttling men of the 4th Division to the west bank. Despite his best efforts, however, by the time Johnson and his Confederates launched their final attacks around 6 p.m., only about 500 men of the division had made it across. The rest, still working their way out of the swamp, began to stack up on the eastern bank, waiting for transport. Among the stranded troops were Hazen's brigade and the 41st Ohio Infantry.

After nightfall, under the light of torches and bonfires, the shuttling of troops across the river continued. To make matters worse for the demoralized Federal troops, rain began to fall. The regiment crossed the river in the night and moved to take up its assigned position not far from the river, to the right of the 4th Division. Not long after finding their place, the troops began to prepare for a pre-dawn counterattack against the Confederates. At 5 a.m., the troops stepped off.

Due to inexperience and rough ground, the troops had to pause frequently to adjust their alignment. They crossed over Dill's Creek, and began to come across corpses from the previous day's fighting. They advanced cautiously through the underbrush to the edge of Cloud Field, near a set of ancient Indian mounds. The division soon came upon Confederate pickets, drove them back, and at about 6 a.m., began to come under artillery fire. The division halted while Federal artillery was brought up to support them. Hazen's 19th Brigade then charged the Confederate batteries across an open field (Wicker's and Sarah Bell's fields), taking heavy losses. It was now around 9 a.m.

Upon reaching the enemy guns, the Confederate forces counterattacked with infantry and drove the 19th Brigade back across the fields. Captain Terrel's Fifth Artillery, having just landed at Pittsburg Landing, was rushed forward to support the hard pressed 4th Division. The Fifth Artillery placed their guns in a favorable, though exposed position, and began an accurate fire into the enemy's flanks. The Confederate attack faltered under this new bombardment. Captain Terrel's guns, however, attracted the attention of the Confederate troops, and were soon forced to withdraw. Here the attack faltered and paused. About noon, the 4th Division was reinforced by a regiment from another division and attacked once again (in cooperation with Gen. Crittenden's division), forcing the Confederates out of their positions, overrunning several batteries and capturing their guns.

Over the course of this first engagement for the regiment, nearly half of the regiment became casualties (24 men killed, 110 wounded, and 1 missing in action). It was, by any measure, a difficult introduction to what they would see for the next three years of war.

== Medals of Honor ==
During the assault of the Confederate positions at Nashville in 1864, the regiment found itself in an untenable position and was forced to withdraw. Several men, who had crawled through the enemy's outer defenses, found themselves trapped in a no-man's land between the abatis and the trenches. One of these men chose to leap into the trenches at that point and was captured. Others simply hugged close to the ground, and waited for the attack to resume. Two men chose to watch for an opportunity and, when the morale of the Confederate forces began to waver, these men leaped to their feet, raced into the trenches, and managed to capture several prisoners, two battle flags, and four artillery pieces. The regiment soon arrived on the scene to reinforce this attack. For this effort, two men were awarded the Medal Of Honor in 1865.

=== Garrett, William ===
Rank and organization: Sergeant, Company G, 41st Ohio Infantry. Place and date: At Nashville, Tenn., 16 December 1864. Entered service at:------. Birth: England. Date of issue: 24 February 1865. Citation: With several companions dashed forward, the first to enter the enemy's works, taking possession of 4 pieces of artillery and captured the flag of the 13th Mississippi Infantry (C.S.A.).

=== Holcomb, Daniel I. ===
Rank and organization: Private, Company A, 41st Ohio Infantry. Place and date: At Brentwood Hills, Tenn., 16 December 1864. Entered service at: ------. Birth: Hartford, Ohio. Date of issue. 22 February 1865. Citation. Capture of Confederate guidon.

== Outline and timeline of service ==
=== 1862 - First engagements ===
- January - The initial equipping of the regiment concluded. The men were issued primarily older Federal issue muskets, many of which were smoothbores which had been converted to rifles (the so-called "Greenwood Rifle").
- February - advanced to Nashville, Tennessee. Reorganized to 19th Brigade, Army of the Ohio.
- April - first engagement at Pittsburgh Landing (Shiloh) in Tennessee, losing severely.
- May - advance to and siege of Corinth, Mississippi.
- June - pursuit of rebel forces to Booneville, Mississippi then marched on to Athens, Alabama.
- July - rested at Athens, Alabama.
- August through October - pursuit of Gen. Bragg's forces into Kentucky.
- October - Battle of Perryville, Kentucky, the regiment was limited to skirmishing on the picket line.
- November - reorganized to 2nd Brigade, 2nd Division, Left Wing 14th Army Corps, Army of the Cumberland. Remained with the Army of the Cumberland until 1865.
- December - Battle of Murfreesboro (Stone's River) in Tennessee, the Regiment lost about 73 of its force

=== 1863 - The fight for Tennessee ===
- January - reorganized to 2nd Brigade, 2nd Division, 21st Army Corps, Army of the Cumberland.
- Spring - Occupation duty in Tennessee. The regiment is issued new Springfield Model 1861 rifles, to replace the older converted smoothbores.
- June - Middle Tennessee (or Tullahoma) Campaign
- August - passage through the Cumberland Mountains and across the Tennessee River; reorganized to 2nd Brigade, 3rd Division, 4th Army Corps, Army of the Cumberland.
- September - Battle of Chickamauga, Georgia, losing heavily.
- October - Battle of Wauhatchie (also known as Brown's Ferry)
- September through November - siege of Chattanooga, Tennessee. Complemented by General Thomas at Battle of Missionary Ridge.
- December - march to relief of Knoxville, Tennessee.

=== 1864 - The push through Georgia ===
- January - Regiment reenlists as Veteran Volunteers, and gets 30 days leave in Ohio.
- Spring - Operations in Eastern Tennessee.
- May through September - Atlanta campaign with General Sherman, losing more or less heavily in the various encounters, including Battle of Kennesaw Mountain in June, and the siege of Atlanta in July.
- Fall - pursuit of General Hood in North Georgia into North Alabama.
- December - Battle of Nashville, where two members of the regiment were cited and received the Medal of Honor.

=== 1865 - The war draws to a close ===
- January through March - occupation of Huntsville, Alabama.
- April through June - operations in and around Nashville, Tennessee.
- June - the Regiment was ordered to San Antonio, Texas, via New Orleans. At 2 a.m. on June 19, the steamer the regiment was travelling on (Echo Number 2) collided with an anchored ironclad monitor (identified in records as the USS Oneida, but probably the USS Oneota) near Cairo, Illinois, and sank in just 10 minutes. Everyone on board escaped to the monitor, but all of the company records, stores, and ordnance were lost.
- November - mustered out at San Antonio, Texas

=== Losses ===
- 8 Officers and 168 Enlisted men killed and mortally wounded
- 1 Officer and 153 Enlisted men by disease
- Total deaths 330

== See also ==
- Cleveland in the Civil War
