= Laura E. Howey =

American educator, librarian, temperance leader (1851–1911)

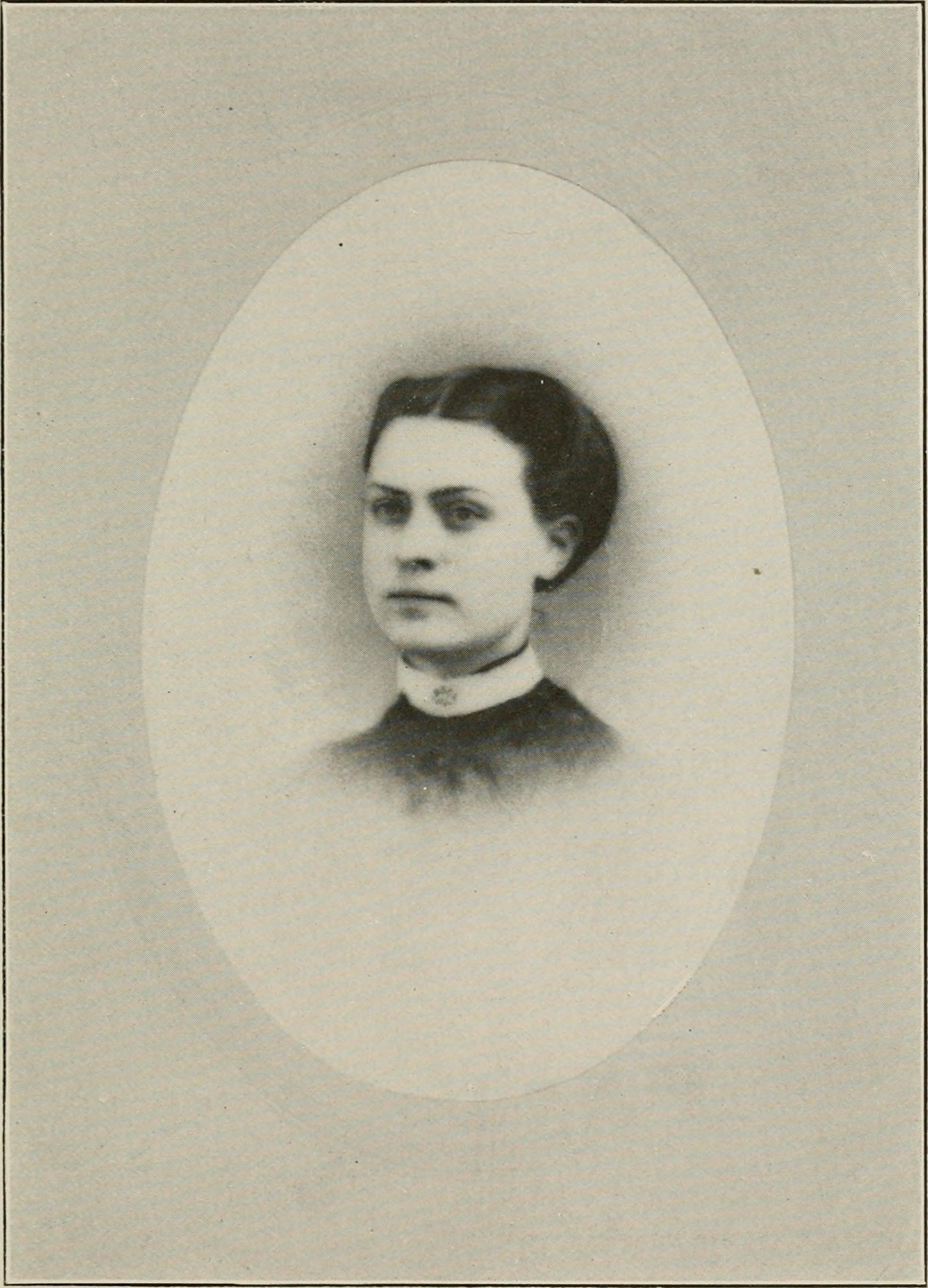
- Born: Laura E. Spencer; August 17, 1851; Cadiz, Ohio, U.S.
- Died: September 21, 1911 (aged 60); Helena, Montana, U.S.
- Occupations: Educator; librarian; temperance leader
- Known for: President, Montana State Woman's Christian Temperance Union; Librarian, Montana State Historical and Miscellaneous Library

Laura E. Howey (née, Spencer; 1851–1911) was an American educator, librarian, and temperance leader. She taught at Harlem Springs College (Harlem Springs, Ohio) and Montana Wesleyan University (Helena, Montana), and served as President of the Montana State Woman's Christian Temperance Union (WCTU) (1885–90). It was as librarian of the Montana State Historical and Miscellaneous Library that Howey did her greatest work, and through which she became more generally known through the state. She occupied that position for nine years, from 1898 to 1907, and during that time, the library achieved a prominent status among the historical libraries of the U.S. She was indefatigable in the collection of materials dealing with the early history of Montana.

== Early life ==
Laura E. Spencer was born in Cadiz, Ohio, August 17, 1851. Her father, Daniel Fenner Spencer (born 1826), was of English descent, the Spencer family having come to America in Colonial days, settling in Connecticut and New York. Her mother, Martha Jane (Pritchard) (born 1829), was of French Huguenot ancestry. The original family members were silk manufacturers expelled from France. They went to England and Scotland, from there to Maryland some time before 1700, then to Ohio about 1802. Daniel was graduated as a civil engineer and surveyor, but later studied law with Secretary Edwin Stanton in Cadiz. Daniel died while still a young man, leaving his wife with two young children. She at once began teaching school in Ohio. She was a well read woman and her children were reared in the atmosphere of books and music.

The family was represented in every war from Revolutionary times down to the Spanish–American War, and also in prominent public positions, notably John Canfield Spencer in President John Tyler's Cabinet, and Judge Rufus W. Peckham, of the United States Supreme bench.

Laura's grandparents in Maryland, the Laceys, were slave owners. On their removal to Ohio, their slaves were taken with them. After their arrival in Ohio, they gave freedom and land to their slaves, who settled near the Lacey home. Subsequently, the Laceys became strong anti-slavery people and maintained an "Underground Railroad station" to assist fugitive slaves into Canada.

Two of the old homesteads were still owned by the family after nearly 100 years of occupancy by some branch of the descendants.

== Education ==
After her graduation from the high school in her native town, Howey was sent to Beaver College at Beaver, Pennsylvania, which was at that time one of the foremost colleges for women. Here, she took a three years' course, including music, French and elocution, besides the full course in mathematics and mental, moral and natural science, graduating in 1868. The students were afforded excellent opportunities of attending high-class concerts and lectures in Pittsburgh.

== Career ==
While teaching in Harlem Springs College (now Scio College), in Ohio, she met Prof. Robert H. Howey (1842–1928), also an instructor in the college, and on March 14, 1870, in Harrison, Ohio, they were married. She was at that time of their marriage, and for several years after, engaged in teaching instrumental and vocal music. However, the all-round preparation at college proved invaluable in later years, as she taught every branch included in the curriculum of the college.

In 1879, the Howeys came to the Montana Territory to engage in school work, and then began Laura Howey's best efforts along educational lines. During the first winter in Helena, Montana, H.M.S. Pinafore, the first opera ever given in Montana, was presented under her management, and nearly US$700 was realized for the public school and the Helena Library Association. This entertainment was followed by a cantata and by different school performances, the proceeds of which were used to purchase books and pictures for the school.

"This year has been so fraught with grand results in legislative work... Through our aid a bill was passed prohibiting the sale or circulation of obscene literature. Altogether we feel proud of results. . . . The fact that our women trudged around in one of the deepest snows Montana has ever had to circulate petitions and hold prayer-meetings, set the men to thinking, and even if the bills had been lost, the effort did us all good."
Mrs. L. E. Howey, President.

In 1883, largely through the influence of Frances Willard, whom she had met while teaching in Allegheny City, Pennsylvania, Howey took up WCTU work in Montana, and from 1885 to 1889/90, was president of the state organization. In 1891, she was appointed by Willard to represent the National WCTU at the Pan-Republican Congress held at Philadelphia. She represented the Montana WCTU in the National WCTU conventions held at Nashville, Tennessee and Chicago, Illinois.

Howey was an Alternate Lady Manager of the World's Columbian Exposition (Chicago, 1893), and had charge of the Montana Women's Department.

Howey was one of the organizers of the Working Woman's Home in Helena, and for a number of years, was a member of the Relief Society of Helena, looking after the poor and visiting the prisons. For some years, she was actively engaged as treasurer of the town charity committee. Out of this grew the Associated Charities. In 1893–94, Governor John E. Rickards appointed her a member of the State Board of Charity, and by the board, she was elected its Secretary. She visited all the public institutions of the State and reported on their condition to the Governor.

For several years, Howey was a trustee of the city library when it was a private organization. At the close of the year 1898, the board of trustees of the Montana State Historical and Miscellaneous Library elected Howey librarian, a position which she filled until June 1, 1907, From the first, her attention was directed toward the growth and usefulness of the institution. Howey mapped out the plan under which the institution would be conducted. She aroused not only a public spirit and an interest in the Society, but also created an influence in legislative circles which materialized into increased and generous appropriations.

Howey was a member of the faculty of the Montana Wesleyan University, and in addition to her duties as instructor, she enlarged and increased the usefulness of the school library.

== Personal life ==
Howey was a member of the Presbyterian Church of Helena.

In later life, Howey had not been in good health for a number of years. Laura E. Howey died as a result of heart trouble on September 21, 1911 at St. Peters Hospital, in Helena, Montana, at the age of 61. Burial was in Harlem Springs, Ohio.
