= Rupert R. Beetham =

American politician (1877–1933)

Rupert Rennison Beetham
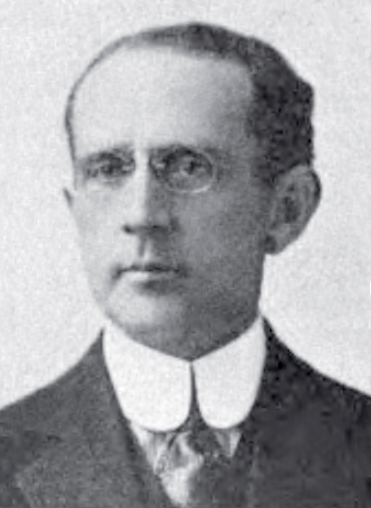
- Born: August 29, 1877; Greensburg, Ohio
- Died: May 5, 1933 (aged 55); Columbus, Ohio
- Resting place: Cadiz Union Cemetery, Cadiz, Ohio
- Education: Scio College; Ohio State University College of Law

Rupert Rennison Beetham (August 29, 1877 – May 5, 1933) was a Republican politician in the U.S. state of Ohio who was Speaker of the Ohio House of Representatives 1921–1922.

Beetham was born in Greensburg, Trumbull County, Ohio. He was educated at the Canton High School, Scio College and the Ohio State University School of Law. He lettered in Football at Ohio State in for the 1899 team with a record of 9–0–1.

Beetham was a lawyer, farmer, and teacher. He belonged to the Free Masons and the Knights of Pythias. He was a member of the School board of Cadiz Schools starting in 1904, and served as postmaster of Cadiz, Ohio from 1906–1914. He was married and lived in Cadiz. He was a Methodist.

He died at a Columbus hospital of complications of arteriosclerosis in 1933. He had been in declining health for several years. He was 55. He had previously been the prohibition director in the administration of governor Myers Y. Cooper. His funeral was held May 7, 1933 in Cadiz.

== Footnotes ==
Ohio House of Representatives
Preceded by Carl R. Kimball	Speaker of the Ohio House; 1921–1922	Succeeded by H. H. Griswold
