= O. C. Gray =

American politician (1871 – 1955)

O. C. Gray (October 10, 1871 – June 21, 1955) was a politician in Ohio. He served as Speaker of the Ohio House of Representatives.

He was born in Belmont County, Ohio. He attended Scio College and the University of Michigan. A Republican and a Methodist he served as auditor and tax assessor. First elected in 1922, he served four terms in the Ohio House. He lived in Cadiz, Ohio. He was succeeded as Speaker by Arthur Hamilton.
