= Archelaus D. Marsh =

American politician (1844–1904)

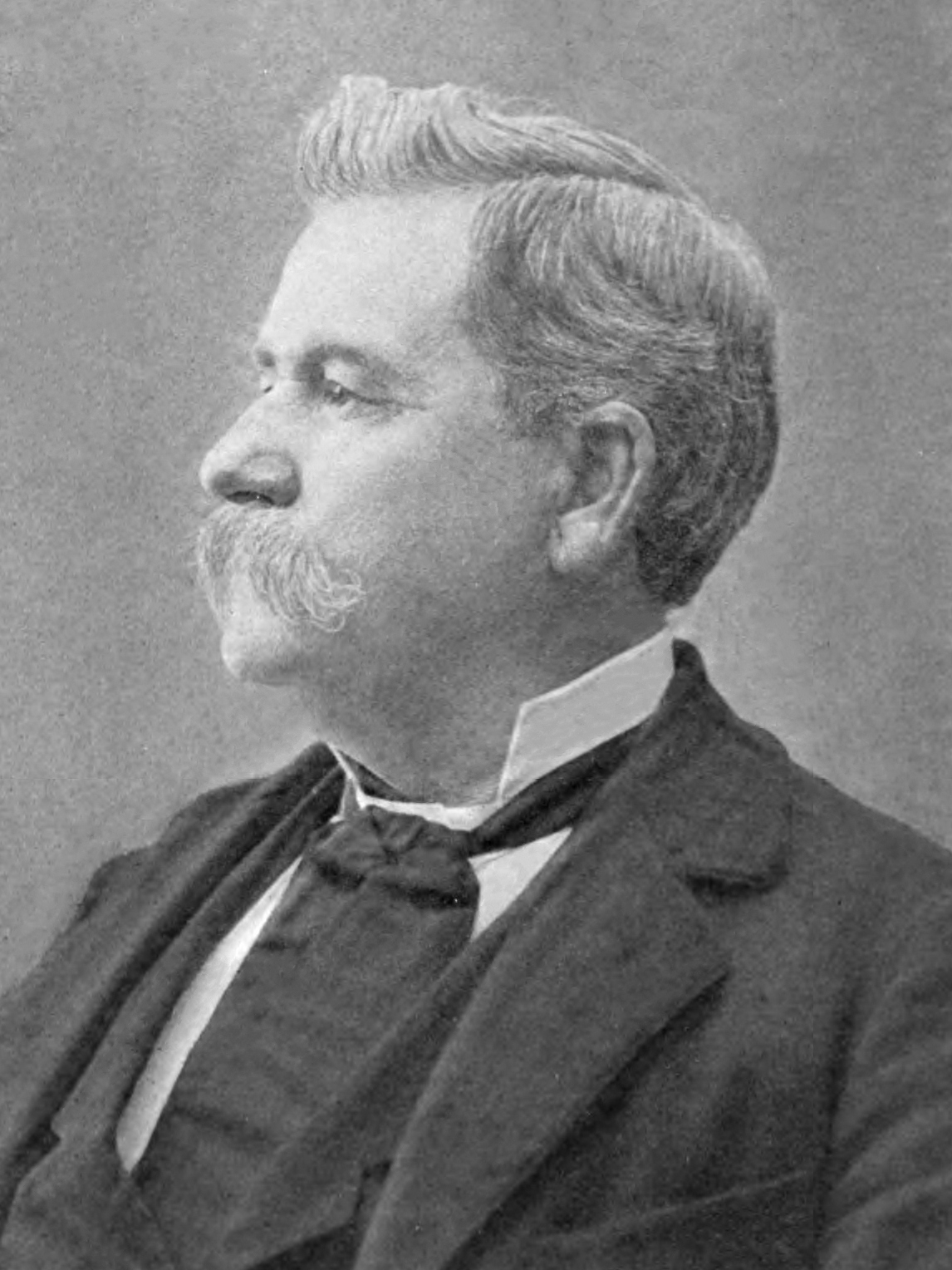

Speaker of the Ohio House of Representatives
- In office January 7, 1884 – January 3, 1886
- Preceded by: Orlando J. Hodge
- Succeeded by: John C. Entrekin

Personal details
- Born: April 19, 1844 Buford, Ohio
- Died: May 26, 1904 (aged 60) Celina, Ohio
- Party: Democratic
- Spouse: Mary Jane Thompson
- Children: nine
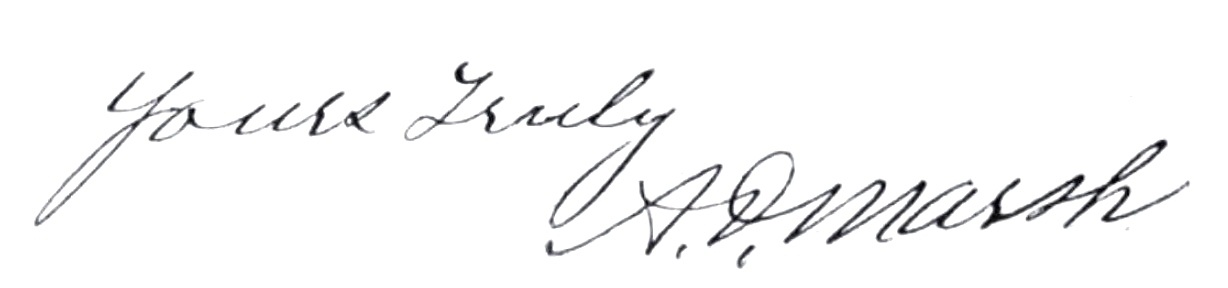
- Signature

Archelaus D. Marsh (1844–1904) was an American politician who served as Speaker of the Ohio House of Representatives during 1884 and 1885.

Archelaus D. Marsh was born April 19, 1844, on a farm near Buford, Highland County, Ohio. His parents were James P. and Ellen J. (Bachman) Marsh. His father was a native of Virginia and his mother of Pennsylvania, both born in 1812. His parents were married in 1842 in Hamilton, Ohio, and Archelaus D. was their only child.

Marsh lived on his parents' Highland County farm until 1868, when he moved to Sardinia, Brown County, Ohio, where he read law under the direction of W. W. McKnight and Chilton A. White. In 1872 Marsh was admitted to the bar in Georgetown, Ohio, and began the practice of law at Sardinia. He moved to Celina, Mercer County, Ohio, in October, 1874, and began a law practice there.

Marsh was elected to the Ohio House of Representatives in 1877, and was re-elected in 1879. He was elected again in 1883, and with the Democrats in the majority, he was selected as Speaker of the House for the sessions in 1884 and 1885.

In 1891, Marsh was a candidate for the Democratic nomination for Ohio's fourth congressional district. A long and bitter convention met at Greeneville for three days, adjourned for three weeks and met at Piqua for three days. With no result, new delegates were elected, and a convention met at Eaton for three more days, when Mr. Marsh withdrew, and Martin K. Gantz was finally nominated after about three thousand ballots.

Marsh was a delegate to the 1888 Democratic National Convention. He continued as a criminal defense lawyer, before turning his energies toward representing railroad companies.

Archelaus D. Marsh was married to Mary Jane Thompson of Highland County in 1865. They had children named Clayton, Clara, Nora, Vernie, Clarence, Arvesta, and Loree, and two who died in infancy. Marsh was a Freemason.

Marsh suddenly died of an "attack of heart trouble" in 1904.

== Sources ==
- A Portrait and Biographical Record of Mercer and Van Wert Counties, Ohio... A W Bowen & Co. 1896.
- Ohio General Assembly (1917). Manual of legislative practice in the General Assembly. State of Ohio.

Ohio House of Representatives
Preceded by George W. Raudabaugh	Representative from Mercer County; 1878-1881	Succeeded by William F. Miller
Preceded by William F. Miller	Representative from Mercer County; 1884-1885	Succeeded by Charles M. LeBlond
