= Electoral history of John Sherman =

List of elections featuring John Sherman as a candidate

Electoral history of John Sherman, Representative, United States Senator, and cabinet member.

== United States House of Representatives ==
Ohio's 13th congressional district, 1854:

- John Sherman (AN: 8,617 (59.80%)
- William D. Lindsley (D): 5,794 (40.21%)

Ohio's 13th congressional district, 1856:

- John Sherman (inc.) (R): 9,926 (58.42%)
- Herman J. Brumback (D): 7,065 (41.58%)

Ohio's 13th congressional district, 1858:

- John Sherman (R) (inc.): 9,426 (57.06%)
- Shepard J. Patrick (D): 7,095 (42.95%)

Ohio's 13th congressional district, 1860:

- John Sherman (R) (inc.): 11,428 (57.16%)
- Barnabas Burns (D): 8,564 (42.84%)

== United States Senate ==
United States Senate election in Ohio, 1861 (elected by state legislature):

- John Sherman (R) (inc.): 76 (58.91%)
- William Kennon, Sr. (D): 53 (41.09%)

United States Senate election in Ohio, 1866 (elected by state legislature):

- John Sherman (R) (inc.): 91 (68.93%)
- Allen G. Thurman (D): 41 (31.07%)

United States Senate election in Ohio, 1872 (elected by state legislature):

- John Sherman (R) (inc.): 73 (52.14%)
- George W. Morgan (D): 64 (45.71%)
- Jacob Dolson Cox (R): 1 (0.71%)
- Robert C. Schenck (R): 1 (0.71%)
- Aaron F. Perry (R) : 1 (0.71%)

United States Senate election in Ohio, 1881 (elected by state legislature):

- John Sherman (R) (inc.): 84 (61.76%)
- Allen G. Thurman (D): 52 (38.24%)

United States Senate election in Ohio, 1886 (elected by state legislature):

- John Sherman (R) (inc.): 84 (57.53%)
- Allen G. Thurman (D): 62 (42.47%)

United States Senate election in Ohio, 1892 (elected by state legislature):

- John Sherman (R) (inc.): 111 (75%)
- James E. Neal (D): 37 (25%)

== Sources ==
- Sherman, John (1895). Recollections of Forty years in the House, Senate and Cabinet. Chicago, Illinois: The Werner Company.
- Smith, Joseph Patterson (1898). History of the Republican Party in Ohio. Vol. 1. Chicago, Illinois: Lewis Publishing Co.
