= Hysell =

Hysell is a surname. Notable people with the surname include:

- Andrew Hysell (born 1971), American lawyer, public policy consultant, and politician
- Cliff Hysell (c. 1942–2014), American football player and coach
- Nial R. Hysell (1854–1921), American politician
