= List of speakers of the Ohio House of Representatives =

Speaker of the Ohio House of Representatives

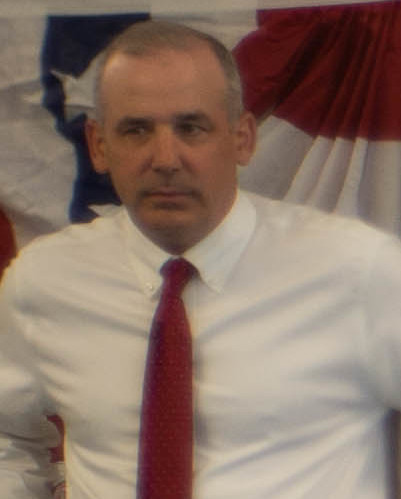
- Incumbent; Matt Huffman since January 6, 2025
- Style: The Honorable
- Appointer: Elected by the Ohio House of Representatives
- Inaugural holder: Michael Baldwin
- Succession: Third

The speaker of the Ohio House of Representatives is the presiding officer of the Ohio House of Representatives. The Speaker is third in line to the Office of the Governor.

Term	Name	Party	Home county
March 1, 1803 – December 4, 1803	Michael Baldwin	Democratic-Republican	Ross
December 5, 1803 – December 2, 1804	Elias Langham	Democratic-Republican	Ross
December 3, 1804 – December 1, 1805	Michael Baldwin (2)	Democratic-Republican	Ross
December 2, 1805 – November 30, 1806	John Sloane	Democratic-Republican	Jefferson
December 1, 1806 – December 6, 1807	Abraham Shepherd	Democratic-Republican	Adams
December 7, 1807 – December 4, 1808	Philemon Beecher	Democratic-Republican	Fairfield
December 5, 1808 – December 3, 1809	Alexander Campbell	Democratic-Republican	Adams
December 4, 1809 – December 1, 1811	Edward Tiffin	Democratic-Republican	Ross
December 2, 1811 – December 6, 1812	Matthias Corwin	Democratic-Republican	Warren
December 7, 1812 – December 3, 1815	John Pollock		Clermont
December 4, 1815 – December 1, 1816	Matthias Corwin (2)	Democratic-Republican	Warren
December 2, 1816 – November 30, 1817	Thomas Kirker	Democratic-Republican	Adams
December 1, 1817 – December 6, 1818	Duncan McArthur	Democratic-Republican	Ross
December 7, 1818 – December 2, 1821	Joseph Richardson		Columbiana
December 3, 1821 – December 1, 1822	John Bigger	Democratic-Republican	Warren
December 2, 1822 – December 5, 1824	Joseph Richardson (2)		Columbiana
December 6, 1824 – December 4, 1825	Micajah T. Williams	Democratic	Hamilton
December 5, 1825 – December 3, 1826	William W. Irvin	Democratic	Fairfield
December 4, 1826 – December 2, 1827	David Higgins	Democratic	Butler
December 3, 1827 – December 6, 1829	Edward King	National Republican	Ross
December 7, 1829 – December 5, 1830	Thomas L. Hamer	Democratic	Brown
December 6, 1830 – December 4, 1831	James Martin Bell	Whig	Guernsey
December 5, 1831 – December 2, 1832	William Blackstone Hubbard	Whig	Belmont
December 3, 1832 – December 1, 1833	David T. Disney	Democratic	Hamilton
December 2, 1833 – November 30, 1834	John H. Keith	Democratic	Muskingum
December 1, 1834 – December 6, 1835	John M. Creed	Whig	Fairfield
December 7, 1835 – December 4, 1836	William Sawyer	Democratic	Montgomery
December 5, 1836 – December 3, 1837	William Medill	Democratic	Fairfield
December 4, 1837 – December 2, 1838	Charles Anthony	Whig	Clark
December 3, 1838 – December 1, 1839	James J. Faran	Democratic	Hamilton
December 2, 1839 – December 6, 1840	Thomas J. Buchanan	Democratic	Clermont
December 7, 1840 – December 5, 1841	Seabury Ford	Whig	Geauga
December 6, 1841 – December 4, 1842	Rufus P. Spalding	Democratic	Summit
December 5, 1842 – December 3, 1843	John Chaney	Democratic	Fairfield
December 4, 1843 – December 1, 1844	John M. Gallagher	Whig	Madison
December 2, 1844 – November 30, 1845	John M. Gallagher	Whig	Clark
December 1, 1845 – December 6, 1846	Elias Franklin Drake	Whig	Greene
December 7, 1846 – December 5, 1847	William P. Cutler	Whig	Washington
December 6, 1847 – December 3, 1848	Joseph S. Hawkins	Whig	Preble
December 4, 1848 – December 2, 1849	John G. Breslin	Democratic	Seneca
December 3, 1849 – December 1, 1850	Benjamin F. Leiter	Democratic	Stark
December 2, 1850 – January 4, 1852	John F. Morse	Free Soil	Ashtabula
January 5, 1852 – January 1, 1854	James C. Johnson	Democratic	Medina
January 2, 1854 – January 6, 1856	Francis C. LeBlond	Democratic	Mercer
January 7, 1856 – January 3, 1858	Nelson H. Van Vorhes	Republican	Athens
January 4, 1858 – January 1, 1860	William Burnham Woods	Democratic	Licking
January 2, 1860 – January 5, 1862	Richard C. Parsons	Republican	Cuyahoga
January 6, 1862 – December 31, 1865	James Randolph Hubbell	Republican	Delaware
January 1, 1866 – January 5, 1868	Edwin A. Parrott	Republican	Montgomery
January 6, 1868 – January 2, 1870	John F. Follett	Democratic	Licking
January 3, 1870 – December 31, 1871	A. J. Cunningham	Republican	Hamilton
January 1, 1872 – January 4, 1874	Nelson H. Van Vorhes (2)	Republican	Athens
January 5, 1874 – January 2, 1876	George L. Converse	Democratic	Franklin
January 3, 1876 – January 6, 1878	Charles H. Grosvenor	Republican	Athens
January 7, 1878 – January 3, 1880	James E. Neal	Democratic	Butler
January 4, 1880 – January 1, 1882	Thomas A. Cowgill	Republican	Champaign
January 2, 1882 – January 6, 1884	Orlando J. Hodge	Republican	Cuyahoga
January 7, 1884 – January 3, 1886	Archelaus D. Marsh	Democratic	Mercer
January 4, 1886 – January 1, 1888	John C. Entrekin	Republican	Ross
January 2, 1888 – January 5, 1890	Elbert L. Lampson	Republican	Ashtabula
January 6, 1890 – January 3, 1892	Nial R. Hysell	Democratic	Perry
January 4, 1892 – January 2, 1894	Lewis C. Laylin	Republican	Huron
January 3, 1894 – January 5, 1896	Alexander Boxwell	Republican	Warren
January 6, 1896 – January 2, 1898	David L. Sleeper	Republican	Athens
January 3, 1898 – December 31, 1899	Harry C. Mason	Republican	Cuyahoga
January 1, 1900 – January 5, 1902	Arlington G. Reynolds	Republican	Lake
January 6, 1902 – January 3, 1904	William S. McKinnon	Republican	Ashtabula
January 4, 1904 – December 31, 1905	George T. Thomas	Republican	Huron
January 1, 1906 – January 12, 1907	Carmi A. Thompson	Republican	Lawrence
January 13, 1907 – January 3, 1909	Freeman T. Eagleson	Republican	Guernsey
January 4, 1909 – January 1, 1911	Granville W. Mooney	Republican	Ashtabula
January 2, 1911 – January 5, 1913	Samuel J. Vining	Democratic	Mercer
January 6, 1913 – January 3, 1915	Charles L. Swain	Democratic	Hamilton
January 4, 1915 – December 31, 1916	Charles D. Conover	Republican	Champaign
January 1, 1917 – January 5, 1919	E. J. Hopple	Democratic	Cuyahoga
January 6, 1919 – January 2, 1921	Carl R. Kimball	Republican	Lake
January 3, 1921 – December 31, 1922	Rupert R. Beetham	Republican	Harrison
January 1, 1923 – January 4, 1925	H. H. Griswold	Republican	Geauga
January 5, 1925 – January 14, 1926	Harry D. Silver	Republican	Preble
January 15, 1926 – January 2, 1927	Robert A. Taft	Republican	Hamilton
January 3, 1927 – January 4, 1931	O. C. Gray	Republican	Harrison
January 5, 1931 – January 1, 1933	Arthur Hamilton	Republican	Warren
January 2, 1933 – January 6, 1935	Frank Cave	Democratic	Richland
January 7, 1935 – January 3, 1937	J. Freer Bittinger	Democratic	Ashland
January 4, 1937 – January 1, 1939	Frank R. Uible	Democratic	Cuyahoga
January 2, 1939 – December 31, 1944	William M. McCulloch	Republican	Miami
January 1, 1945 – January 5, 1947	Jackson E. Betts	Republican	Hancock
January 6, 1947 – January 2, 1949	C. William O'Neill	Republican	Washington
January 3, 1949 – December 31, 1950	John F. Cantwell	Democratic	Mahoning
January 1, 1951 – January 4, 1953	Gordon Renner	Republican	Hamilton
January 5, 1953 – January 2, 1955	William B. Saxbe	Republican	Champaign
January 3, 1955 – January 4, 1959	Roger Cloud	Republican	Logan
January 5, 1959 – January 1, 1961	James A. Lantz	Democratic	Fairfield
January 2, 1961 – January 1, 1967	Roger Cloud (2)	Republican	Logan
January 2, 1967 – December 31, 1972	Charles F. Kurfess	Republican	Wood
January 1, 1973 – January 5, 1975	A. G. Lancione	Democratic	Belmont
January 6, 1975 – January 2, 1995	Vernal G. Riffe Jr.	Democratic	Scioto
January 3, 1995 – January 2, 2001	Jo Ann Davidson	Republican	Franklin
January 2, 2001 – January 3, 2005	Larry Householder	Republican	Perry
January 3, 2005 – January 5, 2009	Jon Husted	Republican	Montgomery
January 5, 2009 – January 3, 2011	Armond Budish	Democratic	Cuyahoga
January 3, 2011 – January 5, 2015	William G. Batchelder	Republican	Medina
January 5, 2015 – April 12, 2018	Cliff Rosenberger	Republican	Clinton
April 12, 2018 – June 6, 2018	Kirk Schuring - Interim Speaker	Republican	Stark
June 6, 2018 - January 7, 2019	Ryan Smith	Republican	Gallia
January 7, 2019 – July 30, 2020	Larry Householder (2)	Republican	Perry
July 30, 2020 – January 3, 2023	Robert R. Cupp	Republican	Allen
January 3, 2023 – January 6, 2025	Jason Stephens	Republican	Lawrence
January 6, 2025 –	Matt Huffman	Republican	Allen

== See also ==
- List of Ohio state legislatures
