= Charles D. Conover =

American politician

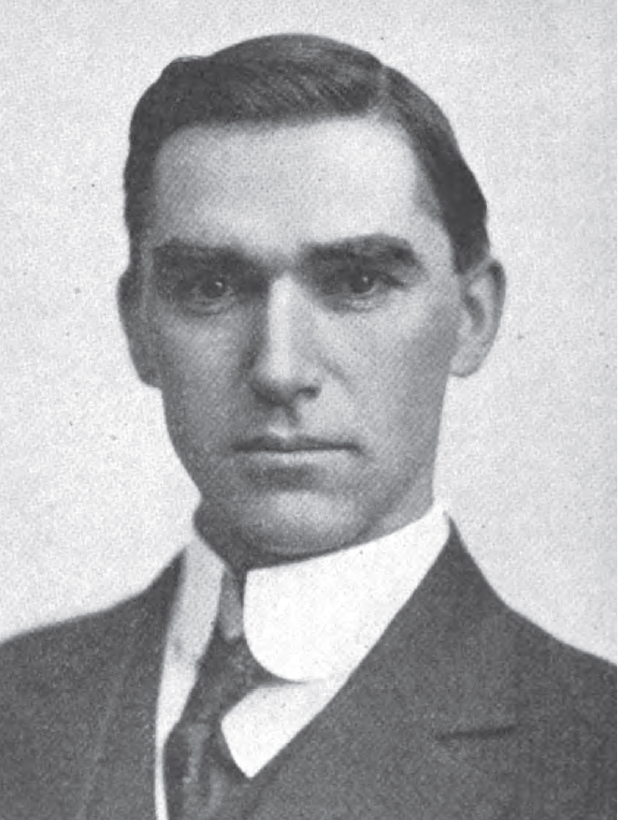
- Born: March 21, 1881; Champaign County, Ohio
- Died: July 27, 1937 (aged 56)
- Education: Ohio Northern University; Ohio Wesleyan University

Charles D. Conover (March 21, 1881 – July 27, 1937) was a Republican politician in the U.S. state of Ohio who was Speaker of the Ohio House of Representatives 1915–1916.

Mr. Conover was born in Champaign County, Ohio. He received a public school education, and attended Ohio Northern University and Ohio Wesleyan University. He was superintendent of Kings Creek schools and was married.

Conover was elected to the Ohio House of representatives in 1912 to the 80th General Assembly, and was chosen Speaker after being elected to the 81st.

== Notes ==
Ohio House of Representatives
Preceded by Charles L. Swain	Speaker of the Ohio House; 1915-1916	Succeeded by E. J. Hopple
