= Cadiz, Ohio =

- Village
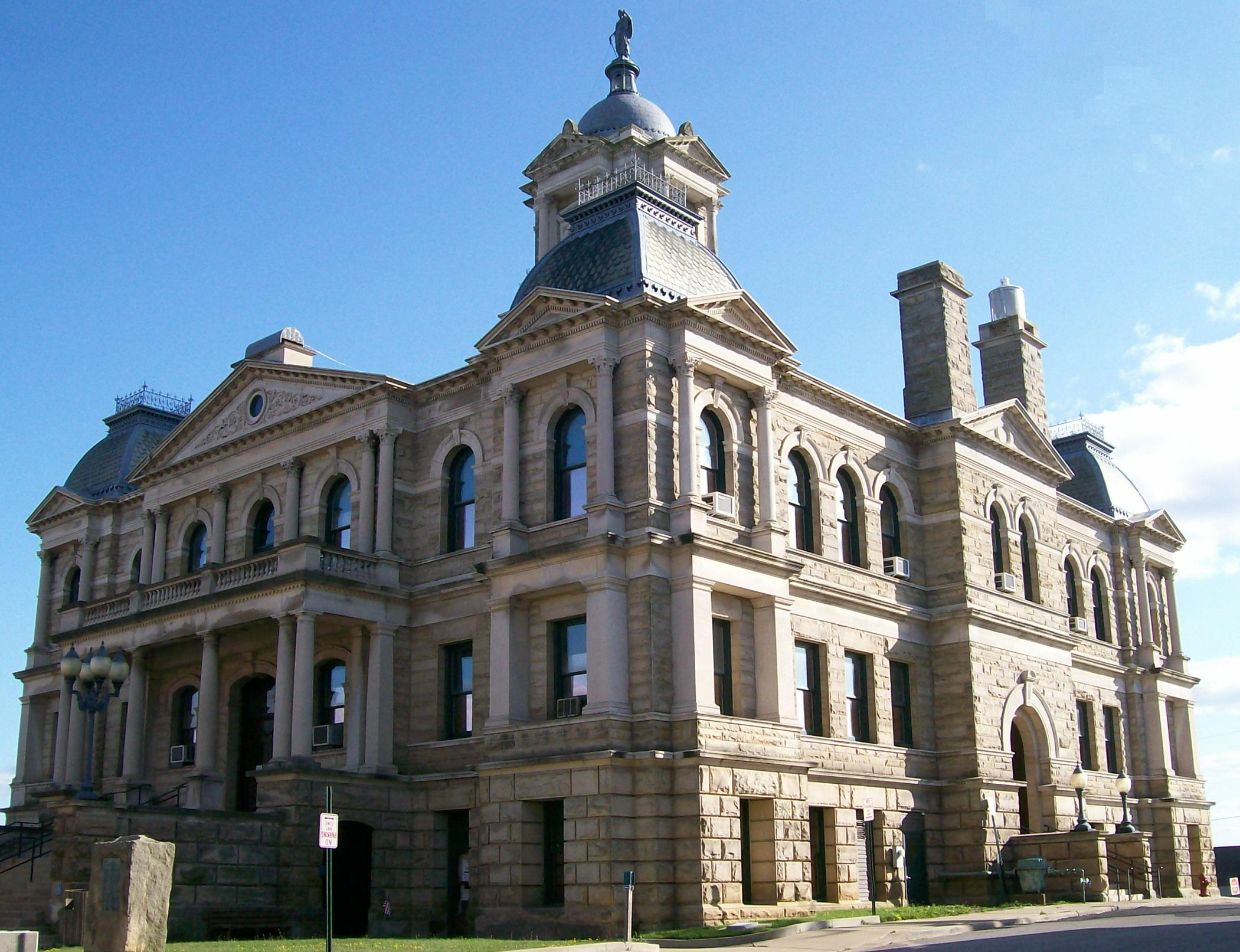
- Harrison County Courthouse, built in 1894, is listed on the National Register of Historic Places
- Interactive map of Cadiz, Ohio
- Location within Ohio Location within the United States
- Coordinates: 40°15′25″N 81°00′50″W
- Country: United States
- State: Ohio
- County: Harrison
- Township: Cadiz

Government
  - Mayor: R. Kevin Jones

Area
  - Total: 8.95 sq mi (23.17 km^{2})
  - Land: 8.78 sq mi (22.75 km^{2})
  - Water: 0.16 sq mi (0.42 km^{2})
- Elevation: 1,165 ft (355 m)

Population (2020)
  - Total: 3,051
  - Estimate (2023): 2,977
  - Density: 347/sq mi (134.1/km^{2})
- Time zone: UTC-5 (Eastern (EST))
  - Summer (DST): UTC-4 (EDT)
- ZIP code: 43907
- Area code: 740
- FIPS code: 39-10800
- GNIS feature ID: 2397520
- Website: Village website

Cadiz (/ˈkædɪs/ KAD-iss) is a village in Harrison County, Ohio, United States, and its county seat. The population was 3,051 at the 2020 census.

== History ==
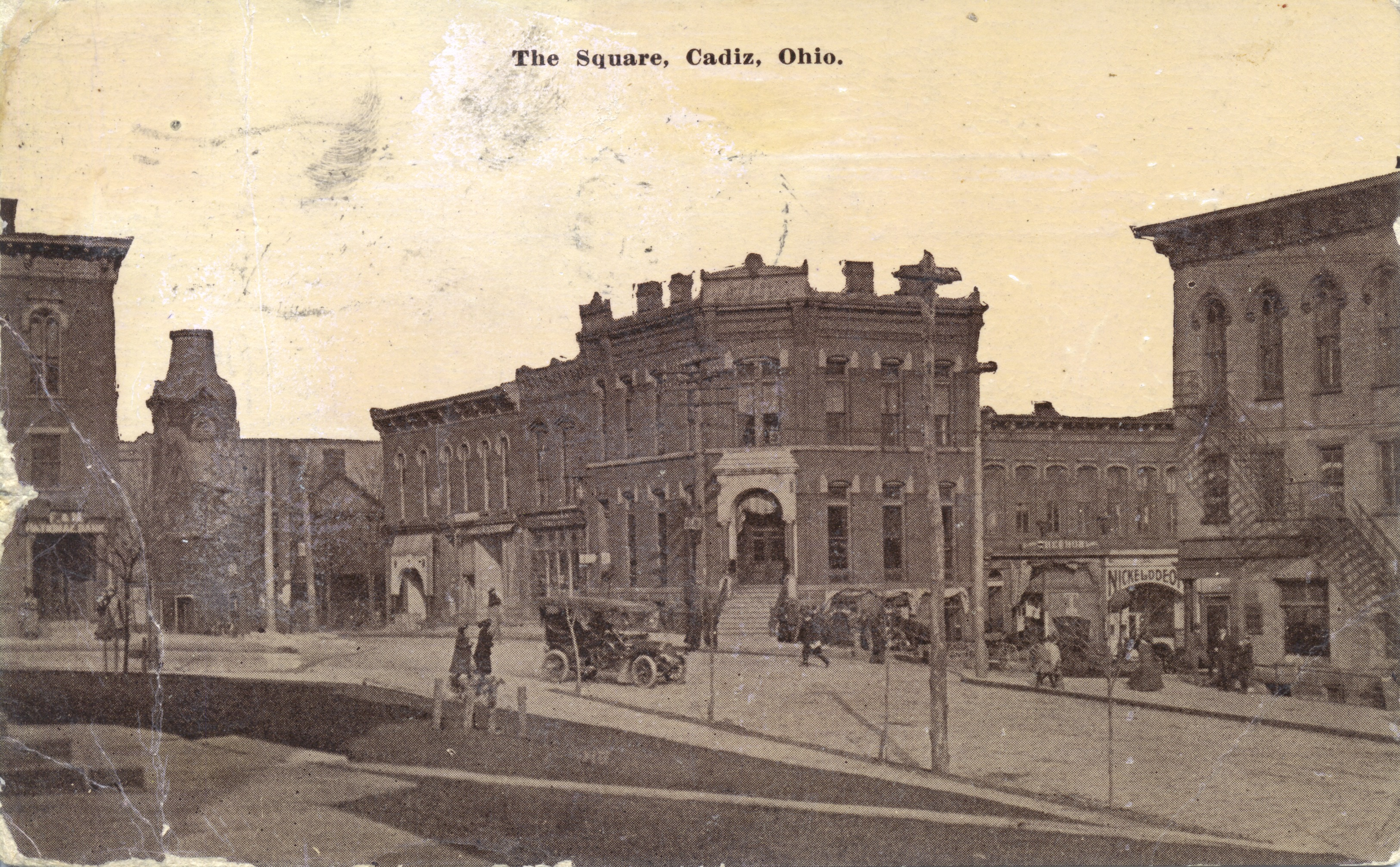
Courthouse square in Cadiz, including the Harrison National Bank

Cadiz was founded in 1803 at the junction of westward roads from Pittsburgh and Washington, Pennsylvania, and named after Cádiz, Spain. The town became the county seat of newly formed Harrison County in 1813. By 1840, Cadiz had 1,028 residents; by 1846, the town had four churches and 21 stores. The Steubenville and Indiana Railroad, a predecessor of the Pennsylvania Railroad, opened to Cadiz June 11, 1854.

In the early and mid nineteenth century, several local families operated stations and served as conductors in the Underground Railroad, helping runaway slaves escape to Canada.

By 1880 population had nearly doubled and the town had three newspapers and three banks.

Early industry was based on agriculture and processing farm products. In 1889, a brief oil boom began with the shipment of 120 barrels of oil produced in nearby Green Township. Coal mining, both underground and surface, became the prominent industry through most of the twentieth century. More recently the development of the Marcellus Shale in the surrounding area has made Cadiz a center for natural gas production. The MarkWest Complex, opened in 2012, processes more than 180 million cubic feet of natural gas per day for shipment via pipeline to Mont Belvieu, Texas.

== Geography ==
According to the United States Census Bureau, the village has a total area of 8.94 square miles (23.15 km^{2}), of which 8.78 square miles (22.74 km^{2}) is land and 0.16 square miles (0.41 km^{2}) is water.

=== Climate ===
Climate data for Cadiz, Ohio (1991–2020 normals, extremes 1893–2009)
Month	Jan	Feb	Mar	Apr	May	Jun	Jul	Aug	Sep	Oct	Nov	Dec	Year
Record high °F (°C)	73 (23)	76 (24)	86 (30)	92 (33)	96 (36)	101 (38)	104 (40)	106 (41)	100 (38)	91 (33)	82 (28)	75 (24)	106 (41)
Mean daily maximum °F (°C)	34.2 (1.2)	37.7 (3.2)	47.4 (8.6)	60.5 (15.8)	69.9 (21.1)	78.0 (25.6)	81.5 (27.5)	80.9 (27.2)	74.7 (23.7)	62.5 (16.9)	50.1 (10.1)	38.7 (3.7)	59.7 (15.4)
Daily mean °F (°C)	27.0 (−2.8)	29.7 (−1.3)	38.5 (3.6)	50.2 (10.1)	60.4 (15.8)	68.8 (20.4)	72.4 (22.4)	71.5 (21.9)	64.8 (18.2)	53.0 (11.7)	41.7 (5.4)	32.0 (0.0)	50.8 (10.4)
Mean daily minimum °F (°C)	19.8 (−6.8)	21.8 (−5.7)	29.6 (−1.3)	40.0 (4.4)	50.8 (10.4)	59.6 (15.3)	63.4 (17.4)	62.1 (16.7)	54.9 (12.7)	43.5 (6.4)	33.2 (0.7)	25.4 (−3.7)	42.0 (5.6)
Record low °F (°C)	−24 (−31)	−17 (−27)	−6 (−21)	5 (−15)	23 (−5)	33 (1)	42 (6)	40 (4)	28 (−2)	15 (−9)	−2 (−19)	−17 (−27)	−24 (−31)
Average precipitation inches (mm)	3.55 (90)	2.64 (67)	3.33 (85)	3.67 (93)	4.07 (103)	4.59 (117)	3.96 (101)	3.52 (89)	3.95 (100)	3.23 (82)	3.07 (78)	3.00 (76)	42.58 (1,082)
Average snowfall inches (cm)	7.9 (20)	5.8 (15)	5.1 (13)	0.4 (1.0)	0.0 (0.0)	0.0 (0.0)	0.0 (0.0)	0.0 (0.0)	0.0 (0.0)	0.1 (0.25)	1.3 (3.3)	5.2 (13)	25.8 (66)
Average precipitation days (≥ 0.01 in)	16.4	12.5	12.9	14.5	14.3	12.5	12.3	9.8	9.9	9.9	13.3	14.8	153.1
Average snowy days (≥ 0.1 in)	7.5	4.6	3.1	0.4	0.0	0.0	0.0	0.0	0.0	0.1	1.6	4.6	21.9
Source: NOAA

== Demographics ==
Historical population
Census	Pop.	Note	%±
1820	537		—
1830	818		52.3%
1840	1,028		25.7%
1850	1,144		11.3%
1860	1,168		2.1%
1870	1,435		22.9%
1880	1,817		26.6%
1890	1,716		−5.6%
1900	1,755		2.3%
1910	1,971		12.3%
1920	2,084		5.7%
1930	2,597		24.6%
1940	2,808		8.1%
1950	3,020		7.5%
1960	3,259		7.9%
1970	3,060		−6.1%
1980	4,058		32.6%
1990	3,439		−15.3%
2000	3,308		−3.8%
2010	3,353		1.4%
2020	3,051		−9.0%
2023 (est.)	2,977	▼	−2.4%
U.S. Decennial Census

=== 2020 census ===
As of the 2020 census, Cadiz had a population of 3,051. The median age was 44.8 years. 20.7% of residents were under the age of 18 and 23.2% of residents were 65 years of age or older. For every 100 females there were 90.0 males, and for every 100 females age 18 and over there were 84.7 males age 18 and over.

0.0% of residents lived in urban areas, while 100.0% lived in rural areas.

There were 1,341 households in Cadiz, of which 26.3% had children under the age of 18 living in them. Of all households, 40.7% were married-couple households, 18.6% were households with a male householder and no spouse or partner present, and 33.5% were households with a female householder and no spouse or partner present. About 35.2% of all households were made up of individuals and 17.9% had someone living alone who was 65 years of age or older.

There were 1,568 housing units, of which 14.5% were vacant. The homeowner vacancy rate was 2.5% and the rental vacancy rate was 18.5%.

Racial composition as of the 2020 census
Race	Number	Percent
White	2,620	85.9%
Black or African American	208	6.8%
American Indian and Alaska Native	1	0.0%
Asian	15	0.5%
Native Hawaiian and Other Pacific Islander	0	0.0%
Some other race	17	0.6%
Two or more races	190	6.2%
Hispanic or Latino (of any race)	34	1.1%

=== 2010 census ===
As of the US Census of 2010, there were 3,353 people, 1,415 households, and 920 families living in the village. The population density was 376.7 inhabitants per square mile (145.4/km^{2}). There were 1,590 housing units at an average density of 178.6 per square mile (68.8 km^{2}). The racial makeup of the village was 87.4% White, 8.4% African American, 0.3% Asian, 0.3% from other races, and 3.5% from two or more races. Hispanic or Latino of any race were 0.8% of the population.

Of the 1,415 households, 29.8% had children under the age of 18 living with them, 44.8% were married couples living together, 14.8% had a female householder with no husband present, and 35.0% were non-families. 30.7% of households were one person and 12.9% were one person aged 65 or older. The average household size was 2.32 and the average family size was 2.86. 39.1% of households were renters and 60.9% were home owners. Families made up 73.3% of all home owners and 52.1% of all renters.

The age distribution was 24.8% under the age of 20, 22.9% from 20 to 40, 27.2% from 40 to 60, 19.3% from 60 to 80, and 5.9% who were 80 years of age or older. The median age was 42.3 years. For every 100 females there were 89.3 males. For every 100 females age 18 and over, there were 84.8 males.

According to 2006-2010 American Community Survey 5-Year Estimates by the US Census Bureau, The median household income was $31,092, and the median family income was $43,182. Males had a median income of $35,934 versus $26,726 for females. The per capita income for the village was $18,002. About 14.0% of families and 19.0% of the population were below the poverty line, including 26.7% of those under age 18 and 15.0% of those age 65 or over.

=== 2000 census ===
At the 2000 census there were 3,308 people, 1,391 households, and 916 families living in the village. The population density was 374.5 inhabitants per square mile (144.6/km^{2}). There were 1,524 housing units at an average density of 172.5 per square mile (66.6/km^{2}). The racial makeup of the village was 87.70% White, 8.98% African American, 0.39% Asian, 0.03% Pacific Islander, 0.15% from other races, and 2.75% from two or more races. Hispanic or Latino of any race were 0.27%.

Of the 1,391 households 28.3% had children under the age of 18 living with them, 49.2% were married couples living together, 13.3% had a female householder with no husband present, and 34.1% were non-families. 30.9% of households were one person and 16.0% were one person aged 65 or older. The average household size was 2.30 and the average family size was 2.85.

The age distribution was 22.3% under the age of 18, 7.5% from 18 to 24, 23.6% from 25 to 44, 25.6% from 45 to 64, and 20.9% 65 or older. The median age was 43 years. For every 100 females there were 82.3 males. For every 100 females age 18 and over, there were 77.4 males.

The median household income was $29,518 and the median family income was $42,049. Males had a median income of $33,233 versus $17,192 for females. The per capita income for the village was $17,405. About 12.5% of families and 15.7% of the population were below the poverty line, including 24.2% of those under age 18 and 8.9% of those age 65 or over.

== Education ==
The village is served by Harrison Hills City School District, which operates an elementary school and Harrison Central High School in a new (2019) building .

Cadiz has a public library, the main branch of the Puskarich Public Library.

In the fall 2015, a levy was passed to build a new preK-12 school building. The 4.98 million dollar levy for the creation of a 190,000-square-foot school complex will be able to house 1,550 students. Ground broke on the new building in August 2017, and opened in the fall of 2019.

== Infrastructure ==
=== Transportation ===
The Harrison County Airport is located two nautical miles (2.3 mi; 3.7 km) south of Cadiz's central business district.

== Notable people ==
- Rupert R. Beetham, speaker of Ohio House of Representatives
- John Bingham, Republican congressman
- Henderson H. Carson, U.S. representative from Ohio
- Thomas Valentine Cooper, Pennsylvania state senator and representative
- Robert Crozier, senator from Kansas
- Charles S. Dewey, U.S. representative from Illinois
- Ernest G. Eagleson, two-term mayor of Boise, Idaho
- Clark Gable, Oscar winning actor
- O. C. Gray, state legislator who served as Speaker of the Ohio House of Representatives
- David Hollingsworth, U.S. representative from Ohio
- William Henry Holmes, scientist and artist
- Laura E. Howey, educator, librarian, and temperance leader
- Daniel Kilgore, U.S. representative from Ohio
- Humphrey H. Leavitt, U.S. representative from Ohio and U.S. district court judge
- Francis J. Love, U.S. representative from West Virginia
- Tyria Moore, companion of female serial killer Aileen Wuornos
- John F. Oglevee, member of the Ohio House of Representatives and Ohio state auditor
- Orlando Henderson Petty, Medal of Honor recipient
- Elizabeth Russel, missionary educator
- William R. Sapp, U.S. representative from Ohio
- Matthew Simpson, bishop of the Methodist Episcopal Church
- William E. Slemmons, clergyman and academic
- David P. Thompson, businessman and politician
- Thomas Tipton, U.S. senator
- Ben Wilson, football coach
- Oriska Worden, singer and vaudeville performer
