= Harry C. Mason =

American politician

Speaker of the Ohio House of Representatives
- In office January 3, 1898 – December 31, 1899
- Preceded by: David L. Sleeper
- Succeeded by: Arlington G. Reynolds

Personal details
- Born: May 22, 1867 Cleveland, Ohio
- Died: August 1, 1901 (aged 34) Prescott, Arizona Territory
- Party: Republican

Harry C. Mason was a politician from Cleveland, Ohio, United States who served as Speaker of the Ohio House of Representatives.

Harry C. Mason was born in Cleveland, Ohio on May 22, 1867. He lived in Ravenna, Sylvania, and Madison before returning to Cleveland in 1889. He studied law at night while working as a stenographer, and was admitted to the bar in 1891. He formed a partnership with F. L. Taft under the name Mason & Taft.

In 1895, Mason was elected to the 72nd General Assembly, 1896 and 1897, of the Ohio House of Representatives as one of the representatives from Cuyahoga County, Ohio. He was re-elected in 1897, and during the 73rd General Assembly, 1898 and 1899, was chosen Speaker of the House by a coalition of Democrats and Republicans opposed to bossism.

Mason was a Republican, and a member of the Benevolent and Protective Order of Elks, Knights of Pythias, and Sons of Veterans.

He died of tuberculosis in 1901.
