= Alexander Boxwell =

American politician

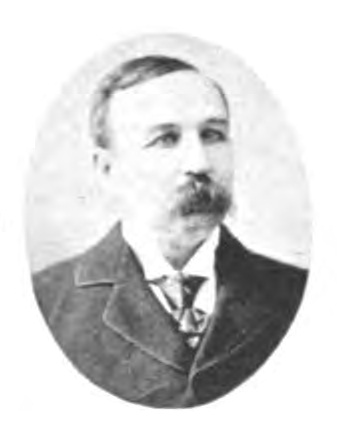

Member of the Ohio House of Representatives from the Warren County district
- In office January 6, 1890 – December 31, 1899
- Preceded by: William T. Whitacre
- Succeeded by: William T. Whitacre

Personal details
- Born: October 12, 1852 near Winchester, Frederick County, Virginia
- Died: January 23, 1923 (aged 70) Dayton, Ohio
- Party: Republican
- Spouse: Margaret Virginia Devericks
- Children: Leslie, Carey
- Education: Ohio Wesleyan University

Alexander Boxwell (1852-1923) was a Republican politician from Ohio in the united States. He was Speaker of the Ohio House of Representatives 1894 to 1896.

== Biography ==
Alexander Boxwell was born near Winchester in Frederick County, Virginia in 1852, and came in 1857 with his parents to Springboro, Warren County, Ohio. He attended the local schools and entered Ohio Wesleyan University at Delaware, Ohio at age twenty. He taught school for sixteen years and studied law.

Boxwell was admitted to the bar in 1881, and was justice of the peace for twelve years. He was first elected to the Ohio House of Representatives in 1889 as a Republican, and served five terms from 1890 to 1899. He was selected by his peers as Speaker for the 1894 to 1896 term.

Boxwell died at the Miami Valley Hospital in Dayton in 1923 of heart disease. He had been ill for around a month prior to his death. He was 70. He was remembered for the Boxwell law, a law regulating rural school students to be examined prior to entering city high schools.

Ohio House of Representatives
Preceded by Lewis C. Laylin	Speaker of the Ohio House; 1894-1896	Succeeded by David L. Sleeper
