= Hal Howard Griswold =

American politician

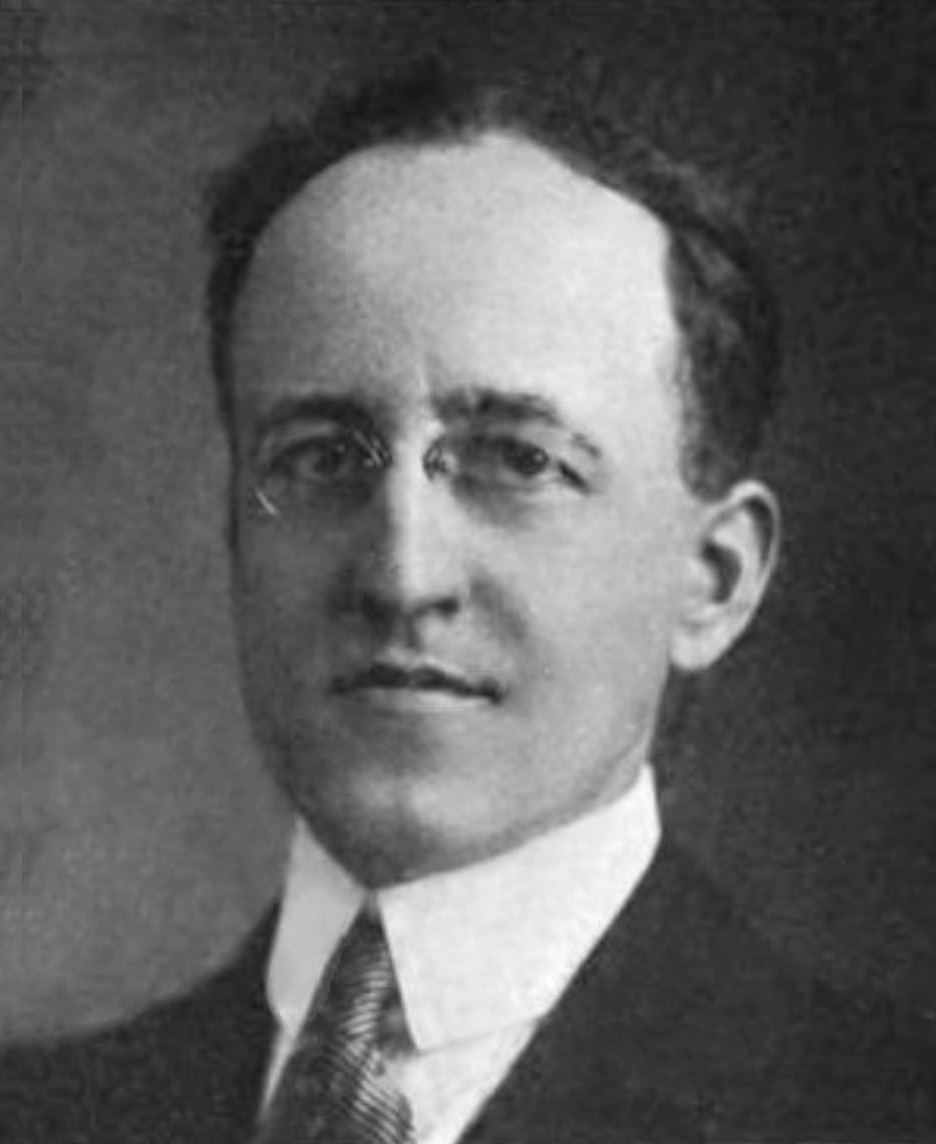

Speaker of the Ohio House of Representatives
- In office January 1, 1923 – January 4, 1925
- Preceded by: Rupert R. Beetham
- Succeeded by: Harry D. Silver

Personal details
- Born: May 25, 1886 Chardon, Ohio, US
- Died: February 6, 1953 (aged 66) Chardon, Ohio, US
- Resting place: Chardon Cemetery
- Party: Republican
- Spouse: Gertrude L. Carter
- Education: Adelbert College

Hal Howard Griswold was a politician from the U.S. state of Ohio. He was the Speaker of the Ohio House of Representatives in 1923 and 1924.

== Background ==
Born in Chardon, Ohio on May 25, 1886, to his parents were Eli J. and Ellen (Mynderse) Griswold. Griswold was educated at the common school and high school of Chardon, and received an A.B from Adelbert College of Western Reserve University.

Griswold studied law in an office and by correspondence, while he taught science and mathematics at Chardon schools, 1909-'10, was principal of Chardon High School, 1910-'11, and Superintendent of Schools at Chardon, 1911-'16. He was a member of the Board of School Examiners, 1911-'16, was admitted to the bar, January 4, 1916, and began practice in Chardon July 1, 1916.

First elected to the Ohio House of Representatives in 1918, Griswold was re-elected in 1920 and 1922. He ran as a Republican. During the last session, 1923 and 1924, he was selected as Speaker of the House.

== Personal life ==
Hal Howard Griswold was married to Gertrude L. Carter of Oberlin, Ohio on July 23, 1914. They had at least one daughter. He was a member of the Independent Order of Odd Fellows, Knights of Pythias, and Phi Beta Kappa. During World War I he was Chairman of the United War Work Campaign, and spoke for the Red Cross and Liberty Loan campaigns. Griswold died in 1953, and is buried in Chardon.

== Bibliography ==
- Halley, W E; Maynard, John P. (1920). Manual of Legislative Practice in the General Assembly 1919-1920. Columbus: State Bindery.
- Neff, William B, ed. (1921). Bench and Bar of Northern Ohio History and Biography. Cleveland: The Historical Publishing Company. p. 426.
- "Alphabetical list of Members of the General Assembly of Ohio for 127 years - 1803 - 1930". State Library of Ohio. Archived from the original on 2012-04-15.

Ohio House of Representatives
Preceded by William P. Ellis	Representative from Geauga County; 1919-1924	Succeeded by Frank S. Bartlett
