= Harrison County Airport (Ohio) =

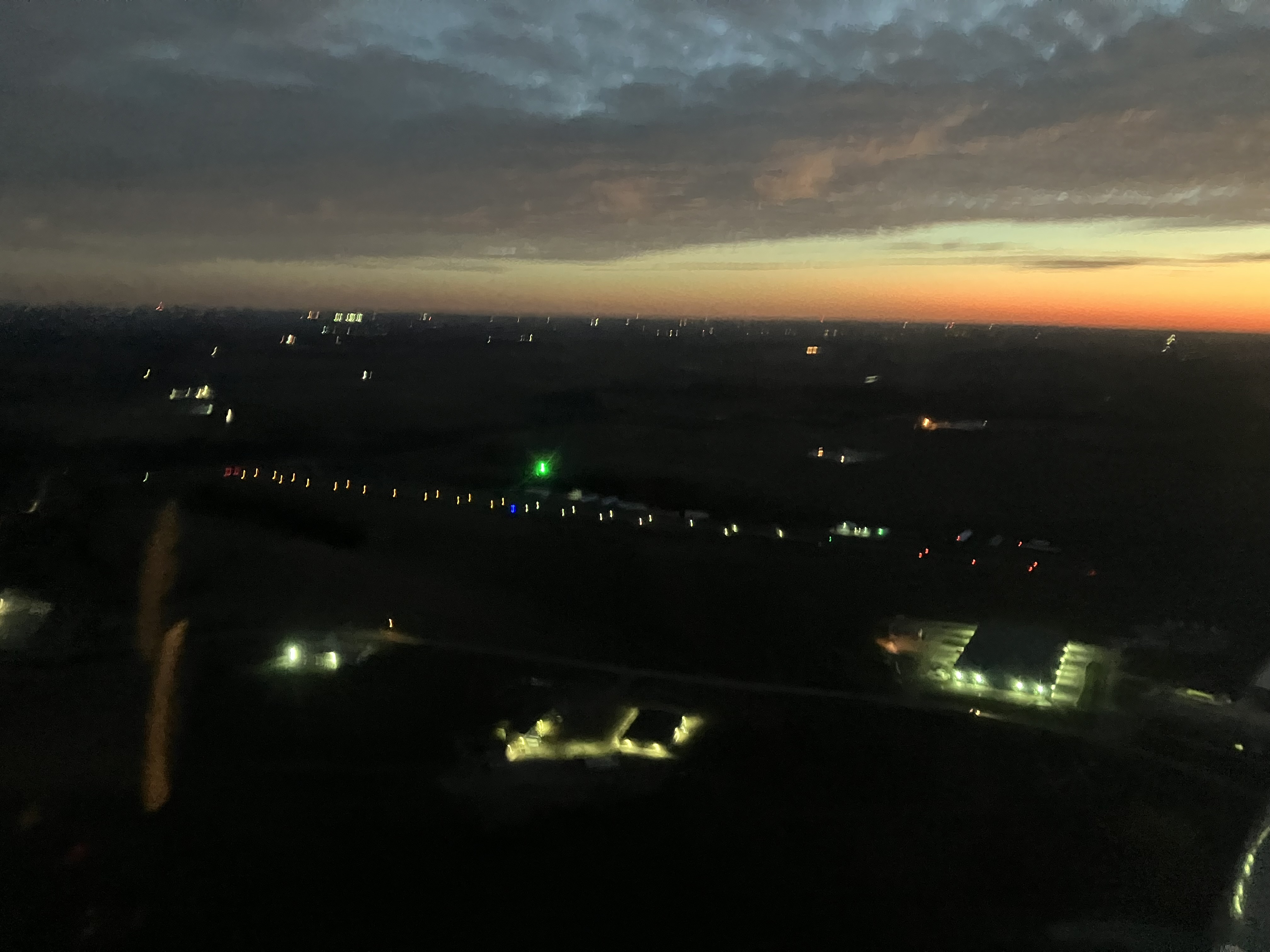
- IATA: none; ICAO: none; FAA LID: 8G6

Summary
- Airport type: Public
- Owner: Harrison County Airport Authority
- Operator: Desapi Air Service
- Serves: Cadiz, Ohio
- Time zone: UTC−05:00 (-5)
  - Summer (DST): UTC−04:00 (-4)
- Elevation AMSL: 1,174 ft (358 m)
- Coordinates: 40°14′18″N 081°00′46″W

Maps
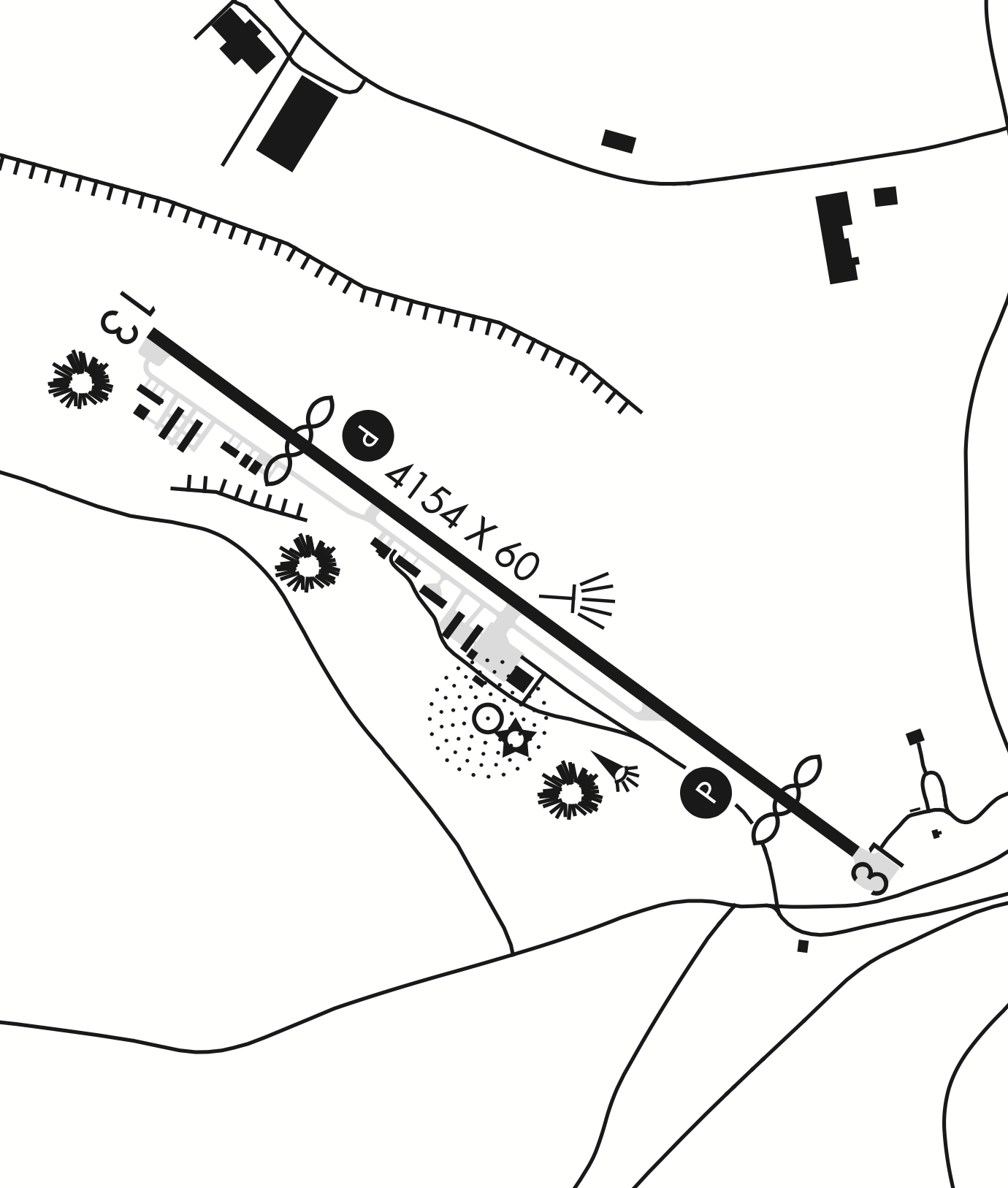

- Location of airport in Ohio 8G6 (the United States)

Runways
| Direction | Length | | Surface |
| Direction | ft | m | Surface |
|---|---|---|---|
| 13/31 | 4,154 | 1,266 | Asphalt |

Statistics (2022)
- Aircraft operations: 4,992
- Based aircraft: 22
- Source: Federal Aviation Administration

Harrison County Airport (FAA LID: 8G6) is a public use airport located two nautical miles (4 km) south of the central business district of Cadiz, a village in Harrison County, Ohio, United States. It is owned by the Harrison County Airport Authority. This airport was included in the National Plan of Integrated Airport Systems for 2011–2015, which categorized it as a general aviation facility.

== History ==
The airport was originally opened in November 1960. The Hanna Coal Company offered the 74-acre (30 ha) airport to the county in April 1966. However, disputes over mining rights delayed the transfer beyond a dedication ceremony in July. The airport received a state grant in March 1967 and the Hannah Coal Company was awarded a contract to repave and widen the runway in early May. The airport was again dedicated, just over two years after the first attempt, on 18 August 1968.

In 2015, the airport received a $57,000 grant from the Federal Aviation Administration for several improvements, including fixing the airport's rotating beacon, rehabilitating runway pavement markings, and conducting a wildlife hazard assessment.

In 2021, the airport received a $310,846 grant as part of the Federal Aviation Administration's Airport improvement Program during the COVID-19 pandemic. The airport used the money to relocate the airport's taxiway to make enough room for safety margins for the runway. Subsequently, the fuel farm, sewer pump station, and access road also needed to be moved. The airport received an additional $1.96 million in 2022 to help with the project.

== Facilities and aircraft ==
Harrison County Airport covers an area of 8 acres (3 ha) at an elevation of 1,174 feet (358 m) above mean sea level. It has one runway designated 13/31 with an asphalt surface measuring 4,154 by 75 feet (1,266 x 23 m).

For the 12-month period ending June 17, 2022, the airport had 4,992 aircraft operations, an average of 96 per week. It included 99% general aviation and 1% military. For the same time period, there were 22 aircraft based at the airport, all single-engine airplanes. This is down from 11,900 aircraft movements and 25 based aircraft in 2010.

The airport has a fixed-base operator that sells fuel and offers limited services.

== Accidents and incidents ==
- On August 17, 2016, a Sport Trainer aircraft was substantially damaged while landing at the Harrison County Airport. The pilot of the tailwheel equipped airplane reported that, during landing, the airplane touched down and veered to the left. The pilot further reported that he applied right rudder, but accidentally caught the right heel brake and the airplane veered off the runway to the right and subsequently nosed over. The probable cause of the accident was found to be the pilot's failure to maintain directional control during landing and the unintentional right brake application, which resulted in a runway excursion and a nose over.

== See also ==
- List of airports in Ohio
