= Carl R. Kimball =

American politician (1876–1965)

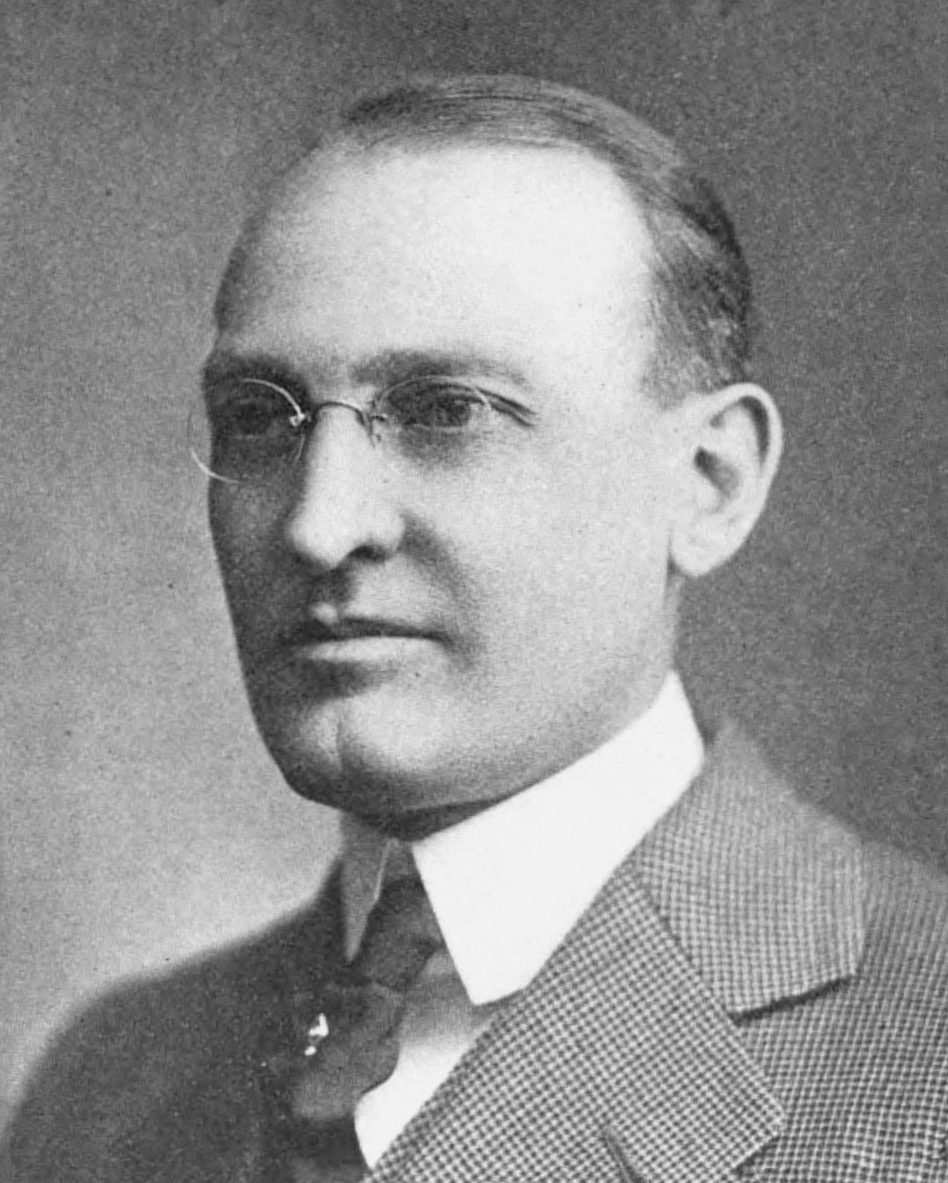
- Born: July 3, 1876; Madison, Ohio, U.S.
- Died: June 3, 1965 (aged 88); Madison, Ohio, U.S.
- Education: Oberlin College
- Occupation: Republican politician

Carl Russell Kimball (July 3, 1876 – June 3, 1965) was a Republican politician in the U.S. state of Ohio who was Speaker of the Ohio House of Representatives 1919–1920.

Mr. Kimball was born in Madison, Ohio. He was educated at Madison High School and Oberlin College.

Kimball was in the hardware business in Madison, where he was a member of the Masonic, Maccabee, and Grange lodges. He was married. He was elected to represent Lake County in the Ohio House of Representatives, where he was chosen Speaker for the 1919–1920 General Assembly.

Kimball's grandfather, Abel (1844–45, 1847), and brother, Homer N. (1902–1905) each represented Lake County in the Ohio House of Representatives.

Kimball was married July 30, 1903, to Ethel Felice Sutton, originally of Washington, D.C., and later a student at the Oberlin Conservatory of Music. They had two children.

Kimball died June 3, 1965.

Ohio House of Representatives
Preceded by E. J. Hopple	Speaker of the Ohio House; 1919–1920	Succeeded by Rupert R. Beetham
