= Harrison National Bank =

- U.S. National Register of Historic Places
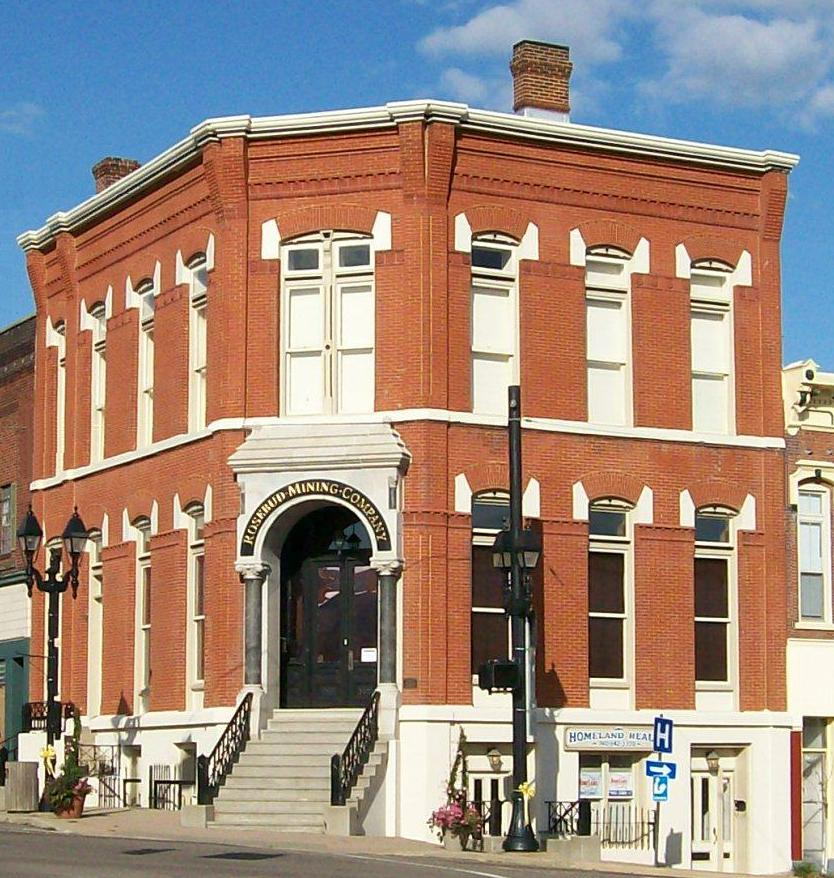
- The Harrison County Bank in Cadiz, Ohio

- Location within Ohio Location within the United States
- Location: 101 E. Market St., Cadiz, Ohio
- Coordinates: 40°16′22″N 80°59′48″W
- Area: less than one acre
- Built: 1886
- Architect: Hamilton, Charles P.
- Architectural style: Queen Anne
- NRHP reference No.: 93001438
- Added to NRHP: December 23, 1993

The Harrison National Bank building is a two-story brick building located at 101 East Main Street in Cadiz, Ohio. The building was placed on the National Register on December 23, 1993.

== History ==
The State Bank of Ohio was founded in 1841 and quickly spread to various parts of Ohio, including Cadiz. The bank operated until 1847, when the Harrison County branch changed its charter and was renamed the Harrison National Bank. The building was built almost 40 years later by architect Charles Hamilton.

== Exterior ==
The structure is built of red brick with a smooth stone foundation. The first floor, or basement, serves as storefront and can be accessed only by Main Street. The main entrance is located at the corner and is reached by a flight of stairs. The recessed door is framed by an arch with supportive Ionic columns. Lining the curve of an arch was a sign reading "Harrison National Bank", but now reads "Rosebud Mining Company", the current occupants.

The façade of the building contains two floors of large arched windows with decorative capstones. The flat roof is hidden behind a machicolated solid balustrade. Two large brick chimneys can be seen rising from the roof. A side entrance is located on the left side of the building and was once used as a staff entrance.
