= Orlando Henderson Petty =

United States Navy Medal of Honor recipient (1874–1932)

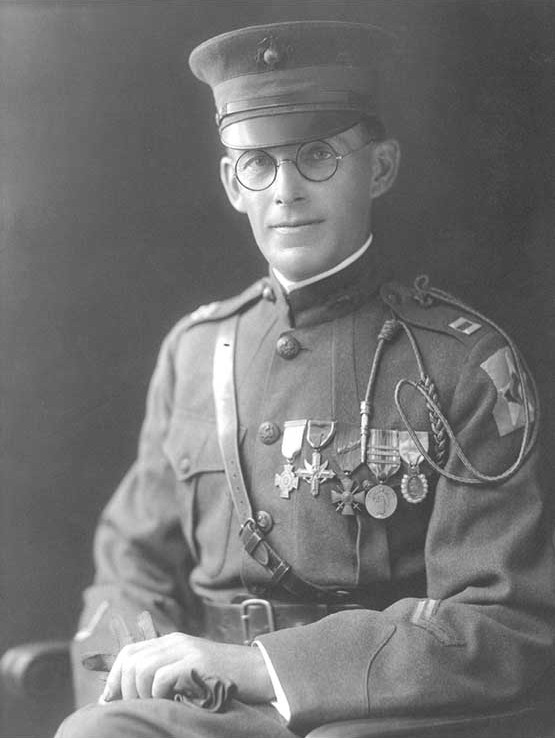
- Born: February 20, 1874; Cadiz, Ohio, US
- Died: June 2, 1932 (aged 58); Philadelphia, Pennsylvania, US
- Burial place: Saint Timothy's Episcopal Church Cemetery, Philadelphia, Pennsylvania
- Military career
- Allegiance: United States
- Branch: United States Naval Reserve
- Service years: 1916–1918
- Rank: Lieutenant
- Units: Navy Medical Corps; 5th Marine Regiment
- Conflicts: World War I • Battle of Belleau Wood
- Awards: Medal of Honor; Distinguished Service Cross; Silver Star; Croix de Guerre with palm (France); Croce di Guerra (Italy)

Orlando Henderson Petty (February 20, 1874 – June 2, 1932) was an American physician and naval officer. As a surgeon in the United States Naval Reserve, he received the Medal of Honor for his actions during World War I.

== Early life and family ==
Petty was born in Cadiz, Ohio, on February 20, 1874 to Asbury Festus Petty and Sallie M Kyle. Orlando had a twin brother Orville A Petty and a younger sister Netta A Petty. He graduated from Jefferson Medical College in Philadelphia in 1904 and two years later joined the school's teaching staff. In 1908, he married Marcia P. Mellersh of Philadelphia; the couple had two children, Clara M. and Orville A. Petty.

== Military service ==
Petty joined the U.S. Naval Reserve Force as a lieutenant, junior grade, in December 1916 and served in the Medical Corps. After the United States' entry into World War I, he was sent to France where he worked as an assistant surgeon. In March 1918, he was promoted to lieutenant.

By June 11, 1918, Petty was attached to the 5th Marine Regiment as the unit took part in the Battle of Belleau Wood. On that day, his dressing station in Lucy-le-Bocage came under heavy fire from German artillery, some of which were firing poison gas shells. He continued to evacuate and treat the wounded, even after he was knocked to the ground and his gas mask rendered useless by an exploding shell. When the dressing station was destroyed, he personally carried wounded Captain Lloyd W. Williams to safety. Captain Williams was the Marine famously quoted as saying "Retreat? Hell, we just got here!" For these actions, Petty was awarded the Medal of Honor.

Other decorations which Petty received during the war include the Distinguished Service Cross, the Croix de Guerre with palm from France, and the Croce di Guerra from Italy.

== Later years and death ==
After his military service, Petty returned to Philadelphia and resumed teaching medicine. From 1923 until shortly before his death, he was a professor of metabolic diseases at the University of Pennsylvania. He was also the personal physician of Philadelphia mayor Harry A. Mackey. In 1931, Mackey appointed him as the head of the city's public health department. Petty was a member of the Sons of the Revolution.

On June 2, 1932, Petty's family found him dead in the bedroom of his Philadelphia home. He had been shot through the heart, apparently with his military service pistol, which was found nearby. His family noted that he had been in poor health for some time; his death was ruled a suicide. He is buried at Saint Timothy's Episcopal Church Cemetery in Philadelphia's Roxborough neighborhood.

== Medal of Honor citation ==
Petty's official Medal of Honor citation reads:

For extraordinary heroism while serving with the 5th Regiment, U.S. Marines, in France during the attack in the Bois de Belleau, 11 June 1918. While under heavy fire of high explosive and gas shells in the town of Lucy, where his dressing station was located, Lt. Petty attended to and evacuated the wounded under most trying conditions. Having been knocked to the ground by an exploding gas shell which tore his mask, Lt. Petty discarded the mask and courageously continued his work. His dressing station being hit and demolished, he personally helped carry Capt. Williams, wounded, through the shellfire to a place of safety.

== See also ==
- List of Medal of Honor recipients for World War I
