= Frank R. Uible =

American politician (1895–1974)

Frank R. Uible (January 10, 1895 – January 20, 1974) was a Democratic politician in the U.S. state of Ohio who was in the Ohio House of Representatives, and served as Speaker of the House 1937–1939.

== Biography ==
Frank R. Uible was born to William D. and Ida (Stouder) Uible of Leesburg, Ohio. He attended public schools and entered the Ohio Wesleyan University, graduating in 1919. During the First World War he was a first lieutenant in the Third Officers Training Camp.

Uible graduated from the Case Western Reserve University School of Law in 1927, and began practice in Cleveland, Ohio. He opened his own office in downtown Cleveland in 1930. In 1932, he was elected to the Ohio House of Representatives, serving on the Judiciary Committee. He was re-elected in 1934, and was Democratic floor leader of the House, and re-elected again in 1936, serving as Speaker of the House for two years.

Uible was a member of the Cleveland and Ohio State Bar associations, and was Phi Delta Phi. He married Laura Michalske of Cleveland on July 30, 1932.

Ohio House of Representatives
Preceded by J. Freer Bittinger	Speaker of the House; 1937-1939	Succeeded by William M. McCulloch
