= Charles L. Swain =

American lawyer

Charles L Swain
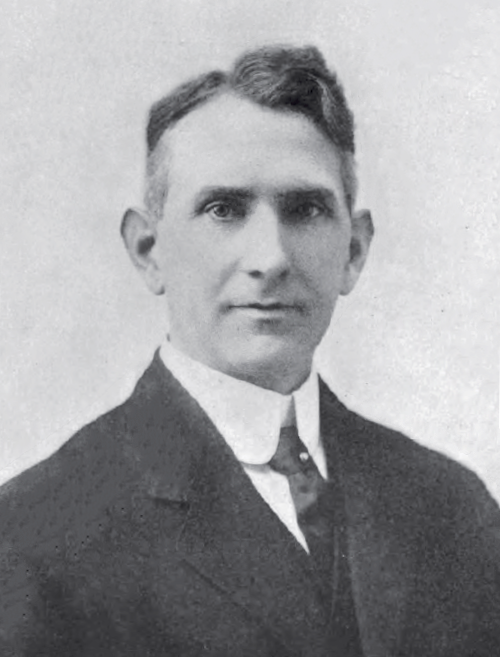
- Born: April 19, 1866; Fincastle, Ohio
- Died: February 28, 1933 (aged 66); Cincinnati

Signature
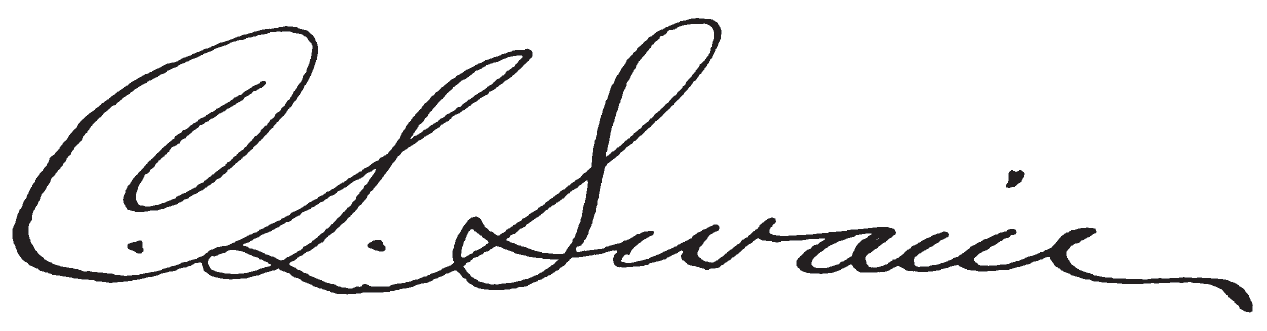

Charles L. Swain (April 19, 1866 – February 28, 1933) was a Democratic politician from Cincinnati, Ohio, United States who was Speaker of the Ohio House of Representatives, and an unsuccessful candidate for Ohio's 2nd congressional district.

== Biography ==
Charles Luther Swain was born April 19, 1866, at Fincastle, Brown County, Ohio. His father, Samuel Luther Swain was born in Pennsylvania and was a miller. Charles followed that trade for some time, and then removed with his family to West Union, Adams County, Ohio, at age 13, where he lived until moving to Cincinnati, Ohio.

Swain was educated at the public schools and at Ohio Northern University at Ada, Ohio. He taught school for eight years, and was School Examiner for Adams County for four years. He graduated from Cincinnati Law School and was admitted to the bar in 1893, locating in Cincinnati to practice. Swain was elected to represent Hamilton County, Ohio, in the Ohio House of Representatives for the 73rd and 74th General Assemblies, 1898–1901. In 1898, Swain was nominated by the Democrats for Ohio's 2nd congressional district, and lost the general election to Republican Jacob H. Bromwell.

Swain was again elected to the 80th General Assembly, 1913–1914, and was chosen by his party caucus as Speaker.

Charles Swain was married August 23, 1894, to Anna M. Burket. He was married again 1907 to Ada McGowan of Hartwell, Ohio. He was married again to Hester Louise Daniels of Macon Ohio on November 14, 1917. He was a Presbyterian and a member of the Order of Knights of Pythias.

He died at Cincinnati in 1933 of brain fever after a long illness.

Ohio House of Representatives
Preceded by Samuel J. Vining	Speaker; 1913-1914	Succeeded by Charles D. Conover
