= Samuel J. Vining =

American politician (1854–1914)

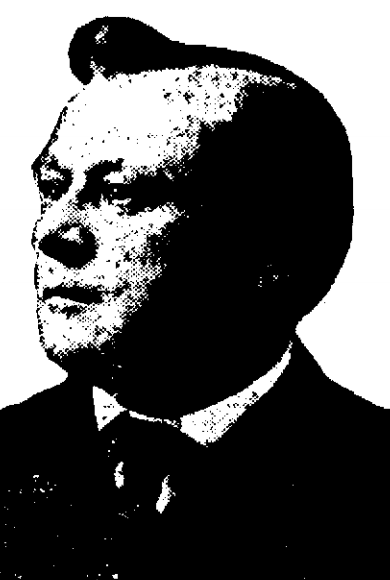

Speaker of the Ohio House of Representatives
- In office January 2, 1911 – January 5, 1913
- Preceded by: Granville W. Mooney
- Succeeded by: Charles L. Swain

Personal details
- Born: March 22, 1864 South Salem, Indiana, US
- Died: October 15, 1914 (aged 50) Celina, Ohio, US
- Resting place: North Grove Cemetery, Celina
- Party: Democratic
- Spouse: Addie Ellsworth
- Children: three
- Education: Portland Indiana Normal School

Samuel J. Vining (March 22, 1854 – October 15, 1914) was a politician from the U.S. State of Ohio. He was the Speaker of the Ohio House of Representatives in 1911 and 1912.

== Early life ==
Samuel J. Vining was born at South Salem, Indiana on March 3, 1864. His parents moved to Ohio in his infancy, and he lived on a farm until age thirty-two. He attended the common school until age seventeen, and then began teaching. He attended the normal school at Portland, Indiana, and taught in winters for fifteen years, farming during summer months. He also read law for two years, but never applied for admission to the bar.

== Political career ==
Vining was justice of the peace for five years, and resigned that office. He was elected as a Democrat as Clerk of Court in Mercer County, Ohio in 1896, and was re-elected in 1899. He was elected to the Ohio House of Representatives in 1980, and was re-elected, unopposed, in 1910. In 1911, his colleagues chose him for Speaker.

== Personal ==
Mr. Vining had a residence, real-estate, and insurance businesses in Celina, Ohio, and was a member of the Knights of Pythias, Independent Order of Odd Fellows, Modern Woodmen of America, Fraternal Order of Eagles, and D. O. O. K.

Vining married Addie Ellsworth from Auglaize County, Ohio on February 8, 1887. They had children named Vernon E., Valley Echo, and Leo Heath, who all attended Ohio Wesleyan University.

Vining died of appendicitis in 1914 at Celina.

Ohio House of Representatives
Preceded by Jasper J. McLaughlin	Representative from Mercer County; 1909-1912	Succeeded by G.J.C. Wintermute
