= E. J. Hopple =

American politician (1881–1941)

Elden James Hopple
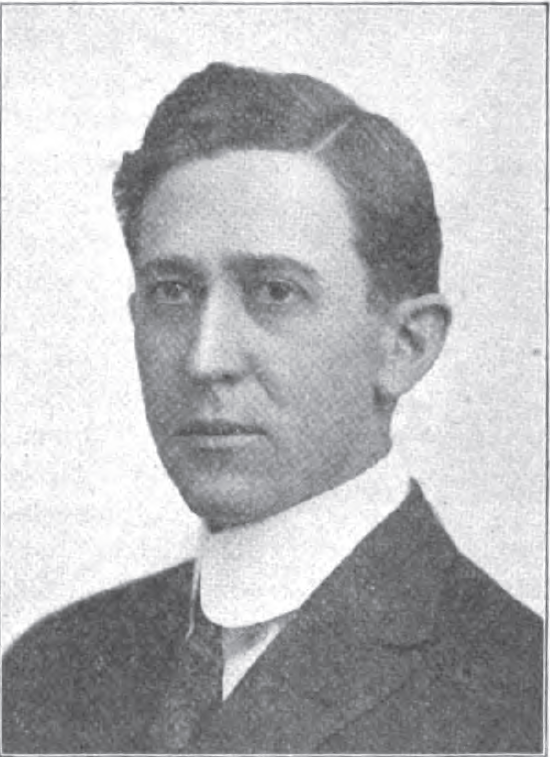
- circa 1916
- Born: February 5, 1881; Crawford County, Ohio, US
- Died: October 11, 1941 (aged 60)
- Education: Heidelberg College; Case Western Reserve University School of Law

E. J. Hopple (February 5, 1881 – October 11, 1941) was a Democratic politician in the U.S. state of Ohio who was in the Ohio Senate and Speaker of the Ohio House of Representatives 1917–1918.

== Biography ==
Mr. Hopple was born on a farm in Crawford County, Ohio. He received a public school education, and attended Heidelberg College and Western Reserve Law School. He read law with W. C. McCullough of Bucyrus, Ohio, and was admitted to the bar in 1905, and set up practice in Cleveland, Ohio.

In 1912 he was married to Elizabeth Benoit of Montgomery, Vermont. He held no offices before being elected to the Ohio Senate. He was elected to represent the 25th district in 1912 for the 80th General Assembly. He was re-elected for the 81st General Assembly in 1914, and selected floor leader of the minority party in 1915.

For the 82nd General Assembly, 1917–1918, Hopple was elected to the Ohio House of Representatives, where he was selected Speaker.

Hopple belonged to the Masons, Knights of Pythias, and Cleveland Chamber of Commerce.

== Notes ==
Ohio House of Representatives
Preceded by Charles D. Conover	Speaker of the Ohio House; 1917-1918	Succeeded by Carl R. Kimball
