= David L. Sleeper =

American politician (1856–1914)

David Lawrence Sleeper
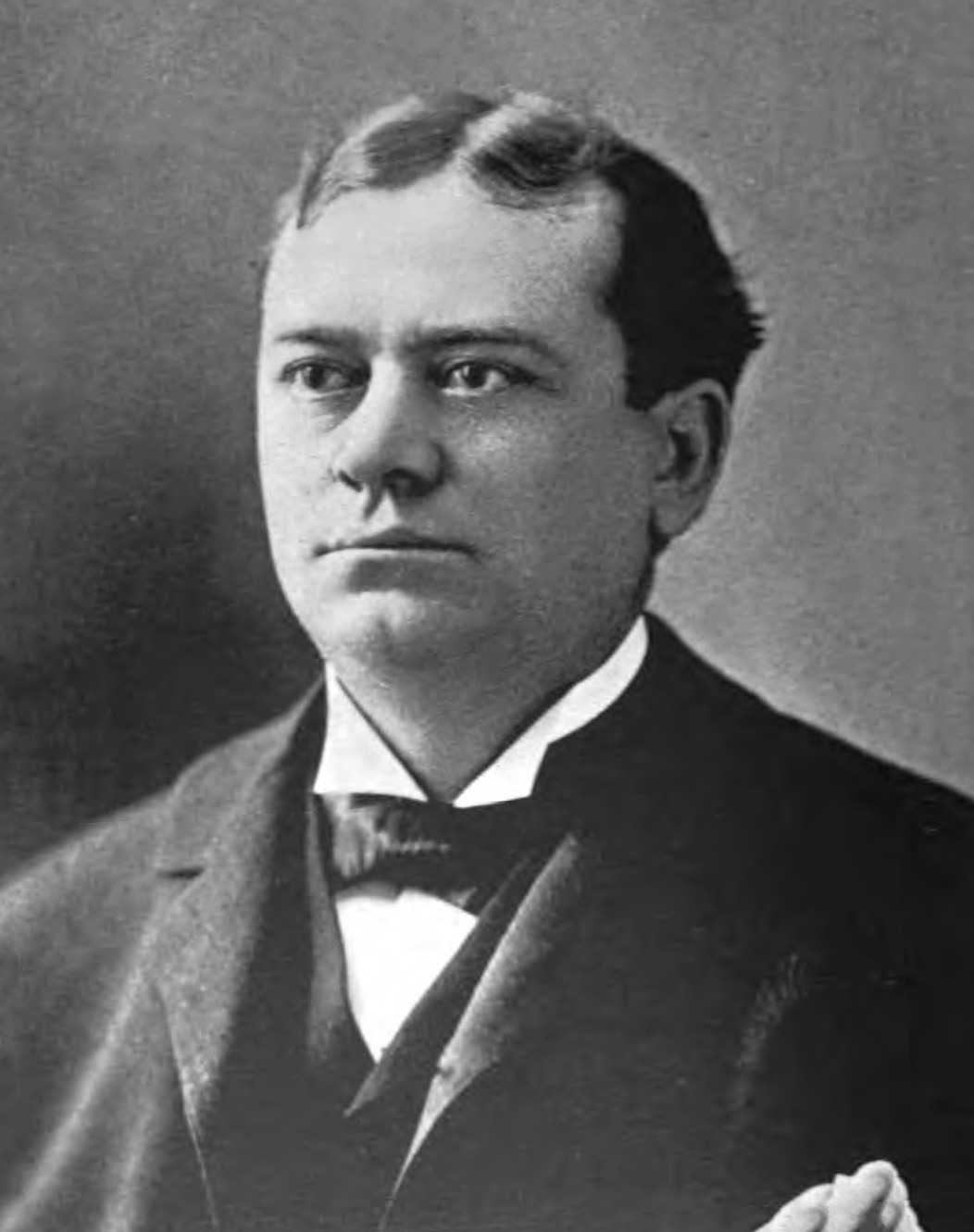

Member of the Ohio House of Representatives from the Athens County district
- In office January 3, 1894 – January 2, 1898
- Preceded by: William L. Keissinger
- Succeeded by: Josiah M. Allen

Personal details
- Born: June 15, 1856 Iowa, US
- Died: March 31, 1914 (aged 57) Tulsa, Oklahoma, US
- Resting place: Highland Cemetery, Lawton, Oklahoma
- Party: Republican
- Spouse: Della Burson
- Children: five
- Education: Otterbein University; Cincinnati Law School

David Lawrence Sleeper (1856-1914) was a Republican politician in the U.S. state of Ohio who was Speaker of the Ohio House of Representatives 1896-1898.

== Biography ==
David L. Sleeper was born in Iowa on June 15, 1856. He attended Otterbein University in Westerville, Ohio and taught school for five years.

Sleeper graduated from Cincinnati Law School in 1880, and practiced law at Athens, Ohio. From 1885 to 1891 he was prosecuting attorney for Athens County. He was elected to the 71st General Assembly of the Ohio House of Representatives, (1894-1896), as a Republican. He was re-elected to the 72nd General Assembly, (1896-1898), when he was selected by his peers as Speaker.

In 1896, Sleeper moved to Columbus, Ohio, where he practiced law.

David L. Sleeper was married November 7, 1877 to Mary Dell "Della" Burson of Athens County, Ohio. They had five children. He was a Scottish Rite Mason, Elk, and member of the I.O.O.F.

He died suddenly March 31, 1914 of apoplexy, and is buried in Lawton, Oklahoma.

Ohio House of Representatives
Preceded by Alexander Boxwell	Speaker of the Ohio House; 1896-1898	Succeeded by Harry C. Mason
