= Arlington G. Reynolds =

American politician (1849–1934)

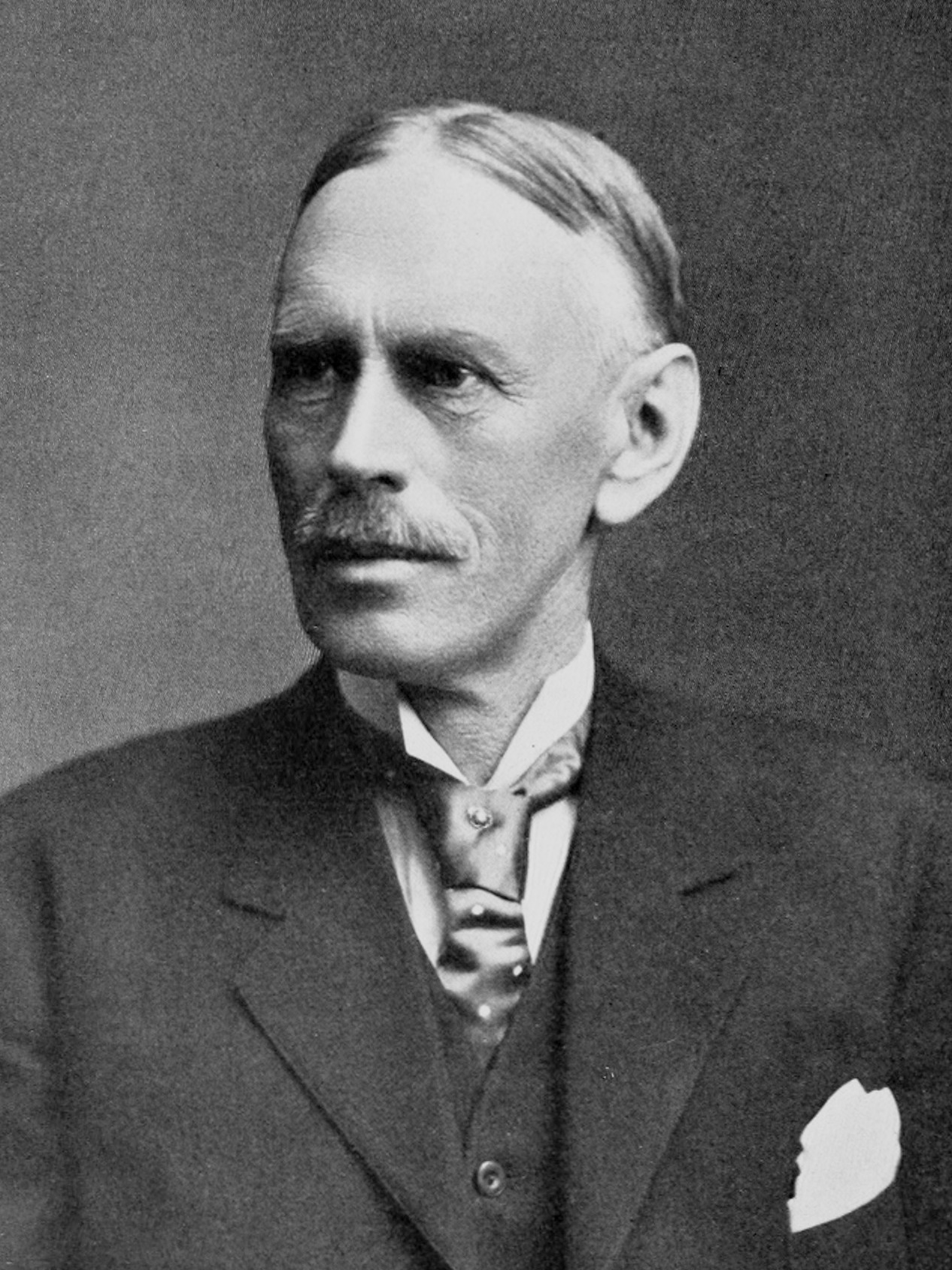

Speaker of the Ohio House of Representatives
- In office January 1, 1900 – January 5, 1902
- Preceded by: Harry C. Mason
- Succeeded by: William S. McKinnon

Personal details
- Born: November 24, 1849 Mentor, Ohio, U.S.
- Died: July 14, 1934 (aged 84)
- Resting place: Mentor Cemetery, Mentor, Ohio
- Party: Republican
- Spouse: Helen E. Whitney
- Children: one
- Education: Oberlin College
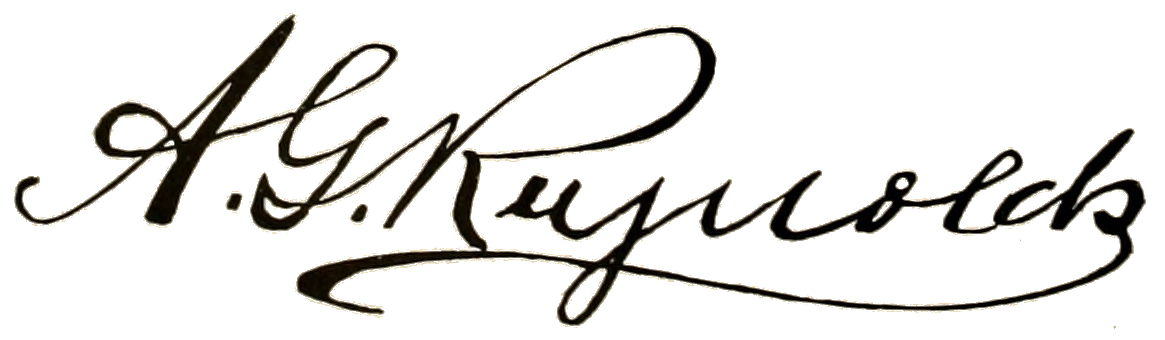
- Signature

Arlington G. Reynolds (November 24, 1849 – July 14, 1934) was a Republican politician in the U.S. state of Ohio who was Speaker of the Ohio House of Representatives 1900–1901.

== Biography ==
Arlington G. Reynolds was born on a farm in Mentor, Lake County, Ohio, educated in the local schools, the Collegiate Institute in Willoughby, and Oberlin College. He read law with Judge G. N. Tuttle of Painesville, and in 1882 was admitted to the bar.

In September 1882, Reynolds located to Des Moines, Iowa, where he was employed by a large farm implement manufacturer for two years. He returned to Painesville where he practiced alone until 1889, when he began a partnership with Judge Perry Bosworth, who died in 1890. He partnered with C.W. Osborne in 1897, and from 1905–1909 with George W. Alvord.

From 1891 to 1896, Reynolds was probate judge of Lake County. In 1896 and 1898, he was elected mayor of Painesville. In the summer of 1897, he was nominated at the Republican county convention for representative to the Ohio House. He won the general election, and served in the 73rd General Assembly, (1898–1899), and was re-elected to the 74th, (1900–1901). In the 74th General Assembly, he was chosen Speaker of the Ohio House. In 1909, he was appointed by the Governor to a vacancy on the common pleas bench.

Mr. Reynolds was a trustee of Lake Erie College starting in 1898. He was vice-president of the Ohio division of the Sons of the American Revolution. In 1882, he was married to Helen E. Whitney of Mentor. They had one daughter named Luella V. He was a Methodist

== Notes ==
Ohio House of Representatives
Preceded by Harry C. Mason	Speaker of the Ohio House; 1900–1901	Succeeded by William S. McKinnon
Preceded by Turhand G. Hart	Representative from Lake County; 1898–1901	Succeeded by Homer N. Kimball
