= Orlando J. Hodge =

American politician (1828–1912)

Orlando John Hodge
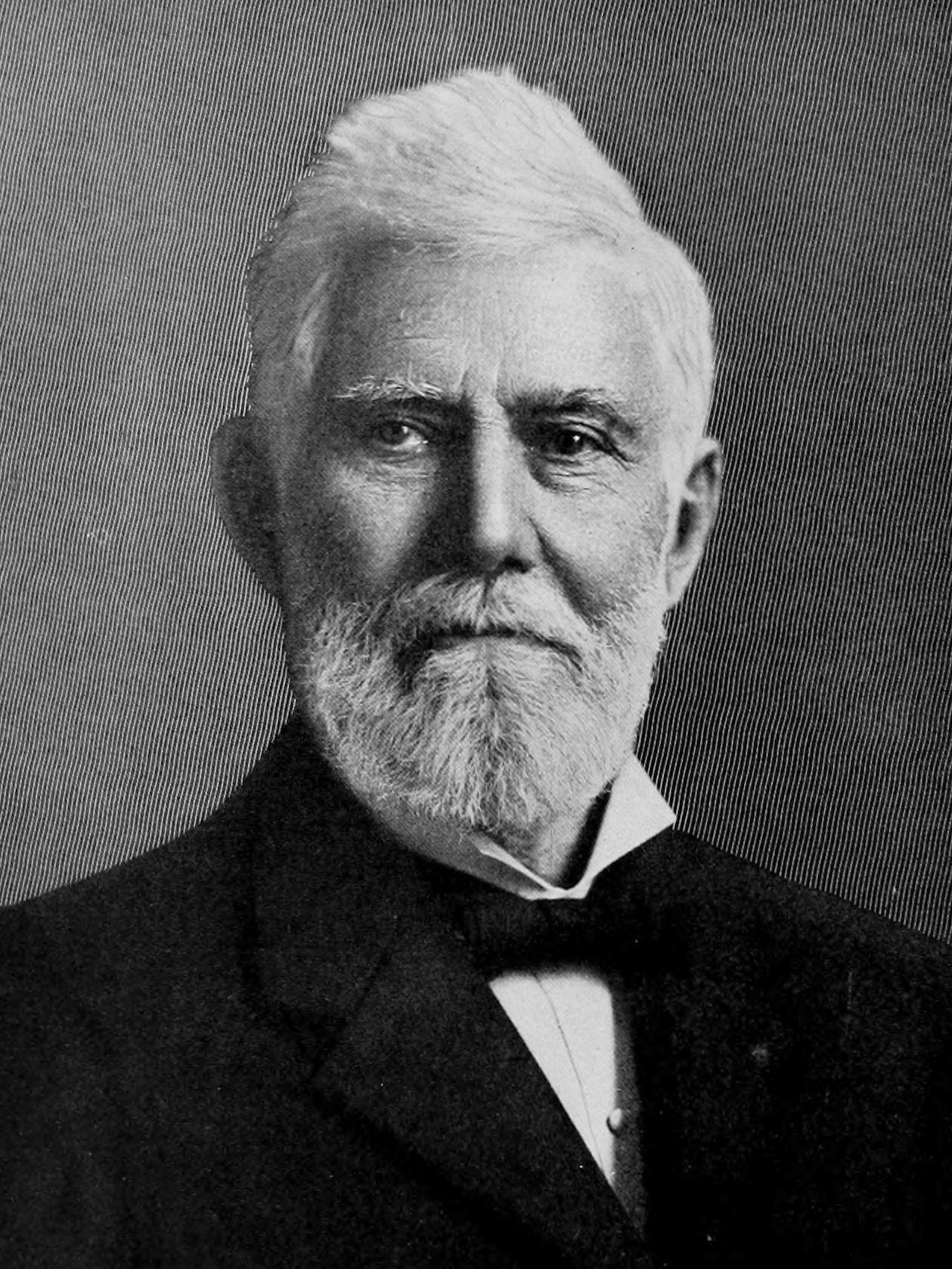

Speaker of the Ohio House of Representatives
- In office January 2, 1882 – January 6, 1884
- Preceded by: Thomas A. Cowgill
- Succeeded by: Archelaus D. Marsh

Personal details
- Born: November 25, 1828 Hamburg, New York
- Died: April 16, 1912 (aged 83) Cleveland, Ohio
- Resting place: Lake View Cemetery
- Party: Republican
- Spouses: Lydia R. Doan; Virginia Shedd Clark
- Children: one
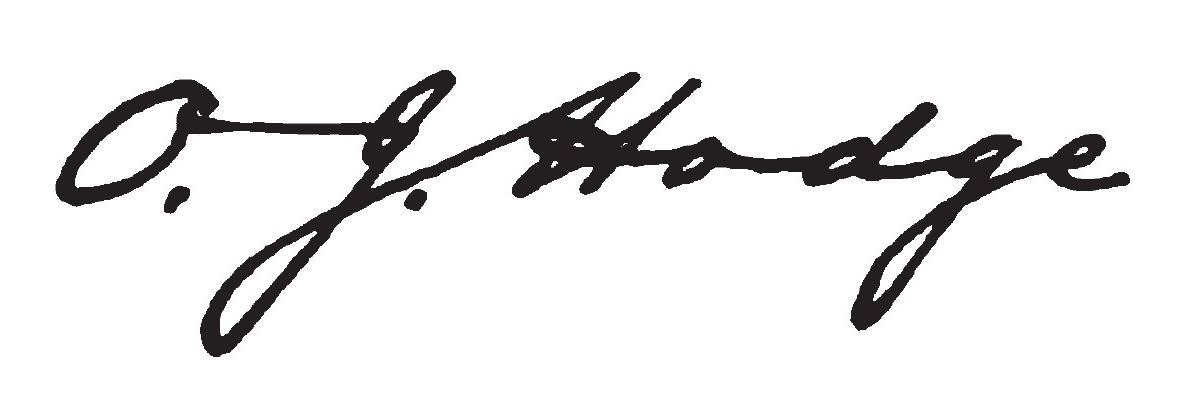
- Signature

Military service
- Allegiance: United States
- Branch/service: Ohio Militia
- Battles/wars: Mexican–American War

Orlando John Hodge (1828–1912) was a legislative leader in two U.S. States.

== Youth and military ==
Orlando J. Hodge was born November 25, 1828, in Hamburg, New York. He was a fifth-generation American, with most of his ancestors living in Connecticut. His father, Alfred Hodge, was born in 1795 and was a War of 1812 veteran who died July 11, 1832. His mother was Sophia English, born in Connecticut in 1795, who died January 13, 1846.

In 1842, Hodge moved to Cleveland, Ohio, where he was employed in a printing shop. He volunteered for the Mexican–American War in 1847. He travelled to New York, boarded a ship, and headed for the war. The ship sank, and Hodge was rescued and taken to Cuba, where he found his way to Mexico. He fought for sixteen months in Mexico, and received two wounds to his leg, which ended his military career.

From 1849 to 1851, Hodge attended the Geauga Seminary at Chester, Ohio, where his classmates included James A. Garfield and Lucretia Rudolph. He was elected first clerk of the Cleveland police court two years later.

== Public service ==
In 1860, Hodge went to Litchfield County, Connecticut, to settle an estate, planning a short stay. He ended up spending seven years there. In 1862, he was a member of the Connecticut House of Representatives, and a member of the Connecticut State Senate in 1864 and 1865. In 1865 he was President Pro-Tempore of the State Senate, although he was the youngest member of the body. He was sent to the front lines of the American Civil War twice by Governor William A. Buckingham. He was postmaster of Robertsville, Connecticut, for six years, and was a member of the Board of Managers of Yale University for one year.

In 1867, Hodge returned to Cleveland. He was elected to three terms on Cleveland City Council, (1871–1877), being president of council in 1876. He was on council again 1885–1886, and was again president of council. He was elected to a Cuyahoga County seat in the Ohio House of Representatives for the 61st and 62nd General Assemblies (1874–1877). He was elected again to the 65th General Assembly, (1882–1883) He was selected by his peers as Speaker for that session. He returned again for the 69th General Assembly, (1890–1891). He lost to Tom L. Johnson for Ohio's 21st congressional district in 1892.

== Journalism and business career ==
From 1878 to 1889, Hodge was editor and owner of the Sun and Voice. He published the "Hodge Genealogy" in 1890, and the two volume "Reminiscences" in 1892. He was one of the original members of the Board of Trade in 1848, and active in the Chamber of Commerce. He was president of the Economy Building and Loan Company, and the Lion Oil Company. He also was a large dealer and owner of real estate. He joined the I.O.O.F. in 1858. He was admitted to the bar in 1874, but never practiced. In 1889, Ohio Governor Joseph B. Foraker appointed Hodge to his military staff, after which he acquired the title "Colonel Hodge".

== Personal ==
On October 15, 1855, Hodge married Lydia R. Doan. She died September 13, 1879, and their only child, Clark R. Hodge, was born July 16, 1857, and died November 29, 1880. Hodge married again on April 25, 1882, to Virginia (Shedd) Clark.

== Death ==
On the evening of April 16, 1912, Hodge spoke to the Cleveland Chamber of Commerce at their annual meeting. Loud and long applause followed his speech as he took his seat. A fifteen-minute recess was called before continuing the program, during which Hodge fell ill. He was removed to another room, where he died a few moments later. He was interred at Lake View Cemetery.

== Notes ==
Ohio House of Representatives
Preceded by several	Representative from Cuyahoga County; 1874–1877; Served alongside: several	Succeeded by several
Preceded by several	Representative from Cuyahoga County; 1882–1883; Served alongside: several	Succeeded by several
Preceded by several	Representative from Cuyahoga County; 1890–1891; Served alongside: several	Succeeded by several
Political offices
Preceded by John T. Adams	Presidents pro tempore of the Connecticut Senate; 1865	Succeeded by John T. Wait
