= Nial R. Hysell =

American politician (1854–1921)

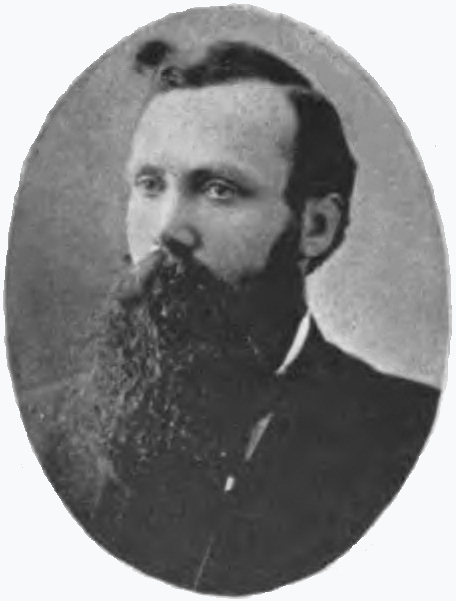

Speaker of the Ohio House of Representatives
- In office January 6, 1890 – January 3, 1892
- Preceded by: Elbert L. Lampson
- Succeeded by: Lewis C. Laylin

Personal details
- Born: October 10, 1854 Pomeroy, Ohio, US
- Died: October 21, 1921 (aged 67) Meigs County, Ohio, US
- Resting place: Bradford Cemetery, Bradford, Ohio
- Party: Democratic
- Spouse: Analda R. Dining

Nial R. Hysell (10 October 1854 – 21 October 1921) was a politician from the U.S. State of Ohio who served as Speaker of the Ohio House of Representatives from 1890 to 1892.

== Biography ==
Hysell was born October 10, 1854, at Pomeroy, Ohio. After a few months of school he began working in a coal mine as a boy. He studied in his leisure hours, and acquired some education. He worked as a coal miner until 1884. In 1884, Hysell was elected vice-president of the miner's organization, serving for three years. He then was president of the state trade assembly for three years. He represented Perry County in the Ohio House of Representatives from 1888 to 1892 as a Democrat, and was Speaker of the House 1890 to 1892. He then read law and was admitted to the bar in 1893. He was elected to the Ohio State Senate for the tenth district, Franklin & Pickaway counties, from 1896 to 1898 after moving to Columbus.

== Personal ==
Hysell married Analda R. Dining in 1875.

== Bibliography ==
- Mercer, James K; Vallandigham, C N (1896). Representative men of Ohio, 1896-97. Columbus: Mercer and Vallandigham. p. 94.
- Ohio General Assembly (1917). Manual of legislative practice in the General Assembly. State of Ohio.

Ohio House of Representatives
Preceded by Joseph G. Huffman	Representative from Perry County; 1888-1892	Succeeded by John D. Axline
Ohio Senate
Preceded by Moses B. Earnhart	Senator from 10th District; 1896-1898; Served alongside: Thaddeus E. Cromley	Succeeded by Thaddeus E. Cromley; John C. L. Pugh
