= John Clay Entrekin =

Ohio legislator

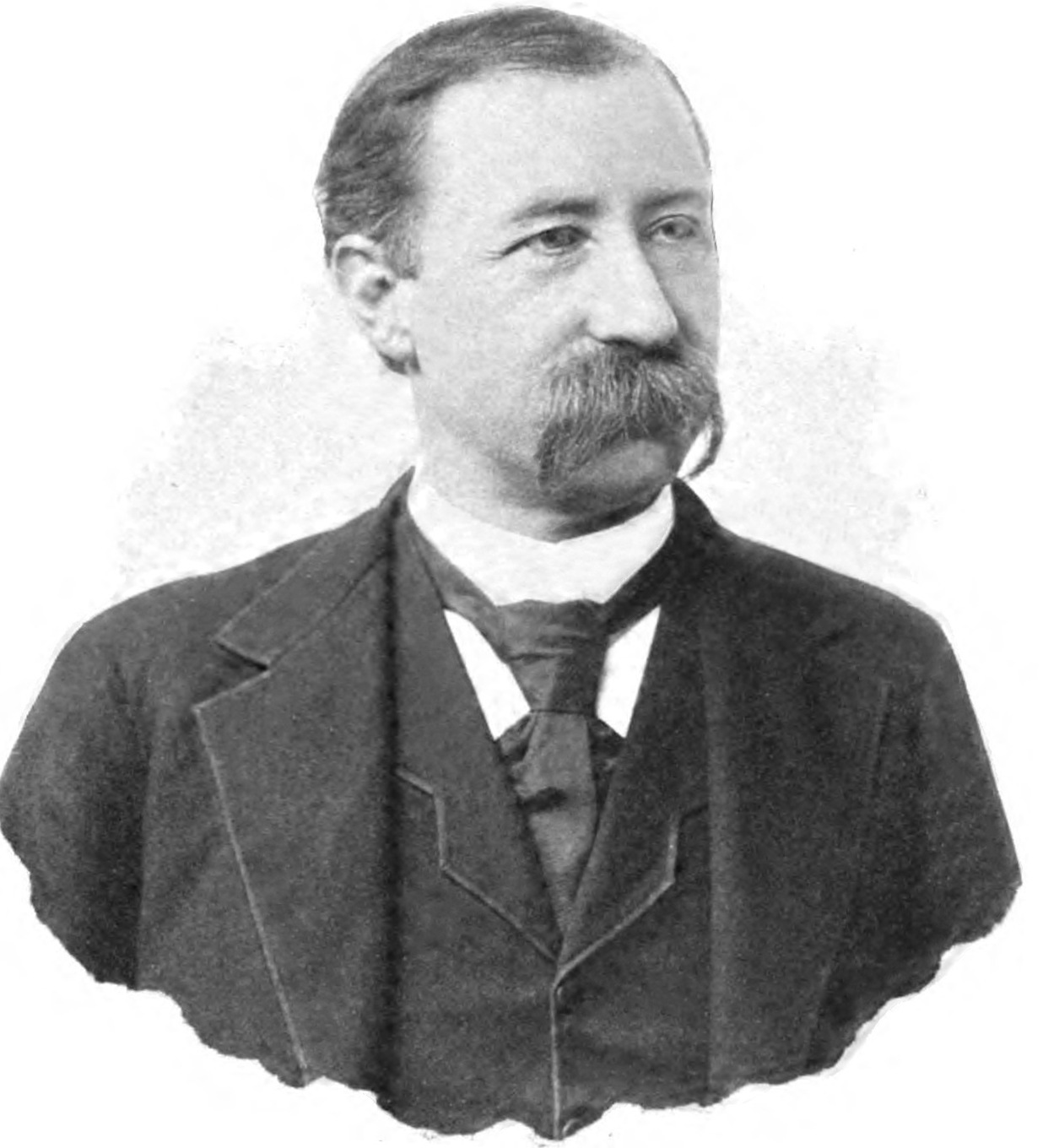

Member of the Ohio Senate from the 6th district
- In office January 5, 1880 – January 1, 1882
- Preceded by: John McDonald
- Succeeded by: William H. Reed

Personal details
- Born: February 11, 1844 Green Township, Ross County, Ohio, US
- Died: April 26, 1905 (aged 61) Chillicothe, Ohio, US
- Resting place: Grandview Cemetery (Chillicothe, Ohio)
- Party: Republican
- Spouse: Mary F. Bethauser
- Children: two
- Education: Ohio Wesleyan University

Military service
- Allegiance: United States
- Branch/service: United States Army
- Years of service: August 12, 1862 - June 8, 1865
- Rank: private
- Unit: 114th Ohio Infantry

John Clay Entrekin (1844–1905) was a Republican politician from Chillicothe, Ohio. He was the Speaker of the Ohio House of Representatives from 1886 to 1888.

John Clay Entrekin was born at Green Township, Ross County, Ohio on February 11, 1844. He was the son of John and Fanny (Moore) Entrekin. He began teaching school, and enlisted in Company A, 114th Ohio Infantry on August 12, 1862, during the American Civil War. He was injured by shell and recovered, and later by gunshot at the Battle of Fort Blakeley, Alabama. He did not recover from the latter in time to take up arms again, and was discharged June 8, 1865.

Entrekin enrolled at Ohio Wesleyan University, and graduated two years later in 1867. He was a professor of mathematics at Central Wesleyan College, Warrenton, Missouri for two years, and was admitted to the bar at that place in June, 1870. He returned to Chillicothe, Ohio, and was admitted to the Ohio bar in September 1870.

Entrekin was elected a member of the Ohio House of Representatives from Ross County for the 62nd Ohio General Assembly, (1876-1878). He was a member of the Ohio State Senate from the 6th district for the 64th General Assembly, (1880-1882).

Entrekin was a member of the Ohio House for the 67th General Assembly, (1886-1888). After a number of seats in Hamilton County held by Democrats were contested, and then awarded to Republicans, he was elected Speaker for that session. He was city solicitor of Chillicothe from 1872 to 1877, and a member of city council 1877 to 1881.

Entrekin was a member of the Ohio National Guard beginning June 6, 1873. His rank increased from First Lieutenant to Brigadier General. Ohio Governor William McKinley named him Judge Advocate General of the state. He was a member of the Republican State Committee in 1883 and 1884, and a delegate to the Republican National Convention in 1892.

John Clay Entrekin married Mary F. Bethauser, daughter of German immigrants, on July 15, 1874. They had a son and a daughter. He died at Chillicothe on April 26, 1905, and was buried at Grandview Cemetery.

== Notes ==
Ohio House of Representatives
Preceded by Milton McCoy	Representative from Ross County; 1876-1878	Succeeded by William H. Reed
Preceded by Oliver P. Goodman	Representative from Ross County; 1886-1888	Succeeded by William H. Reed
Preceded by Archelaus D. Marsh	Speaker of the House; 1886-1888	Succeeded by Elbert L. Lampson
