= Harlem Springs, Ohio =

Unincorporated community in Ohio, US

Coordinates: 40°31′15″N 81°00′11″W

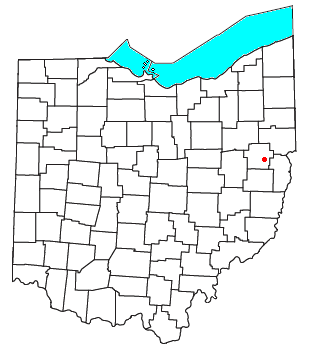
Location of Harlem Springs, Ohio

Harlem Springs is an unincorporated community in central Lee Township, Carroll County, Ohio, United States. It lies along State Route 43. The community is part of the Canton–Massillon Metropolitan Statistical Area.

== History ==
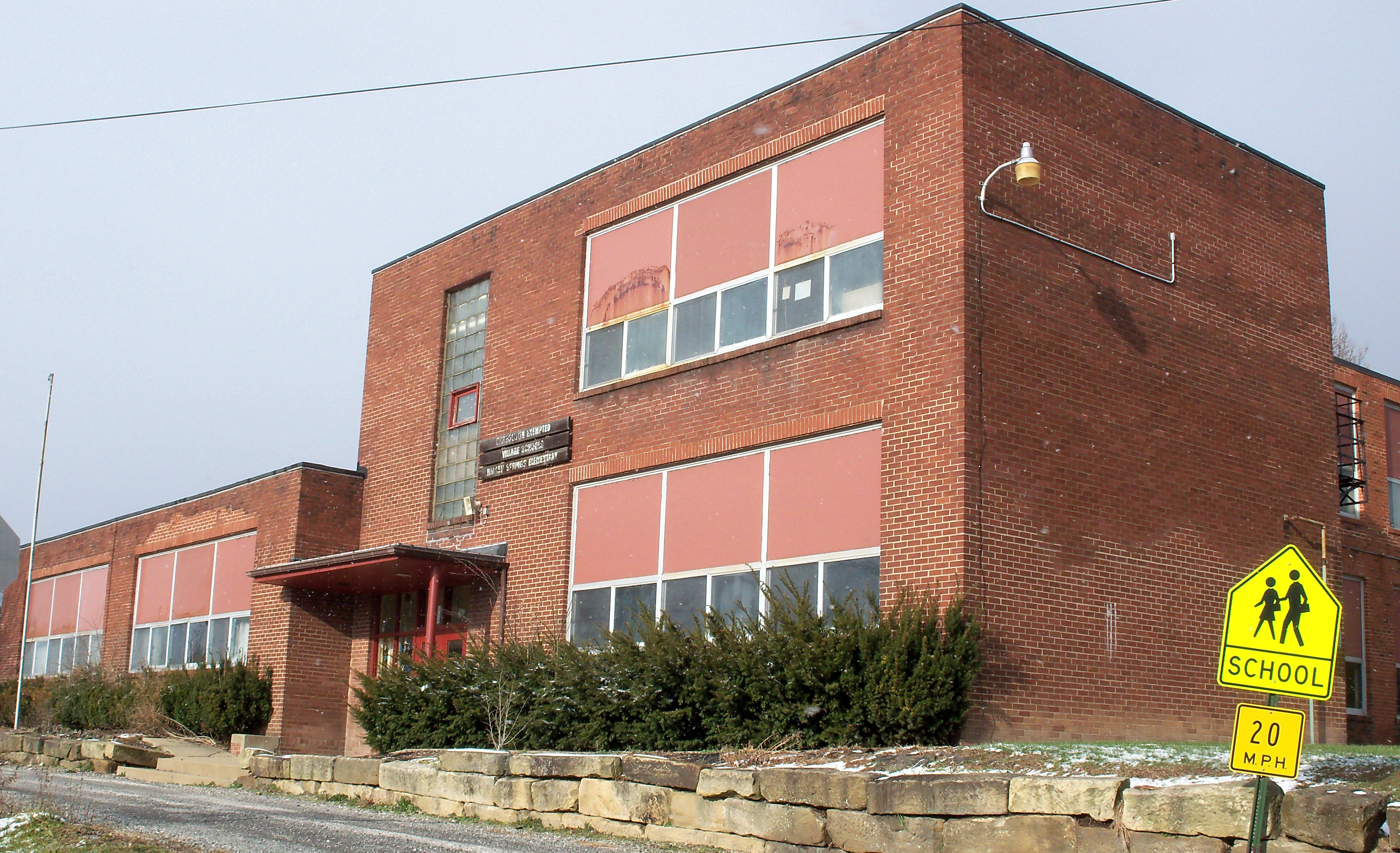
The Old School

The village was established by Isaac Wiggins on March 15, 1832 as "Harlem" on the site of natural springs

== Education ==
Students attend the Carrollton Exempted Village School District

From 1858 to 1867 the Rural Seminary, also known as Harlem Springs College inhabited the town. It later moved and became known as Scio College and eventually merged with Mount Union College.
