= James E. Neal =

American politician

Speaker of the Ohio House of Representatives
- In office January 7, 1878 – January 3, 1880
- Preceded by: Charles H. Grosvenor
- Succeeded by: Thomas A. Cowgill

Personal details
- Born: February 21, 1846 Hamilton, Ohio, US
- Died: April 18, 1908 (aged 62) Hamilton, Ohio, US
- Party: Democratic
- Spouse: May McKinney
- Children: one daughter

James E. Neal was a Democratic legislator from Hamilton, Ohio who was Speaker of the Ohio House of Representatives in 1878 and 1879.

James E. Neal was born in Hamilton, Ohio, on February 21, 1846. He was the son of James A. and Margaret (Giffen) Neal. He graduated from the high school in Hamilton in 1862. He then studied law under the direction of Robert Christy, and was admitted to the bar. He established a lucrative practice.

Neal was elected to the Ohio House of Representatives for the 62nd and 63rd General Assemblies, (1876 to 1879). During the 63rd General Assembly, (1878 to 1879), the Democrats had the majority, and elected Neal as Speaker of the Ohio House of Representatives.

Neal was a member of the court-house building commission in his county that led to erection of a new courthouse. He was appointed during President Grover Cleveland's second term as United States consul to Liverpool, England.

James Neal married May McKinney on June 5, 1882 in Hamilton. They had one daughter. He was a member of the B.P.O.E. He died at Hamilton on April 18, 1908.

== Notes ==
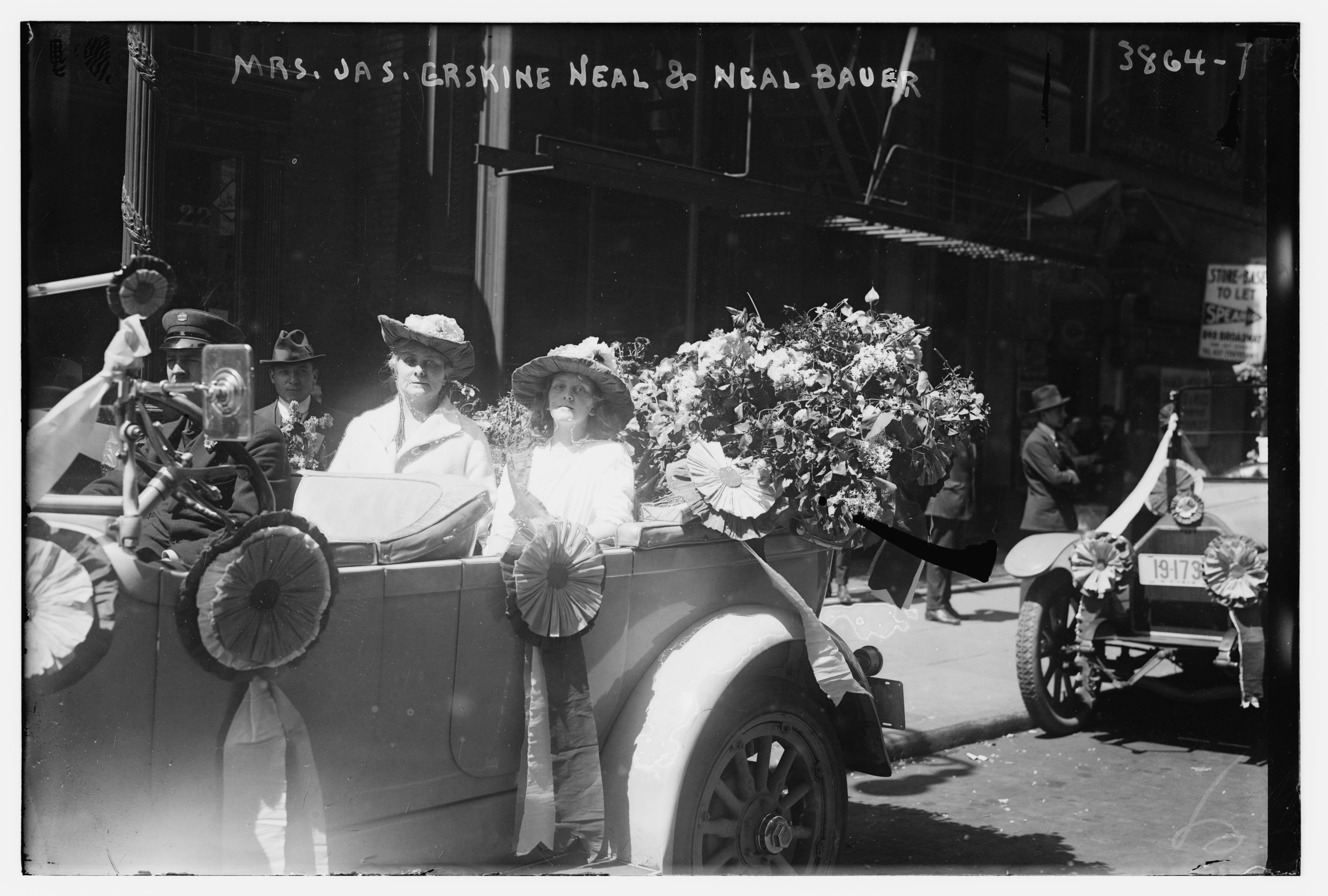
Mrs. Neal and daughter Shirley, 1916

Ohio House of Representatives
Preceded by Jacob Kemp	Representative from Butler County; 1876–1879; Served alongside: Jacob Kemp (1876–7); Horace P. Clough (1878–9)	Succeeded by John R. Brown
