= Scio College =

Former college in Ohio (1857–1911)

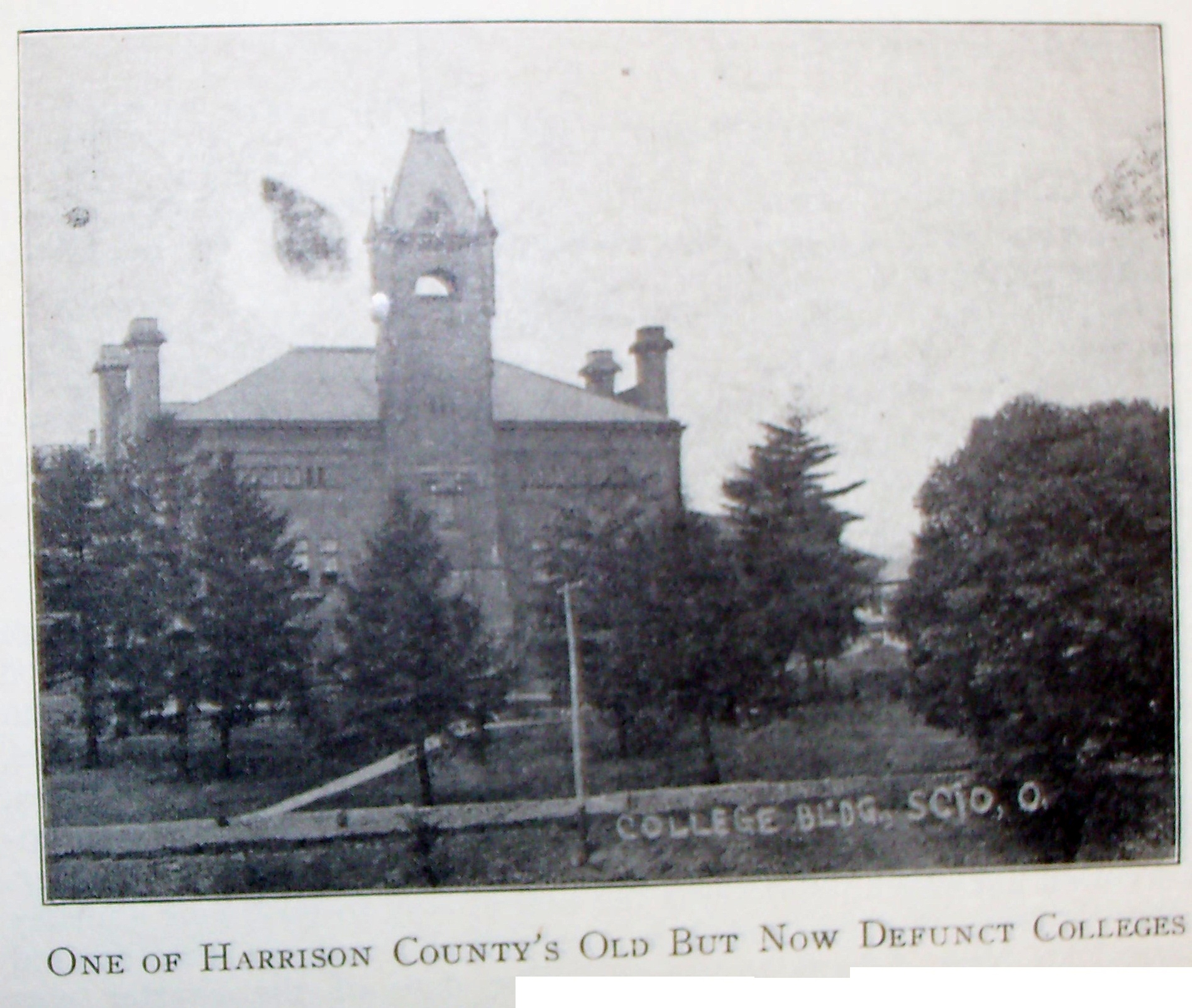
- Former names: New Market College; The One Study University
- Active: 1857–1911
- Location: Scio, Ohio, United States; 40.3958°N 81.0897°W

Scio College (/ˈsaɪ.oʊ/ SY-oh) was an institution of higher education in Ohio in the late 19th and early 20th centuries. Parts of it merged into Mount Union College, while its pharmacy school merged with what would become the University of Pittsburgh School of Pharmacy.

The institution was first organized under the name Rural Seminary in 1857 at Harlem Springs, Ohio, as a Methodist Episcopal Church seminary. In 1867 it relocated to New Market Station, Ohio, and adopted the name New Market College. In 1875 it took the name The One Study University. This was to reflect its plan of having students only take classes in their major and nothing else. This plan was abandoned in 1878 and the school adopted the name of Scio College, New Market Station having been renamed to Scio.

By the early 20th century enrollment was declining. In 1908 the College of Pharmacy at Scio College broke away and merged with the Pittsburgh College of Pharmacy, now known as the University of Pittsburgh School of Pharmacy. In 1911 the rest of the college merged with Mount Union College.
