= Ohio gubernatorial elections =

The voters of the U.S. state of Ohio elect a governor for a four year term. There is a term limit of two consecutive terms as governor. Bold type indicates victor. Italic type indicates incumbent. Starting in 1978, the nominees for governor and lieutenant governor ran on a joint ticket.

== Primaries ==
=== Democratic Party ===
Year	Nominee	First Runner-Up	Other Candidates
2026	**Amy Acton** and David Pepper: 767,360		
2022	**Nan Whaley** and Cheryl Stephens : 331,014		
2018	**Richard Cordray** and Betty Sutton : 423,264		
2014	**Ed FitzGerald** and Sharen Neuhardt : 366,056	Larry Ealy and Ken Gray: 74,197	
2010	**Ted Strickland** and Yvette McGee Brown : 630,785		
2006	**Ted Strickland** and Lee Fisher: 634,105	Bryan Flannery and Frank Stams: 166,251	Bob Fitrakis (G) and Anita Rios (G): 38,796
2002	**Timothy Hagan** and Charleta B. Tavares: 467,572		
1998	**Lee Fisher** and Michael B. Coleman: 663,832		
1994	**Robert L. Burch Jr.** and Peter Lawson Jones: 408,161	Peter Michael Schuller and Paul Kent Myers: 286,276	
1990	**Anthony J. "Tony" Celebrezze Jr.** and Eugene Branstool: 683,932	Michael Hugh Lord and Judy Wynn Parker: 131,564	Daniel A. Ciofani and Robert M. Galvin: 145; Henry King and Sandra King (WI): 46
1986	**Richard F. Celeste** and Paul R. Leonard: 684,206	Guy Templeton Black and Barbara Arnold Massey (WI): 880	
1982	**Richard F. Celeste** and Myrl H. Shoemaker: 436,887	William J. Brown and Charles A. Vanik: 383,007	Gerald N. "Jerry" Springer and Kenneth M. Keefe: 210,524
1978	**Richard F. Celeste** and Michael J. Dorrian: 491,524	Dale R. Reusch and Robert J. Sttrittmatter: 88,134	
1974	**John J. Gilligan**: 713,488	James D. Nolan: 297,244	Donald E. Dillon (WI): 88; Dale E. Reusch (WI): 33
1970	John J. Gilligan: 547,675	Robert E. Sweeney: 216,195	Mark McElroy: 153,702
1962	Henry Frazier Reams Jr.: 326,419	Harry H. McIlwain: 231,406	
1966	**Michael V. DiSalle**: 331,463	Mark McElroy: 299,207	Alexander G. Metrakos: 27,740
1958	Michael V. DiSalle: 242,830	Anthony J. Celebrezze Sr.: 140,453	Albert S. Porter: 108,498; Robert N. Gorman: 57,694; M. E. Sensenbrenner: 52,350; Clingan Jackson: 35,175; Vivienne L. Suarez: 6,928
1956	Michael V. DiSalle: 279,831	John E. Sweeney: 106,071	Robert W. Reider: 41,224; Frank X. Kryzan: 37,290; Oscar L. Fleckner: 23,081
1954	**Frank J. Lausche**: 338,799		
1952	**Frank J. Lausche**: 511,153		
1952	**Frank J. Lausche**: 366,397	Clarence H. Knisley: 63,165	Joseph Torok Jr.: 16,651
1948	Frank J. Lausche: 332,596	Ray T. Miller: 138,998	Robert S. Cox: 17,344; Joseph Torok Jr.: 6,337
1946	**Frank J. Lausche**: 291,635	Joseph Torok Jr.: 35,269	
1944	Frank J. Lausche: 179,961	Martin L. Sweeney: 64,227	James W. Huffman: 38,124; Henry Frazier Reams Sr.: 26,074; Frank A. Dye: 10,862; Walter Baertschi: 8,402
1942	John McSweeney: 119,698	Joseph T. Ferguson: 101,508	Clarence J. Knisley: 44,178; Walter F. Heer: 41,633; Frank A. Dye: 11,630
1940	Martin L. Davey: 304,509	George White: 123,729	William J. Kennedy: 86,530; Herbert S. Duffy: 31,401; Harold G. Mosier: 19,449; James F. Flynn: 14,267; Frank A. Dye: 7,359

=== Republican Party ===
Year	Nominee	First Runner-Up	Other Candidates
2026	Vivek Ramaswamy: 676,562 (82.4%)	Casey Putsch: 144,184 (17.6%)	
2022	Mike DeWine: 519,594 (48.1%)	Jim Renacci: 302,494 (28%)	
2018	Mike DeWine: 494,766 (59.8%)	Mary Taylor: 332,273 (40.2%)	
2014	John Kasich: 559,671 (Unopposed)		
2010	John Kasich: 746,719 (Unopposed)		
2006	Ken Blackwell: 460,349 (55.7%)	Jim Petro: 365,618 (44.3%)	
2002	Bob Taft: 552,491 (Unopposed)		
1998	Bob Taft: 691,946 (Unopposed)		
1994	George Voinovich: 750,781 (Unopposed)		
1990	George Voinovich: 645,224 (Unopposed)		
1986	Jim Rhodes: 352,261 (48.2%)	Paul E. Gillmor: 281,737 (38.5%)	Paul E. Pfeifer: 96,948 (13.3%)
1982	Clarence "Bud" Brown, Jr.: 347,176 (51.5%)	Seth Taft: 153,806 (22.8%)	Tom Van Meter: 136,761 (20.3%); Bob Teater: 35,821 (5.3%)
1978	Jim Rhodes: 393,632 (67.7%)	Charles F. Kurfess: 187,544 (32.3%)	
1974	Jim Rhodes: 385,669 (62.8%)	Charles E. Fry: 183,899 (29.9%)	Bert Dawson, Jr.: 44,938 (7.3%)
1970	Roger Cloud: 468,369 (50.5%)	Donald "Buz" Lukens: 283,257 (30.5%)	Paul W. Brown: 164,672 (17.7%); Albert Sealy: 11,825 (1.3%); Morton Smith (WI): 8 (0%)
1966	Jim Rhodes: 577,827 (88.7%)	William L. White: 73,428 (11.3%)	
1962	Jim Rhodes: 520,868 (89.7%)	William L. White: 59,916 (10.3%)	
1958	C. William O'Neill: 346,660 (63.6%)	Charles P. Taft II: 198,173 (36.4%)	
1956	C. William O'Neill: 425,947 (72.5%)	John W. Brown: 161,826 (27.5%)	
1954	Jim Rhodes: 400,294 (Unopposed)		
1952	Charles P. Taft II: 413,431 (47.5%)	Thomas J. Herbert: 343,646 (39.5%)	Roscoe R. Walcutt: 113,898 (13.1%)
1950	Don H. Ebright: 338,390 (62.7%)	Jim Rhodes: 157,346 (29.1%)	Edward J. Hummel: 25,447 (4.7%); George V. Woodling: 18,947 (3.5%)
1948	Thomas J. Herbert: 575,054 (87.1%)	William L. White: 52,763 (8%)	Albert E. Payne: 32,421 (4.9%)
1946	Thomas J. Herbert: 296,654 (86.8%)	Albert E. Payne: 45,137 (13.2%)	
1944	James Garfield Stewart: 162,802 (34.2%)	Thomas J. Herbert: 160,598 (33.8%)	Paul M. Herbert: 137,359 (28.9%); Albert E. Payne: 14,927 (3.1%)
1942	John W. Bricker: 350,730 (Unopposed)		
1940	John W. Bricker: 612,610 (Unopposed)		

== General elections ==
Year	Democratic	Republican	Libertarian	Green	Others
2026	**Amy Acton** & David Pepper: 2,404,178	Vivek Ramaswamy & Rob McColley: 2,039,730	Don Kissick & James Mills: 151,874	None	None
2022	Nan Whaley & Cheryl Stephens:1,545,489	**Mike DeWine** & **Jon Husted**:2,580,424	None	None	None
2018	Richard Cordray & Betty Sutton:2,070,046	**Mike DeWine** & **Jon Husted**:2,235,825	Travis Irvine & Todd Grayson: 79,985	Constance Gadell-Newton & Brett R. Joseph: 49,475	
2014	Ed FitzGerald & Sharen Neuhardt: 1,009,359	**John Kasich &** **Mary Taylor**: 1,944,848	None	Anita Rios & Bob Fitrakis: 101,706	
2010	Ted Strickland & Yvette McGee Brown:1,812,047	**John Kasich** & **Mary Taylor**:1,889,180	Ken Matesz & Ann Leech: 92,116	Dennis Spisak & M. Anita Rios: 58,475	David Sargent (Write-in) : 635
2006	**Ted Strickland** & Lee Fisher: 2,307,420	J. Kenneth Blackwell & Thomas A. Raga: 1,406,792	William S. Peirce & Mark Noble: 67,596	Bob Fitrakis & Anita Rios: 38,987	
2002	Timothy Hagan & Charleta Tavares: 1,236,924	**Robert A. Taft II** & Jennette Bradley: 1,865,007			John Eastman: 126,686; James Whitman: 291; Eva Braiman (SWP): 84
1998	Lee Fisher & Michael B. Coleman: 1,498,956	**Robert A. Taft II** & Maureen O'Connor: 1,678,721			John R. Mitchel & Lawrence Anderson: 111,468; Zanna Feitler & John A. Eastman: 65,068
1994	Robert L. Burch Jr. & Peter Lawson Jones: 835,849	**George V. Voinovich** & Nancy P. Hollister: 2,401,572			Billy R. Inmon & Norm Myers: 108,745; Keith W. Hatton & Luther E. Willis (WI): 48; Michael Italie & Kibwe Diarra (WI): 24
1990	Anthony J. "Tony" Celebrezze Jr. & Eugene Branstool: 1,539,416	**George V. Voinovich** & R. Michael DeWine: 1,938,103			David Marshall & Margaret Husk: 82; James E. Attia & Henry King: 49
1986	**Richard F. Celeste** & Paul R. Leonard: 1,858,372	James A. Rhodes & Robert A. Taft II: 1,207,264			Thomas V. Brown & Katie S. Smith (WI): 803; Guy Templeton Black & Lottie May Sulzer (WI)L 92; Roberta L. Scherr & Mark J. Rahn (WI): 80
1982	**Richard F. Celeste** & Myrl H. Shoemaker: 1,981,882	Clarence J. "Bud" Brown Jr. & James E. Betts: 1,303,962	Phyllis Goetz & Lee Paolini: 39,114		Erwin J. Reupert & John N. Salierno: 17,484; Kurt O. Landefeld & Rachel H. Knapik: 14,279; Robert Menefee & Jesse Menefee (WI): 7
1978	Richard F. Celeste & Michael J. Dorrian: 1,354,631	**James A. Rhodes** & George V. Voinovich: 1,402,167			Patricia H. Wright & John M. Gaige: 35,164; John O'Neil & Conrad Gutermuth: 29,413; Allan Friedman & Bruce Wood: 21,951; Robert Menefee & Johnnie Menefee Jr. (WI): 25
1974	John J. Gilligan: 1,482,191	James A. Rhodes: 1,493,679			Nancy Brown Lazar: 95,625; Jack A. Snyder (WI): 359; Joseph Pirincin (WI): 113; Byron Anderson (WI): 43
1970	John J. Gilligan: 1,725,560	Roger Cloud: 1,382,659			Edwin G. Lawton (AI): 61,300; Joseph Pirincin (SL): 14,087; John A. Crites (WI): 321; Marcia Sweetenham (WI): 106; Donald R. Lesiak (WI): 100
1966	Henry Frazier Reams Jr.: 1,092,054	**James A. Rhodes**: 1,795,277			
1962	Michael V. DiSalle: 1,280,521	James A. Rhodes: 1,836,432			
1958	Michael V. DiSalle: 1,869,260	C. William O'Neill: 1,414,874			
1956	Michael V. DiSalle: 1,577,103	C. William O'Neill: 1,984,988			
1954	Frank J. Lausche: 1,405,262	James A. Rhodes: 1,192,528			
1952	Frank J. Lausche: 2,015,110	Charles P. Taft II: 1,590,058			
1950	Frank J. Lausche: 1,522,249	Don H. Ebright: 1,370,570			
1948	Frank J. Lausche: 1,619,775	Thomas J. Herbert: 1,398,514			
1946	Frank J. Lausche: 1,125,997	Thomas J. Herbert: 1,166,550			Arla A. Albaugh (SL): 11,203
1944	Frank J. Lausche: 1,603,808	James G. Stewart: 1,491,450			
1942	John McSweeney: 709,599	John W. Bricker: 1,086,937			
1940	Martin L. Davey: 1,460,396	John W. Bricker: 1,824,863			
1938	Charles W. Sawyer : 1,147,323	**John W. Bricker** : 1,265,548			
1936	**Martin L. Davey** : 1,539,461	John W. Bricker : 1,412,773			
1934	**Martin L. Davey** : 1,118,257	Clarence J. Brown Sr. : 1,052,851			
1932	**George White** : 1,356,518	David S. Ingalls : 1,151,933			
1930	**George White** : 1,033,168	Myers Y. Cooper : 923,538			
1928	Martin L. Davey : 1,106,739	**Myers Y. Cooper** : 1,355,517			
1926	**A. Victor Donahey** : 702,733	Myers Y. Cooper : 685,957			
1924	**A. Victor Donahey** : 1,064,981	Harry L. Davis : 888,139			
1922	**A. Victor Donahey** : 821,948	Carmi Thompson : 803,300			
1920	A. Victor Donahey : 918,962	**Harry L. Davis** : 1,039,835			Frank B. Hamilton (socialist) : 42,889; Earl H. Foote (s.t.) : 1,497
1918	**James M. Cox** : 486,403	Frank B. Willis : 474,459			
1916	**James M. Cox** : 568,218	Frank B. Willis : 561,602			Tom Clifford : 36,908; John H. Dickason : 7,347
1914	James M. Cox : 493,804	**Frank B. Willis** : 523,074			James R. Garfield (Progressive) : 60,904; Scott Wilkins (Socialist) : 51,441
1912	**James M. Cox** : 439,323	Robert B. Brown : 272,500			
1910	**Judson Harmon** : 552,569	Warren G. Harding : 376,700			
1908	**Judson Harmon** : 477,077	Andrew L. Harris : 533,197			Robert Bandlow (Soc): 28,573; John B. Martin (Pro): 7,665; Andrew F. Otte (Independence) : 392; John Kircher (Soc Lab) : 797
1905	**John M. Pattison** : 473,264	Myron T. Herrick : 430,617			Isaac Cowen (Soc) : 17,795; Aaron S. Watkins (Pro) : 13,061; John E. Steiger (Soc Lab) : 1,808
1903	Tom L. Johnson : 361,748	**Myron T. Herrick** : 475,560			Nelson D. Creamer (Pro) : 13,502; Isaac Cowen (Soc) : 13,495; John D. Goerke (Soc Lab) :2,071
1901	James Kilbourne : 368,525	**George K. Nash** : 436,092			E. Jay Pinney (Pro) : 9,878; John Richardson (Union Reform) : 2,718; John H T Juergens (Soc Lab) : 2,994; Harry C. Thompson (Socialist) : 7,359
1899	John R. McLean : 368,176	**George K. Nash** : 417,199			Seth H. Ellis : (Union Reform) : 7,799; George M. Hammell (Pro) : 5,825; Robert Bandlow (Soc Lab) : 2,439; Golden Rule Jones (I): 106,721
1897	Horace L. Chapman : 401,750	**Asa S. Bushnell** : 429,915			John C. Holliday (Pro) :7,555; Jacob S. Coxey (Peoples) : 6,276; Julius Dexter (Nat Dem) : 1,662; William Watkins (Soc Lab) : 4,246; Samuel J. Lewis (Negro Protect) : 477; John Richardson (Liberty) :3,105
1895	James E. Campbell : 334,519	**Asa S. Bushnell** : 427,141			Jacob S. Coxey (Pop) : 52,675; Seth H. Ellis (Pro) : 21,264; William Watkins (Soc. Labor) : 1,867
1893	Lawrence T. Neal : 352,347	**William McKinley** : 433,342			Gideon P. Macklin (Pro) : 22,406; Edward J. Brackin (Pop) : 15,563
1891	James E. Campbell : 365,228	**William McKinley** : 386,739			John Seitz (Peoples) : 23,472; John J. Ashenhurst (Pro) : 20,190
1889	**James E. Campbell** : 379,423	Joseph B. Foraker : 368,551			John B. Helwig (Pro) : 26,504; John H. Rhodes (Union-Labor) : 1,048
1887	Thomas E. Powell : 333,205	**Joseph B. Foraker** : 356,534			Morris Sharp (Pro) : 29,700; John Seitz (Union-Labor) : 24,711
1885	George Hoadly : 341,830	**Joseph B. Foraker** : 359,281			Adna B. Leonard (Pro) : 28,081; John W. Northrop (Greenback) : 2,001
1883	**George Hoadly** 359,693	Joseph B. Foraker : 347,164			Ferdinand Schumacher (Pro) : 8,362; Charles Jenkins (Greenback) : 2,937
1881	John W. Bookwalter : 288,426	**Charles Foster** : 312,735			Abraham R. Ludlow (Pro) : 16,597; John Seitz (Greenback) : 6,380
1879	Thomas Ewing, Jr. : 319,132	**Charles Foster** : 336,261			A. Sanders Piatt (Greenback) : 9,072; Gideon T. Stewart (Pro) : 4,145; John Hood (Socialist) : 547
1877	**Richard M. Bishop** : 271,625	William H. West : 249,105			Stephen Johnson (National) : 16,912; Lewis H. Bond (Workingman) : 12,489; Henry A. Thompson (Pro) : 4,836
1875	William Allen : 292,273	**Rutherford B. Hayes** : 297,817			Jay Odell (Pro) : 2,593
1873	**William Allen** : 214,654	Edward Follansbee Noyes : 213,837			Gideon T. Stewart (Pro) : 10,278; Isaac C. Collins (Lib. Rep.) : 10,109
1871	George Wythe McCook : 218,105	**Edward Follansbee Noyes** : 238,273			Gideon T. Stewart (Pro) : 4,084
1869	George H. Pendleton : 227,580	**Rutherford B. Hayes** : 235,081			Samuel Scott (Pro) : 679
1867	Allen G. Thurman : 240,622	**Rutherford B. Hayes** : 243,605			
1865	George W. Morgan : 193,797	**Jacob Dolson Cox** : 223,642			Alexander Long (Dem) : 360
1863	Clement Vallandigham : 187,492	**John Brough** : 288,374			
1861	Hugh J. Jewett : 151,794	**David Tod** : 206,997			
1859	Rufus P. Ranney : 171,226	**William Dennison, Jr.** : 184,557			
1857	Henry B. Payne : 159,065	**Salmon P. Chase** : 160,568			Philadelph Van Trump (American) : 10,272
1855	William Medill : 131,019	**Salmon P. Chase** : 146,770			Allen Trimble (American) : 24,276
1853	**William Medill** : 147,663	Samuel Lewis (Free Soil) : 50,346			Nelson Barrere (Whig) : 85,857
1851	**Reuben Wood** : 145,654	Samuel Lewis (Free Soil) : 16,910			Samuel F. Vinton (Whig) : 119,548
1850	**Reuben Wood** : 133,093	Edward Smith (Abolition) : 13747			William Johnston (Whig) : 121,105
1848	John B. Weller : 148,445				**Seabury Ford** (Whig) : 148,756 others : 742
1846	David Tod : 117,954	Samuel Lewis (Abolition) : 7,574			**William Bebb** (Whig) : 119,215
1844	David Tod : 145,022	Leicester King (Abolition) : 8,898			**Mordecai Bartley** (Whig) : 146,333
1842	**Wilson Shannon** : 119,774	Leicester King (Abolition) : 5,134			Thomas Corwin (Whig) : 117,902
1840	Wilson Shannon : 129,312				**Thomas Corwin** (Whig) : 145,442
1838	**Wilson Shannon** : 107,884				Joseph Vance (Whig) : 102,146
1836	Eli Baldwin : 86,158				**Joseph Vance** (Whig) : 92,204
1834	**Robert Lucas** : 70,338				James Findlay (Whig) : 67,414
1832	**Robert Lucas** : 71,251				Darius Lyman (Anti-Masonic) : 63,185
1830	Robert Lucas : 49,543				**Duncan McArthur** (National Republican) : 51,231
1828	**Allen Trimble** : 53,971				John Wilson Campbell : 51,951 others : 122
1826	**Allen Trimble** : 71,475				John Bigger : 4,114; Alexander Campbell : 4,765; Benjamin Tappan : 4,192
1824	**Jeremiah Morrow** : 39,526				Allen Trimble (Dem) : 37,108
1822	**Jeremiah Morrow** : 26,059				Allen Trimble (Fed) : 22,899; William W. Irvin (Dem) : 11,050
1820	**Ethan Allen Brown** : 34,836				Jeremiah Morrow (Dem) : 9,426; William Henry Harrison : 4,348 others : 250
1818	**Ethan Allen Brown** : 30,194				James Dunlap (DR) : 8,075
1816	**Thomas Worthington** 22,931				James Dunlap (DR) : 6,295; Ethan Allen Brown (Fed) : 1,607
1814	**Thomas Worthington** 15,879				Othniel Looker (DR) : 6,171
1812	Thomas Scott : 7,903				**Return J. Meigs, Jr.** (Fed) : 11,859
1810	**Return J. Meigs, Jr.** : 9,924				Thomas Worthington (DR) : 7,731
1808	**Samuel Huntington** : 7,293				Thomas Worthington (DR) : 5,601; Thomas Kirker (DR) : 3,397
1807	Nathaniel Massie (D-R) : 4,757				**Return J. Meigs, Jr.** (Fed) : 6050
1806	**Edward Tiffin** : 4,788				
1803	**Edward Tiffin** : 4,564				
