= 1960 United States presidential election in Ohio =

- November 8, 1960

Nominee	Richard Nixon	John F. Kennedy
Party	Republican	Democratic
Home state	California	Massachusetts
Running mate	Henry Cabot Lodge Jr.	Lyndon B. Johnson
Electoral vote	25	0
Popular vote	2,217,611	1,944,248
Percentage	53.28%	46.72%
County results
Nixon
50–60%
60–70%
70–80%
Kennedy
50–60%
60–70%
President before election
Dwight D. Eisenhower
Republican
Elected President
John F. Kennedy
Democratic

The 1960 United States presidential election in Ohio on November 8, was part of the 1960 United States presidential election. Voters chose 25 representatives, or electors to the Electoral College, who voted for President and Vice President. Ohio was won by Republican Party candidate, incumbent Vice President Richard Nixon of California, with a 53.28% popular vote majority, defeating Democratic Party candidate and Massachusetts Senator John F. Kennedy, who received 46.72% of the vote.

This was the second of two elections in the 20th century in which Ohio, a historical bellwether state, voted for the losing candidate, the first being 1944 when Republican nominee Thomas E. Dewey carried the state over President Franklin D. Roosevelt. It would not do so again until it backed Donald Trump over Joe Biden in 2020, although it backed the loser of the popular vote in 2000 and 2016.

This anomaly was due to strong anti-Catholic voting (amidst an overall nationwide pro-Democratic swing) in the Appalachia-influenced, heavily Baptist southern and western parts of the state. This was also the last time until 2008 when Lawrence County voted for a losing candidate. Ottawa County would not vote for the losing candidate again until 2020. Had Kennedy won the state along with Roosevelt in 1944, Ohio would have had the longest streak of any state voting for the winning candidate up until 2020.

== Primaries ==
=== Democratic primary ===
Governor Michael DiSalle won the state's primary as a favorite son pledged to support Kennedy.

Ohio was one of the largest states to hold a primary, with 64 delegates to the DNC. Its primary, held on May 3, coincided with that of neighboring Indiana.

Kennedy had campaigned in Ohio numerous times in the two years prior to announcing his official candidacy. While his internal polling was positive, it also showed that he could still lose if a strong candidate launched a favorite son campaign against him. His campaign team was particularly worried about Frank Lausche launching such a challenge. In November 1959 their polling showed a race between him and Kennedy resulting in a statistical tie. Those polls showed that Kennedy would win the race a race between him and DiSalle 62 to 38%.

In 1959, during his many visits to the state, Kennedy won the backing of Cuyahoga County Democratic Party leader, Ray T. Miller and Cleveland Mayor, Anthony J. Celebrezze.

Kennedy felt that he could not compete in both Ohio and Wisconsin due to time limitations preventing him from being able to spend adequate time in both states. Kennedy saw Wisconsin as providing him an opportunity to potentially deliver an early and fatal blow to Hubert Humphrey's campaign. Thus, he chose to compete there instead of in Ohio.

Kennedy felt that he needed to secure DiSalle's endorsement ahead of declaring his candidacy in order to demonstrate appeal outside of New England. Thus, in December 1959, Kennedy and DiSalle brokered an agreement in which DiSalle would run as a favorite son committed to Kennedy, and would endorse Kennedy and announce his intention to run as a favorite son to assist his candidacy in a January 6 press announcement, four days after Kennedy's formal announcement of his candidacy.

DiSalle won with a wide margin against Albert S. Porter.

=== Republican primary ===
Nixon carried the state's Republican primary.

== Results ==
1960 United States presidential election in Ohio
Party	Candidate	Running mate	Votes	Percentage	Electoral votes
Republican	Richard Nixon	Henry Cabot Lodge Jr.	2,217,611	53.28%	25
Democratic	John F. Kennedy	Lyndon B. Johnson	1,944,248	46.72%	0
Totals			4,161,859	100.00%	25
Voter turnout (registered voters)					%

=== Results by county ===
County	Richard Nixon Republican		John F. Kennedy Democratic		Margin		Total votes cast
County	#	%	#	%	#	%	Total votes cast
Adams	5,996	60.59%	3,900	39.41%	2,096	21.18%	9,896
Allen	28,007	65.54%	14,725	34.46%	13,282	31.08%	42,732
Ashland	13,112	69.70%	5,700	30.30%	7,412	39.40%	18,812
Ashtabula	22,406	53.91%	19,155	46.09%	3,251	7.82%	41,561
Athens	10,747	58.76%	7,542	41.24%	3,205	17.52%	18,289
Auglaize	11,183	64.03%	6,282	35.97%	4,901	28.06%	17,465
Belmont	18,146	43.26%	23,805	56.74%	-5,659	-13.48%	41,951
Brown	6,461	55.73%	5,133	44.27%	1,328	11.46%	11,594
Butler	46,518	58.66%	32,778	41.34%	13,740	17.32%	79,296
Carroll	6,095	63.60%	3,488	36.40%	2,607	27.20%	9,583
Champaign	9,141	66.72%	4,560	33.28%	4,581	33.44%	13,701
Clark	30,588	57.67%	22,456	42.33%	8,132	15.34%	53,044
Clermont	18,802	61.60%	11,723	38.40%	7,079	23.20%	30,525
Clinton	8,464	65.30%	4,498	34.70%	3,966	30.60%	12,962
Columbiana	28,414	58.64%	20,037	41.36%	8,377	17.28%	48,451
Coshocton	9,913	64.75%	5,396	35.25%	4,517	29.50%	15,309
Crawford	14,558	67.59%	6,981	32.41%	7,577	35.18%	21,539
Cuyahoga	288,056	40.17%	429,030	59.83%	-140,974	-19.66%	717,086
Darke	14,048	64.55%	7,715	35.45%	6,333	29.10%	21,763
Defiance	8,912	63.12%	5,207	36.88%	3,705	26.24%	14,119
Delaware	11,391	68.11%	5,334	31.89%	6,057	36.22%	16,725
Erie	15,092	57.94%	10,954	42.06%	4,138	15.88%	26,046
Fairfield	17,743	66.03%	9,128	33.97%	8,615	32.06%	26,871
Fayette	7,085	64.11%	3,966	35.89%	3,119	28.22%	11,051
Franklin	161,178	59.37%	110,283	40.63%	50,895	18.74%	271,461
Fulton	9,695	74.76%	3,274	25.24%	6,421	49.52%	12,969
Gallia	7,602	68.49%	3,498	31.51%	4,104	36.98%	11,100
Geauga	12,491	59.44%	8,522	40.56%	3,969	18.88%	21,013
Greene	19,642	58.12%	14,155	41.88%	5,487	16.24%	33,797
Guernsey	10,396	61.41%	6,532	38.59%	3,864	22.82%	16,928
Hamilton	211,068	54.50%	176,215	45.50%	34,853	9.00%	387,283
Hancock	17,059	71.76%	6,712	28.24%	10,347	43.52%	23,771
Hardin	9,042	64.41%	4,996	35.59%	4,046	28.82%	14,038
Harrison	5,191	58.77%	3,641	41.23%	1,550	17.54%	8,832
Henry	8,251	70.73%	3,415	29.27%	4,836	41.46%	11,666
Highland	8,948	62.26%	5,423	37.74%	3,525	24.52%	14,371
Hocking	5,262	56.47%	4,057	43.53%	1,205	12.94%	9,319
Holmes	4,432	69.41%	1,953	30.59%	2,479	38.82%	6,385
Huron	12,261	61.94%	7,534	38.06%	4,727	23.88%	19,795
Jackson	7,973	58.96%	5,549	41.04%	2,424	17.92%	13,522
Jefferson	21,186	44.01%	26,955	55.99%	-5,769	-11.98%	48,141
Knox	12,711	65.94%	6,565	34.06%	6,146	31.88%	19,276
Lake	32,038	48.94%	33,425	51.06%	-1,387	-2.12%	65,463
Lawrence	13,159	60.32%	8,656	39.68%	4,503	20.64%	21,815
Licking	23,653	63.95%	13,335	36.05%	10,318	27.90%	36,988
Logan	11,311	68.18%	5,279	31.82%	6,032	36.36%	16,590
Lorain	39,361	47.51%	43,487	52.49%	-4,126	-4.98%	82,848
Lucas	94,679	47.94%	102,825	52.06%	-8,146	-4.12%	197,504
Madison	7,256	66.37%	3,677	33.63%	3,579	32.74%	10,933
Mahoning	51,927	38.73%	82,143	61.27%	-30,216	-22.54%	134,070
Marion	15,210	61.31%	9,598	38.69%	5,612	22.62%	24,808
Medina	16,123	62.21%	9,796	37.79%	6,327	24.42%	25,919
Meigs	6,976	66.77%	3,472	33.23%	3,504	33.54%	10,448
Mercer	7,735	50.02%	7,730	49.98%	5	0.04%	15,465
Miami	22,151	65.30%	11,770	34.70%	10,381	30.60%	33,921
Monroe	4,106	56.63%	3,144	43.37%	962	13.26%	7,250
Montgomery	109,602	52.71%	98,325	47.29%	11,277	5.42%	207,927
Morgan	4,424	70.82%	1,823	29.18%	2,601	41.64%	6,247
Morrow	6,357	69.91%	2,736	30.09%	3,621	39.82%	9,093
Muskingum	21,518	61.88%	13,254	38.12%	8,264	23.76%	34,772
Noble	3,951	65.99%	2,036	34.01%	1,915	31.98%	5,987
Ottawa	9,260	58.34%	6,612	41.66%	2,648	16.68%	15,872
Paulding	4,961	63.72%	2,825	36.28%	2,136	27.44%	7,786
Perry	7,658	59.60%	5,191	40.40%	2,467	19.20%	12,849
Pickaway	7,821	61.63%	4,870	38.37%	2,951	23.26%	12,691
Pike	3,684	45.92%	4,339	54.08%	-655	-8.16%	8,023
Portage	19,634	51.45%	18,528	48.55%	1,106	2.90%	38,162
Preble	8,802	61.69%	5,467	38.31%	3,335	23.38%	14,269
Putnam	6,834	53.09%	6,039	46.91%	795	6.18%	12,873
Richland	27,317	58.17%	19,645	41.83%	7,672	16.34%	46,962
Ross	14,075	60.90%	9,036	39.10%	5,039	21.80%	23,111
Sandusky	14,566	64.06%	8,171	35.94%	6,395	28.12%	22,737
Scioto	21,771	56.67%	16,647	43.33%	5,124	13.34%	38,418
Seneca	15,772	61.20%	10,001	38.80%	5,771	22.40%	25,773
Shelby	8,766	56.08%	6,866	43.92%	1,900	12.16%	15,632
Stark	82,881	55.22%	67,205	44.78%	15,676	10.44%	150,086
Summit	109,066	49.59%	110,852	50.41%	-1,786	-0.82%	219,918
Trumbull	40,724	46.46%	46,928	53.54%	-6,204	-7.08%	87,652
Tuscarawas	20,637	56.20%	16,083	43.80%	4,554	12.40%	36,720
Union	7,838	71.55%	3,116	28.45%	4,722	43.10%	10,954
Van Wert	9,666	65.68%	5,050	34.32%	4,616	31.36%	14,716
Vinton	3,043	59.97%	2,031	40.03%	1,012	19.94%	5,074
Warren	14,505	64.61%	7,945	35.39%	6,560	29.22%	22,450
Washington	14,197	64.38%	7,856	35.62%	6,341	28.76%	22,053
Wayne	21,273	69.10%	9,511	30.90%	11,762	38.20%	30,784
Williams	10,319	71.84%	4,044	28.16%	6,275	43.68%	14,363
Wood	18,952	64.17%	10,581	35.83%	8,371	28.34%	29,533
Wyandot	6,786	65.81%	3,526	34.19%	3,260	31.62%	10,312
Totals	2,217,611	53.28%	1,944,248	46.72%	273,363	6.56%	4,161,859

==== Counties that flipped from Republican to Democratic ====
- Belmont
- Cuyahoga
- Jefferson
- Lorain
- Mahoning
- Lucas
- Lake
- Summit
- Trumbull

== See also ==
- United States presidential elections in Ohio
