= Roger Putnam =

American politician and businessman

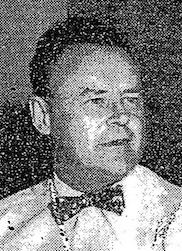
- Putnam in 1952
- Born: Roger Lowell Putnam; December 19, 1893; Boston, Massachusetts, U.S.
- Died: November 24, 1972 (aged 78); Springfield, Massachusetts, U.S.
- Education: Noble and Greenough School in Boston; Harvard University (1915 degree in math)
- Occupations: American politician and businessman; Mayor of Springfield, Massachusetts, from 1937 until 1943; Director of the Economic Stabilization Administration from 1951 until 1952
- Known for: Sole trustee of the Lowell Observatory for 40 years
- Board member of: Massachusetts Board of Regional Community Colleges (1958); Massachusetts Board of Higher Education (1966)
- Spouse: Caroline Jenkins
- Children: Caroline, Roger Jr., William, Anna, Mary, and Michael
- Parent: William Lowell Putnam II
- Awards: Honorary degrees from Boston College (1949), Saint Anselm College (1952), and the University of Massachusetts Lowell (1970)

Roger Lowell Putnam (December 19, 1893 – November 24, 1972) was an American politician and businessman. A member of the prominent Lowell family of Boston, he served as mayor of Springfield, Massachusetts, from 1937 until 1943, and as director of the Economic Stabilization Administration from 1951 until 1952. During his short tenure in federal office, the nation's steelworkers struck, leading United States President Harry S. Truman to seize the nation's steel mills.

For 40 years, Putnam was also the sole trustee of the Lowell Observatory. During that time, he purchased three new telescopes for the observatory and was instrumental in pushing Lowell astronomers to search for Percival Lowell's theoretical "Planet X", which led to the discovery of Pluto in 1930.

== Early life and education ==
Roger Lowell Putnam was born on December 19, 1893, in Boston. He was the son of William Lowell Putnam II, a notable and wealthy Boston lawyer. The Putnams were members of the Boston Brahmins, a group of families which claimed descent from the founders of Boston. On his mother's side, Percival Lowell (the noted astronomer) and Abbott Lawrence Lowell (president of Harvard University from 1909 to 1933) were his uncles and the cigar-smoking poet Amy Lowell was his aunt.

Putnam graduated from the Noble and Greenough School in Boston, and then attended Harvard University. He became acquainted with Leverett Saltonstall while at Harvard, joined the Hasty Pudding Club and the Fly Club, and graduated magna cum laude with a degree in mathematics in 1915.

He entered the Massachusetts Institute of Technology in 1916 and undertook graduate studies in mechanical engineering. After the United States entered World War I in 1917, he enlisted in the U.S. Navy. He served on the USS Mississippi and was promoted to lieutenant, junior grade.

After leaving military service, Putnam married the former Caroline Jenkins on October 9, 1919. The couple had six children: Caroline, Roger Jr., William, Anna, Mary, and Michael.

Putnam took a job working for a New London, Connecticut, shipbuilding company. He left that position after a short time to become a salesman for the Package Machinery Co. of West Springfield. He rose quickly within the company's ranks, becoming president in just eight years. During the Great Depression, Putnam used his personal wealth to develop new machinery, keeping employment high. He also instituted profit sharing, gave his employees life insurance and instituted a bonus plan. He was named chairman of the board at Package Machinery in 1942, where he remained until 1948.

== Role in discovering Pluto ==
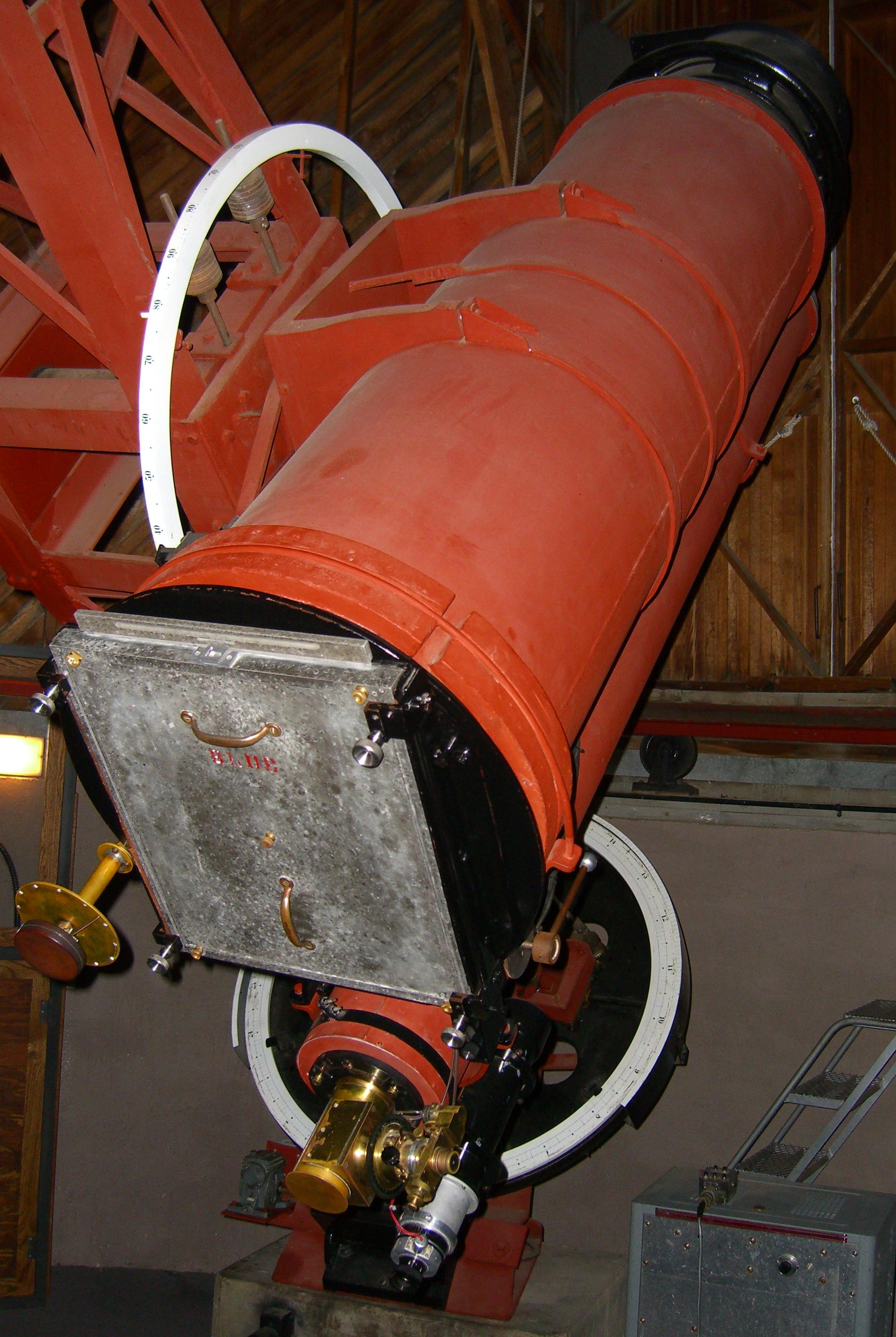
The 13-inch (330 mm), f/5.3 astrograph at Lowell Observatory, built at the insistence of Putnam and used in the discovery of Pluto

Through his uncle, Percival Lowell, and his own father, Putnam gained a love of astronomy and was an amateur astronomer for most of his life.

Percival Lowell died in 1916. He named Harcourt Amory (his cousin, college roommate and best friend) and his wife, Constance Lowell, executors of his estate. Although Constance Lowell received a $150,000 lump-sum payment, a generous yearly income, and her husband's personal property (including their opulent Boston home), the Lowell Observatory received the bulk of Lowell's money. Amory, meanwhile, was also named the sole trustee of the Lowell Observatory. Constance Lowell felt the will was unfair and went to court to break it. After convincing Amory to resign as trustee, Constance Lowell also induced George Putnam (Roger's older brother) to decline the position. Constance Lowell then named Guy Lowell, Percival Lowell's third cousin, as trustee, believing she could dominate him. However, Guy Lowell fought Constance's attempt to break the will. The lawsuit was settled in Guy Lowell's favor in 1925, but not before the estate had spent more than half its $2.3 million trust fund.

The lawsuit left the observatory with few funds for research or for the purchase of new equipment. Guy Lowell died in 1927, and the trusteeship of Lowell Observatory passed to Roger Putnam.

Percival Lowell had predicted the existence of a "Planet X"—a possible ninth planet—in 1905, but his subsequent death in 1916 and Constance Lowell's lawsuit had largely mothballed the search for the celestial body. Putnam, however, was determined to find "Planet X." Spending several months a year at the Lowell Observatory, Putnam resolved to build a new 13-inch (330 mm) refracting telescope and astrograph at the Observatory to revive the search. The reluctant staff hesitated to spend the Observatory's limited funds on the new telescope until Putnam forced the issue. To fund construction, Putnam persuaded his uncle, Abbott Lawrence Lowell, to provide $10,000 for the new telescope. To save money, Putnam ordered the mounting to be built on-site in the observatory workshop rather than by a contractor. Observatory Director V. M. Slipher designed the telescope. When one of the lens components was ground too thin, a new component had to be built. Putnam paid the $6,000 replacement cost out of his own funds.

The new 13-inch (330 mm) telescope was used by Clyde Tombaugh in the search for "Planet X." On February 18, 1930, Tombaugh discovered a new planet, which was named Pluto on May 1.

Putnam's political and business interests lessened the amount of time he could devote to the Lowell Observatory in the 1930s and 1940s. The Observatory's three senior astronomers—V. M. Slipher, E. C. Slipher and C. O. Lampland—were no longer doing much research or publishing and prevented other, younger astronomers from using the telescopes. Lampland died on December 14, 1951, and Putnam decided to use the occasion to bring in some new blood. Putnam hired Albert Wilson, a Caltech astronomer who had led the Palomar Sky Survey. Although Wilson clashed with Observatory personnel and resigned after only two years on the job, with Putnam's support he greatly modernized the Observatory's procedures, policies, and equipment. Most importantly, he instituted a mandatory retirement age of 70 and resilvered the Observatory's 42-inch (1,100 mm) Ritchey–Chrétien telescope (now named the John Hall Telescope). When Wilson came under attack for laying off photoelectric research staff, Putnam publicly reaffirmed his confidence in him.

As Putnam searched for a new director, he almost put the Lowell Observatory under the control of Harvard University. Donald Menzel, director of the Harvard Observatory, offered to move Harvard's 61-inch (1.5 m) telescope to the Lowell Observatory in exchange for naming the next director. Putnam was initially receptive to the idea, but after consulting with several young astronomers (most notably Harold Johnson), Putnam decided against a collaboration with Harvard.

Determined to continue the modernization program begun by Wilson, Putnam hired astronomer John Scoville Hall as director in 1958. Hall took advantage of the launch of Sputnik 1 in October 1957 and the ensuing Sputnik crisis in the United States to seek greatly increased federal funding for the Observatory. Putnam used his extensive political connections to help Hall land lucrative federal contracts, which significantly improved the Observatory's finances. Hall also hired energetic, bright young astronomers and rebuilt the Observatory's reputation as a research institution.

In 1961, Putnam managed to make an indirect contribution to the study of Mars. E. C. Slipher had taken an enormous number of photographs of Mars, but most of them remained unseen by others. Determined to restore the Observatory's prestige, Putnam badgered Slipher into making these images available. In 1962, Slipher's monumental work, A Photographic History of Mars (1905–1961), was published, marking a major advance in the planetary science of Mars.

Putnam also played a major role in securing a new 42-inch (1,100 mm) telescope for the Observatory in 1961. Ohio Wesleyan University's Perkins Observatory in Delaware, Ohio, had a 42-inch (1,100 mm) cassegrain reflector telescope which was under-utilized due to poor viewing conditions and low elevation. Putnam led the negotiations which permanently moved the 42-inch (1,100 mm) telescope to Lowell Observatory's Anderson Mesa site (in Arizona). The telescope was operated by Lowell Observatory in partnership with the Ohio State University and Ohio Wesleyan, and purchased by Lowell in 1998.

Putnam brought Perkins's 69-inch (1.8 m) telescope to the Arizona observatory as well. The Observatory's existing 69-inch (1.8 m) telescope had cracked in 1964 while staff attempted to update its optical system. The Perkins mirror did not stay at Lowell for long, returning to Perkins' control in 1969. The Lowell Observatory retained the mount, however. Hall won Putnam's approval to rebuild the mount as a 72-inch (1.8 m) telescope, and a new, improved Zerodur mirror built and installed (it is still called the "Perkins telescope", however).

One of Putnam's last major contributions as trustee was the establishment of the Lowell Observatory's Planetary Research Center. In 1961, Putnam convinced NASA officials to fund a major planetary research initiative at the Lowell Observatory. In 1965, NASA agreed to build the Planetary Research Center at Lowell to house the rapidly growing project.

Roger Putnam retired as trustee of the Lowell Observatory in 1967. His youngest son, the classicist Dr. Michael C. J. Putnam, succeeded him.

== Political career ==
A Republican early in life, Putnam voted for Franklin D. Roosevelt in 1932. He switched parties and remained a Democrat for the rest of his life.

Putnam became increasingly active in politics through his business ventures. In 1933, he sat on a commission which helped draft Massachusetts' first unemployment compensation act, which Governor Joseph B. Ely signed into law in 1934. Putnam was elected mayor of Springfield three times—in 1937, 1939, and 1941. He was the Democratic nominee for governor of Massachusetts in 1942, but lost to Republican Leverett Saltonstall 54% to 45%. In 1946 he ran for lieutenant governor, but lost the Democratic nomination to Paul A. Dever.

== Federal service ==
President Franklin Roosevelt appointed Putnam as deputy director of the Office of Contract Settlement of 1944. Established by the Contract Settlement Act (58 Stat. 651; July 1, 1944) and part of the Office of War Mobilization, Putnam helped settle claims arising from terminated war contracts during World War II. Putnam served in that capacity until the office was abolished by executive order 9809 on December 12, 1946.

In 1951, President Harry Truman appointed Putnam administrator of the Economic Stabilization Agency (ESA). After the outbreak of the Korean War, the U.S. Congress enacted the Defense Production Act. Title IV of the Act gave the president the authority to impose wage and price controls in progressive steps. The ESA was established on September 9, 1950, when Truman issued Executive Order 10161, which established the ESA and charged it with coordinating and supervising wage and price controls. After Congress amended the Defense Production Act in July 1951 to permit looser price controls, ESA Administrator Eric Johnston quit in frustration six weeks later. Putnam was named his replacement in November after Truman's first choices for the office refused to take the job.

=== The steel seizure crisis ===
Putnam faced an immediate crisis as head of the ESA. The collective bargaining agreement between the United Steelworkers of America and the nation's major steel manufacturers was to expire on December 31, 1951. Yet few negotiations had taken place. Steelmakers refused to grant any wage increase without a guarantee that the Office of Price Stability (OPS), a subdivision of the ESA, would grant a price increase to match. The union, however, was pushing the Wage Stabilization Board (WSB), another ESA agency, to grant the workers a significantly higher wage. President Truman and Putnam were convinced that the key to taming inflation was to break the price/wage spiral in which higher wages pushed prices higher, only to induce workers to seek even higher wages to overcome the inflation in prices.

Putnam worked feverishly for six weeks to settle the steel talks. He ordered his subordinates at OPS and WSB to meet with the union and manufacturers and to call meetings of both sides. He also coordinated settlement efforts with Cyrus S. Ching, director of the Federal Mediation and Conciliation Service, but the talks failed. Putnam then urged President Truman to personally intervene in the steel crisis and use his influence with union leaders, which he did on New Year's Eve. Philip Murray, president of the Steelworkers, subsequently postponed the strike for 45 days beginning January 3, 1952.

The steel crisis issue was now out of Putnam's hands. In Executive Order 10233, President Truman had expanded the WSB's powers in April 1951. To ease the threat of strikes and make the board's wage stabilization efforts easier, the board was now authorized to make recommendations on economic and non-economic issues in collective bargaining disputes, a power it had previously lacked. The board could not, however, force parties in a labor dispute to accept its findings. When making recommendations, the board was authorized to report only to the president, bypassing Putnam and his superior, Charles Edward Wilson, administrator of the Office of Defense Mobilization (of which ESA was a part). As one incentive to get the union to postpone the strike, Truman agreed to let the WSB investigate the labor dispute and invoke the direct presidential reporting provisions of E.O. 10233.

While the Wage Stabilization Board conducted its hearings, Putnam was forced to replace the administrator of OPS. Michael DiSalle, the OPS administrator, had announced his resignation in the fall in order to run for the United States Senate. Putnam and Truman agreed to replace DiSalle with Ellis Arnall, a former governor of Georgia.

The issues involved in the steel wage case were so complex that the board extended its deadline for issuing a decision by 30 days. The union also agreed to put off its strike until the board acted. During this time, Putnam met repeatedly with White House staff to keep them abreast of developments at the board and price negotiations between OPS and steel manufacturers.

When the board issued its recommendations on March 20, 1952, it triggered a crisis which led to seizure of the nation's steel mills. The decision to give the workers a 26 cent-an-hour raise (which included bringing their pensions to parity with workers in other industries) was largely seen as an overly-generous award as well as a union victory. Although he had been bypassed by the procedures of E.O. 10233, Wilson decided to intervene in the dispute to avoid having the terms of the recommendation accepted. He met with Putnam and Arnall on March 21 and informed them he would be involved in the steel industry labor dispute personally. Wilson then traveled to Key West, Florida, to meet with a vacationing Truman. Believing he had won Truman's consent to reduce the wage recommendation, Wilson subsequently denounced the WSB recommendation and sponsored a number of collective bargaining sessions between the parties over the next few days. An angry Putnam and his deputies met with Wilson on March 27. Wilson Putnam and his deputies met with the president on March 28, at which time Putnam told Truman that the WSB recommendations met wage stabilization goals and that Wilson's actions were inappropriate. Truman agreed; Wilson resigned. John R. Steelman, Assistant to the President of the United States (a position which later became the White House Chief of Staff), was named interim director of the Office of Defense Mobilization on March 30. Negotiations between Steelman's staff, employers and the union unraveled over the next seven days, and the union announced it would strike on April 9. In a nationally televised address at 10:30 p.m. Eastern time on April 8, President Truman announced that he was seizing the nation's steel mills under his authority as commander-in-chief. The steelmakers sued to regain control of their property.

As the case wound its way through the courts, Putnam attempted to restart negotiations and avoid a strike. On April 23, he personally ordered a $3-per-ton increase in the price of steel. Although the award was higher than the $2.75-per-ton price increase permitted by law, it was lower than the $4.50-per-ton increase last offered to the steelmakers by Arnall 10 days earlier and far lower than the $12-per-ton increase the steelmakers were publicly claiming was needed to make up for the WSB's wage recommendation.

An angry Congress began investigating the Truman administration's wage and price stabilization program. Putnam engaged in a public war of words with Wilson after Wilson testified that authority to hear labor disputes should be taken away from ESA, WSB and other stabilization agencies.

On June 2, 1952, the U.S. Supreme Court ruled in Youngstown Sheet & Tube Co. v. Sawyer, 343 U.S. 579 (1952) that the president lacked the authority as commander-in-chief to seize the steel mills. The union struck the next day. The strike lasted 53 days. Although Putnam was involved in presidential efforts to resolve the dispute, Truman's personal aides were primarily responsible for intervening in the strike. The steelmakers and the union reached a tentative agreement on July 24, 1952, after Truman threatened to use his powers under the Selective Training and Service Act of 1940 to draft the steelworkers and turn the steel mills into military installations. After just a few hours of negotiations, the parties settled on essentially the same terms offered by the WSB four months earlier.

Putnam was outraged by the steel manufacturers' behavior during the steel crisis. He felt the steelmakers had held "a loaded gun poised at the Government's head" and that the employers' publicly stated reasons for forcing the union on strike were "hollow" and pretentious.

Some day, I hope we shall know the real motives behind the mysterious conduct of the steel industry in this tragic incident. Some day, perhaps we will know why this strike was dragged out for 53 days only to be settled on substantially the same wage and price terms which the companies could have had nearly four months ago.

=== Remaining tenure at ESA ===
The steelworkers' strike made Putnam work much harder to maintain the Truman administration's wage and price stabilization program. Putnam was forced to give aluminum workers a 21.4 cents an hour wage increase just days later in order to avoid a strike. But he later imposed new wage restrictions on nine large classes of small businesses and strict limitations on the kind of Christmas gifts employers could give to workers in order to avoid a spike in inflation.

Congress stripped the WSB of its labor dispute adjudication powers in the wake of the steel seizure crisis. Putnam struggled to keep union representatives on the new board, and to find industry representatives willing to serve. He succeeded in fully staffing the board, but the wage stabilization program continued to disintegrate.

A revolving door at the top of the ESA and its key agencies worsened the situation. Nathan Feinsinger, the chairman of the WSB, resigned in July 1952. Putnam appointed Archibald Cox as his replacement in August. Ellis Arnall resigned in early August, and Putnam appointed Tighe Woods, chairman of the federal rent stabilization agency, as his successor.

A second labor wage dispute crisis hit in October 1952. Bituminous coal miners organized by the United Mine Workers of America had negotiated a wage increase of $1.90 per hour but no increase in fringe benefits (as other unions had). Without union knowledge, the coal operators submitted the agreement for approval to the reconstituted Wage Stabilization Board. Mine union president John L. Lewis, angered by the lack of respect, refused to participate in the WSB's hearings despite Cox's pleas for union input. Reluctantly, on October 18 the board cut the wage increase by 40 cents. Angry union coal miners engaged in a nationwide wildcat strike the next day. With the presidential election just weeks away, Lewis asked Putnam to take personal control of the coal miners' case on October 24, and Putnam did so on October 25. The strike ended. Putnam deferred action until after the election. When Lewis balked at further delay, Putnam threatened to rule against the union. Although Putnam, Cox and other stabilization and mobilization officials all eventually endorsed the lower pay award, Truman reversed the WSB on December 3. Cox and industry representatives on the WSB resigned in protest. The decision led to the collapse of the Wage Stabilization Board, and it quickly became clear that neither President Truman nor President-elect Dwight Eisenhower would seek to retain national wage and price controls.

The coal pay dispute and the increasingly untenable position of the administration's wage and price control program led Putnam to resign as ESA administrator on November 6, 1952. Truman named DiSalle his successor until Eisenhower named a permanent replacement or Congress failed to renew the Defense Production Act. During his last months in office, Putnam continually defended the wage and price control program as necessary for the national welfare while conceding that neither Congress nor the next president (whether Truman or Eisenhower) would be likely to retain it.

== Later life ==
After leaving federal service, Putnam returned to his position as chairman of Package Machinery. In 1953, Putnam became president of WWLP, Springfield's first television station. WRLP-TV, WWLP's sister station, took its call letters from Putnam's name. Late in life, Putnam also served on the board of the Third National Bank of Hampden County and the board of the Van Norman Machine Tool Company (now part of the Kwik-Way corporation).

Putnam believed higher education was the key to social uplift and the country's economic problems. Beginning in 1958, he served on the Massachusetts Board of Regional Community Colleges. In 1966, he served on the Massachusetts Board of Higher Education. Putnam also received honorary degrees from Boston College (1949), Saint Anselm College (1952), and the University of Massachusetts Lowell (1970).

== Death ==
Putnam died of a stroke at Mercy Hospital in Springfield, Massachusetts on November 24, 1972, aged 78.

== Legacy ==
- Roger L Putnam Vocational-Technical High School in Springfield, Massachusetts, is named for him.
- Alumni House, the home of the Boston College Alumni Association, was renamed in 1967 in honor of Putnam, a benefactor of the college.

== Notes ==
Political offices
| Preceded by Henry Martens | Mayor of Springfield, Massachusetts; 1938–1943 | Succeeded by J. Albin Anderson, Jr. |
Party political offices
| Preceded by Paul A. Dever | Democratic nominee for Governor of Massachusetts; 1942 | Succeeded by Maurice J. Tobin |
