= Clingan =

Clingan may refer to:

- 33747 Clingan (1999 PK4), a Main-belt Asteroid discovered in 1999
- Clingan Jackson (1907–1997), Democratic politician and newspaperman from Ohio
- Donovan Clingan (born 2004), American basketball player
- George Clingan (1868–1953), soldier and politician in Manitoba, Canada
- Judith Clingan (born 1945), Australian composer, conductor, performer and music educator
- Sammy Clingan (born 1984), Northern Ireland international footballer
- William Clingan (1721–1790), delegate in the Continental Congress for Pennsylvania from 1777 to 1779
