= 1952 United States Senate election in Ohio =

- November 4, 1952
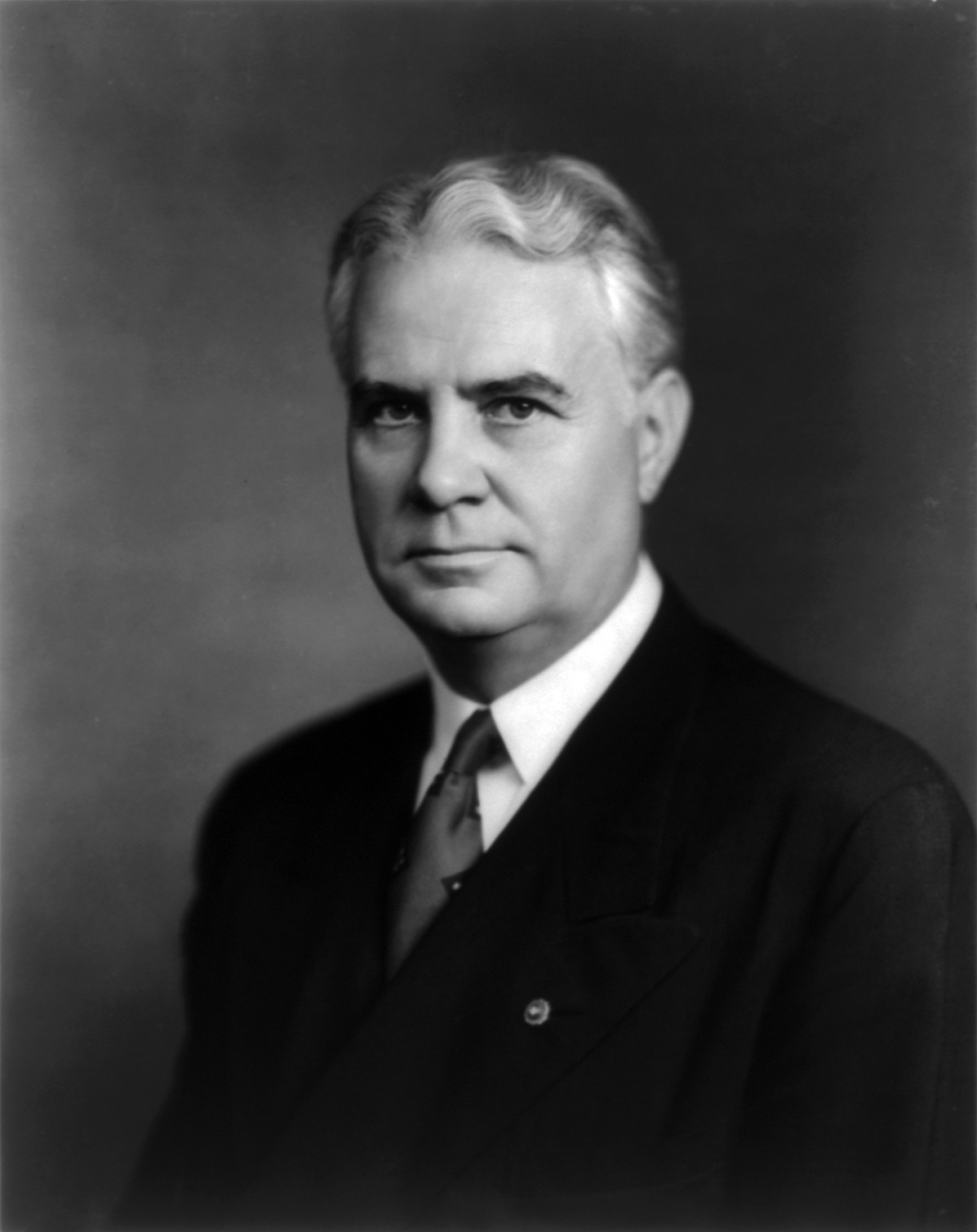

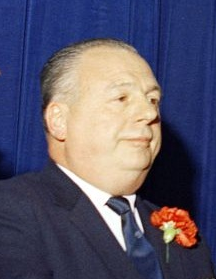
Nominee	John W. Bricker	Michael DiSalle
Party	Republican	Democratic
Popular vote	1,878,971	1,563,330
Percentage	54.59%	45.42%
- County results Bricker: 50–60% 60–70% 70–80% DiSalle: 50–60%
U.S. senator before election
John W. Bricker
Republican
Elected U.S. Senator
John W. Bricker
Republican

The 1952 United States Senate election in Ohio was held on November 4, 1952.

Incumbent Republican Senator John W. Bricker was re-elected to a second term in office over Director of the Economic Stabilization Agency and former Toledo mayor Michael DiSalle.

== Republican primary ==
=== Candidates ===
- John W. Bricker, incumbent Senator since 1947

=== Results ===
1952 Republican Senate primary
Party	Candidate	Votes	%
Republican	John W. Bricker (incumbent)	777,788	100.00%
Total votes		777,788	100.00%

== Democratic primary ==
=== Candidates ===
- James M. Carney, Cleveland millionaire
- Michael DiSalle, Director of the Economic Stabilization Agency and former Mayor of Toledo (1948–1950)
- John W. Donahey, former loan examiner for the Reconstruction Finance Corporation
- George L. Mark, candidate for U.S. House in 1946

=== Results ===
1952 Democratic Senate primary
Party	Candidate	Votes	%
Democratic	Michael DiSalle	229,590	47.01%
Democratic	James M. Carney	117,072	23.97%
Democratic	John W. Donahey	109,592	22.44%
Democratic	George L. Mark	32,089	6.57%
Total votes		488,343	100.00%

== General election ==
=== Results ===
1952 U.S. Senate election in Ohio
Party	Candidate	Votes	%	±%
Republican	John W. Bricker (incumbent)	1,878,971	54.59%	▼2.43
Democratic	Michael DiSalle	1,563,330	45.42%	▲3.06
Total votes		3,442,301	100.00%	N/A
Republican hold				

== See also ==
- 1952 United States Senate elections
