= Mary Metlay Kaufman =

American lawyer

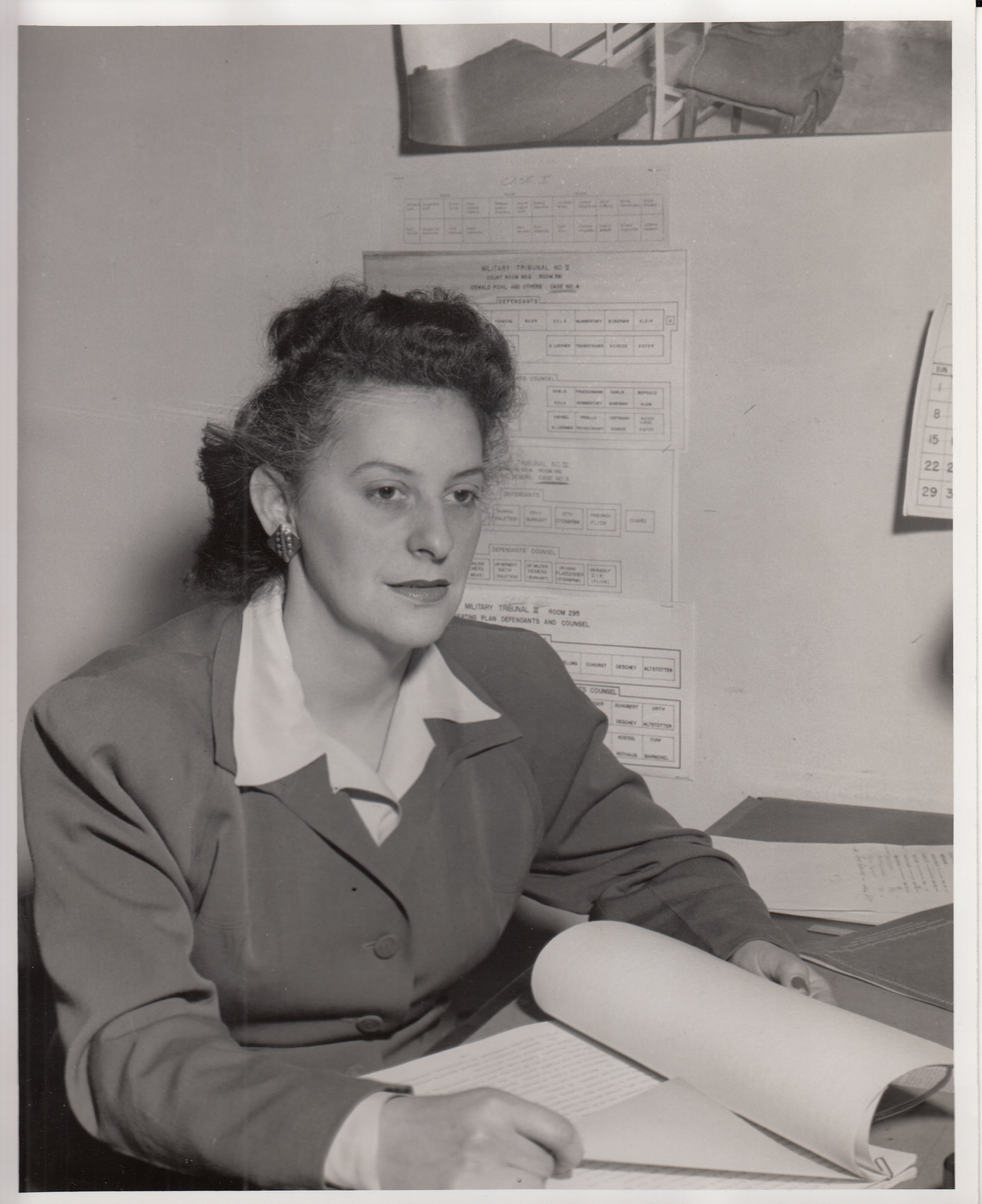
- Born: November 9, 1912; Atlanta, Georgia
- Died: 1995 (aged 82–83); New York City
- Occupation(s): attorney and activist
- Parents: Nathan Metlay (father); Etta Metlay (mother)

Mary Metlay Kaufman (November 9, 1912, in Atlanta, Georgia – 1995 in New York City) was an American attorney and activist.

== Early life ==
Mary Metlay was the daughter of Nathan and Etta (Kirschner) Metlay, who had emigrated from Russia. In 1917, the Metlay family moved to Brooklyn, New York City. Kaufman described her family's influence on her social consciousness and activism:

"From early childhood, I was very much attuned to the problems of the poor. Poverty was my economic level up until the time I finished law school. My mother led a rent strike during the early days...on the East Side, and I also participated in things like that and the monumental hunger marches and organization of the unemployed in the 1930s.... The other thing that influenced me greatly since childhood was the fact that in my family women did not play a secondary role.... So that although I grew up in a society where women were generally oppressed, I didn't have to battle my personal environment."

== Early career and the Works Progress Administration ==
Kaufman attended James Madison High School and earned her bachelor's degree in Political Science from Brooklyn College in 1932. For the next four years she studied for her law degree, attending night classes at St. John's University Law School while working for the Remedial Reading Program of the Works Progress Administration (WPA). After being admitted to the New York bar in 1937, she continued her organizing work with WPA legal projects and was involved in the Lawyers' Security League, an organization of lawyers working with the WPA. During this time she also worked for labor lawyer, Frank Scheiner, "representing parties at conferences before the New York State and National Labor Relations Board." She was one of the original members of the progressive National Lawyers' Guild, founded in 1937, and was active on both the national level and in the New York City Chapter into the 1970s.

== National Labor Relations Board ==
In 1940, Kaufman moved to Washington, D.C. to work for the National Labor Relations Board as a Review Attorney, analyzing transcripts of hearings, reporting findings to the Board, and writing decisions. That same year she married Frederick Kaufman and a year later returned to New York to raise their son Michael, born September 1941. In 1944 Kaufman moved back to Washington with her son to work for the National War Labor Board, and then the National Wage Stabilization Board until 1947. She and her husband were separated in 1946 and eventually divorced in 1952.

== US Military Tribunal in Nuremberg, Germany ==
From 1947 to 1948, Kaufman served on the prosecution team of the U.S. Military Tribunal in Nuremberg, Germany, in the case against the international chemical cartel, I.G. Farben (United States v. Krauch). I.G. Farben was a financial supporter of the Nazi regime, and was charged with pillaging the chemical industries of occupied Europe; using slave labor; and manufacturing Zyklon B, the gas used in the Nazi death camps. Members of the board of directors were charged with crimes against peace, war crimes, and crimes against humanity – the three categories of war crimes defined at Nuremberg. But Cold War politics meant that there was little support for giving them more than light sentences.

== Cold War and Anti-Vietnam War era ==
Kaufman returned to the US in 1948 in the midst of the domestic Cold War. As she later told an interviewer, it was "an atmosphere I hadn't watched develop and was appalled by it. I had been living in the past of the Nazi's rise to power – a rise which began with the elimination of the Communists and the use of anti-communism as a pretext for suspending the constitutional guarantees of the people – and came back to see what appeared to me to be the same development taking place in this country." Upon her return she established her private practice in New York City and began her life-long work as a defender of civil liberties and constitutional rights. From 1948 into the early 1960s, her legal work consisted primarily of defending leaders of the Communist Party of the United States (C.P.U.S.A.) who were indicted under the Smith Act in New York, Denver, and St. Louis, including Richard Thompson, Claudia Jones, and Elizabeth Gurley Flynn. During this period she also represented individuals before the House Un-American Activities Committee (HUAC) and the Subversive Activities Control Board (SACB).

1966 was a turning point in Kaufman's career:

"At that time I decided to take stock and consider where to go next. I was terribly troubled by the racism in our society and the war in Vietnam. I spent a long time researching and reviewing the Nuremberg war crimes trials. I was overwhelmed by the similarity of the patterns of the Nazis with our own.... I wrote on the subject. I then traveled to Europe, the Soviet Union, Czechoslovakia, and the German Democratic Republic to lecture and to study their legal systems.... When I came back the protests against war, racism and poverty were in full bloom."

In December 1967, during "Stop the Draft week" hundreds of war protestors were arrested in New York City. The National Lawyers' Guild set up the Mass Defense Committee, chaired by Kaufman, to defend them. It was the first time the Guild was to undertake direct representation of people arrested in political actions. In April 1968, when over a thousand people were arrested during the Columbia University strike, parents of students arrested helped to raise enough money to set up the Mass Defense Office. Kaufman directed the office from 1968 to 1971, supervising over 200 volunteer lawyers, law students, activists, and legal workers, and directing the defense of thousands arrested protesting for civil rights and peace.

== Later life and career ==
Kaufman's development of the theory of the use of the Nuremberg principles, particularly the principle of individual responsibility, was a guiding force in her defense of political activists. Over the next two decades she researched, spoke, and wrote on the subject of defending civil disobedience in the face of U.S. war crimes against peace and humanity. Kaufman was a legal advisor in the "Hickam 3" case of anti-Vietnam War protestors in Hawaii in 1972. From 1977 to 1983, she testified in a series of civil disobedience cases in defense of protestors of the Trident nuclear submarine based in Bangor, Washington, and she participated in several international tribunals from 1967 to 1984, investigating U.S. involvement in Southeast Asia; the use of atomic weapons against Japan; and the nuclear arms race.

In 1972, Kaufman was hired as a visiting professor to direct the Undergraduate Legal Studies Program at Antioch College in Yellow Springs, Ohio. She taught courses in McCarthyism; labor law; Nuremberg and international law; racism and the law; and political trials of the 20th Century. After leaving Antioch, Kaufman was hired as a Visiting Professor of Law at Hampshire College in Amherst, Massachusetts, from 1975 to 1976 and she delivered the Commencement Address there in 1976.

Kaufman retired from legal casework by 1980, but continued to speak and write on issues such as peace and nuclear disarmament, civil rights, and political freedom. She died in New York City in 1995.

"Mary Kaufman donated her papers to the Sophia Smith Collection at Smith College in 1995. Additional papers were given by her son, Michael Kaufman, after her death. The bulk of the papers date from 1946 to 1986 and focus on Kaufman's professional life."

== Writings ==
- Kaufman, M.M., 1968. The Individual's Duty under the Law of Nurnberg: The Effect of Knowledge on Justiciability. Guild Prac., 27, p.15.
- Kaufman, M.M., 1966. Judgment at Nurnberg-An Appraisal of Its Significance on Its Twentieth Anniversary. Guild Prac., 25, p.66.
- Kaufman, M.M., 1983. Statements, Declarations, and Agreements Leading to the War Crimes Trials at Nurnberg, Germany, and Relevant Documents. Guild Prac., 40, p.84.
