= Michael DiSalle =

60th Governor of Ohio

Michael V. DiSalle
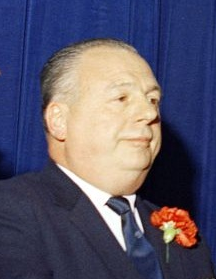
- DiSalle in 1962

60th Governor of Ohio
- In office January 12, 1959 – January 14, 1963
- Lieutenant: John W. Donahey
- Preceded by: C. William O'Neill
- Succeeded by: Jim Rhodes

Director of the Economic Stabilization Agency
- In office December 22, 1952 – January 20, 1953
- President: Harry S. Truman
- Preceded by: Roger Putnam
- Succeeded by: Agency abolished

Director of the Office of Price Stabilization
- In office December 1950 – January 23, 1952
- President: Harry S. Truman
- Preceded by: Office established
- Succeeded by: Alan Valentine

46th Mayor of Toledo
- In office January 1948 – November 30, 1950
- Preceded by: Lloyd Emerson Roulet
- Succeeded by: Ollie Czelusta

Member of the Toledo City Council
- In office 1942–1950

Member of the Ohio House of Representatives
- In office 1937–1939

Personal details
- Born: Michael Vincent DiSalle; January 6, 1908 New York City, U.S.
- Died: September 16, 1981 (aged 73) Pescara, Abruzzo, Italy
- Party: Democratic
- Spouse: Myrtle Eugene England (m. 1929)
- Education: Georgetown University (LL.B.)
- Profession: Lawyer

Michael Vincent DiSalle (January 6, 1908 – September 16, 1981) was an American politician and attorney who served as the 60th governor of Ohio from 1959 to 1963. A member of the Democratic Party, he previously served as the 46th mayor of Toledo from 1948 to 1950, and as a member of the Toledo City Council and Ohio House of Representatives.

== Early life and education ==
DiSalle was born on January 6, 1908, in New York City, to Italian American immigrant parents, Anthony and Assunta DiSalle. His family moved to Toledo, Ohio, when he was three years old. He graduated with a Bachelor of Laws from Georgetown University in 1931 and was admitted to the Ohio bar in 1932. He married Myrtle E. England; the couple had four daughters and one son. In 1949, the University of Notre Dame conferred DiSalle an honorary Doctor of Law.

== Political career ==
In 1936, DiSalle was elected to the Ohio House of Representatives; he served one term and lost an election for the Ohio Senate in 1938. Following the loss, DiSalle held a series of offices in the city government of Toledo, Ohio. He worked as an assistant law director from 1939 to 1941 before being elected to the Toledo City Council in 1941; the council selected him as vice-mayor in 1943 and 1945.

In 1946, DiSalle ran in the U.S. House of Representatives election in the Toledo-based 9th district, but narrowly lost to the Republican incumbent, Homer A. Ramey. DiSalle was elected as mayor of Toledo in 1947 and re-elected in 1949, and served from 1948 until his resignation on November 30, 1950, to accept a federal appointment. During his mayoralty, Toledo fully re-paid its debts.

In 1950, he ran unsuccessfully for the Democratic nomination for the United States Senate. He lost to then-state auditor Joseph T. Ferguson, who in turn lost the general election to the Republican incumbent, Robert A. Taft. In December 1950, President Harry S. Truman appointed DiSalle as director of the Office of Price Stabilization, a sub-agency of the Korean War-era Economic Stabilization Agency which established and enforced war-time price controls.

DiSalle resigned as director on January 23, 1952, in order to run again for U.S. Senate. He won the Democratic nomination but lost the general election to the Republican incumbent, John W. Bricker. In December 1952, President Truman (now a lame duck) appointed DiSalle as director of the Economic Stabilization Agency, replacing Roger Putnam. The appointment lasted less than one month, and President Dwight D. Eisenhower abolished the agency on April 30, 1953.

=== Governor of Ohio (1959–1963) ===
In 1956, DiSalle was the Democratic nominee for governor of Ohio, losing to then-state attorney general C. William O'Neill. In their 1958 re-match, DiSalle defeated O'Neill. The gubernatorial term had in 1954 been lengthened from two years to four years, starting with the 1958 election, so DiSalle served as governor from 1959 to 1963. In July 1959, DiSalle signed a bill designating "with God, all things are possible" as the official motto of Ohio after it passed the unanimously in the Ohio House of Representatives.

DiSalle was a favorite son candidate in the 1960 Democratic Party presidential primaries. He ran only in the Ohio primary, which he won with 60.25% of the vote against Albert S. Porter, who had run against him in the gubernatorial primary in 1958. Of the total popular vote in the primaries, DiSalle placed sixth behind the eventual nominee, Senator John F. Kennedy, as well as Governor Pat Brown, perennial candidate George H. McLain, Senator Hubert Humphrey, and Senator George Smathers.

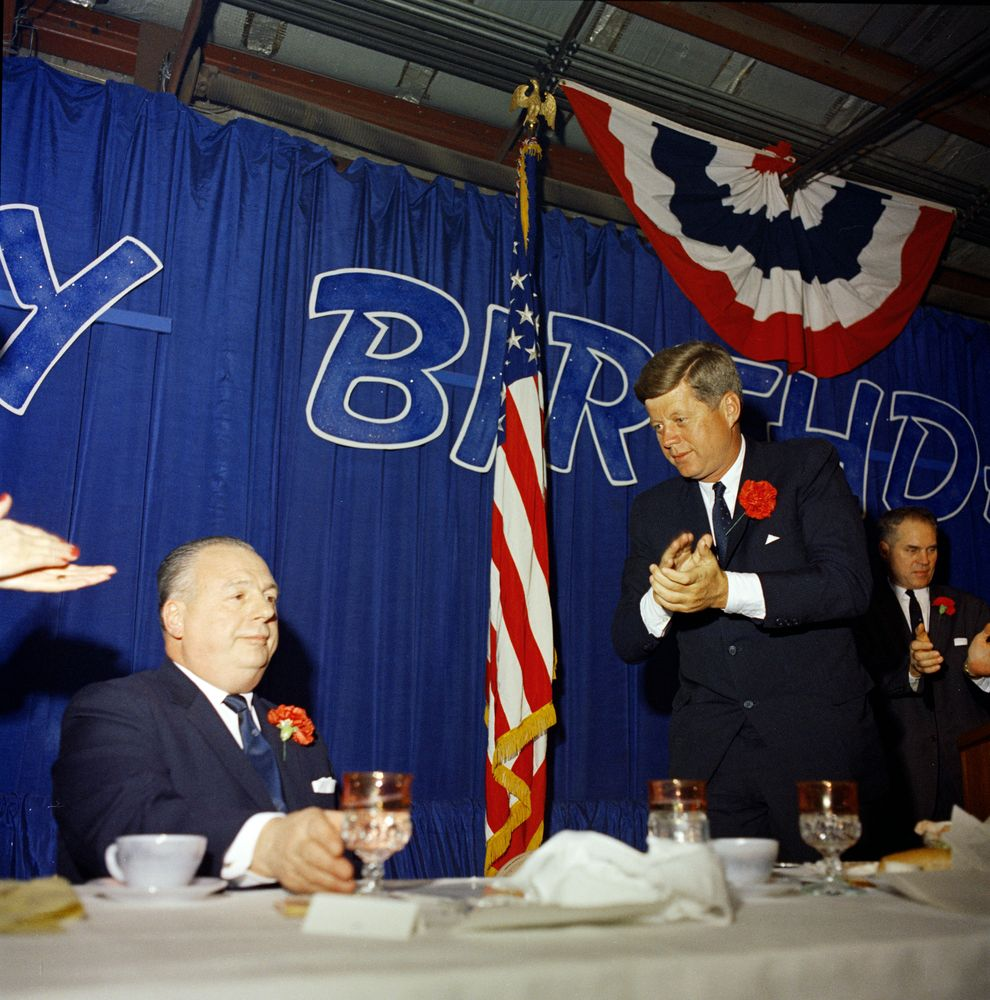
President John F. Kennedy attends DiSalle's birthday party

In 1962, DiSalle lost re-election as governor to then-state auditor Jim Rhodes, after voters disapproved of several aspects of his administration, including his opposition to capital punishment, a tax increase, and a policy which billed wards of state for living necessities.

=== Opposition to capital punishment ===
DiSalle was an opponent of death penalty and commuted a number of sentences as governor. He allowed six of the 12 death sentences he reviewed as governor to proceed. DiSalle stated that despite being "totally opposed to the death penalty", he could not use his power of executive clemency without mitigating circumstances or evidence of miscarriage of justice. To do so would be to personally repeal the law providing for capital punishment in Ohio, and he might have been impeached for violating his oath of office, DiSalle wrote.

DiSalle personally investigated all cases of people scheduled to be executed by electric chair and even personally met with some of them. He agreed with Clinton Duffy, who said that murderers are more likely to be rehabilitated than other criminals. "To demonstrate his faith in rehabilitation, [DiSalle] made it a point to hire convicted murderers to serve on his household staff" at the Ohio Governor's Mansion.

One of DiSalle's primary concerns regarding the death penalty was that poorer defendants did not have the same access to counsel as rich defendants, and therefore would suffer the death penalty disproportionately. He recalled: "I found that the men in death row had one thing in common: they were penniless". They were defended in court by court-appointed attorneys, some without criminal legal experience. Professional criminals "did not have to depend on volunteers", DiSalle wrote. "Nor were they ever, in my experience, executed".

DiSalle believed that penology should be improved. Ronald Fenton, among the 12 cases he reviewed, had raped and murdered a baby. The governor believed that such acts had proved his insanity, but psychiatrists had found him sane. Although he believed that the M'Naghten Rule was flawed, because of the finding—and expecting that had he been commuted to life imprisonment "his prisonmates would have made his life unbearable"—DiSalle allowed the execution. He cited the case as an example of how the justice system had failed to study the behavior of a minor criminal to prevent him from committing murder.

After leaving the governorship, DiSalle co-founded and served as a chairman of the National Committee to Abolish Federal Death Penalty. His 1965 book, The Power of Life or Death, discusses this issue and chronicles his difficult experiences as the man charged with making the final decision regarding a sentence commutation. He is quoted in the book Mercy on Trial: What It Means to Stop an Execution as saying, "No one who has never watched the hands of a clock marking the last minutes of a condemned man's existence, knowing that he alone has the temporary Godlike power to stop the clock, can realize the agony of deciding an appeal for executive clemency".

== Later life and death ==
In 1966, DiSalle joined the Washington, D.C., law firm of Chapman, Duff, and Paul. In 1979, he co-founded the Washington, D.C., law firm of DiSalle & Staudinger. The same year, DiSalle also authored the book Second Choice, a history of the U.S. vice presidency.

DiSalle led a draft movement for a potential 1968 presidential campaign by Senator Ted Kennedy. He later served as the honorary chairman of Kennedy's 1980 presidential campaign.

DiSalle died on September 16, 1981, of a heart attack while vacationing in Pescara, Italy. In Toledo, the Michael DiSalle Government Center and Michael V. DiSalle Bridge, which carries I-75 across the Maumee River, are named after him The DiSalle Center (no longer standing) at the Ohio Expo Center and the Ohio State Fair in Columbus, Ohio, was also named in his honor.

== Electoral history ==
Michael DiSalle electoral history

U.S. House election (Ohio's 9th district), 1946
Party	Candidate	Votes	%
Republican	Homer A. Ramey (incumbent)	59,394	50.14%
Democratic	Michael DiSalle	59,057	49.86%
Total votes		118,451	100.00%
Republican hold			

U.S. Senate primary election (Ohio, Class 3), 1950
Party	Candidate	Votes	%
Democratic	Joseph T. Ferguson	159,191	39.38%
Democratic	Michael DiSalle	105,601	26.12%
Democratic	Henry M. Busch	53,048	13.12%
Democratic	William L. White	27,863	6.89%
Democratic	Walter A. Kelley	22,814	5.64%
Democratic	John Martin	22,802	5.64%
Democratic	Edward Welsh	12,960	3.21%
Total votes		404,279	100.00%

Party political offices
Preceded by James W. Huffman	Democratic nominee for U.S. Senator from Ohio (Class 1); 1952	Succeeded by Stephen M. Young
Preceded by Frank Lausche	Democratic nominee for Governor of Ohio; 1956, 1958, 1962	Succeeded by Frazier Reams
Political offices
Preceded by Lloyd Emerson Roulet	Mayor of Toledo; January 1948 – November 30, 1950	Succeeded by Ollie Czelusta
Preceded by Roger Putnam	Director of the Economic Stabilization Agency; December 22, 1952 – January 20, 1953	Agency abolished
Preceded by C. William O'Neill	Governor of Ohio; January 12, 1959 – January 14, 1963	Succeeded by Jim Rhodes
