= Clingan Jackson =

American politician and newspaperman

Clingan Jackson (March 28, 1907 – May 26, 1997) was a Democratic politician and newspaperman.

== Biography ==
Jackson was born in Coitsville, Ohio, on March 28, 1907, and was raised on the east side of the city and in towns on either side of the Ohio border with Pennsylvania. He graduated in 1929 from University of Colorado, having received a bachelor's degree in political science. He began work in 1929 as a reporter for the Youngstown Vindicator newspaper. His first political experience was as a city councilman in Lowellville, Ohio; he was elected to the position in 1933, after gaining attention for the obituary he wrote for his predecessor.

Jackson was elected to the Ohio House of Representatives in 1935 and served three terms in the Ohio State Senate after his first election to that body in 1945. The Ohio Department of Natural Resources was the product of a bill written by Jackson while he was in the Ohio Senate, and he also wrote bills creating laws governing strip mining. He also served as the chair of the Senate Finance Committee in 1949. Jackson was appointed as a member of the Ohio Program Commission the following year. Jackson was a candidate for in the Democratic primary for the 1958 Ohio gubernatorial election. He had earlier been appointed to the Ohio Pardon and Parole Commission by Governor C. William O'Neill, and former Governor Frank Lausche had appointed him to the State Highway Construction Council in 1953. In 1963, Jackson was appointed to the Ohio Civil Rights Commission. He continued work as a reporter and editor for the Vindicator until his retirement in 1983. As of 1984, Jackson had held government positions during the administrations of the twelve most recent governors of the state; his term on the Civil Rights Commission expired the following year.

== Death ==
Jackson died in Youngstown on May 26, 1997.

== See also ==
- Ohio gubernatorial elections
