= 1940 Ohio gubernatorial election =

- November 5, 1940
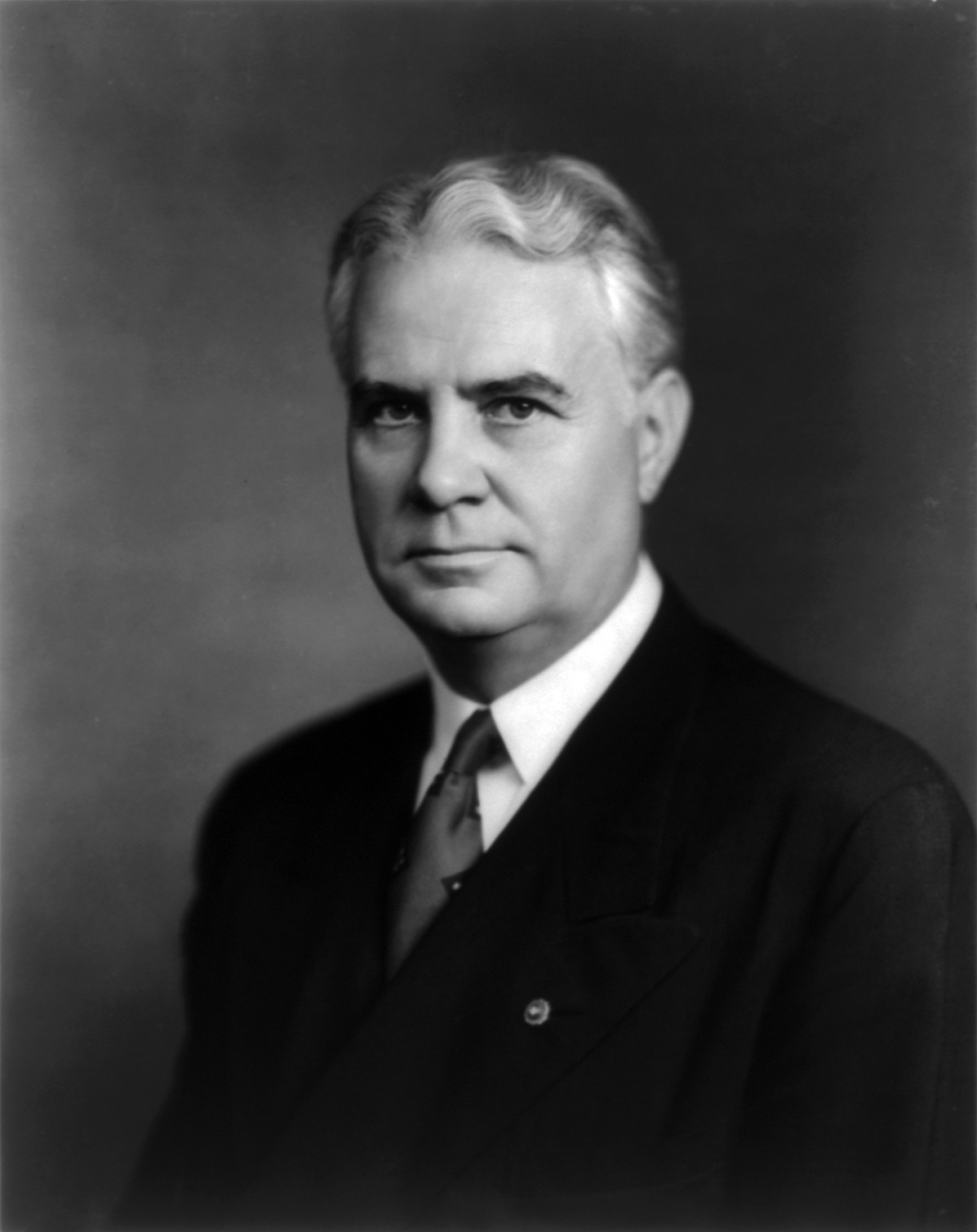

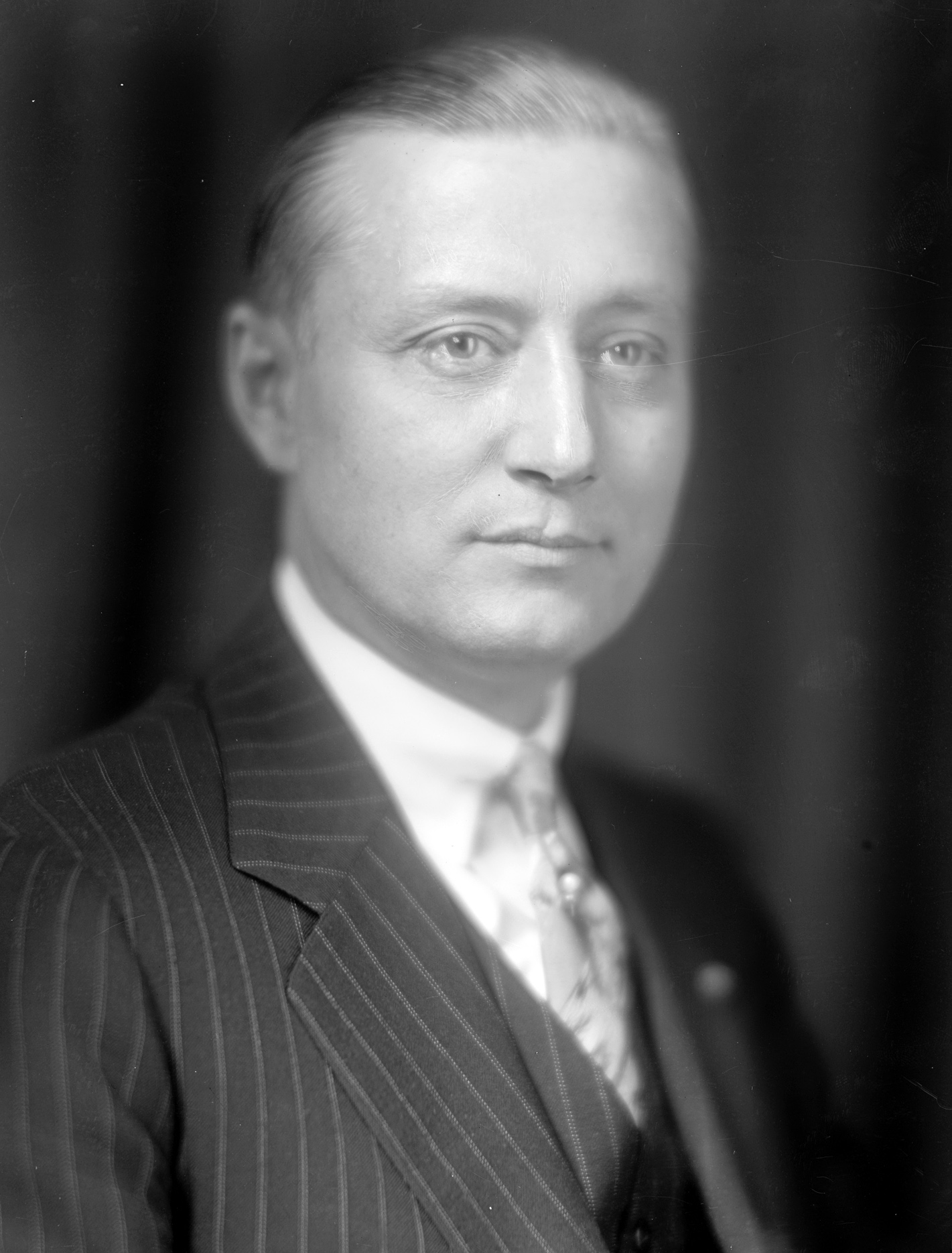
Nominee	John W. Bricker	Martin L. Davey
Party	Republican	Democratic
Popular vote	1,824,863	1,460,396
Percentage	55.55%	44.45%
- County results Bricker: 50–60% 60–70% 70–80% Davey: 50–60% 60–70%
Governor before election
John W. Bricker
Republican
Elected Governor
John W. Bricker
Republican

The 1940 Ohio gubernatorial election was held on November 5, 1940. Incumbent Republican John W. Bricker defeated Democratic nominee Martin L. Davey with 55.55% of the vote.

== Primary elections ==
Primary elections were held on May 14, 1940.

=== Democratic primary ===
==== Candidates ====
- Martin L. Davey, former Governor
- George White, former Governor
- William J. Kennedy
- Herbert S. Duffy, former Ohio Attorney General
- Harold G. Mosier, former U.S. Representative
- James F. Flynn
- Frank A. Dye

==== Results ====
Democratic primary results
Party	Candidate	Votes	%
Democratic	Martin L. Davey	304,509	51.85
Democratic	George White	123,729	21.07
Democratic	William J. Kennedy	86,530	14.74
Democratic	Herbert S. Duffy	31,401	5.35
Democratic	Harold G. Mosier	19,449	3.31
Democratic	James F. Flynn	14,267	2.43
Democratic	Frank A. Dye	7,359	1.25
Total votes		587,244	100.00

=== Republican primary ===
==== Candidates ====
- John W. Bricker, incumbent Governor

==== Results ====
Republican primary results
Party	Candidate	Votes	%
Republican	John W. Bricker (incumbent)	612,610	100.00
Total votes		612,610	100.00

== General election ==
=== Candidates ===
- John W. Bricker, Republican
- Martin L. Davey, Democratic

=== Results ===
1940 Ohio gubernatorial election
Party	Candidate	Votes	%	±%
Republican	John W. Bricker (incumbent)	1,824,863	55.55%	
Democratic	Martin L. Davey	1,460,396	44.45%	
Majority				
Turnout				
Republican hold		Swing		
