= 1958 Ohio gubernatorial election =

- November 4, 1958
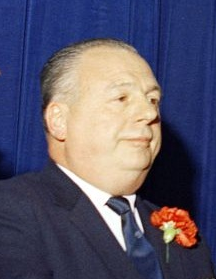

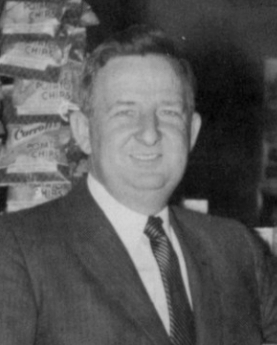
Nominee	Michael DiSalle	C. William O'Neill
Party	Democratic	Republican
Popular vote	1,869,260	1,414,874
Percentage	56.92%	43.08%
- County results DiSalle: 50–60% 60–70% O'Neill: 50–60% 60–70%
Governor before election
C. William O'Neill
Republican
Elected Governor
Michael DiSalle
Democratic

The 1958 Ohio gubernatorial election was held on November 4, 1958. Democratic nominee Michael DiSalle defeated incumbent Republican C. William O'Neill in a rematch of the 1956 election with 56.92% of the vote.

This was the first election which Ohio governors held four-year terms and were limited to holding office for two successive terms following a 1957 amendment to the Ohio constitution.

== Primary elections ==
Primary elections were held on May 6, 1958.

=== Democratic primary ===
==== Candidates ====
- Michael DiSalle, former mayor of Toledo
- Anthony J. Celebrezze, mayor of Cleveland
- Albert S. Porter, Cuyahoga County Engineer
- Robert N. Gorman, former associate justice of the Ohio Supreme Court
- Jack Sensenbrenner, mayor of Columbus
- Clingan Jackson, former Ohio state senator
- Vivienne L. Suarez

==== Results ====
Democratic primary results
Party	Candidate	Votes	%
Democratic	Michael DiSalle	242,830	37.71
Democratic	Anthony J. Celebrezze	140,453	21.81
Democratic	Albert S. Porter	108,498	16.85
Democratic	Robert N. Gorman	57,694	8.96
Democratic	Jack Sensenbrenner	52,350	8.13
Democratic	Clingan Jackson	35,175	5.46
Democratic	Vivienne L. Suarez	6,928	1.08
Total votes		643,928	100.00

=== Republican primary ===
==== Candidates ====
- C. William O'Neill, incumbent governor
- Charles Phelps Taft II, former mayor of Cincinnati

==== Results ====
Republican primary results
Party	Candidate	Votes	%
Republican	C. William O'Neill (incumbent)	346,660	63.63
Republican	Charles Phelps Taft II	198,173	36.37
Total votes		544,833	100.00

== General election ==
=== Candidates ===
- Michael DiSalle, Democratic
- C. William O'Neill, Republican

=== Results ===
1958 Ohio gubernatorial election
Party	Candidate	Votes	%	±%
Democratic	Michael DiSalle	1,869,260	56.92%	
Republican	C. William O'Neill (incumbent)	1,414,874	43.08%	
Majority		454,386		
Turnout		3,284,134		
Democratic gain from Republican		Swing		
