= 1936 Ohio gubernatorial election =

- November 3, 1936
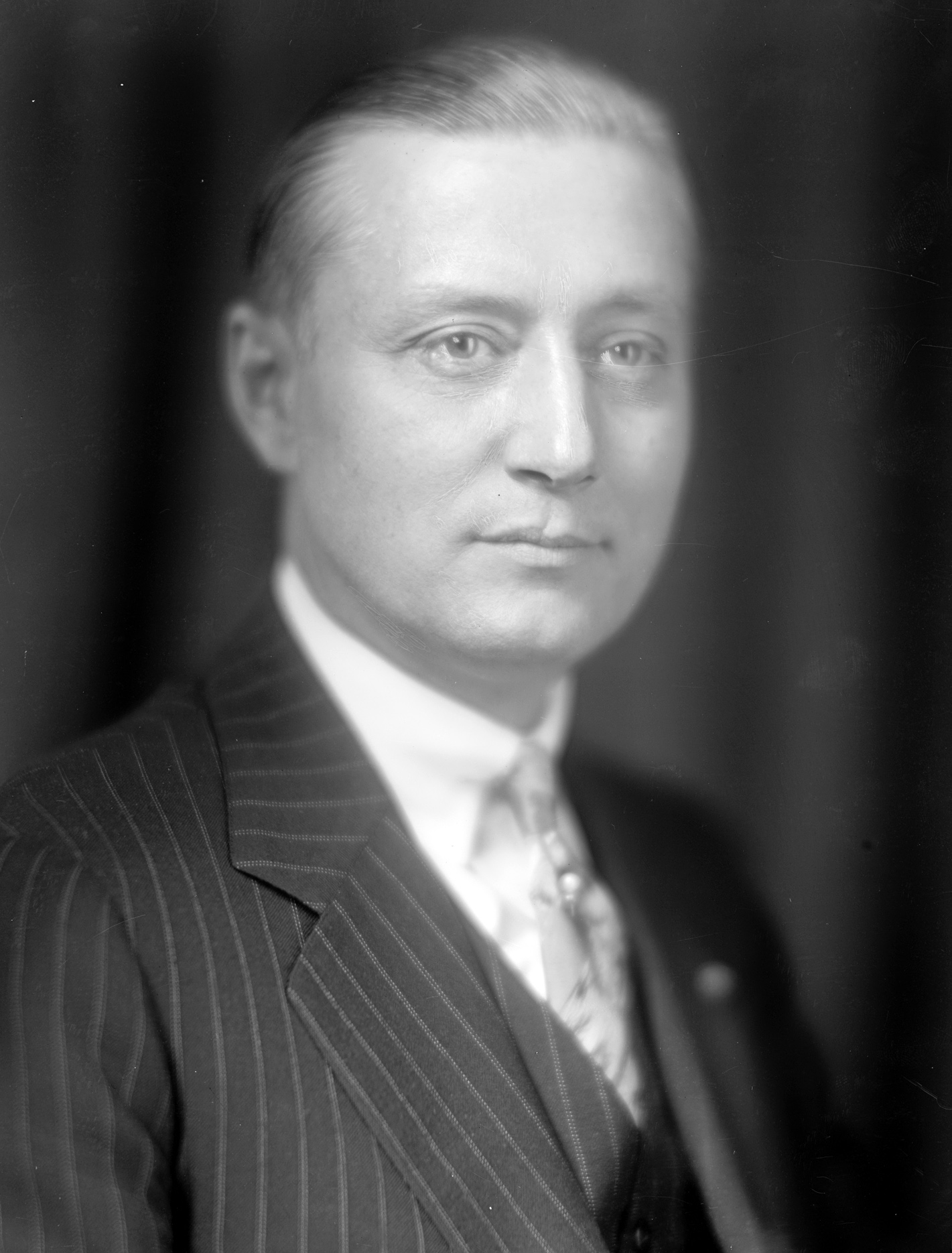

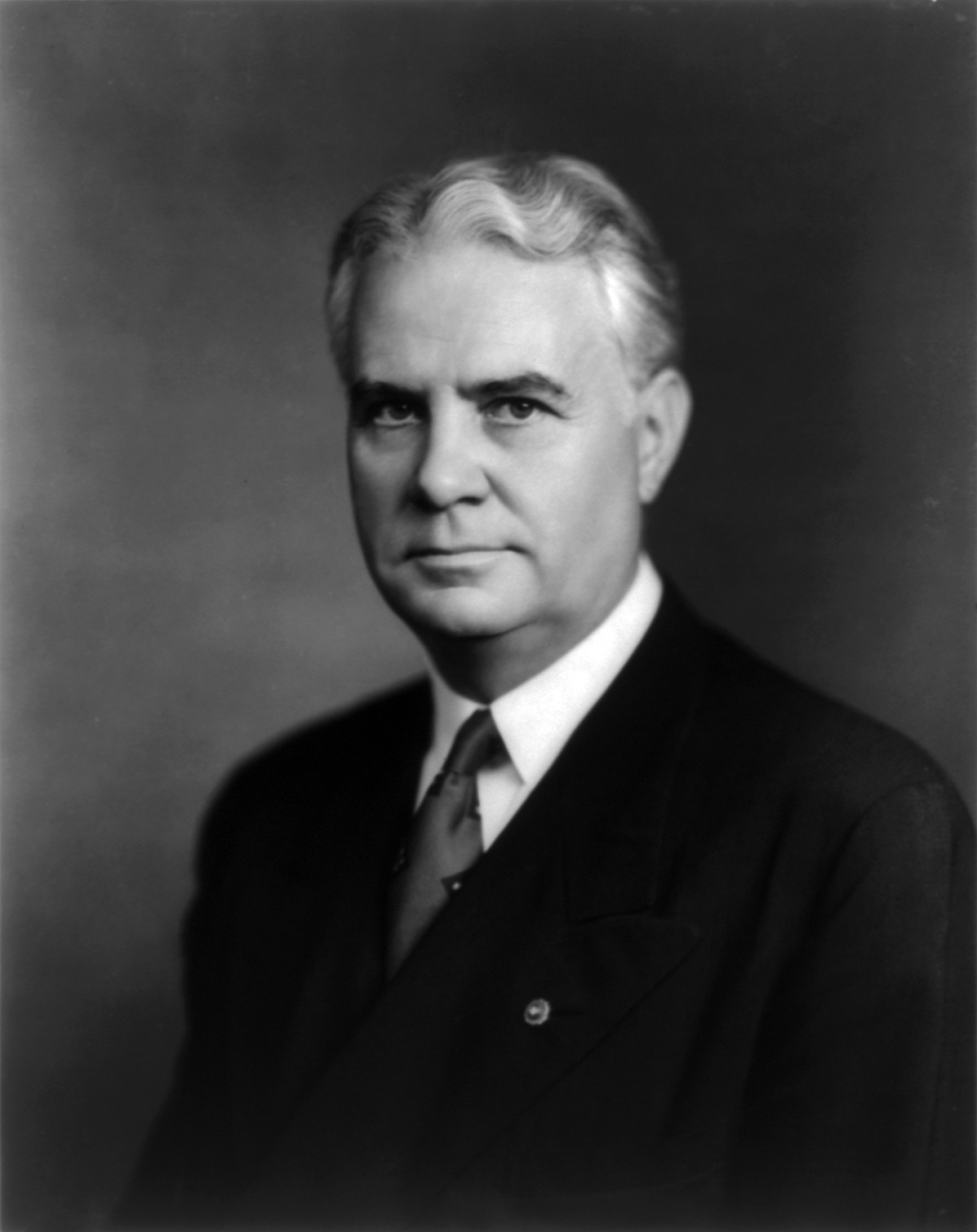
Nominee	Martin L. Davey	John W. Bricker
Party	Democratic	Republican
Popular vote	1,539,461	1,412,773
Percentage	52.02%	47.74%
- County results Davey: 50–60% 60–70% Bricker: 50–60% 60–70%
Governor before election
Martin L. Davey
Democratic
Elected Governor
Martin L. Davey
Democratic

The 1936 Ohio gubernatorial election was held on November 3, 1936. Incumbent Democrat Martin L. Davey defeated Republican nominee John W. Bricker with 52.02% of the vote.

== General election ==
=== Candidates ===
Major party candidates

- Martin L. Davey, Democratic
- John W. Bricker, Republican

Other candidates

- Andrew R. Onda, Communist

=== Results ===
1936 Ohio gubernatorial election
Party	Candidate	Votes	%	±%
Democratic	Martin L. Davey (incumbent)	1,539,461	52.02%	
Republican	John W. Bricker	1,412,773	47.74%	
Communist	Andrew R. Onda	7,372	0.25%	
Majority		126,688		
Turnout				
Democratic hold		Swing		
