= 1944 Ohio gubernatorial election =

- November 7, 1944
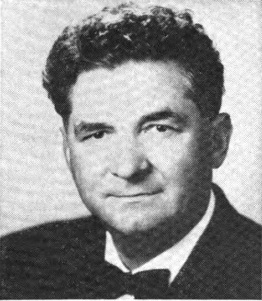

Nominee	Frank Lausche	James Garfield Stewart
Party	Democratic	Republican
Popular vote	1,603,809	1,491,450
Percentage	51.82%	48.19%
- County results Lausche: 50–60% 60–70% Stewart: 50–60% 60–70% 70–80%
Governor before election
John W. Bricker
Republican
Elected Governor
Frank Lausche
Democratic

The 1944 Ohio gubernatorial election was held on November 7, 1944. Democratic nominee Frank Lausche defeated Republican nominee James Garfield Stewart with 51.82% of the vote.

== Primary elections ==
Primary elections were held on May 9, 1944.

=== Democratic primary ===
==== Candidates ====
- Frank Lausche, Mayor of Cleveland
- Martin L. Sweeney, former U.S. Representative
- James W. Huffman, former Chairman of the Ohio Public Utilities Commission
- Frazier Reams, Toledo Collector of Internal Revenue
- Frank A. Dye
- Walter Baertschi

==== Results ====
Democratic primary results
Party	Candidate	Votes	%
Democratic	Frank Lausche	179,961	54.93
Democratic	Martin L. Sweeney	64,227	19.60
Democratic	James W. Huffman	38,124	11.64
Democratic	Frazier Reams	26,074	7.96
Democratic	Frank A. Dye	10,862	3.32
Democratic	Walter Baertschi	8,402	2.56
Total votes		327,650	100.00

=== Republican primary ===
==== Candidates ====
- James Garfield Stewart, Mayor of Cincinnati
- Thomas J. Herbert, Ohio Attorney General
- Paul M. Herbert, incumbent Lieutenant Governor
- Albert Edward Payne

==== Results ====
Republican primary results
Party	Candidate	Votes	%
Republican	James Garfield Stewart	162,802	34.23
Republican	Thomas J. Herbert	160,598	33.76
Republican	Paul M. Herbert	137,359	28.88
Republican	Albert Edward Payne	14,927	3.14
Total votes		475,686	100.00

== General election ==
=== Candidates ===
- Frank Lausche, Democratic
- James Garfield Stewart, Republican

=== Results ===
1944 Ohio gubernatorial election
Party	Candidate	Votes	%	±%
Democratic	Frank Lausche	1,603,809	51.82%	
Republican	James Garfield Stewart	1,491,450	48.19%	
Majority				
Turnout				
Democratic gain from Republican		Swing		
