= 1958 United States Senate election in Ohio =

- November 4, 1958
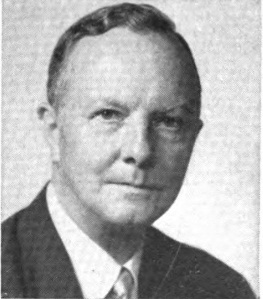

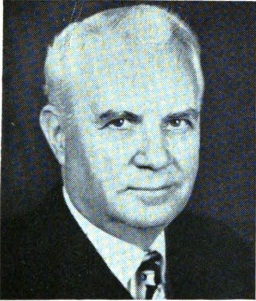
Nominee	Stephen M. Young	John W. Bricker
Party	Democratic	Republican
Popular vote	1,652,211	1,497,199
Percentage	52.46%	47.54%
- County results Young: 50–60% 60–70% Bricker: 50–60% 60–70%
U.S. senator before election
John W. Bricker
Republican
Elected U.S. Senator
Stephen M. Young
Democratic

The 1958 United States Senate election in Ohio was held on November 4, 1958. Incumbent senator John W. Bricker was defeated in his bid for a third term by former U.S. representative Stephen M. Young.

This was one of a record 15 seats Democrats gained from the Republican Party in 1958.

== General election ==
=== Candidates ===
- John W. Bricker, incumbent senator since 1947 (Republican)
- Stephen M. Young, candidate for attorney general in 1956 and former U.S. representative at-large (Democratic)

=== Results ===
1958 U.S. Senate election in Ohio
Party	Candidate	Votes	%	±%
Democratic	Stephen M. Young	1,652,211	52.46%	▲7.04
Republican	John W. Bricker (incumbent)	1,497,199	47.54%	▼7.05
Total votes		3,149,410	100.00%	N/A
Democratic gain from Republican				

== See also ==
- 1958 United States Senate elections
