= 1942 Massachusetts gubernatorial election =

- November 3, 1942
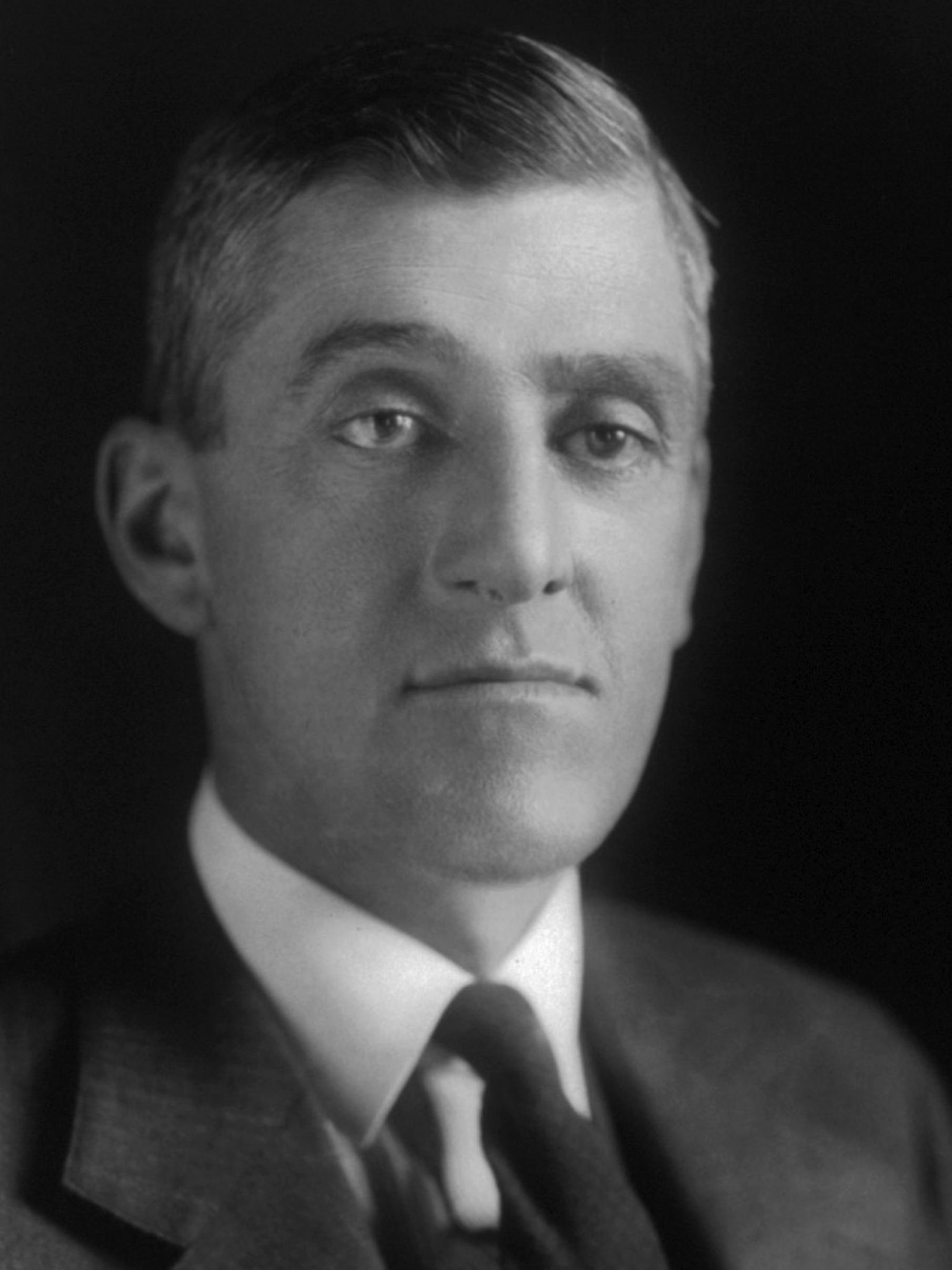

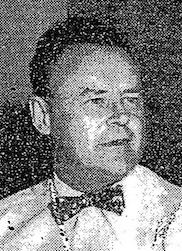
Nominee	Leverett Saltonstall	Roger Putnam
Party	Republican	Democratic
Popular vote	758,402	630,265
Percentage	54.10%	44.96%
- Saltonstall: 40–50% 50–60% 60–70% 70–80% 80–90% >90% Putnam: 40–50% 50–60% 60–70% 70–80%
Governor before election
Leverett Saltonstall
Republican
Elected Governor
Leverett Saltonstall
Republican

The 1942 Massachusetts gubernatorial election was held on November 3, 1942. Republican incumbent Leverett Saltonstall defeated Democrat Roger Putnam, Communist candidate Otis A. Hood, Socialist candidate Joseph Massidda, Socialist Labor candidate Henning A. Blomen, and Prohibition candidate Guy S. Williams.

== Primary ==
Springfield Mayor Roger Putnam defeated former Lieutenant Governor Francis E. Kelly for the Democratic nomination.

Democratic gubernatorial primary, 1942
Party	Candidate	Votes	%	±%
Democratic	Roger Putnam	137,184	54.74%	
Democratic	Francis E. Kelly	113,431	45.26%	
Write-in	All others	5	0.00%	

== General election ==
Massachusetts gubernatorial election, 1942
Party	Candidate	Votes	%	±%
Republican	Leverett Saltonstall (incumbent)	758,402	54.10%	
Democratic	Roger Putnam	630,265	44.96%	
Communist	Otis A. Hood	4,641	0.33%	
Socialist	Joseph Massidda	3,119	0.22%	
Socialist Labor	Henning A. Blomen	3,090	0.22%	
Prohibition	Guy S. Williams	1,898	0.13%	
Write-in	All others	303	0.04%	

== See also ==
- 1941–1942 Massachusetts legislature
