= 1962 Ohio gubernatorial election =

- November 6, 1962
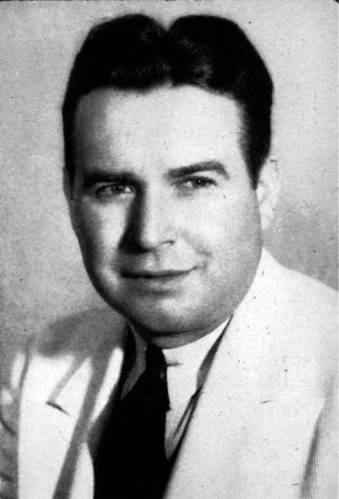

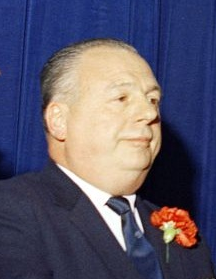
Nominee	Jim Rhodes	Michael DiSalle
Party	Republican	Democratic
Popular vote	1,836,432	1,280,521
Percentage	58.92%	41.08%
- County results Rhodes: 50–60% 60–70% 70–80% DiSalle: 50–60%
Governor before election
Michael DiSalle
Democratic
Elected Governor
Jim Rhodes
Republican

The 1962 Ohio gubernatorial election was held on November 6, 1962. Republican nominee Jim Rhodes defeated Democratic incumbent Michael DiSalle with 58.92% of the vote.

== Primary elections ==
Primary elections were held on May 8, 1962.

=== Democratic primary ===
==== Candidates ====
- Michael DiSalle, incumbent governor
- Mark McElroy, Ohio Attorney General
- Alexander G. Metrakos

==== Results ====
Democratic primary results
Party	Candidate	Votes	%
Democratic	Michael DiSalle (incumbent)	331,463	50.34
Democratic	Mark McElroy	299,207	45.44
Democratic	Alexander G. Metrakos	27,740	4.21
Total votes		658,410	100.00

=== Republican primary ===
==== Candidates ====
- Jim Rhodes, Ohio State Auditor
- William L. White

==== Results ====
Republican primary results
Party	Candidate	Votes	%
Republican	Jim Rhodes	520,868	89.68
Republican	William L. White	59,916	10.32
Total votes		580,784	100.00

== General election ==
=== Candidates ===
- Jim Rhodes, Republican
- Michael DiSalle, Democratic

=== Results ===
1962 Ohio gubernatorial election
Party	Candidate	Votes	%	±%
Republican	Jim Rhodes	1,836,432	58.92%	
Democratic	Michael DiSalle (incumbent)	1,280,521	41.08%	
Majority		555,911		
Turnout		3,116,953		
Republican gain from Democratic		Swing		
