= Economic Stabilization Agency =

American government agency

- ESA

Agency overview
- Formed: September 9, 1950
- Preceding agency: similar agency: Office for Emergency Management (World War II)
- Dissolved: April 30, 1953
- Jurisdiction: Federal government of the United States
- Headquarters: Washington, D.C.
- Agency executives: Michael DiSalle, 1950; Alan Valentine, 1950–51; Eric Johnston, 1951; Roger Putnam, 1951–52
- Parent agency: Executive Office of the President
- Child agencies: Office of Price Stabilization; Wage Stabilization Board; Salary Stabilization Board; Office of Rent Stabilization; Railroad and Airline Wage Board; National Enforcement Commission

The Economic Stabilization Agency (ESA) was an agency of the United States Government that existed from 1950 to 1953.

The creation of the ESA was authorized by the Defense Production Act (Pub. L. 81–774, 64 Stat. 798), which was signed into law by President of the United States Harry S. Truman on September 8, 1950. The Defense Production Act was passed in response to the start of the Korean War and authorized the President to control the civilian economy so that scarce and/or critical materials necessary to the national defense effort are available for defense needs.

On September 9, 1950, President Truman signed the Executive Order 10161, thus creating the ESA. The ESA was responsible for imposing price ceilings and wage controls on the United States economy. In this capacity, the ESA was responsible for supervising the Office of Price Stabilization, the Wage Stabilization Board, the Salary Stabilization Board, the Office of Rent Stabilization, the Railroad and Airline Wage Board, and the National Enforcement Commission.

The price control provisions of the Defense Production Act expired in 1953, so, on February 6, 1953, President Eisenhower signed Executive Order 10434 abolishing the ESA effective April 30, 1953. Executive Order 10480, signed August 14, 1953, ordered the liquidation of the ESA, and this was complete by October 31, 1953.

== Directors of the ESA ==
- Michael DiSalle, 1950
- Alan Valentine, 1950–51
- Eric Johnston, 1951
- Roger Putnam, 1951–52

== Archives ==
- "General Records of the Economic Stabilization Agency at the National Archives".
