= C. William O'Neill =

American judge (1916–1978)

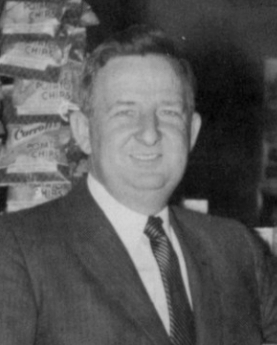

Chief Justice of the Ohio Supreme Court
- In office April 3, 1970 – August 20, 1978
- Preceded by: Kingsley A. Taft
- Succeeded by: Robert E. Leach

Associate Justice of the Ohio Supreme Court
- In office November 30, 1960 – April 4, 1970
- Preceded by: John Weld Peck II
- Succeeded by: Leonard J. Stern

59th Governor of Ohio
- In office January 14, 1957 – January 12, 1959
- Lieutenant: Paul M. Herbert
- Preceded by: John William Brown
- Succeeded by: Michael DiSalle

37th Ohio Attorney General
- In office January 8, 1951 – January 7, 1957
- Governor: Frank Lausche; John William Brown
- Preceded by: Herbert S. Duffy
- Succeeded by: William B. Saxbe

87th Speaker of the Ohio House of Representatives
- In office January 6, 1947 – January 2, 1949
- Preceded by: Jackson E. Betts
- Succeeded by: John F. Cantwell

Personal details
- Born: February 14, 1916 Marietta, Ohio, U.S.
- Died: August 20, 1978 (aged 62) Columbus, Ohio, U.S.
- Party: Republican
- Spouse: Betty Hewson
- Education: Marietta College (BA); Ohio State University (JD)

Military service
- Allegiance: United States
- Branch/service: United States Army
- Years of service: 1943–1946
- Battles/wars: World War II

C. William O'Neill (February 14, 1916 – August 20, 1978) was an American judge and Republican politician, who served as the 59th governor of Ohio.

== Biography ==
C. William O'Neill was born in Marietta, Ohio on February 14, 1916. He was the 59th governor of Ohio. He graduated from both Marietta College (1938) and Ohio State University Moritz College of Law (1942). While at Marietta he joined The Delta Upsilon University.

O'Neill served as a state representative and as Speaker of the House. He was then elected the State Attorney General in 1950, being the youngest person elected to the office at age 34. He served from 1951 to 1957, when he was elected to the governorship. O'Neill served until 1959. He was defeated for re-election due to his support of the controversial proposed "right to work" amendment to the Ohio Constitution. He served on the Ohio Supreme Court from 1960 until his death serving as an associate justice, then chief justice. O'Neill was the only Ohioan to serve in top leadership positions in the legislative, executive and judicial branches of Ohio.

O'Neill was married to Betty Hewson on July 29, 1945, and they had two children. He died on August 20, 1978, and his funeral service was at First Community Church in Columbus. He was buried at Oak Grove Cemetery in Marietta.

== Legacy ==
The O'Neill Building at the Ohio Expo Center and State Fair in Columbus, Ohio, is named in honor of O'Neill. Additionally, The C. William O'Neill Senior Citizens Center in Marietta, Ohio is named in his honor.

Legal offices
Preceded by Herbert S. Duffy	Ohio Attorney General; 1951–1957	Succeeded by William B. Saxbe
Party political offices
Preceded by Hugh S. Jenkins	Republican nominee for Attorney General of Ohio; 1950, 1952, 1954	Succeeded by William B. Saxbe
Preceded by Jim Rhodes	Republican Party nominee for Governor of Ohio; 1956, 1958	Succeeded by Jim Rhodes
