= Albert S. Porter =

American politician (1904–1979)

- Born: November 4, 1904; Portsmouth, Virginia, U.S.
- Died: January 7, 1979 (aged 74)
- Education: Lakewood High School; Ohio State University (BS)
- Occupations: Engineer; politician
- Spouse: Genevieve Shaveyco (m. 1949)
- Children: 3

Albert S. Porter (November 4, 1904 – January 7, 1979) was an American engineer and politician from Ohio.

== Early life ==
Porter was born in Portsmouth, Virginia, to Albert S. and Lena Edmonds Porter. He moved with his family to Lakewood, Ohio in 1913, graduated from Lakewood High School in 1922 and from Ohio State University with his B.S. in civil engineering in 1928.

In 1929 he joined the Cleveland Highway Research Bureau, becoming chief assistant to county engineer John O. McWilliams in 1933 and served until 1943, when he succeeded him. He also served five years in the United States Navy during World War II.

== Political career ==
He was a Cuyahoga County engineer for 29 years (since 1943, defeated for reelection in 1976) and county Democratic party chairman for 6 years (1963–1969), and a delegate to the 1952, 1964 and 1972 Democratic National Conventions. During his tenure as county engineer much of the freeway system linking Cleveland to its suburbs was built.

Porter unsuccessfully ran for mayor of Cleveland in 1953 and also unsuccessfully sought the 1958 Democratic nomination for Governor of Ohio, losing decisively to Michael DiSalle. He is perhaps best remembered as an Ohio favorite-son candidate in both 1960 and 1964 Democratic presidential primaries. In 1960 he lost the Ohio primary to Governor DiSalle, carrying 39.75% to DiSalle's 60.25%. This placed him 8th in nationwide popular vote (3.52%) Four years later he was unopposed and carried the Ohio primary with 100%. and placed 6th nationwide (7.94%) As with other favorite sons that fall, he supported the reelection of President Lyndon B. Johnson.

=== Controversy and downfall ===
Porter planned to build Interstate 290 (Ohio), commonly referred to as the Clark Freeway, through the Shaker Lakes, a park that preserved a historic site. Once the Clark freeway was completed, a secondary freeway, the Lee freeway, would be built from I-480 to I-90. The interchange between Clark and Lee freeways would replace the Shaker Nature center. When a coalition of citizens' groups organized to fight this plan, Porter called the Shaker Lakes "a two-bit duck pond." Plans for the Clark Freeway, and the Lee Freeway failed after Ohio’s Governor, James Rhodes withdrew funding after local residents organized against the plan.

Porter threatened to remove the historic Guardians of Transportation pylons from the Hope Memorial Bridge to widen it, stating, "Those columns are monstrosities and should be torn down and forgotten. There is nothing particularly historic about any one of them. We're not running a May Show here." (In a protective move, the bridge was placed on National Register of Historic Places on October 8, 1976; the Cleveland Guardians baseball team was later named after the pylons.) In May 1976 Beth Ann Louis, a twelve-year-old girl in Olmsted Falls, wrote to Porter as part of a school assignment, asking him not to replace the Bagley Road bridge because of the impact on wildlife and the environment. Porter replied to her with a disparaging letter that included several misspellings, calling Olmsted Falls residents "moochers, scroungers, chiselers and parasites." Public outrage resulted.

In September 1976 a number of Porter's employees told The Plain Dealer in a series of articles authored by reporter Amos A. Kermisch that for years he had forced them to kick back two percent of their pay. That November he was defeated for reelection. As a result of a grand jury investigation in 1977, which was launched following the articles in The Plain Dealer, Porter pleaded guilty to 19 counts of theft in office for the kickback scheme and was fined $10,000 and placed on probation for two years.

== Personal life ==
Porter married Genevieve Shaveyco in 1949. They had two sons and one daughter.
