= Wage Stabilization Board =

Defunct independent agency of the United States government

National Wage Stabilization Board
- NWSB

Agency overview
- Formed: January 1, 1946
- Preceding agency: National War Labor Board
- Dissolved: February 24, 1947
- Superseding agencies: National Labor Relations Board; Wage Stabilization Board
- Jurisdiction: Federal government of the United States
- Headquarters: Washington, D.C.
- Parent agency: Executive Office of the President

Wage Stabilization Board
- WSB

Agency overview
- Formed: September 9, 1950
- Preceding agencies: National Wage Stabilization Board; National Labor Relations Board
- Dissolved: February 6, 1953
- Superseding agencies: National Labor Relations Board; Agencies with similar functions: Pay Board and Price Commission(Nixon-era)
- Jurisdiction: Federal government of the United States
- Headquarters: Washington, D.C.
- Parent agency: Economic Stabilization Agency

The Wage Stabilization Board (WSB) was an independent agency of the United States government whose function was to make wage control policy recommendations and to implement such wage controls as were approved. There were two agencies with the same name. The first, the National Wage Stabilization Board, was the successor to the National War Labor Board, and existed from January 1, 1946, to February 24, 1947. The second, the Wage Stabilization Board, was a part of the Office of Defense Mobilization and existed from September 9, 1950, to February 6, 1953.

== National Wage Stabilization Board ==
The first agency, known as the National Wage Stabilization Board, was established by President Harry S. Truman within the United States Department of Labor in on January 1, 1946. The purpose of the new agency was to continue the work of the National War Labor Board. Executive Order 9809, issued on December 12, 1946, abolished the National Wage Stabilization Board effective February 24, 1947.

== Wage Stabilization Board ==
The Korean War broke out on June 25, 1950. After an initial (and significant) surge of inflation, President Harry S. Truman's war mobilization effort began to achieve some success in stabilizing the American economy.

On September 8, 1950, the U.S. Congress enacted the Defense Production Act. The Act gave the President statutory authority to order companies to do business with the United States in order to furnish equipment and services needed for national defense; to establish federal agencies as needed to implement the Act; and to allocate resources, personnel and funds to ensure national defense needs were met. However, the Act tied wage controls to prices. If any price ceiling was imposed, the government was required to issue regulations and orders stabilizing wages in the affected industry.

The next day, President Truman issued Executive Order (EO) 10161, which established the Economic Stabilization Agency (ESA) to coordinate and supervise wage and price controls. Utilizing the wage and price control model developed in World War II, the Truman administration created two sub-agencies within ESA. The Office of Price Stabilization (OPS) was given the power to regulate prices, while the Wage Stabilization Board (WSB) oversaw the creation of wage stabilization rules. The division of labor was specifically designed to unlink wages from prices. If prices rose automatically with wages, the inflationary spiral would continue unabated. Placing the onus solely on workers to keep wages low risked the wrath of labor, a lesson the administration had learned from the WWII experience. Delinking wages and prices leveled the playing field. Both workers and employers would now be forced to justify, independently, the wages and prices they demanded. The Wage Stabilization Board was authorized to control wages only for hourly employees. However, the WSB's authority in this regard was extremely limited.

=== Structure ===
The Economic Stabilization Agency had overall authority to coordinate and implement wage and price policies. Within ESA were three sub-agencies:

- The Office of Price Stabilization (OPS), which recommended price control policies to the ESA, and implemented policies which ESA had approved.
- The Wage Stabilization Board, which recommended wage control policies to the ESA, and implemented policies which ESA had approved.
- The Office of the Housing Expediter (OHE), which recommended rent control policies to the ESA, and implemented policies which ESA had approved.

The WSB had nine members. Three members represented the public, three represented labor, and three represented business and industry. Initially, the WSB's three "public" members were Cyrus S. Ching, director of the Federal Mediation and Conciliation Service; Clark Kerr, professor of industrial relations at the University of California, Berkeley; and John Thomas Dunlop, a professor of economics at Harvard University. The three labor representatives were Harry C. Bates, president of the International Union of Bricklayers and Allied Craftworkers; Emil Rieve, president of the Textile Workers Union of America; and Elmer Walker, president of the International Association of Machinists. The three business representatives were Henry B. Arthur, manager of the research department at meat processor Swift & Co.; J. Ward Keener, vice president of the B.F. Goodrich tire company; and Reuben B. Robinson president of the Champion Paper Co.

The WSB was politically divided, however. On April 21, 1951, President Truman issued Executive Order 10233, which reconstituted the Wage Stabilization Board. Its members increased from nine to 18, and it was now given the power to issue recommendations and reports directly to the President in wage disputes.

=== History ===
The reconstituted board did not retain all its powers for long, however. Executive Order 10276, issued on July 31, 1951, established the Office of Rent Stabilization. The new office was given the WSB's rent control powers, as well as given new powers to encourage the construction of rental units in areas near defense industries. By the end of 1951, the Office of Rent Stabilization had controlled the rent for 6.8 million rental units.

On October 19, 1951, the WSB issued its first wage dispute resolution case.

On August 30, 1952, Truman signed Executive Order 10390, which provided for alternate members for the WSB.

=== Abolition ===
On February 6, 1953, President Dwight Eisenhower issued Executive Order 10434, which effectively abolished the Wage Stabilization Board.

== Bibliography ==
- "Executive Order 10161. September 9, 1950." John Woolley and Gerhard Peters, The American Presidency Project. Santa Barbara, Calif.: University of California (hosted), Gerhard Peters (database). No date. Accessed June 2, 2007.
- Hogan, Michael J. A Cross of Iron: Harry S. Truman and the Origins of the National Security State, 1945-1954. New York: Cambridge University Press, 1998.
- Marcus, Maeva. Truman and the Steel Seizure Case: The Limits of Presidential Power. New York: Columbia University Press, 1977.
- The National Wage Stabilization Board, January 1, 1946-February 24, 1947: A Documentary History of the Board Together With Brief Explanations of Its Formation, Organization, and Activities. South Hackensack, N.J.: F. B. Rothman, 1973.
- Pierpaoli, Paul G., Jr. ''Truman's Other War: The Battle for the American Homefront, 1950-1953." OAH Magazine of History. 14:3 (Spring 2000).
- Pierpaoli, Paul G., Jr. Truman and Korea: The Political Culture of the Early Cold War. Columbia: University of Missouri Press, 1999.
