= 1956 Ohio gubernatorial election =

- November 6, 1956
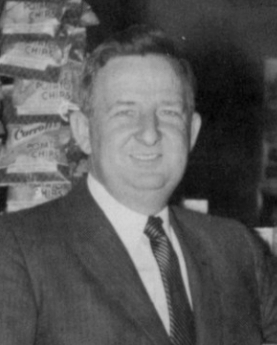

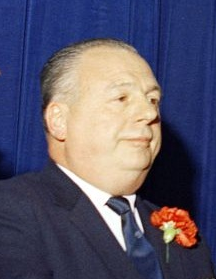
| Nominee | C. William O'Neill | Michael DiSalle |
| Party | Republican | Democratic |
| Popular vote | 1,984,988 | 1,557,103 |
| Percentage | 56.04% | 43.96% |
- County results O'Neill: 50–60% 60–70% 70–80% DiSalle: 50–60%
Governor before election
Frank Lausche
Democratic
Elected Governor
C. William O'Neill
Republican

The 1956 Ohio gubernatorial election was held on November 6, 1956. Republican nominee C. William O'Neill defeated Democratic nominee Michael DiSalle with 56.04% of the vote.

== Primary elections ==
Primary elections were held on May 8, 1956.

=== Democratic primary ===
==== Candidates ====
- Michael DiSalle, former Mayor of Toledo
- John E. Sweeney, former Ohio Secretary of State
- Robert W. Reider
- Frank X. Kryzan, Mayor of Youngstown
- Oscar L. Fleckner

==== Results ====
Democratic primary results
| Party | Candidate | Votes | % |
|---|---|---|---|
| Democratic | Michael DiSalle | 279,831 | 57.40 |
| Democratic | John E. Sweeney | 106,071 | 21.76 |
| Democratic | Robert W. Reider | 41,224 | 8.46 |
| Democratic | Frank X. Kryzan | 37,290 | 7.65 |
| Democratic | Oscar L. Fleckner | 23,081 | 4.74 |
| Total votes | | 487,497 | 100.00 |

=== Republican primary ===
==== Candidates ====
- C. William O'Neill, Ohio Attorney General
- John William Brown, incumbent Lieutenant Governor

==== Results ====
Republican primary results
| Party | Candidate | Votes | % |
|---|---|---|---|
| Republican | C. William O'Neill | 425,947 | 72.47 |
| Republican | John William Brown | 161,826 | 27.53 |
| Total votes | | 587,773 | 100.00 |

== General election ==
=== Candidates ===
- C. William O'Neill, Republican
- Michael DiSalle, Democratic

=== Results ===
1956 Ohio gubernatorial election
| Party | Candidate | Votes | % | ±% |
|---|---|---|---|---|
| Republican | C. William O'Neill | 1,984,988 | 56.04% | |
| Democratic | Michael DiSalle | 1,557,103 | 43.96% | |
| Majority | | 427,885 | | |
| Turnout | | 3,542,091 | | |
| Republican gain from Democratic | | Swing | | |
