= John W. Bricker =

U.S. Politician from Ohio

John Bricker
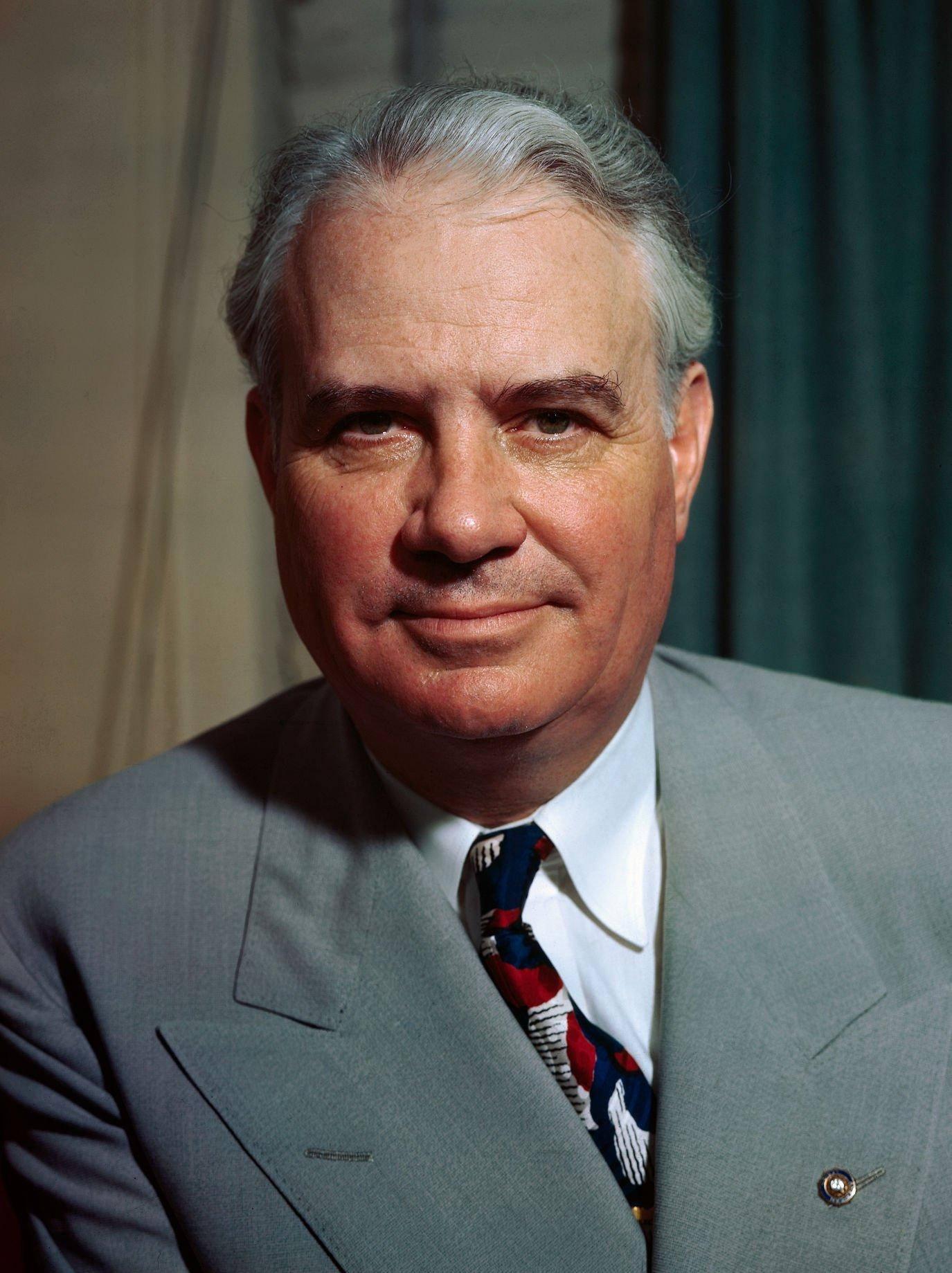
- Bricker in 1944

United States Senator from Ohio
- In office January 3, 1947 – January 3, 1959
- Preceded by: Kingsley A. Taft
- Succeeded by: Stephen M. Young

54th Governor of Ohio
- In office January 9, 1939 – January 8, 1945
- Lieutenant: Paul M. Herbert
- Preceded by: Martin L. Davey
- Succeeded by: Frank Lausche

32nd Attorney General of Ohio
- In office January 9, 1933 – January 11, 1937
- Governor: George White; Martin L. Davey
- Preceded by: Gilbert Bettman
- Succeeded by: Herbert S. Duffy

Personal details
- Born: John William Bricker; September 6, 1893 Mount Sterling, Ohio, U.S.
- Died: March 22, 1986 (aged 92) Columbus, Ohio, U.S.
- Resting place: Green Lawn Cemetery
- Party: Republican
- Spouse: Harriet Day (m. 1920; died 1985)
- Education: Ohio State University (BA, LLB)

Military service
- Branch/service: United States Army
- Years of service: 1918
- Rank: First Lieutenant
- Unit: US Army Chaplain Corps
- Battles/wars: World War I

John William Bricker (September 6, 1893 – March 22, 1986) was an American politician and attorney who served as a United States senator from Ohio from 1947 to 1959, as well as the 54th governor of Ohio from 1939 to 1945. He was also the Republican Party vice presidential nominee in the 1944 presidential election.

Born in Madison County, Ohio, Bricker attended Ohio State University and began a legal practice in Columbus, Ohio. He also served in the United States Army during World War I. He held various public offices between 1920 and 1937, including the position of Ohio Attorney General. Bricker was first elected governor in the 1938 Ohio gubernatorial election and served three terms.

Bricker unsuccessfully sought the 1944 Republican presidential nomination as a conservative. He was defeated by New York Governor Thomas E. Dewey and was instead nominated for vice president as Dewey's running mate. In the general election, Bricker focused his critiques on the New Deal programs and judicial nominees of incumbent President Franklin D. Roosevelt, but the Dewey–Bricker ticket was defeated by Roosevelt and Senator Harry S. Truman.

Bricker won election to the Senate in 1946. He introduced the Bricker Amendment, which would have created limitations of the scope of the president's power to enact treaties and executive agreements with foreign governments. Though the Bricker Amendment received support from some members of both parties, it was not passed by Congress. Bricker won re-election in 1952 but was defeated in 1958 by Democrat Stephen M. Young. After leaving office, Bricker resumed the practice of law and died in 1986.

== Early life and education ==
Bricker was born on a farm near Mount Sterling in Madison County in south central Ohio. He was the son of Laura (née King) and Lemuel Spencer Bricker. He attended Ohio State University at Columbus, where he divided his time between the debating team, the varsity baseball team, and the Delta Chi fraternity. After graduating with a Bachelor of Arts from Ohio State in 1916 and from its law school in 1920, he was admitted to the bar in 1917 and began his legal practice in Columbus in 1920.

== Public service ==
After United States entry into World War I in April 1917, Bricker attempted on several occasions to join the military but was rejected for an abnormally slow heartbeat. Determined to aid the war effort, he worked as a YMCA athletics instructor at Camp Sherman, Ohio. Because he was an active member of the Congregational Christian Church, leaders of his denomination agreed to ordain him for a year so he could qualify for a commission as a chaplain, conditioned on his promise not carry out clergy duties such as preaching. Bricker graduated from the United States Army's Chaplain's course at Camp Zachary Taylor, Kentucky in August 1918. He served as a first lieutenant at Camp Eustis, Virginia in 1918 and was discharged at the end of the war.

After his military service, Bricker returned to law school; after graduation, he began to practice. He served as solicitor for Grandview Heights, Ohio, from 1920 to 1928. He was an assistant Attorney General of Ohio from 1923 to 1927, and a member of the Public Utilities Commission of Ohio from 1929 to 1932. From 1933 to 1937, he served as Attorney General of Ohio.

He was elected governor for three two-year terms, serving from 1939 to 1945, each time winning with a greater margin of victory. Bricker espoused a stance against centralized government, preferring to increase involvement in state and local governments, and made this known in his inaugural address as Governor:

There must be a revitalization of state and local governments throughout the nation. The individual citizen must again be conscious of his responsibility to his government and alert to the preservation of his rights as a citizen under it. That cannot be done by taking government further away, but by keeping it at home.

— John W. Bricker, inaugural gubernatorial address, January 9, 1939.

Bricker was the 1944 Republican nominee for vice president, running with presidential nominee Thomas E. Dewey, the governor of New York who was nine years Bricker's junior. The Republicans lost handily to the Democratic ticket of Franklin D. Roosevelt and Harry S. Truman. In that campaign, Bricker proved to be a tireless campaigner, visiting thirty-one states and making 173 speeches, including 28 over a six-day period. His final remarks came on radio on election eve from the governor's office in Columbus, when he declared: "Not only has the New Deal depleted our resources, recklessly spent our money, but it has undermined the very spiritual foundations of our government." Though most of his campaigning was in New England, the Midwest, and the West, Bricker even visited the then-historically and -heavily Democratic state of Texas, where in Dallas, he called Franklin Roosevelt "a front for the Hillman-Browder Communist Party," referring to the respective leaders of the Congress of Industrial Organizations and the Communist Party of the United States of America.

In 1946, Bricker was elected to the United States Senate. He was re-elected in 1952, serving from January 3, 1947, to January 3, 1959.

Governor Dewey was the Republican presidential nominee again in 1948, but Senator Bricker was not his running mate. Dewey chose instead Governor Earl Warren of California in the hope that the 1948 ticket would carry California, which the Dewey-Bricker ticket had failed to do. The Dewey-Warren ticket also lost California, and the absence of Bricker on the second ticket may have been a factor in Dewey's failure to win Bricker's home state of Ohio again. Bricker campaigned with Warren in 1944 in Sacramento, where Bricker attacked the politics of war-time rationing; then in San Francisco Bricker charged that Roosevelt had packed the U.S. judiciary with liberal jurists hostile to the Constitution. However, even if Dewey had carried both California and Ohio in 1948, the two large states would have been insufficient to elect him president in that second campaign.

Bricker's Senate service is best remembered for his attempts to amend the United States Constitution to limit the President's treaty-making powers (the Bricker Amendment). He was the chairman of the Committee on Interstate and Foreign Commerce during the 83rd Congress.

On July 12, 1947, a former Capitol police officer, William Louis Kaiser, fired shots at Senator Bricker as he boarded the underground subway from the Senate office building to the Capitol. The two shots, fired at close range, narrowly missed their target. Kaiser stated he was "trying to refresh" Bricker's memory. Kaiser had served on the police force as a protege of Bricker's predecessor in the Senate and had complained of losing substantial money on Columbus real estate. An investigation concluded that Kaiser may have fired blanks or else purposely missed Bricker.

Bricker intervened in the 1956 deportation of Dr. Peter Tchen, father of Tina Tchen, former Time's Up CEO and Chief of Staff to Michelle Obama, by introducing a bill to grant him permanent residency.

Bricker voted in favor of the Civil Rights Act of 1957. In 1958, former U.S. representative Stephen M. Young ran against Bricker. Bricker seemed invincible, but Young capitalized on widespread public opposition to the proposed "right to work" amendment to Ohio's constitution, which Bricker had endorsed. Few thought that Young, 69 at the time, could win; even members of his own party had doubts, particularly Ohio's other senator, Democrat Frank J. Lausche. In an upset amid a national Democratic trend, Young defeated Bricker 52% to 48%. Bricker then retired from public life.

== Professional life and death ==
In 1945, Bricker founded the Columbus law firm Bricker & Eckler. The firm merged with other Columbus-based law firm, Graydon Head & Ritchey and later with Wyatt, Tarrant & Combs to form Bricker Graydon Wyatt. As of 2026, the firm has seven offices in Ohio, and additional offices in Kentucky, Tennessee, and Indiana. It is now one of the ten largest firms in the state of Ohio. The firm has maintained an office and conference room in Bricker's honor in its Columbus office featuring memorabilia from Bricker's political career.

He was married to Harriet Day.

After leaving the Senate, John Bricker resumed the practice of law. He died in Columbus on March 22, 1986, at the age of 92 and is interred at Green Lawn Cemetery.

Legal offices
Preceded by Gilbert Bettman	Attorney General of Ohio; 1933–1937	Succeeded by Herbert S. Duffy
Party political offices
Preceded by Clarence J. Brown	Republican nominee for Governor of Ohio; 1936, 1938, 1940, 1942	Succeeded by James Garfield Stewart
Preceded by Charles L. McNary	Republican nominee for Vice President of the United States; 1944	Succeeded by Earl Warren
Preceded by Kingsley A. Taft	Republican nominee for U.S. Senator from Ohio (Class 1); 1946, 1952, 1958	Succeeded by Robert Taft Jr.
Political offices
Preceded by Martin L. Davey	Governor of Ohio; 1939–1945	Succeeded by Frank Lausche
U.S. Senate
Preceded by Kingsley A. Taft	U.S. Senator (Class 1) from Ohio; 1947–1959; Served alongside: Robert Taft, Thomas A. Burke, George H. Bender, Frank Lausche	Succeeded by Stephen M. Young
Preceded by Charles W. Tobey	Chair of the Senate Commerce Committee; 1953–1955	Succeeded by Warren Magnuson
Preceded by Edwin C. Johnson	Ranking Member of the Senate Commerce Committee; 1955–1959	Succeeded by Andrew Frank Schoeppel
