= 1853 Ohio gubernatorial election =

- October 11, 1853
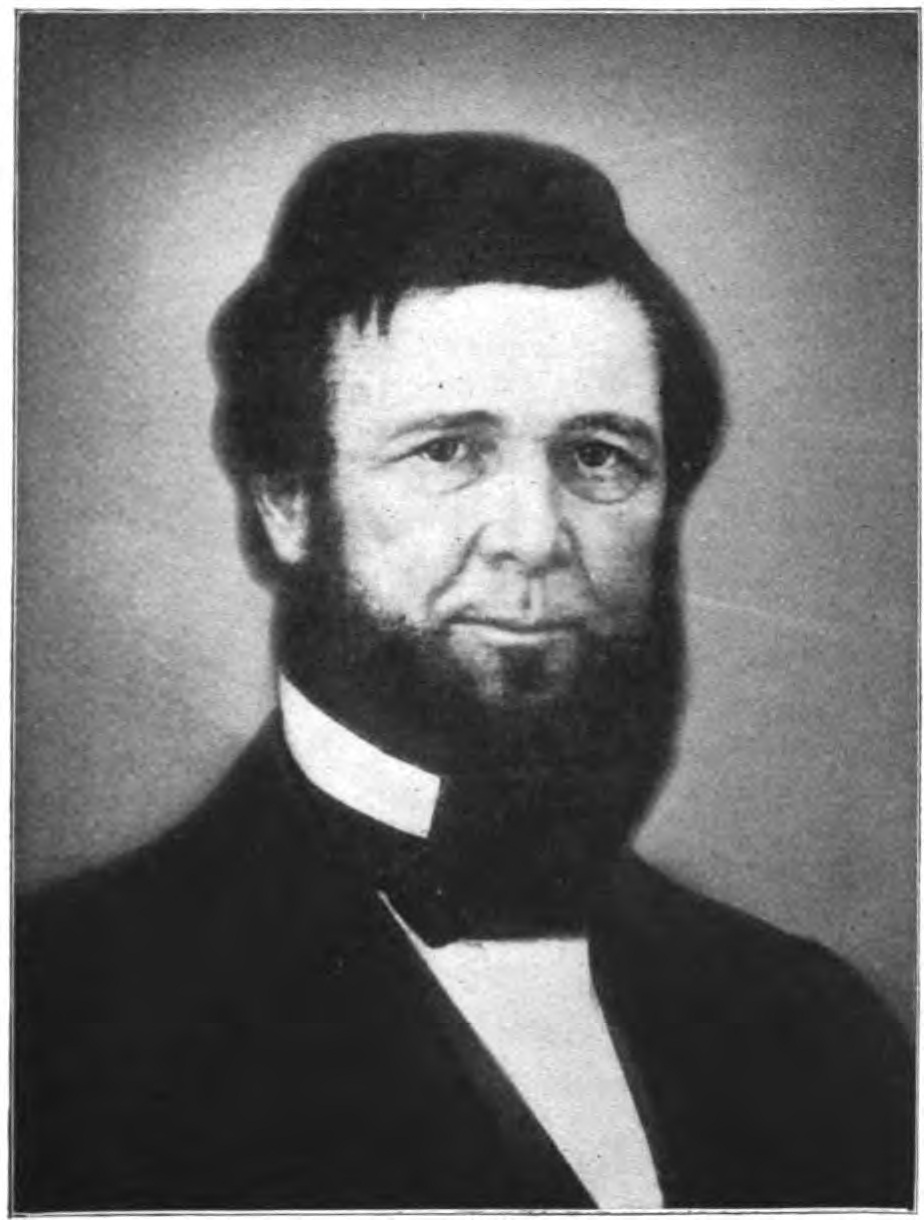

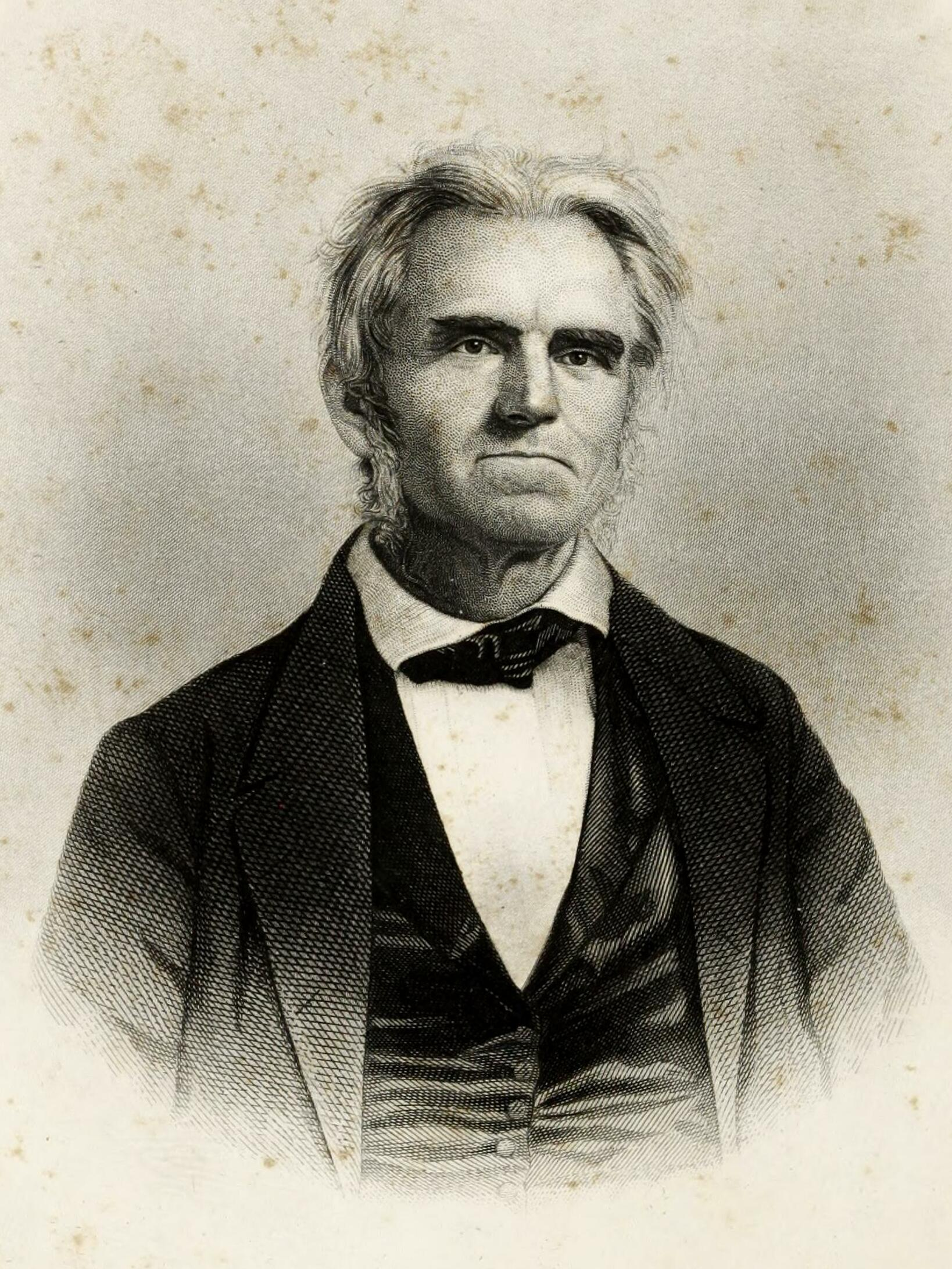
Nominee	William Medill	Nelson Barrere	Samuel Lewis
Party	Democratic	Whig	Free Soil
Popular vote	147,663	85,857	50,346
Percentage	52.01%	30.24%	17.73%
- County results Medill: 30–40% 40–50% 50–60% 60–70% 70–80% 80–90% Barrere: 40–50% 50–60% Lewis: 30–40% 40–50% 50–60%
Governor before election
William Medill (acting)
Democratic
Elected Governor
William Medill
Democratic

The 1853 Ohio gubernatorial election was held on October 11, 1853.

Incumbent Democratic Governor William Medill defeated Whig nominee Nelson Barrere and Free Soil nominee Samuel Lewis.

== General election ==
=== Candidates ===
- Nelson Barrere, former U.S. Representative from Hillsboro (Whig)
- Samuel Lewis, former state superintendent of common schools and candidate for governor in 1846 and 1851 (Free Soil)
- William Medill, incumbent Governor (Democratic)

=== Results ===
1853 Ohio gubernatorial election (Note: Some sources give Barrere's vote as 85,843. Per Dubin, this is the sum of the votes county-by-county, but the total below is that given in the General Assembly.)
Party	Candidate	Votes	%	±%
Democratic	William Medill (incumbent)	147,663	52.01%	
Whig	Nelson Barrere	85,857	30.24%	
Free Soil	Samuel Lewis	50,346	17.73%	
Majority		61,806	21.77%	
Turnout		283,887		
Democratic hold		Swing		
