= 1847 Liberty National Convention =

- 1848 presidential election
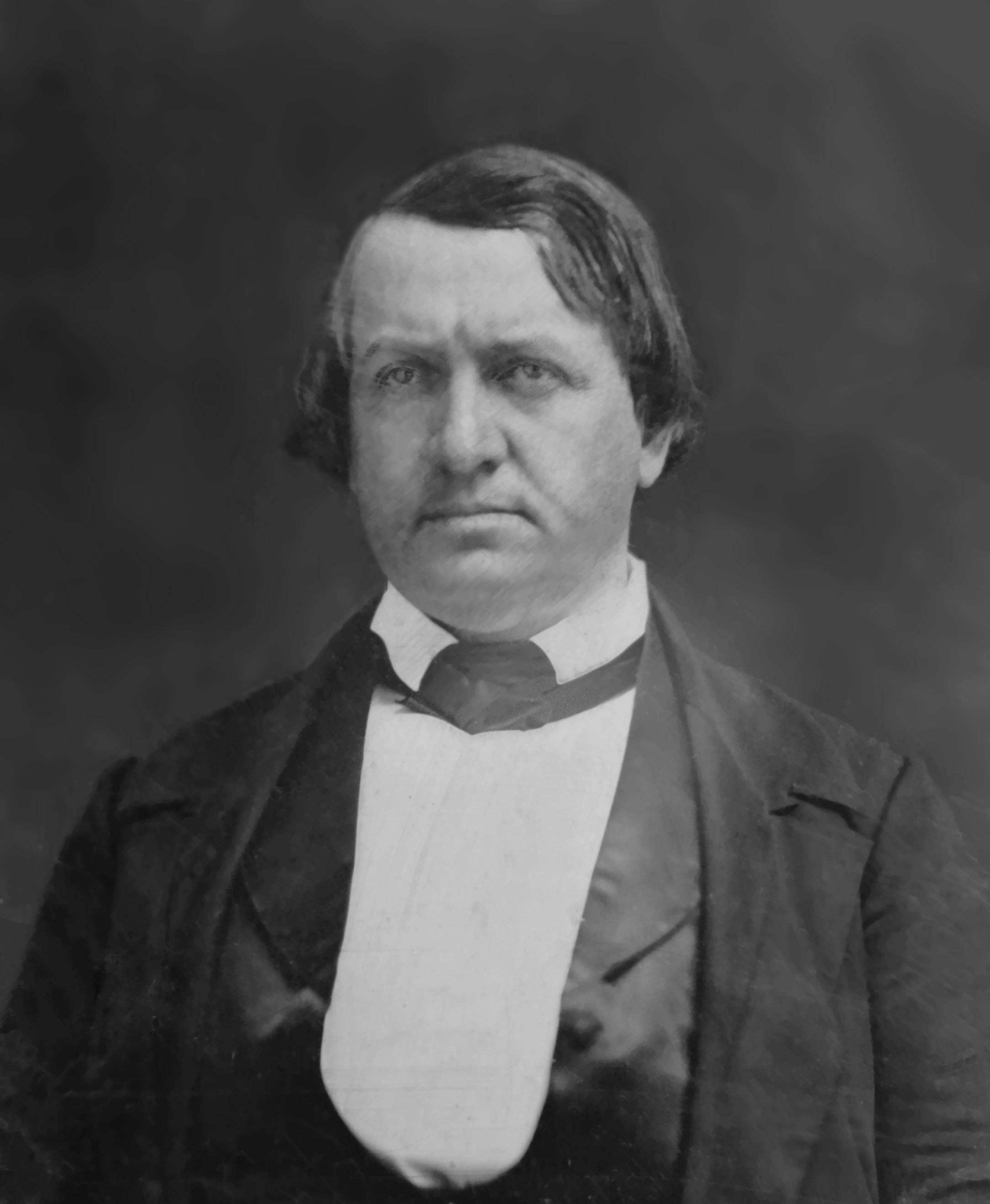
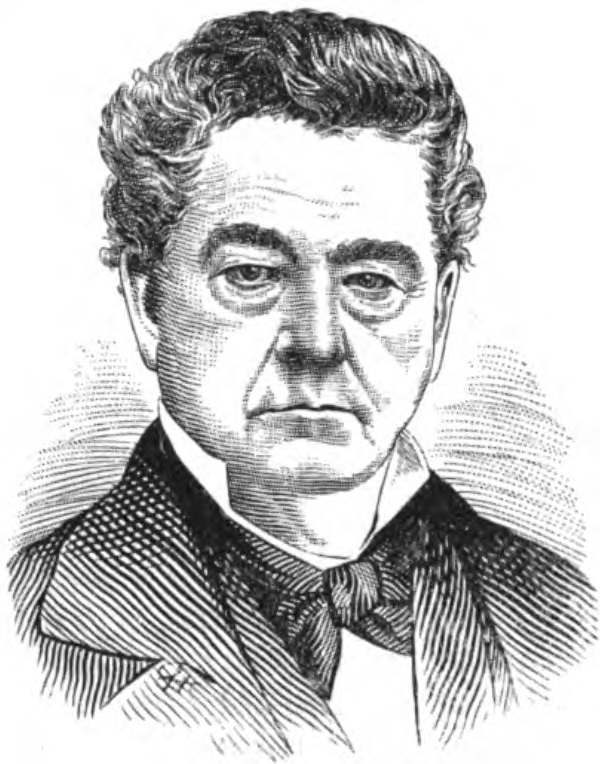
- Nominees (Hale and King)

Convention
- Dates: October 20–21, 1847
- City: Buffalo, New York
- Venue: "Great Tent", erected at a corner of Eagle & Ellicott Streets
- Chair: Samuel Lewis

Candidates
- Presidential nominee: John P. Hale of New Hampshire
- Vice-presidential nominee: Leicester King of Ohio
- Results (president): J. Hale: 103; G. Smith: 44; S. Lewis: 4 Others: 4
- Results (vice president): L. King: 72 (1st ballot), 82 (2nd bal.); O. Lovejoy: 76 (1st bal.), 67 (2nd bal.); F. LeMoyne: 4 (1st bal.), 5 (2nd bal,); I. Codding: 1 (1st bal,), 4 (2nd bal.); Others: 5 (1st bal.), 2 (2nd bal.)
- Ballots: 2

The 1847 Liberty National Convention was held October 20–21, 1847, in Buffalo, New York. It saw the Liberty Party nominate John P. Hale for president and Leicester King for vice president in the 1848 United States presidential election. The party later rescinded its ticket (with Hale and King withdrawing from the election), with the party instead backing the ticket nominated at the 1848 Free Soil National Convention.

== Logistics ==
The Liberty Party held their national convention at Buffalo, New York October 20–21, 1847. The convention was reported to have had sizable attendance. It took place inside of the so-called "Great Tent", which was erected for the convention at a corner of Eagle & Ellicott Streets.

=== Scheduling and site selection ===
By letters to the chairman of the national party, nine members of the national committee voted on their preference of when and where the party's convention should be held. Seven were in favor of a convention in the American autumn of 1847 (late 1847), while two preferred a convention in the spring of 1848 (early 1848). For a location, four favored Buffalo (in the state of New York), three favored Cleveland (in the state of Ohio), one favored Pittsburgh (in the state Pennsylvania), while one other expressed no particular preference for location. Because a location needed majority support to be selected, the chair cast a deadlock-breaking vote in support of Buffalo as a location.

=== Delegate selection ===
States were allocated a specific number of delegates, to be selected at state and district conventions.

Among the state conventions called to select delegates were:

- Connecticut on September 15 in Meriden
- Indiana: September 8 in Salem
- Massachusetts on September 8 in Worcester
- New Hampshire on September 30 at the Town Hall Concord
- New York on September 29 in Syracuse
- Ohio separate county conventions, including one in September in Logan County
- Pennsylvania on September 29 and 30 in New Castle
- Rhode Island on October 6 at Mechanics Hall in Providence

=== Convention officers ===
Appointed as officers of the convention were:

- President of convention: Samuel Lewis of Ohio
- Secretaries: Sanley Matthews, Austin Willey, and others

== Nominations ==
A major deliberation at the convention, was whether the party should proceed with nominating a presidential ticket. Some at the convention argued that the party should postpone its nomination until after the Democratic and Whig nominating conventions in 1848. However, a vote in favor of nominating at the 1847 convention prevailed.

The faction of the Liberty Party led by Salmon P. Chase sought support from disaffected members of the two major parties. In the months preceding the convention, they began to promote John P. Hale as a candidate capable of uniting a broad coalition of Liberty men, Conscience Whigs, and Independent Democrats on the basis of opposition to slavery's extension. A contingent of Liberty leaders including Joshua Leavitt, Henry B. Stanton, and John Greenleaf Whittier met with Hale in Boston in July 1847 to encourage him to make a public declaration of his candidacy. Hale, however, was concerned that accepting the party's nomination would weaken his position in the Senate and asked for the convention to be delayed until the following spring. When the Chase faction failed to secure the delay of the convention, Hale wrote to Lewis Tappan requesting that his name not be placed in nomination at the Buffalo convention, but Tappan ignored this request.

Acceptance of Hale's candidacy required a significant shift in the party's attitude and approach to politics. Hale had earned the high regard of many Liberty Party voters for his protests against the gag rule and his opposition to the annexation of Texas; however, he was not a member of the Liberty Party, had never belonged to any antislavery society, and stopped short of calling for the immediate abolition of slavery, instead adopting a policy of non-extension. Chase and his allies worked tirelessly throughout the summer in support of Hale's candidacy; their efforts were rewarded, as Hale was nominated overwhelmingly by the national convention, with 103 votes to 44 for Smith. Former Ohio Supreme Court Justice Leicester King was nominated for vice president.

The Liberty League had already nominated Gerrit Smith for president at its own convention, held in June at Macedon, New York. A deputization representing the Liberty League was present at the Liberty Party's convention, aiming to secure Smith the party's nomination and see the party adopt a platform incorporating the resolutions adopted at their own Macedon convention.

The convention ultimately nominated Hale, with Leicester King being nominated for vice president. Hale was a former Democrat, while King was a former Whig.

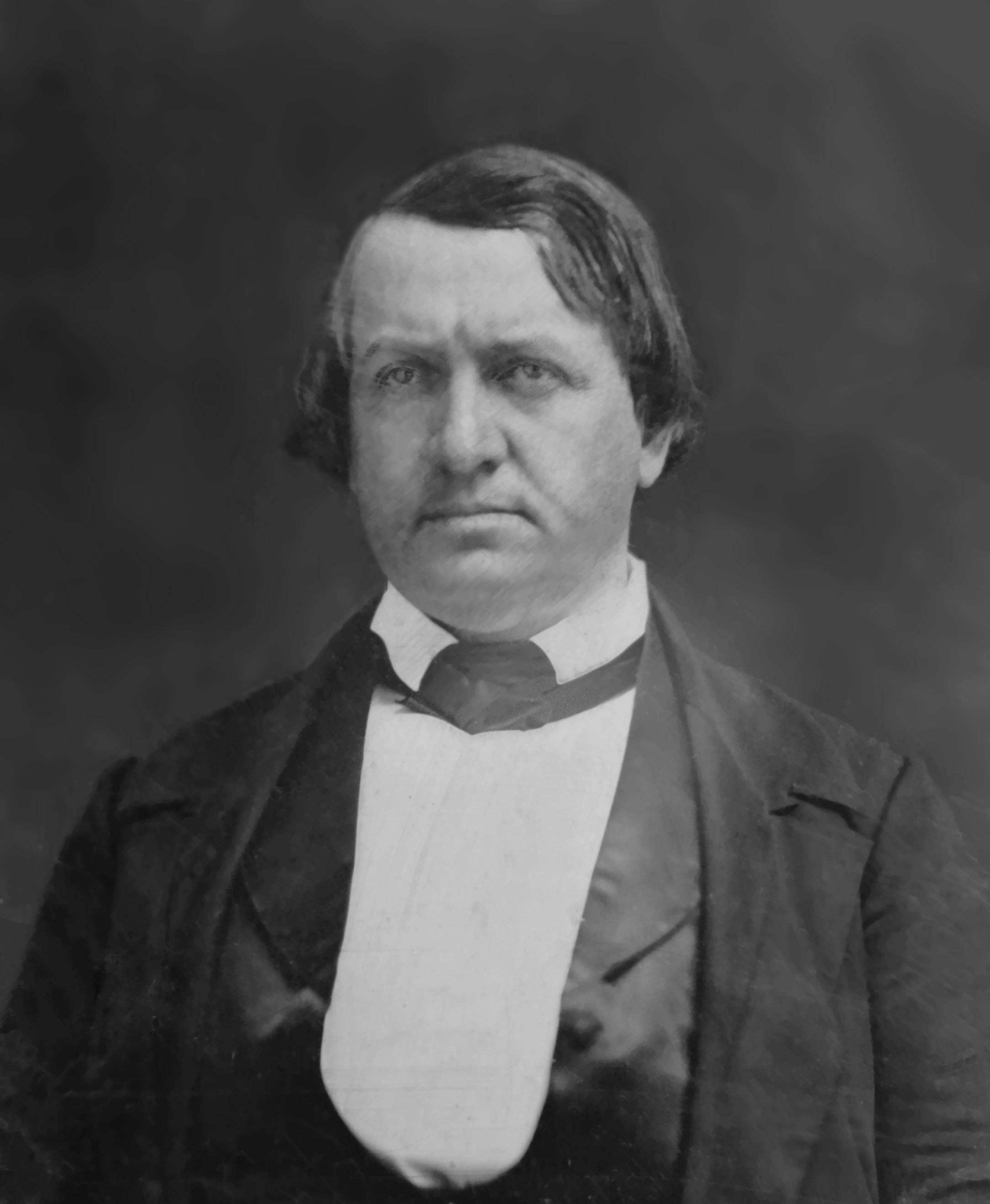
Senator
John P. Hale
of New Hampshire

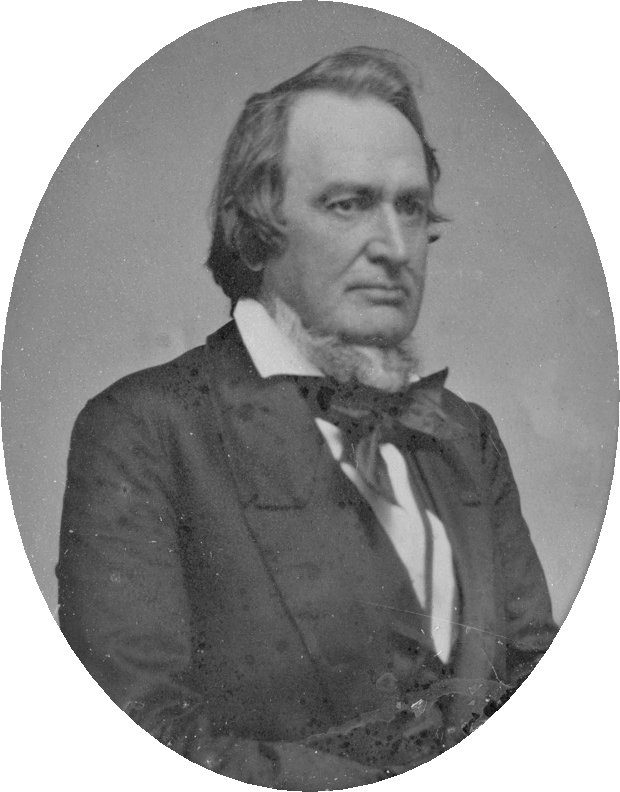
Gerrit Smith
of New York

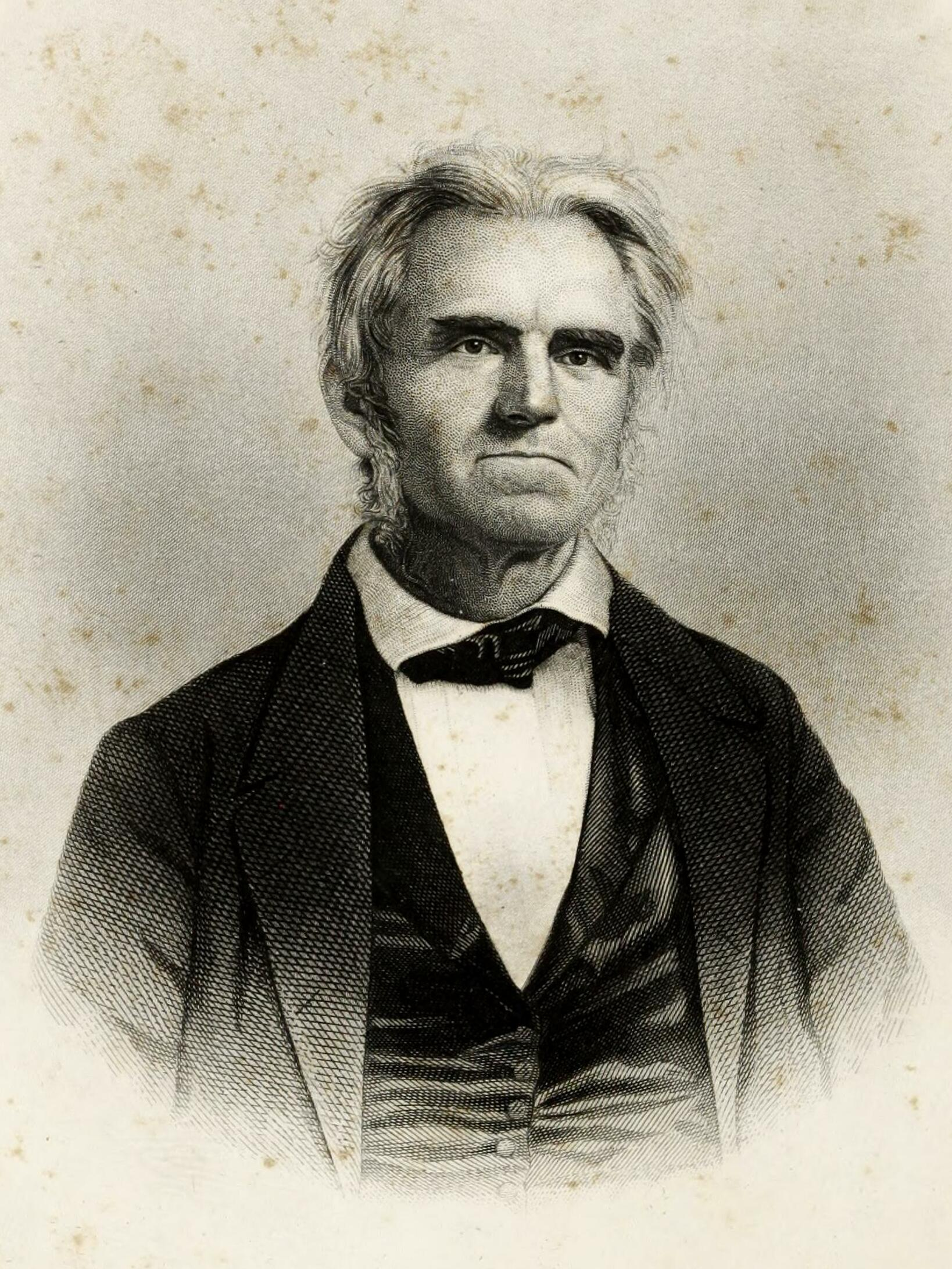
Former State Superintendent of Common Schools
Samuel Lewis
of Ohio

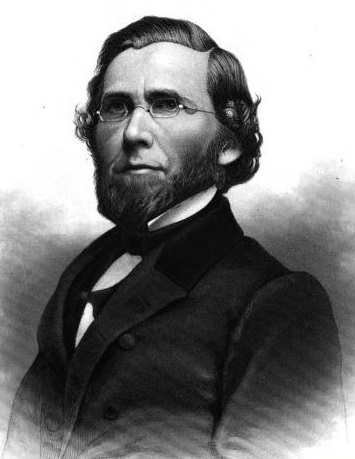
Reverend
Samuel C. Fessenden
of Maine

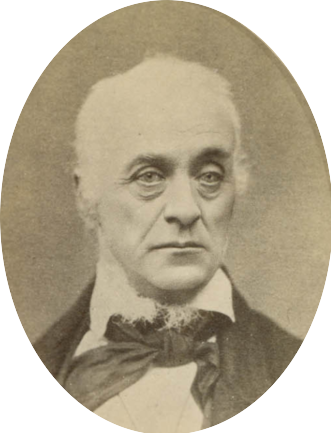
William Goodell
of New York

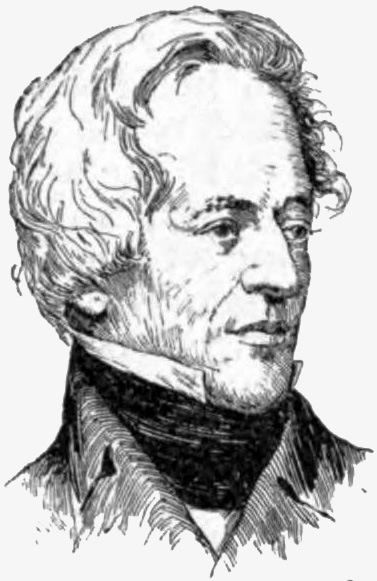
Former Judge of Common Pleas
William Jay
of New York

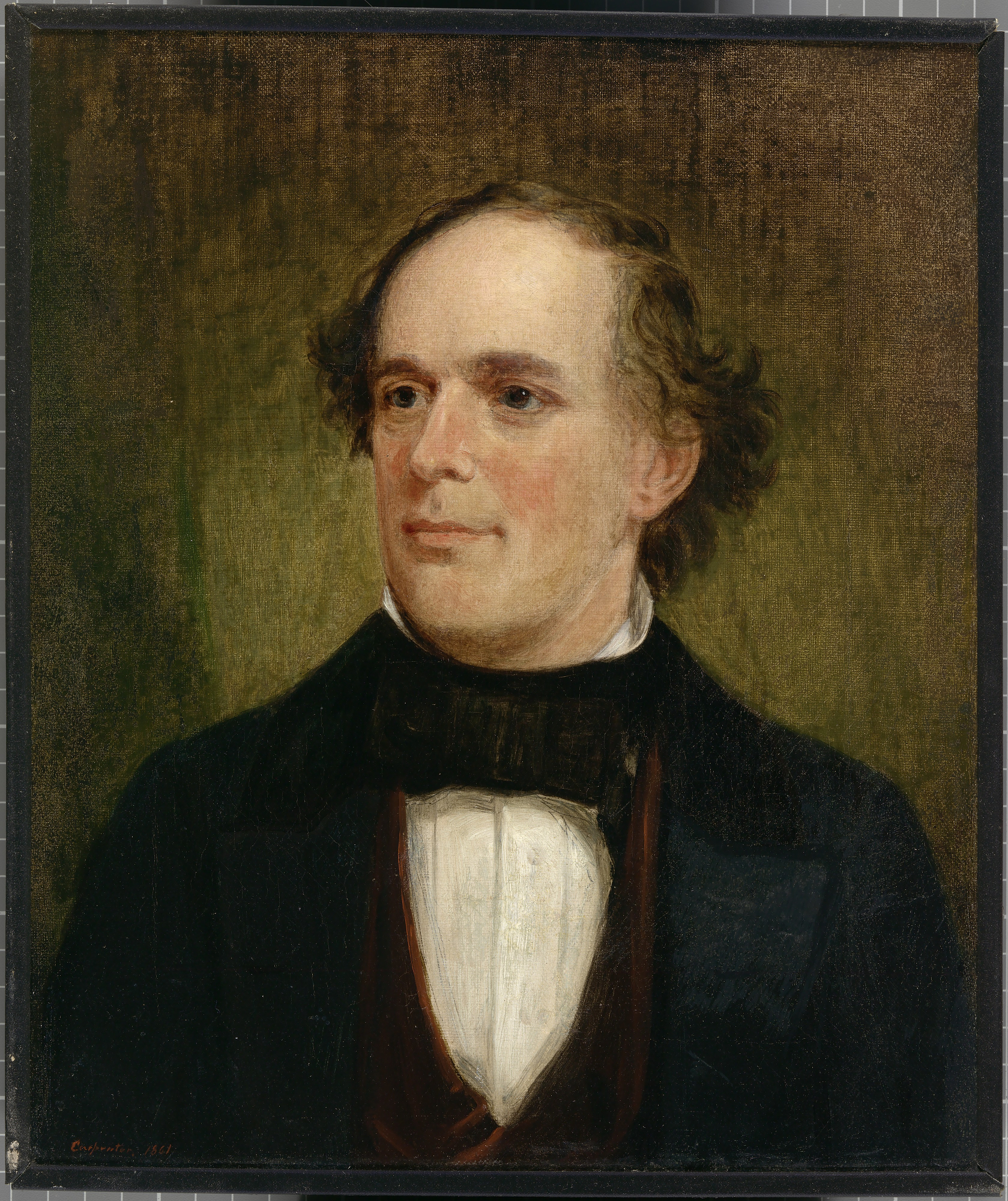
Former City Councilor
Salmon P. Chase
of Ohio

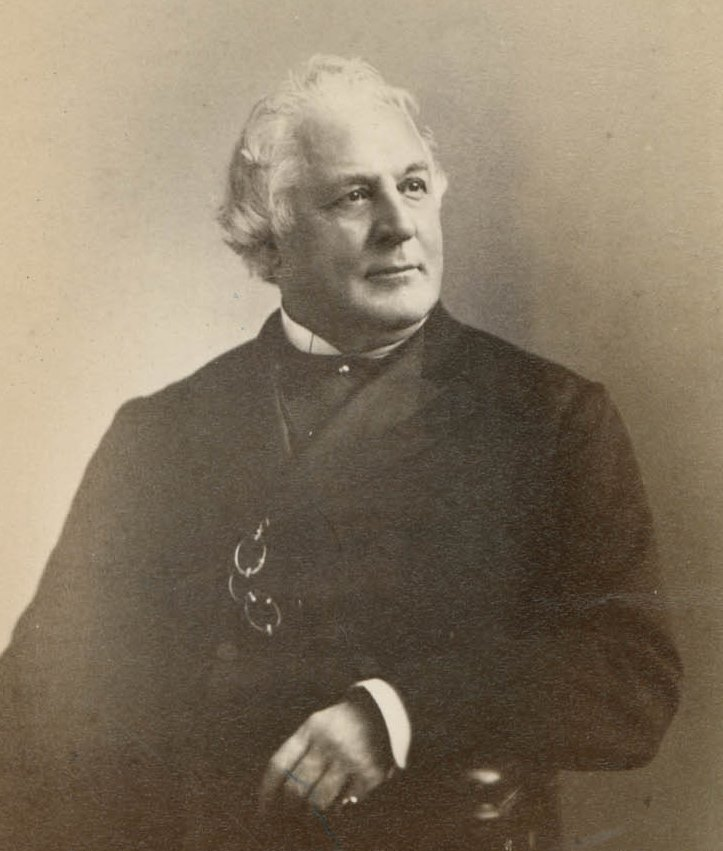
John Jay
of New York

Presidential ballot		Vice presidential ballot		
	1st		1st	2nd
John P. Hale	103	Owen Lovejoy	76	67
Gerrit Smith	44	Leicester King	72	82
Samuel Lewis	4	Francis Julius LeMoyne	4	5
Samuel C. Fessenden	3	William L. Chaplin	1	0
William Goodell	1	Salmon P. Chase	1	0
William Jay	1	Ichabod Codding	1	4
Salmon P. Chase	1	Samuel C. Fessenden	1	0
John Jay	1	Gerrit Smith	1	0
		Alvan Stewart	1	2

== Aftermath ==
Before the presidential election, the majority of the Liberty Party abandoned the ticket nominated at its own convention, and instead supported joining forces with the Free Soil Party and the ticket nominated at the Free Soil convention.

The Liberty League forces split from the Liberty Party after their failure to influence the nomination and platform. A breakaway faction of the Liberty Party did not join forces with the Free Soil Party, and instead organized the National Liberty convention which nominated the same ticket as the Liberty League.
