= 1848 convention =

1848 convention may refer to:

- The Seneca Falls Convention
- The Rochester Women's Rights Convention of 1848
- The 1848 Democratic National Convention
- The 1848 Whig National Convention
- The 1848 Free Soil & Liberty national Conventions
- The Industrial Congress National Convention, 1848
- The 1848 Constitutional Convention of Seneca People that established the Seneca Nation of New York
- The Prague Slavic Congress, 1848
- The 1848 founding convention of the Free Soil Party
- The 1848 International Peace Congress in Brussels
