= 1846 Ohio gubernatorial election =

- October 13, 1846
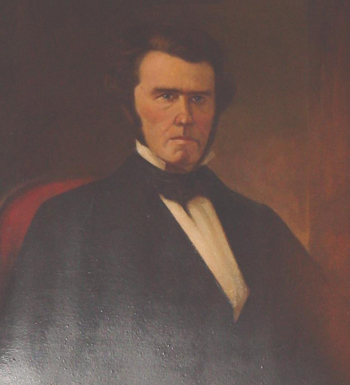

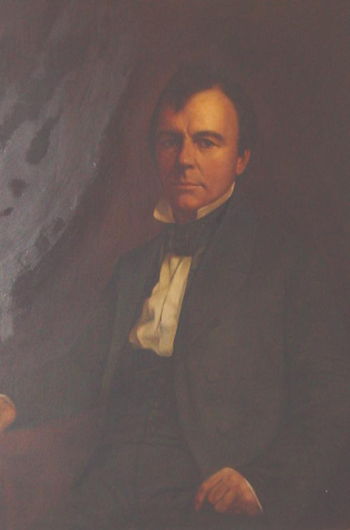
Nominee	William Bebb	David Tod
Party	Whig	Democratic
Popular vote	118,869	116,484
Percentage	48.28%	47.31%
- Election results by county Bebb: 40–50% 50–60% 60–70% Tod: 40–50% 50–60% 60–70% 80–90% No Data/Vote
Governor before election
Mordecai Bartley
Whig
Elected Governor
William Bebb
Whig

The 1846 Ohio gubernatorial election was held on October 13, 1846, in order to elect the Governor of Ohio. Whig nominee William Bebb defeated Democratic nominee David Tod and Liberty nominee Samuel Lewis.

== General election ==
On election day, October 13, 1846, Whig nominee William Bebb won the election by a margin of 2,385 votes against his foremost opponent Democratic nominee David Tod, thereby retaining Whig control over the office of Governor. Bebb was sworn in as the 19th Governor of Ohio on December 12, 1846.

=== Results ===
Ohio gubernatorial election, 1846
Party	Candidate	Votes	%
Whig	William Bebb	118,869	48.28%
Democratic	David Tod	116,484	47.31%
Liberty	Samuel Lewis	10,797	4.39%
	Scattering	46	0.02%
Total votes		246,196	100.00%
Whig hold			
