= 1851 Ohio gubernatorial election =

- October 14, 1851
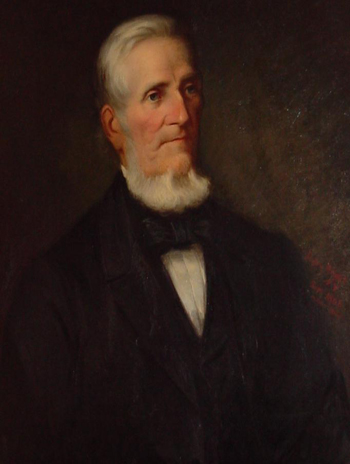

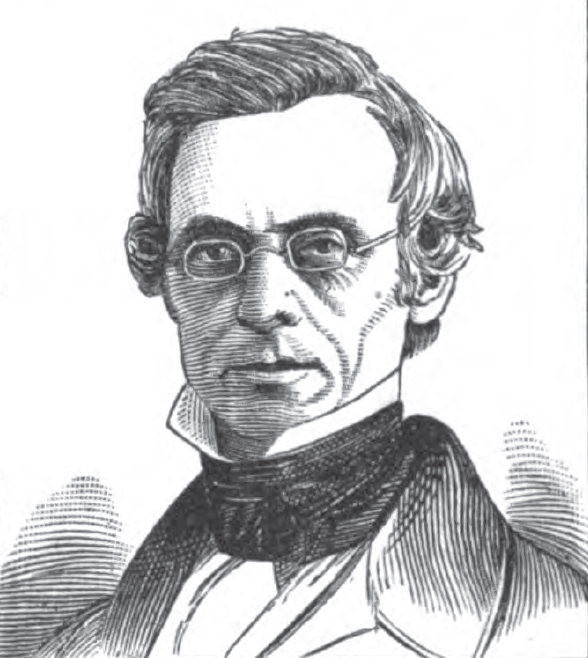

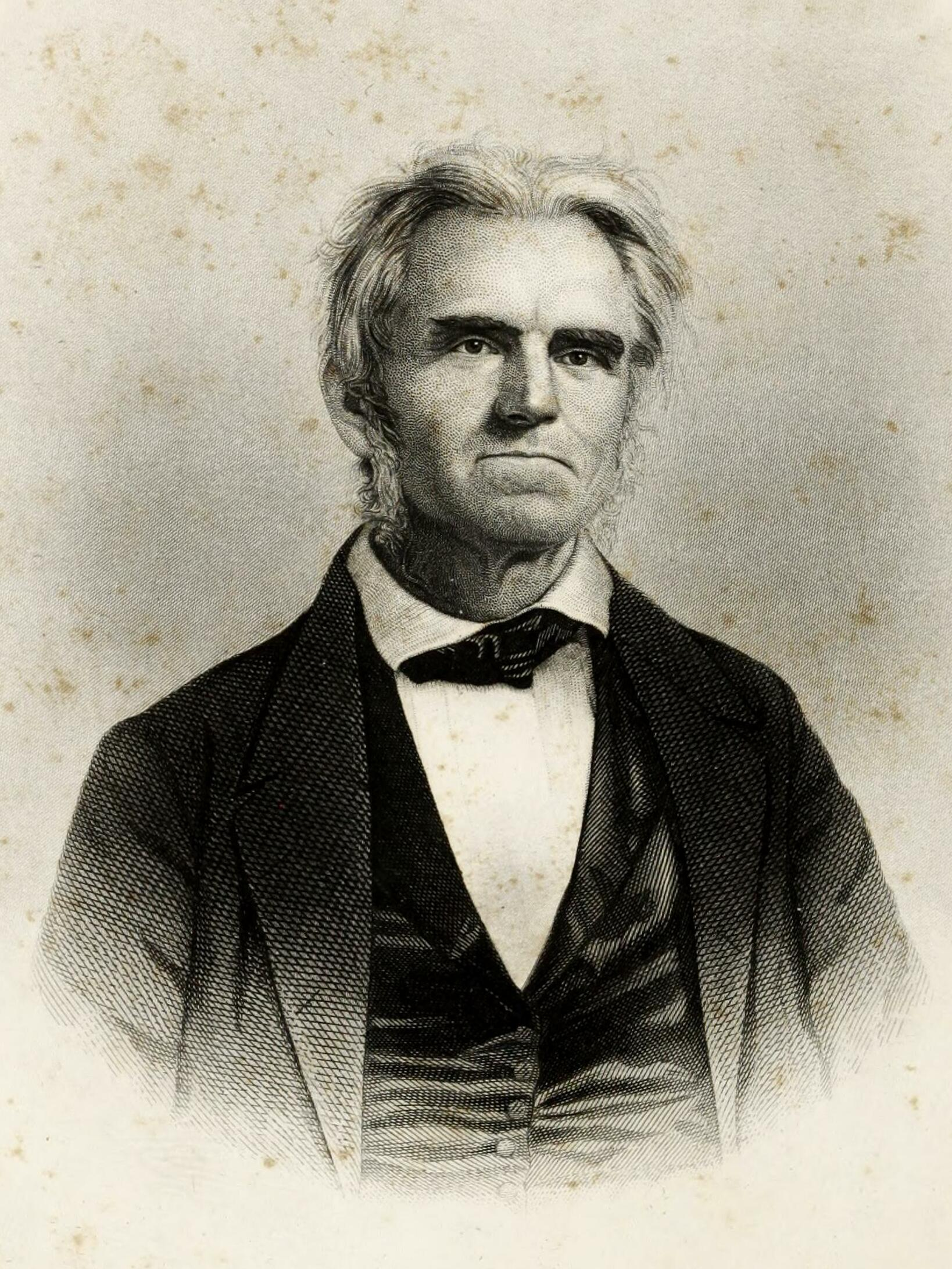
Nominee	Reuben Wood	Samuel F. Vinton	Samuel Lewis
Party	Democratic	Whig	Free Soil
Popular vote	145,654	119,548	16,918
Percentage	51.62%	42.37%	6.00%
- County results Wood: 40–50% 50–60% 60–70% 70–80% 80–90% Vinton: 40–50% 50–60% 60–70% Lewis: 40–50%
Governor before election
Reuben Wood
Democratic
Elected Governor
Reuben Wood
Democratic

The 1851 Ohio gubernatorial election was held on October 14, 1851, in order to elect the governor of Ohio. Incumbent Democratic governor Reuben Wood won re-election against Whig nominee and former member of the U.S. House of Representatives from Ohio's 12th district Samuel F. Vinton and Free Soil nominee Samuel Lewis.

== General election ==
On election day, October 14, 1851, incumbent Democratic governor Reuben Wood won re-election by a margin of 26,106 votes against his foremost opponent Whig nominee Samuel F. Vinton, thereby retaining Democratic control over the office of governor. Wood was sworn in for his second term on January 12, 1852.

=== Results ===
Ohio gubernatorial election, 1851
Party	Candidate	Votes	%
Democratic	Reuben Wood (incumbent)	145,654	51.62%
Whig	Samuel F. Vinton	119,548	42.37%
Free Soil	Samuel Lewis	16,918	6.00%
	Scattering	62	0.01%
Total votes		282,182	100.00%
Democratic hold			
