= Aaron Harlan =

American politician

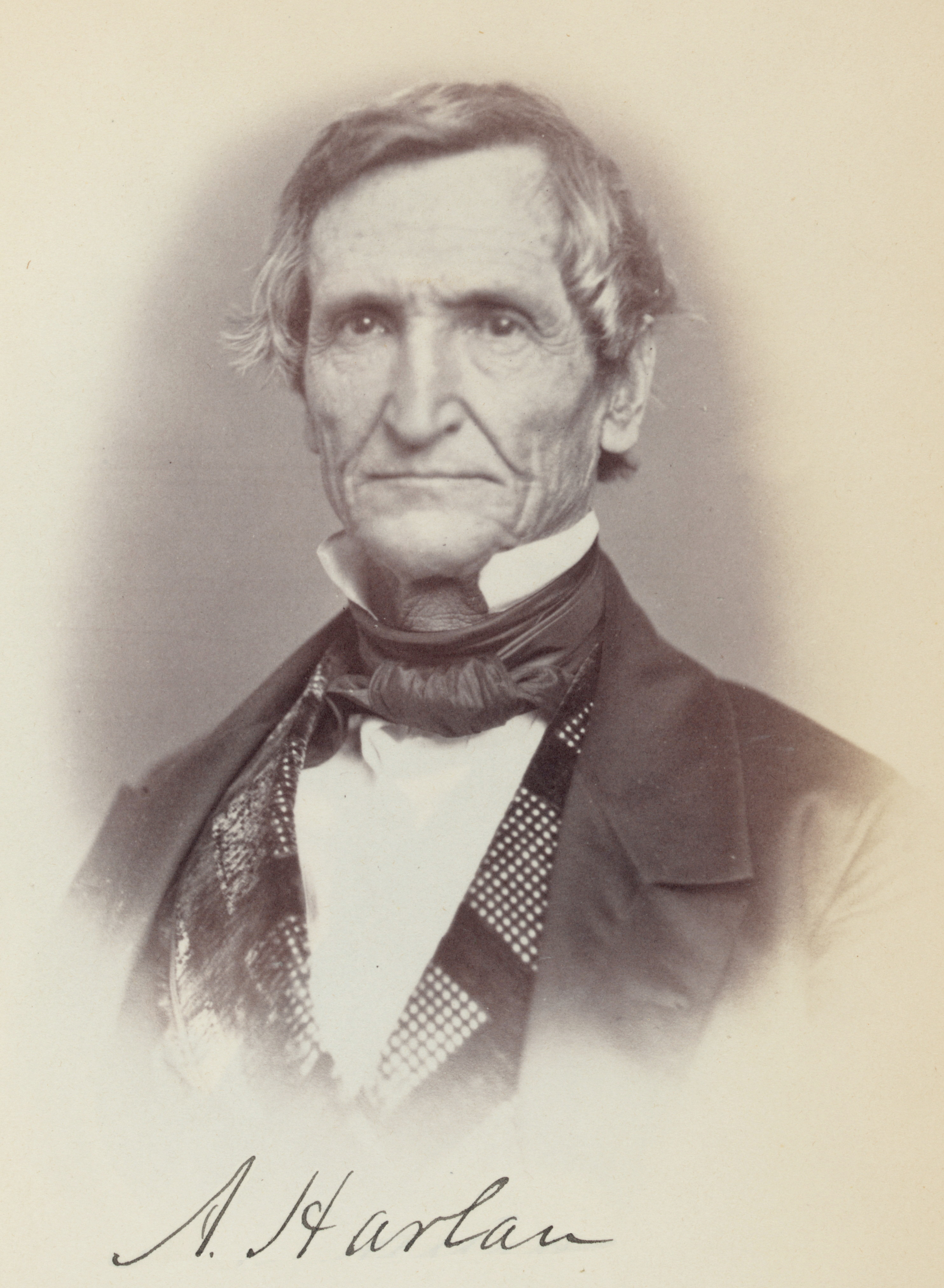
- in 35th Congress

Member of the U.S. House of Representatives from Ohio's 7th district
- In office March 4, 1853 – March 4, 1859
- Preceded by: Nelson Barrere
- Succeeded by: Thomas Corwin

Member of the Ohio House of Representatives from the Greene County district
- In office December 3, 1832 – December 1, 1833
- Preceded by: Simeon Dunn
- Succeeded by: J. A. Scott

Member of the Ohio Senate from the Fayette, Madison & Greene Counties district
- In office December 3, 1838 – December 6, 1840
- Preceded by: John Arbuckle
- Succeeded by: inactive

Member of the Ohio Senate from the Clinton, Greene & Warren Counties district
- In office December 3, 1849 – December 1, 1850
- Preceded by: Franklin Corwin
- Succeeded by: David Linton

Personal details
- Born: September 8, 1802 Warren County, Ohio
- Died: January 8, 1868 (aged 65) San Francisco, California, U.S.
- Resting place: Laurel Hill Cemetery
- Party: Whig
- Other political affiliations: Anti-Nebraska, Republican

Aaron Harlan (September 8, 1802 – January 8, 1868) was a 19th-century American lawyer and politician who served three terms as a U.S. representative from Ohio from 1853 to 1859. He was a cousin of Andrew Jackson Harlan.

== Biography ==
Born in Warren County, Ohio, Harlan attended a public school and later attended a law school. He was admitted to the bar and began practice in Xenia, Ohio, in 1825.

=== Early political career ===
He served as member of the Ohio House of Representatives in 1832 and 1833, and he served in the Ohio Senate in 1838, 1839, and 1849. He moved to a farm near Yellow Springs, Ohio in 1841 and continued the practice of law.

He was a Presidential elector in 1844 for Clay/Frelinghuysen. He served as delegate to the State constitutional convention in 1850. He served as member of the board of trustees of Antioch College in 1852.

=== Congress ===
Harlan was elected as a Whig to the Thirty-third Congress, reelected as an Anti-Nebraska candidate to the Thirty-fourth Congress, and elected as a Republican to the Thirty-fifth Congresses (March 4, 1853 – March 4, 1859).

He was an unsuccessful candidate for reelection in 1858, to the Thirty-sixth Congress and in 1861 to fill a vacancy in the Thirty-seventh Congress.

=== Later career and death ===
He resumed the practice of law and engaged in agricultural pursuits near Yellow Springs. He served as lieutenant colonel of the Ninety-fourth Regiment of Minutemen of Ohio in 1862.

Harlan moved to San Francisco, California, in 1864 and resided there until his death on January 8, 1868. He was interred in Laurel Hill Cemetery.

== Sources ==
- United States Congress. "Aaron Harlan (id: H000207)". Biographical Directory of the United States Congress.
- Taylor, William Alexander; Taylor, Aubrey Clarence (1899). Ohio statesmen and annals of progress: from the year 1788 to the year 1900 …. Vol. 1. State of Ohio. p. 255.

U.S. House of Representatives
Preceded by Nelson Barrere	Member of the U.S. House of Representatives from Ohio's 7th congressional district 1853-1859	Succeeded by Thomas Corwin
