= John P. Hale =

American politician (1806-1873)

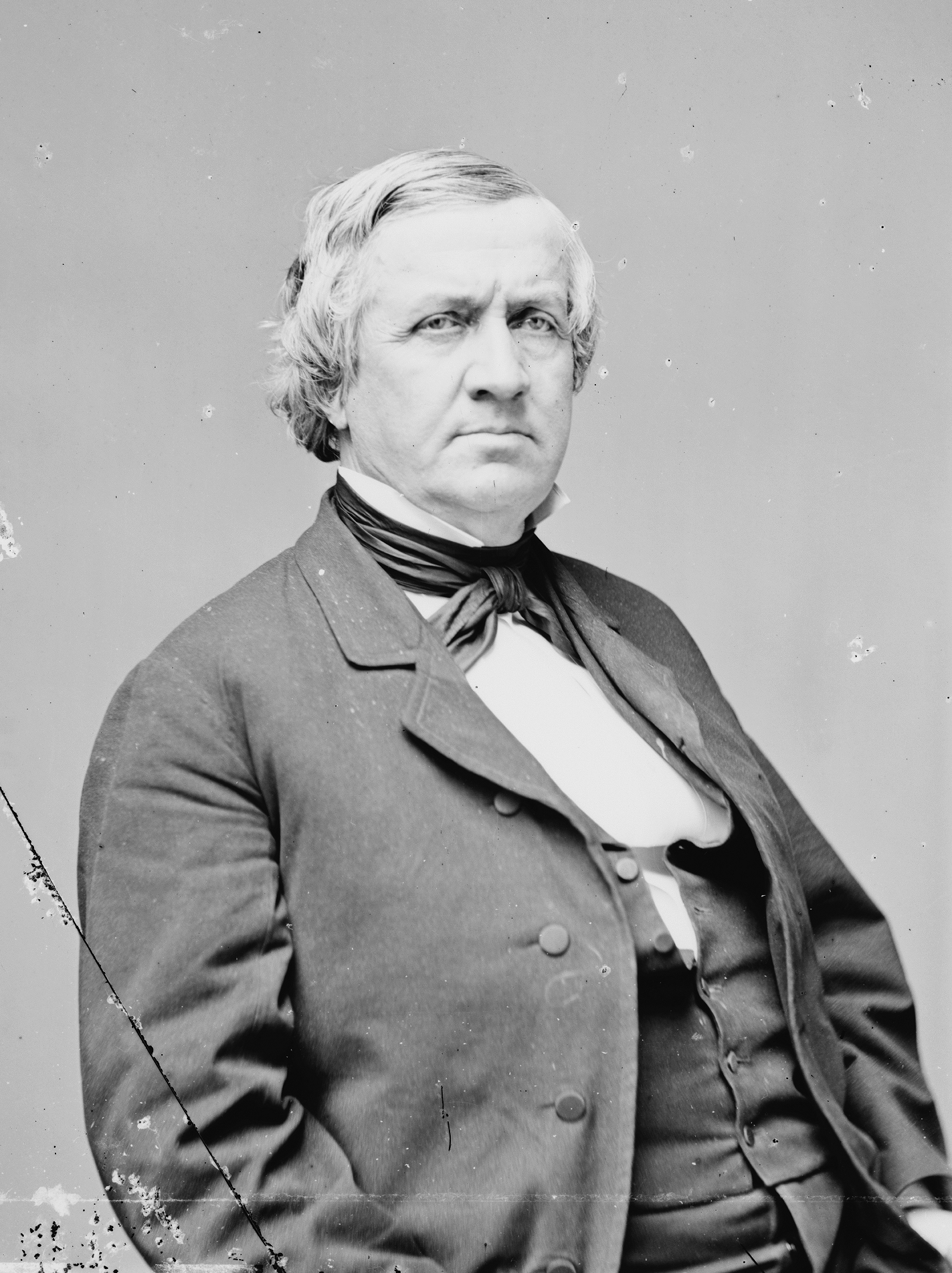
- Portrait, c. 1860–1865

18th United States Minister to Spain
- In office September 30, 1865 – July 29, 1869
- President: Andrew Johnson; Ulysses S. Grant
- Preceded by: Gustav Koerner
- Succeeded by: Daniel Sickles

Chairman of the Senate Republican Conference
- In office 1859 – December 1862
- Preceded by: Position established
- Succeeded by: Henry B. Anthony

United States Senator from New Hampshire
- In office July 30, 1855 – March 3, 1865
- Preceded by: Jared W. Williams
- Succeeded by: Aaron H. Cragin
- In office March 4, 1847 – March 3, 1853
- Preceded by: Joseph Cilley
- Succeeded by: Charles G. Atherton

Member of the U.S. House of Representatives from New Hampshire's at-large district
- In office March 4, 1843 – March 3, 1845; Seat 4
- Preceded by: Ira Eastman
- Succeeded by: Seat abolished

Personal details
- Born: John Parker Hale; March 31, 1806 Rochester, New Hampshire, U.S.
- Died: November 19, 1873 (aged 67) Dover, New Hampshire, U.S.
- Party: Democratic (Before 1847); Liberty (1847–1848); Free Soil (1848–1854); Opposition (1854–1855); Republican (1855–1873)
- Spouse: Lucy Hill Lambert
- Education: Bowdoin College (BA)

John Parker Hale (March 31, 1806 – November 19, 1873) was an American politician and lawyer from New Hampshire. He served in the United States House of Representatives from 1843 to 1845 and in the United States Senate from 1847 to 1853 and again from 1855 to 1865. He began his congressional career as a Democrat, but helped establish the anti-slavery Free Soil Party and eventually joined the Republican Party.

Born in Rochester, New Hampshire, Hale established a legal practice in Dover, New Hampshire after graduating from Bowdoin College. Hale won election to the New Hampshire House of Representatives in 1832 and served as the United States Attorney for New Hampshire under President Andrew Jackson and President Martin Van Buren. He won election to the United States House of Representatives in 1842 but was denied the party's nomination in 1844 due to his opposition to the annexation of Texas. After losing his seat, he continued to campaign against slavery and won election to the Senate in 1846 as an Independent Democrat. In the Senate, he strongly opposed the Mexican–American War and continued to speak against slavery.

Hale helped establish the anti-slavery Free Soil Party. At the 1847 Liberty National Convention, he was selected as its nominee for president in the 1848 election; but after the 1848 Free Soil Convention instead nominated former President Van Buren, he withdrew in support of the Free Soil ticket. He won the party's presidential nomination in 1852, receiving 4.9% of the popular vote in the general election. After the passage of the Kansas–Nebraska Act, Hale joined the nascent Republican Party and returned to the Senate. He served until 1865, at which point he accepted an appointment from President Abraham Lincoln to serve as the Minister to Spain. He held that post until he was recalled in April 1869, at which point he retired from public office.

== Early years ==
Hale was born in Rochester, Strafford County, New Hampshire, the son of John Parker Hale and Lydia Clarkson O'Brien. He attended Phillips Exeter Academy and graduated in 1827 from Bowdoin College, where he was a classmate of Franklin Pierce and a prominent member of the Athenian Society, a literary club. He began his law studies in Rochester with Jeremiah H. Woodman and continued them with Daniel M. Christie in Dover. He passed the bar examination in 1830 and practiced law in Dover. He married Lucy Lambert, the daughter of William Thomas Lambert and Abigail Ricker.

== Start of political career ==
In March 1832, Hale was elected to the New Hampshire House of Representatives as a Democrat. In 1834, President Andrew Jackson appointed him as U.S. District Attorney for New Hampshire. This appointment was renewed by President Martin Van Buren in 1838, but in 1841, Hale was removed on party grounds by President John Tyler, a Whig.

Hale was elected as a Democrat to the Twenty-eighth Congress, serving from March 4, 1843, to March 3, 1845. There he spoke out against the gag rule that had been approved by Congress on December 12, 1838. This rule had been created by another New Hampshire representative, Charles G. Atherton and was intended to put a stop to anti-slavery petitions.

== Anti-slavery transition ==
Hale supported the Democratic candidates James K. Polk and George M. Dallas in the 1844 presidential election, and was renominated for his congressional seat without opposition. Before the congressional election, Texas annexation was adopted by the Democratic Party as part of its platform. In December 1844 the New Hampshire Legislature passed resolutions instructing its senators and congressmen to favor Texas annexation. Instead, Hale made a public statement opposing annexation on anti-slavery grounds.

The Democratic state convention was then reassembled in Concord under Pierce's leadership for the purpose of stripping Hale of his congressional nomination. The reassembled convention branded him a traitor to the party, and in February 1845 his name was stricken from the Democratic ticket. In the subsequent election, Hale ran as an independent. Hale, the replacement Democratic candidate, and the Whig candidate failed to obtain a majority, so the district was unrepresented.

== Anti-slavery governing coalition ==
In the face of an apparently invincible Democratic majority, Hale set out to win New Hampshire over to the anti-slavery cause. He addressed meetings in every town and village in the state, carrying on a remarkable campaign known as the "Hale Storm of 1845," which included a June 5, 1845 debate between Pierce and Hale at the North Church in Concord. In 1846, Hale was able to use New Hampshire's unusual electoral rules to his advantage. Under the state constitution, candidates for Governor and State Senate required a majority of the vote to win; if no candidate won a majority, the General Court would pick among the top two candidates.

The strong performance of the anti-slavery Free Soil Party resulted in no majority winner in the 1846 gubernatorial election or in seven out of twelve State Senate seats. Accordingly, Hale's coalition of Whigs, Liberty Party members and Independent Democrats were able to join to win control of state government after the election. The coalition selected seven Whig candidates to fill the State Senate vacancies, ensuring coalition control of the chamber. It then elected Whig Anthony Colby as Governor (despite him winning just 32% of the vote to Democrat Jared W. Williams's 48%), Liberty Party member Joseph Cilley to a vacancy in the U.S. Senate, and Hale as Speaker of the State House. When Cilley's term expired in 1847, Hale was elected as his successor.

== United States Senate ==
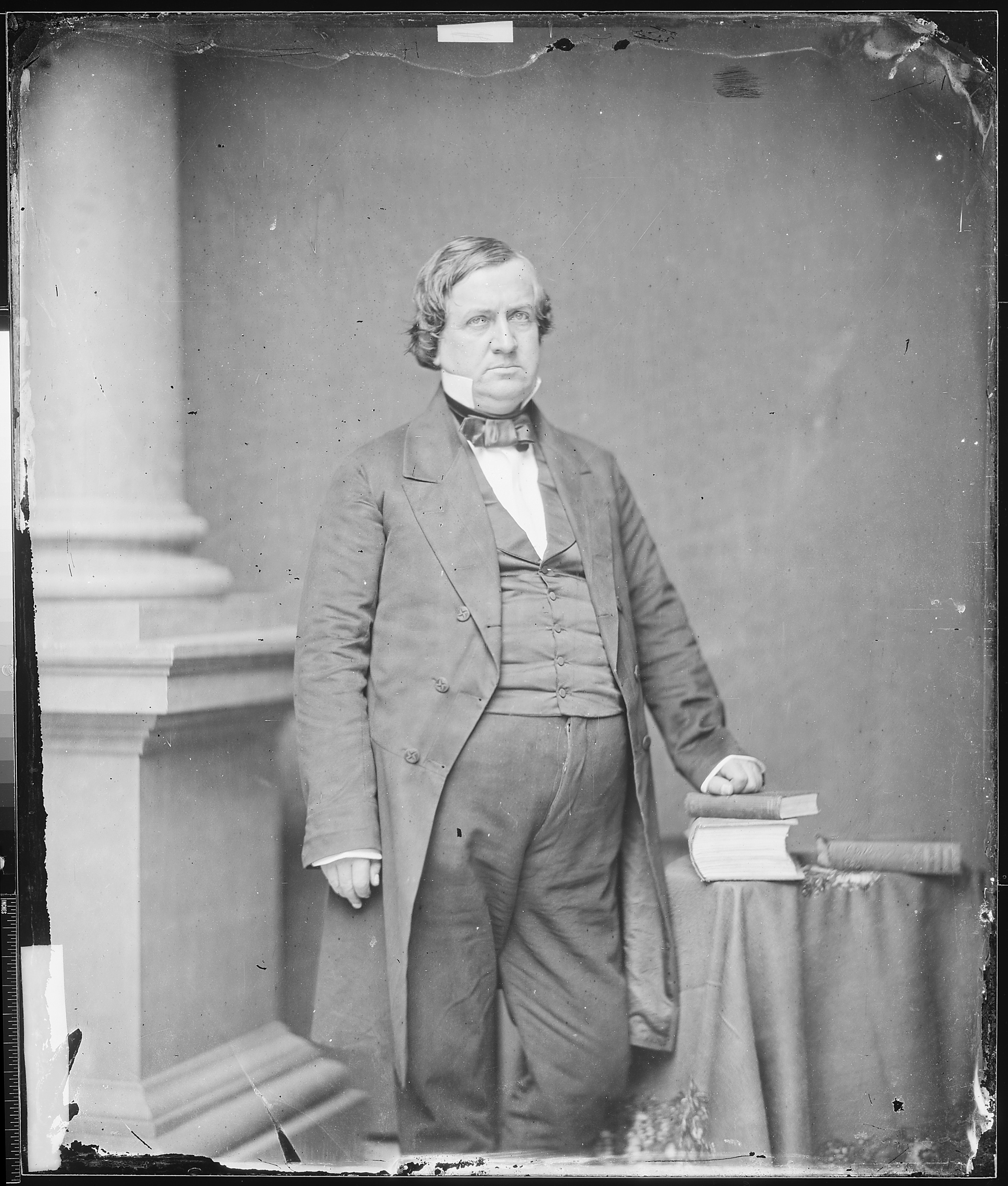
Hale as photographed by Mathew Brady

=== First term as Senator ===
Hale was elected June 9, 1846, as an Independent Democratic Candidate to the United States Senate and served from March 4, 1847, to March 3, 1853, later becoming a Free Soiler.

He was among the strongest opponents of the Mexican–American War in the Senate and is considered "the first U.S. Senator with an openly anti-slavery (or abolitionist) platform".

Hale was the only Senator to vote against the resolution tendering the thanks of Congress to Winfield Scott and Zachary Taylor for their victories in the Mexican–American War. In 1849, he was joined in the Senate by anti-slavery advocates Salmon P. Chase and William H. Seward, and was later joined by Charles Sumner in 1851.

Hale also opposed flogging and the spirit ration in the United States Navy, and secured the abolition of flogging in September 1850.

In 1851, Hale served as counsel in the trials of anti-slavery activists that arose out of their forcible rescue of fugitive slave Shadrach Minkins from the custody of the United States Marshal in Boston.

=== Presidential candidate ===
Hale was the presidential nominee of the Liberty Party in 1848, but withdrew in support of the Free Soil ticket.

Hale was an unsuccessful candidate for President of the United States on the Free Soil ticket in 1852, finishing behind Democratic candidate Franklin Pierce and Whig candidate Winfield Scott. In March 1853, Hale was succeeded in the Senate by Democrat Charles G. Atherton and began practicing law in New York City.

=== Return to the Senate ===
Following the repeal of the Missouri Compromise, Democrats were again ousted in New Hampshire. Hale was elected to the Senate as a member of the new Republican Party in 1855, replacing Jared W. Williams, who had been appointed following the death of Charles G. Atherton. James Bell, a fellow Republican, was elected to New Hampshire's other Senate seat in the same election. Hale entered the Senate on July 30, 1855, was re-elected in 1859, and served until March 3, 1865.

Hale served as the chair of the Senate Republican Conference until 1862. That year, Hale succeeded in repealing the Navy's spirit ration, which he had attempted during his first Senate term.

== Minister to Spain ==
President Lincoln nominated Hale to the post of minister to Spain and he served in that capacity 1865–1869. Hale attributed his April 1869 recall to a quarrel with Horatio J. Perry, his secretary of legation. Perry had accused Hale of violating his diplomatic privilege of importing free of duty merchandise for his official or personal use by putting some goods up for sale and pocketing the proceeds. Hale's answer was that he had been misled about the rules by a commission merchant friendly to Perry. Perry was himself removed from his post in June 1869.

== Death and burial ==
Hale died in Dover, New Hampshire on November 19, 1873. He was buried at Pine Hill Cemetery in Dover.

== Legacy ==
Hale's Federal style house, built in 1813, is now part of the Woodman Institute Museum. New Hampshire Historical Marker No. 264 on Central Avenue in Dover marks the site of his home.

Longtime Washington journalist Benjamin Perley Poore wrote that Hale, as Senator in the late 1850s, "never failed to command attention":

The keen shafts of the Southerners, aimed at him, fell harmlessly to his feet, and his wonderful good nature disarmed malicious opposition. Those who felt that he had gone far astray in his political opinions did not accuse him of selfish motives, sordid purposes, or degraded intrigues. His was the "chasseur" style of oratory—now skirmishing on the outskirts of an opponent's position, then rallying on some strange point, pouring in a rattling fire, standing firm against a charge, and ever displaying a perfect independence of action and a disregard of partisan drill.

Hale is one of several prominent New Hampshire politicians with a statue at the New Hampshire State House Complex in Concord. Portraits of President Lincoln and John P. Hale hang next to each other in the chamber of the New Hampshire House of Representatives.

== Family ==
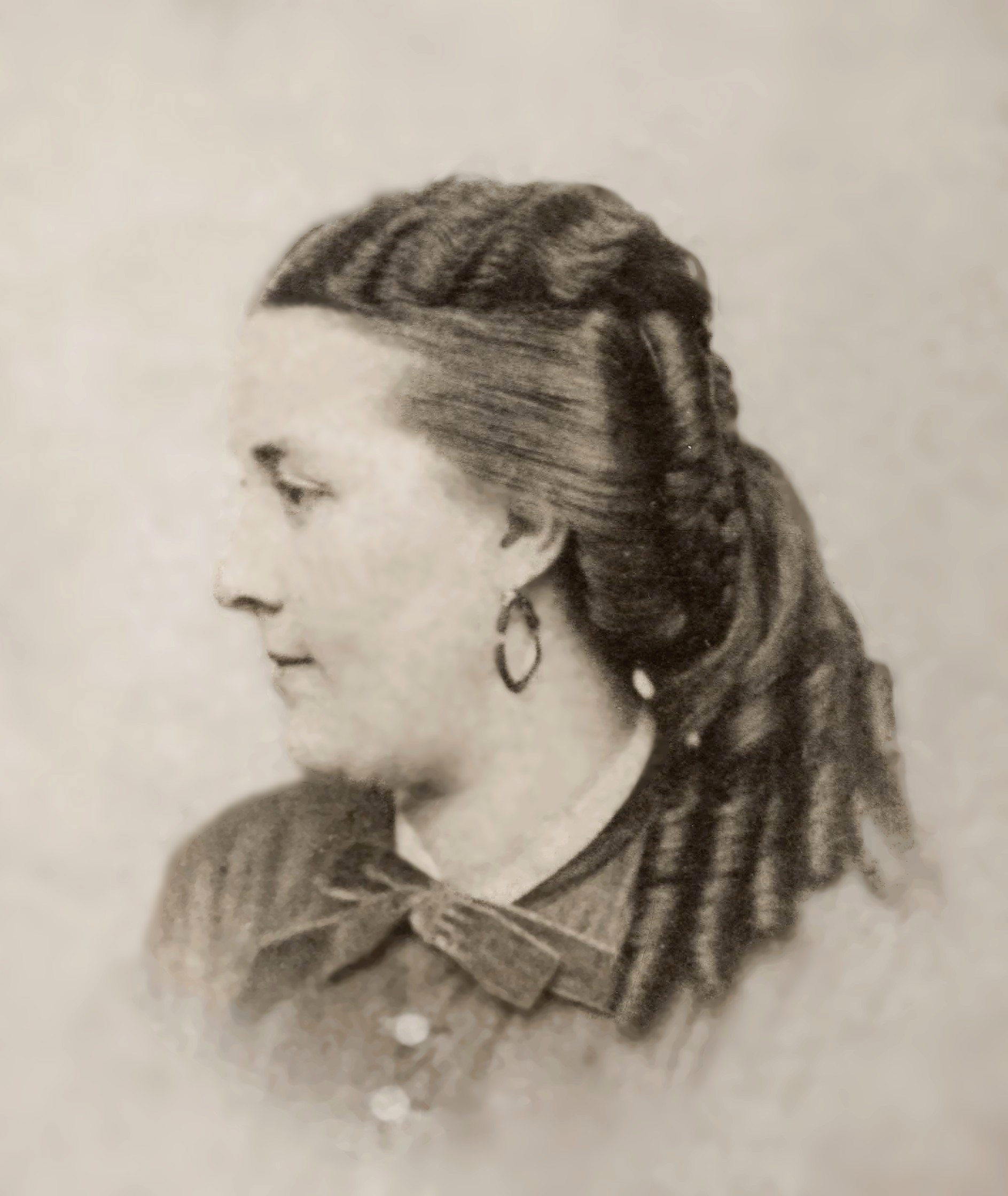
The picture of Lucy Hale found on the body of John Wilkes Booth

On September 2, 1834, Hale married Lucy Hill Lambert (1814–1902) in Berwick, Maine. They were the parents of two daughters, Elizabeth (Lizzie) (1835–1895) and Lucy (1841–1915).

Elizabeth Hale first married Edward Kinsley (1825–1888). Their only child died shortly after birth. Her second husband was William Henry 'Harry' Jacques (1847–1916).

Lucy Lambert Hale was secretly betrothed in 1865 to John Wilkes Booth, Abraham Lincoln's assassin. Booth had a picture of Lucy Hale with him when he was shot and killed by Sergeant Boston Corbett on April 26, 1865. Lucy Hale eventually married Senator William E. Chandler.

U.S. House of Representatives
Preceded by Ira Eastman	Member of the U.S. House of Representatives from New Hampshire's at-large congressional district Seat 4; 1843–1845	Seat abolished
Political offices
Preceded by Harry Hibbard	Speaker of the New Hampshire House of Representatives; 1846	Succeeded by Moses Norris Jr.
U.S. Senate
Preceded by Joseph Cilley	U.S. Senator (Class 2) from New Hampshire; 1847–1853; Served alongside: Charles G. Atherton, Moses Norris Jr.	Succeeded by Charles G. Atherton
Preceded by Jared W. Williams	U.S. Senator (Class 2) from New Hampshire; 1855–1865; Served alongside: James Bell, Daniel Clark	Succeeded by Aaron H. Cragin
Preceded by Stephen Mallory	Chair of the Senate Naval Affairs Committee; 1861–1864	Succeeded by James Grimes
Preceded by James Grimes	Chair of the Senate District of Columbia Committee; 1864–1865	Succeeded by Lot Morrill
Party political offices
Preceded by James G. Birney	Liberty nominee for President of the United States; Withdrew; 1848	Succeeded by Gerrit Smith
New office	Chair of the Senate Republican Conference; 1859–1862	Succeeded by Henry B. Anthony
Preceded by Martin Van Buren	Free Soil nominee for President of the United States; 1852	Party dissolved
Diplomatic posts
Preceded by Gustav Koerner	United States Minister to Spain; 1865–1869	Succeeded by Daniel Sickles
