= Nelson Barrere =

American politician

Member of the U.S. House of Representatives from Ohio's 7th district
- In office March 4, 1851 – March 4, 1853
- Preceded by: Jonathan D. Morris
- Succeeded by: Aaron Harlan

Member of the Ohio House of Representatives from the Adams & Brown counties district
- In office December 4, 1837 – December 2, 1838 Serving with William Kendall
- Preceded by: James Louden; John Glover
- Succeeded by: John H. Blair; Joseph Leedom

Personal details
- Born: April 1, 1808 Highland County, Ohio, US
- Died: August 20, 1883 (aged 75) Hillsboro, Ohio, US
- Resting place: Presbyterian Cemetery
- Party: Whig
- Education: Augusta College (Kentucky)

Nelson Barrere (April 1, 1808 – August 20, 1883) was a 19th-century American lawyer and politician who served one term as a U.S. representative from Ohio from 1851 to 1853. He was an uncle of Granville Barrere.

== Biography ==
Born in New Market, near Hillsboro, Ohio, Barrere attended the common schools, and Hillsboro High School in 1827. He graduated from Augusta (Kentucky) College in 1830.

=== Early career ===
He studied law and was admitted to the bar in 1833. He commenced practice in Hillsboro before moving to West Union, Ohio, in 1834. In 1846, he returned to Hillsboro, where he resided until his death.

He served as member of the State house of representatives in 1837 and 1838.

=== Congress ===
Barrere was elected as a Whig to the Thirty-second Congress (March 4, 1851 – March 3, 1853). He was an unsuccessful candidate for reelection in 1852 to the Thirty-third Congress.

He resumed the practice of law.

=== Death and burial ===
He died in Hillsboro, Ohio, August 20, 1883. He was interred in Presbyterian Cemetery, New Market, Ohio.

== Sources ==
- United States Congress. "Nelson Barrere (id: B000174)". Biographical Directory of the United States Congress.

U.S. House of Representatives
Preceded by Jonathan D. Morris	Member of the U.S. House of Representatives from Ohio's 7th congressional district 1851-1853	Succeeded by Aaron Harlan
Party political offices
Preceded by Samuel Finley Vinton	Whig Party nominee for Governor of Ohio; 1853	Succeeded by party dissolved
