= 1848 Free Soil & Liberty national conventions =

Political meetings in the United States

1848 Free Soil National Convention
- 1848 presidential election
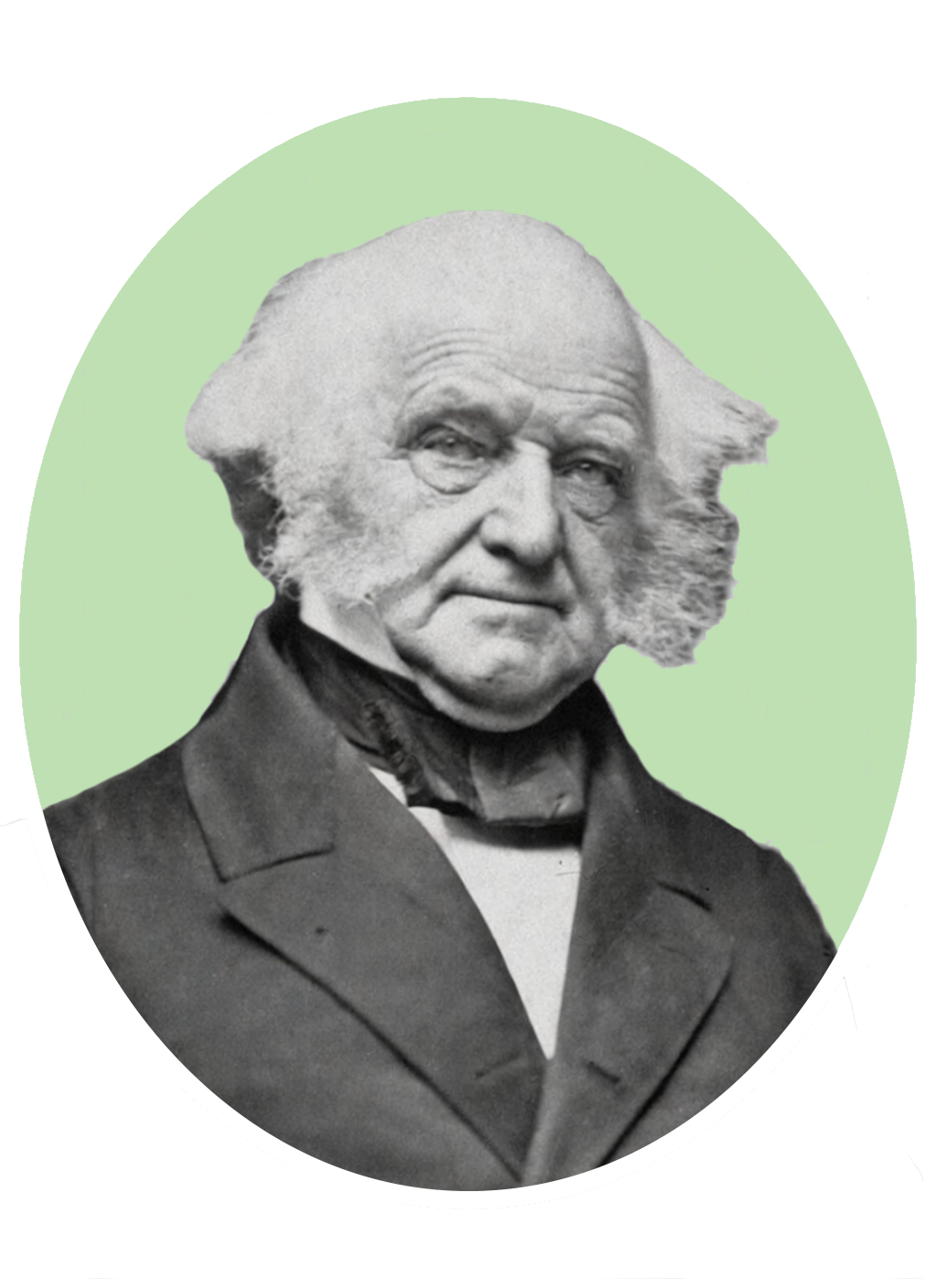
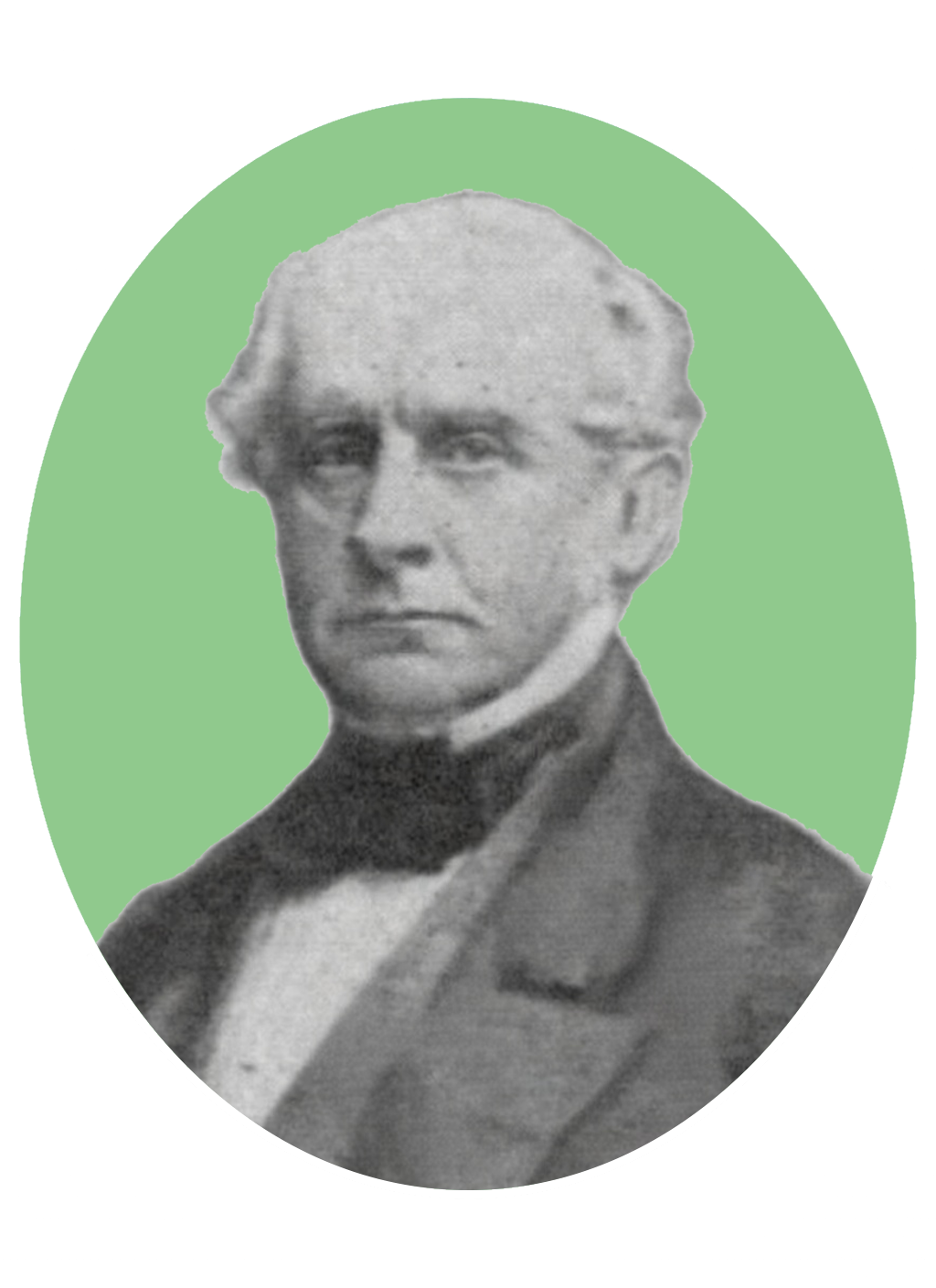
- Nominees; Van Buren and Adams

Convention
- Date(s): August 9–10, 1848
- City: Buffalo, New York
- Venue: Court House Park
- Chair: Nathaniel Sawyer
- Notable speakers: List: Charles F. Adams Sr. Henry Bibb Jacob Brinkerhoff Benjamin F. Butler Erastus D. Culver Frederick Douglass James R. Doolittle Joshua R. Giddings Joshua Leavitt John B. Mahan Samuel Joseph May James W. Nye Milton Sutliff

Candidates
- Presidential nominee: Martin Van Buren of New York
- Vice-presidential nominee: Charles F. Adams Sr. of Massachusetts

National conventions of the Free Soil and Liberty parties met in 1847 and 1848 to nominate candidates for president and vice president in advance of the 1848 United States presidential election. These assemblies resulted in the creation of the national Free Soil Party, a union of political abolitionists with antislavery Conscience Whigs and Barnburner Democrats to oppose the westward extension of slavery into the U.S. territories. Former President Martin Van Buren was nominated for president by the Free Soil National Convention that met at Buffalo, New York on August 9, 1848; Charles Francis Adams Sr. was nominated for vice president. Van Buren and Adams received 291,409 popular votes in the national election, almost all from the free states; his popularity among northern Democrats was great enough to deny his Democratic rival, Lewis Cass, the crucial state of New York, throwing the state and the election to Whig Zachary Taylor.

== Background ==
The organizers of the Liberty Party found themselves at a crossroads following the 1844 United States elections. The party had experienced rapid growth from 1840 to 1844, particularly in New England, where Liberty candidates were elected to state legislative offices. In 1844, the Liberty nominees for president and vice president, James G. Birney and Thomas Morris, received 62,025 votes in the 13 free states, representing 2.30% of the national total. In New York and Michigan the Liberty vote was more than the margin separating Democrat James K. Polk and Whig Henry Clay.

After 1844, the party's growth plateaued, and party leaders began to consider the future trajectory of the movement. Led by Salmon P. Chase, one group favored cooperation with anti-slavery Whigs and Democrats, even suggesting Liberty candidates should be willing to withdraw in favor of major party candidates who pledged opposition to slavery. This strategy was most successful in New Hampshire, where in 1846 a coalition of Liberty men, Whigs, and Independent Democrats elected John P. Hale to the United States Senate. Others opposed any cooperation with the major parties and argued the Liberty Party should adopt a broad reform platform in order to appeal to voters outside the antislavery movement. This group organized the Liberty League to promote their ideas within the party and included political abolitionists such as Gerrit Smith, William Goodell, and others.

== 1847 Liberty nomination ==
Unlike in 1844, there was no obvious candidate who could command the unanimous support of the Liberty Party. While leaders of the Liberty League hoped to persuade Birney to stand for a third time, his reputation had been damaged by missteps during the 1844 campaign, and Birney himself was disinclined to run again.

=== Liberty League convention ===
The Liberty League met at Macedon Lock, New York over June 8–10, 1847 and nominated Smith for president and Elihu Burritt for vice president. (Burritt declined the nomination, and the League eventually promoted Charles C. Foote to be Smith's running mate.) Seventy delegates were in attendance, including Goodell, who presided over the meeting. The convention adopted a platform endorsing an antislavery interpretation of the United States Constitution, free trade, abolition of the army and navy, and land reform. Reflecting the influence of early feminists within the League, prominent female abolitionists Lydia Maria Child and Lucretia Mott received one vote apiece in the balloting for president.

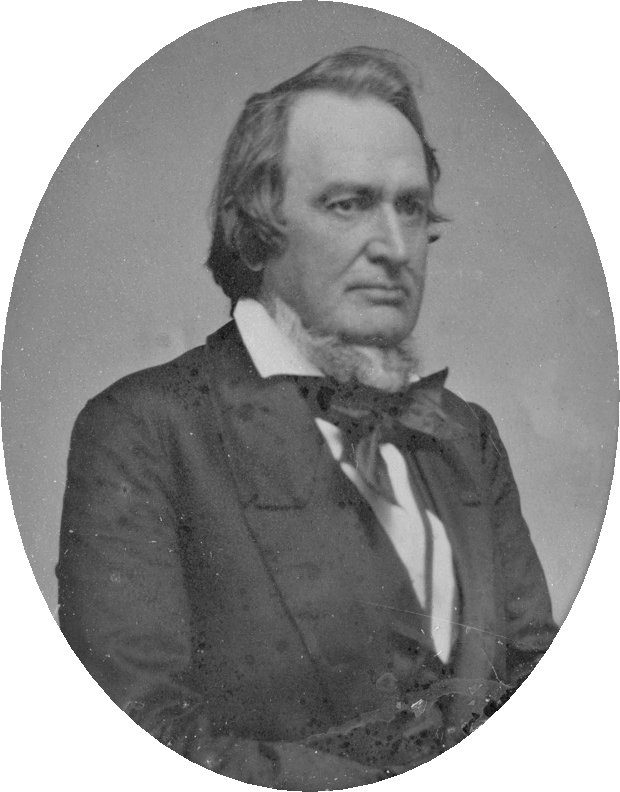
Gerrit Smith
of New York

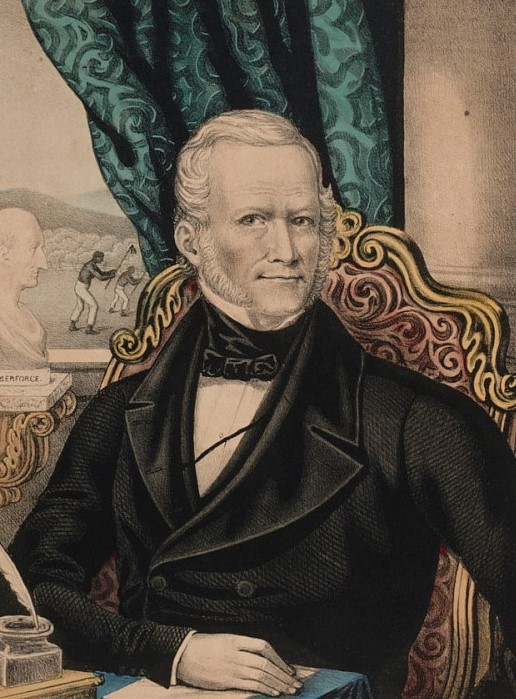
Former Huntsville, Alabama Mayor
James G. Birney
of Michigan

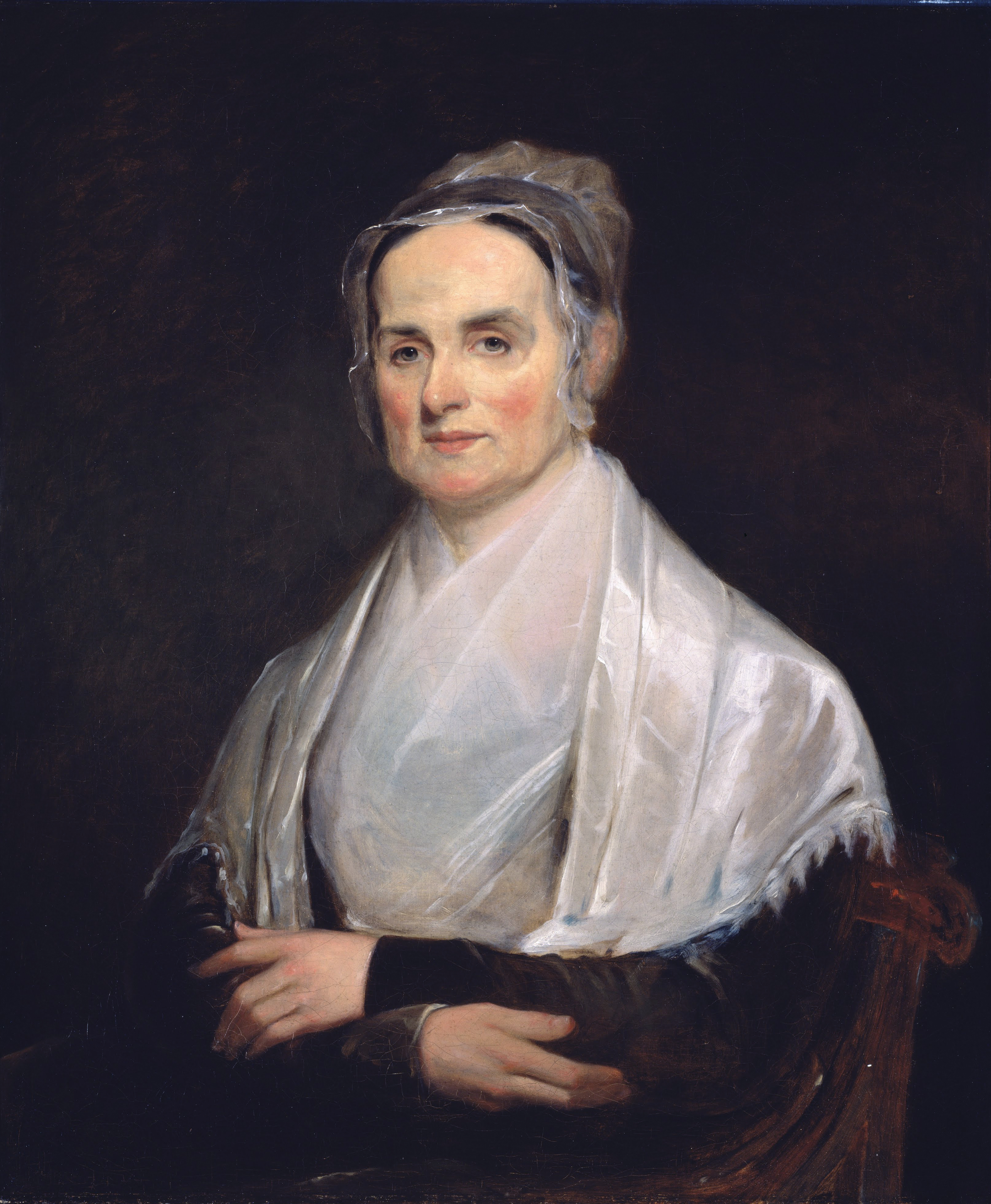
Lucretia Mott
of Pennsylvania

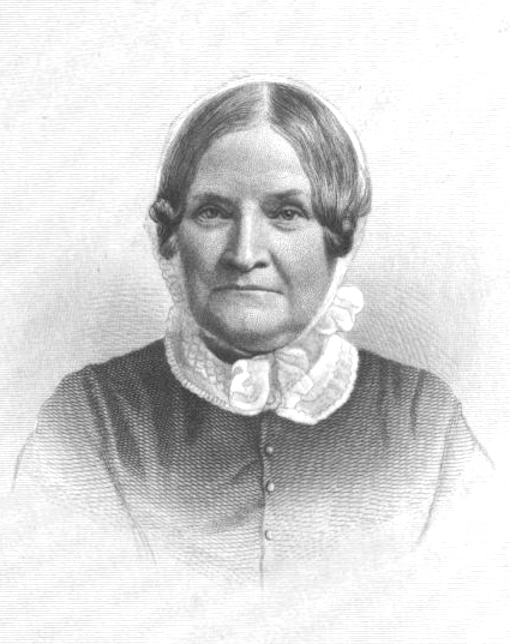
Lydia Child
of Massachusetts

Presidential vote		Vice Presidential vote	
	1st		1st
Gerrit Smith	67	Elihu Burritt	63
James G. Birney	6	James G. Birney	5
Lucretia Mott	1	William Goodell	3
Lydia Maria Child	1		

=== Liberty Party convention ===
A deputation from the Liberty League was present when the Liberty Party held their national convention at Buffalo, New York on October 20, 1847. They aimed to secure Smith's nomination by the national party on a platform accepting the resolves of the Macedon convention. The faction led by Chase, meanwhile, continued to seek support from disaffected members of the two major parties. In the months preceding the convention, they began to promote Hale as a candidate capable of uniting a broad coalition of Liberty men, Conscience Whigs, and Independent Democrats on the basis of opposition to slavery's extension. A contingent of Liberty leaders including Joshua Leavitt, Henry B. Stanton, and John Greenleaf Whittier met with Hale in Boston in July 1847 to encourage him to make a public declaration of his candidacy. Hale, however, was concerned that accepting the party's nomination would weaken his position in the Senate and asked for the convention to be delayed until the following spring. When the Chase faction failed to secure the delay of the convention, Hale wrote to Lewis Tappan requesting that his name not be placed in nomination at the Buffalo convention, but Tappan ignored this request.

Acceptance of Hale required a significant shift in the party's attitude and approach to politics. Hale had earned the high regard of many Liberty Party voters for his protests against the gag rule and his opposition to the annexation of Texas; however, he was not a member of the Liberty Party, had never belonged to any antislavery society, and stopped short of calling for the immediate abolition of slavery, instead adopting a policy of non-extension. Chase and his allies worked tirelessly throughout the summer in support of Hale's candidacy; their efforts were rewarded, as Hale was nominated overwhelmingly by the national convention, with 103 votes to 44 for Smith. Former Ohio Supreme Court Justice Leicester King was nominated for vice president.

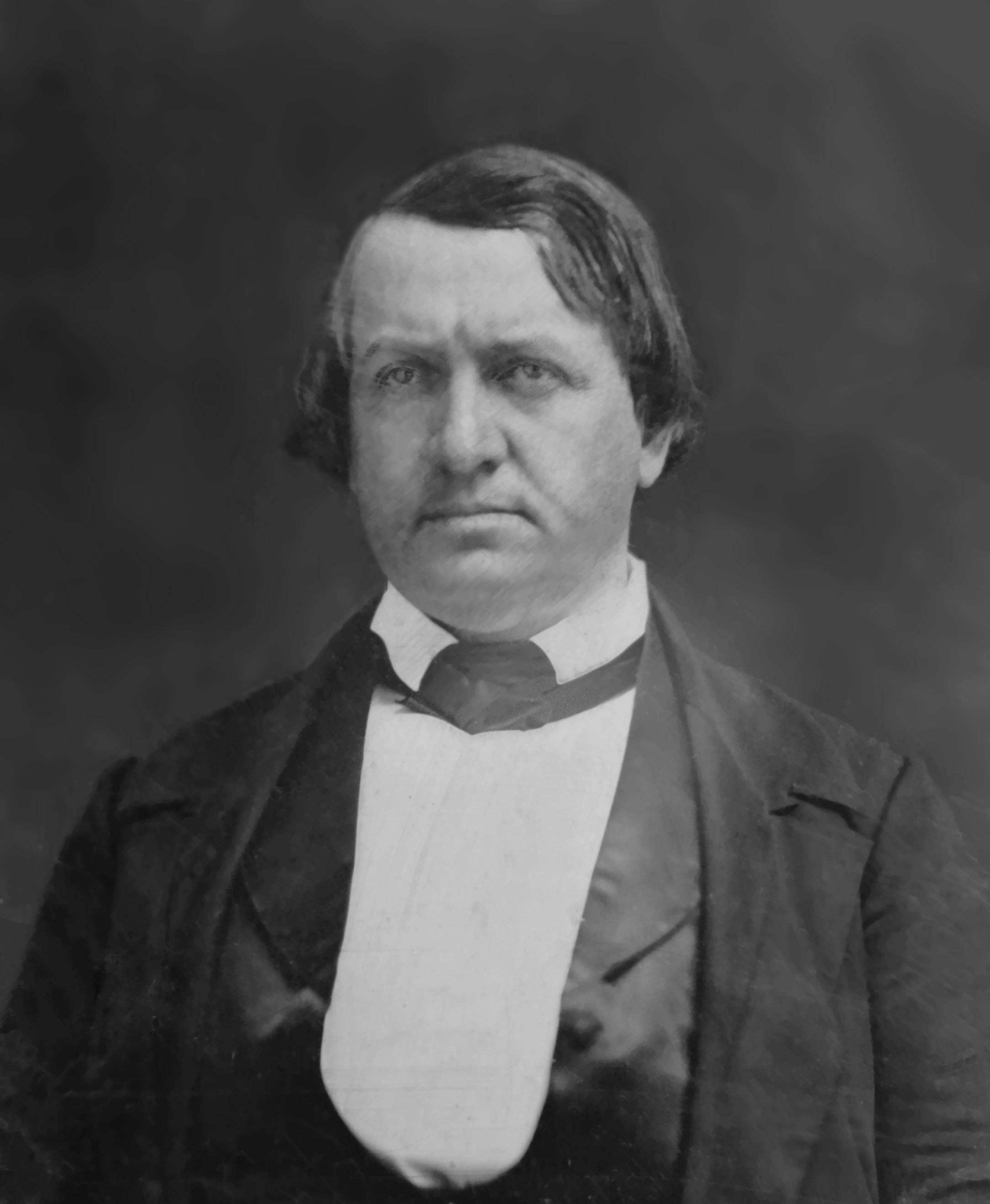
Senator
John P. Hale
of New Hampshire

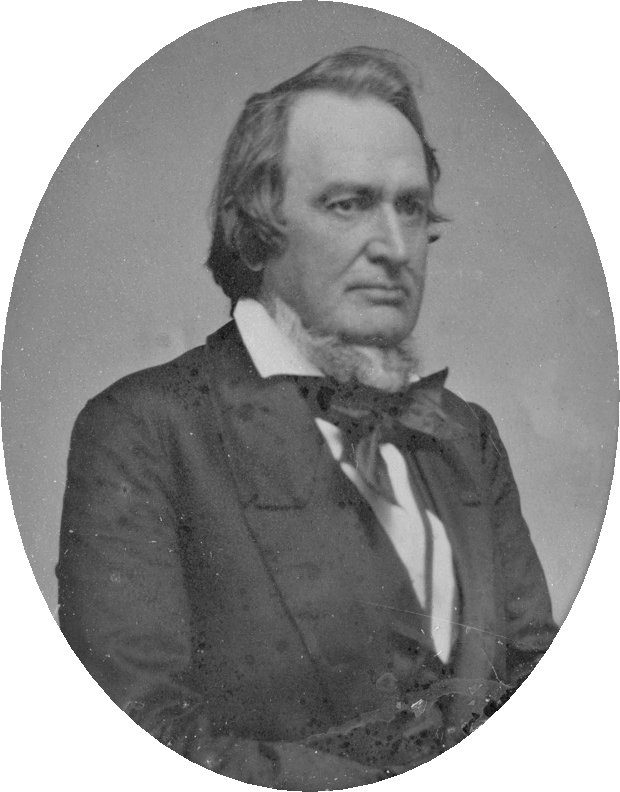
Gerrit Smith
of New York

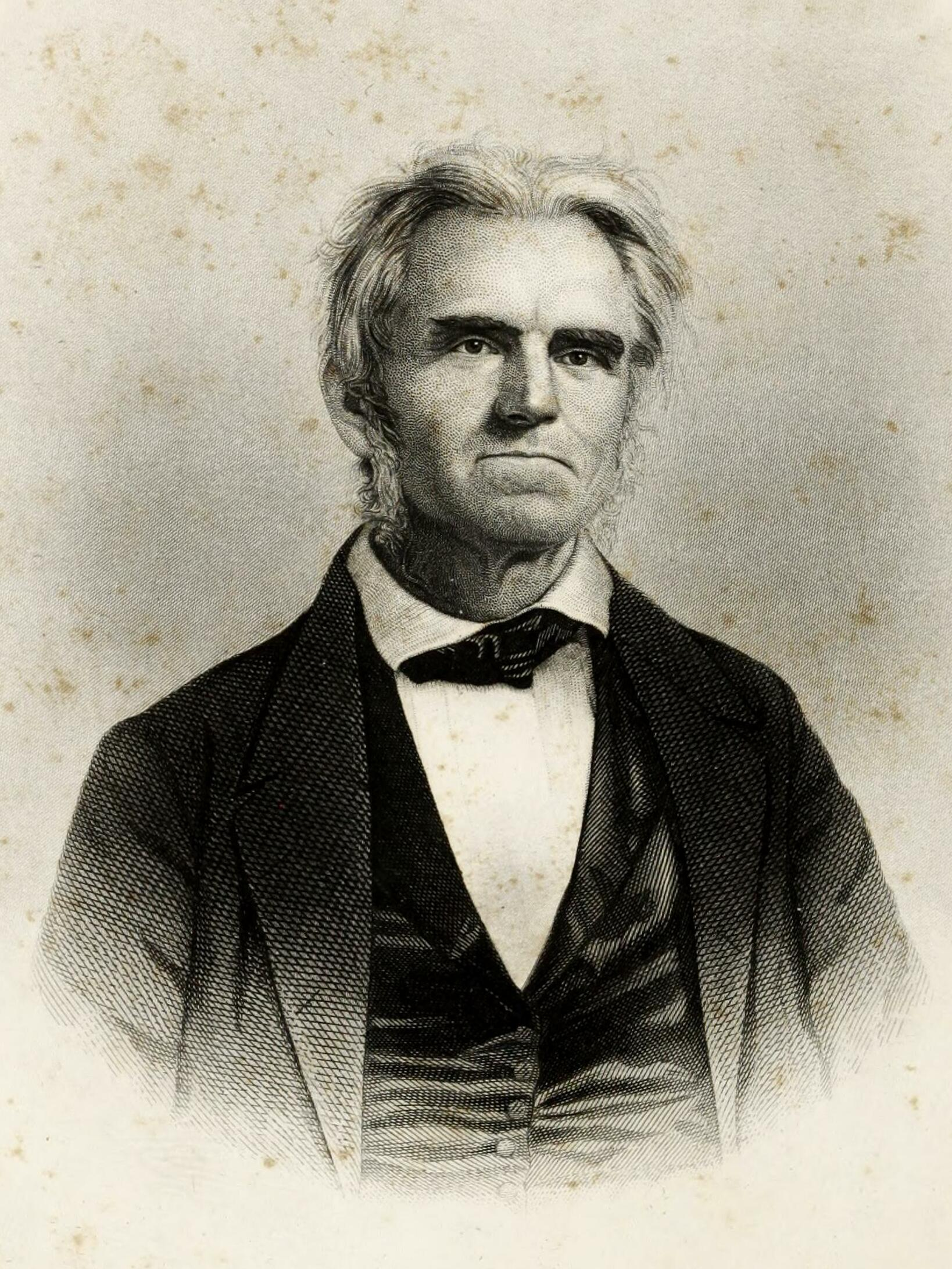
Former State Superintendent of Common Schools
Samuel Lewis
of Ohio

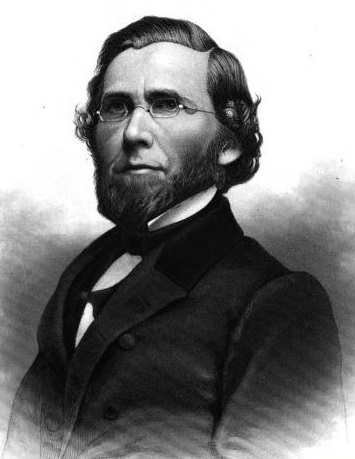
Reverend
Samuel C. Fessenden
of Maine

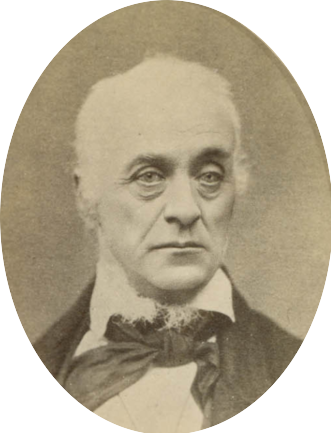
William Goodell
of New York

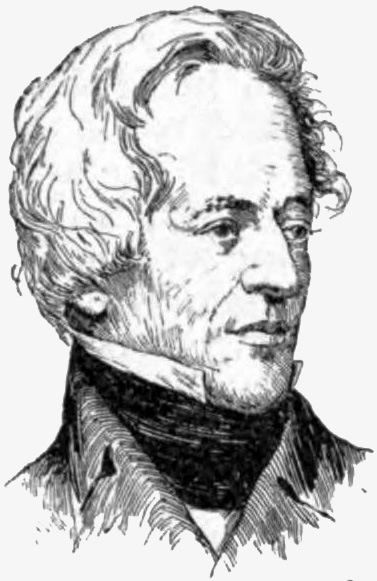
Former Judge of Common Pleas
William Jay
of New York

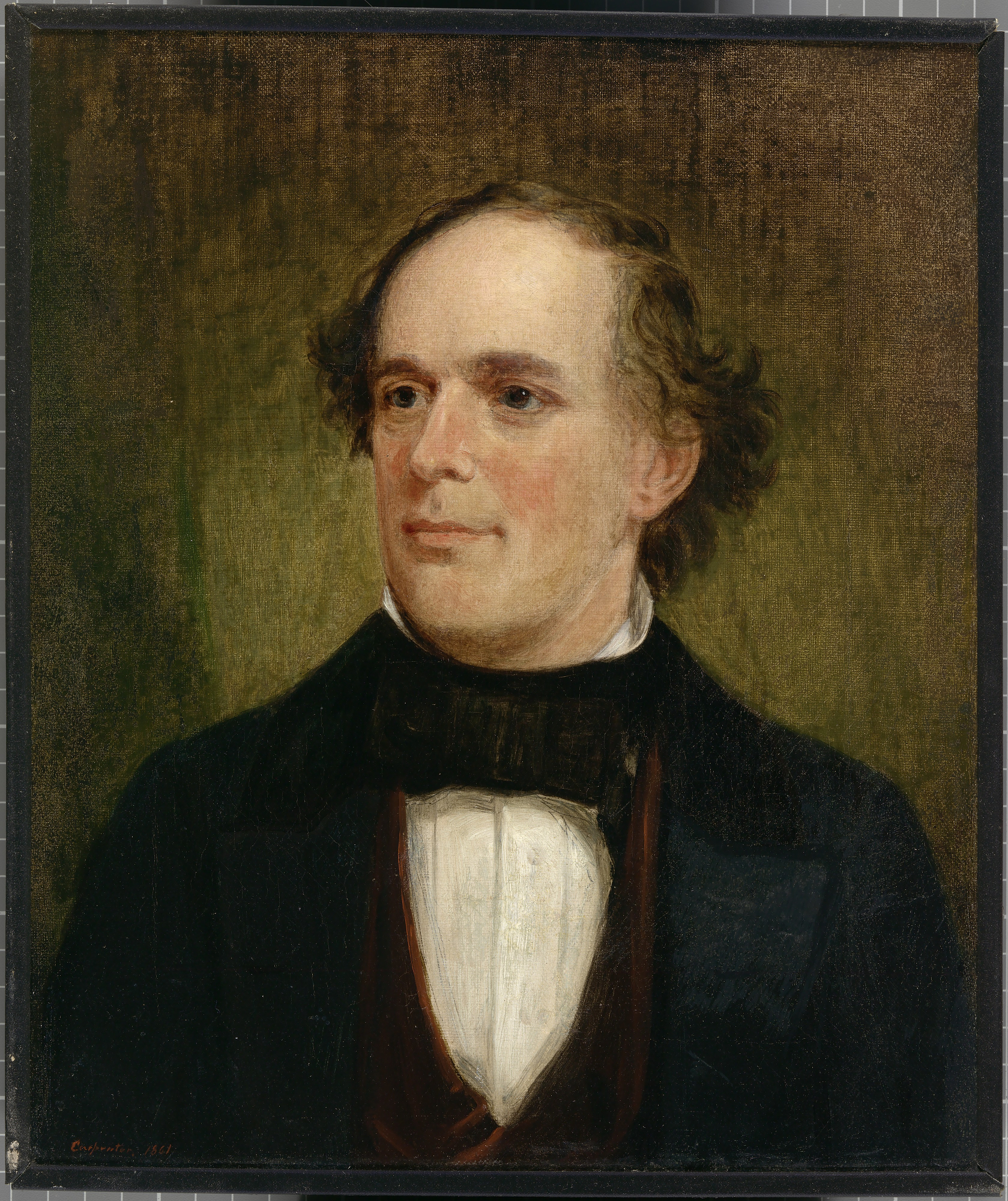
Former City Councilor
Salmon P. Chase
of Ohio

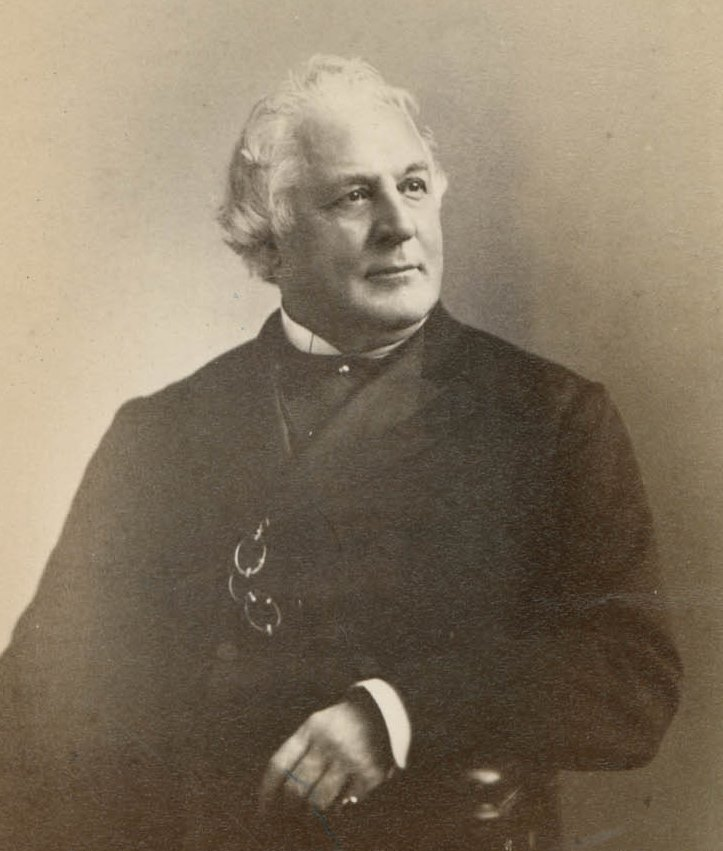
John Jay
of New York

Presidential ballot		Vice presidential ballot		
	1st		1st	2nd
John P. Hale	103	Owen Lovejoy	76	67
Gerrit Smith	44	Leicester King	72	82
Samuel Lewis	4	Francis Julius LeMoyne	4	5
Samuel C. Fessenden	3	William L. Chaplin	1	0
William Goodell	1	Salmon P. Chase	1	0
William Jay	1	Ichabod Codding	1	4
Salmon P. Chase	1	Samuel C. Fessenden	1	0
John Jay	1	Gerrit Smith	1	0
		Alvan Stewart	1	2

== 1848 Free Soil nomination ==
Results of the first ballot for nominee for president

The nomination of Hale by the Liberty National Convention was a major victory for the coalitionists. Crucially, it secured a candidate who could be persuaded to withdraw if a coalition with antislavery Whigs and Democrats were later possible.

Events in the spring of 1848 soon presented such an opportunity. The end of the Mexican-American War raised the question of westward expansion and the extension of slavery into the U.S. territories. In 1846, northern Whigs crossed party lines to support a proposal by David Wilmot, a Democrat from Pennsylvania, to exclude slavery from all of the territory acquired from Mexico. The 1848 Democratic National Convention repudiated the Wilmot Proviso and nominated Lewis Cass for president on a platform endorsing popular sovereignty. Cass's nomination enraged supporters of former President Martin Van Buren, who had been denied the nomination of his party in 1844 due to his opposition to the annexation of Texas; they considered the rejection of Van Buren evidence of the party's subservience to the Slave Power. The 1848 Whig National Convention at Philadelphia took no position on the Wilmot Proviso, but its candidate, General Zachary Taylor, was a slaveholder from Louisiana who had risen to prominence by his exploits in a war most abolitionists considered immoral. Abolitionists thus faced a choice between a proslavery Democrat and a slaveholding Whig. These conditions were ripe for a third candidate to emerge and unite the support of antislavery men of all parties, as Chase and his allies had long anticipated.

In May 1848, Barnburners in New York, predicting a Cass victory, called for a convention of anti-Cass Democrats in Utica on June 22. This convention nominated Van Buren for president and Senator Henry Dodge for vice president. In the aftermath of Taylor's nomination, a contingent of disgruntled Whigs led by Massachusetts delegates Henry Wilson and Charles Allen withdrew from the Philadelphia convention and called for a new meeting of antislavery advocates at Buffalo. Both groups recognized the importance of uniting all antislavery voters under one roof; when Dodge declined the vice presidential nomination, it opened the door for the Barnburners to join the growing free soil movement.

Members of the Liberty Party objected to Van Buren due to his opposition to the abolition of slavery in Washington, D.C. and his stance during the Amistad case. Leavitt stated that they "cannot support him, without deliberately giving the lie to all our own declarations for fifteen years past" as Van Buren was a "Northern man with Southern principles".

The Buffalo Free Soil convention opened on August 9 with approximately 20,000 Democrats, Whigs, and Liberty men in attendance. Many of the Whigs hoped for the nomination of Supreme Court Justice John McLean, who had been available as a candidate for the Whig and Anti-Masonic parties in past elections. Most Liberty men still supported Hale; but the importance of the Barnburners, by far the largest contingent of the new party, made Van Buren the early frontrunner for the nomination. McLean soon found he lacked sufficient support to be nominated and withdrew his name from consideration; an informal vote within the committee of conferees found a majority in favor of Van Buren. In exchange for Liberty support for Van Buren, Chase negotiated acceptance of much of the Liberty Party's platform, including the non-extension of slavery. As a gesture to the party's Whig element, Charles Francis Adams Sr., son of the late John Quincy Adams, was nominated for vice president.

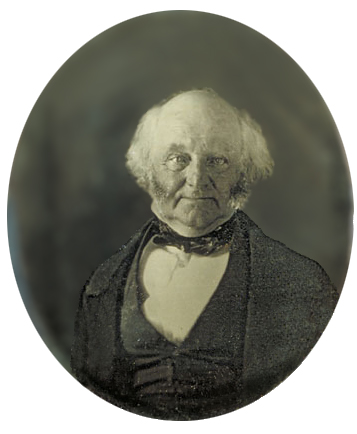
Former President
Martin Van Buren
of New York

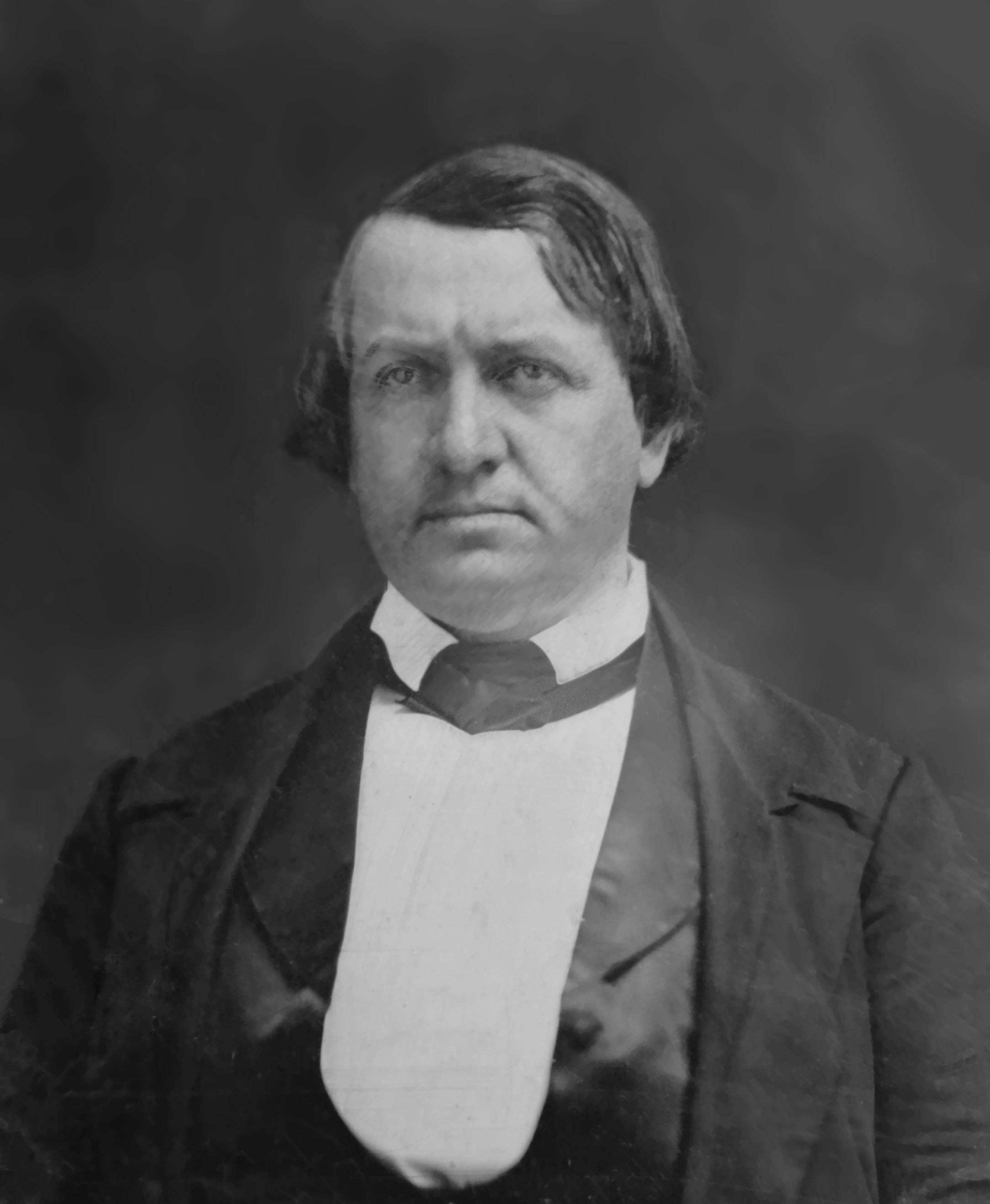
Senator
John P. Hale
of New Hampshire

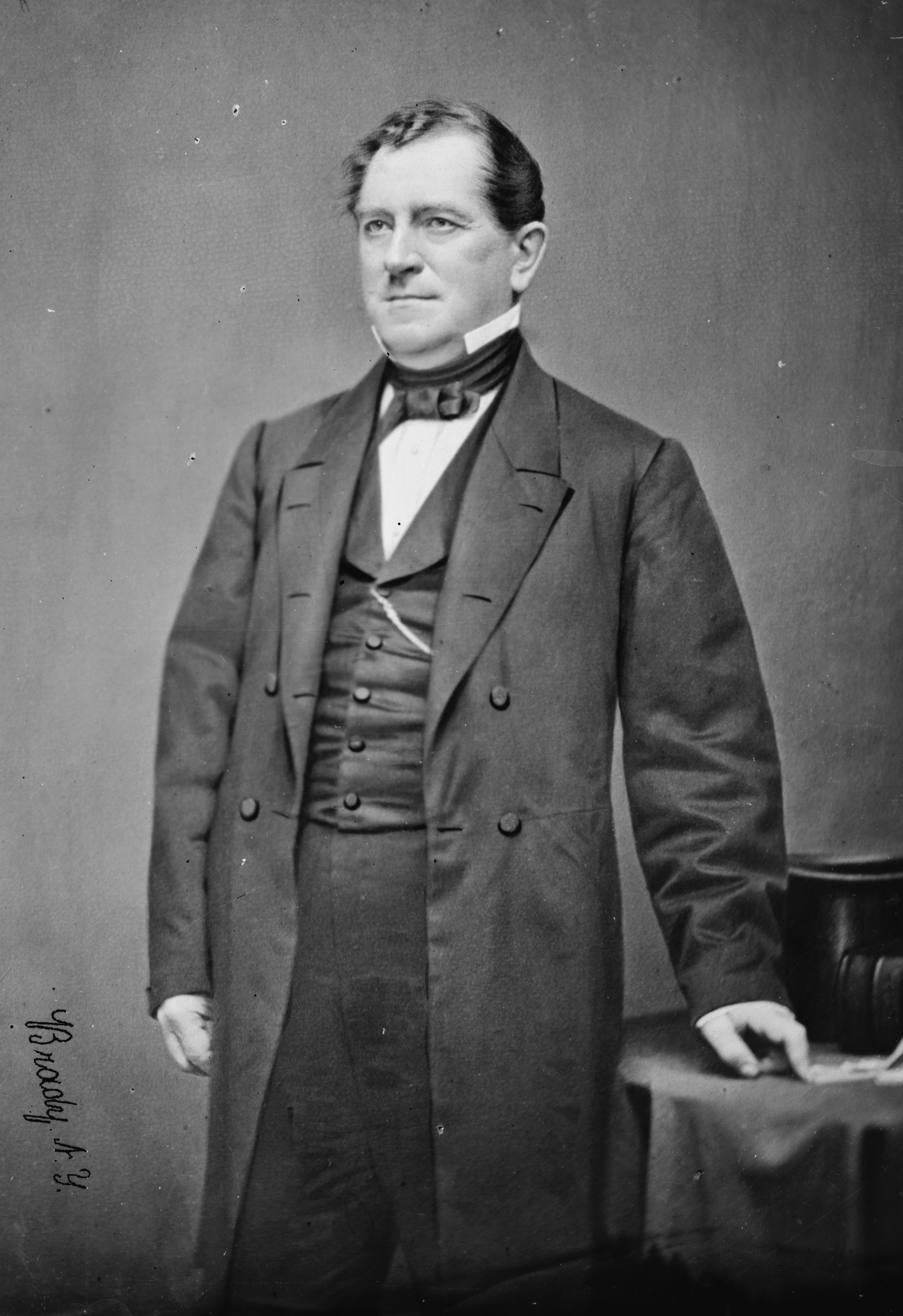
Representative
Joshua R. Giddings
of Ohio

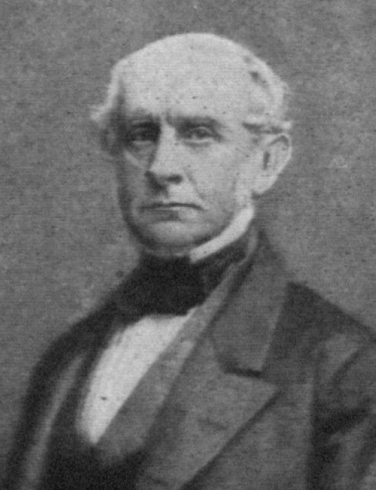
Former State Senator
Charles F. Adams Sr.
of Massachusetts

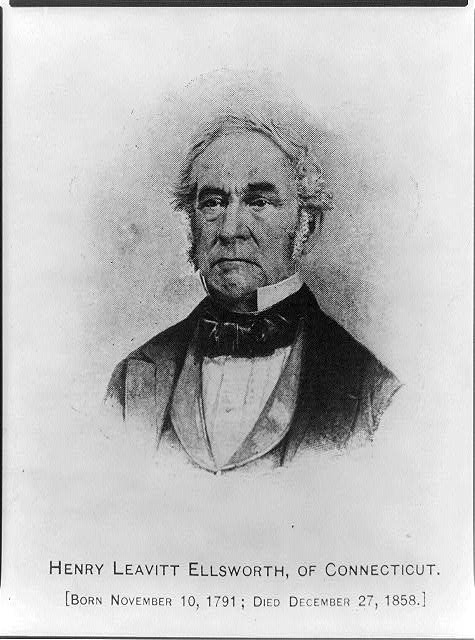
Former Commissioner of
the U.S. Patent Office
Henry L. Ellsworth
of Indiana

Presidential vote		Vice Presidential vote	
	1st		1st
Martin Van Buren	254	Charles Francis Adams Sr.	Acclamation
John Parker Hale	183		
Joshua R. Giddings	23		
Charles Francis Adams Sr.	13		
Henry Leavitt Ellsworth	3		
Scattering	1		

== Free Soil platform ==
Like the Liberty platform of 1844, but unlike the more radical Liberty League document, the national platform of the Free Soil Party accepted the premise that the United States Congress had no legal or constitutional authority to abolish slavery in the slave states. Instead, it occupied the narrower ground of opposing the admission of new slave states and territories. The platform made no mention of the Fugitive Slave Act of 1793 or the civil and political rights of African Americans, unlike previous Liberty Party documents. It included planks endorsing traditional Democratic economic policies which many in the Liberty Party had long supported, including a federal homestead act, as well as public support for internal improvements.

- Slavery in the several States of this Union which recognize its existence, depends upon the State laws alone, which cannot be repealed or modified by the Federal Government, and for which laws that Government is not responsible. We therefore propose no interference by Congress with slavery within the limits of any state.
- In the judgement of this convention, Congress has no more power to make a slave than to make a king; no more power to institute or establish slavery than to institute or establish monarchy.
- It is the duty of the federal government to relieve itself of all responsibility for the existence or continuance of slavery wherever the government possesses constitutional power to legislate on that subject, and is thus responsible for its existence.
- We accept the issue which the slave power has forced upon us; and to their demand for more slave states and more slave territory, our calm but final answer is: No more slave states and no more slave territory.

== 1848 National Liberty nomination ==
The acolytes of the Liberty League were unimpressed by the result of the Free Soil convention. These abolitionists had objected to Hale in spite of his spirited opposition to the gag rule; they were hardly inclined to support Van Buren, who had endorsed the gag rule as president. In the wake of the Utica convention, the dissidents met at Buffalo over June 14–15 to nominate Smith as the candidate of the "National Liberty Party;" Foote was again nominated for vice president against a crowded field that included Black abolitionist Samuel Ringgold Ward, Mott, (who would shortly play a leading role at the Seneca Falls Convention,) and Frederick Douglass. The party published an address to the people of the United States in which they asserted the antislavery character of the constitution and endorsed the immediate abolition of slavery in addition to a slew of political reforms, including universal suffrage, land reform, a progressive income tax, abolition of the army and navy, free trade, and utopian socialism.

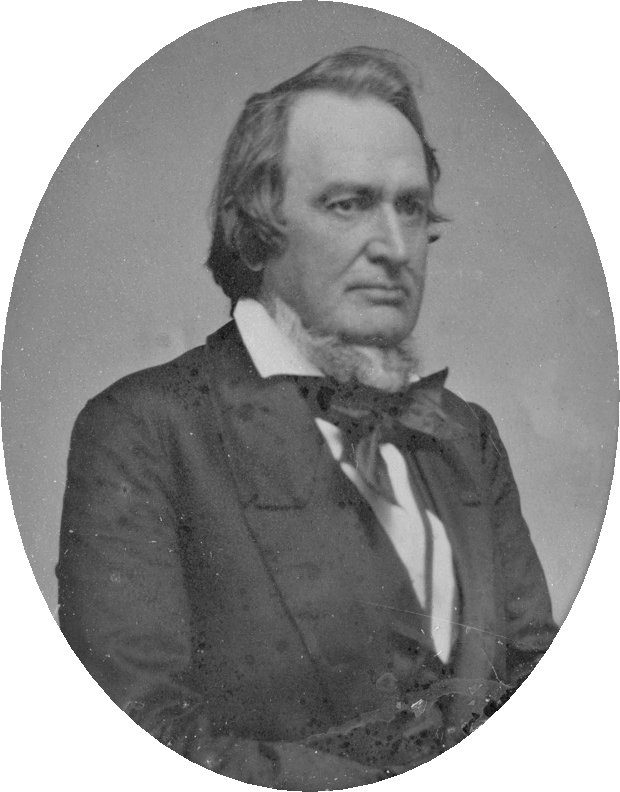
Gerrit Smith
of New York

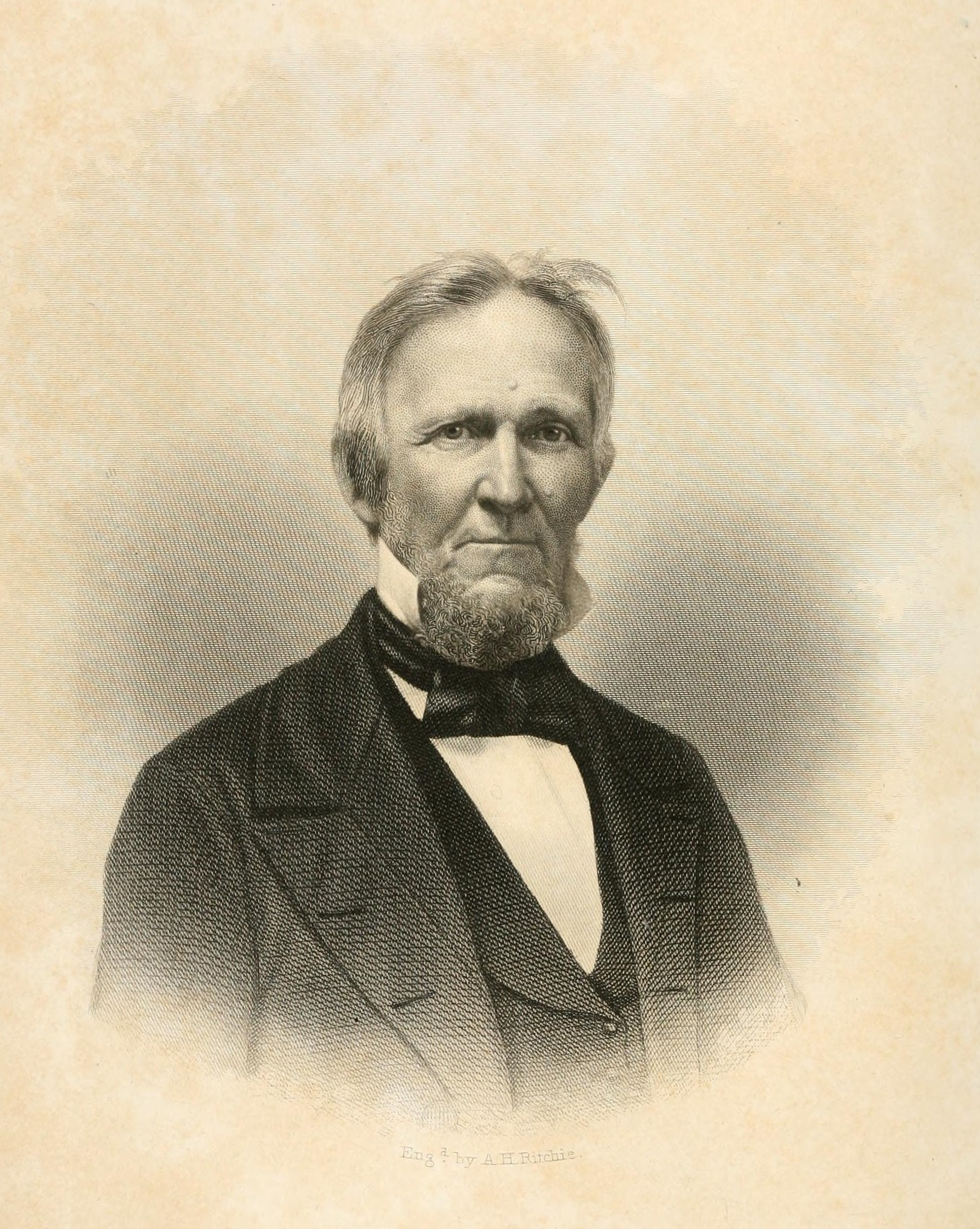
Beriah Green
of New York

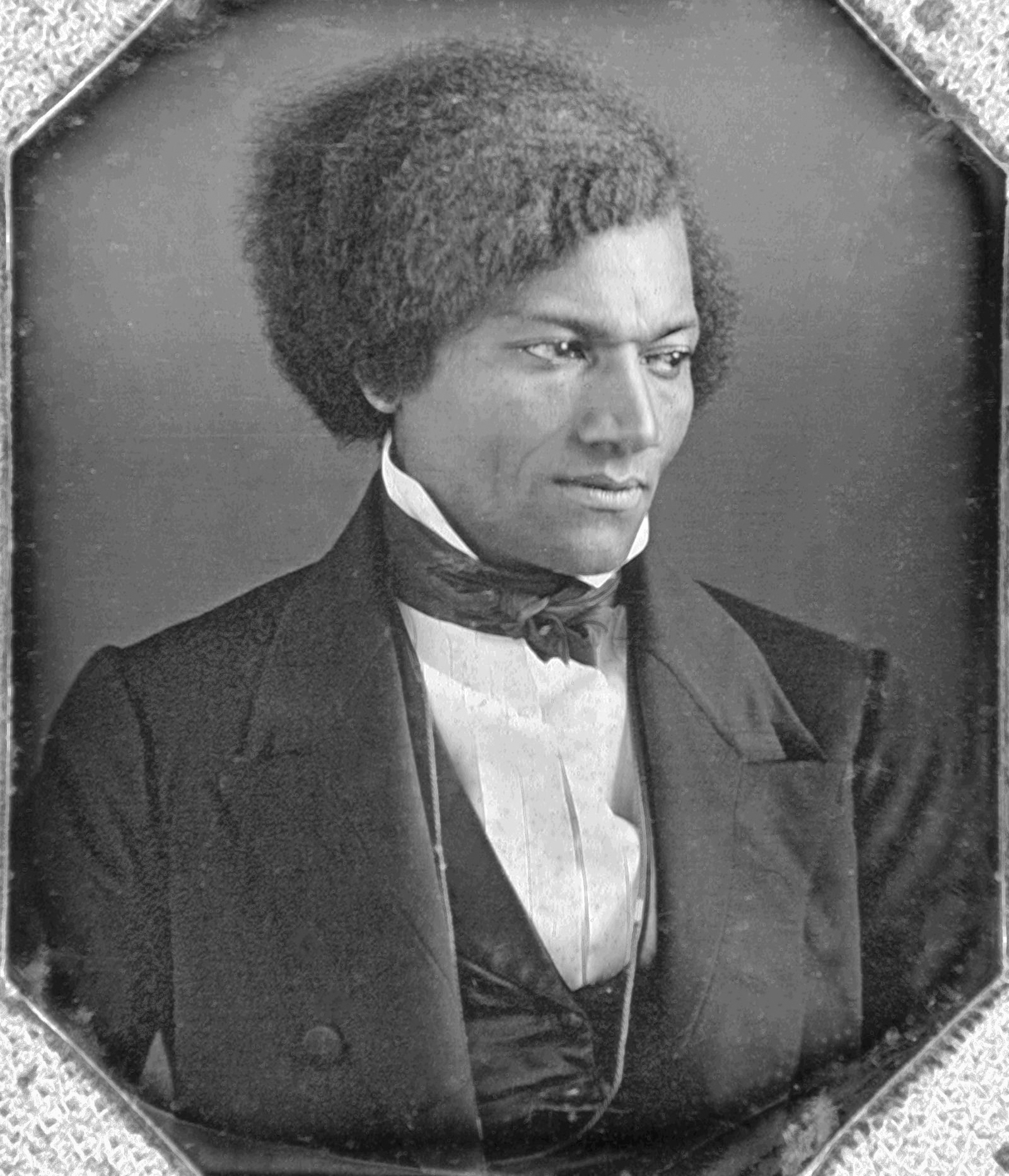
Frederick Douglass
of New York

Presidential vote		Vice Presidential vote	
	1st		1st
Gerrit Smith	99	Charles C. Foote	44
Beriah Green	2	George Bradburn	12
Frederick Douglass	1	Samuel Ringgold Ward	12
Charles C. Foote	1	Lucretia Mott	5
Amos A. Sampson	1	John Curtis	3
		Beriah Green	3
		Charles O. Shepard	3
		Frederick Douglass	1
		Edward Smith	1

== National Liberty platform ==
The platform adopted by the National Liberty Party at Buffalo completed the separation of the Liberty Leaguers from the majority faction of the Liberty Party who would go on to support Van Buren and the free soil movement in the general election. The delegates approved a preamble and thirteen resolutions rejecting the result of the "spurious" 1847 Liberty Party convention and declaring the National Liberty Party a "permanent" organization committed to universal application of the doctrine of equal rights. In pointed contrast to the more moderate position staked out by the Free Soilers, they declared all proslavery laws and constitutions to be null and void and asserted the power and obligation of the United States Congress to abolish slavery. They endorsed the free-produce movement and the recent escape attempt by 77 enslaved people in Washington, D.C. In keeping with previous Liberty League documents, the platform expressed general support for land reform, temperance, and pacifism, condemned secret societies and the Mexican-American War, and denounced Taylor and Cass as respectively an "enslaver" and "butcher of men" and a "demagogue."

- In light of these opposite and characteristic proceedings, we cannot hesitate to decide, that the Convention of 1843 was a genuine, and that of 1847 a spurious, Liberty Party Convention; and that, whilst the memory of the former should be cherished, that of the latter should be loathed by every lover of the true Liberty Party.
- The Liberty Party is not a temporary but a permanent party—not a piece-of-an-idea party, but the whole-of-an-idea party—not bound to carry out the one idea of political justice against slavery only, but against wars, tariffs, the traffic of intoxicating drinks, land monopolies, and secret societies, and whatever else is opposed to that comprehensive, great and glorious One Idea.
- The slaveholder, as such, has no rights, and that slaveholding laws are no laws;—that the one is but a pirate, and the other but the bloody code of his bloodiest piracy;—and that every constitution, or compact, or religion, which justifies this pirate, or upholds his piracy, merits nothing better than the utmost contempt, and the deepest execration.

== Aftermath ==
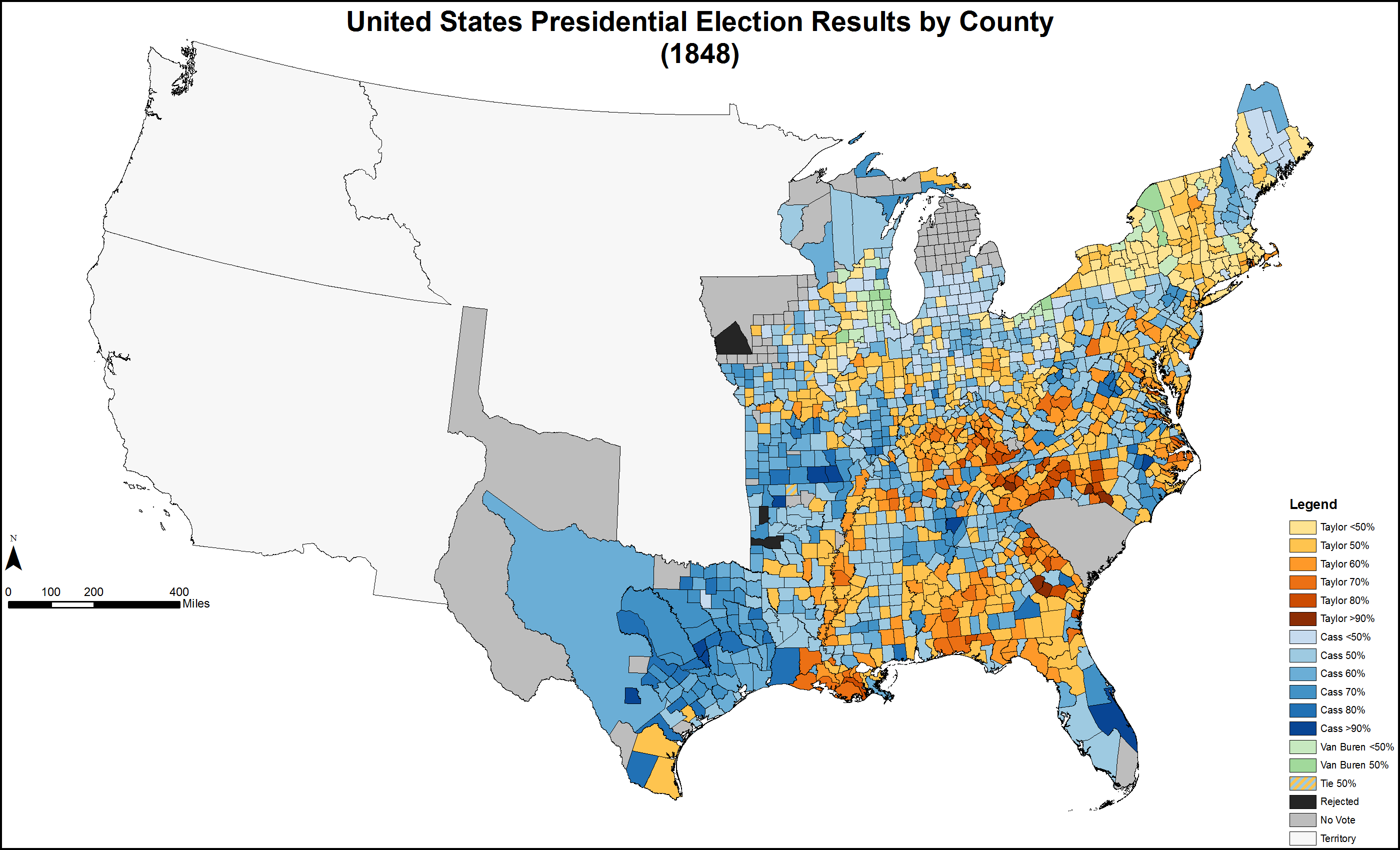
County results for the 1848 presidential election. Counties reporting pluralities for the Free Soil Party (Van Buren) are in green. In no county was the National Liberty Party (Smith) the largest party.

Despite the optimism of the Free Soilers, Van Buren carried no electoral votes, finishing a distant third behind Cass and Taylor. His 10.13% of the popular vote, however, represents a dramatic improvement on Birney's 1844 result, owing largely to his popularity with antislavery Democrats. The National Liberty Party attracted sparse support; Smith received votes in only four states, including his native New York, where he polled 2,454 votes (0.56%). The Free Soil platform of 1848 provided the policy basis for the antislavery coalition that would come to power in the election of 1860 as the Republican Party.

== Works cited ==
- Sewell, Richard (1964). "John P. Hale and the Liberty Party, 1847-1848". The New England Quarterly. 37 (2). MIT Press: 200–23. doi:10.2307/364011. JSTOR 364011.
