= Samuel Lewis (educator) =

American educator

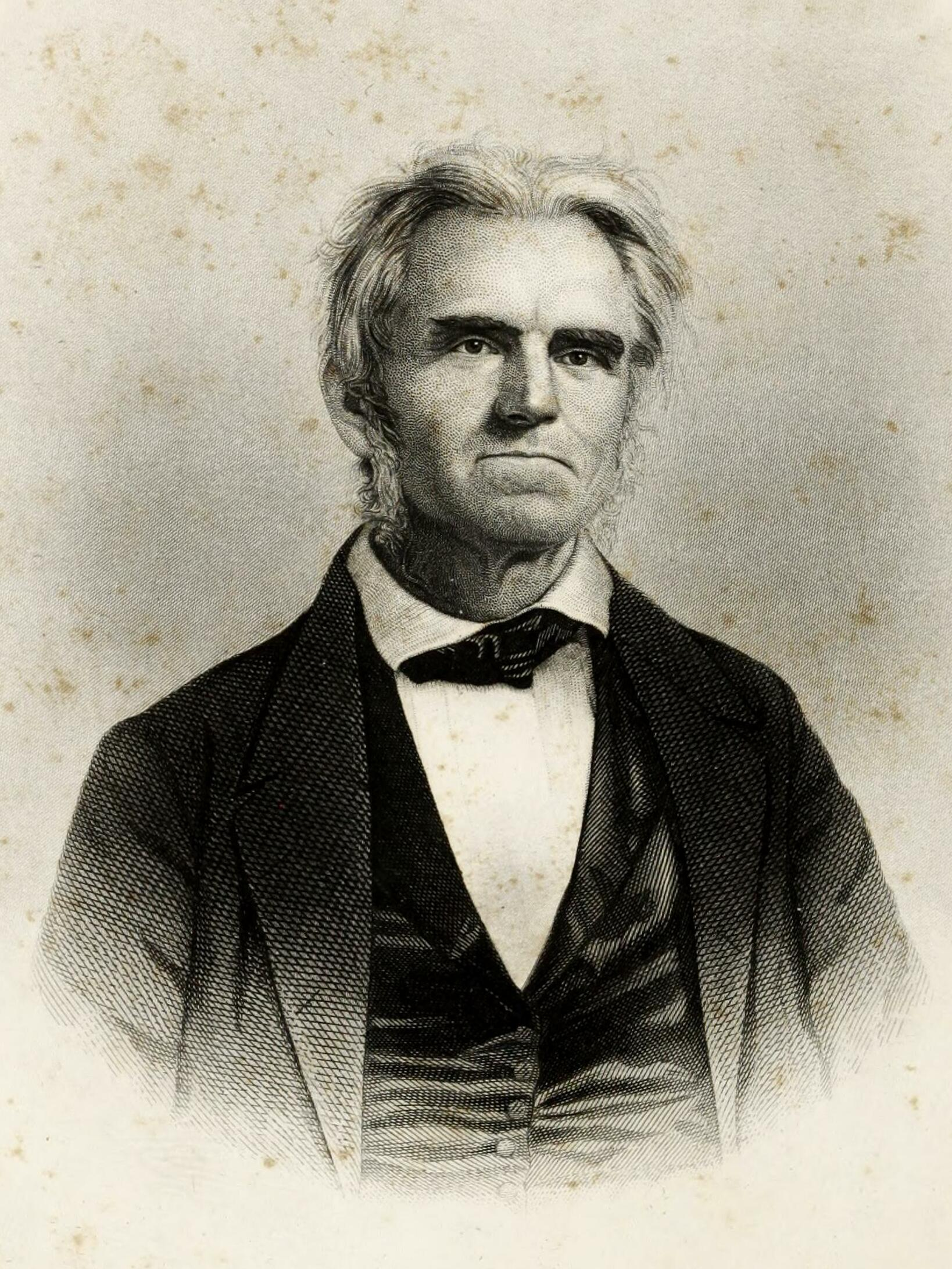
Samuel Lewis

Samuel Lewis (March 17, 1799 - July 28, 1854) was an American educator, lawyer, and politician, who from 1837 to 1840 served as Ohio's first state superintendent of common schools. He was also one of the candidates for Free Soil Party's vice-presidential nomination in the 1852 US presidential election.

Born in Falmouth, Massachusetts, his father, Samuel Lewis Sr., was the captain of a sea vessel. In 1813 the family migrated west and settled in Cincinnati, where young Samuel took up the study of law, and was admitted to the bar in 1822. As a young lawyer one of Lewis's clients was the Cincinnati philanthropist William Woodward, and in 1826, when Woodward endowed a fund to create one of the first free public schools in America, the historic Woodward Free Grammar School. Lewis was made a trustee of the school for life, with the power of appointing his successor. Notable educators associated with this school in its early days include Joseph Ray and William McGuffey, the author of the McGuffey's Readers. In 1831 Lewis was one of the organizers of an annual teachers' institute that met in Cincinnati for many years, and in 1837, when the state legislature created the office of Superintendent of Common Schools, Lewis was named the first incumbent of the office for a three-year term. During his term in office he is said to have visited 300 schools, traveling on horseback. More than 1400 new schoolhouses were constructed in Ohio during his tenure. His report to the Ohio legislature requested additional teacher pay and the need for small class size.

After leaving office Lewis, who up to that time had been a Whig, affiliated with the abolitionist Liberty Party. In 1846 he stood for office as the Liberty Party's candidate for governor of Ohio, coming in a distant third in the final canvass behind the Whig and Democratic nominees, with 11,000 votes. In 1851 he was once again an unsuccessful candidate for governor, this time as the nominee of the Free Soil party, polling 17,000 votes. In 1852 he attended the national convention of the Free Soil party where his name was put forward as a candidate for the party's vice-presidential nomination; he withdraw after coming in second to the eventual nominee, George W. Julian, on the first ballot. In 1853 he ran again as the Free Soil nominee for governor, increasing his vote total to 50,346. He died on July 28, 1854, of a typhoid fever, at the age of 55.
