= 1844 Ohio gubernatorial election =

- October 8, 1844
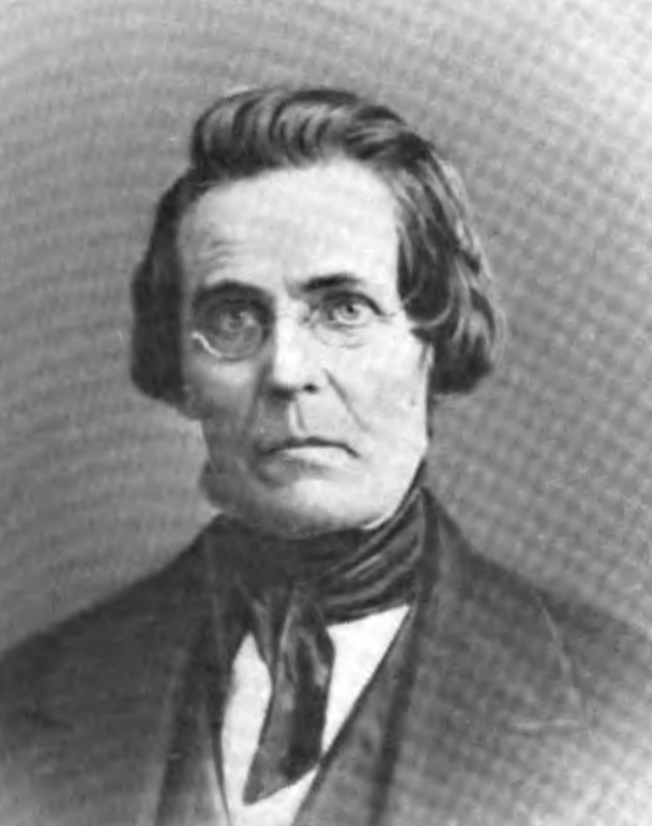

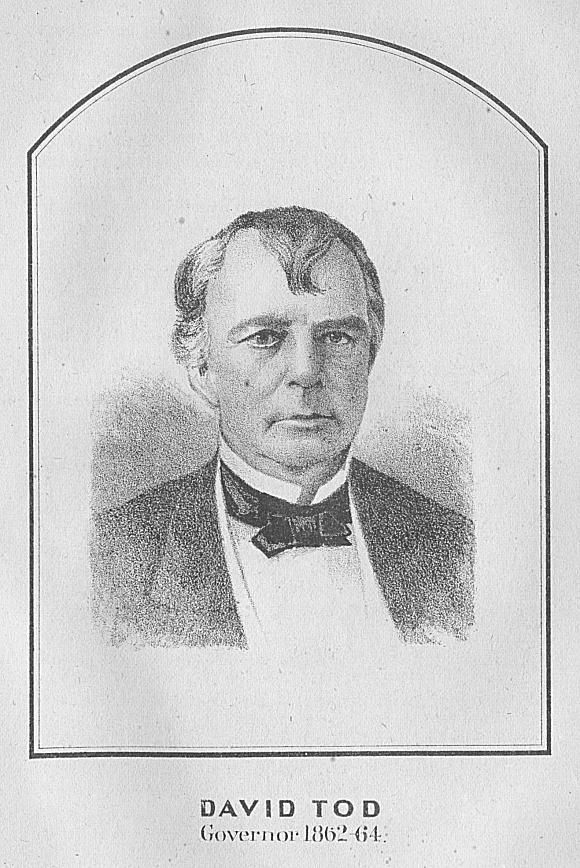
Nominee	Mordecai Bartley	David Tod
Party	Whig	Democratic
Popular vote	146,333	145,062
Percentage	48.73%	48.31%
County results
Bartley
40–50%
50–60%
60–70%
Tod
40–50%
50–60%
60–70%
70–80%
Governor before election
Thomas W. Bartley (acting)
Democratic
Elected Governor
Mordecai Bartley
Whig

The 1844 Ohio gubernatorial election was held on October 8, 1844.

Incumbent Democratic Governor Thomas W. Bartley did not run for re-election.

Bartley's father, Whig nominee Mordecai Bartley, defeated Democratic nominee David Tod and Liberty nominee Leicester King.

== General election ==
=== Candidates ===
- Mordecai Bartley, former U.S. representative from Mansfield (Whig)
- Leicester King, former state senator from Warren and nominee for governor in 1842 (Liberty)
- David Tod, former state senator from Warren (Democratic)

Bartley replaced David Spangler, who declined the nomination.

=== Results ===
1844 Ohio gubernatorial election (Note: King's vote is that declared by the General Assembly. The sum of his votes county-by-county is 8,891.)
Party	Candidate	Votes	%	±%
Whig	Mordecai Bartley	146,333	48.73%	
Democratic	David Tod	145,062	48.31%	
Liberty	Leicester King	8,898	2.96%	
Scattering		11	0.00%	
Majority		1,271	0.42%	
Turnout		300,304		
Whig gain from Democratic		Swing		
