= National Union Party (United States) =

American Civil War-era political coalition

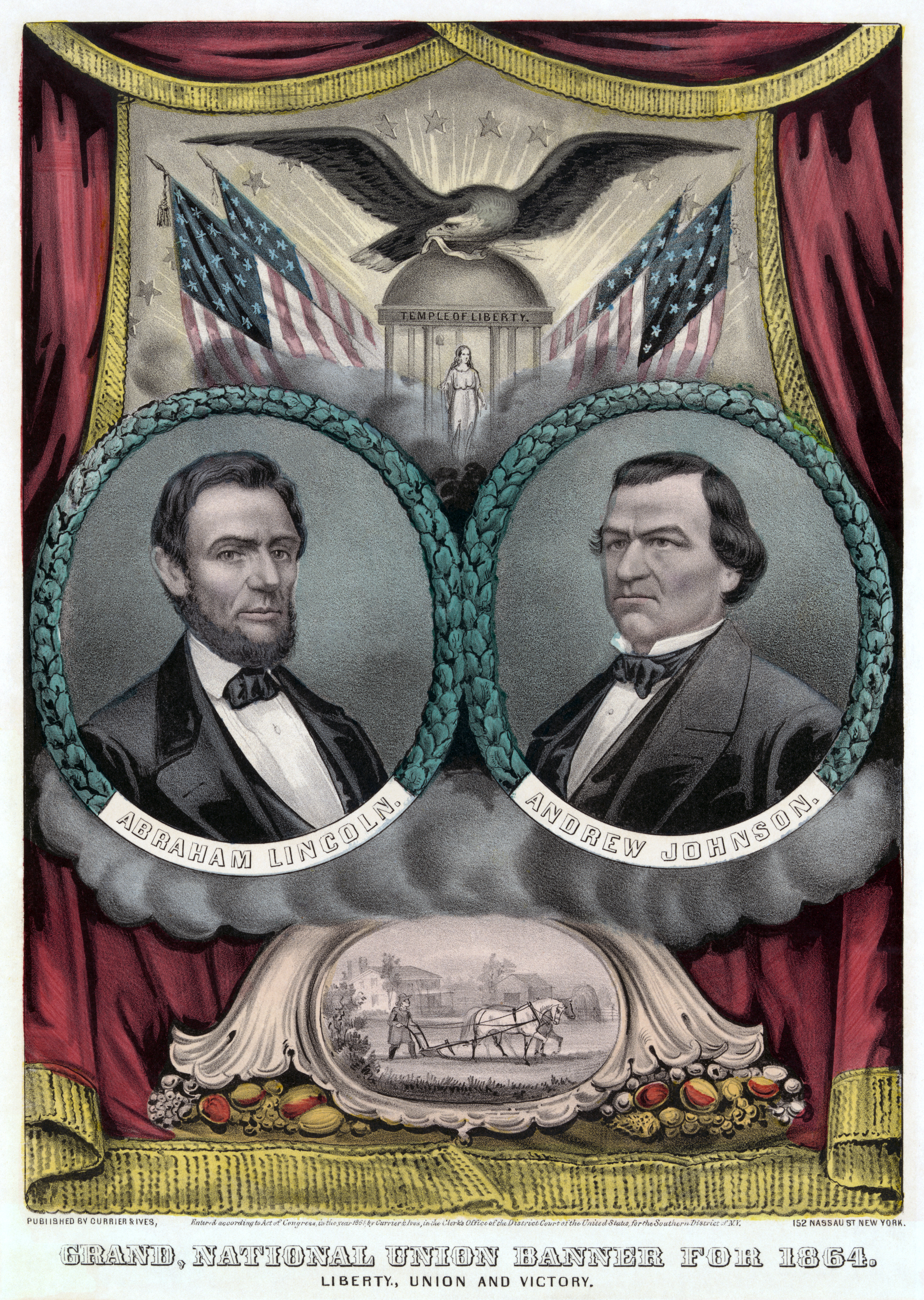
- 1864 National Union Party campaign banner
- Chairperson: Henry Jarvis Raymond
- U.S. Presidents: Abraham Lincoln; Andrew Johnson
- Founded: 1861; 165 years ago
- Dissolved: 1867; 159 years ago
- Merger of: Republican Party; War Democrats; Unconditional Union Party
- Succeeded by: Republican Party
- Ideology: Unionism; Abolitionism (US); Antipartisanship; Nationalism (US); Factions: Conservatism (US); Radicalism (US)
- Senate: 40 / 52 (1865, peak)
- House of Representatives: 147 / 192 (1865, peak)

The National Union Party, commonly known as the Union Party, and sometimes as the Republican–Union coalition, was a coalition of Republicans, War Democrats, and Unconditional Unionists that supported the Lincoln administration during the American Civil War. It held the 1864 National Union Convention that nominated Abraham Lincoln for president and Andrew Johnson for vice president in the 1864 United States presidential election. Following Lincoln's assassination, Johnson tried and failed to sustain the Union Party as a vehicle for his presidential ambitions. The party did not contest the 1868 United States elections, but the Republican Party continued to use the "Union" label in subsequent elections.

Lincoln won the 1860 United States presidential election, polling 180 electoral votes and 53 percent of the popular vote in the free states; opposition to Lincoln was divided, with most northern Democrats voting for the Illinois senator Stephen Douglas. Following his inauguration, Lincoln sought support from Douglas Democrats and Southern Unionists for his wartime policies. He encouraged the formation of bipartisan Union coalitions in the loyal states that replaced the Republican Party throughout much of the North. Besides allowing voters of diverse pre-war partisan allegiances to act collectively, the Union label served a valuable propaganda purpose by implying the coalition's opponents were dis-unionists.

The preeminent policy of the Union Party was the preservation of the Union by the prosecution of the war to its ultimate conclusion. They rejected proposals for a negotiated peace as humiliating and ultimately ruinous to the authority of the national government. The party's 1864 platform called for the abolition of slavery by constitutional amendment, a "liberal and just" immigration policy, completion of the transcontinental railroad, and condemned the French intervention in Mexico as dangerous to republicanism.

== Background ==
=== Antebellum, 1850–59 ===
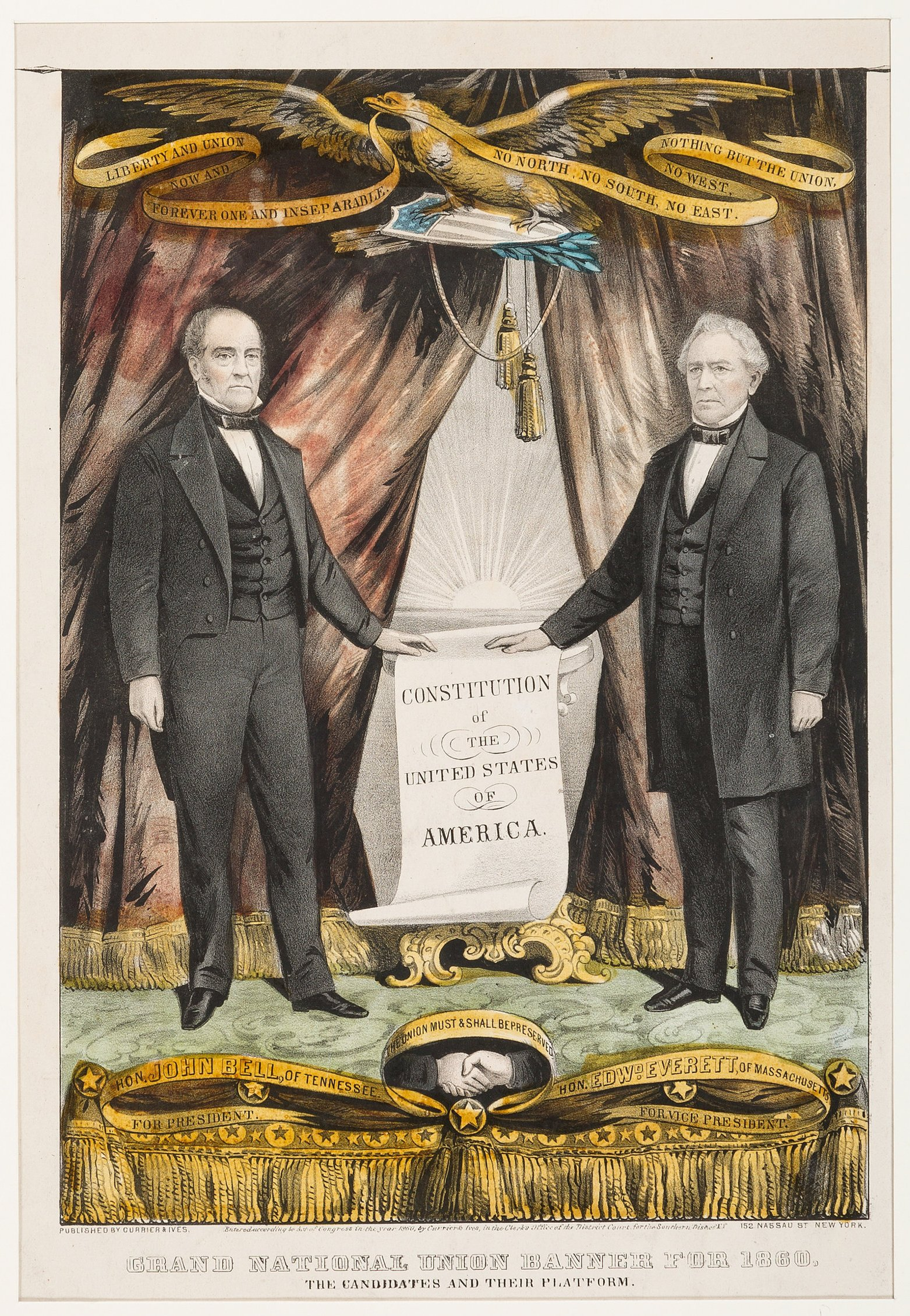
John Bell (left) and Edward Everett, candidates of the Constitutional Union Party in 1860

Political leaders made several attempts to organize a "Union Party" after 1850. Daniel Webster and others envisioned the Union Party as a vehicle for conservatives to support the Compromise of 1850. The movement failed to attract significant national support, but some state parties remained active into the 1850s. Northern opposition to the Kansas–Nebraska Act contributed to the collapse of the Whig Party in 1854, leading antislavery factions to organize the Republican Party. Republican John C. Fremont lost the 1856 United States presidential election but won the popular vote in the free states, making the Republicans the largest party in the North. However, some former Whigs remained outside the Republican Party, in part because of the party's ties to abolitionism. Many of these conservatives supported the Constitutional Union Party in the 1860 presidential election. The Constitutional Union candidates carried Kentucky, Tennessee, and Virginia, ran second in the remaining slave states, and won 14% of the popular vote in Massachusetts, but the Republicans won the votes of most former Whigs and thus the election.

Antiparty ideology was widespread in Antebellum America, even as political parties played a central role in the nation's political culture. During the 1850s, observers attributed rising sectionalism and radicalization to political parties that placed group interest before the common good. Simultaneously, a belief that the survival of the nation depended on the outcome of partisan elections encouraged Americans to see partisan opponents as enemies of the Union. The "Union Party" proposal appealed to both ideals by marketing itself as a nonpartisan coalition of loyal citizens, while identifying opponents as potentially disloyal.

=== Secession Crisis, 1860–61 ===
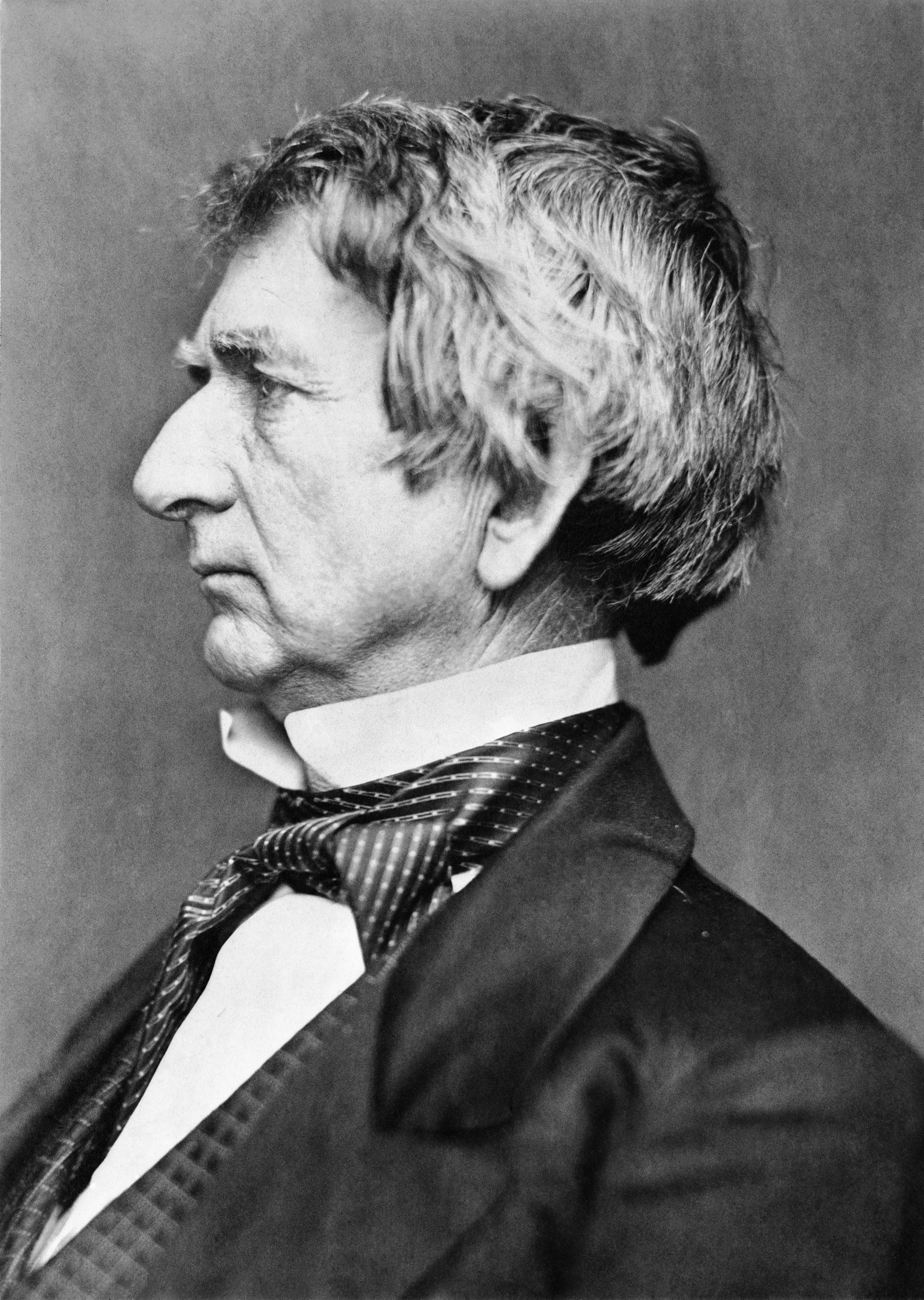
William H. Seward, secretary of state in Lincoln's administration and a key contributor to the Union Party strategy

Lincoln's election precipitated the secession of 11 slave states between December 1860 and June 1861, plunging the nation into an unprecedented political crisis. Lincoln owed his election to conservative ex-Whigs in Indiana, Illinois, and Pennsylvania, who maintained a strained relationship with the Republican Party's radical wing. He received few votes in the border states and none in 10 states that later joined the Confederacy, where Douglas made a late appeal for unionist votes. Any attempt to restore national authority and mobilize support for the war effort would therefore require Lincoln to unite with those who shared his unionist orientation but could not be easily integrated within existing Republican organizations.

In the months between Lincoln's election and inauguration, conservatives urged the incoming administration to break with the Republican Party in order to facilitate an alliance with Southern moderates that could restore the Union and avert a civil war. They claimed that most white Southerners still opposed secession, but that differences regarding slavery prevented them from cooperating with the Republican Party. A new conservative party would remove this obstacle by making preservation of the Union the only test of loyalty to the administration. At a dinner in honor of the French ambassador to the United States, William H. Seward, soon to be secretary of state in Lincoln's cabinet, charged attendees to renounce "all parties, all platforms of previous committals and whatever else will stand in the way of a restoration of the American Union." Seward and the conservatives believed that any attempt to restore the Union by force would alienate unionists in the slave states. Instead, they hoped to use the Union Party to build support for peaceful reunion on the basis of sectional compromise.

Lincoln, however, was unwilling to alienate Northern opponents of slavery to facilitate an alliance with Southern conservatives. During the winter of 1860–61, he intervened decisively to defeat the Crittenden Compromise, a set of proposed constitutional amendments that would have guaranteed the existence of slavery in perpetuity south of the 36°30′ line. Crucially, Republicans could not support the compromise package without abandoning their pledge to oppose slavery in the territories of the United States, a reversal Lincoln predicted would doom the Republican Party. Rather than court conditional unionists, as Whig president Millard Fillmore had done in 1850, Lincoln sought to recruit unconditional unionists from the border states for positions in his administration. In his first inaugural address, the new president endorsed the proposed Corwin Amendment, which would have guaranteed slavery in the slave states, but not in the territories—an offer the secessionists had already rejected. While Lincoln and his advisors knew this compromise proposal could not be accepted, it allowed them to shift the onus for war to the secessionists and "meet Disunion as patriots rather than as partizans." In this way, Lincoln laid the foundation for a future Union Party that gave cover to border state unionists to support the administration, without compromising his 1860 campaign pledge to oppose the admission of new slave states.

== History ==
=== Creation, 1861–62 ===
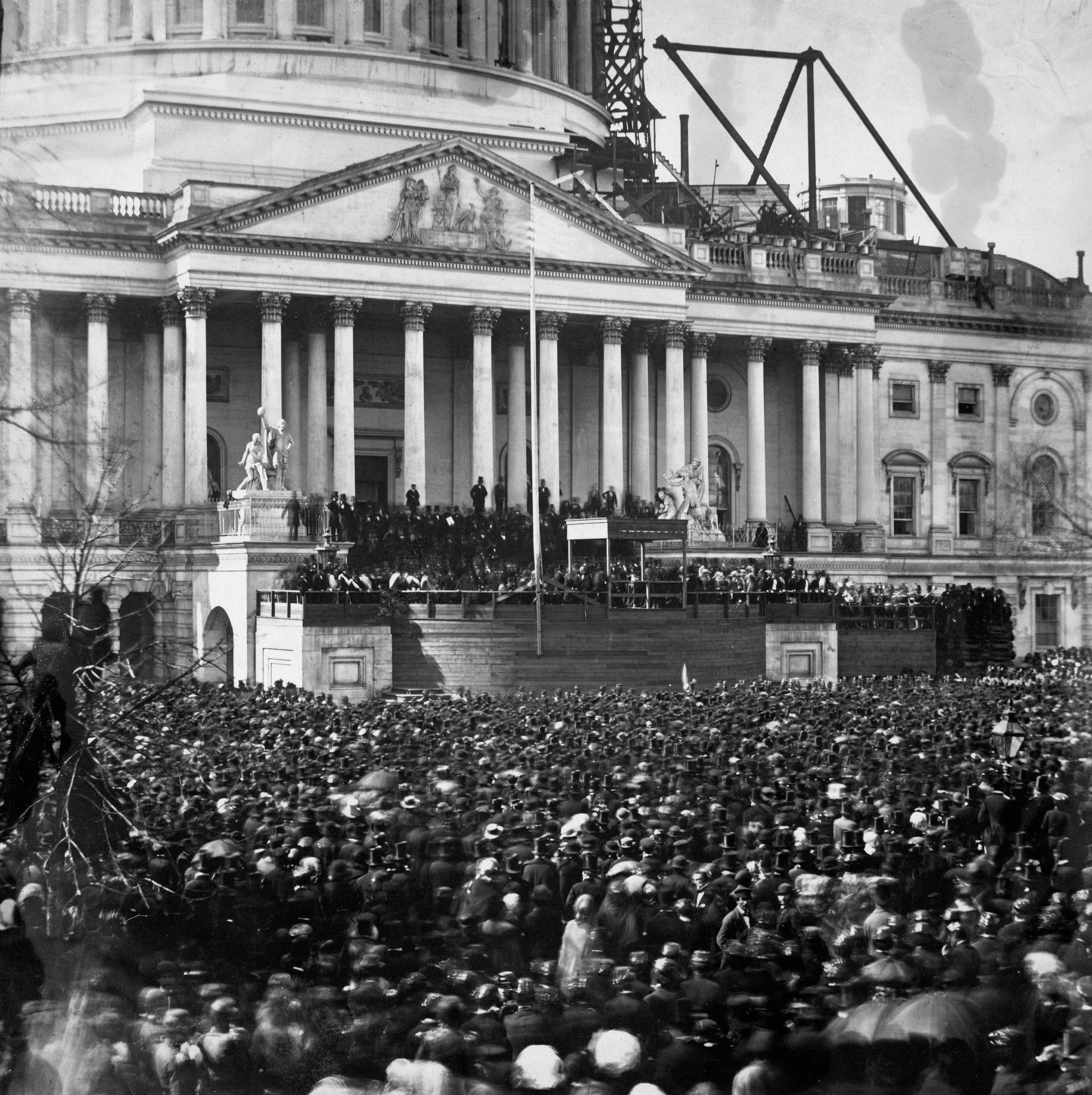
First inauguration of Abraham Lincoln at the U.S. Capitol in Washington, D.C., March 4, 1861

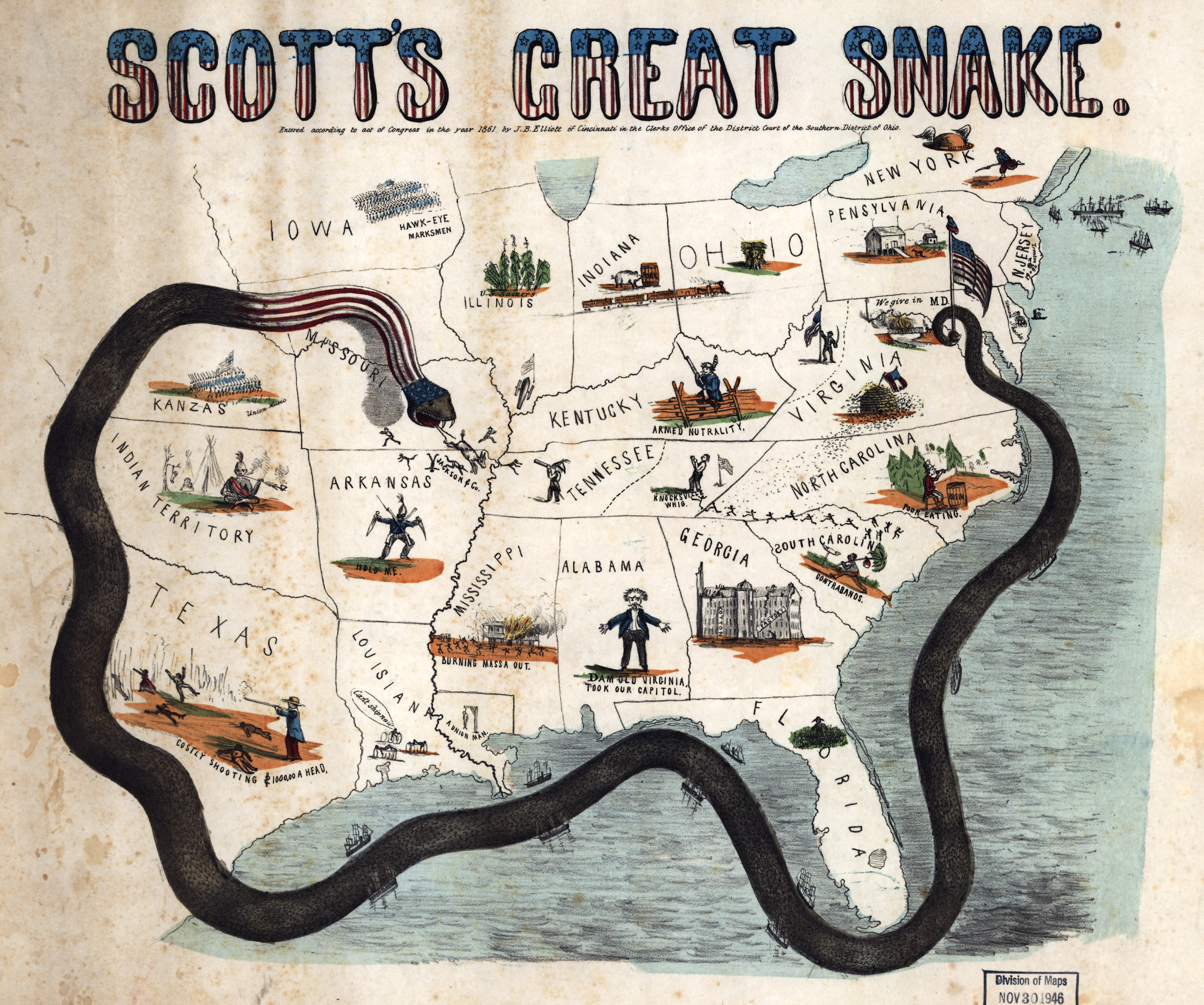
Scott's Great Snake (1861), satirical depiction of the U.S. military strategy. Southern Unionists are seen mobilizing in West Virginia and East Tennessee.

The commencement of hostilities in April 1861 dispelled the possibility of an alliance between administration supporters and conditional unionists. In short order, the Confederate bombardment and capture of Fort Sumter, Lincoln's call for 75,000 volunteers to put down the rebellion, the secession of the four upper South states, and military mobilization in the Union and the Confederacy remade the political landscape in both sections. These events had different implications for administration supporters in the free states and the loyal border states. In the latter, the immediate aim of the unionist movement was to prevent secession and install loyal governments that would cooperate with the administration. In Kentucky, Maryland, Missouri, and western Virginia, unionists organized across party lines to defeat secession during the spring and summer of 1861. Montgomery Blair and Francis Preston Blair Jr. were among those who hoped for a national political realignment in which the Union Party would replace the Republicans as the main opposition to the Democrats.

In the free states, the Union Party was a grassroots movement that called on citizens to set aside partisanship in the interest of national unity. Patriotic meetings of citizens vowed to "know no party but the Union party until the question is settled whether we have a government or not." In the first weeks of the crisis, public opinion was virtually unanimous in favor of the suspension of party politics. The rise of the peace movement following the Union defeat at the First Battle of Bull Run prompted administration supporters to form Union Party organizations ahead of the 1861 United States elections. Lincoln encouraged his supporters to join Union coalitions in 1861 and 1862, seeing the new party as a vehicle for his planned re-election campaign. In Lincoln's vision, the Union coalition would provide the basis for national reconstruction following the end of the war, which he foresaw as "preeminently a political process" that would be guided by loyal residents of the seceded states.

From the outset, the coalition strategy encountered significant Republican resistance. Michael Holt argues that Republican opposition to the Union Party "was the chief source of the disagreements between Lincoln and Congress during the war." Congressional Republicans from safe seats saw little benefit to courting Democratic and Whig voters; to the contrary, they feared efforts to conciliate conservatives would dilute the strong anti-Slave Power message on which the party had won in 1860. In Illinois, Ohio, Massachusetts, and California, the move to abandon the Republican label provoked outrage among the party faithful. Radical Republicans in particular feared losing influence to conservatives who continued to oppose the radical position on slavery and favored a restrained, conciliatory policy toward white Southerners. Radical opposition to merger with former Whigs and Democrats in the Union Party preserved the Republican Party as a separate organization in antislavery strongholds in the upper North.

The result was a partial realignment in which the Union Party absorbed—but did not extinguish—the Republican Party throughout most of the North. Party composition varied locally; several state-specific parties formed during the war, while the Republican label survived in parts of New England and the upper Midwest. In line with contemporary sources, some historians use the name "Republican–Union" to suggest the heterogenous character of the pro-administration coalition during this period.

==== Border states ====
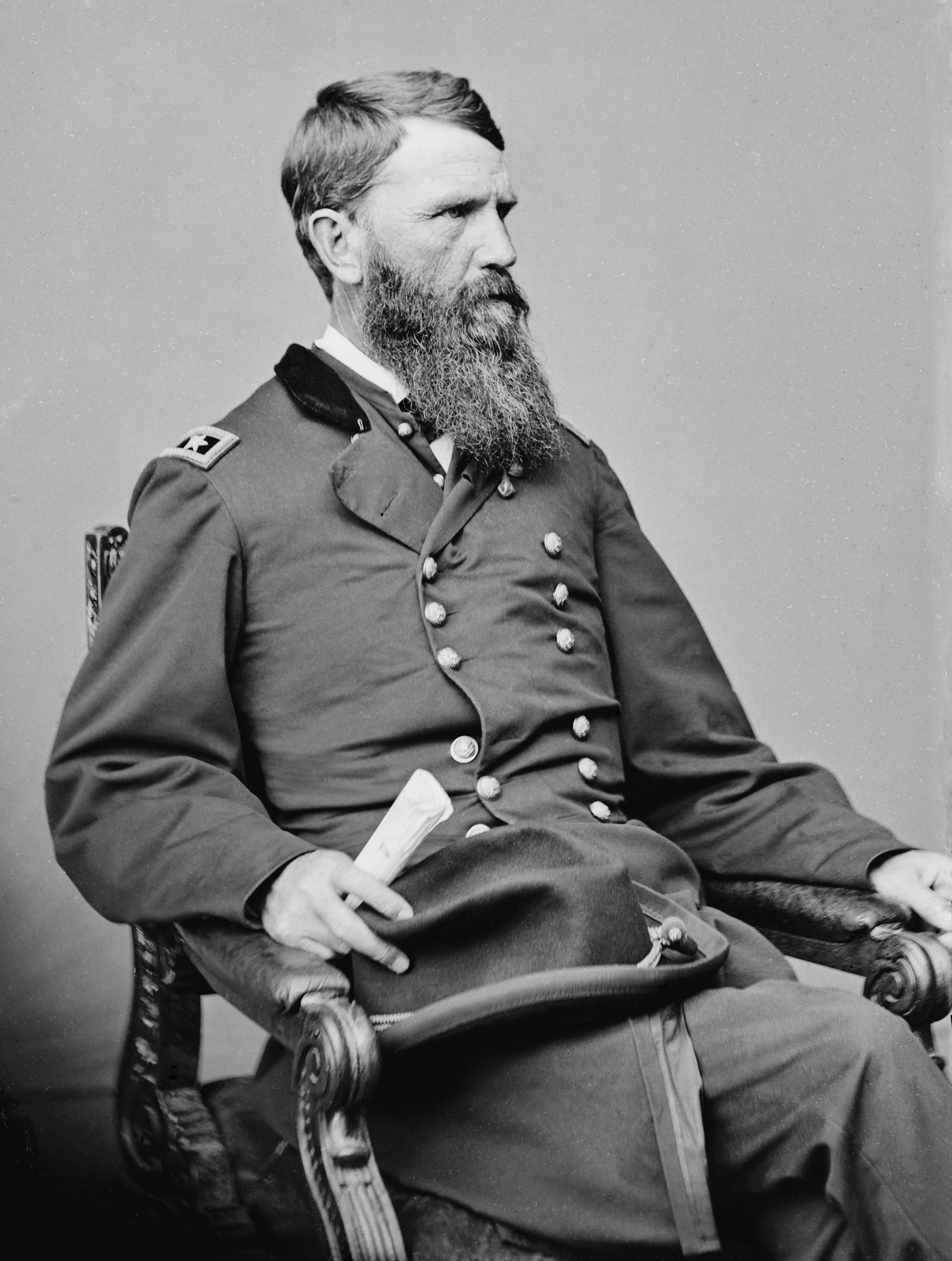
Francis Preston Blair Jr., Missouri Unionist, major general, and U.S. representative from St. Louis

Republicans polled four percent of the votes in the border states in 1860, mostly from German-Americans in St. Louis. Here, the Union Party evolved from existing anti-Democratic coalitions that included most former Whigs, Know Nothings, and unionist Democrats. Unionists won congressional elections in Kentucky and Maryland held in 1861 and controlled both chambers of the Kentucky General Assembly. In Maryland, Union Party candidate Augustus Bradford was elected governor, and Unionists carried all but six seats in the Maryland House of Delegates. In Missouri and western Virginia, unionists overthrew secessionist governments with the support of the Union Army. Postponement of statewide elections delayed party formation in Missouri, but in June 1862 a unionist political convention organized the Emancipation Party. Emancipationists swept the 1862 elections but remained closely divided between radical and conservative factions.

The Union Party in the border states distanced itself from national Republicans in 1861 due to the latter's ties to abolitionism. In Maryland, the Union Party claimed to be a patriotic organization unaffiliated with any national party. Ambitious Unionists sought to position their organization as the true "administration party" and used federal patronage to accomplish their goal. Missouri's Emancipation leaders "deemphasized party allegiances" in the call for the party's founding convention, despite the fact that many of the organizers had been Republicans before the war. By 1862, Unionists became more willing to publicly support Lincoln's administration as conservatives grew more favorable to emancipation. The 1862 Missouri elections, which sent a mix of conservative and radical Emancipationists to Congress, were interpreted by Francis P. Blair Jr. as a pro-administration victory.

==== Lower North ====
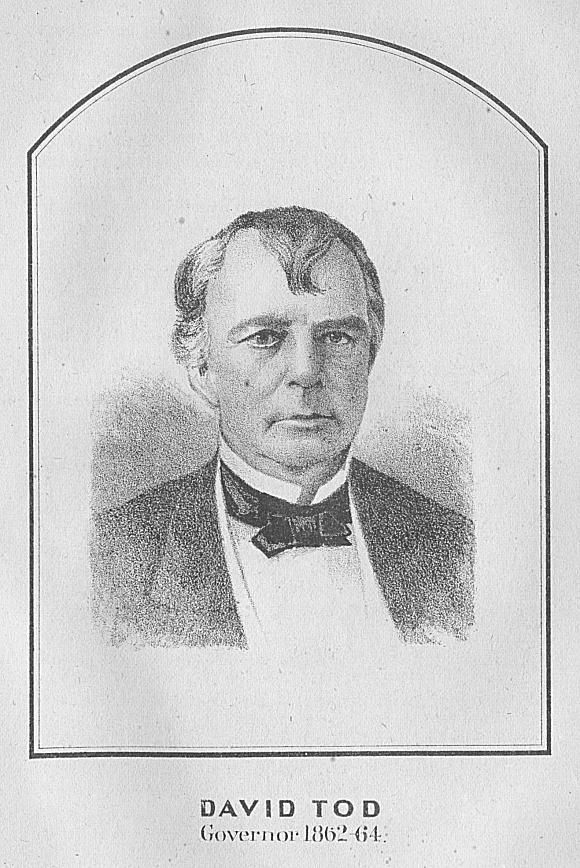
David Tod, Union Party governor of Ohio, 1862–64

In Ohio, Pennsylvania, Illinois, and Indiana, the Union Party was a coalition of Republicans and War Democrats. The Republican margin in these states was narrow and Democratic recruits supplied much-needed reinforcements for the pro-administration party. Ohio Unionists nominated Douglas Democrat David Tod for governor in 1861 on a platform endorsing the Crittenden–Johnson Resolution. Tod won the election comfortably over Democrat Hugh J. Jewett with 58 percent of the vote, representing a substantial gain over the Republicans' 1859 result. Pennsylvania's Union Party exploited factionalism in the Pennsylvania Democratic Party to forge an alliance between Republicans and disaffected Douglas Democrats. A similar situation unfolded in Indiana, where the Democratic Party was split between the supporters of U.S. senator Jesse D. Bright and former governor Joseph A. Wright. When Bright was expelled from Congress for colluding with the Confederate president Jefferson Davis, Republican governor Oliver P. Morton seized the opportunity to appoint Wright to his vacant seat and bring Wright's supporters into Indiana's nascent Union Party.

==== Upper North ====
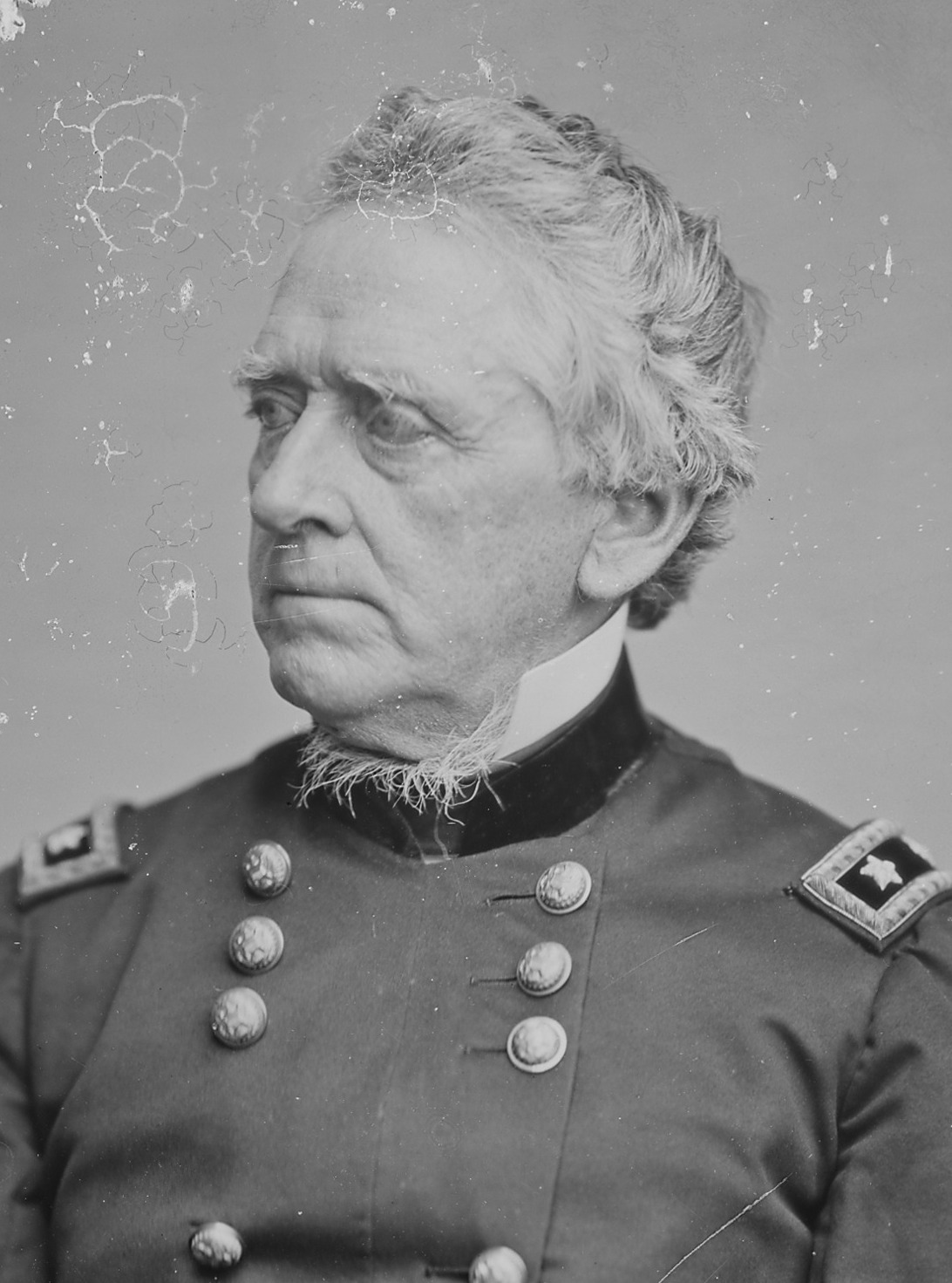
John Adams Dix, major general and Union Party politician from New York

Republican strength was greatest in New England and the upper Midwest, where radical influence impeded the growth of the Union Party. In Massachusetts, Michigan, Minnesota, and Iowa, party identities remained mostly unchanged by the war. Minnesota Republicans avoided an attempt to organize a Union ticket in their state in 1861, and governor Alexander Ramsey was re-elected as a Republican that fall. Administration supporters in Michigan still called themselves Republicans in 1862, while Democrats co-opted the Union label. Also that year, Massachusetts Republicans defeated a conservative coalition which called itself the People's Party.

Some Democrats were especially eager to distance themselves from their party's anti-war faction, producing fusion arrangements in several states. In Connecticut and Wisconsin, Republicans and War Democrats met separately and nominated a joint ticket for the 1861 elections. Republicans won three-way races against War Democrats and Peace Democrats in Maine, Vermont, and New Hampshire. In Rhode Island, Republicans faced a conservative coalition led by the wartime governor William Sprague IV, who won re-election unanimously in the first wartime election. Sprague subsequently encouraged his supporters to back the Republican candidate in the 1863 election to succeed him, precipitating a realignment that returned Republicans to power in the state.

New York was the most critical upper North state for the administration; here, War Democrats played an outsized role in the birth of the Union Party. After rejecting a Republican proposal for a nonpartisan unity ticket, the New York Democratic Party met in convention and adopted a platform condemning Lincoln's wartime policies. A minority of War Democrats walked out and held their own convention, which adopted a platform endorsing the administration's war policies and calling for loyal men of all parties to unite in the upcoming elections. The subsequent Republican–Union convention ratified the War Democrats' platform and adopted its statewide ticket with only a single change. Thus, the Union ticket in New York was dominated by former Democrats, while the majority of its supporters had been Republicans prior to 1860.

==== West ====
The pre-war Republican Party was especially weak in the Pacific states, where Lincoln gained 32 percent (in California) and 36 percent (in Oregon) of the vote, respectively, in 1860; here, as in Rhode Island, Republicans were junior partners in a Union Party coalition dominated by Douglas Democrats and Constitutional Unionists. Circumstances in Kansas produced an unusual alliance of Democrats and radical Republicans, who formed the Union Party in 1862 to oppose the controversial leadership of Jim Lane. Lane's allies dominated the regular Kansas Republican Party, which remained affiliated with the Lincoln administration. The split in the Republican ranks persisted through the end of the war.

=== Coalition, 1863 ===
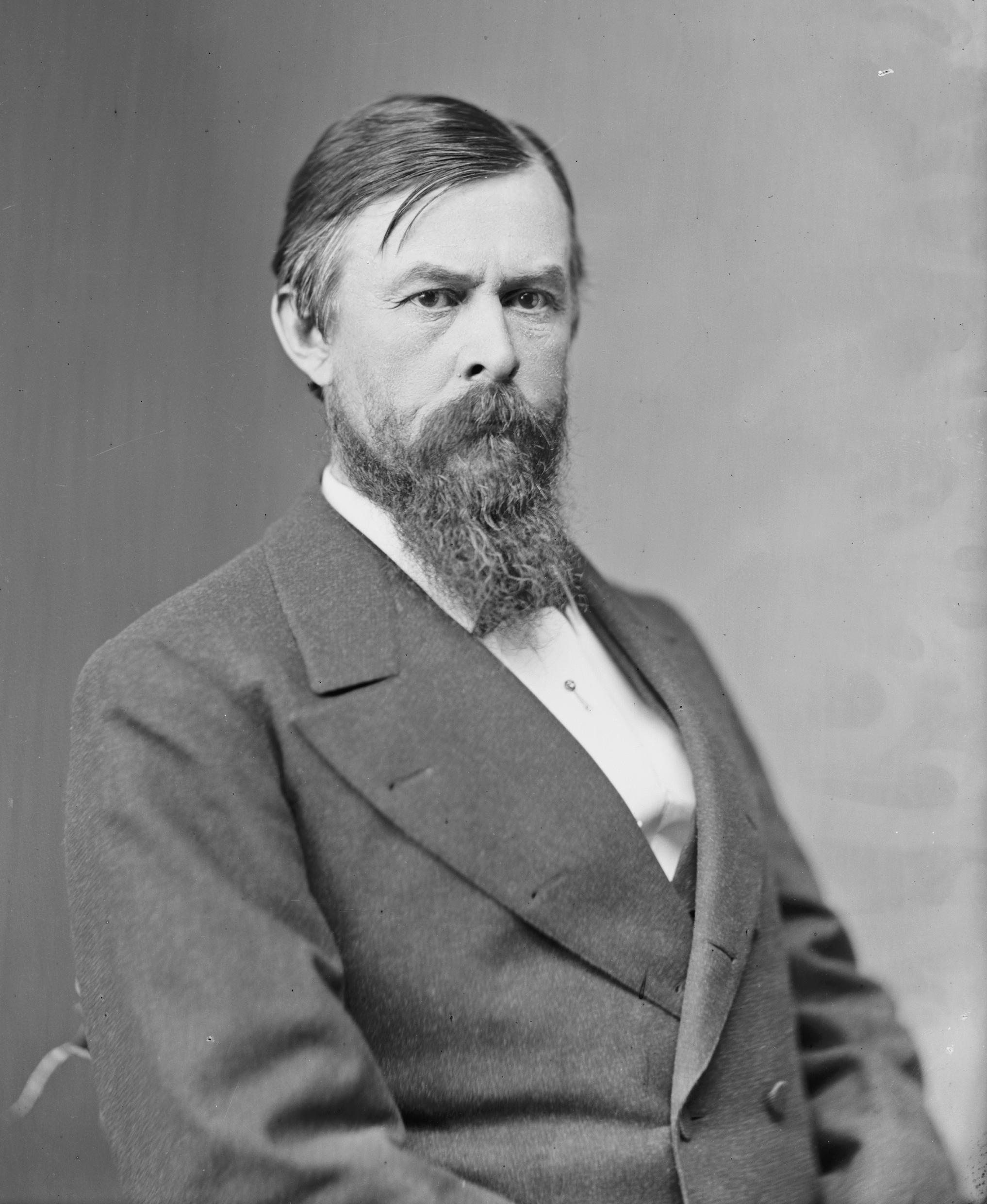
Green Clay Smith, Unconditional Unionist from Kentucky's 6th congressional district

Democrats made gains in the 1862–63 United States House of Representatives elections, aided by the rise of the peace movement and anti-abolitionist backlash to the Emancipation Proclamation. In Illinois, Indiana, Pennsylvania, and New York the electoral verdict for the administration was dire. Republican–Unionists retained a narrow majority in the lower chamber, where border state Unionists held the balance of power. The lack of absentee voting helped to depress the Republican–Union vote, as men in active military service—an overwhelmingly Republican constituency—were unable to cast ballots, contributing to Democratic victories in key down-ballot races.

The "palpable failure" of the Union Party to win over large numbers of Democrats in the lower North increased the importance of the border states to the Union Party. Unionists swept the 1862 and 1863 elections in the border states, even as the movement was increasingly divided between radicals and conservatives. Radicals won the struggle for power in Maryland, where Unconditional Unionists defeated both the Democrats and the Conservative Unionists in the 1863 congressional elections. Kentucky's Union Democratic Party narrowly avoided a schism in 1863, but after the 38th United States Congress convened in December three radical congressmen—Lucien Anderson, Green Clay Smith, and William H. Randall—crossed the floor and joined the Republican–Union coalition, laying the foundation for Kentucky's Unconditional Union Party. The situation in Missouri was chaotic, but before year's end the Radical Union Party had formed to take up the mantle of emancipation and unconditional union.

Radical strength in the border states helped to clarify the Union Party's position on emancipation and Reconstruction. The importance of conservatives in the lower North and border states to the war effort and Lincoln's hopes for reelection had put pressure on the president to moderate the Republican stance on slavery in 1861. The failure of conciliatory gestures to win over most Democrats, contrasted against strong showings for Radical Unionists in Maryland and Missouri, diminished the importance of the conservatives just as the radicals were gaining power. Lincoln's chances to carry the border states in 1864 now appeared to depend on a strong stand in favor of abolition. Over the course of 1863, Lincoln moved to align himself with the radical position on emancipation and the disenfranchisement of Confederate sympathizers in the border states, effectively eliminating intra-party discord on these issues. The terms and conditions of Reconstruction, however, remained a source of contention within the Union coalition.

The Union Party won key elections in Ohio and Pennsylvania in the fall of 1863. In Ohio, the Union candidate John Brough defeated the former U.S. representative Clement Vallandigham, a nationally prominent Peace Democrat. Vallandigham's arrest and conviction by a military court on charges of disloyalty was controversial, and he conducted his campaign while living in exile in Canada. In Pennsylvania, the incumbent governor Andrew Gregg Curtin was re-elected over Peace Democrat George Washington Woodward. Victory in these two states delivered a symbolic mandate for the administration's military and emancipation policies. Critically, Vallandigham's prominence as an opponent of the war in a campaign that functioned as a referendum on the Emancipation Proclamation allowed Unionists to equate anti-abolitionism with disunion. Woodward's public stand against absentee voting for soldiers, meanwhile, reinforced the public perception of Democratic disloyalty and contributed to the strong swing of military voters toward the Union Party.

=== Re-election, 1864 ===
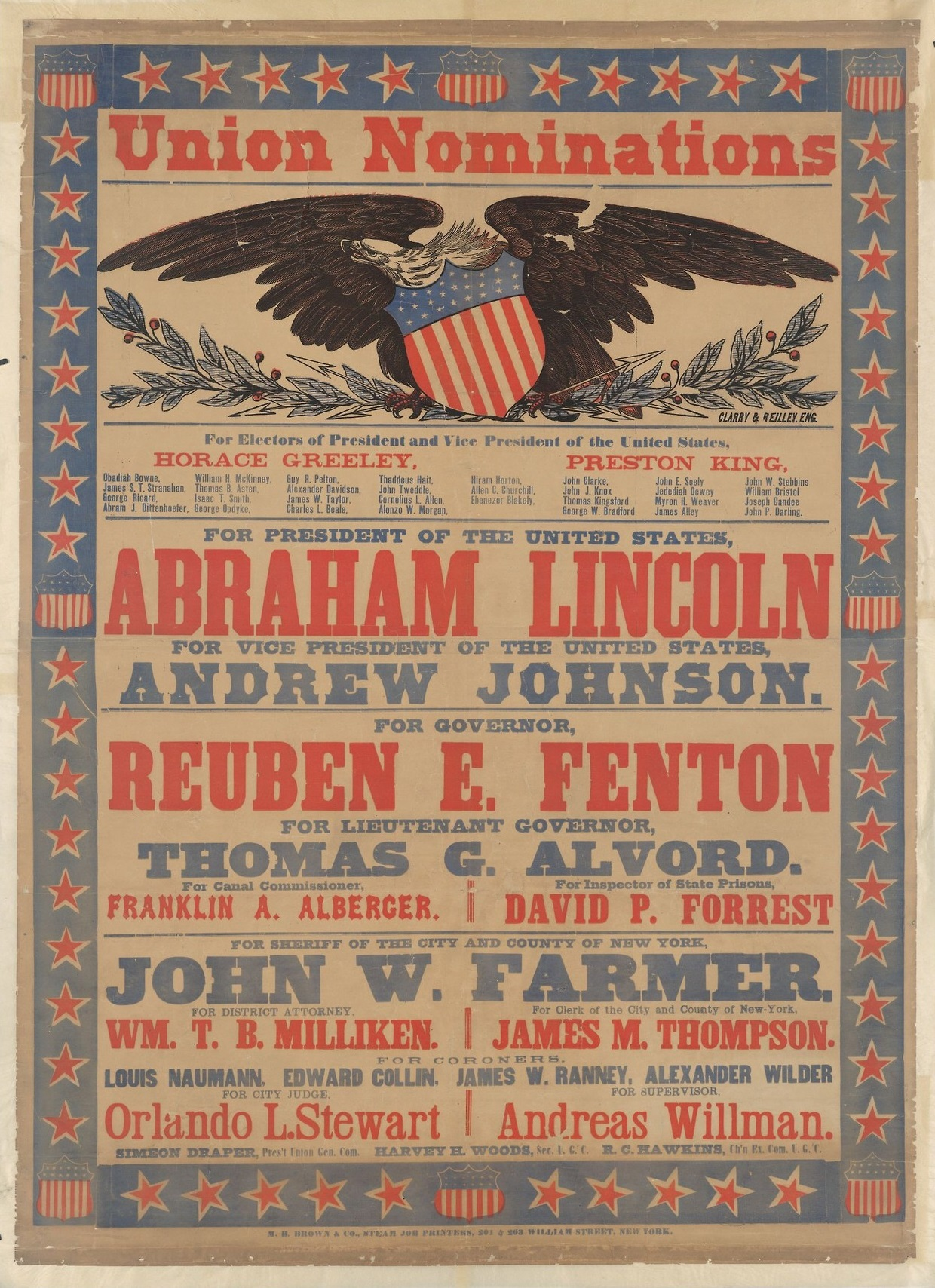
1864 Union Party nominations in New York.

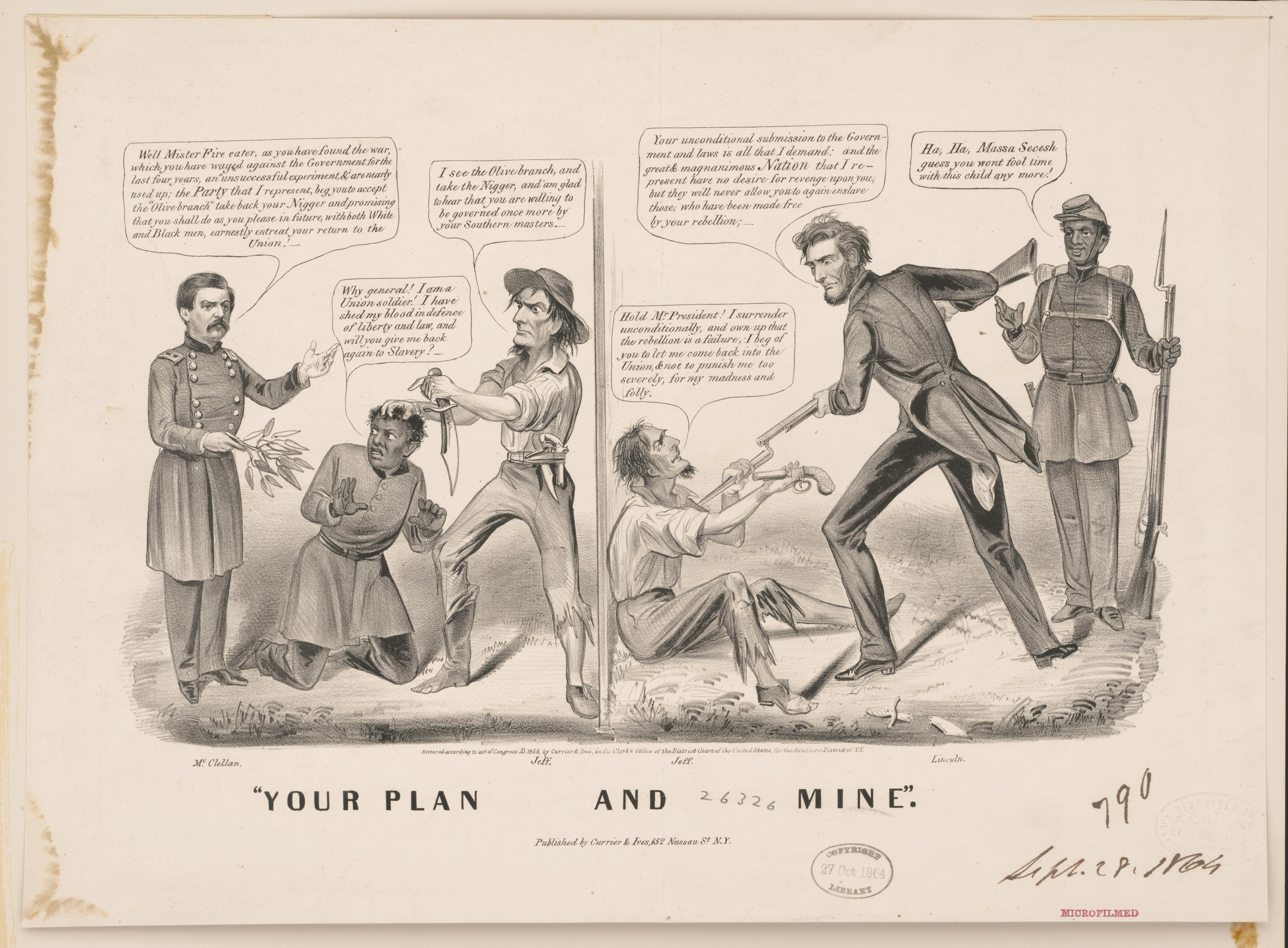
Your Plan and Mine (1864), Union Party political cartoon contrasting Lincoln's Reconstruction policy with that of the Democratic presidential candidate, George B. McClellan

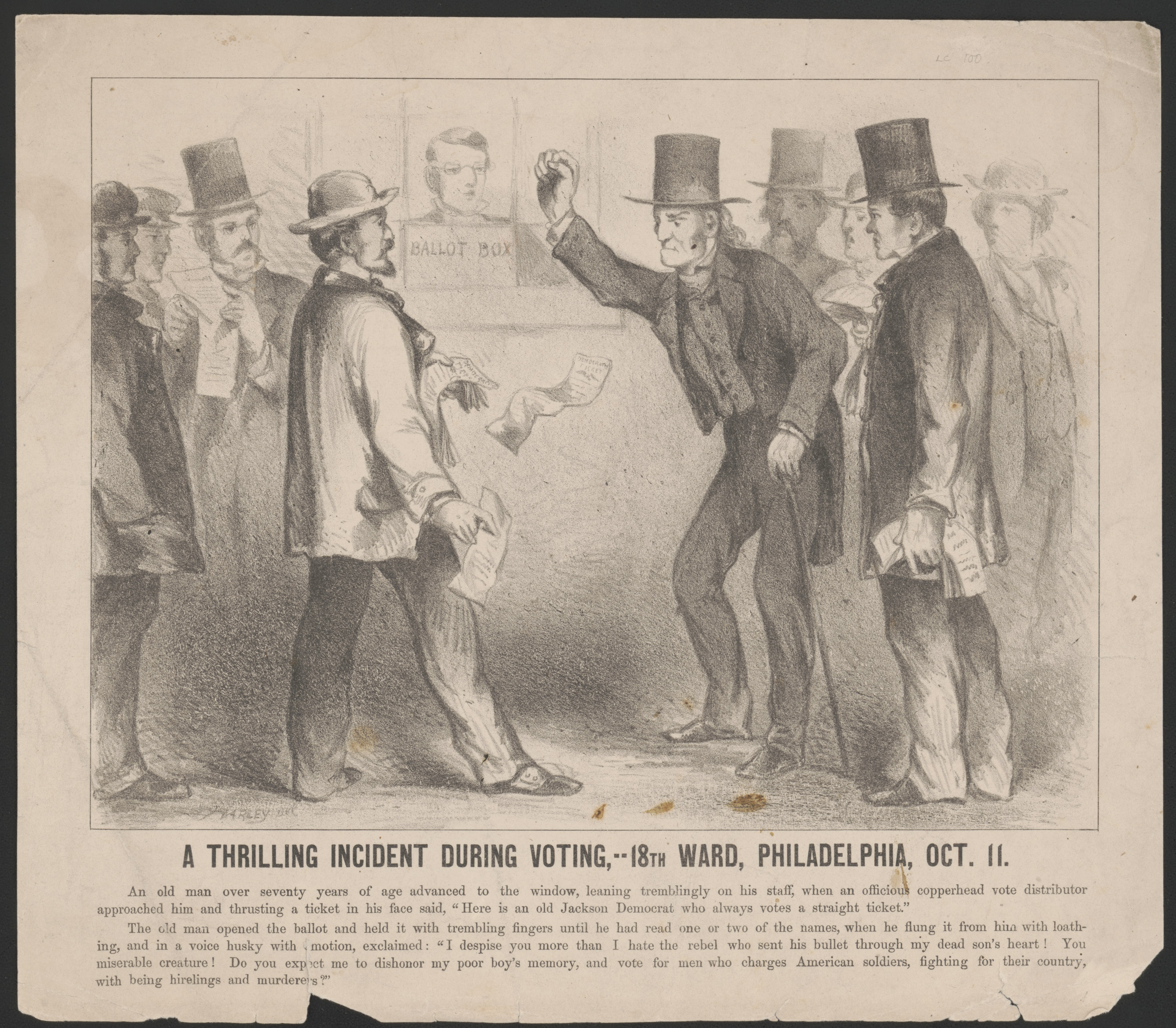
A Thrilling Incident in Voting (1864). An elderly War Democrat refuses the entreaties of a Peace Democrat to support the Democratic ticket in the 1864 state elections in Pennsylvania.

Delegates of the National Union Party held their national convention in Baltimore on June 6–7, 1864. The attendees included Republicans, War Democrats, conservative former Whigs and Know Nothings, Unconditional Unionists, and representatives from every section of the country. Anti-partisanship was a major theme of the proceedings, and several speakers celebrated the diversity of the Union coalition. Lincoln was nominated unanimously on the first ballot. (The Missouri delegation initially voted for Ulysses S. Grant but switched their votes before the end of balloting.) The convention nominated the military governor of Tennessee Andrew Johnson for vice president. Johnson, a Southern unionist and former Democrat, defeated the Republican incumbent vice president Hannibal Hamlin and the Democratic former U.S. senator from New York Daniel S. Dickinson for the nomination; his selection emphasized the nonpartisan and bisectional premise of the Union Party.

Differing views on Reconstruction posed a major issue that threatened to split the Union coalition in 1864. In December 1863, Lincoln issued the Proclamation of Amnesty and Reconstruction to guide the restoration of U.S. civilian authority in the Confederacy. The so-called "Ten Percent Plan" provided for the resumption of civil government in states where 10 percent of the voting population pledged loyalty to the United States and accepted Congressional and executive actions relating to slavery. The proclamation did not guarantee the political or civil rights of freedpeople, but permitted states to adopt "temporary arrangement[s]" with respect to freedpeople "consistent ... with their present condition as a laboring, landless, and homeless class." Lincoln's handling of Reconstruction was a major point of contention with abolitionists and Congressional Republican–Unionists, who favored stronger guarantees of the rights of freedpeople and considered the proclamation overly lenient to former Confederates. The creation of reconstructed governments in Arkansas, Louisiana, and Tennessee raised fears that Lincoln intended to circumvent Congress and reestablish the Antebellum political order with virtually no changes. These fears were seemingly confirmed when Lincoln pocket vetoed the Wade-Davis Bill, prompting swift congressional condemnation.

Radical opposition to Lincoln's Reconstruction policy nearly produced a schism at several points during the campaign. Prior to the Baltimore convention, some radicals favored the candidacy of Salmon P. Chase as an alternative to Lincoln. Chase's candidacy failed to gain momentum, as did the attempt by Missouri's Radical Union Party to substitute Grant at the National Union Convention. At Baltimore, an effort to seat delegates from the seceded states met with furious radical opposition. Pennsylvania delegate Thaddeus Stevens argued that seating the Southern delegates would set a precedent for restoring those states' representation in Congress; ultimately, the Arkansas, Louisiana, and Tennessee delegations were seated, while those from Florida, South Carolina, and Virginia were not. Most seriously, a convention of abolitionists and German-American radicals met at Cleveland on May 31 and nominated John C. Fremont as the presidential candidate of the Radical Democratic Party. The Fremont movement attracted little popular support, but threatened to become a rallying point for anti-Lincoln Republicans in the event that radicals bolted the Union Party.

Meanwhile, conservatives who since 1863 had grown increasingly alienated from Lincoln over the president's position on slavery plotted to resurrect the Constitutional Union Party as a haven for conservative Republicans, ex-Whigs, and War Democrats. Led by Robert C. Winthrop, they planned to outmaneuver the peace movement and force the Democrats to accept a Conservative Union candidate on a platform committed to the restoration of the Union without emancipation. Many hoped that Millard Fillmore could be drafted to run as the conservative candidate, but the former president declined a third bid for re-election. The national committee of the Conservative Union Party met at Philadelphia on December 24, 1863, and nominated George B. McClellan for president and William B. Campbell for vice president. McClellan was subsequently nominated by the 1864 Democratic National Convention, but the party's platform which called for the immediate cessation of hostilities followed by a convention of the states to negotiate the terms of national reunion. While McClellan subsequently repudiated the peace plank, his acceptance of the Democratic nomination under such circumstances effectively ended the conservative splinter movement.

While despairing of success for much of the summer, Lincoln's reelection prospects brightened significantly following the Union Army victory in the Atlanta campaign. The fall of Atlanta abruptly terminated the movement for a second Republican–Union convention and precipitated Fremont's withdrawal from the race in late September. (Note: Smith gives the date of Fremont's withdrawal as September 23, while McPherson says September 22.) Having proclaimed the war a failure, the changing tide caught the Democrats flat-footed. On election day, Lincoln won a resounding victory, carrying all but three of the loyal states and 55 percent of the popular vote.

As the magnitude of Lincoln's electoral margin became known in the days following the election, it became apparent that the Unionists had achieved a historic victory. Lincoln carried all of the important battleground states in the lower North, including Indiana, Ohio, and Pennsylvania. He narrowly carried Connecticut and New York, largely due to the soldier vote, which broke four to one in favor of Lincoln. The Union Party swept state elections held throughout the fall of 1864, including the critical gubernatorial race in Indiana, where the incumbent Morton narrowly defeated his Democratic challenger with the help of soldier ballots. Unionists formed a three-fourths majority in the new House of Representatives, more than reversing the losses of 1862. In the border states, Lincoln captured 54 percent of the overall vote and carried Maryland, Missouri, and West Virginia, while Delaware and Kentucky fell in the Democratic column.

==== Gallery: 1864 Lincoln and Johnson election tickets ====
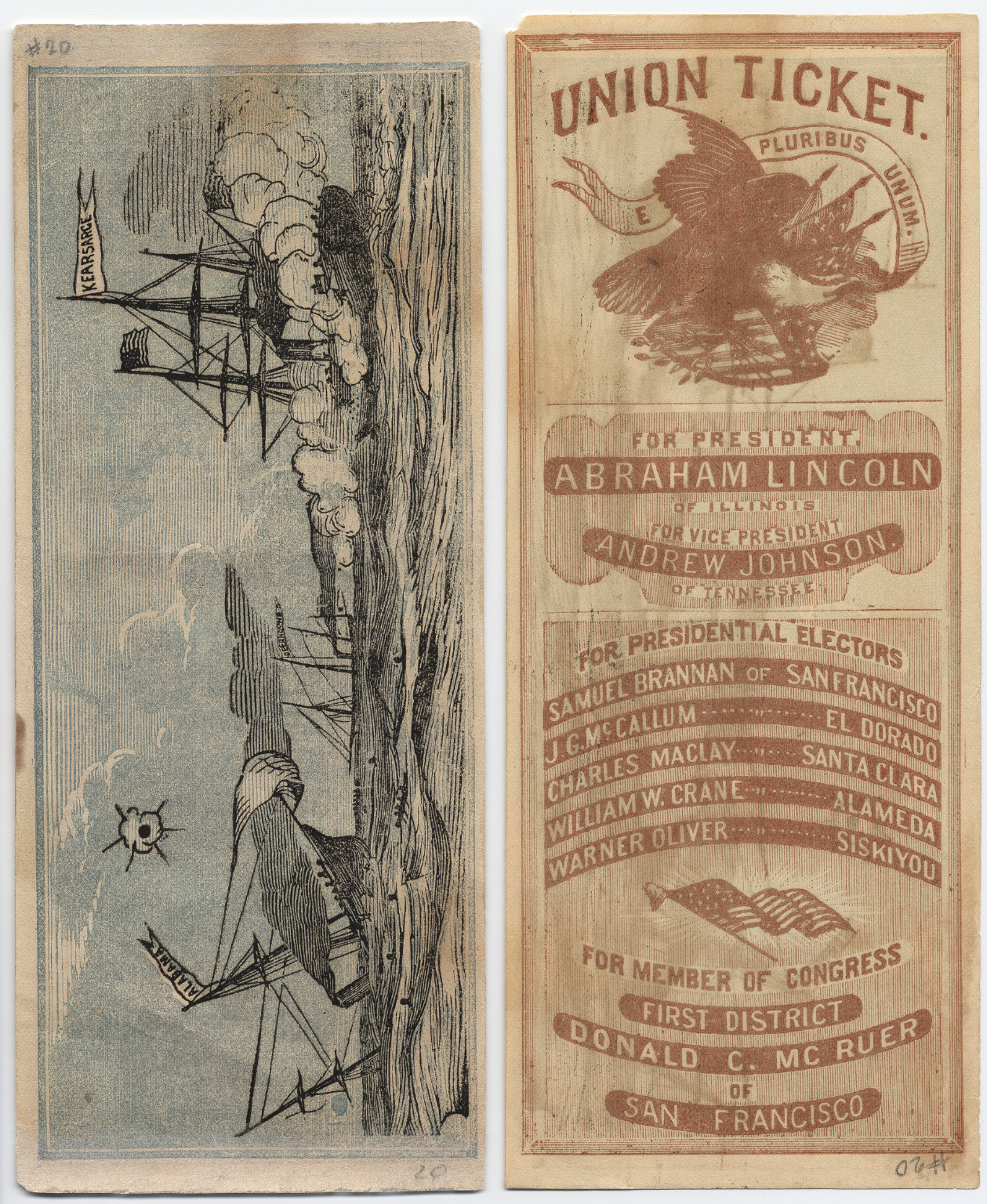
California

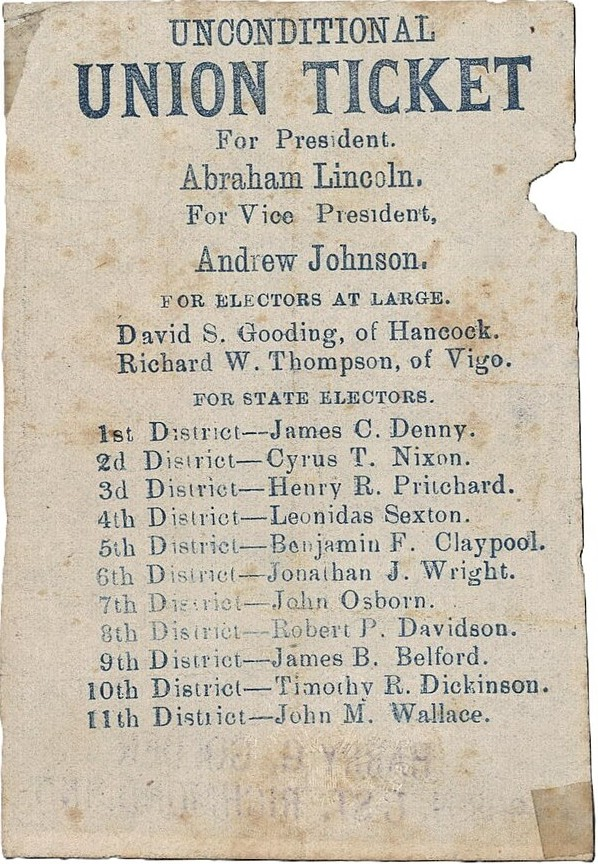
Indiana

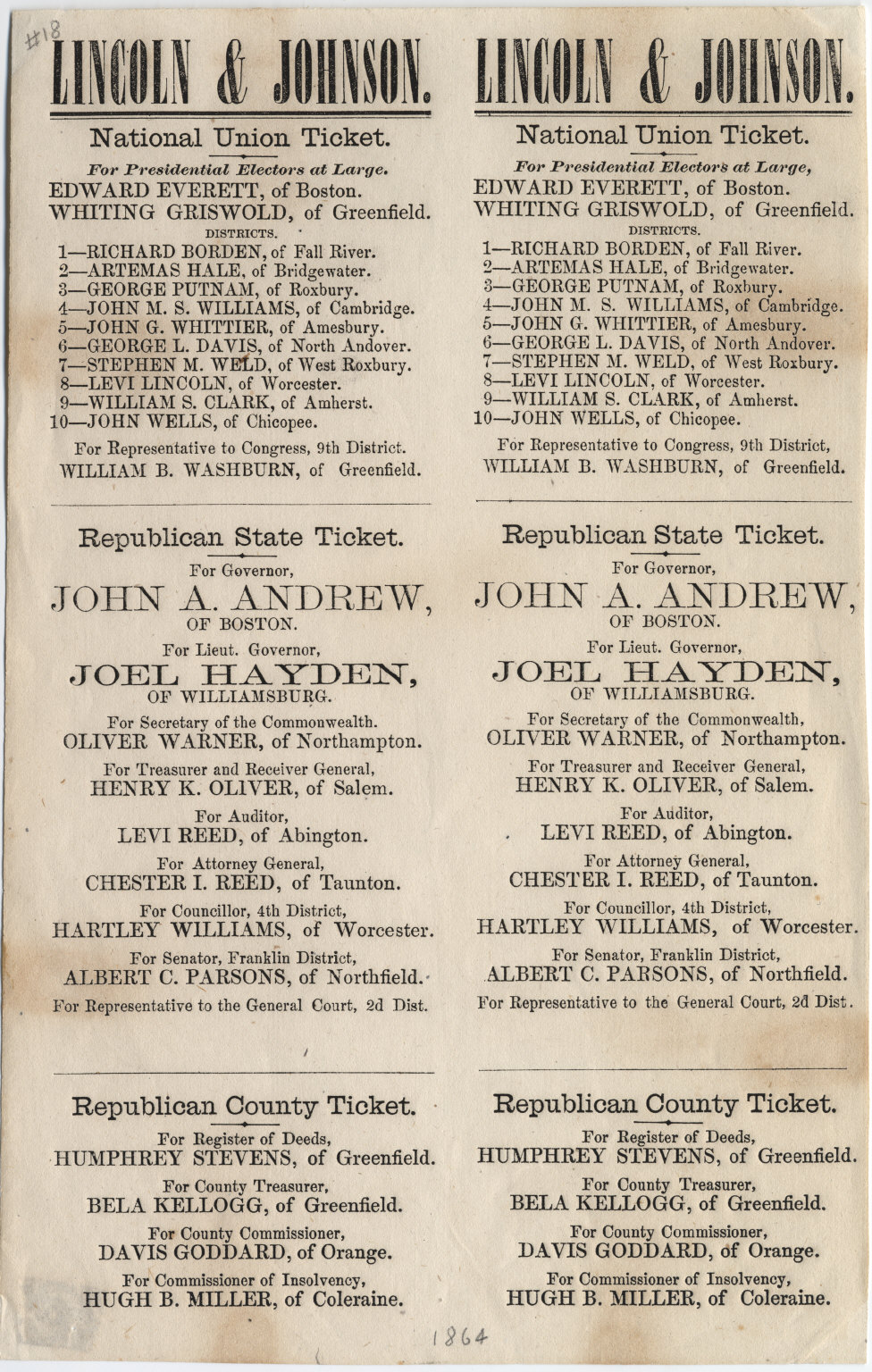
Massachusetts

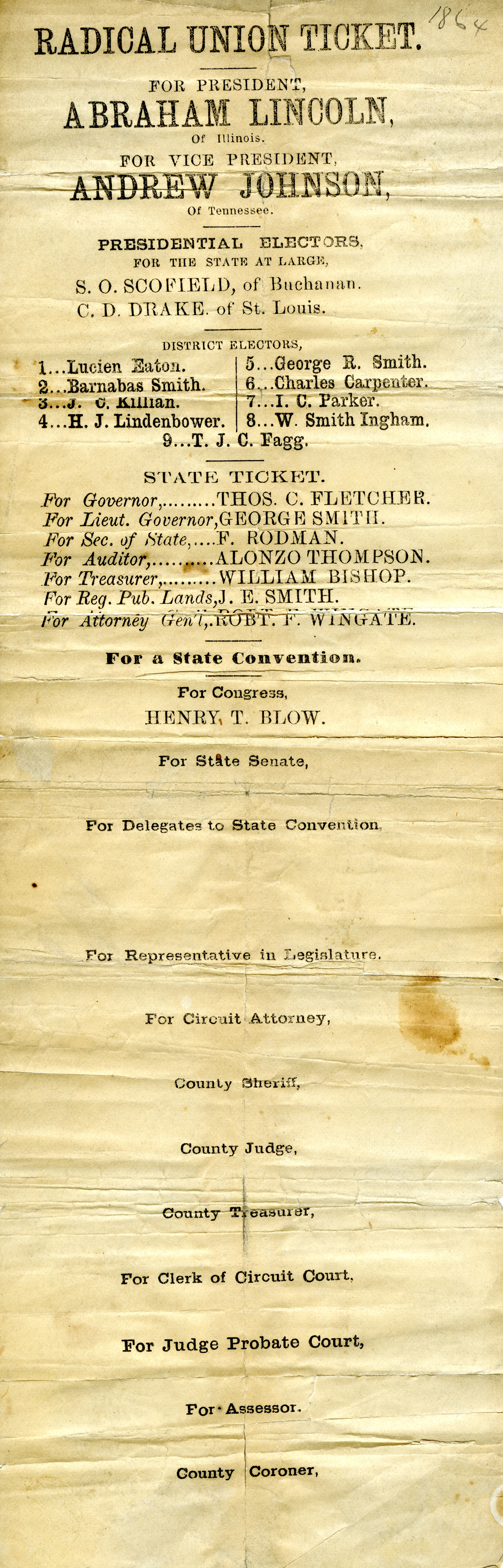
Missouri

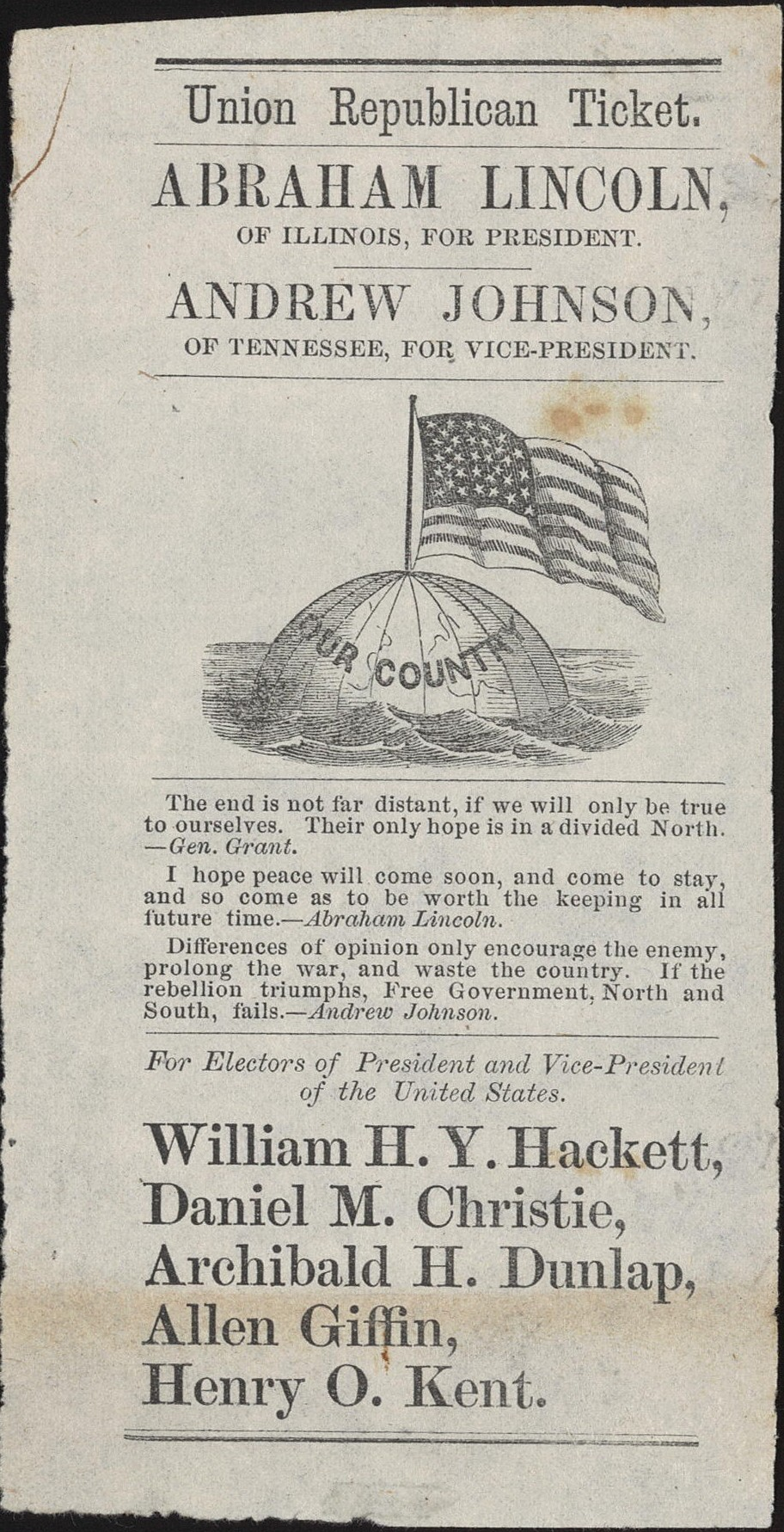
New Hampshire

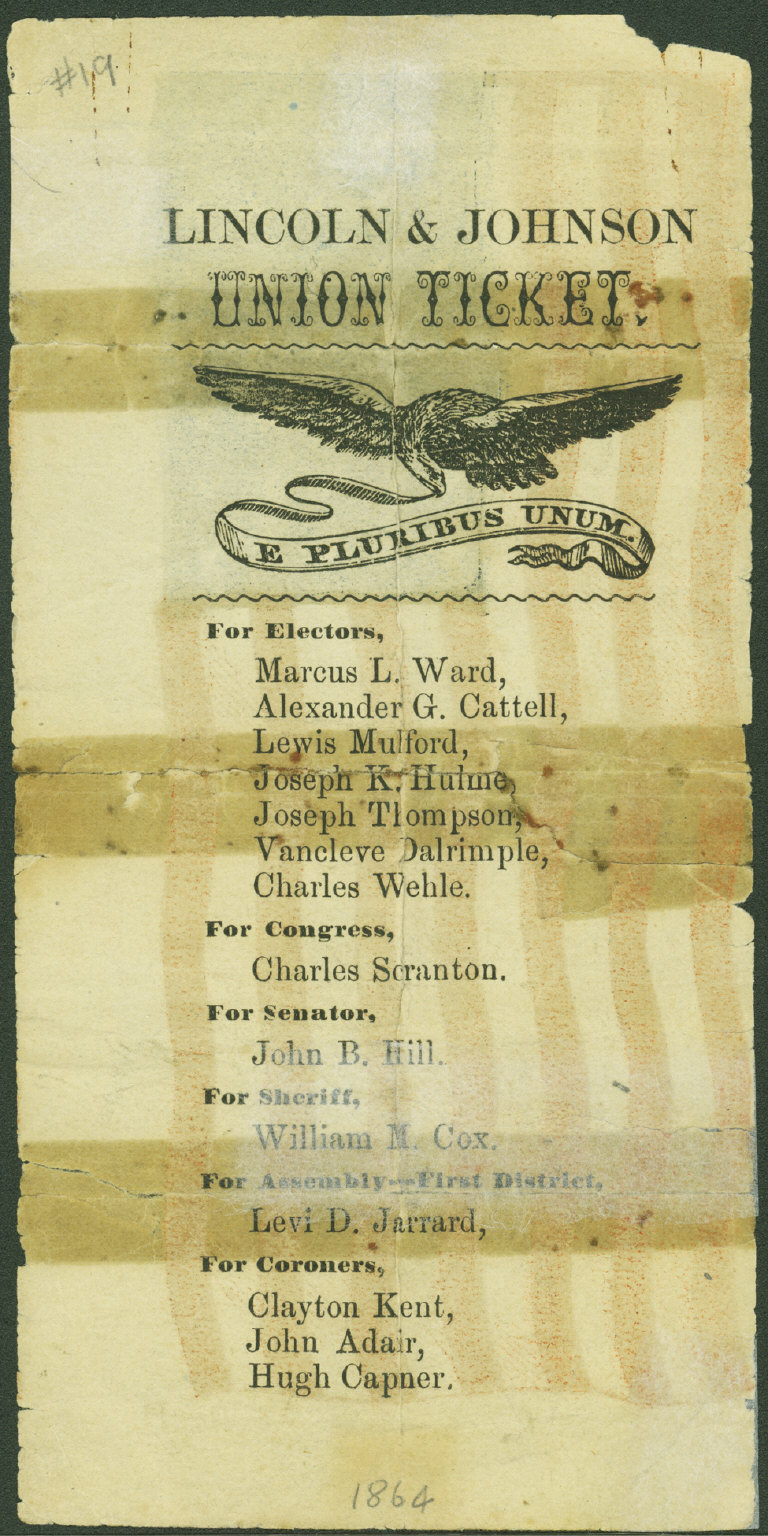
New Jersey

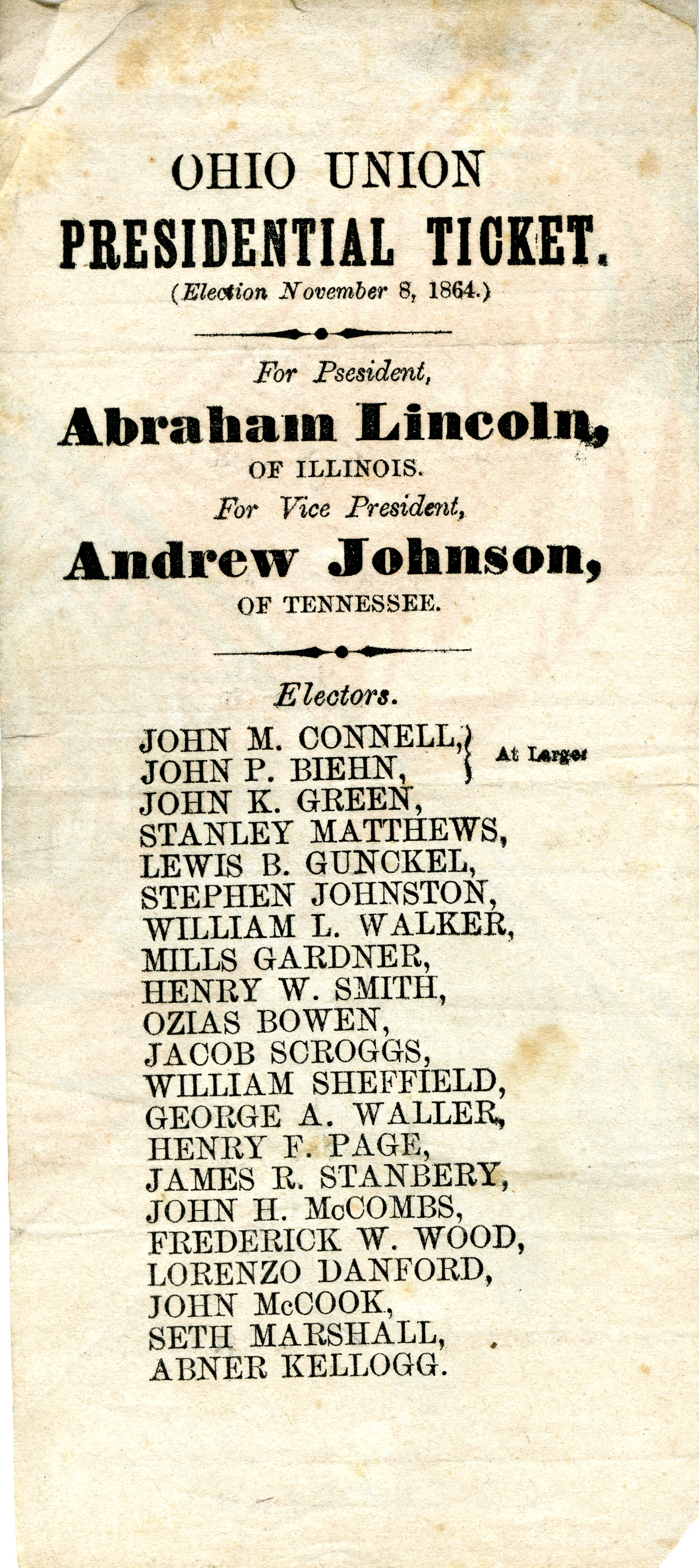
Ohio

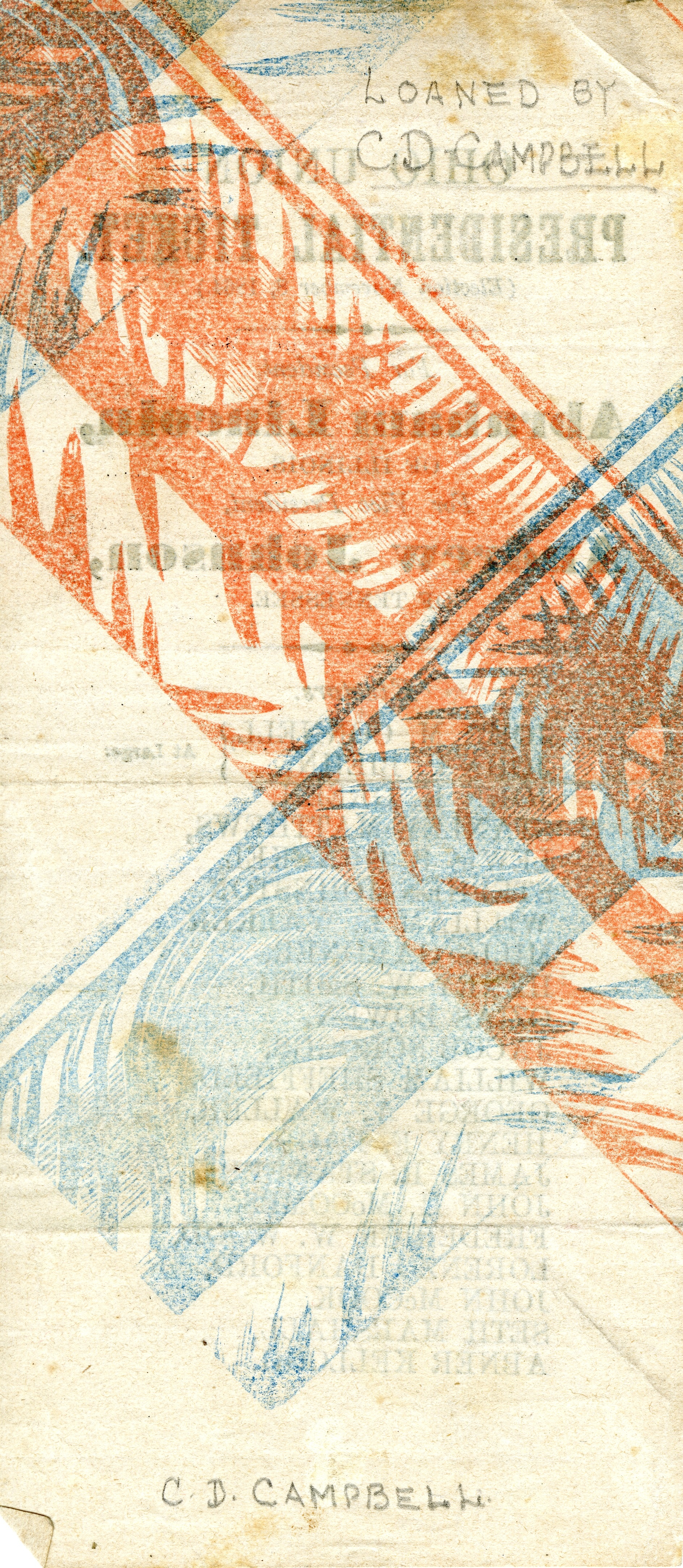
Ohio (obverse)

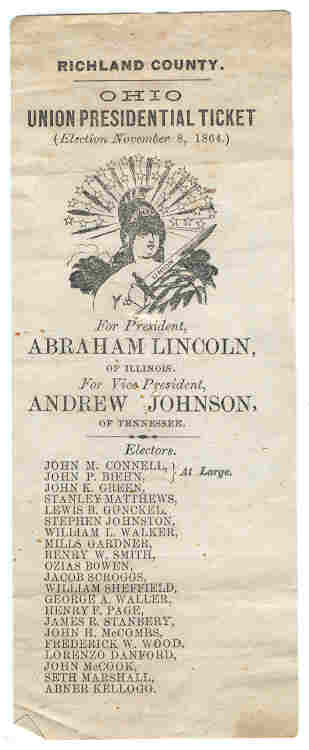
Ohio

=== Reconstruction, 1865–67 ===
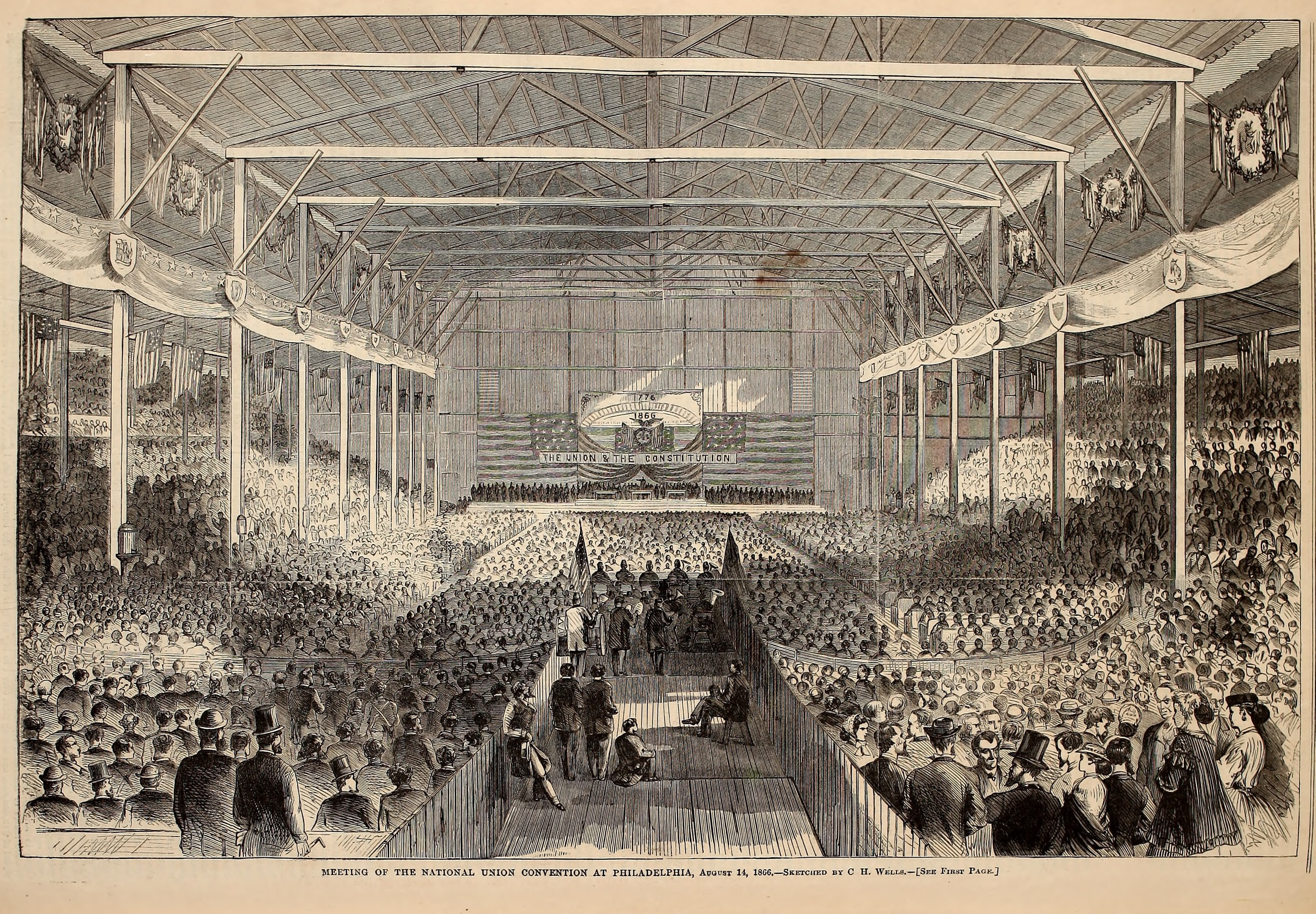
Meeting of the National Union Convention at Philadelphia, by C. H. Wells (1866)

Lincoln's assassination elevated Johnson to the presidency on April 15, 1865. Intent on seeking re-election, Johnson sought to preserve the Union Party as a vehicle for his political ambitions. He withheld his support from Democratic candidates in the 1865 United States elections, instead seeking Democratic support for a new conservative party. Johnson's advisors saw a coalition of Democrats, former Whigs, and conservative Republicans as a means to oppose Black suffrage, isolate their radical rivals, and restore the pre-war community of interest between Northern and Southern capitalists. Initially supported by much of the Northern public, Johnson's veto of the Civil Rights Act of 1866 alienated congressional Republicans, including once-friendly moderates and conservatives.

Johnson's supporters held the 1866 National Union Convention ahead of midterm elections that would determine control of the 40th United States Congress. Taking place in the aftermath of the New Orleans Massacre of 1866, the attempt to establish a national party quickly collapsed. Johnson's uncompromising opposition to the Fourteenth Amendment exhausted his goodwill with moderate Republicans, while his remaining allies lacked the influence needed to sustain a national organization. Many who supported the president's policies stayed away from the convention, and those who attended could not agree on whether it was a new political party or a pretext for pro-Johnson Republicans to support Democratic candidates. The delegates adopted a platform and appointed a national committee, but left without creating a new party. The abortive convention and Johnson's subsequent speaking tour discredited the president and strengthened conservative support for Black suffrage.

Pro-Johnson Unionists formed political parties in several states during 1866 and 1867, with varying results. Whigs led the formation of the Conservative Union Party in Tennessee and Missouri, where the Democratic Party was tainted by secession. The refusal of the Democratic convention to back Montgomery Blair's candidacy in Maryland's 5th congressional district ended Maryland's short-lived Conservative Party. Kentucky's Conservative Unionists briefly cooperated with Democrats during 1866, but were soon eclipsed by their coalition partners. In New York, a Conservative Union state convention attended mainly by Democrats nominated a Democratic gubernatorial candidate, with the result that prominent Conservatives, including party chairman Henry Jarvis Raymond, endorsed the Republican ticket. Pennsylvania Conservatives established a central committee but neglected to nominate candidates for the 1866 elections, leaving the Democrats as the only pro-Johnson party in the state.

The midterm elections were a disaster for Johnson and marked the end of the wartime Republican–Union coalition. The National Union Convention failed to unite conservatives and Democrats in a new political party. Instead, Johnson's demand that patronage appointees support the Philadelphia platform prompted moderates and conservatives to abandon the Union Party in droves. After 1867, Republicans and Unconditional Unionists coalesced in the Republican Party, while Conservative Unionists in the border states went over to the Democrats.

=== Aftermath, 1868–77 ===
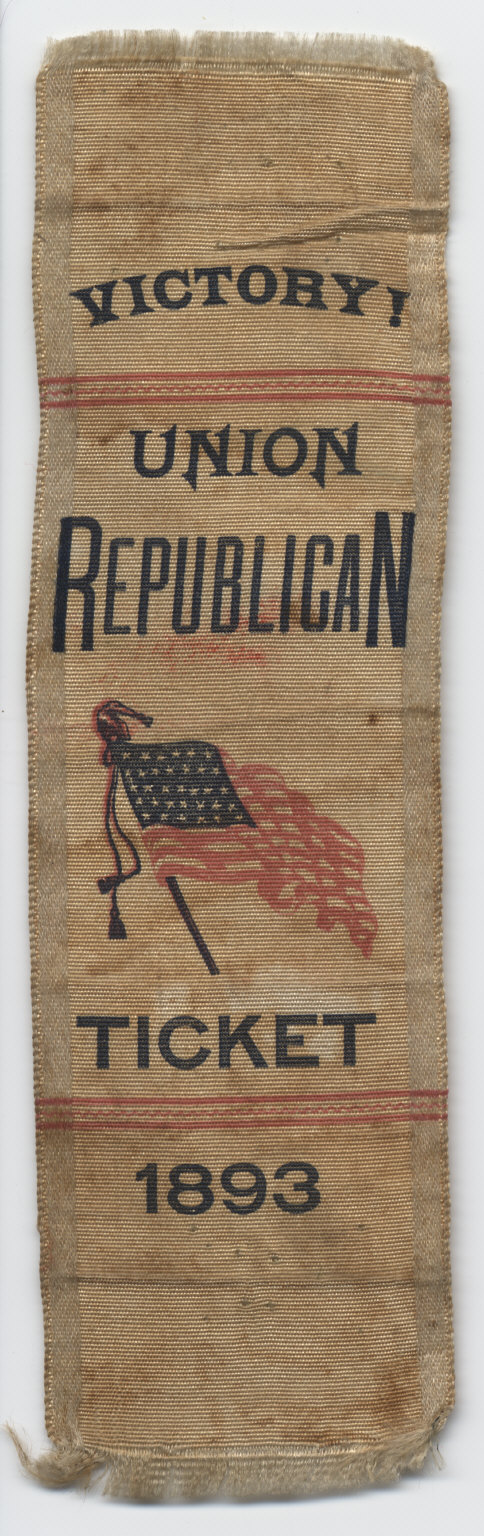
A Republican Party campaign ribbon in 1893 still used the Union Republican label.

Johnson was not nominated for re-election. The Republicans nominated Grant at their convention in Chicago days after Johnson was narrowly acquitted by the Senate in the first presidential impeachment trial; the meeting called itself the "National Union Republican Convention." (Note: The call for the convention was issued in the name of the "Union Republican party" and the rules adopted by the convention referred to the "National Union Executive Committee." During the proceedings on the first day, Charles C. Van Zandt moved to strike the word "Union" from the rules and formally readopt "Republican" as the name of the party. John A. Logan then moved to insert the word "Republican" after the word "Union," which was adopted.) The Democratic National Convention adopted a resolution thanking Johnson, but passed him over in favor of the former governor of New York, Horatio Seymour. Grant won the fall election on a platform emphasizing national reconciliation against the backdrop of a campaign marked by white supremacist paramilitary violence. Johnson persisted in hope that Seymour would withdraw in his favor as late as October, while Seward waited until the final days before the election to offer a tentative endorsement of Grant.

The Union label fell out of general use after 1867, but it retained some currency during the later years of Reconstruction. Missouri's Republican affiliate called itself the Radical Union Party as late as 1870, when the minority seceded to form the Liberal Republican Party. Published convention proceedings for 1872 and 1876 used the name of the Union Republican Party; the call for the 1880 Republican National Convention was the first since 1860 not to include the word "Union" in the party's official name.

Following the contentious 1876 United States presidential election, rumors circulated that the new Republican president Rutherford B. Hayes intended to revive the National Union Party. The U.S. secretary of the treasury John Sherman told Southern Republicans that Hayes aimed "to combine ... in harmonious political action the same class of men in the South as are Republicans in the North; that is, the producing classes, men who are interested in industry and property. We cannot hope for permanent success in New Orleans until we can secure conservative support among white men, property holders, who are opposed to repudiation and willing to give the colored people their rights." Hayes completed a tour of the Southern states in hopes of winning conservative Democratic support for the administration but never seriously considered abandoning the Republican Party. Persistent speculation forced Hayes to deny rumors of a partisan realignment. "The President very earnestly, and almost in these words, said that he had always been a Republican, is a Republican, and that the Republican party was never more necessary to the nation than it is to-day. 'That party ... is good enough for me, and by it I intend to stand.'"

== Electoral history ==
=== Presidential tickets ===
| Election | Ticket | | Electoral results | | | |
| Election | Presidential nominee | Running mate | Popular vote | Electoral votes | Change | Result |
|---|---|---|---|---|---|---|
| 1864 | Abraham Lincoln | Andrew Johnson | 55.02% | 212 / 234 | ▲32 | Won |

=== Congressional representation ===
| Congress | House of Representatives | | | | | Senate | | | |
| Congress | Election | Popular vote | Seats | Change | Percent | Election | Seats | Change | Percent |
|---|---|---|---|---|---|---|---|---|---|
| 38th | 1862–63 | 49.68% | 98 / 183 | ▼22 | 53.55 | 1862–63 | 35 / 50 | ▲4 | 62.00 |
| 39th | 1864–65 | 55.00% | 147 / 192 | ▲49 | 76.56 | 1864–65 | 41 / 52 | ▲6 | 76.92 |

== See also ==
- 1864 National Union National Convention
- 1866 National Union Convention
- History of the United States Republican Party

== Bibliography ==
=== Primary sources ===
- Clancy, M. A. (1876). Proceedings of the Republican National Convention [...]. Concord, NH.
- Davis, Eugene (1880). Proceedings of the Republican National Convention [...]. Chicago.
- Ely; Burnham; Bartlett (1868). Proceedings of the National Union Republican Convention [...]. Chicago.
- Murphy, D. F. (1864). Proceedings of the National Union Convention [...]. New York.
- Perrin, E. O. (1866). The Proceedings of the National Union Convention [...]. Washington, D.C.
- Smith, Francis H. (1872). Proceedings of the National Union Republican Convention [...]. Washington, D. C.
- United States (1866). The Statutes at Large, Treaties, and Proclamations of the United States of America. Boston.

=== Secondary sources ===
- Alexander, Thomas B. (1950). Political Reconstruction in Tennessee. New York: Russell and Russell.
- Astor, Aaron (2012). Rebels on the Border: Civil War, Emancipation, and the Reconstruction of Kentucky and Missouri. Baton Rouge: Louisiana State University Press.
- Baker, Jean H. (1973). The Politics of Continuity: Maryland Political Parties from 1858 to 1870. Baltimore: Johns Hopkins University. p. 62. ISBN 978-0-8018-1418-1.
- Blegen, Theodore C. (1975). Minnesota: A History of the State. Minneapolis: University of Minnesota Press. ISBN 978-0-8166-0754-9.
- Bradley, Erwin Stanley (1964). The Triumph of Militant Republicanism: A Study of Pennsylvania and Presidential Politics, 1860–1872. Philadelphia: University of Pennsylvania Press.
- Burnham, Walter Dean (1955). Presidential Ballots, 1836–1892. Baltimore: Johns Hopkins Press.
- Dell, Christopher (1975). Lincoln and the War Democrats: The Grand Erosion of Conservative Tradition. Rutherford, NJ: Farleigh Dickenson University Press.
- DeSantis, Vincent P. (1959). Republicans Face the Southern Question: The New Departure Years, 1877–1897. Baltimore: Johns Hopkins Press.
- Dubin, Michael J. (2002). United States Presidential Elections, 1788–1860: The Official Results by State and County. Jefferson, NC: McFarland & Co.
- Foner, Eric (1995). Free Soil, Free Labor, Free Men: The Ideology of the Republican Party Before the Civil War. New York: Oxford University Press.
- Foner, Eric (2014). Reconstruction: America's Unfinished Revolution, 1863–77 (Revised ed.). New York: HarperPerennial. ISBN 978-0-06-235451-8.
- Foner, Eric (2019). The Second Founding: How the Civil War and Reconstruction Remade the Constitution. New York: W. W. Norton and Company. ISBN 978-0-393-65258-1.
- Holt, Michael F. (1992). Political Parties and American Political Development: From the Age of Jackson to the Age of Lincoln. Baton Rouge: Louisiana State University Press. ISBN 978-0-8071-1728-6.
- Holt, Michael F. (1999). The Rise and Fall of the American Whig Party: Jacksonian Politics and the Onset of the Civil War. New York: Oxford University Press. ISBN 978-0-19-505544-3.
- Hood, James Larry (July 1978). "For the Union: Kentucky's Unconditional Unionist Congressmen and the Development of the Republican Party in Kentucky, 1863–1865". Register of the Kentucky Historical Society. 76 (3): 197–215. JSTOR 23378981.
- McKinney, Gordon (1978). Southern Mountain Republicans, 1865-1900: Politics and the Appalachian Community. Chapel Hill: University of North Carolina Press. ISBN 978-0-8078-1300-3.
- McPherson, James M. (1988). Battle Cry of Freedom: The Civil War Era. New York: Oxford University.
- Parrish, William E. (1973). A History of Missouri, Volume 3: 1860 to 1875. Columbia: University of Missouri Press. ISBN 978-0-8262-0108-9.
- Parrish, William E. (1963). Turbulent Partnership: Missouri and the Union, 1861–1865. Columbia, MO: University of Missouri Press. LCCN 63-8072.
- Ponce, Pearl T., ed. (2011). Kansas's War: The Civil War in Documents. Athens: Ohio University Press. ISBN 978-0-8214-4352-1.
- Smith, Adam I. P. (2006). No Party Now: Politics in the Civil War North. New York: Oxford University Press. ISBN 978-0-19-518865-3.
- Stebbins, Homer Adolph (1913). A Political History of the State of New York, 1865–1869. New York: Columbia University Press.
- Trefousse, Hans L. (1997). Andrew Johnson: A Biography. New York: W. W. Norton and Company.
- Thornbrough, Emma Lou (1989). Indiana in the Civil War Era, 1850-1880. Indianapolis: Indiana Historical Society. ISBN 978-0-87195-050-5.
- Webb, Ross A. (1969). "Kentucky: "Pariah Among the Elect"". In Curry, Richard Orr (ed.). Radicalism, Racism, and Party Realignment: The Border States during Reconstruction. Baltimore: Johns Hopkins Press. pp. 105–45.
