= David Tod =

25th Governor of Ohio

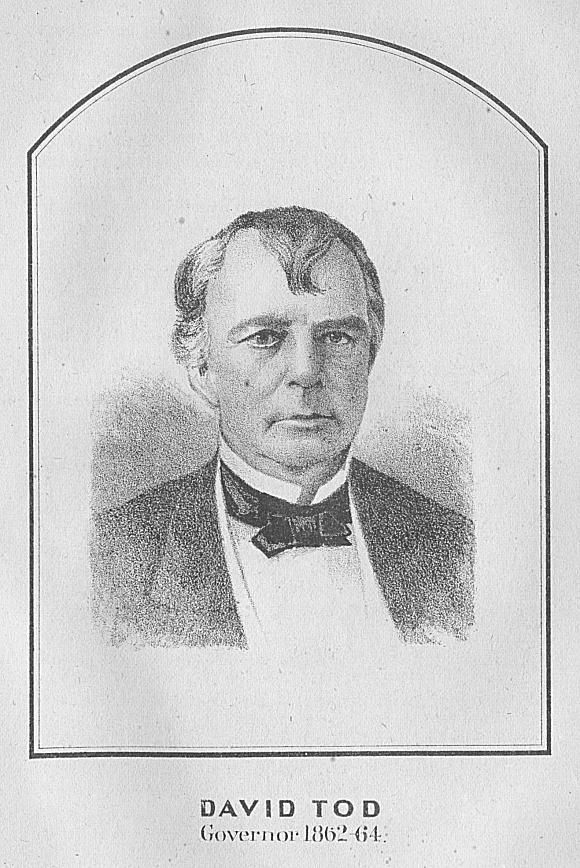

25th Governor of Ohio
- In office January 13, 1862 – January 11, 1864
- Lieutenant: Benjamin Stanton
- Preceded by: William Dennison
- Succeeded by: John Brough

United States Minister to Brazil
- In office August 28, 1847 – August 9, 1851
- President: James K. Polk; Zachary Taylor; Millard Fillmore
- Preceded by: Henry A. Wise
- Succeeded by: Robert C. Schenck

Personal details
- Born: February 21, 1805 Youngstown, Ohio, U.S.
- Died: November 13, 1868 (aged 63) Youngstown, Ohio, U.S.
- Party: Democratic (before 1861); Union (1861–1868)
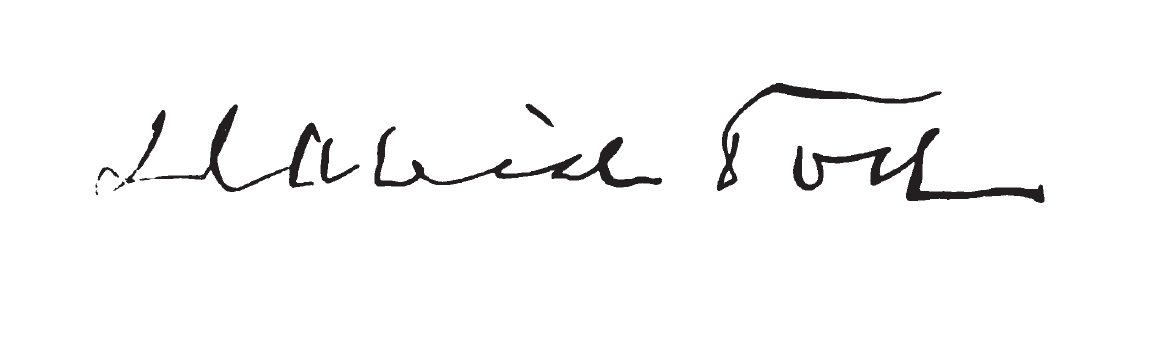
- Signature

David Tod (February 21, 1805 – November 13, 1868) was an American politician and industrialist from the U.S. state of Ohio. As the 25th governor of Ohio, Tod gained recognition for his forceful and energetic leadership during the American Civil War.

A Democrat who supported the war effort, Tod helped to maintain a fragile alliance between the state's Republicans and War Democrats and took steps to secure Ohio's borders. In 1863, the state's Union Party did not nominate Tod for a second term because of his tepid support for emancipation and his unpopularity among the state's myriad political factions.

After completing his two-year term as Ohio governor, Tod turned down an invitation to serve in the government of President Abraham Lincoln as Secretary of the Treasury, citing poor health. Tod died of a stroke in 1868, three years after the end of the war and was interred in Oak Hill Cemetery (Youngstown, Ohio).

A biography of David Tod by Joseph Lambert Jr. was published in 2023. The Political Transformation of David Tod is the title.

== Early life ==
Tod was born in Youngstown, Ohio, to a family actively involved in local and state politics. His father, George Tod, born to a Scottish immigrant in Suffield, Connecticut, had relocated to the Connecticut Western Reserve in 1800. There, George Tod pursued a career in public life, serving as an Ohio lawmaker between 1804 and 1806, and winning a seat as a justice of the Ohio Supreme Court in 1807.

David Tod attended Burton Academy in Geauga County and studied law in Warren, where he was appointed postmaster. Admitted to the Ohio bar in 1827, he accumulated considerable wealth as a lawyer actively involved in the coal and iron industries of the Mahoning Valley, and he went on to become president of the Cleveland and Mahoning Railroad.

== Early political career ==
Tod was in the Ohio State Senate from 1838 to 1840. He was a candidate for Ohio's governorship as a Democrat in 1844 and 1846, running on a strongly anti-national bank platform, but lost both elections. He was appointed by President James K. Polk as minister (ambassador) to Brazil from 1847 to 1851. He presided over the 1860 Democratic National Convention in Baltimore after the resignation of Caleb Cushing as convention president.

Tod belonged to the War Democrat faction of the Ohio Democratic Party that supported the Lincoln administration during the American Civil War. On September 5, 1861, a bipartisan coalition of Republicans and War Democrats met in Columbus, Ohio to form the Union Party. The party passed over the incumbent Republican governor, William Dennison, and threw its support behind Tod in the upcoming gubernatorial election—a move designed to win the support of War Democrats for the Union ticket.

Meanwhile, the Democrats who had not joined the Union Party nominated Hugh J. Jewett, who called for reconciliation with the South but "stopped short of taking a strong antiwar stance". Tod won the election, polling 206,997 votes to Jewett's 151,774. Although most Democrats supported Jewett, Tod's result represented a significant increase over the Republican vote in the previous election. Tod ultimately served one term as governor, leading the state from 1862 to 1864.

== Civil War governor ==
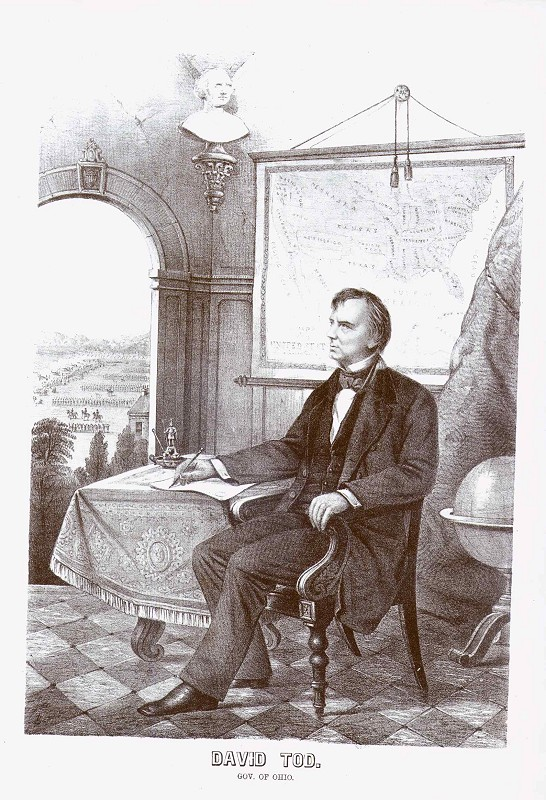
David Tod as governor of Ohio

Governor Tod faced significant difficulties in encouraging military recruitment and providing for Ohio troops in the field, but gained the nickname "the soldier's friend". As historian George W. Knepper observed, the governor was compelled, near the outset of his administration, to "deal with the highly emotional aftermath of the battle of Shiloh", a costly victory in which Ohio alone suffered 2,000 casualties. Several months later, when Confederate troops under the leadership of Stonewall Jackson threatened Washington, D.C., Tod was able to secure 5,000 volunteers to provide three months of service. He was less successful, however, in filling Ohio's federally mandated quota of 74,000 troops. In time, he advocated federal conscription, writing to Secretary of War Edwin Stanton, "With this Ohio will... respond to any further calls made upon her, but without it would be impossible to raise any considerable number". Among those Ohioans who participated in the war effort was Tod's nephew, Brigadier General James Hobart Ford, who served in the Trans-Mississippi Theater of the War.

States could use their own tax money to supplement the work of the United States Sanitary Commission as Ohio did. Under the energetic leadership of Governor Tod, Ohio acted vigorously. Following the unexpected carnage at the Battle of Shiloh in Tennessee in April 1862, it send 3 steamboats to the scene as floating hospitals loaded with doctors, nurses and medical supplies. The state fleet expanded to eleven hospital ships. The state also set up 12 local offices in main transportation nodes across the Midwest to assist Ohio soldiers moving back and forth.

Tod was challenged to maintain the state's security during the war, calling out the militia to respond to a cavalry raid by Confederate Brig. Gen. John Hunt Morgan from July 12 to 26, 1863, and arranging for the compensation of Ohioans whose property had been confiscated by Morgan's men. Damages inflicted upon Ohio residents reached $576,225, "while the expense of keeping the militia in the field raised the total cost to well over a million dollars". At the same time, as historian Richard H. Abbott observed, Tod also "battled with recalcitrant Democrats, unruly newspaper editors, draft rioters, and strange secret societies". He was compelled to call out troops to bring an end to draft riots in Holmes County, which became popularly known as the "Battle of Fort Fizzle".

He recommended the federal military arrest of Copperhead leaders such as Dr. Edson B. Olds—who sued him for kidnapping and actually had the governor briefly arrested, before the Supreme Court of Ohio issued a writ of habeas corpus–and Clement Vallandigham. In 1862, he attended the Loyal War Governors' Conference in Altoona, Pennsylvania, which ultimately backed Abraham Lincoln's Emancipation Proclamation and the Union war effort. At the same time, Tod resisted the idea of using black troops in the war effort. When black abolitionist leader John Mercer Langston urged the governor to enlist African-American soldiers to help the state fill its draft quotas, Tod responded sharply, saying, "Do you not know, Mr. Langston, that this is a white man's government; that white men are able to defend and protect it?" Nevertheless, by 1863, blacks were being enrolled in Ohio's volunteer units, and more than 5,000 served in state or federal units.

Governor Tod has aided me more and troubled me less than any other governor.

— Abraham Lincoln,

== Later years ==
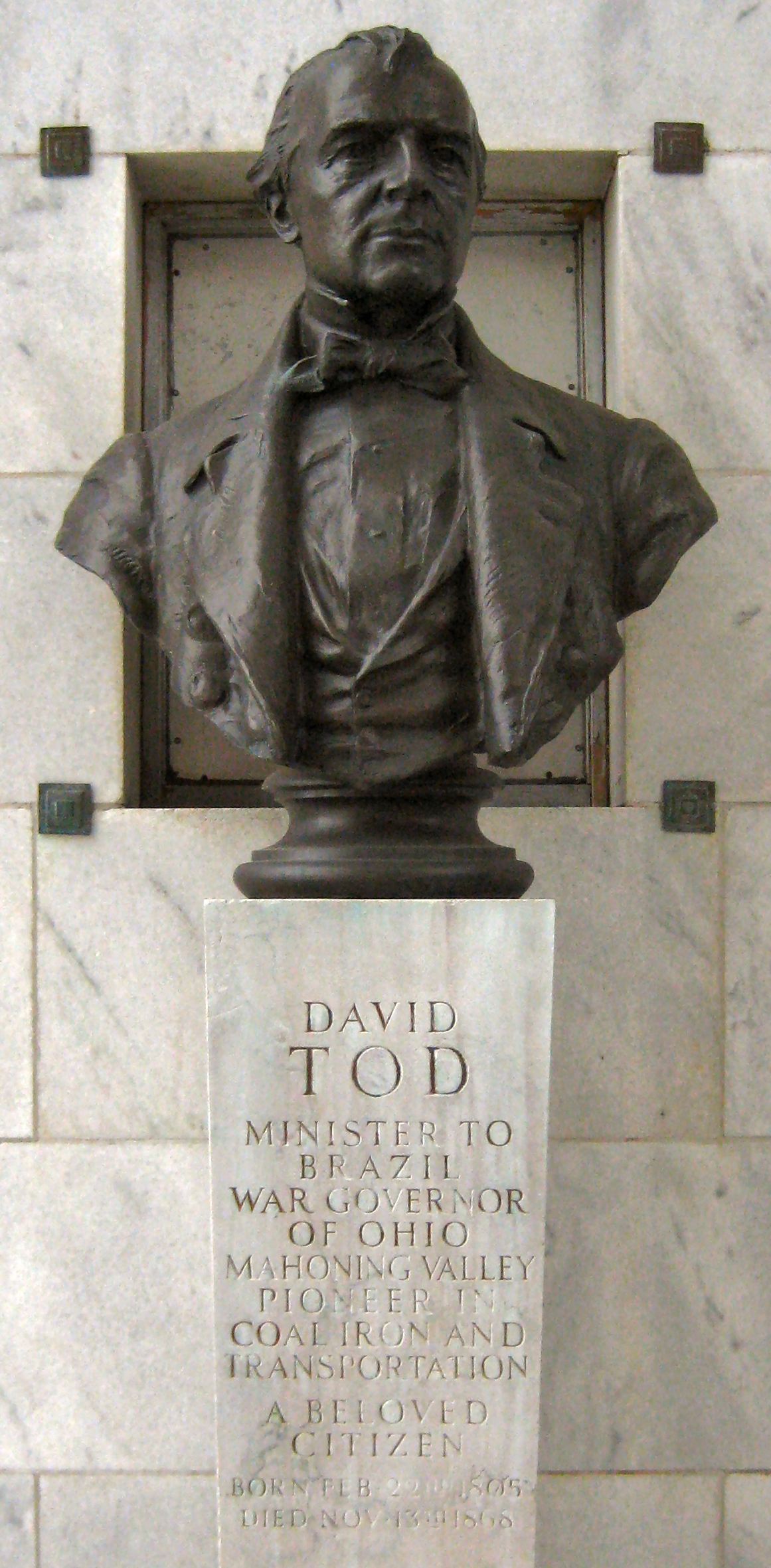
David Tod bust inside the National McKinley Birthplace Memorial

Tod was unable to secure renomination in 1863, losing it to another War Democrat, John Brough, who enjoyed greater popularity among Ohioans and more actively supported the anti-slavery direction the Northern war effort had by then taken. President Abraham Lincoln then offered Tod the post of U.S. Secretary of the Treasury, telling an aide, "He is my friend, with a big head full of brains... he made a good governor, and has made a fortune for himself". Tod, knowing he was not radical enough for Republicans in the United States Senate and in fragile health, declined the appointment. Tod died of a stroke in 1868, at the age of 63, leaving a widow and seven children. He was a Republican Presidential elector in 1868 for Grant/Colfax. He died before the meeting of electors, and was replaced by G. V. Dorsey.

Since his death, Tod has gained recognition as an effective political leader who guided his state through a difficult period. As Delmer J. Trester wrote: "His administration was characterized by intense patriotism, devotion to duty, administrative ability, and unflagging energy. Ohio was fortunate to have David Tod as one of its war governors".

Tod is honored with a full-size bronze depiction inside the Cuyahoga County Soldiers' and Sailors' Monument in Cleveland, Ohio for his service as governor during the Civil War.

Ohio Senate
Preceded by Leicester King	Member of the Ohio Senate from Trumbull County; 1838–1840	Succeeded by John Crowell
Party political offices
Preceded by Wilson Shannon	Democratic nominee for Governor of Ohio; 1844, 1846	Succeeded by John B. Weller
Preceded by Caleb Cushing	Permanent Chair of the Democratic National Convention; 1860	Succeeded by Horatio Seymour
Preceded by None	Union nominee for Governor of Ohio; 1861	Succeeded by John Brough
Diplomatic posts
Preceded by Henry A. Wise	United States Minister to Brazil; 1847–1851	Succeeded by Robert C. Schenck
Political offices
Preceded by William Dennison	Governor of Ohio; 1862–1864	Succeeded by John Brough
