= 1842 Ohio gubernatorial election =

- October 11, 1842
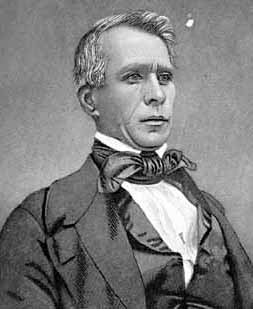

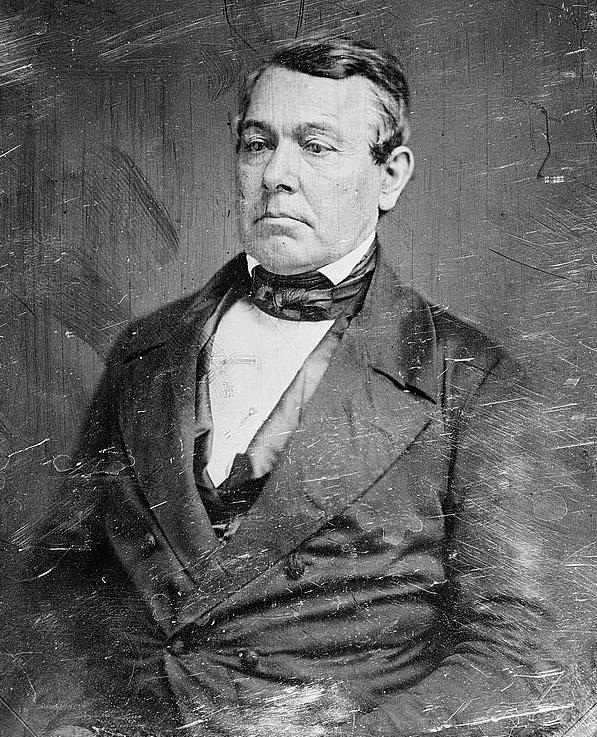
Nominee	Wilson Shannon	Thomas Corwin
Party	Democratic	Whig
Popular vote	119,774	117,902
Percentage	49.32%	48.55%
County results
Shannon
40–50%
50–60%
60–70%
70–80%
Corwin
40–50%
50–60%
60–70%
Governor before election
Thomas Corwin
Whig
Elected Governor
Wilson Shannon
Democratic

The 1842 Ohio gubernatorial election was held on October 11, 1842.

Incumbent Whig Governor Thomas Corwin was defeated by Democratic nominee and former Governor Wilson Shannon.

== General election ==
=== Candidates ===
- Thomas Corwin, incumbent governor (Whig)
- Leicester King, former state senator from Warren (Liberty)
- Wilson Shannon, former governor and Belmont County prosecutor (Democratic)

=== Results ===
1842 Ohio gubernatorial election
Party	Candidate	Votes	%	±%
Democratic	Wilson Shannon	119,774	49.32%	
Whig	Thomas Corwin (incumbent)	117,902	48.55%	
Liberty	Leicester King	5,134	2.11%	
Scattering		40	0.02%	
Majority		1,872	0.77%	
Turnout		242,850		
Democratic gain from Whig		Swing		
