= 1861 Ohio gubernatorial election =

- October 8, 1861
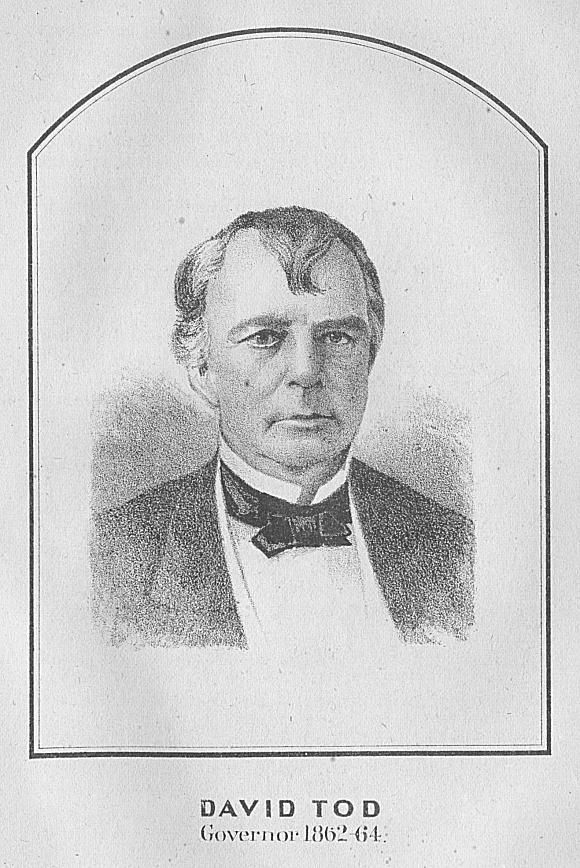

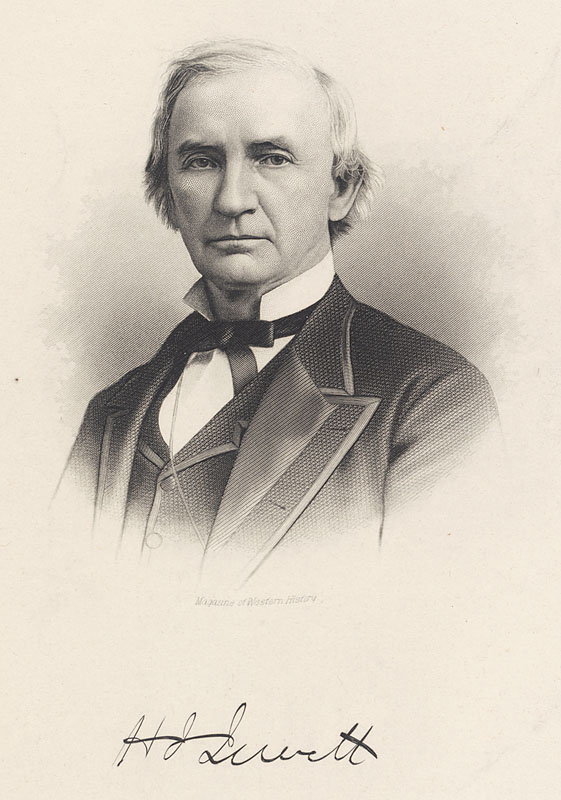
Nominee	David Tod	Hugh J. Jewett
Party	National Union	Democratic
Running mate	Benjamin Stanton	John S. Harrison
Popular vote	206,997	151,794
Percentage	57.68%	42.29%
- County results Tod: 50–60% 60–70% 70–80% 80–90% 90–100% Jewett: 50–60% 60–70% 70–80%
Governor before election
William Dennison Jr.
Republican
Elected Governor
David Tod
National Union

The 1861 Ohio gubernatorial election was held on October 8, 1861. National Union nominee David Tod defeated Democratic nominee Hugh J. Jewett with 57.68% of the vote.

== General election ==
=== Candidates ===
- David Tod, National Union
- Hugh J. Jewett, Democratic

=== Results ===
1861 Ohio gubernatorial election
Party	Candidate	Votes	%	±%
National Union	David Tod	206,997	57.68%	
Democratic	Hugh J. Jewett	151,794	42.29%	
Majority		55,203		
Turnout				
National Union gain from Republican		Swing		
