= Leicester King =

American politician

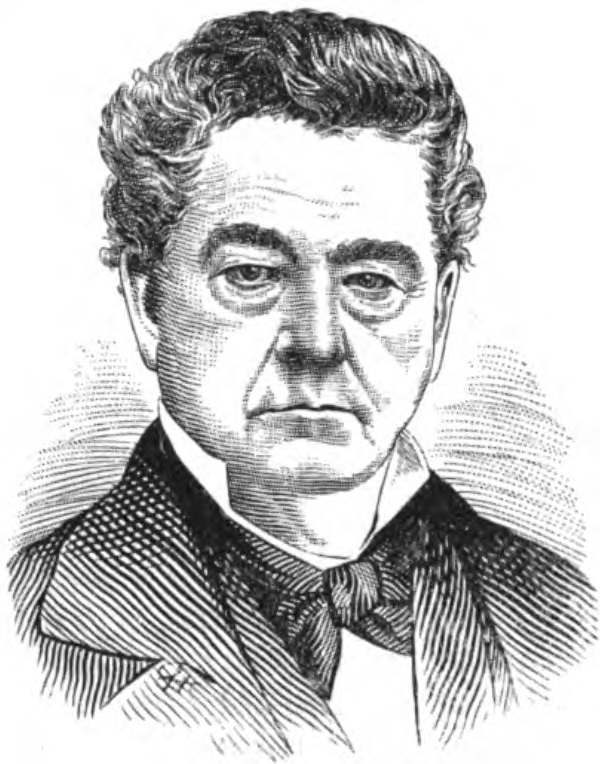

Member of the Ohio Senate from the Trumbull County district
- In office December 1, 1834 – December 2, 1838
- Preceded by: Ephraim Brown
- Succeeded by: David Tod

Personal details
- Born: May 1, 1789 Suffield, Connecticut, US
- Died: September 19, 1856 (aged 67) Bloomfield, Ohio, US
- Party: Whig; Liberty

Leicester King (born in Suffield, Connecticut, May 1, 1789 – September 19, 1856) was a 19th-century businessman, judge, and state senator in the Ohio General Assembly.

Married to Julia Ann Huntington, he moved to Warren, Ohio in 1817, where he worked as a mercantilist until 1833. After leaving the mercantile business, he devoted his time to the building of the Pennsylvania and Ohio Canal until being appointed associate judge of the Trumbull County Court of Common Pleas.

In 1835, King, a staunch abolitionist, was elected to the Ohio Senate, where he served two terms, until 1839. He was a member of the Whig Party before joining the Liberty Party in 1842. He was Liberty Party candidate for Ohio Governor in 1842 and 1844. King was nominated as Vice President on the Liberty Party ticket for the 1848 United States Presidential Election but declined the nomination.

King died September 19, 1856.
