= List of churches in the Diocese of Cleveland =

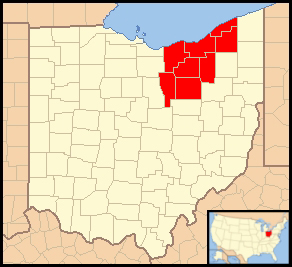
Diocese of Cleveland in red

This is a list of current and former Catholic churches in the Diocese of Cleveland in Ohio in the United States.

The diocese covers Ashland, Cuyahoga, Geauga, Lake, Lorain, Medina, Summit and Wayne Counties in northeastern Ohio. The cathedral church of the diocese is the Cathedral of St. John the Evangelist in Cleveland. The first parish in the diocese was St. Mary's on the Flats, founded in 1826.

== Cleveland ==
This is a list of active churches in the City of Cleveland in Ohio.

Name	Image	Location	Description/notes
Blessed Trinity		14040 Puritas Ave, Cleveland	
Cathedral of St. John the Evangelist		1007 Superior Ave. NW, Cleveland	Dedicated in 1852
Holy Name		8328 Broadway Ave. SE, Cleveland	Founded in 1854 for Irish immigrants
Holy Redeemer		15712 Kipling Ave, Cleveland	Founded in 1924 for Italian immigrants
Holy Rosary		12021 Mayfield Rd, Cleveland	Founded in 1892 for Italian immigrants, church dedicated in 1909.
Immaculate Conception		4129 Superior Ave, Cleveland	Founded in 1855, church dedicated in 1878
Immaculate Heart of Mary		6700 Lansing Ave, Cleveland	Founded as a schismatic parish in 1894 for Polish immigrants. Reconciled with the diocese in 1908, church dedicated in 1914
Mary Queen of Peace		4423 Pearl Rd, Cleveland	Founded in 2010 with the merger of Our Lady of Good Counsel and Corpus Christi Parishes
Our Lady of Angels		3644 Rocky River Dr, Cleveland	Founded in 1922, church dedicated in 1941
Our Lady of Lourdes		3395 E. 53rd St, Cleveland	Founded in 1883 to serve Czech and Slovak immigrants. Church dedicated in 1893
Our Lady of Mount Carmel		6928 Detroit Ave, Cleveland	Founded in 1906 for Italian immigrants
Our Lady of Peace		12601 Shaker Blvd, Cleveland	Founded in 1916, church dedicated in 1951
Sagrada Familia		7719 Detroit Ave, Cleveland	Founded and church dedicated in 1998
Shrine Church of St. Stanislaus		3649 E. 65th St, Cleveland	Founded in the 1880s for Polish immigrants, church dedicated in 1891. Was designated a parish shrine in 2004
St. Adalbert		2347 E. 83rd St, Cleveland	Founded in 1883 to serve Czech immigrants, church dedicated in 1912. Parish closed in 2010, reopened in 2012
St. Agnes - Our Lady of Fatima		6800 Lexington Ave, Cleveland	Founded in 1980 with the merger of St. Agnes and Our Lady Parishes. Church dedicated in 1983
St. Aloysius - St. Agatha		10932 St. Clair Ave, Cleveland	
St. Andrew Kim		2310 W. 14th St, Cleveland	Founded in 1978 for Korean immigrants. Purchased former Sacred Heart of Jesus Church in 1988
St. Augustine		2486 W. 14th St, Cleveland	Founded in 1860
St. Barbara		1505 Denison Ave, Cleveland	Founded in 1905 for Polish immigrants
St. Boniface		3545 W. 54th St, Cleveland	
St. Casimir		8223 Sowinski Ave, Cleveland	Founded in 1891 for Polish immigrants, church dedicated in the 1910s.
St. Colman		2027 W. 65th St, Cleveland	Founded in 1880 for Irish immigrants, church dedicated in 1918
St. Emeric		1860 W. 22nd St, Cleveland	Founded in 1904 for Hungarian immigrants, church dedicated in 1925
St. Ignatius of Antioch		10205 Lorain Ave, Cleveland	Founded in 1902, church dedicated in the 1920s
St. Jerome		15000 Lake Shore Blvd, Cleveland	Founded in 1919, church dedicated in 1920
St. John Cantius		906 College Ave, Cleveland	Founded in 1898 for Polish immigrants, church dedicated in 1926
St. John Nepomucene		3785 Independence Rd, Cleveland	Founded in 1902 for Czech immigrants
St. Leo the Great		4940 Broadview Rd, Cleveland	
St. Malachi		2459 Washington Ave, Cleveland	Founded in 1865 for Irish immigrants, church dedicated in 1947
St. Mark		15800 Montrose Ave, Cleveland	
St. Mary		15519 Holmes Ave, Cleveland	
St. Mel		14436 Triskett Rd, Cleveland	Founded in 1945
St. Michael the Archangel		3114 Scranton Rd, Cleveland	Founded as a mission in 1881 for German immigrants. Church dedicated in 1892
St. Patrick		3602 Bridge Ave, Cleveland	Founded in 1853 for Irish immigrants, church consecrated in 1931
St. Patrick		4427 Rocky River Dr, Cleveland	
St. Paul Croatian		1369 E. 40th St, Cleveland	
St. Peter		1533 E. 17th St, Cleveland	Founded in 1853 for German immigrants, church dedicated in 1859. Church closed in 2010, reopened in 2012
St. Rocco		3205 Fulton Rd, Cleveland	Founded in 1922 for Italian immigrants, church dedicated in 1952
St. Stephen		1930 W. 54th St, Cleveland	Founded in 1869 for German immigrants, church dedicated in 1881
St. Vincent de Paul		13400 Lorain Avenue, Cleveland	Founded in 1922
St. Vitus		6019 Lausche Ave, Cleveland	Founded in 1893 for Slovenian immigrants, the first such Catholic parish in Ohio. Church dedicated in the 1930s.
St. Wendelin		2281 Columbus Rd, Cleveland	Founded in 1903 for Slovak immigrants, church dedicated in 1925. Parish closed in 2010, reopened in 2012

== Akron ==
This is a list of active churches in the City of Akron in Ohio

Name	Image	Location	Description/notes
Blessed Trinity		300 E Tallmadge Rd, Akron	Founded in 2009 with the merger of St Martha, Christ the King and St. Hedwig Parishes
Immaculate Conception		2100 16th St. SW, Akron	Founded in 1923, church dedicated in 1953
Nativity of the Lord Jesus		2425 Myersville Rd, Akron	Founded in 1977, church dedicated in 1992
St. Anthony of Padua		83 Mosser Place, Akron	Founded in 1931 for Italian immigrants, church dedicated in 1940
St. Bernard		44 University Ave, Akron	Founded in late 19th century for German immigrants. church consecrated in 1905
St. Francis de Sales		4019 Manchester Rd, Akron	Founded in 1943
St. John the Baptist		1034 Brown St, Akron	Founded in 1907 for Slovak immigrants.
St. Mary		750 S Main St, Akron	
St. Matthew		2603 Benton Ave, Akron	Founded in 1943, church dedicated in 1946
St. Paul		433 Mission Dr, Akron	Founded in 1919, church dedicated in 2003
St. Sebastian		476 Mull Ave, Akron	Founded in 1928, church dedicated in 1960
St. Vincent de Paul		164 W Market St, Akron	Founded in 1837 for Irish immigrants, the first Catholic parish in Akron. Church dedicated in 1867
Visitation of Mary		Announciation Church, 87 Broad St, Akron	Founded in 1907, church dedicated in 1923. Became part of Visitation Parish in 2009
		John the Baptist Church, 1034 Brown St, Akron	Became part of Visitation Parish in 2009

== Cuyahoga County ==
This is a list of active churches outside of Cleveland in Cuyahoga County, Ohio.

Name	Image	Location	Description/notes
Communion of Saints		2175 Coventry Rd, Cleveland Heights	Formed in 2010 from St. Ann, St. Philomena, Christ the King and St. Louis Parishes
Gesu		2470 Miramar Blvd, University Heights	Founded in 1926, church dedicated in the 1950s
Holy Family		7367 York Rd, Parma	Founded in 1872 for German immigrants, church dedicated in 1952
Holy Spirit		4341 E.131st St, Garfield Heights	Founded in 2008 with the merger of St. Catherine of Alexandria, St. Timothy, and St. Henry Parishes
Mary Queen of the Apostles		6455 Engle Rd, Brook Park	Founded in 2009 with the merger of Assumption of Mary and St. Peter the Apostle Parishes
Our Lady of the Lake		19951 Lakeshore Blvd, Euclid	Formed in 2010 from Holy Cross and St. Christine Parishes.
Resurrection of Our Lord		32001 Cannon Rd, Solon	Founded in 1971, church dedicated in 2004
Sacred Heart of Jesus		1545 S. Green Rd, South Euclid	Founded in 2010 with the merger of St. Margaret Mary and St. Gregory the Great Parishes
Ss. Peter and Paul		4750 Turney Rd, Garfield Heights	Founded in 1902 for Ukrainian immigrants, church dedicated in 1910
Ss. Robert and William		367 E. 260th St, Euclid	
St. Albert the Great		6667 Wallings Rd, North Royalton	Founded in 1959, church dedicated in 1964
St. Angela Merici		20830 Lorain Rd, Fairview Park	Founded in 1923, church dedicated in 1948
St. Anthony of Padua		6750 State Rd, Parma	Founded in 1959, church dedicated in 1986
St. Bartholomew		14865 Bagley Rd, Middleburg Heights	
St. Basil the Great		8700 Brecksville Rd, Brecksville	Founded in 1960, church dedicated in 1968
St. Bernadette		2256 Clague Rd, Westlake	Founded in 1950
St. Brendan		4242 Brendan Ln, North Olmstead	Founded in 1964, church dedicated in 1987
St. Bridget of Kiladare		5620 Hauserman Rd, Parma	Founded in 1956
St. Charles Borromeo		5891 Ridge Rd, Parma	Founded in 1923, church dedicated in 1954
St. Christopher		20141 Detroit Rd, Rocky River	Founded in 1922, church dedicated in 1954
St. Clare		5659 Mayfield Rd, Lyndhurst	Founded in 1909, church dedicated in 1930
St. Clarence		North Olmsted	Founded in 1978
St. Clement		2022 Lincoln Ave, Lakewood	
St. Columbkille		6740 Broadview Rd, Parma	Founded in 1956, church dedicated in 1972
St. Dominic		3450 Norwood Rd, Shaker Heights	Founded in 1945, church dedicated in 1948
St. Francis de Sales		3434 George Ave, Parma	Founded in 1931
St. James	St. James Catholic Church, Lakewood Ohio	17514 Detroit Ave, Lakewood	Founded in 1908, church dedicated in 1935. Church closed in 2010, reopened in 2012
St. John Bosco		6480 Pearl Rd, Parma Heights	Founded in 1963, church dedicated in 1982
St. John Neumann		16271 Pearl Rd, Strongsville	Founded in 1977, church dedicated in 1982
St. John of the Cross		140 Richmond Rd, Euclid	Founded in 2009 with the merger of St. Paul and St. Felicitas Parishes
St. Ladislas		2345 Bassett Rd, Westlake	Founded in 1973
St. Luke the Evangelist		1212 Bunts Rd, Lakewood	Founded in 1922, church dedicated in 1923
St. Mary of the Falls		25615 Bagley Rd, Olmstead Falls	Founded in 1850, church dedicated in 1950
St. Mary		340 Union St, Bedford	Founded as a mission in 1905, became a parish in 1921. Church dedicated in 1970
St Mary		250 Kraft St, Berea	Founded in 1852, church dedicated in 1870
St. Matthias		1200 W Sprague Rd, Parma	
St. Monica		13623 Rockside Rd, Garfield Heights	Founded in 1952, church dedicated in 1990
St. Paschal Baylon		5384 Wilson Mills Rd, Highland Heights	Founded in 1953, church dedicated in 1971
St. Richard		26855 Lorain Rd, North Olmsted	Founded in 1950, church dedicated in 1951
St. Rita		32820 Baldwin Rd, Solon	Founded as a mission in 1925, became a parish in 1929
St. Therese		5276 E. 105th St, Garfield Heights	Founded in 1927, church dedicated in 1960
St. Thomas More		4170 N. Amber Dr, Brooklyn	Founded in 1946, church dedicated in 1967
Transfiguration		12608 Madison Ave, Lakewood	

== Lorain County ==
This is a list of active churches in Lorain County, Ohio.

Name	Image	Location	Description/notes
Holy Spirit		410 Lear Rd, Avon Lake	Founded in 1965
Holy Trinity		33601 Detroit Rd, Avon	Founded in 1841, church dedicated in 1902
Nativity of the Blessed Virgin Mary		418 W. 15th St, Lorain	Founded in 1898 for Polish immigrants, church dedicated in 1914
Our Lady Queen of Peace Parish		708 Erie St, Grafton	Church dedicated in 1871. Became part of Our Lady Queen of Peace in 2003
Sacred Heart		410 W Lorain St, Oberlin	Founded in 1880, church dedicated in 1967
Sacred Heart Chapel		4301 Pearl Ave, Lorain	Supervised by Sacred Heart Parish
St. Agnes		611 Lake Ave, Elyria	Founded in 1914
St. Anthony of Padua		1305 E Erie Ave, Lorain	Became diocesan parish in 2010
St. Frances Xavier Cabrini		2143 Homewood Dr, Lorain	Founded in 2010 with the merger of SS. Cyril & Methodius, St. John the Baptist and St. Vitus Parishes
St. Joseph		St. Joseph Church, 200 Saint Joseph Dr, Amherst	Founded in 1864. Now merged with Nativity BVM Parish
Nativity of the Blessed Virgin Mary		333 S. Lake St, South Amherst	Now merged with St. Joseph Parish
St. Joseph		32929 Lake Rd, Avon Lake	Founded in 1949
St. Jude		590 Poplar St, Elyria	Founded in 1943, church dedicated in 1951
St. Julie Billiart		5545 Opal St, North Ridgeville	Founded in 1978, church dedicated in 1981
St. Mary		309 W 7th St, Lorain	Founded in 1879 for Irish immigrants. Church dedicated in 1931
St. Mary		320 Middle Ave, Elyria	Founded in 1845
St. Mary of the Immaculate Conception		2640 Stoney Ridge Rd, Avon	Founded in the 1840s for German immigrants. Church dedicated in 1893
St. Patrick		512 N Main St,Wellington	Founded as mission in 1851 for Irish immigrants, became parish in 1878. Church dedicated in 1977
St. Peter		3655 Oberlin Ave, Lorain	Founded in 1909 for Italian immigrants, church dedicated in 1962
St. Peter		35777 Center Ridge Rd, North Ridgeville	Founded as a mission in 1875, became a parish in 1879. Church dedicated in 1923
St. Theresa of Avila		1878 Abbe Rd N, Sheffield	Founded in the 1840s, church dedicated in 1852
St. Thomas the Apostle		715 Harris Rd, Sheffield Lake	Founded as a mission in 1955, became a parish in 1962, church dedicated in 1972
St. Vincent de Paul		41295 N, Ridge Rd, Elyria	Founded in 1948, church dedicated in 1951

== Medina County ==
This is a list of active churches in Medina County, Ohio.

Name	Image	Location	Description/notes
Holy Martyrs		3100 Old Weymouth Rd, Medina	Founded in 1980
Sacred Heart of Jesus		260 Broad, St, Wadsworth	
St. Ambrose		929 Pearl Rd, Brunswick	Founded in 1957
St. Colette		330 W 130th St, Brunswick	Founded in 1977
St. Francis Xavier		606 E Washington St, Medina	Founded as mission for German immigrants in 1864, became parish in 1876. Church dedicated in 1962
St. Martin of Tours		1800 Station Rd, Valley City	Founded in the 1840s, church dedicated in 2002

== Summit County ==
This is a list of churches outside of Akron in Summit County, Ohio

Name	Image	Location	Description/notes
Holy Family		3179 Kent Rd, Stow	Founded in 1946, church dedicated in 1961
Immaculate Heart of Mary		1905 Portage Trail, Cuyahoga Falls	Founded in 1952, church dedicated in 1954
Our Lady of Guadalupe		9080 Shepard Rd, Macedonia	Founded in 1967, church dedicated in 1969
Mother of Sorrows		6034 S. Locust St, Peninsula	
Prince of Peace		1263 Shannon Ave, Barberton	Founded in 2002 with the merger of St. Mary and Sacred Heart Parishes
Ss. Cosmas and Damien		10419 Ravenna Rd, Twinsburg	Founded in 1862, church dedicated in 2002
St. Augustine		204 6th St NW, Barberton	
St. Barnabas		9451 Brandywine Rd, Northfield	Founded in 1956, church dedicated in 1957
St. Eugene		1821 Munroe Falls Ave, Cuyahoga Falls	
St. Hilary		2750 W. Market St, Fairlawn	Founded in the 1950s
St. Joseph		1761 2nd St, Cuyahoga Falls	Founded in 1831, church dedicated in 1913
St. Victor		3435 Everett Rd, Richfield	Founded in 1964, church dedicated in 1966
St. Mary		340 N. Main St, Hudson	Founded in the 1850s for Irish immigrants, church dedicated in 1995

== Lake County ==
Name	Image	Location	Description/notes
Divine Word		8100 Eagle Rd, Kirtland	
Immaculate Conception		2846 Hubbard Rd, Madison	
Immaculate Conception		37940 Euclid Ave, Willoughby	
Our Lady of Mount Carmel		1730 Mt. Carmel Dr, Wickliffe	
St. Anthony of Padua		316 Fifth St, Fairport Harbor	
St. Bede the Venerable		9114 Lake Shore Blvd, Mentor	
St. Cyprian		4223 Middle Ridge Rd, Perry	
St. Gabriel		9925 Johnnycake Ridge Rd, Concord Township	
St. John Vianney		7575 Bellflower Rd, Mentor	
St. Justin Martyr		35781 Stevens Blvd, Eastlake	
St. Mary		242 North State Street, Painesville	
St. Mary Magdalene		32114 Vine St, Willowick	
St. Mary of the Assumption		8560 Mentor Ave, Mentor	
St. Noel		35200 Chardon Rd, Willoughby Hills	

== Geauga County ==
Name	Image	Location	Description/notes
St. Anselm		12969 Chillicothe Rd, Chesterland	Founded in 1961, church dedicated in 1962
St. Edward		16150 Center St, Parkman	Founded as a mission in 1928, became a parish in 1929. Church dedicated in 1964
St. Helen		12060 Kinsman Rd, Newbury	
St. Lucy		16280 E. High St, Middlefield	
St. Mary		401 North St, Chardon	Founded in the early 20th century, church dedicated in 1999
St. Patrick		16550 Rock Creek Rd, Thompson	Founded in 1865, church dedicated in 1960

== Shrines ==
This is a listing of shrines that were formerly parishes in the diocese.

Name	Image	Location	Description/notes
St. Elizabeth of Hungary		9016 Buckeye Rd, Cleveland	Founded in 1892 as the first church for Hungarian immigrants in the United States. Church dedicated in 1922. No longer a parish
Conversion of St. Paul		1369 E. 40th St, Cleveland	Constructed as an Episcopal church in 1876, dedicated as a Catholic church in 1946, converted from a parish to a shrine in 2008

== Former churches ==
This is a list of former churches in the diocese.

Name	Image	Location	Description/notes
Annunciation		4697 W. 130th St, Cleveland	Became part of Blessed Trinity Parish in 2010, building sold in 2011.
Sacred Heart of Jesus		E. 71st St. and Kazimier St, Cleveland	Former church
St. Christine		840 E. 222nd St., Euclid	Formed in 1925. Closed in 2010
St. Joseph		2543 E. 23rd St, Cleveland	Founded in 1860s for German immigrants, church dedicated in 1873. Church closed in 1986, was demolished after fire in 1993
St. Ladislaus		2908 Wood Ave, Lorain	Founded in 1905 for Hungarian immigrants, church dedicated in 1910. Church closed in 2010
St. Martin of Tours		Liverpool	Constructed in 1850s. Parish later moved to Valley City.
St. Mary's on the Flats		Columbus & Girard Aves, Cleveland	Founded for Irish immigrants in 1826, it was the first Catholic parish in Cleveland. Church dedicated in 1840, closed in 1886, demolished in 1888
Transfiguration		Broadway and Fullerton Aves, Cleveland	Founded in 1943 for Polish immigrants. Church closed in 2010
