= 1948 Ohio gubernatorial election =

- November 2, 1948
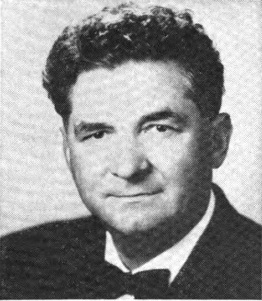

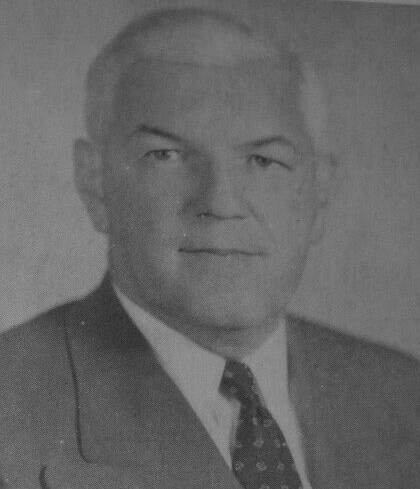
Nominee	Frank Lausche	Thomas J. Herbert
Party	Democratic	Republican
Popular vote	1,619,775	1,398,514
Percentage	53.67%	46.34%
- County results Lausche: 50–60% 60–70% Herbert: 50–60% 60–70%
Governor before election
Thomas J. Herbert
Republican
Elected Governor
Frank Lausche
Democratic

The 1948 Ohio gubernatorial election was held on November 2, 1948. Democratic nominee Frank Lausche defeated incumbent Republican Thomas J. Herbert in a rematch of the 1946 election with 53.67% of the vote.

== Primary elections ==
Primary elections were held on May 4, 1948.

=== Democratic primary ===
==== Candidates ====
- Frank Lausche, former Governor
- Ray T. Miller, former Mayor of Cleveland
- Robert S. Cox
- Joseph Torok Jr.

==== Results ====
Democratic primary results
Party	Candidate	Votes	%
Democratic	Frank Lausche	332,596	67.15
Democratic	Ray T. Miller	138,998	28.07
Democratic	Robert S. Cox	17,344	3.50
Democratic	Joseph Torok Jr.	6,337	1.28
Total votes		495,275	100.00

=== Republican primary ===
==== Candidates ====
- Thomas J. Herbert, incumbent Governor
- William L. White
- Albert Edward Payne

==== Results ====
Republican primary results
Party	Candidate	Votes	%
Republican	Thomas J. Herbert (incumbent)	575,054	87.10
Republican	William L. White	52,763	7.99
Republican	Albert Edward Payne	32,421	4.91
Total votes		660,238	100.00

== General election ==
=== Candidates ===
- Frank Lausche, Democratic
- Thomas J. Herbert, Republican

=== Results ===
1948 Ohio gubernatorial election
Party	Candidate	Votes	%	±%
Democratic	Frank Lausche	1,619,775	53.67%	
Republican	Thomas J. Herbert (incumbent)	1,398,514	46.34%	
Majority		221,261		
Turnout		3,018,289		
Democratic gain from Republican		Swing		
