= Governor Herbert =

Governor Herbert may refer to:

- Gary Herbert (born 1947), 17th Governor of Utah
- Henry Herbert, 10th Earl of Pembroke (1734–1794), Governor of Portsmouth
- John Herbert (Conservative politician) (1895–1943), Governor of Bengal from 1939 to 1943
- Thomas J. Herbert (1894–1974), 56th Governor of Ohio

== See also ==
- Robert Herbert (1831–1905), 1st Premier of Queensland
- Herbert H. Lehman (1878–1963), 45th Governor of New York
