= 1952 Ohio gubernatorial election =

- November 4, 1952
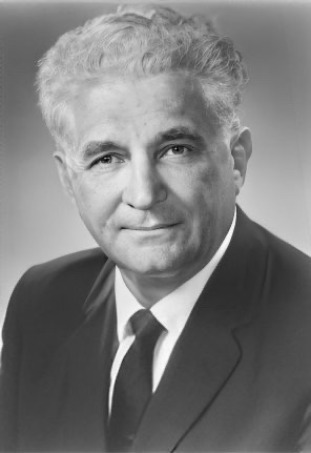

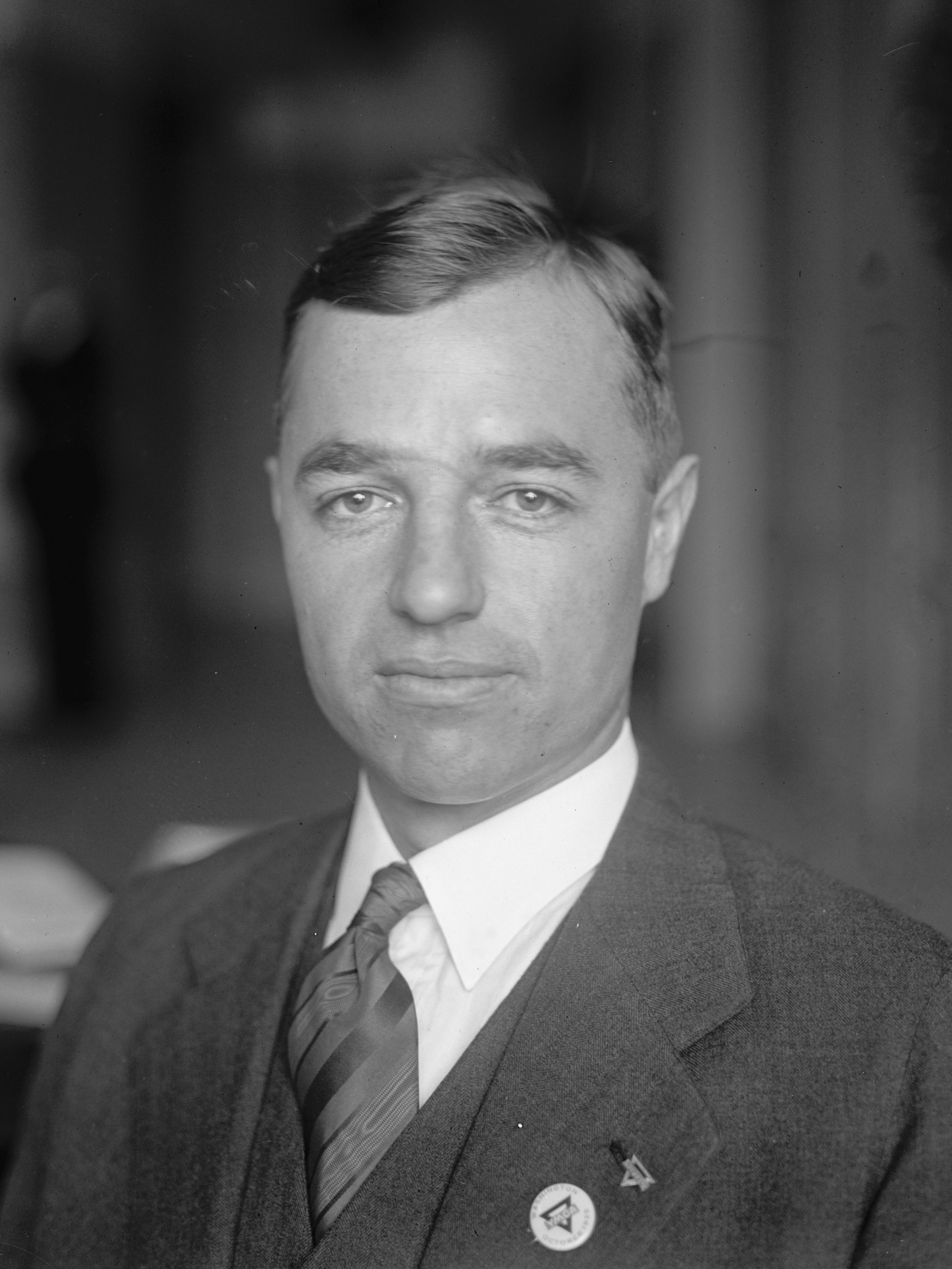
Nominee	Frank Lausche	Charles P. Taft II
Party	Democratic	Republican
Popular vote	2,015,110	1,590,058
Percentage	55.90%	44.11%
- County results Lausche: 50–60% 60–70% Taft: 50–60% 60–70%
Governor before election
Frank Lausche
Democratic
Elected Governor
Frank Lausche
Democratic

The 1952 Ohio gubernatorial election was held on November 4, 1952. Incumbent Democrat Frank Lausche defeated Republican nominee Charles Phelps Taft II with 55.90% of the vote.

== Primary elections ==
Primary elections were held on May 6, 1952.

=== Democratic primary ===
==== Candidates ====
- Frank Lausche, incumbent Governor

==== Results ====
Democratic primary results
Party	Candidate	Votes	%
Democratic	Frank Lausche (incumbent)	511,153	100.00
Total votes		511,153	100.00

=== Republican primary ===
==== Candidates ====
- Charles Phelps Taft II, Cincinnati City Councilman
- Thomas J. Herbert, former Governor
- Roscoe R. Walcutt, State Senator

==== Results ====
Republican primary results
Party	Candidate	Votes	%
Republican	Charles Phelps Taft II	413,431	47.47
Republican	Thomas J. Herbert	343,646	39.46
Republican	Roscoe R. Walcutt	113,898	13.08
Total votes		870,975	100.00

== General election ==
=== Candidates ===
- Frank Lausche, Democratic
- Charles Phelps Taft II, Republican

=== Results ===
1952 Ohio gubernatorial election
Party	Candidate	Votes	%	±%
Democratic	Frank Lausche (incumbent)	2,015,110	55.90%	
Republican	Charles Phelps Taft II	1,590,058	44.11%	
Majority		425,052		
Turnout		3,605,168		
Democratic hold		Swing		
