= Attorney General Duffy =

Attorney General Duffy may refer to:

- Herbert S. Duffy (1900–1956), Attorney General of Ohio
- John Gavan Duffy (1844–1917), Attorney-General of the Colony of Victoria
- Michael Duffy (Australian politician) (born 1938), Attorney-General of Australia
