= Cleveland Kurentovanje =

Slovenian-American festival

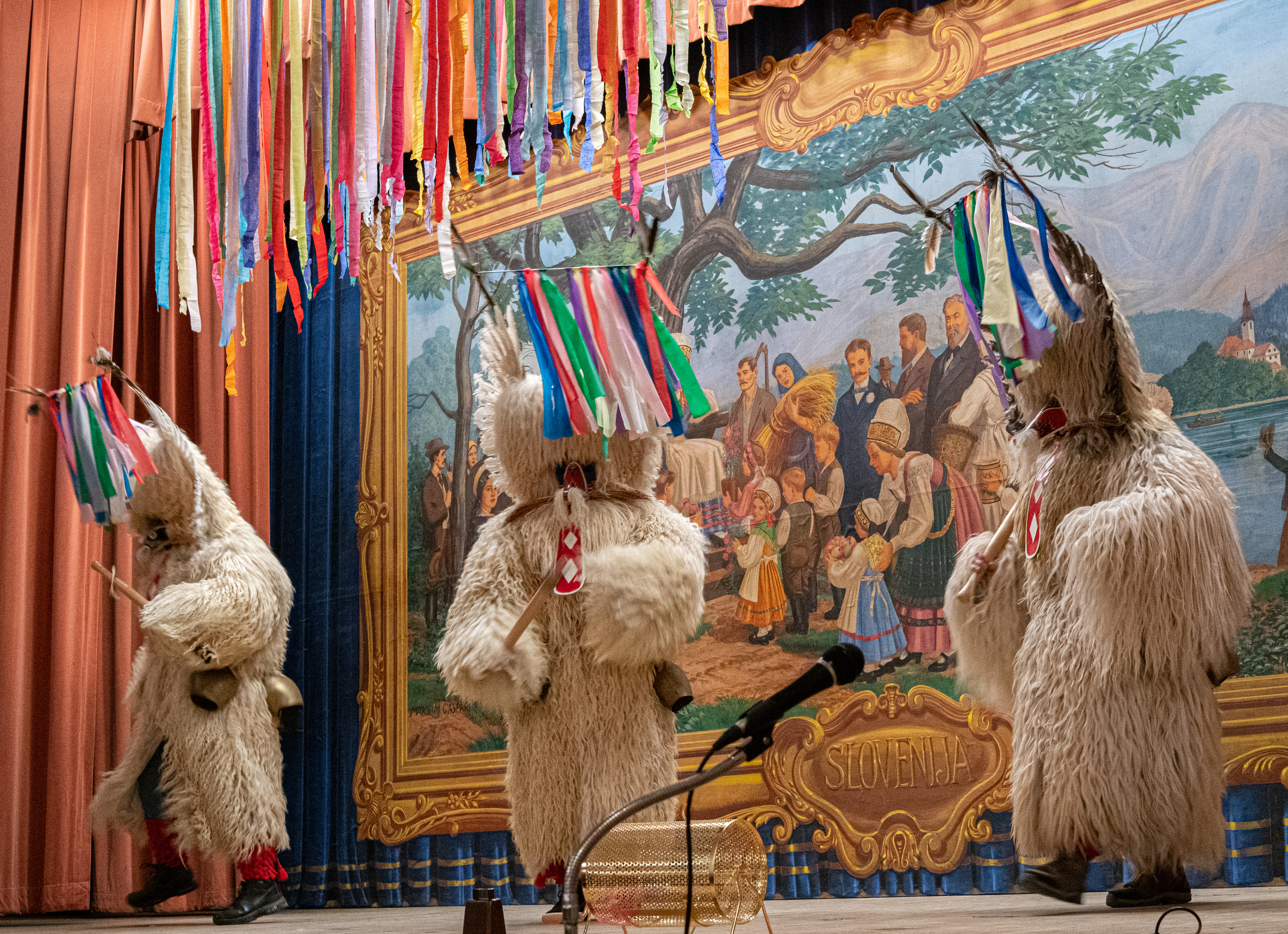
- Slovenian Kurentovanje kurenti in Cleveland at the Slovenian National Home.
- Status: active
- Genre: festivals
- Frequency: Annually
- Location: Cleveland
- Country: United States
- Years active: 12–13
- Inaugurated: 2013
- Website: www.clevelandkurentovanje.com

Cleveland Kurentovanje (pronounced koo-rehn-toh-VAHN-yeh) is a Slovenian-American festival celebrating the end of winter and the beginning of spring, taking place annually the weekend before Ash Wednesday, in Cleveland, Ohio, mirroring Kurentovanje in Slovenia.

The celebration is best known for its costumed Kurents (or Kurenti) — furry creatures with carnival masks, sheepskin hats, and cowbells. Folklore describes the beasts waking up from hibernation each year to send away winter’s chill. The city of Ptuj, where many Clevelanders have roots, is the center for the Kurentovanje festival in Slovenia.

== Festivities ==
The annual celebration is centered around the St. Clair–Superior neighborhood, which includes St. Vitus Church, Cleveland Slovenian National Home, and Slovenian Museum and Archives.

The celebration begins with the "Kurent Jump," when the Kurents emerge from hibernation alongside the bonfire, music, and dance. Spectators line the streets as the parade route begins at Saint Martin de Porres High School on East 62nd and Lausche Avenue, and proceeds down St. Clair Avenue, ending at the Slovenian National Home. Much of the festival itself is celebrated at the end of the parade route.

Common foods include kremšnite, Slovenian smoked sausage, sauerkraut and pierogies. Common drinks include local beer made from Styrian and Slovenian hops, and slivovitz liquor.

== History ==
Greater Cleveland contains the most Slovene Americans in the United States. So much population exists, Downtown Cleveland is home to a consulate for Slovenia. The first Cleveland Kurentovanje parade and festival began in 2013.

Due to COVID-19, the 2021 celebration was held entirely online.
