= Hugh S. Jenkins =

American politician

35th Ohio Attorney General
- In office January 8, 1945 – January 10, 1949
- Governor: Frank J. Lausche; Thomas J. Herbert
- Preceded by: Thomas J. Herbert
- Succeeded by: Herbert S. Duffy

Personal details
- Born: March 9, 1903 New Cumberland, West Virginia, U.S.
- Died: June 18, 1976 (aged 73) Columbus, Ohio, U.S.
- Resting place: Union Cemetery; Columbus, Ohio
- Party: Republican
- Spouse: Wilma Jenkins

Hugh S. Jenkins (March 9, 1903 – June 18, 1976) was Ohio Attorney General from 1945 to 1949.

Jenkins was born March 9, 1903, in New Cumberland, West Virginia, to John T. and Vanessa (Miskelly) Jenkins. He was a Republican from Mahoning County. Before election as Attorney General, he was chairman of Ohio's Board of Tax Appeals and was administrator of the Ohio State Bureau of Unemployment Compensation.

Jenkins was elected as Attorney General in 1944 and 1946, but lost re-election in 1948.

Jenkins died in Columbus, Ohio, June 18, 1976, and is buried at Union Cemetery.

Party political offices
Preceded by Hugh S. Jenkins	Republican nominee for Attorney General of Ohio; 1944, 1946, 1948	Succeeded by C. William O'Neill
Legal offices
Preceded by Thomas J. Herbert	Ohio Attorney General; 1945-1949	Succeeded by Herbert S. Duffy
