= Edward J. Blythin =

American politician

Edward Blythin

46th Mayor of Cleveland
- In office January 3, 1941 – December 31, 1941
- Preceded by: Harold Hitz Burton
- Succeeded by: Frank J. Lausche

Personal details
- Born: October 10, 1884 Newmarket, Flintshire, Wales, United Kingdom
- Died: February 14, 1958 (aged 73) Cleveland, Ohio, U.S.
- Party: Republican
- Spouse: Jane Rankin (m. 1913)
- Children: 5
- Education: Cleveland School of Law (LLB)

Edward Blythin (October 10, 1884 – February 14, 1958) was an American politician and jurist of the Republican party who served as the 46th mayor of Cleveland, Ohio.

== Life and career ==
Blythin was born October 10, 1884, in the small village of Newmarket in Flintshire, Wales, United Kingdom. His father was a farmer. Relatively well-educated, he became a bookkeeper for a coal company in Wales.

In 1906, he emigrated, ending up in Cleveland, Ohio, where he landed another bookkeeping job, for a real estate agency, a job he held for 10 years. During this time, he attended Cleveland State University College of Law at night, earning his law degree in 1916.

Blythin then turned to the practice of law. In 1935, Blythin accepted appointment as an assistant to the Cleveland city law director. He became law director in 1940. In January 1941, when Harold H. Burton resigned as Cleveland mayor in order to take a seat in the United States Senate, Blythin, as law director, automatically succeeded Burton to the mayor's office. In November, however, Blythin failed to win election to the seat, losing to Democrat Frank Lausche.

In 1943, Blythin left private law practice to accept an executive position at Western Reserve University.

In 1949, Blythin was elected to a judgeship in the Cuyahoga County Court of Common Pleas, where he served until his death. During his tenure on the court, Blythin presided over the notorious 1954 murder trial of Sam Sheppard. His stewardship of the trial was later overturned by the United States Supreme Court, which termed the trial "a Roman Holiday." In 1964, years after Blythin’s death, network television personality and newspaper columnist Dorothy Kilgallen announced at the Overseas Press Club in New York that in a private conference just prior to the start of jury selection for Sheppard’s trial, Blythin had told her he believed Sheppard was guilty. According to statements made by Blythin’s friends and family members years after he died, this private conference never occurred and was Kilgallen’s retaliation for the judge admonishing her for allegedly having shown up late and disrupted the court proceedings. However, the appellate record contains affidavits signed by others, including court clerk Edward Murray, who claimed to have heard Judge Blythin make statements, before jury selection started, that were similar to the statement Kilgallen claimed to have heard.

== Personal life and death ==
Blythin married Jane Rankin on April 3, 1913, and they had five children, Robert, Arthur, Glen, Jane, and William.

Judge Blythin suffered a severe heart attack at his home in Parma Heights, Ohio, on February 12, 1958. He was admitted to Lutheran Hospital in Cleveland, where he suffered a second heart attack and died on February 14. He was buried in Lake View Cemetery in Cleveland.

Political offices
Preceded by Harold H. Burton	Mayor of Cleveland; 1941	Succeeded by Frank J. Lausche
