= Herbert S. Duffy =

American politician

33rd and 36th Ohio Attorney General
- In office January 11, 1937 – January 9, 1939
- Governor: Martin L. Davey
- Preceded by: John W. Bricker
- Succeeded by: Thomas J. Herbert
- In office January 10, 1949 – January 8, 1951
- Governor: Frank J. Lausche
- Preceded by: Hugh S. Jenkins
- Succeeded by: C. William O'Neill

Personal details
- Born: February 25, 1900 New Lexington, Ohio, US
- Died: February 29, 1956 (aged 56) Columbus, Ohio, US
- Resting place: New Lexington Cemetery
- Party: Democratic

Herbert Smith Duffy (February 25, 1900 – February 29, 1956) was Ohio Attorney General from 1937 to 1939 and from 1949 to 1951.

Duffy, a Democrat from Columbus, Ohio, settled a case against the Ohio Bell Telephone Company. The case was before the Public Utilities Commission of Ohio, the Ohio Supreme Court and the United States Supreme Court, and lasted fourteen years.

Duffy won elections for Ohio attorney general in 1936 and 1948. He made a landmark appointment in one of his assistant attorneys general in 1937: Helen Elsie Austin was the first black and the first woman to be appointed to this position. She later served as legal counsel with federal agencies during the Franklin D. Roosevelt administration, was a civil rights activist, and served with the USIA in Africa. Duffy also hired five other African Americans to his staff. In 1938 Ohio Governor Martin L. Davey tried to take credit for Austin's appointment, but Duffy asserted his own leadership.

Duffy lost his bid for the state AG in 1942 and 1950. His political path became more difficult: he lost a Democratic primary election for Ohio governor in 1940, general elections for the Ohio Supreme Court in 1944 and 1946, and a party primary for lieutenant governor in 1954.

Duffy wrote a biography of former President William Howard Taft, which was published in 1930. He was national commander of the American Legion at the Inter-Allied War Veterans' Congress in Brussels, Belgium in 1935.

He died at his home after a brief illness in 1956.

== Publications ==
- Duffy, Herbert S. (1930). William Howard Taft. ISBN 9781888213263.

Party political offices
| Preceded by George D. Nye | Democratic nominee for Attorney General of Ohio; 1942 | Succeeded by George A. Hurley |
| Preceded by Harry T. Marshall | Democratic nominee for Attorney General of Ohio; 1948, 1950 | Succeeded by Paul F. Ward |
Legal offices
| Preceded by John W. Bricker | Ohio Attorney General; 1937-1939 | Succeeded by Thomas J. Herbert |
| Preceded by Hugh S. Jenkins | Ohio Attorney General; 1949–1951 | Succeeded by C. William O'Neill |
