= 1950 Ohio gubernatorial election =

- November 7, 1950
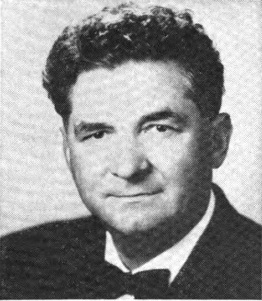

Nominee	Frank Lausche	Don H. Ebright
Party	Democratic	Republican
Popular vote	1,522,249	1,370,570
Percentage	52.62%	47.38%
- County results Lausche: 50–60% 60–70% Ebright: 50–60% 60–70%
Governor before election
Frank Lausche
Democratic
Elected Governor
Frank Lausche
Democratic

The 1950 Ohio gubernatorial election was held on November 7, 1950. Incumbent Democrat Frank Lausche defeated Republican nominee Don H. Ebright with 52.62% of the vote.

== Primary elections ==
Primary elections were held on May 2, 1950.

=== Democratic primary ===
==== Candidates ====
- Frank Lausche, incumbent Governor
- Clarence H. Knisley, former Ohio State Treasurer
- Joseph Torok Jr.

==== Results ====
Democratic primary results
Party	Candidate	Votes	%
Democratic	Frank Lausche (incumbent)	366,397	82.11
Democratic	Clarence H. Knisley	63,165	14.16
Democratic	Joseph Torok Jr.	16,651	3.73
Total votes		446,213	100.00

=== Republican primary ===
==== Candidates ====
- Don H. Ebright, Ohio State Treasurer
- Jim Rhodes, Mayor of Columbus
- Edward J. Hummel, former Ohio Secretary of State
- George V. Woodling

==== Results ====
Republican primary results
Party	Candidate	Votes	%
Republican	Don H. Ebright	338,390	62.65
Republican	Jim Rhodes	157,346	29.13
Republican	Edward J. Hummel	25,447	4.71
Republican	George V. Woodling	18,947	3.51
Total votes		540,130	100.00

== General election ==
=== Candidates ===
- Frank Lausche, Democratic
- Don H. Ebright, Republican

=== Results ===
1950 Ohio gubernatorial election
Party	Candidate	Votes	%	±%
Democratic	Frank Lausche (incumbent)	1,522,249	52.62%	
Republican	Don H. Ebright	1,370,570	47.38%	
Majority		221,261		
Turnout		2,892,819		
Democratic hold		Swing		
