= Charles Phelps Taft II =

American politician (1897–1983)

Charles P. Taft II
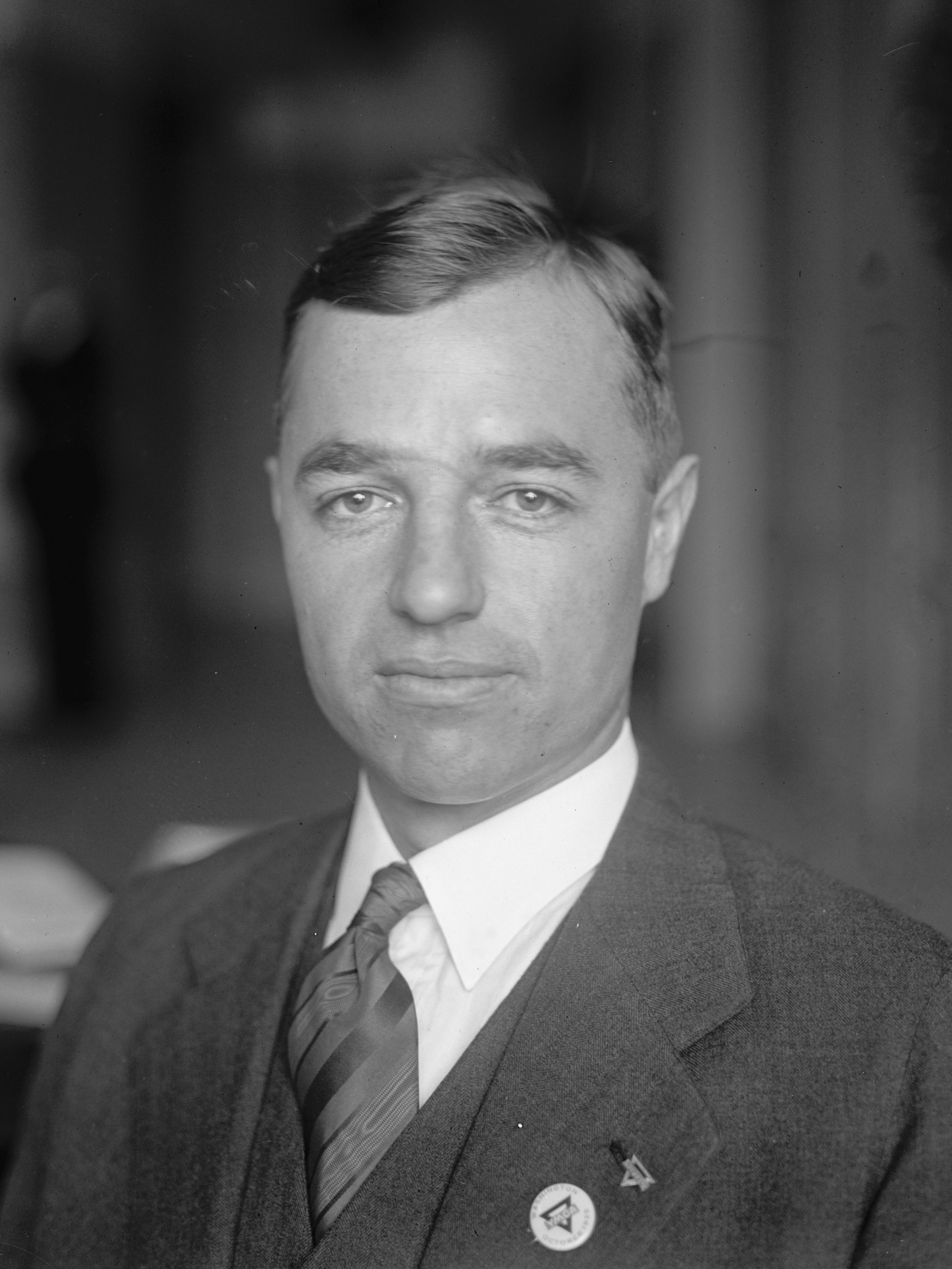
- Taft in 1925

Mayor of Cincinnati
- In office 1955–1957
- Preceded by: Carl W. Rich
- Succeeded by: Donald D. Clancy

Hamilton County Prosecuting Attorney
- In office 1926–1928
- Preceded by: Charles S. Bell
- Succeeded by: Nelson Schwab

Personal details
- Born: September 20, 1897 Cincinnati, Ohio, U.S.
- Died: June 24, 1983 (aged 85) Cincinnati, Ohio, U.S.
- Resting place: Spring Grove Cemetery; Cincinnati, Ohio, U.S.
- Party: Republican; Charter (municipal)
- Spouse: Eleanor Kellogg Chase (m. 1917)
- Children: 7, including Seth
- Parents: William Howard Taft; Helen Herron Taft
- Relatives: Taft family
- Education: Yale University; Yale Law School

Military service
- Allegiance: United States
- Branch/service: United States Army
- Years of service: 1918
- Battles/wars: World War I

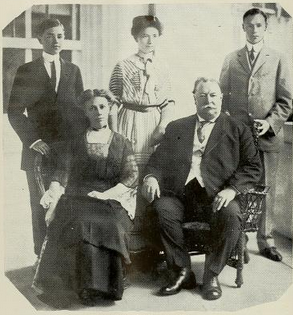
Charlie with his parents and siblings (1912)

Charles Phelps Taft II (September 20, 1897 – June 24, 1983) was an American politician who served as Mayor of Cincinnati, Ohio from 1955 to 1957. Like other members of his family, Taft was a Republican for the purposes of statewide elections. However, when running for municipal office in Cincinnati, Taft was a member of the Charter Party. During his term as mayor, Fortune magazine ranked Cincinnati as the best managed big city in the United States. As mayor, he gained the nickname "Mr. Cincinnati". He died in 1983 of a stroke at age 85.

== Early life ==
Charles Phelps Taft II was born in Cincinnati, Ohio, the youngest of three children born to President William Howard Taft and First Lady Helen Herron Taft. His siblings were U.S. Senator Robert A. Taft and Bryn Mawr College professor Helen Taft Manning. He was named after his uncle, U.S. Congressman Charles Phelps Taft. During his father's tenure as Secretary of War, he was a frequent playmate of President Theodore Roosevelt's children. Taft was only 11 years old when he moved to the White House, upon his father's election as President. On the morning of May 17, 1909, the same day his mother suffered a severe stroke, he underwent a "bloody adenoid operation". Taft dropped out of Yale University in order to serve in the United States Army during World War I and later returned to graduate in 1918, and then earned his law degree from Yale Law School in 1921. He was a member of Beta Theta Pi and a 1918 initiate into the Skull and Bones student society.

== Marriage ==
Taft married Eleanor Kellogg Chase on October 6, 1917, in Waterbury, Connecticut. His wife's father ran the Waterbury Clock Company. They had 7 children:

- Eleanor Kellogg Hall (Taft) (September 16, 1918 – June 28, 2004)
- Sylvia Howard Lotspeich (Taft) (August 7, 1920 – June 26, 2008)
- Seth Taft (December 31, 1922 – April 14, 2013)
- Lucia Chase Taft (June 6, 1924 – October 29, 1955)
- Cynthia Herron Taft Morris (April 28, 1928 – July 16, 2013)
- Rosalyn Rawson Taft (January 7, 1930 – September 4, 1941)
- Peter Rawson Taft III (1936).

Rosalyn died from polio and Lucia committed suicide.

== Career ==
Upon graduation from law school, Taft practiced law and became active in Cincinnati local politics. In 1925, he helped introduce the home-rule charter under which Cincinnati became the first major city in the United States to adopt the city manager form of government. Later that year, he became the youngest President of the International YMCA. In 1926, he and his brother Robert A. Taft helped form the Cincinnati law firm Taft Stettinius & Hollister. From 1927 to 1928, he served as Hamilton County Prosecutor. He served on the Cincinnati City Council three times, from 1938 to 1942, from 1948 to 1951, and from 1955 to 1977. During World War II, he served as Director of U.S. Community War Service at the Federal Security Agency and later as Director of Economic Affairs at the State Department, under President Franklin D. Roosevelt. From 1947 to 1948, he served as the first layman President of the Federal Council of the Churches of Christ in America. In the 1952 election, he ran unsuccessfully for Governor of Ohio, losing to incumbent Frank Lausche.

== Personal interests ==
Taft was a fan of the Cincinnati Reds baseball team and sometimes listened to games on the radio with an earplug during city council meetings. He was also a fisherman, who often had a canoe tied to his car in anticipation of his next fishing trip. When he died, the epitaph "Gone fishing" was inscribed on his grave at Spring Grove Cemetery in Cincinnati.

He served on the vestry (board of directors for an Episcopal parish) of Christ Church Cathedral in Cincinnati for decades. He served as a vestry member from 1928 to 1941, Junior Warden (vice president of the board) from 1942 to 1949, and Senior Warden (president of the board) from 1950 to 1977. The large sculpture on the southwest corner of the Christ Church Cathedral building is a commemoration of Taft and was created by the commissioned artist, Timothy S. Werrell (b. 1957). He was known to be a champion for the poor and worked to study why there were no African Americans attending the church in the 1950s. To this day, The Taft Lecture Series, funded by The Charles P. and Eleanor Taft Memorial Fund, "features provocative thinkers, writers, teachers, theologians, social justice activists, and leaders in the fields of religion, social science, the arts, politics, and more. Lectures are presented once or twice or year as the featured speakers’ schedules permit, and are always free to the public."

In his later years he spent much time preserving his father's childhood home, which became the William Howard Taft National Historic Site.

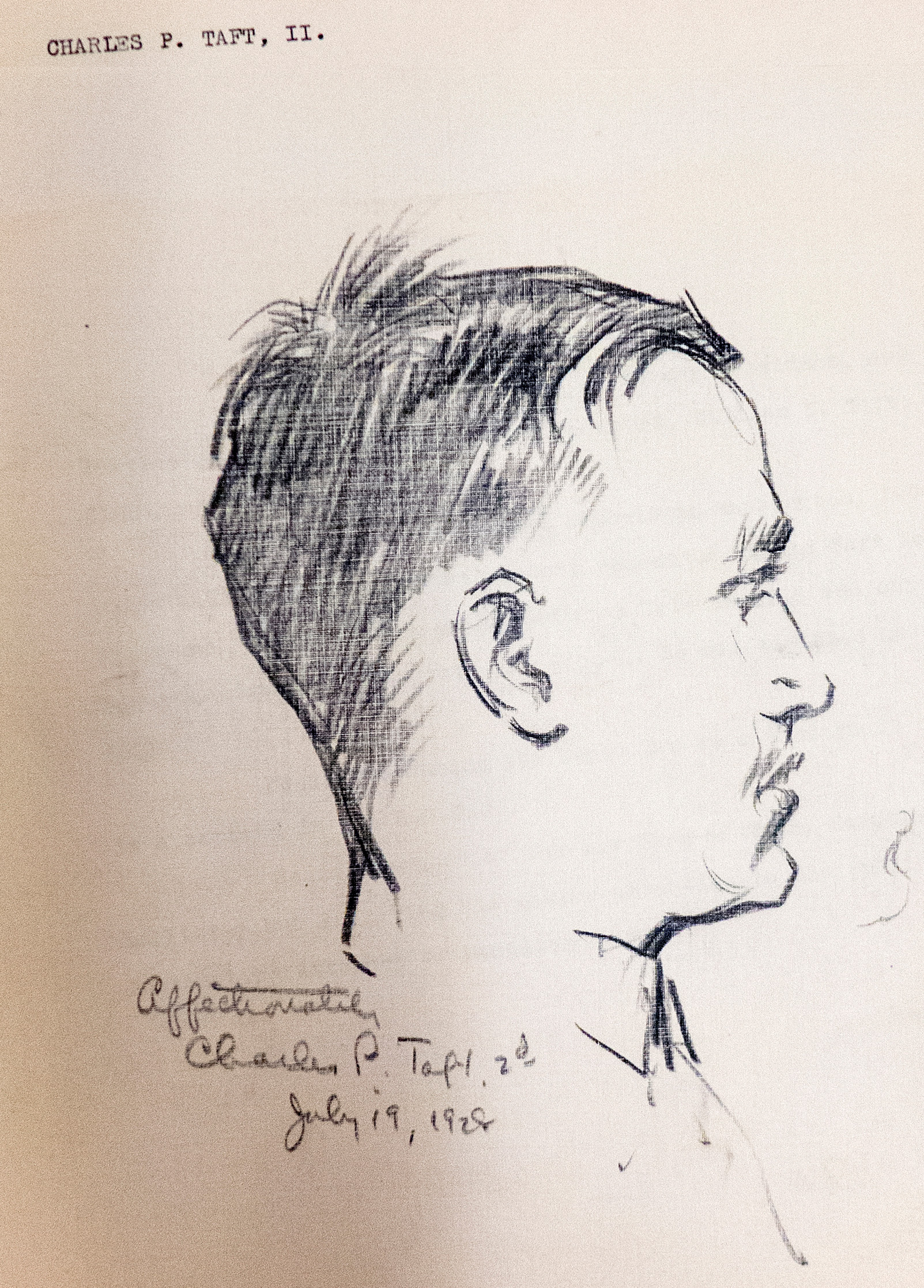
Charles P Taft by Manuel Rosenberg 1928

== Controversy ==
In 1952 (while he was Senior Warden at Christ Church), Taft was accused by Cincinnati Councilman Jesse D. Locker, the first Black council member in Cincinnati, of inserting restrictive race clauses into the deeds of properties he was developing. These clauses read, “These premises shall not be sold, leased or rented to, nor occupied by, except as a servant, anyone not of the Caucasian Race”. Though these types of clauses had been deemed illegal and unconstitutional by the U.S. Supreme Court in 1948, Taft defended himself by saying, “I built 265 good houses during the war at Woodside Homes and Shawanoe Trail and I am proud of them. I could only do that on borrowed money, and at that time I nor anyone else could borrow a dime from any financial institution I know, for any such purpose, without such clauses in the deeds”.

== Notes ==
Political offices
Preceded by Carl W. Rich	Mayor of Cincinnati, Ohio; 1955–1957	Succeeded by Donald D. Clancy
Party political offices
Preceded by Don H. Ebright	Republican Party nominee for Governor of Ohio; 1952	Succeeded by Jim Rhodes
