= 1954 Ohio gubernatorial election =

- November 2, 1954
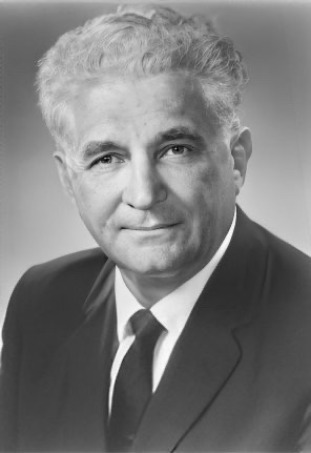

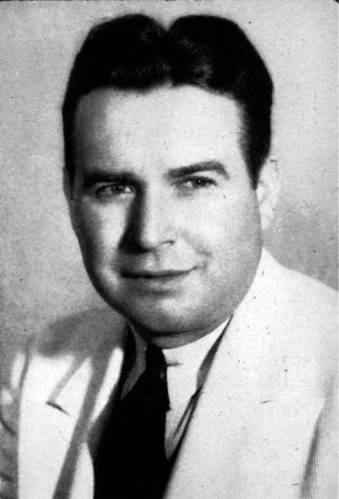
Nominee	Frank Lausche	Jim Rhodes
Party	Democratic	Republican
Popular vote	1,405,262	1,192,528
Percentage	54.10%	45.91%
- County results Lausche: 50–60% 60–70% Rhodes: 50–60% 60–70%
Governor before election
Frank Lausche
Democratic
Elected Governor
Frank Lausche
Democratic

The 1954 Ohio gubernatorial election was held on November 2, 1954. Incumbent Democrat Frank Lausche defeated Republican nominee Jim Rhodes with 54.10% of the vote. To date this is the last gubernatorial election where Van Wert County voted Democratic.

== Primary elections ==
Primary elections were held on May 4, 1954.

=== Democratic primary ===
==== Candidates ====
- Frank Lausche, incumbent Governor

==== Results ====
Democratic primary results
Party	Candidate	Votes	%
Democratic	Frank Lausche (incumbent)	338,799	100.00
Total votes		338,799	100.00

=== Republican primary ===
==== Candidates ====
- Jim Rhodes, Ohio State Auditor

==== Results ====
Republican primary results
Party	Candidate	Votes	%
Republican	Jim Rhodes	400,294	100.00
Total votes		400,294	100.00

== General election ==
=== Candidates ===
- Frank Lausche, Democratic
- Jim Rhodes, Republican

=== Results ===
1954 Ohio gubernatorial election
Party	Candidate	Votes	%	±%
Democratic	Frank Lausche (incumbent)	1,405,262	54.10%	
Republican	Jim Rhodes	1,192,528	45.91%	
Majority		212,734		
Turnout		2,597,790		
Democratic hold		Swing		
