= 1941 Cleveland mayoral election =

Cleveland mayoral election, 1941
- November 4, 1941
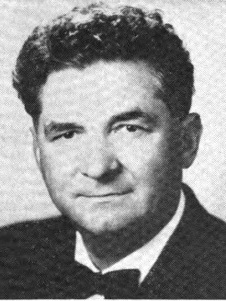

Nominee	Frank Lausche	Edward J. Blythin
Party	Democratic	Republican
Popular vote	145,324	94,534
Percentage	60.59%	39.41%
Mayor before election
Edward J. Blythin
Republican
Elected mayor
Frank Lausche
Democratic

The Cleveland mayoral election of 1941 saw the election of Frank Lausche, who defeated incumbent mayor Edward J. Blythin, who had assumed the office when Harold Hitz Burton resigned as mayor to take a seat in the United States Senate.

== General election ==
1941 Cleveland mayoral election (general election)
Party	Candidate	Votes	%
Democratic	Frank Lausche	145,324	60.59%
Republican	Edward J. Blythin (incumbent)	94,534	39.41%
Turnout		239,858	
