= St. Mary's Roman Catholic Church (Elyria, Ohio) =

Historic church in Ohio, United States

- U.S. National Register of Historic Places
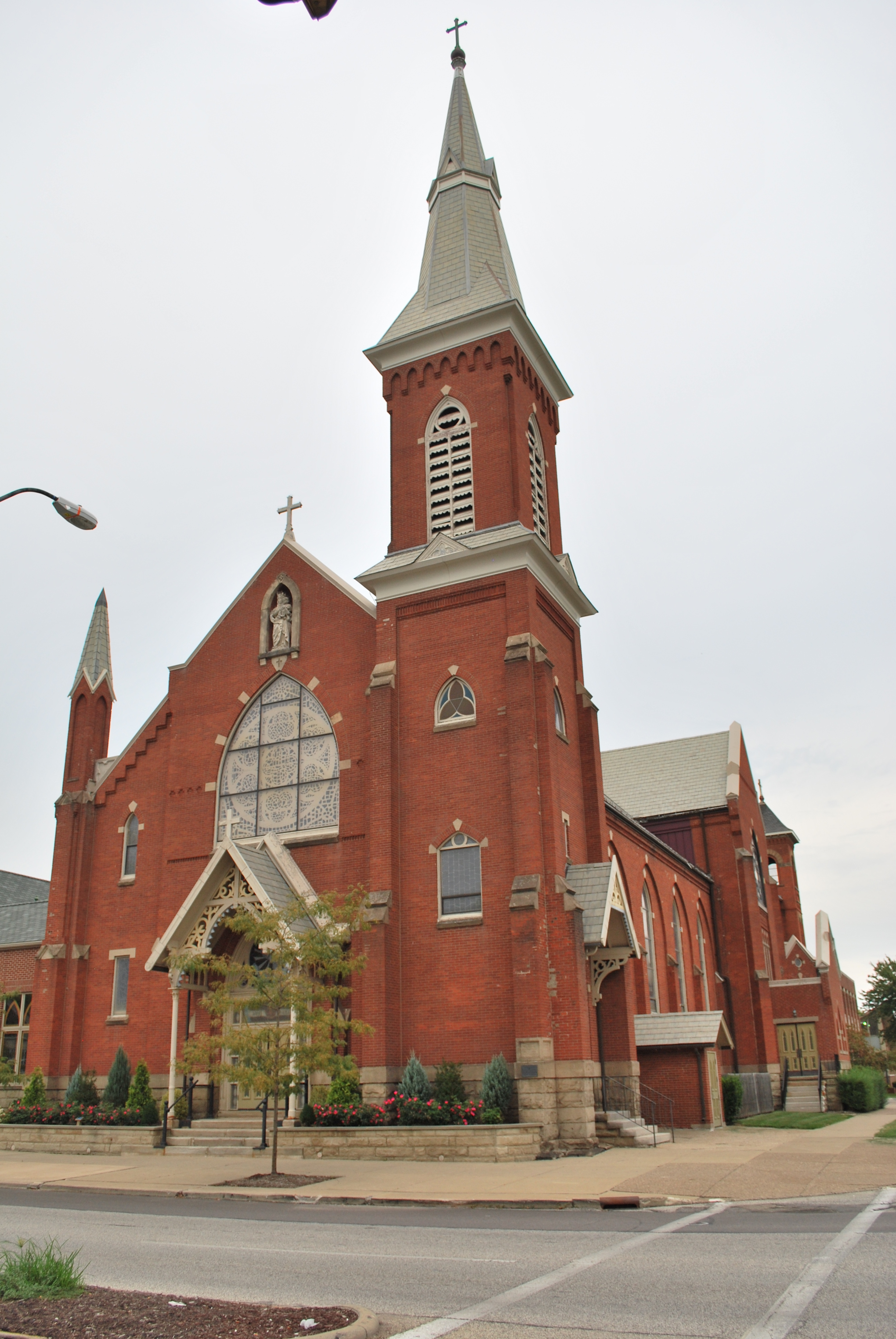

- Location within Ohio Location within the United States
- Location: 320 Middle Ave., Elyria, Ohio
- Coordinates: 41°21′52″N 82°6′24″W
- Area: less than one acre
- Built: 1883
- Architectural style: Gothic Revival
- MPS: Elyria MRA
- NRHP reference No.: 79002732
- Added to NRHP: August 13, 1979

St. Mary's Roman Catholic Church is a historic church at 320 Middle Avenue in Elyria, Ohio.

It was built in 1883 and added to the National Register of Historic Places in 1979.
