= 1946 Ohio gubernatorial election =

- November 5, 1946
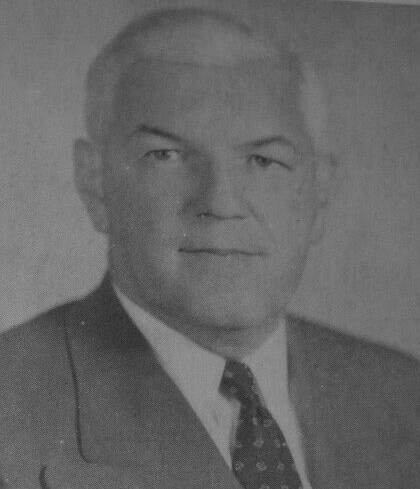

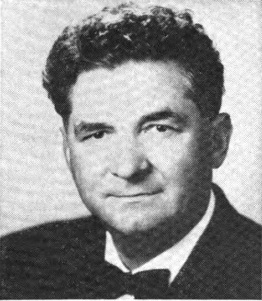
Nominee	Thomas J. Herbert	Frank Lausche
Party	Republican	Democratic
Popular vote	1,166,550	1,125,997
Percentage	50.64%	48.88%
- County results Herbert: 50–60% 60–70% Lausche: 50–60% 60–70%
Governor before election
Frank Lausche
Democratic
Elected Governor
Thomas J. Herbert
Republican

The 1946 Ohio gubernatorial election was held on November 5, 1946. Republican nominee Thomas J. Herbert defeated Democratic incumbent Frank Lausche with 50.64% of the vote.

== Primary elections ==
Primary elections were held on May 7, 1946.

=== Democratic primary ===
==== Candidates ====
- Frank Lausche, incumbent Governor
- Joseph Torok Jr.

==== Results ====
Democratic primary results
Party	Candidate	Votes	%
Democratic	Frank Lausche (incumbent)	291,635	89.21
Democratic	Joseph Torok Jr.	35,269	10.79
Total votes		326,904	100.00

=== Republican primary ===
==== Candidates ====
- Thomas J. Herbert, former Ohio Attorney General
- Albert Edward Payne

==== Results ====
Republican primary results
Party	Candidate	Votes	%
Republican	Thomas J. Herbert	296,654	86.79
Republican	Albert Edward Payne	45,137	13.21
Total votes		341,791	100.00

== General election ==
=== Candidates ===
Major party candidates

- Thomas J. Herbert, Republican
- Frank Lausche, Democratic

Other candidates

- Arla A. Albaugh, Socialist Labor

=== Results ===
1946 Ohio gubernatorial election
Party	Candidate	Votes	%	±%
Republican	Thomas J. Herbert	1,166,550	50.64%	
Democratic	Frank Lausche (incumbent)	1,125,997	48.88%	
Socialist Labor	Arla A. Albaugh	11,203	0.49%	
Majority		40,553		
Turnout		2,303,750		
Republican gain from Democratic		Swing		
