= St. Ladislaus Roman Catholic Church (Lorain, Ohio) =

Historic church in Ohio, United States

- U.S. National Register of Historic Places
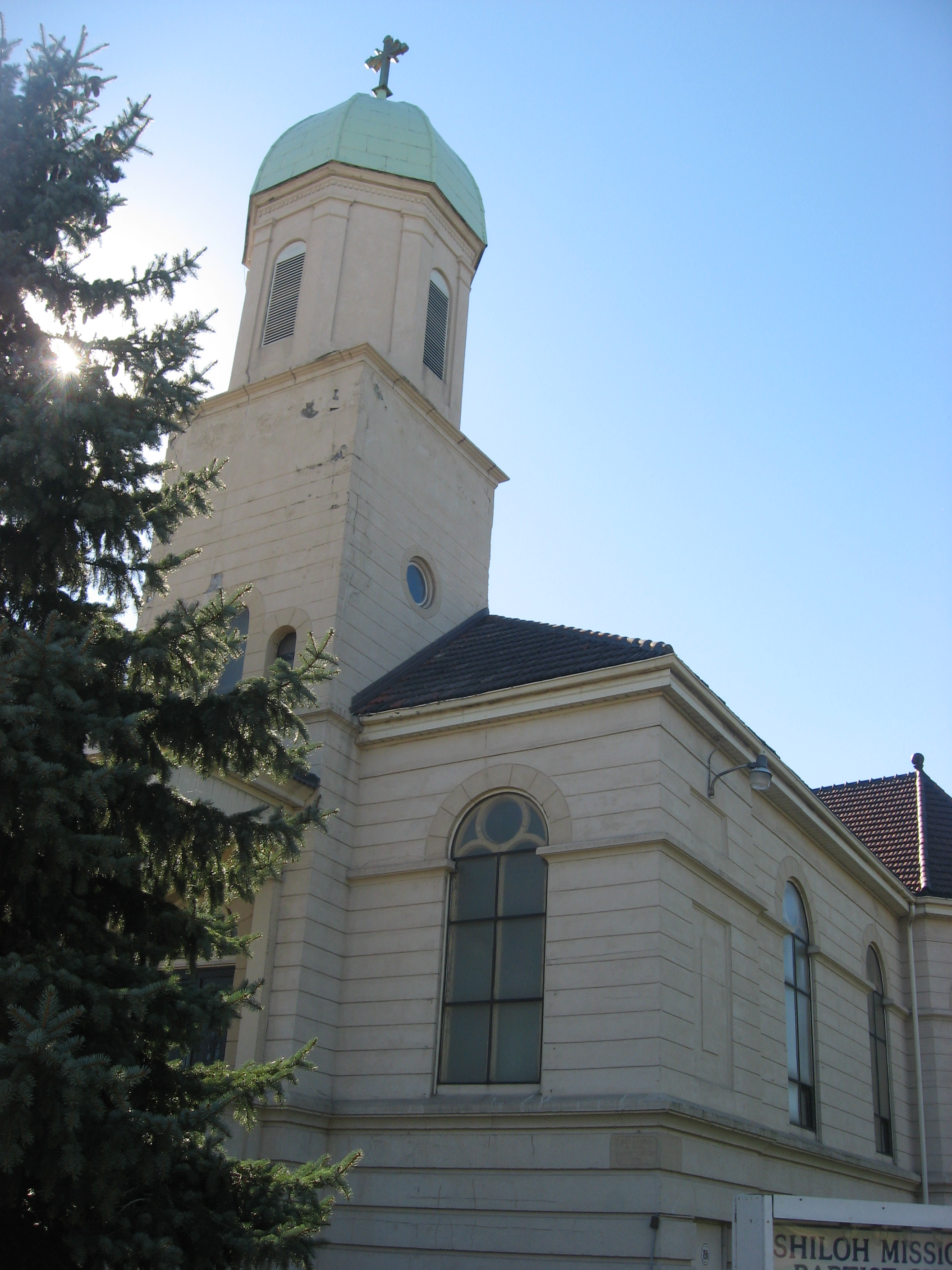
- Front and northern side

- Location within Ohio Location within the United States
- Location: 2908 Wood Ave., Lorain, Ohio
- Coordinates: 41°26′38″N 82°9′0″W
- Area: less than one acre
- Built: 1904
- Architect: Emile Uhlrich
- Architectural style: Romanesque
- NRHP reference No.: 82003607
- Added to NRHP: April 1, 1982

St. Ladislaus Roman Catholic Church was a historic church at 2908 Wood Avenue in Lorain, Ohio. The church was founded by Lorain's Hungarian community.

It was built in 1904 and added to the US's National Register of Historic Places in 1982. The church was closed in 2010 along with other local churches as part of a "reconfiguration" by the Roman Catholic Diocese of Cleveland. Statues from the church were restored and later added to the Museum of Divine Statues in Lakewood, Ohio in April 2011.
