= St. Clair–Superior =

Neighborhood of Cleveland, Ohio, United States

- Neighborhood of Cleveland
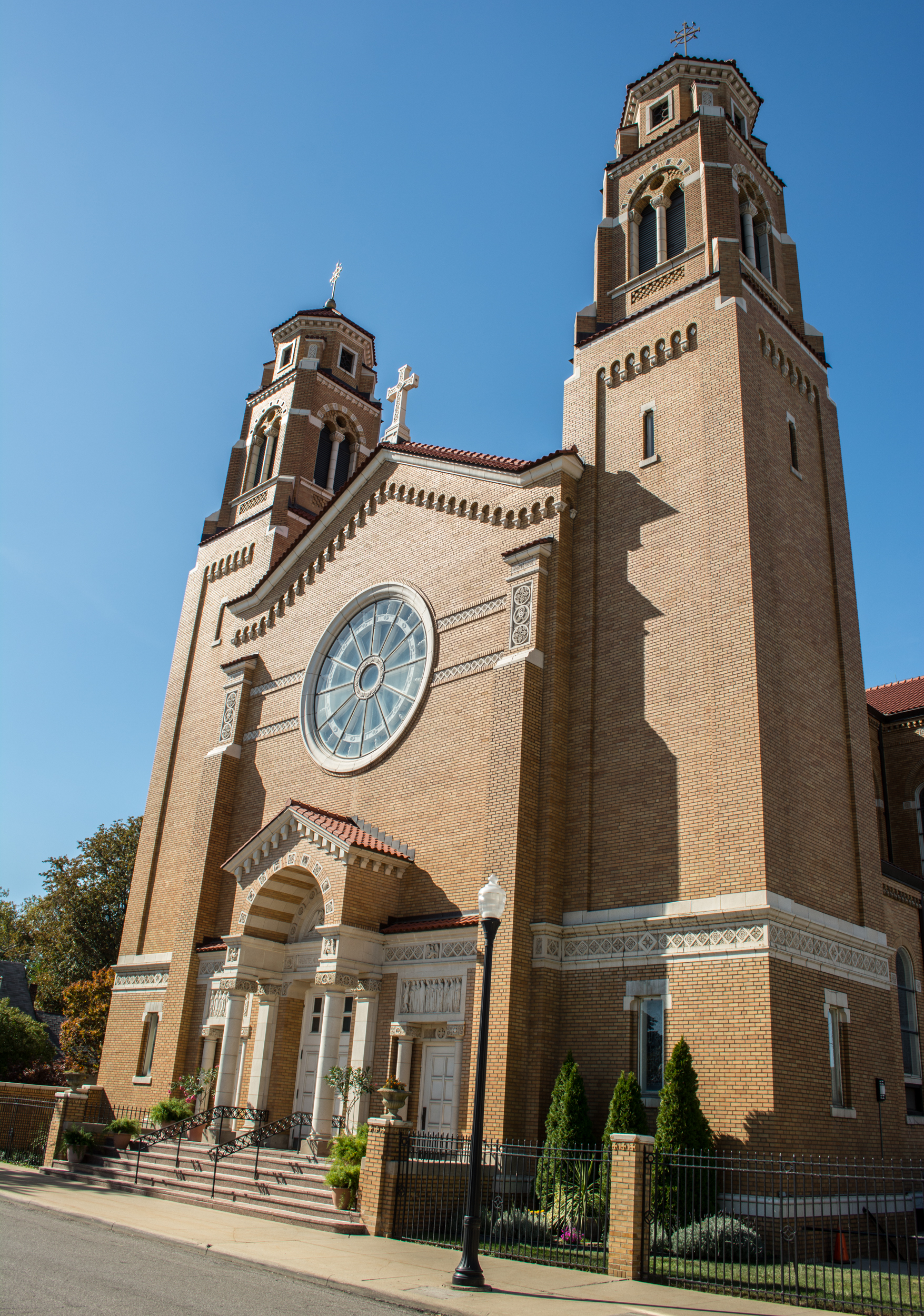
- St. Vitus church at the corner of East 61st and Lausche Avenue

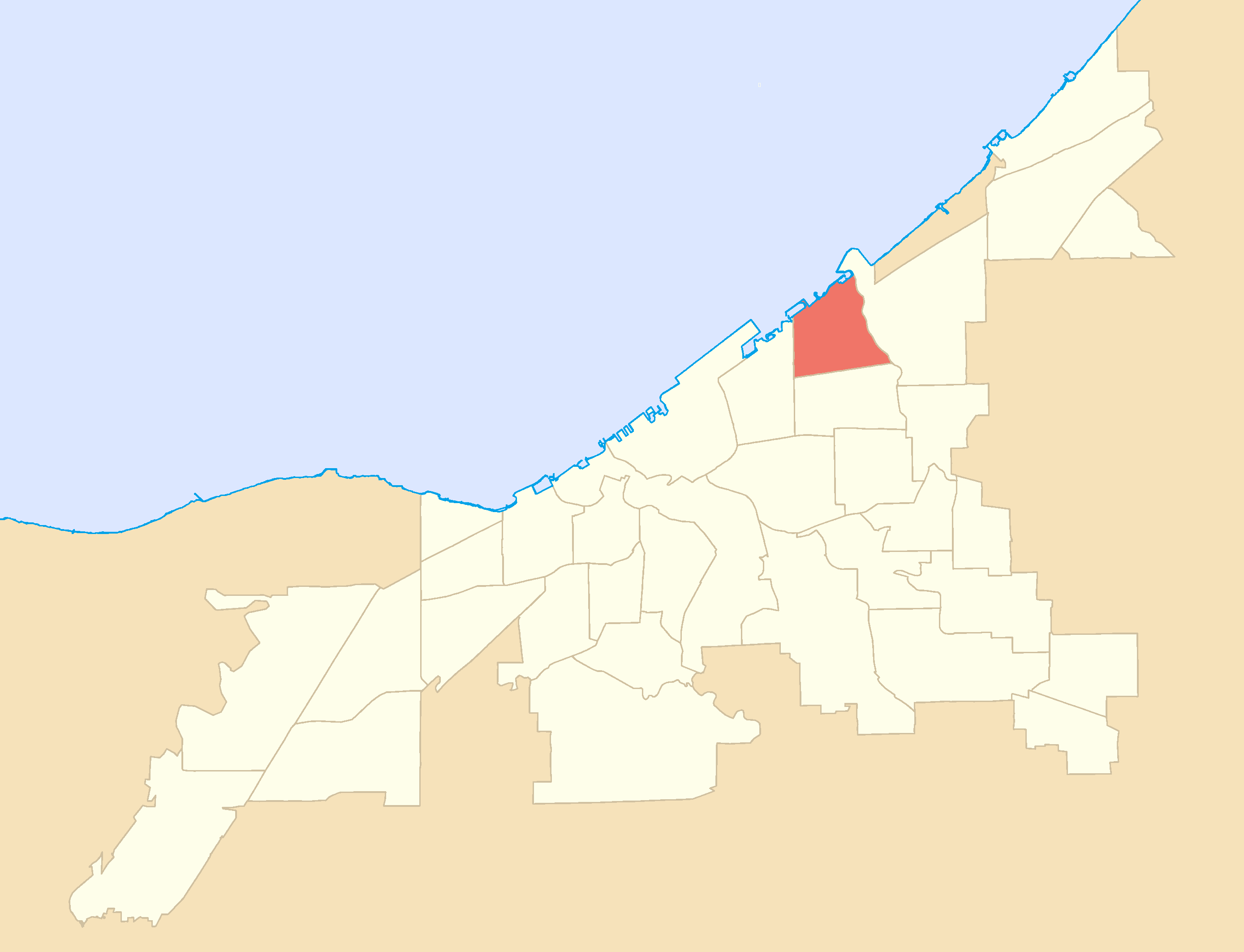
- Country: United States
- State: Ohio
- County: Cuyahoga
- City: Cleveland

Population (2020)
  - Total: 5,580

Demographics
  - White: 18.8%
  - Black: 75.6%
  - Hispanic (of any race): 5.8%
  - Asian and Pacific Islander: 1.5%
  - Mixed and Other: 4.2%
- Time zone: UTC-5 (EST)
  - Summer (DST): UTC-4 (EDT)
- ZIP Codes: 44103
- Area code: 216
- Median income: $22,961

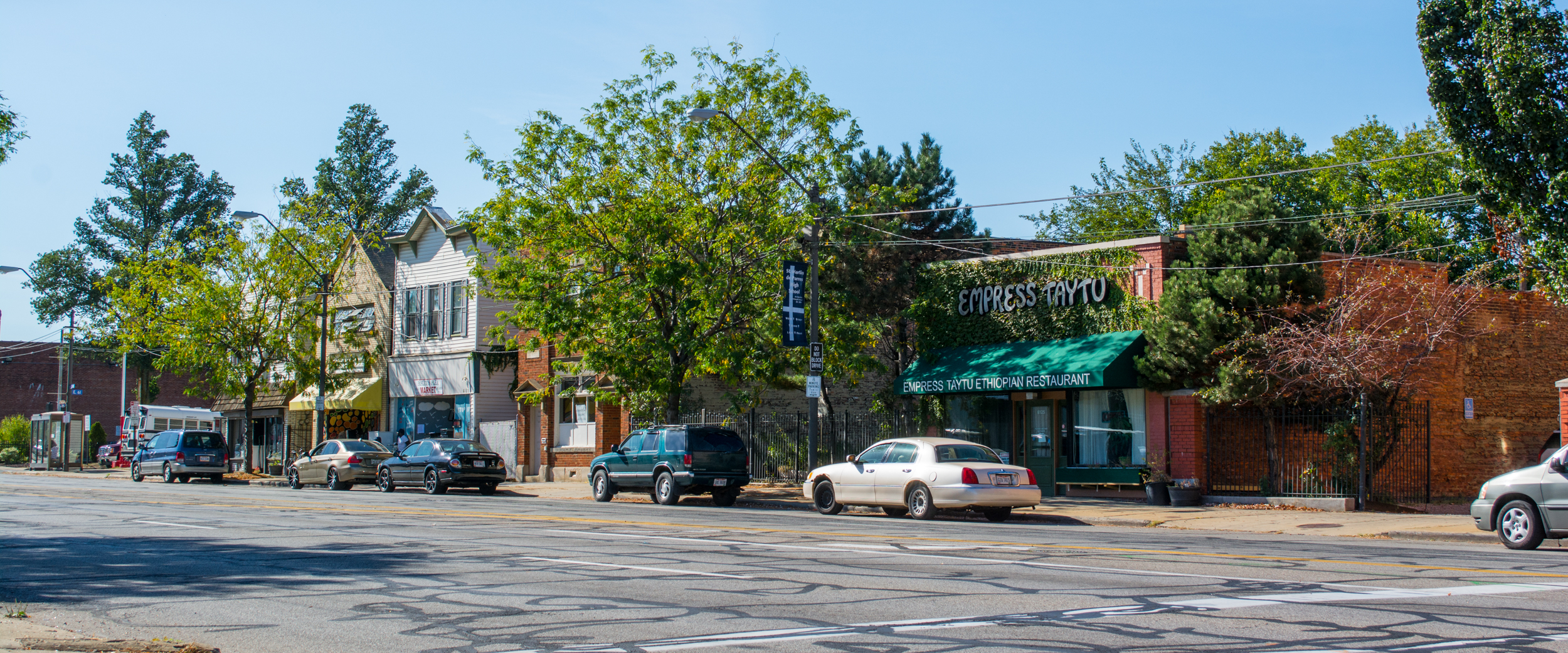
Northerly view of St. Clair Avenue near the intersection of E. 62nd Street

St. Clair–Superior is a neighborhood on the East Side in Cleveland, Ohio, in the United States. Largely settled in the 1880s and 1890s by Eastern European immigrants, white flight in the 1990s left the neighborhood largely African American. It is one of the oldest and most culturally diverse neighborhoods in Cleveland today.

== About the neighborhood ==
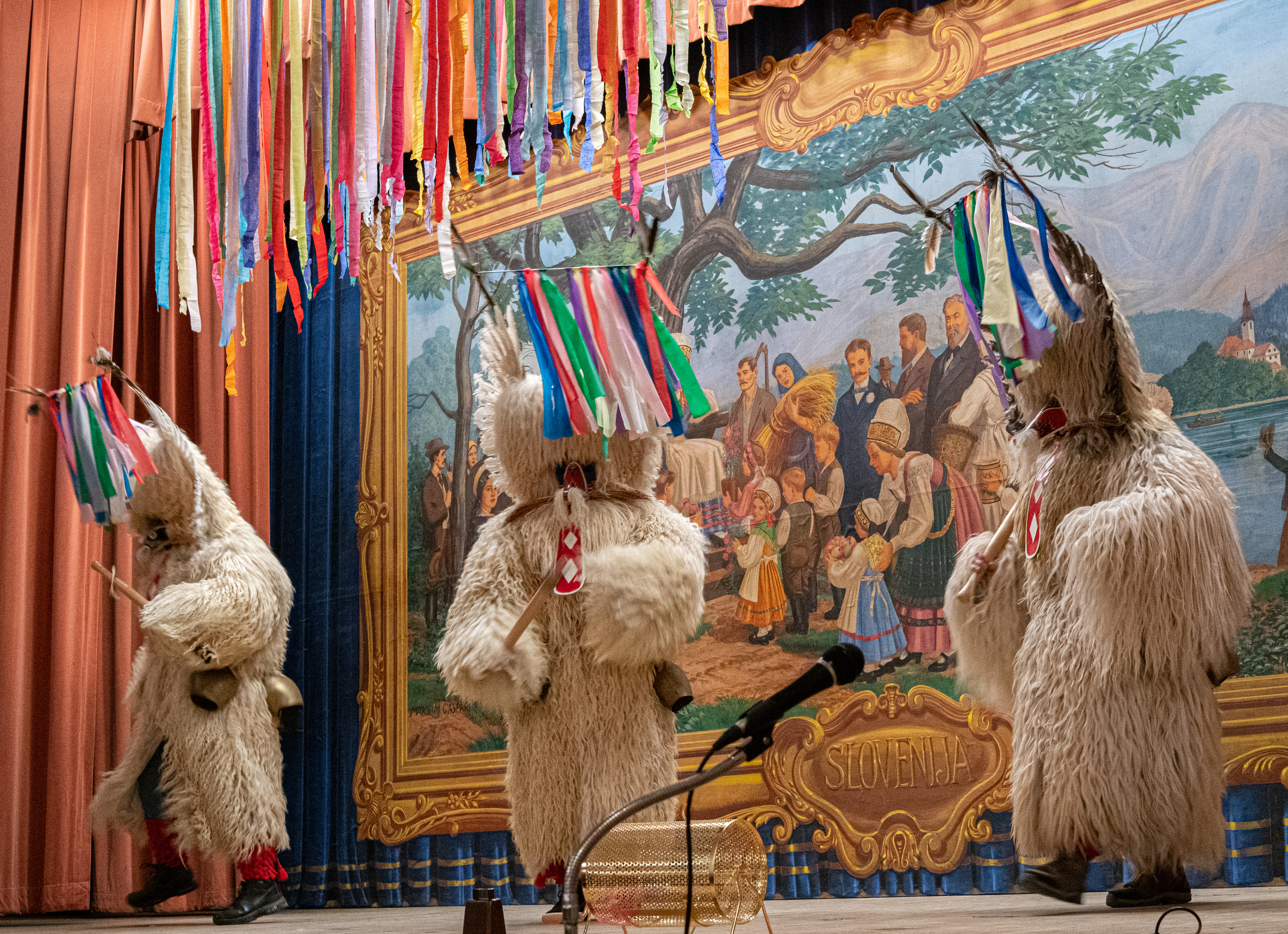
Annual Slovenian Kurentovanje celebration at the Slovenian National Home.

St. Clair–Superior boundaries are: E. 55th Street from Lake Erie south to Superior Avenue; Superior Avenue east to Martin Luther King Jr. Drive; Martin Luther King Jr. Drive north to Lake Erie.

The neighborhood lacks access to Lake Erie and Gordon Park due to the presence of Interstate 90 and major railroad tracks. Access to Rockefeller Park is also highly limited. The neighborhood's main retail district lines St. Clair Avenue.

== History of the neighborhood ==
St. Clair–Superior was largely rural and sparsely populated until the 1880s and 1890s, when extensive construction of heavy industry and manufacturing plants occurred along the railroad tracks and the area north of St. Clair Avenue. Large numbers of immigrant Slovenians and Lithuanians moved into the area to work in these plants. The historic St. Vitus's Church, at E. 61st and Lausche Avenue, was the first Slovenian Catholic church built in Cleveland, and at one time was among the largest Slovenian congregations in the United States. Eastern European immigrants brought with them a long beer-making tradition, and during the 1800s and early 1900s St. Clair–Superior neighborhood was known as "the mecca of breweries in Cleveland." In the summer of 2016, the brewing tradition returned to the neighborhood, with the opening of Goldhorn Brewery, which takes its name from a Slovenian folktale and features beers named to commemorate neighborhood specific people and places.

The majority of residents in the neighborhood were whites of Eastern European ancestry at least as late as 1991. A major demographic shift occurred in the 1990s and 2000s, so that by 2020 75.6 percent of residents were African American, and 18.8 percent white and 5.8 percent were Hispanic.

Connected to its Slovenian cultural roots, Cleveland Kurentovanje has been celebrated every year the weekend before Ash Wednesday since 2013.

In 2015, some redevelopment began to occur in the area. One of the biggest projects was Hub 55 on E. 55th Street, a redevelopment that housed a café, market, meeting space, and office space. Most of Hub 55 opened in June 2015. The investors in Hub 55 planned additional redevelopment as of the fall of 2017.

By 2015, 33 percent of all homes in the neighborhood had been demolished after falling into disrepair. Another 25 percent of homes in the neighborhood are vacant. Of these vacant homes, the Western Reserve Land Conservancy's Thriving Communities Institute property survey rated nearly 12 percent rate as "distressed" (an extreme degree of disrepair). This compares to just 9 percent in distressed neighborhoods like Buckeye–Woodhill, Glenville, Hough, and Kinsman.

The level of reported crime in St. Clair–Superior is not much different from those in gentrifying neighborhoods like Ohio City or Tremont. Unreported crime, however, remains high.

== Schools ==
St. Martin de Porres High School (a Catholic school) and a branch of Horizon Science Academy (a charter school) are both located in St. Clair–Superior.

In 2003, St. Martin de Porres High School, which was located in the former St. Vitus School building, began construction of a $30 million new campus a block away. The first, $21 million phase of the project opened in April 2018. The new building incorporated the facade and copper domes of the historic Kausek Brothers building, a former department store.
