= St. Paschal Baylon Parish (Highland Heights, Ohio) =

American Catholic community

Coordinates: 41°32′14.7″N 81°29′09.1″W

St. Paschal Baylon Parish is a Roman Catholic community founded in the ideals of the Blessed Sacrament.

In the early 1950s Father John O'Brien and Brother Edward Mullen established the parish in Highland Heights, Ohio. The parish quickly grew as it drew members from Highland Heights and the surrounding suburbs such as Euclid, South Euclid, Lyndhurst, Willoughby Hills, Mayfield Village, and Mayfield Heights.

As was custom of the time, parishes could only be named after canonized saints. The founder of the Order of the Blessed Sacrament, Peter Julian Eymard, at the time had not yet been canonized a saint, a status he holds today. Consequently, a student studying for the priesthood at the time suggested the parish be named after a Franciscan brother, St Paschal Baylon. The name was approved and the student, Father Donald Jette, later became the parish's third pastor.

Paschal Baylon was born on May 24, 1540, in modern-day Spain. Early in his life, Paschal would spend his days praying in the local Church. His parents were shepherds and needed his help in the fields, but were still supportive of Paschal's passion for the Blessed Sacrament. At the young age of 18, Paschal left home for Valencia, and became a Franciscan brother. Paschal Baylon was beatified by Pope Paul V and canonized a saint by Pope Alexander VIII, in 1690. He is the patron saint of chefs, cooks, and kitchens. St Paschal's Feast Day is on May 17, a weekend the parish hosts a Spring Fling Festival to honor him.

In 1954, a church, school, and rectory was constructed on the 20-acre property the parish stands on today. The Congregation of Notre Dame Sisters (CND) were invited to help run the new school, which opened in 1955 with 321 students. The first principal at St. Paschal Baylon was Mother Saint Edward. In 1963, the SSS Seminary then moved from its original location on Euclid Avenue, to the property next to the rectory where it stands today. The Seminary existed in this building for five years, when due to surging numbers, the students and faculty of the SSS moved to John Carroll University. The empty rooms and extra space then became utilized for parish offices and other uses by parishioners.

As the city transitioned from a rural community to a suburb, the population grew significantly. In order to accommodate the growing population and students in the school, the parish built a convent for the Sisters of Notre Dame (SND) that administered the school.

The original church built on the property held a capacity of 600 occupants. To once again accommodate the growing population, Father O'Brien along with Architect Richard Fleischman a new church to be recognized as a lamp atop a hill in order to fulfill the scripture passage found in the Book of Matthew (5:14-15). The new church was complete on April 8, 1971.

Parish life continued to grow, and the parish offices in the former SSS building could not accommodate the numbers. As a result, Father Mario Marzocchi, SSS, the sixth pastor of the parish, began a campaign to create a Parish Life Center. It was not until many years of fundraising that the seventh pastor, Father Michael Arkins, SSS, inaugurated the building drive. The Parish Life Center was completed in 2001. An additional gymnasium was also constructed at this time and was dedicated to Father Donald Jette, SSS, for his service to the parish.

In 1999, Deacon Joe Bourgeious, SSS, developed what became the Helping Hands Ministry. The Helping Hands provides services to those needing food, clothing, care and other services.

In 2009, St. Paschal Baylon School was awarded the "Blue Ribbon School of Excellence," by the United States Department of Education.

The parish was presided over the direction of its eighth pastor and former student at St. Paschal Baylon School, Fr. John Thomas Lane, SSS. The parish is now presided over by the direction of its ninth pastor, Reverend Sebastian Rosario Pushparaj, SSS Pastor update
