= St. Patrick's Catholic Church (Wellington, Ohio) =

Historic church in Ohio, United States

- Old St. Patrick's Church
- U.S. National Register of Historic Places
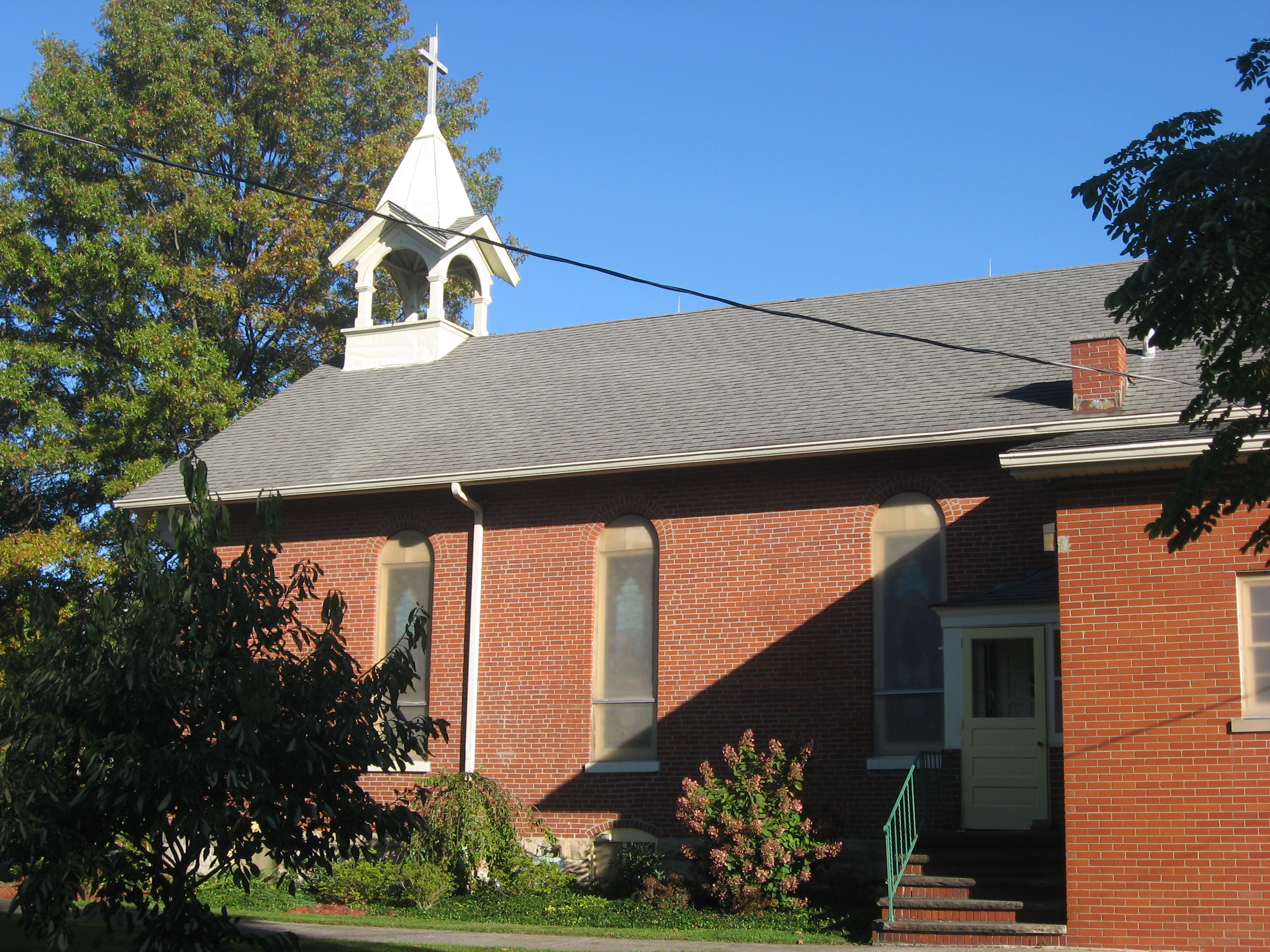
- Southern side

- Location within Ohio Location within the United States
- Location: 512 N. Main St., Wellington, Ohio
- Coordinates: 41°10′27″N 82°13′0″W
- Area: less than one acre
- Built: 1875
- Architect: Calkins, Wood & Couch
- NRHP reference No.: 79001890
- Added to NRHP: March 21, 1979

Old St. Patrick's Church (also known as Old North Primary School) is a historic church at 512 N. Main Street in Wellington, Ohio.

It was built in 1875 and added to the National Register of Historic Places in 1979.

Parish website: StPatrickWellington.com
