= Frank Lausche =

American politician (1895–1990)

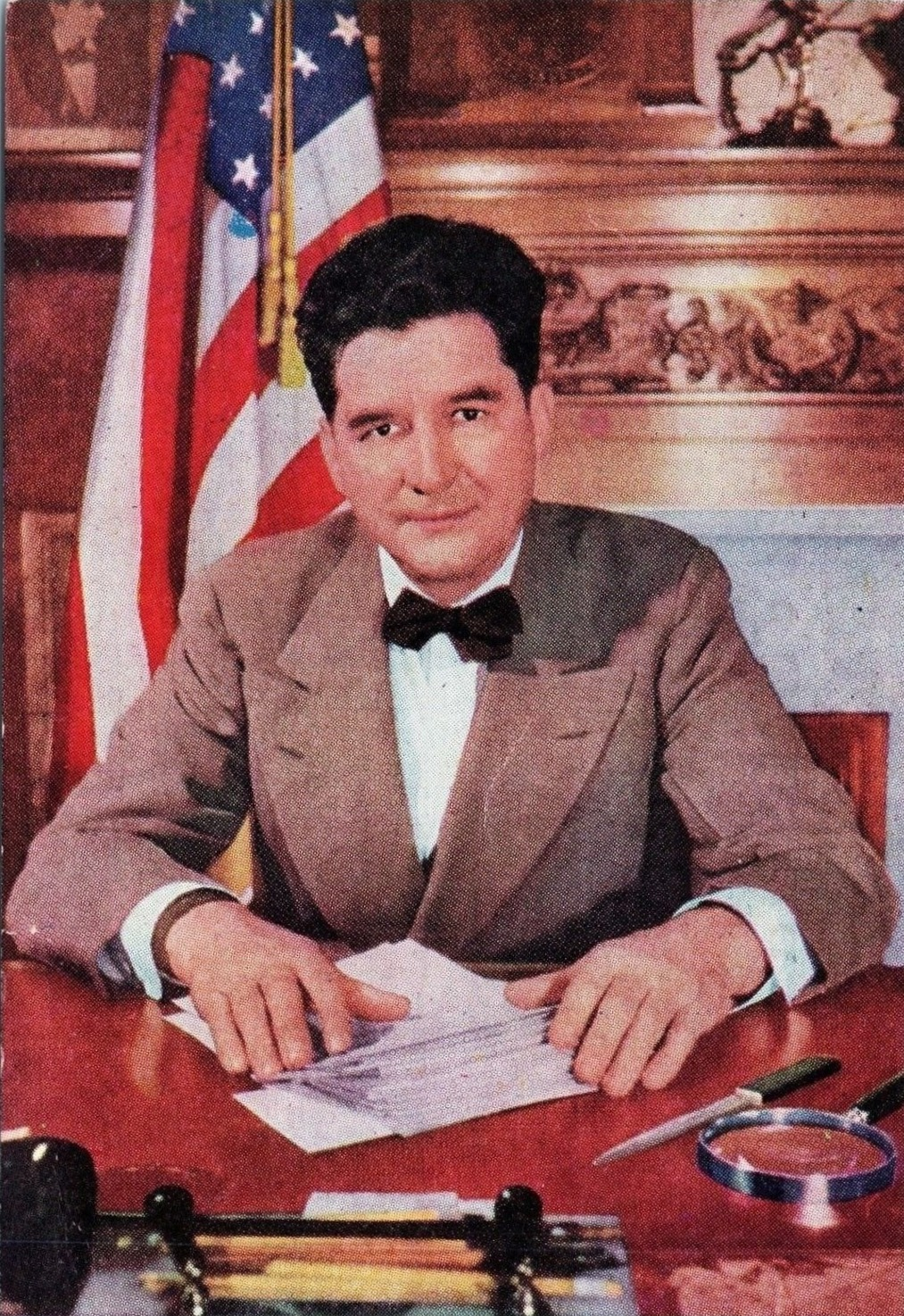
- Lausche c. 1948

United States Senator from Ohio
- In office January 3, 1957 – January 3, 1969
- Preceded by: George H. Bender
- Succeeded by: William B. Saxbe

Chair of the National Governors Association
- In office June 18, 1950 – September 30, 1951
- Preceded by: Frank Carlson
- Succeeded by: Val Peterson

55th and 57th Governor of Ohio
- In office January 10, 1949 – January 3, 1957
- Lieutenant: George D. Nye; John William Brown
- Preceded by: Thomas J. Herbert
- Succeeded by: John William Brown
- In office January 8, 1945 – January 13, 1947
- Lieutenant: George D. Nye
- Preceded by: John W. Bricker
- Succeeded by: Thomas J. Herbert

47th Mayor of Cleveland
- In office January 1, 1942 – December 31, 1944
- Preceded by: Edward J. Blythin
- Succeeded by: Thomas A. Burke

Personal details
- Born: Frank John Lausche; November 14, 1895 Cleveland, Ohio, U.S.
- Died: April 21, 1990 (aged 94) Cleveland, Ohio, U.S.
- Resting place: Calvary Cemetery
- Party: Democratic
- Spouse: Jane Sheal
- Education: Cleveland State University (LLB)

Frank John Lausche (/ˈlaʊʃi/; November 14, 1895 – April 21, 1990) was an American lawyer and politician who served as the 55th and 57th governor of Ohio from 1945 to 1947 and from 1949 to 1957, and as a U.S. senator for Ohio from 1957 to 1969. A member of the Democratic Party, he also served as the 47th mayor of Cleveland from 1942 to 1944 and worked as a trial lawyer and judge in Cuyahoga County, Ohio.

== Early life and baseball career ==
Lausche was born on November 14, 1895, in Cleveland, Ohio, the son of Frances (née Milavec) and Louis Lausche. His family was of Slovenian origin. Lausche attended St. Vitus Grade School grades one to four, St. Francis Grade School in grade five and Madison Grammar School grades six to eight. He then went to Central Institute Preparatory School. He dropped out of school in 1911, when his older brother died, to help support his family.

Lausche played baseball locally when not working, and was recruited as a third baseman to the amateur White Motor team, which won a national championship. He was noticed by scouts and reported to the Duluth White Sox in Duluth, Minnesota, of the Class D Northern League in the spring of 1916. He started the season batting .422, but developed trouble hitting curve balls, and was released after 31 games. He signed with a semi-pro team in Virginia, Minnesota. He performed poorly for two weeks before returning to Cleveland, and amateur ball.

During the spring of 1917, Lausche reported to the Class B Lawrence Barristers in Lawrence, Massachusetts, of the Eastern League. He started well, but was released after 27 games. He enlisted in the United States Army that summer, and reported to Camp Gordon, near Atlanta, Georgia. He was noticed playing baseball, and was asked to join the camp baseball team. He was promoted to second lieutenant after eight months, and assigned to officers' training school. His high batting average "spared him a trip across the ocean to the front lines." The team manager at the camp was Charles Frank, who in peacetime owned and managed the Atlanta Crackers of the Class AA Southern Association. After World War I ended in November 1918, but before Lausche was discharged in January 1919, Frank offered Lausche a six-month contract, at $225 per month if he would report at spring training. Lausche had also completed high school while in the Army.

== Legal and political career ==
Lausche entered the Cleveland-Marshall School of Law early on 1919, and decided to continue in law school that spring, rather than report to spring training. He graduated from the law school in 1921. He was ranked second in his class and quickly became known as one of Cleveland's better trial lawyers. Lausche served as a Cleveland Municipal Court judge from 1932 to 1937 and Cuyahoga County Common Pleas Court judge from 1937 to 1941, before winning election as mayor of Cleveland in the 1941 Cleveland mayoral election.

=== Governor of Ohio (1945–1947, 1949–1957) ===
Lausche served as mayor until 1944, when he first won the 1944 Ohio gubernatorial election. He was the first Roman Catholic to be governor of Ohio. Lausche served as governor from 1945 to 1947, when he narrowly lost the 1946 Ohio gubernatorial election to Thomas J. Herbert. Lausche defeated Herbert in a 1948 rematch, however, and served four consecutive two-year terms from 1949 to 1957. He was reelected as governor in 1950, defeating state Treasurer Don H. Ebright; in 1952, defeating Cincinnati Mayor Charles Phelps Taft II; and in 1954, defeating state Auditor Jim Rhodes, who later became governor himself. Lausche resigned in early 1957, having won election to the United States Senate in November 1956, unseating incumbent Republican George Bender.

=== U.S. Senator (1957–1969) ===
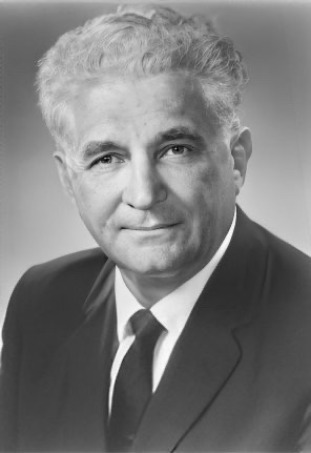
Lausche as a U.S. senator, c. 1957–1969

In his first term, with the Senate almost evenly split, Lausche gave Senate Democratic leader Lyndon B. Johnson a scare by hinting that he might vote for Republican William F. Knowland for Senate Majority Leader, although he ultimately did not. Throughout his career, Lausche displayed a bipartisan and independent approach to politics, being known by some as a "Democrat with a small 'd'", but his approach to ethnic Democratic politics paved the way for followers such as Ralph S. Locher, who became Mayor of Cleveland and later an associate justice of the Ohio Supreme Court, and Bronis Klementowicz, a leader of Cleveland City Council and law director under Locher.

Lausche's independence also earned him, among some, the derisive moniker, "Frank the Fence." He was easily re-elected to the Senate in 1962, but was defeated in his bid for renomination in 1968, due to his loss of labor union support. He lost the Democratic primary against former Congressman John J. Gilligan by a 55% to 45% margin, and in the general election, Lausche refused to support Gilligan, who went on to lose the general election to then-state Attorney General William B. Saxbe. Lausche also endorsed Richard Nixon for president that year, which was a factor in Nixon's narrow victory in Ohio.

Lausche was a very popular, plain-spoken, big-city politician of the old school. He was credited with building a coalition of ethnic voters in Cleveland known as the "cosmopolitan Democrats." There is some evidence that Republican presidential candidate Dwight D. Eisenhower in 1952 considered asking Lausche to become his running mate and is said to have been considered in the Republican 1956 campaign by Leonard Hall in a presidential meeting.

== Retirement and death ==
In retirement, Lausche and his wife, Jane, lived in Bethesda, Maryland. Jane Lausche died November 24, 1981, and, having converted to the Roman Catholic faith, was buried at Calvary Cemetery in southeast Cleveland. Lausche continued to live in Bethesda until contracting pneumonia in January 1990. He was flown back to Cleveland, and was admitted to the Slovenian Home for the Aged on February 20, where he died of congestive heart failure on April 21, 1990, at the age of 94.

Lausche's funeral was at St. Vitus Church, with Bishop Anthony Edward Pevec delivering the homily. He was buried at Calvary Cemetery. His tombstone was incorrectly inscribed with a birth date of 1898.

== Honors and legacy ==
Lausche was named a Knight of St John of Malta by Pope John Paul II, "the highest civilian honor that can be bestowed by the Catholic Church".

The State of Ohio's office building in Cleveland, Ohio is named after Lausche, as is the Lausche Building at the Ohio Expo Center (site of the Ohio State Fair). In 2005, James E. Odenkirk authored the book Frank J. Lausche: Ohio's Great Political Maverick, an in-depth look at Lausche's political career. In the early 1990s, Ohio's Lincoln was published.

Lausche Avenue (formerly Glass Avenue), a street that spans between East 60th and East 64th Streets adjacent St. Vitus church in the St. Clair-Superior neighborhood on Cleveland's East Side, is named for Lausche, whose family were members of the parish as well as residents of the neighborhood.

A bust of Lausche is displayed at St. Mary of the Assumption Church in Cleveland's Collinwood neighborhood, and an exhibit of Lausche artifacts is displayed at Cleveland's Slovenian Museum and Archives.

== See also ==
- Ohio gubernatorial elections

== Sources ==
- Odenkirk, James E. (2005). Frank J. Lausche Ohio's Great Political Maverick. Wilmington, Ohio: Orange Frazer Press. ISBN 1882203496.

Political offices
Preceded by Edward J. Blythin	Mayor of Cleveland; 1942–1944	Succeeded by Thomas A. Burke
Preceded by John W. Bricker	Governor of Ohio; 1945–1947	Succeeded by Thomas J. Herbert
Preceded by Thomas J. Herbert	Governor of Ohio; 1949–1957	Succeeded by John William Brown
Preceded by Frank Carlson	Chair of the National Governors Association; 1950–1951	Succeeded by Val Peterson
Party political offices
Preceded by John McSweeney	Democratic nominee for Governor of Ohio; 1944, 1946, 1948, 1950, 1952, 1954	Succeeded by Michael DiSalle
Preceded by Thomas A. Burke	Democratic nominee for U.S. Senator from Ohio (Class 3); 1956, 1962	Succeeded by John J. Gilligan
U.S. Senate
Preceded by George H. Bender	U.S. Senator (Class 3) from Ohio; 1957–1969; Served alongside: John W. Bricker, Stephen M. Young	Succeeded by William B. Saxbe
