= Thomas J. Herbert =

American judge

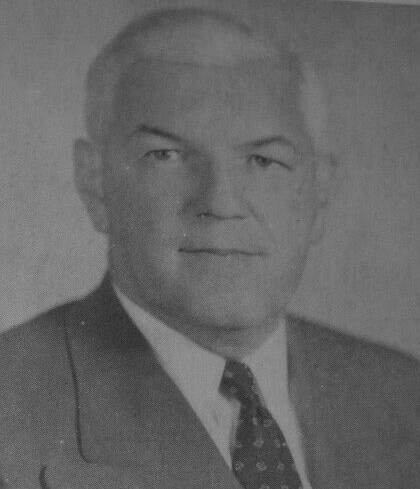

56th Governor of Ohio
- In office January 13, 1947 – January 10, 1949
- Lieutenant: Paul M. Herbert
- Preceded by: Frank J. Lausche
- Succeeded by: Frank J. Lausche

34th Ohio Attorney General
- In office 1939–1945
- Governor: John W. Bricker
- Preceded by: Herbert S. Duffy
- Succeeded by: Hugh S. Jenkins

Associate Justice of the Ohio Supreme Court
- In office January, 1957 – January 1963
- Preceded by: William L. Hart
- Succeeded by: Paul M. Herbert

Personal details
- Born: Thomas John Herbert; October 28, 1894 Cleveland, Ohio, U.S.
- Died: October 26, 1974 (aged 79) Columbus, Ohio, U.S.
- Party: Republican
- Spouse(s): Jeanette Judson, Mildred Helen Stevenson
- Children: John D. Herbert
- Education: Case Western Reserve University School of Law

Thomas John Herbert (October 28, 1894 – October 26, 1974) was an American Republican politician from Ohio. He was the 56th governor of Ohio.

Herbert was born in Cleveland, Ohio. During World War I Herbert served in the Army Air Service. While flying with No. 56 Squadron RAF in France, he was wounded in action 8 August 1918. He was awarded the British Distinguished Flying Cross & American Distinguished Service Cross.

After the war, Herbert returned to Ohio, where he graduated from Case Western Reserve University School of Law in 1919, and practiced law. He served as State Attorney General from 1939 to 1945. In the Republican landslide year of 1946, Herbert defeated incumbent governor Frank J. Lausche. Lausche defeated Herbert in the latter's bid for re-election two years later. Herbert served as a justice of the Ohio Supreme Court from 1957 until 1963. He suffered a stroke March 21, 1961, and decided not to run for re-election.

Herbert married Jeanette Judson of Cleveland on April 30, 1919, and they had four children. Jeanette died December 30, 1945. Herbert remarried, while Governor, Mildred Helen Stevenson of Indianapolis on January 3, 1948. They had one daughter. Mildred died in 1962. Herbert died October 26, 1974, at age 79, after years of illness.

His son John D. Herbert was Ohio State Treasurer for two terms, 1963 to 1971 and an unsuccessful candidate for Ohio Attorney General in 1970.

Legal offices
Preceded by Herbert S. Duffy	Ohio Attorney General; 1939–1945	Succeeded by Hugh S. Jenkins
Political offices
Preceded by Frank J. Lausche	Governor of Ohio; 1947–1949	Succeeded by Frank J. Lausche
Party political offices
Preceded by	Republican nominee for Attorney General of Ohio; 1938, 1940, 1942	Succeeded by Hugh S. Jenkins
Preceded by James Garfield Stewart	Republican Party nominee for Governor of Ohio; 1946, 1948	Succeeded by Don H. Ebright
