= St. Vitus's Church, Cleveland =

Coordinates: 41.522893°N 81.648867°W

St. Vitus
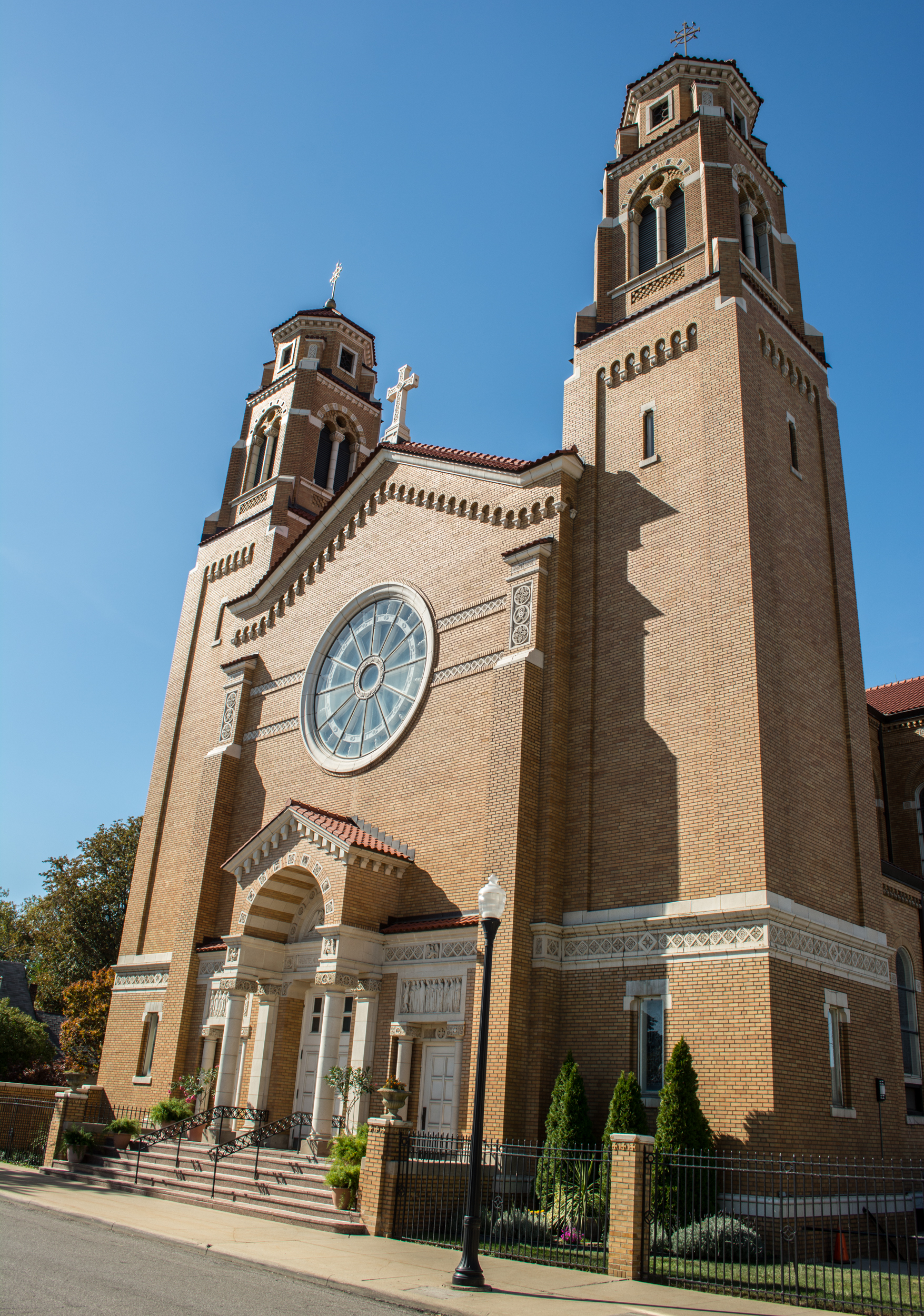
- St. Vitus Church in 2017
- St. Vitus
- Location: 6019 Lausche Ave, Cleveland, Ohio
- Country: United States
- Denomination: Roman Catholic
- Website: http://saintvitus.org

History
- Founded: July 29, 1893

Architecture
- Architect: William Jansen
- Style: Lombard-Roman
- Groundbreaking: 1930
- Completed: 1932
- Construction cost: $350,000

Administration
- Diocese: Roman Catholic Diocese of Cleveland

Clergy
- Bishop: Nelson J. Perez
- Pastor: Rev. Joseph P. Božnar

St. Vitus is a parish of the Roman Catholic Church in Cleveland, Ohio, United States, in the Diocese of Cleveland. The parish church, located at 6019 Lausche Avenue in the St. Clair-Superior neighborhood, was completed in 1932.

== History ==
The first documented Slovenian to settle in the Cleveland area was Joseph Turk, who came about 1883, most likely from Carniola, and settled on Marble Avenue, near the steel mills. He helped organize the Catholic Slovenes in Cleveland, and requested that Bishop Richard Gilmour of Cleveland appoint a permanent Slovenian priest in Cleveland. Soon after, Joseph Turk began gathering money from prospective parishioners to form a parish.

Finally, in 1893, Monsignor Vitus Hribar became the first pastor at the temporary headquarters of St. Peter's Church on East 17th in Cleveland. Eventually, in June 1894, land was purchased for the parish at the northwest corner of Norwood and Glass Avenues (Glass Avenue is now known as Lausche Ave). After a $6,000 construction, the first Church of St. Vitus stood on the present location of St. Martin DePorres High School. After disagreements between parishioners and Right Reverend Monsignor Hribar, a new pastor by the name of Right Reverend Monsignor Bartholomew Ponikvar was assigned in 1907.

Monsignor Ponikvar gradually quelled differences in opinion about how funding should be appropriated for the parish. From there, Monsignor Ponikvar set out to build a new three-story school, and was completed shortly after 1912. However, the largest goal of Monsignor Ponikvar was to yet to come. He set out to build a new church to serve the quickly-growing parish. After a two-year construction, in 1932, the second St. Vitus Church was constructed on East 61st and Glass Avenue. It cost about $350,000 ($8,700,000 in 2025 dollars). The architect was William Jansen of Cleveland. It still stands as the largest Slovenian church in the United States of America.

After the death of Monsignor Ponikvar in 1952, the third pastor of St. Vitus was assigned. Monsignor Louis B. Baznik was a former parishioner and son of a founder of the parish. His first project was the dedication of four new bronze bells to the Holy Trinity, the Virgin Mary, Saint Vitus, and Saint Aloysius in the west bell tower of Saint Vitus Church. Soon after, in 1955, he set out to have an auditorium/gymnasium constructed at the site of the former church, as well as a convent. In addition to these additions, revisions to the school made it more competitive to other schools in the Cleveland area. Parishioners, expecting Monsignor Baznik to remain with the parish for the rest of his life, were shocked to learn that he was reassigned to St. Patrick's in Geauga County, and thus a new pastor was named in 1969.

Fr. Praznik was named pastor of St. Vitus and worked hard to maintain the school, but after a short six years, he suffered many severe heart attacks and a new pastor was named. Fr. Pevec (later Bishop Pevec) was installed in May 1975 and was, like Monsignor Baznik, expected to stay his entire life as pastor. However, he left in 1979 to become rector of Borromeo College of Ohio. Even though Fr. Pevec stayed a short time at St. Vitus, he worked to bring St. Vitus School's enrollment to the highest numbers ever. Succeeding him in 1979 was Fr. Jožef Božnar. He prepared well for the fiftieth anniversary of the Church building in 1982, as well as the 75th anniversary of the Church building in 2007. In February 1993, the interior of the church went through a six-month renovation, during which time world-acclaimed Slovenian painters traveled to St. Vitus to work on the interior. It was finished for the centennial celebration of the parish later that year.

St. Vitus remains a strong parish, but Fr. Božnar works with Bishop Lennon's programs to cluster parishes in order to increase strength for inner-city parishes.

== Architecture ==
The church building of St. Vitus itself is constructed in the Lombard-Roman style with pale yellow Falston brick. It is 141 feet long and 100 feet wide with an attached parish house on its west side. Its two Romanesque bell towers reach 110 feet into the sky. The Holtkamp organ, which is still in service, remains in the rear and largest of the three choir lofts. The church is located on Lausche Avenue (previously Glass Avenue), renamed in honor of former parishioner, Mayor of Cleveland and Governor of Ohio, Frank Lausche.

== Pastors ==
1. Monsignor Hribar 1893-1907
2. Monsignor Ponikvar 1907-1952
3. Monsignor Baznik 1952-1969
4. Fr. Praznik 1969-1975
5. Fr. Pevec 1975-1979
6. Fr. Božnar 1979–present
