= List of Ohio politicians by state office =

== Executive ==
=== Governors of Ohio and candidates ===
Name	Life dates	Party	Candidate	Served
John Kenneth Blackwell	1948–Present	Republican	2006	
Bob Fitrakis	1955–Present	Green	2006	
Bill Peirce	1938–Present	Libertarian	2006	
Ted Strickland	1941–Present	Democrat	2006	2007–2011
Robert Alphonso Taft II	1942–Present	Republican	1998	1999– 2007
Lee Fisher	1951–Present	Democrat	1998	
Nancy Putnam Hollister	1949–Present	Republican		1998–1999
Robert L. Burch Jr.		Democrat	1994	
George Victor Voinovich	1936–2016	Republican	1990, 1994	1991–1998
Richard F. Celeste		Democrat	1978, 1982, 1986	1983–1991
James A. Rhodes	1909–	Republican	1950, 1954, 1962, 1966	1975–1983
John J. Gilligan		Democrat		1971–1975
James A. Rhodes	1909–	Republican	1950, 1954, 1962, 1966	1963–1971
Michael V. DiSalle	1908–	Democrat	1956, 1959	1959–1963
C. William O'Neill		Republican		1957–1959
John W. Brown		Republican		1957-1957
Frank J. Lausche		Democrat		1949–1957
Thomas J. Herbert		Republican		1947–1949
Frank J. Lausche		Democrat		1945–1947
John W. Bricker		Republican		1939–1945
Martin L. Davey		Democrat		1935–1939
George White		Democrat		1931–1935
Myers Y. Cooper		Republican		1929–1931
A. Vic Donahey		Democrat		1927–1929
Harry L. Davis		Republican		1921–1923
James M. Cox		Democrat		1917–1921
Frank B. Willis		Republican		1915–1917
James M. Cox		Democrat		1913–1915
Judson Harmon		Democrat		1909–1911
Andrew L. Harris		Republican		1906–1909
John M. Pattison		Democrat		1906-1906
Myron T. Herrick		Republican		1904–1906
George K. Nash		Republican		1900–1902
Asa S.Bushnell		Republican		1896–1900
William McKinley, Jr		Republican		1892–1896
James E. Campbell		Democrat		1890–1892
Joseph B. Foraker		Republican		1886–1888
George Hoadly		Democrat		1884–1886
Charles Foster		Republican		1880–1882
Richard M. Bishop		Democrat		1878–1880
Thomas I. Young		Republican		1877–1878
Rutherford B. Hayes		Republican		1876–1877
William Allen		Democrat		1874–1876
Edward F. Noyes		Republican		1872–1874
Rutherford B. Hayes		Republican		1868–1872
Jacob Dolson Cox		Republican		1866–1868
Charles Anderson		Republican		1865–1866
John Brough		Republican		1864–1865
David Tod		Republican		1862–1864
William Dennison, Jr.		Republican		1860–1862
Salmon P. Chase		Republican		1856–1860
William Medill		Democrat		1853–1856
Reuben Wood		Democrat		1850–1853
Seabury Ford		Whig		1848–1850
William Bebb		Whig		1846–1848
Mordeccai Bartley		Whig		1844–1846
Thomas W. Bartley		Democrat		1844-1844
Wilson Shannon		Democrat		1842–1844
Thomas Corwin		Whig		1840–1842
Wilson Shannon		Democrat		1838–1840
Joseph Vance		Whig		1836–1838
Robert Lucas		Democrat		1832–1836
Duncan McArthur		Federalist		1830–1832
Allen Trimble		Federalist		1826–1830
Jeremiah Morrow		Democrat		1822–1826
Allen Trimble		Federalist		1822–1824
Ethan Allen Brown		Democrat		1818–1822
Thomas Worthington		Democrat		1814–1818
Othneil Looker		Democrat		1814-1814
Jonathan Meigs		Democrat		1810–1814
Samuel Huntington		Democrat		1808–1810
Thomas Kirker		Democrat		1807–1808
Edward Tiffin		Democrat		1803–1807
Charles W. Byrd				1802–1803
Arthur St. Clair				1788–1802

=== Lieutenant governors of Ohio and candidates ===
Name	Life dates	Party	Candidate	Served
Jon Husted		Republican		2019-
Mary Taylor		Republican		2011-2019
Lee Fisher	1951–Present	Democrat	2006	2007-2011
Mark Noble	1976–Present	Libertarian	2006	
Tom Raga	1965–Present	Republican	2006	
Bruce Edward Johnson		Republican	–	2004–2007
Jennette Bradley		Republican	2002	2003–2004
Maureen O'Connor		Republican	1998	1999–2003
Nancy Hollister		Republican	1994	1995–1999
Mike DeWine	1947–Present	Republican	1990	1991–1995
Paul Leonard		Democrat	1986	1987–1991
Myrl H. Shoemaker		Democrat		1983-Aug. 1985
George V. Voinovich		Republican		1979-Nov. 1979
Richard F. Celeste		Democrat		1975-1979
John W. Brown		Republican		1963-1975
John W. Donahey		Democrat		1959-1963
Paul M. Herbert		Republican		1957-1959
John W. Brown		Republican		1953-1957
George D. Nye		Democrat		1949-1953
Paul M. Herbert		Republican		1947-1949
George D. Nye		Democrat		1945-1947
Paul M. Herbert		Republican		1939-1945
Paul P. Yoder		Democrat		1937-1939
Harold G. Mosier		Democrat		1935-1937
Charles Sawyer		Democrat		1933-1935
William G. Pickrel		Democrat		1931-1933
John T. Brown		Republican		1929-1931
George C. Braden		Republican		Nov. 1928-Jan. 1929
William G. Pickrel		Democrat		April 1928-Nov. 1928
Earl D. Bloom		Democrat		1927-April 1928
Charles H. Lewis		Republican		1925-1927
Earl D. Bloom		Democrat		1923-1925
Clarence J. Brown		Republican		1919-1923
Earl D. Bloom		Democrat		1917-1919
John H. Arnold		Republican		1915-1917
W.A. Greenlund		Democrat		1913-1915
Hugh L. Nichols		Democrat		1911-1913
Atlee Pomerene		Democrat		1911-1911
Francis W. Treadway		Republican		1909-1911
Andrew L. Harris		Republican		1906-1909
Warren G. Harding		Republican		1904-1906
Harry L. Gordon		Republican		1902-1904
Carl L. Nippert		Republican		1902-1902
John A. Caldwell		Republican		1900-1902
Asa W. Jones		Republican		1896-1900
Andrew L. Harris		Republican		1892-1896
William V. Marquis		Democrat		1890-1892
Elbert L. Lampson		Republican		1890-1890
William C. Lyon		Republican		1888-1890
Silas A. Conrad		Republican		1887-1888
Robert P. Kennedy		Republican		1886-1887
John G. Warwick		Democrat		1884-1886
Reese G. Richards		Republican		1882-1884
Andrew Hickenlooper		Republican		1880-1882
Jabez W. Fitch		Democrat		1878-1880
H.W. Curtiss		Republican		1877-1878
Thomas L. Young		Republican		1876-1877
Alphonso Hart		Democrat		1874-1876
Jacob Mueller		Republican		1872-1874
John C. Lee		Republican		1868-1872
Andrew R. McBurney		Republican		1866-1868
Charles Anderson		Republican		1864-1866
Benjamin Stanton		Republican		1862-1864
Robert C. Kirk		Republican		1860-1862
Martin Welker		Whig		1858-1860
Thomas H. Ford		Whig		1856-1858
James Myers		Democrat		1854-1856
William Medill		Democrat		1852-1854

=== Attorneys general of Ohio and candidates ===
Name	Life dates	Party	Candidate	Served
Marc Dann		Democrat	2006	2007–Present
Jim Petro	1948–Present	Republican	2002	2003– 2007
Betty Montgomery		Republican	1994 1998 2006	1995–2002
Lee Fisher	1951–Present	Democrat	1990 1994	1991–1995
Anthony J. Celebrezze Jr.	1941–2003	Democrat	1982 1986	1983–1991
William J. Brown		Democrat	1970 1974 1978	1971–1983
Paul W. Brown		Republican	1968	1969–1971
William B. Saxbe	1916–Present	Republican	1962	1963–1968
Mark McElroy		Democrat	1958	1959–1963
William B. Saxbe	1916–Present	Republican		1957–1959

=== State treasurers of Ohio and candidates ===
Name	Life dates	Party	Candidate	Served
Richard Cordray	1959–Present	Democrat	2006	2007–Present
Jennette Bradley		Republican	2004	2005–2007
Joseph T. Deters		Republican	1998	1999–2005
J. Kenneth Blackwell	1948–Present	Republican	1994	1994–1999

== Legislative ==
=== Majority whips of the Ohio Senate ===
Steve Austria, Republican, Senate District 10, Since 2005

=== Ohio state representatives and candidates ===
District	Name	Life dates	Party	Candidate	Served
1st District	Charles R. Blasdel	1971–Present	Republican	2000 2002 2004	2001–Present
2nd District	Jon M. Peterson		Republican		?-Present
3rd District	Jim Carmichael		Republican		?-Present
4th District	John R. Willamowski	1960–Present	Republican	1998 2000 2002 2004	1997–2006
5th District	Tim Schaffer		Republican		?-Present
6th District	Robert E. Latta		Republican		?-Present
12th District	Michael DeBose		Democrat	2000 2002 2004	2001–Present
13th District	Michael J. Skindell		Democrat		?-Present
15th District	Timothy J. DeGeeter	1969–Present	Democrat		?-Present
24th District	Geoffrey C. Smith	1943–Present	Republican		?-Present
25th District	Daniel Stewart		Democrat	2002 2004 2006	2003–Present
27th District	Joyce Beatty	1950–Present	Democrat		?-Present

== Judicial ==
=== Chief justices of the Ohio Supreme Court and candidates ===
(the office of chief justice was created in 1912)

Name	Party	Served
Hugh L. Nichols	Democrat	1913–1920
Carrington T. Marshall	Republican	1921–1932
Carl V. Weygandt	Democrat	1933–1962
Kingsley A. Taft	Republican	1963–1970
C. William O'Neill	Republican	1970–1978
Robert E. Leach	Republican	1978
Frank Celebrezze	Democrat	1978–1986
Thomas J. Moyer	Republican	March 2010
Eric Brown	Democratic	December 2010
Maureen O'Connor	Republican	Present

=== Judges of Ohio Courts of Appeal and candidates ===
Name	Life dates	Party	Candidate	Served	District
Gene Donofrio	1953–Present	Democrat	1992,1998, 2004	1993–Present	7th
Joseph J. Vukovich	1945–Present	Democrat	1996, 2002, 2008	1997–Present	7th
Cheryl L. Waite	1959–Present	Democrat	1996, 2002, 2008	1997–Present	7th
Mary DeGenaro	1961–Present	Republican	2000, 2006	2001–2018	7th
John R. Willamowski	1960–Present	Republican	2006	2007–Present	3rd
David J. Leland	1953–Present	Democrat	2022	2023–Present	10th

== See also ==
- List of presidents of the Ohio Senate
- List of speakers of the Ohio House of Representatives
