= 188th Division =

188th Division may refer to:

- 188th Division (People's Republic of China)
- 188th Mountain Division, Wehrmacht, Germany, previously the 188th Reserve Mountain Division
- 188th Rifle Division, Soviet Union

== See also ==
- List of military divisions by number
- 188th Brigade (disambiguation)
- 188th Regiment (disambiguation)
- 188th (disambiguation)
