= 188th Regiment =

188th Regiment may refer to:

- 188th Infantry Regiment (United States), U.S. Army regiment that served during WWII
- 188th New York Infantry Regiment, regiment in the Union Army during the American Civil War
- 188th Ohio Infantry Regiment, regiment in the Union Army during the American Civil War

== See also ==
- 188th Brigade (disambiguation)
