= 1944 United States Senate election in Ohio =

- November 7, 1944
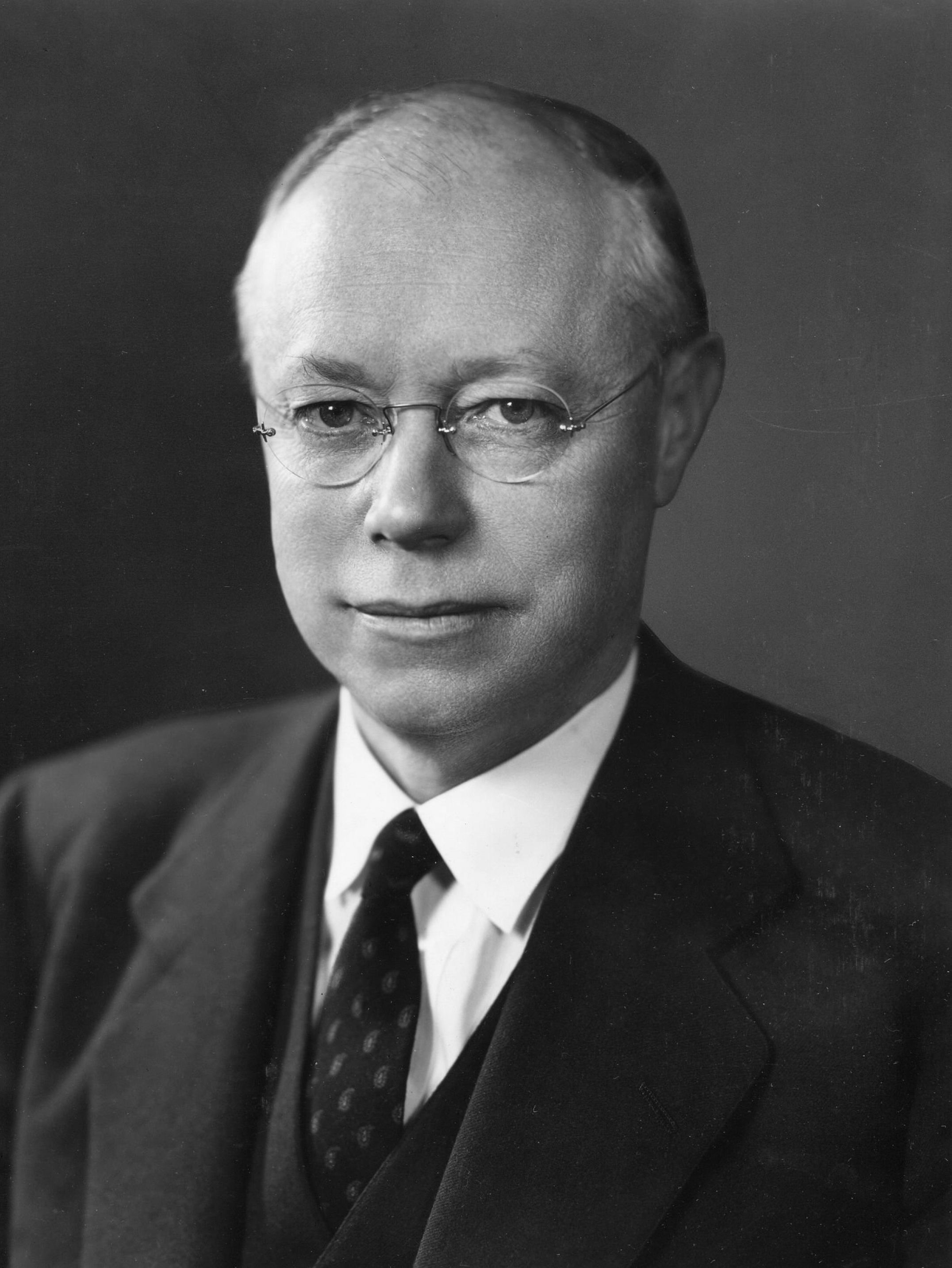

Nominee	Robert A. Taft	William Pickrel
Party	Republican	Democratic
Popular vote	1,500,609	1,482,610
Percentage	50.30%	49.70%
- County results Taft: 50–60% 60–70% 70–80% Pickrel: 50–60% 60–70%
U.S. senator before election
Robert A. Taft
Republican
Elected U.S. Senator
Robert A. Taft
Republican

The 1944 United States Senate election in Ohio took place on November 7, 1944. Incumbent Republican Senator Robert A. Taft, first elected in the Republican wave of 1938, was narrowly elected to a second term in office over Democratic former Lieutenant Governor William G. Pickrel, winning 71 of Ohio's 88 counties. Despite Pickrel winning the state's largest urban centers such as Cleveland, his margins there were overcome by Taft's strong showings in the rural areas and small towns. Nevertheless, at less than a point, Taft's victory was significantly smaller than his 7-point win in 1938.

== Background ==
Senator Taft unsuccessfully sought the Republican presidential nomination in 1940 and was a national leader of the party's conservative wing. He opposed American involvement in World War II before the Attack on Pearl Harbor, then he changed his mind and supported Congress' bipartisan effort to pass wartime appropriations for World War 2. In 1944, Taft decided to be a candidate for re-election before considering future presidential runs.

== Democratic primary ==
=== Candidates ===
- Marvin C. Harrison, former State Senator from Cleveland
- William G. Pickrel, attorney and former Lieutenant Governor of Ohio (1928, 1931–33)
- John Taylor

=== Results ===
1944 Democratic Senate primary
Party	Candidate	Votes	%
Democratic	William G. Pickrel	109,281	44.07%
Democratic	Marvin C. Harrison	77,019	31.06%
Democratic	John Taylor	61,647	24.86%
Total votes		247,947	100.00%

== General election ==
=== Results ===
1944 United States Senate election in Ohio
Party	Candidate	Votes	%	±%
Republican	Robert A. Taft (incumbent)	1,500,609	50.30%	▼3.32
Democratic	William G. Pickrel	1,482,610	49.70%	▲3.32
Total votes		2,983,219	100.00%	

==== By county ====
County	Robert Alphonso Taft Sr. Republican		William Gillespie Pickrel Democratic		Margin		Total votes cast
County	#	%	#	%	#	%	Total votes cast
Adams	5,419	57.73%	3,968	42.27%	1,451	15.46%	9,387
Allen	19,279	59.62%	13,057	40.39%	6,220	19.23	32,336
Ashland	8,097	55.95%	6,374	44.05%	1,723	11.9%	14,471
Ashtabula	16,809	57.04%	12,660	42.96%	4,149	14.08%	29,469
Athens	9,989	59.11%	6,911	40.89%	3,078	18.22%	16,900
Auglaize	8,121	62.03%	4,970	37.97%	3,151	22.06%	13,091
Belmont	15,344	41.09%	21,998	58.91%	-6,654	-17.82%	37,342
Brown	4,476	49.56%	4,556	50.44%	-80	-0.88%	9,032
Butler	20,199	42.95%	26,829	57.05%	-6,630	-14.1%	47,028
Carroll	4,826	64.27%	2,683	35.73%	2,143	28.54%	7,509
Champaign	7,524	62.27%	4,558	37.73%	2,966	24.54%	12,082
Clark	21,448	49.76%	21,651	50.24%	-203	-0.48%	43,099
Clermont	8,312	50.95%	8,002	49.05%	310	1.9%	16,314
Clinton	7,090	66.54%	3,565	33.46%	3,525	33.08%	10,615
Columbiana	19,795	54.16%	16,752	45.84%	3,043	8.32%	36,547
Coshocton	7,262	58.45%	5,163	41.55%	2,099	16.9%	12,425
Crawford	9,039	54.3%	7,606	45.7%	1,433	8.6%	16,645
Cuyahoga	199,422	40.27%	295,775	59.73%	-96,353	-19.46%	495,197
Darke	10,454	57.14%	7,842	42.86%	2,612	14.28%	18,296
Defiance	6,976	65.55%	3,667	34.45%	3,309	31.1%	10,643
Delaware	8,806	65.78%	4,582	34.22%	4,224	31.56%	13,388
Erie	10,079	58.14%	7,256	41.86%	2,823	16.28%	17,335
Fairfield	10,212	54.07%	8,676	45.93%	1,536	8.14%	18,888
Fayette	5,717	60.24%	3,774	39.76%	1,943	20.48%	9,491
Franklin	93,200	51.28%	88,553	48.72%	4,647	2.56%	181,753
Fulton	7,775	77.85%	2,212	22.15%	5,563	55.7%	9,987
Gallia	6,150	70.85%	2,530	29.15%	3,620	41.7%	8,680
Geauga	5,104	63.99%	2,872	36.01%	2,232	27.98%	7,976
Greene	9,425	55.91%	7,431	44.09%	1,994	11.82%	16,856
Guernsey	8,571	58.35%	6,117	41.65%	2,454	16.7%	14,688
Hamilton	149,226	52.0%	137,752	48.0%	11,474	4.0%	286,978
Hancock	12,587	65.83%	6,534	34.17%	6,053	31.66%	19,121
Hardin	8,318	61.75%	5,153	38.25%	3,165	23.5%	13,471
Harrison	4,968	60.81%	3,202	39.19%	1,766	21.62%	8,170
Henry	6,407	69.03%	2,875	30.97%	3,532	38.06%	9,282
Highland	7,592	58.75%	5,330	41.25%	2,262	17.5%	12,922
Hocking	4,233	54.48%	3,537	45.52%	696	8.96%	7,770
Holmes	2,618	49.83%	2,636	50.17%	-18	-0.34%	5,254
Huron	10,681	64.19%	5,959	35.81%	4,722	28.38%	16,640
Jackson	6,674	59.85%	4,478	40.15%	2,196	19.7%	11,152
Jefferson	15,812	41.76%	22,053	58.24%	-6,241	-16.48%	37,865
Knox	9,554	64.62%	5,231	35.38%	4,323	29.24%	14,785
Lake	13,086	54.74%	10,820	45.26%	2,266	9.48%	23,906
Lawrence	8,942	56.17%	6,978	43.83%	1,964	12.34%	15,920
Licking	15,756	56.1%	12,328	43.9%	3,428	12.2%	28,084
Logan	9,497	66.6%	4,763	33.4%	4,734	33.2%	14,260
Lorain	23,154	49.55%	23,578	50.45%	-424	-0.9%	46,732
Lucas	75,177	51.18%	71,720	48.82%	3,457	2.36%	146,897
Madison	5,501	63.35%	3,183	36.65%	2,318	26.7%	8,684
Mahoning	36,891	37.52%	61,442	62.48%	-24,551	-24.96%	98,333
Marion	11,252	55.75%	8,931	44.25%	2,321	11.5%	20,183
Medina	9,978	63.83%	5,654	36.17%	4,324	27.66%	15,632
Meigs	6,151	67.65%	2,941	32.35%	3,210	35.3%	9,092
Mercer	6,830	60.5%	4,459	39.5%	2,371	21.0%	11,289
Miami	14,641	60.19%	9,684	39.81%	4,957	20.38%	24,325
Monroe	3,228	51.58%	3,030	48.42%	198	3.16%	6,258
Montgomery	60,771	42.78%	81,272	57.22%	-20,501	-14.44%	142,043
Morgan	4,203	72.27%	1,613	27.73%	2,590	44.54%	5,816
Morrow	5,041	67.21%	2,459	32.79%	2,582	34.42	7,500
Muskingum	16,763	57.79%	12,243	42.21%	4,520	15.58%	29,006
Noble	3,711	62.96%	2,183	37.04%	1,528	25.92%	5,894
Ottawa	6,045	55.38%	4,870	44.62%	1,175	10.76%	10,915
Paulding	4,316	65.11%	2,313	34.89%	2,003	30.22%	6,629
Perry	6,828	59.22%	4,702	40.78%	2,126	18.44%	11,530
Pickaway	5,592	50.93%	5,387	49.07%	205	1.86%	10,979
Pike	2,865	40.82%	4,154	59.18%	-1,289	-18.36%	7,019
Portage	11,880	50.22%	11,775	49.78%	105	0.44%	23,655
Preble	6,380	57.25%	4,764	42.75%	1,616	14.5%	11,144
Putnam	6,781	66.12%	3,475	33.88%	3,306	32.24%	10,256
Richland	16,431	50.48%	16,117	49.52%	314	0.96%	32,548
Ross	11,060	53.44%	9,637	46.56%	1,423	6.88%	20,697
Sandusky	13,123	69.18%	5,847	30.82%	7,276	38.36%	18,970
Scioto	16,787	50.45%	16,487	49.55%	300	0.9%	33,274
Seneca	13,261	67.04%	6,519	32.96%	6,742	34.08%	19,780
Shelby	6,174	52.36%	5,617	47.64%	557	4.72%	11,791
Stark	48,952	46.18%	57,054	53.82%	-8,102	-7.64%	106,006
Summit	64,085	43.39%	83,596	56.61%	-19,511	-13.22%	147,681
Trumbull	24,602	43.36%	32,131	56.64%	-7,529	-13.28%	56,733
Tuscarawas	13,303	45.88%	15,694	54.12%	-2,391	-8.24	28,997
Union	6,492	70.15%	2,762	29.85%	3,730	40.3%	9,254
Van Wert	8,065	60.79%	5,202	39.21%	2,863	21.58%	13,267
Vinton	2,541	59.56%	1,725	40.44%	816	19.12%	4,266
Warren	8,248	59.55%	5,602	40.45%	2,646	19.1%	13,850
Washington	11,197	63.47%	6,445	36.53%	4,752	26.94%	17,642
Wayne	12,665	56.98%	9,564	43.02%	3,101	13.96	22,229
Williams	8,399	71.6%	3,332	28.4%	5,067	43.2%	11,731
Wood	15,473	66.02%	7,964	33.98%	7,509	32.04%	23,437
Wyandot	5,599	63.45%	3,225	36.55%	2,374	26.9%	8,824
Totals	1,500,609	50.30%	1,482,610	49.70%	17,999	0.6%	2,983,219

== See also ==
- 1944 United States Senate elections
