= 188th Ohio Infantry Regiment =

- Active: March 4, 1865, to September 21, 1865
- Country: United States
- Allegiance: Union
- Branch: Infantry

The 188th Ohio Infantry Regiment, sometimes 188th Ohio Volunteer Infantry (or 188th OVI) was an infantry regiment in the Union Army during the American Civil War.

== Service ==
The 188th Ohio Infantry was organized at Camp Chase in Columbus, Ohio, and mustered in for one year service on March 4, 1865, under the command of Colonel Jacob E. Taylor.

The regiment left Ohio for Nashville, Tennessee, March 4. It was attached to 1st Brigade, Defenses Nashville & Chattanooga Railroad, Department of the Cumberland, to April 1865. 1st Brigade, 1st Sub-District, District of Middle Tennessee, to September 1865. Performed provost duty at Murfreesboro, Tennessee, until May 1865. At Tullahoma, Tennessee, until July, and at Nashville, Tennessee, until September 1865.

The 188th Ohio Infantry mustered out of service September 21, 1865, at Nashville, Tennessee.

== Casualties ==
The regiment lost a total of 45 enlisted men during service, all due to disease.

== Commanders ==
- Colonel Jacob E. Taylor

== Notable members ==
- Private Martin Welker, Company I – Lieutenant Governor of Ohio, 1858–1860; U.S. Representative from Ohio, 1865–1871; judge for the United States District Court for the Northern District of Ohio, 1873–1889
- Physician John Maynard Wheaton – pioneer ornithologist, among the founders of the American Ornithologists Union, namesake of The Wheaton Club, a group for naturalists founded in 1921

== See also ==
- List of Ohio Civil War units
- Ohio in the Civil War
