= Augustus J. Ricks =

American judge (1843–1906)

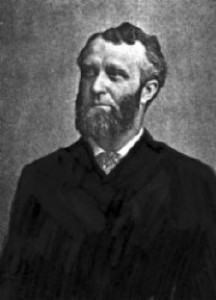

Judge of the United States District Court for the Northern District of Ohio
- In office July 1, 1889 – December 22, 1906
- Appointed by: Benjamin Harrison
- Preceded by: Martin Welker
- Succeeded by: Seat abolished

Personal details
- Born: Augustus J. Ricks; February 10, 1843 Brookfield, Ohio, U.S.
- Died: December 22, 1906 (aged 63) New York City, New York, U.S.
- Education: Kenyon College read law

Augustus J. Ricks (February 10, 1843 – December 22, 1906) was a United States district judge of the United States District Court for the Northern District of Ohio.

== Education and career ==
Born in Brookfield, Ohio, Ricks attended Kenyon College and read law to enter the bar in 1866. He was a Captain in the United States Army during the American Civil War from 1862 to 1865, serving with the 104th Ohio Infantry. He read law in the office of John Baxter. He was in private practice in Knoxville, Tennessee, where he had served during the war, from 1866 to 1870, as a partner of Baxter. He was an editor of the Knoxville Daily Chronicle from 1870 to 1875. He was in private practice in Massillon, Ohio from 1875 to 1878. He was a clerk of the United States Circuit Court for the Northern District of Ohio from 1878 to 1886. He was a Standing Master in Chancery for the United States District Court for the Northern District of Ohio from 1878 to 1889, and was a clerk of the United States District Court for the Northern District of Ohio from 1886 to 1889.

== Federal judicial service ==
Ricks received a recess appointment from President Benjamin Harrison on July 1, 1889, to a seat on the United States District Court for the Northern District of Ohio vacated by Judge Martin Welker. He was nominated to the same position by President Harrison on December 16, 1889. He was confirmed by the United States Senate on January 16, 1890, and received his commission the same day. His service terminated on December 22, 1906, due to his death in New York City, New York.

== Sources ==
Legal offices
Preceded by Martin Welker	Judge of the United States District Court for the Northern District of Ohio; 1889–1906	Succeeded by Seat abolished
