= 164th Ohio Infantry Regiment =

- Active: May 11, 1864 - August 27, 1864
- Country: United States
- Allegiance: Union
- Branch: Infantry
- Engagements: Battle of Fort Stevens

The 164th Ohio Infantry Regiment, sometimes 164th Ohio Volunteer Infantry (or 164th OVI) was an infantry regiment in the Union Army during the American Civil War.

== Service ==
The 164th Ohio Infantry was organized at Camp Cleveland in Cleveland, Ohio, and mustered in May 11, 1864, for 100 days service under the command of Colonel John Calvin Lee.

The regiment left Ohio for Washington, D.C., May 14 and was attached to 1st Brigade, DeRussy's Division, XXII Corps. It was assigned to duty on south side of the Potomac River as garrison at Fort C. F. Smith, Fort Strong, Fort Bennett, Fort Haggerty and other forts and batteries in the defenses of Washington, D.C. until August. Participated in the repulse of Early's attack on Washington July 11–12.

The 164th Ohio Infantry mustered out of service August 27, 1864.

== Ohio Militia ==
Over 35,000 Ohio Militiamen were federalized and organized into regiments for 100 days service in May 1864. Shipped to the Eastern Theater, they were designed to be placed in "safe" rear areas to protect railroads and supply points, thereby freeing regular troops for Lt. Gen. Ulysses S. Grant’s push on the Confederate capital of Richmond, Virginia. As events transpired, many units found themselves in combat, stationed in the path of Confederate Gen. Jubal Early’s veteran Army of the Valley during its famed Valley Campaigns of 1864. Ohio Guard units met the battle-tested foe head on and helped blunt the Confederate offensive thereby saving Washington, D.C. from capture. Ohio Militia units participated in the battles of Monacacy, Fort Stevens, Harpers Ferry, and in the siege of Petersburg.

== Casualties ==
The regiment lost 18 enlisted men during service, all due to disease.

== Commanders ==
- Colonel John Calvin Lee

== Notable members ==
- Pvt. John Peter Altgeld - 20th Governor of Illinois, 1893-1897

== See also ==
- List of Ohio Civil War units
- Ohio in the Civil War
