= Cheryl L. Waite =

American judge

Judge of the Ohio Seventh District Court of Appeals
- Incumbent
- Assumed office 1997

Personal details
- Party: Democratic Party
- Spouse: Edwin Romero
- Education: Youngstown State University; Cleveland State University College of Law
- Website: www.seventh.courts.state.oh.us/cheryl-l-waite

Cheryl L. Waite is an American lawyer who is the first female judge of the Ohio Seventh District Court of Appeals.

== Early life and education ==
Waite was born around 1959. She graduated from Youngstown State University and Cleveland State University College of Law. She was an assistant law director for Youngstown.

Judge Cheryl L. Waite was elected to the Seventh District Court of Appeals in 1996. She was the first woman to serve on this bench. Judge Waite has been reelected in 2002, 2008, 2014, and 2020. She faces term limits in 2026. She ran as a Democrat. She is married to Attorney Edwin Romero and has two children named Alexis and Evan.
