= 188th =

188th is the ordinal form of the number 188. 188th or One hundred eighty-eighth may also refer to:

- A fraction, 1/188, equal to one of 188 equal parts
- 188th Brigade (disambiguation)
- 188th Regiment (disambiguation)
- 188th Reserve Mountain Division (Wehrmacht)
- 188th Rescue Squadron, unit of the New Mexico Air National Guard
