= Robert A. Taft =

American politician (1889–1953)

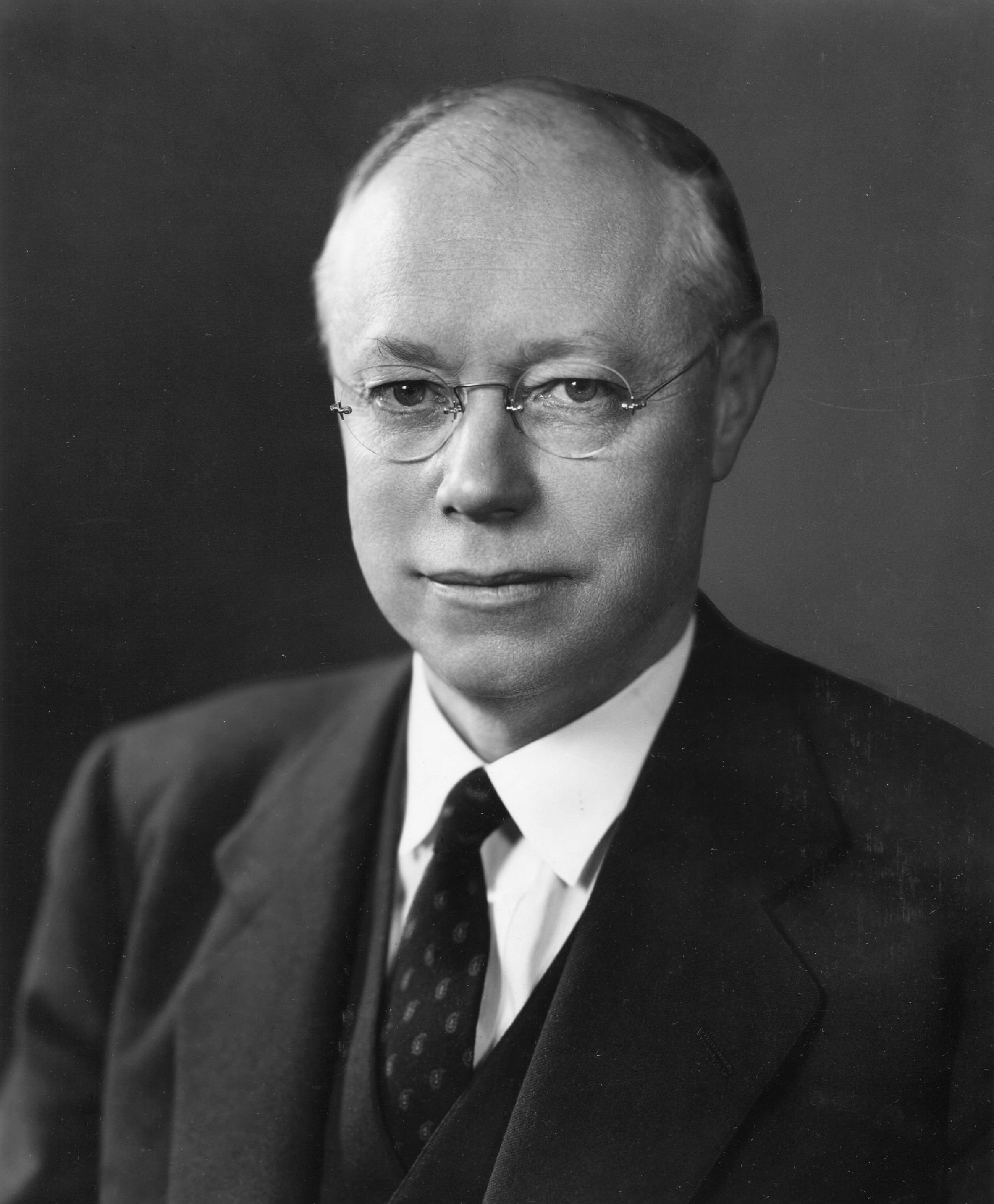
- Taft c. 1948

Senate Majority Leader
- In office January 3, 1953 – July 31, 1953
- Deputy: Leverett Saltonstall
- Preceded by: Ernest McFarland
- Succeeded by: William Knowland

United States Senator from Ohio
- In office January 3, 1939 – July 31, 1953
- Preceded by: Robert J. Bulkley
- Succeeded by: Thomas A. Burke
Other Senate positions
Chair of the Senate Republican Policy Committee
In office January 3, 1947 – January 3, 1953
Leader	Wallace H. White Jr. Kenneth S. Wherry; Styles Bridges
Preceded by	Position established
Succeeded by	William Knowland
Chair of the Senate Labor and Public Welfare Committee
In office January 3, 1947 – January 3, 1949
Preceded by	James E. Murray
Succeeded by	Elbert D. Thomas

Member of the Ohio Senate from the 1st district
- In office January 1, 1931 – January 1, 1933 Serving with Robert Espy and David Lorbach
- Succeeded by: Edward N. Waldvogel

79th Speaker of the Ohio House of Representatives
- In office January 15, 1926 – January 2, 1927
- Preceded by: Harry D. Silver
- Succeeded by: O. C. Gray

Member of the Ohio House of Representatives from Hamilton County
- In office January 1, 1921 – January 1, 1931

Personal details
- Born: Robert Alphonso Taft; September 8, 1889 Cincinnati, Ohio, U.S.
- Died: July 31, 1953 (aged 63) New York City, U.S.
- Party: Republican
- Spouse: Martha Wheaton Bowers (m. 1914)
- Children: 4, including William and Robert
- Parents: William Howard Taft; Helen Herron Taft
- Relatives: Taft family
- Education: Yale University (BA); Harvard University (LLB)
- Robert A. Taft's voice Taft introducing the National Vocarium; Recorded June 14, 1939

Robert Alphonso Taft Sr. (September 8, 1889 – July 31, 1953) was an American politician and lawyer who represented Ohio in the United States Senate from 1939 until his death in 1953. A member of the Republican Party, he briefly served as Senate majority leader and was a leader of the conservative coalition of Republicans and conservative Democrats who blocked expansion of the New Deal. Often referred to as "Mr. Republican", he co-sponsored the Taft–Hartley Act of 1947, which banned closed shops, created the framework of right-to-work states, and tightened other regulations on labor unions and practices.

Taft was a scion of the Taft political family; he was the elder son of William Howard Taft, the 27th president of the United States and 10th chief justice of the United States. Born in Cincinnati, Ohio, he pursued a legal career after graduating from Harvard Law School in 1913 and co-founded the law firm Taft Stettinius & Hollister with his brother Charles Phelps Taft II. Taft served in the Ohio House of Representatives from 1921 to 1931 and in the Ohio Senate from 1931 to 1933. Though he lost re-election in 1932, he remained a powerful force in state and local politics.

After winning election to the Senate in 1938 over incumbent Democrat Robert J. Bulkley, Taft repeatedly sought the Republican presidential nomination, often battling for control of the party with the moderate faction of Republicans led by Thomas E. Dewey. He also emerged as a prominent non-interventionist and opposed U.S. involvement in World War II prior to the 1941 Japanese attack on Pearl Harbor. Taft's non-interventionist stances damaged his 1940 candidacy, and the 1940 Republican National Convention nominated Wendell Willkie. Taft sought the presidency again in 1948, but he lost to Dewey at the 1948 Republican National Convention. He opposed the creation of NATO and criticized President Harry Truman's handling of the Korean War.

Taft again sought the presidential nomination a third time in 1952, and was widely viewed as the front-runner. However, Dewey and other moderates convinced General Dwight D. Eisenhower to enter the race, and Eisenhower narrowly prevailed at the 1952 Republican National Convention and went on to win the 1952 presidential election. Taft was elected Senate majority leader in 1953 but died of a cerebral hemorrhage while being treated for pancreatic cancer later that year. A 1957 Senate committee named Taft as one of America's five greatest senators, along with Henry Clay, Daniel Webster, John C. Calhoun, and Robert M. La Follette Sr.—portraits of the "famous five" are displayed in the Senate Reception Room.

== Family and education ==
Taft was born in Cincinnati, Ohio, on September 8, 1889, a product of one of America's most prominent political families. He was a grandson of Attorney General and Secretary of War Alphonso Taft, and the elder son of 27th President of the United States and 10th Chief Justice William Howard Taft and Helen Louise "Nellie" Herron. His younger brother Charles Phelps Taft II served as the mayor of Cincinnati and was the unsuccessful Republican candidate for Ohio Governor in 1952. As a boy Taft spent four years in the Philippines, where his father was Governor-General. He was first in his class at the Taft School (run by his uncle), at Yale College (1910), and at Harvard Law School (1913). He was a member of Psi Upsilon, his father's fraternity and Skull and Bones, and edited the Harvard Law Review. In 1913, Taft scored the highest in the state on the Ohio bar exam. He then practiced for four years with the firm of Maxwell and Ramsey (now Graydon Head & Ritchey LLP) in Cincinnati, his family's ancestral city. After a two-year stint in Washington working for the Food and Drug Administration, he returned to Cincinnati and opened his own law office. In 1924, he and his brother Charles helped form the law partnership Taft Stettinius & Hollister, with which Taft continued to be associated until his death and continues to carry his name today.

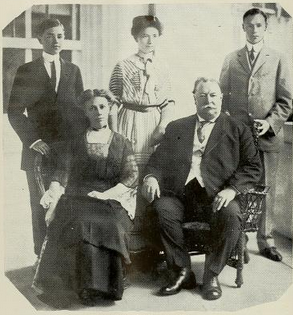
President-elect Taft and his family (1912)

On October 17, 1914, he married Martha Wheaton Bowers (1889–1958), daughter of Lloyd Wheaton Bowers and Louisa Bennett Wilson. Taft himself appeared taciturn and coldly intellectual, characteristics that were offset by his gregarious wife, who served the same role his mother had for his father, as a confidante and powerful asset to her husband's political career. In May 1950, Martha suffered a severe stroke that left her an invalid, leaving her unable to walk, unable to take care of herself, and reliant upon her husband, children, and nurses for support. A biographer called his wife's stroke "the deepest personal blow of [Taft's] life ... there was no denying that he suffered." Following her stroke, Taft faithfully assisted his wife, called her every night when he was away on business, read stories to her at night when he was at home, "pushed her about in her wheelchair, lifted her in and out of cars ... tenderly did his best to make her feel comfortable and happy, and helped feed and take care of her at public functions" – facts which, his admirers noted, belied his public image as a cold and uncaring person.

They had four sons:

- William Howard Taft III (1915–1991), who became ambassador to Ireland
- Robert Alphonso Taft Jr. (1917–1993), who was also elected to the U.S. Senate
- Lloyd Bowers Taft (1923–1985), who worked as an investment banker in Cincinnati,
- Horace Dwight Taft (1925–1983), who became a professor of physics and dean at Yale.

Three of Robert and Martha's grandchildren are Robert Alphonso "Bob" Taft III (born 1942), Governor of Ohio from 1999 to 2007, William Howard Taft IV (born 1945), Deputy Secretary of Defense from 1984 to 1989, and Patricia Taft (born 1984), charter board member of the National First Ladies Day Commission and board member of the Society of Presidential Descendants.

In 1917, Taft and his wife bought a 46-acre (19-hectare) farm in Indian Hill, a well-to-do suburb of Cincinnati. Called Sky Farm, it would serve as Taft's primary residence for the rest of his life. The Tafts gradually made extensive renovations that turned the small farmhouse into a sixteen-room mansion. On the farm Taft enjoyed growing strawberries, asparagus, and potatoes for profit. During the summer, Taft often vacationed with his wife and children at the Taft family's summer home at Murray Bay, in Quebec, Canada. Although he was nominally a member of the Episcopal church, his biographer James Patterson noted that Taft's "religious inclinations were weak" and that he was a "Sunday morning golfer, not a church-going Episcopalian". When reporters asked his wife Martha what church he attended, she jokingly replied, "I'd have to say the Burning Tree", an exclusive country club and golf course in suburban Washington.

== Early public career ==
When the United States entered World War I in April 1917, Taft attempted to join the army but was rejected due to his poor eyesight. Instead, he joined the legal staff of the Food and Drug Administration where he met Herbert Hoover, who became his idol. In 1918 and 1919, he was in Paris as legal adviser for the American Relief Administration, Hoover's agency to distribute food to wartorn Europe. He came to distrust governmental bureaucracy as inefficient and detrimental to the rights of the individual, a principle he promoted throughout his career. He urged membership in the League of Nations but generally distrusted European politicians. He endorsed the idea of a powerful world court to enforce international law, but no such idealized court ever existed during his lifetime. He returned to Cincinnati in late 1919, promoted Hoover for president in 1920, and opened a law firm with his brother, Charles Taft.

In 1920 he was elected to the Ohio House of Representatives, where he served as Republican floor leader and was Speaker of the House from January 1926 to January 1927. In 1930, he was elected to the Ohio Senate, but was defeated for re-election in 1932; it would be the only general election defeat of his career. He was an outspoken opponent of the Ku Klux Klan, and he did not support prohibition. In 1925, he voted against a bill, sponsored by Ohio state representatives who were members of the Ku Klux Klan, to outlaw dancing on Sundays, and he led the fight against a Klan-sponsored bill requiring all Ohio public school teachers to read at least ten verses of the Bible each day in class. In his speech opposing the bill, Taft stated that religion should be taught in churches, not public schools, and while the Bible was great literature, "in it religion overshadows all else." The bill passed the legislature over the opposition of Taft and his allies, but it was later vetoed by Ohio's governor.

Taft's period of service in the Ohio state legislature was most notable for his efforts to reform and modernize the state's antiquated tax laws. Throughout the 1920s and 1930s, Taft was a powerful figure in local and state political and legal circles, and he was known as a loyal Republican who never threatened to bolt the party. He confessed in 1922 that "while I have no difficulty talking, I don't know how to do any of the eloquence business which makes for enthusiasm or applause." A lackluster speaker who did not mix well or glad-hand supporters, Taft was still a tireless worker with a broad range of policy and political interests. His total grasp of the complex details of every issue impressed reporters and politicians. Democrats joked that "Taft has the best mind in Washington, until he makes it up." Taft's loyalty to the conservative politicians who controlled Ohio's Republican Party had a price, as it often caused conflict with his younger brother, Charles, who as a local politician in Cincinnati had gained a reputation as a party maverick and liberal; however, despite their occasional policy disagreements, Charles loyally supported all three of his brother's presidential bids.

== Senate career ==
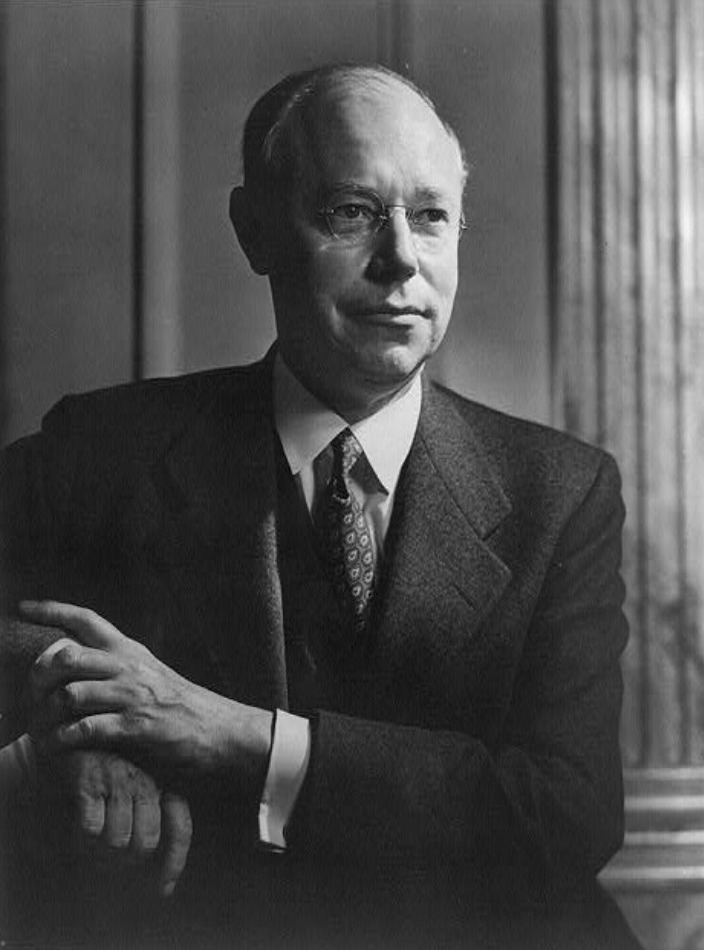
Taft during his Senate tenure, from the US Senate Historical Office collection

Taft was elected to the first of his three terms as US senator in 1938. He first defeated Ohio Supreme Court justice Arthur H. Day in the Republican primary, and then defeated the Democratic incumbent, Robert Bulkley, in the general election. Taft engaged Bulkley in several debates and was generally regarded as the winner. He struggled in the earlier debates but later came out on top through assistance from his wife, Martha, who would be regarded as the most valuable asset in his campaign. As a result, Taft gained the upper hand against Bulkley, who had earlier been regarded as the frontrunner in the race, and won the election by nearly 171,000 votes, or 53.6% of the total vote. During his first two years as a Senator, the Tafts rented a home in Washington, but in 1941 they purchased a brick Victorian home, built in the 1880s, in the city's Georgetown neighborhood. The home – despite lacking "the grace and amenities of Sky Farm", their home in Ohio – remained their Washington residence until Taft's death in 1953.

=== Political positions ===
Cooperating with Conservative Democrats, he led the conservative coalition that opposed the New Deal. The Republican gains in the 1938 elections, combined with the creation of the conservative coalition, had stopped the expansion of the New Deal. However, Taft saw his mission as not only stopping the growth of the New Deal but also eliminating many of its government programs.

During his first term in the Senate, Taft criticized what he believed was the inefficiency and waste of many New Deal programs and of the need to let private enterprise and businesses restore the nation's economy instead of relying upon government programs to end the Great Depression. He condemned the New Deal as socialist and attacked deficit spending, high farm subsidies, governmental bureaucracy, the National Labor Relations Board, and nationalized health insurance. However, he did not always follow the ideology of the conservative coalition, supporting Social Security, subsidized loans for farmers and homeowners, the Reconstruction Finance Corporation, public works projects, public housing, workers' right to strike and federal aid to public education, having sponsored the Housing Act of 1949. As noted by Ralph Nader, Taft was also willing to revise the Taft-Hartley Act in order to make it more balanced and more favorable towards labor unions. Whereas some fellow liberals thought of Taft as a stooge for big business, Burton K. Wheeler described Taft as an "honest conservative", believing that he "would not be pushed around by Wall Street or the unintelligent reactionaries", and endorsed his 1948 presidential campaign. Taft was also supportive of public works projects "when private activity falls off".

Taft set forward a conservative domestic program that promoted limited government spending, a balanced federal budget, low taxes, pro-business policies to spur economic growth, a limited number of social welfare programs (such as Social Security, a minimum wage, public housing and federal aid to public education), and an adequate national defense focused on strengthening the Navy and Air Force. In foreign policy, he advocated noninvolvement in European wars and military alliances. He also strongly opposed the military draft on the principle that it limited a young man's freedom of choice. Various historians have described Taft, in terms of political philosophy, as a libertarian; he opposed nearly all forms of governmental interference in both the national economy and in the private lives of citizens. Republican Party historian Geoffrey Kabaservice has described Taft as a politician who opposed bigness in labor, business and government. President Eisenhower found Taft "extraordinarily leftish" in some domestic positions.

On Independence Day 1945, Taft announced his intention to combat the Bretton Woods monetary agreement on the Senate floor, adding that his battle consisted of trying to add amendments to the bill through the Senate committee and that he wanted the agreement postponed until conditions had stabilized.

In January 1946, after President Truman delivered a radio address calling for Americans to pressure their representatives in Congress for legislation the president called "vital", Taft asserted that Truman had chosen to follow the economic views of the CIO-PAC and left the Democratic Party split and his legislative recommendations stalled despite the Democratic majority in Congress.

=== Opposition to World War II ===
Taft's greatest prominence during his first term came not from his fight against the New Deal but rather from his vigorous opposition to US involvement in the Second World War. A staunch non-interventionist, Taft believed that America should avoid any involvement in European or Asian wars and concentrate instead on solving its domestic problems. He believed that a strong military, combined with the natural geographic protection of the Atlantic and Pacific Oceans, would be adequate to protect America even if Germany overran all of Europe. Between the outbreak of war in September 1939, and the Japanese attack on Pearl Harbor in December 1941, Taft opposed nearly all attempts to aid countries fighting Germany. That brought him strong criticism from many liberal Republicans, such as 1940 presidential nominee Wendell Willkie, who felt that America could best protect itself by supporting the British and their allies. Although Taft fully supported the American war effort after Pearl Harbor, he continued to harbor a deep suspicion of American involvement in postwar military alliances, including the North Atlantic Treaty Organization. Taft was the only representative to speak in opposition to Japanese-American internment.

=== 1944 re-election ===
In 1944 Taft was nearly defeated in his bid for a second term in the Senate. His Democratic opponent, former Ohio lieutenant governor William G. Pickrel, received major support from Ohio's labor unions and internationalists, and lost by fewer than 18,000 votes out of nearly three million cast, or a margin of less than one percent. Taft lost Cleveland, the state's largest city, by 96,000 votes, and he trailed in most of Ohio's largest urban areas, but he ran strong in the state's rural regions and small towns, carried 71 of Ohio's 88 counties, and so avoided defeat. His near-defeat in 1944 "was ever to confound Taft's insistence that he was a potent vote getter", and played a role in his failure to win the Republican presidential nomination in 1948. Following his re-election, Taft became chairman of the Senate Republican Conference in 1944.

=== United Nations ===
In 1945, Taft was among the seven senators who opposed full United States entry into the United Nations.

=== Britain ===
In March 1946, after the Truman administration pushed for granting Britain a loan of $3.75 billion, Taft advocated for Britain receiving an "outright gift" in place of the loan and said it "would cause irritation" between the latter country and the United States for the next 50 years during his questioning of Undersecretary of State Dean Acheson as part of the Senate Banking committee. Taft asserted that the State Department had acted with "complete secrecy" in negotiating the loan, as no member of Congress had been consulted, and that the proposal would face opposition in Congress for this reason. Taft proposed that Britain could receive the funds it would have had from the loan by adding the US gift of $1 billion with an advance from the International Bank and the International Fund.

=== Education ===
In March 1946, Taft joined senators Lister Hill and Elbert Thomas in introducing a version of the Hill-Thomas Federal Aid to Education bill. In 1948, Taft sponsored an education aid bill providing the poorest states with the most money. Despite Senate approval, the bill was rejected in the House.

=== Condemnation of Nuremberg Trials ===
Taft condemned the postwar Nuremberg Trials as victor's justice under ex post facto laws, in which the people who won the war were the prosecutors, the judges, and the alleged victims, all at the same time. Taft condemned the trials as a violation of the most basic principles of American justice and internationally accepted standards in favor of a politicized version of justice in which court proceedings became an excuse for vengeance against the defeated.

I question whether the hanging of those, who, however despicable, were the leaders of the German people, will ever discourage the making of aggressive war, for no one makes aggressive war unless he expects to win. About this whole judgment there is the spirit of vengeance, and vengeance is seldom justice. The hanging of the eleven men convicted will be a blot on the American record, which we shall long regret.

His opposition to the trials was criticized by Republicans and Democrats alike, and it is sometimes given as a reason for his failure to secure the Republican nomination for president. Other observers, such as Senator John F. Kennedy (in Profiles in Courage), applauded Taft's principled stand even in the face of great bipartisan criticism.

=== Health care ===
Despite opposing President Harry Truman's proposal for a comprehensive, national health insurance plan, Taft expressed support for medical aid for poor and low-income people, and in 1947, he proposed a program in which states would receive federal aid from the government in order to provide health care for poor and low-income people. A similar program in Medicaid would eventually be signed into law by President Lyndon B. Johnson in 1965.

In his support of means-tested public health insurance programs, Taft said in 1949: "It has always been assumed in this country that those able to pay for medical care would buy their own medical service, just as under any system, except a socialistic system, they buy their own food, their own housing, their own clothing, and their own automobiles... Undoubtedly, in that system there are gaps... and we have a very definite interest in trying to fill the gaps."

=== 1947 Taft–Hartley Labor Act ===
When the Republicans took control of Congress in 1947, he focused on labor-management relations as Chair of the Senate Labor Committee. Decrying the effect of the Wagner Act in tilting the balance toward labor unions, he wrote the 1947 Taft–Hartley Act, which remains the basic labor law. It bans "unfair" union practices, outlaws closed shops, and authorizes the President to seek federal court injunctions to impose an 80-day cooling-off period if a strike threatened the national interest. Taft displayed all of his parliamentary skills in getting the bill through Congress. When President Harry Truman vetoed it, Taft then convinced both houses of Congress to override the veto.

By early 1949, Elbert Thomas sponsored legislation sent to Congress by the Truman administration that would repeal the Taft–Hartley Act. Taft predicted that a majority of the Taft–Hartley Act would remain in law and began a week-long period of "one hard-pounding argument after another" defending the legislation. Later that month, senators Wayne Morse and Irving Ives indicated interest in offering a new labor bill that would remove the section of the Taft–Hartley Act allowing the government to have 80-day injunctions to halt critical strikes, the two publicly stating their hope that Taft would back the legislation. In May, amid the Truman administration's attempts to repeal the Taft–Hartley Act through its own legislation, Taft joined fellow Republicans Howard Alexander Smith and Forrest C. Donnell in introducing legislation that Taft promoted as retaining "the best features of the Taft–Hartley law". In June, ahead of the Senate opening debate on labor legislation, Taft stated there would be a battle fought between his amended Taft–Hartley Act and President Truman's proposal for a repeal and confirmed to reporters he was "not contemplating any new concessions". When the Senate resumed debate on June 8, Taft responded to Elbert D. Thomas in a speech charging Democratic members of the Senate Labor Committee with playing partisan politics in their handling of the Truman administration's bill to repeal the Taft–Hartley Act.

=== Second term ===
From 1947 to 1949, when the Republicans controlled the Senate for the first time since 1931, Taft was his party's leading voice in domestic policy. He was reluctant to support farm subsidies, a position that hurt the GOP in rural areas (especially in the Midwest) in the 1948 elections. Taft engineered the passage of the Housing Act of 1949, which funded slum clearance and the construction of 810,000 units of low-income housing over a period of six years. It was one of the few Fair Deal proposals of Truman that he liked. In March 1947, Taft charged Senate Democrats with deliberately stalling legislation and threatened to continually request sessions for the purpose of forwarding the Republican legislative program. In January 1948, Taft delivered a speech responding to President Truman's State of the Union address in which he charged the legislative proposals of the Truman administration with leading the United States to bankruptcy and totalitarianism while pledging the Republican-controlled Congress would not allow them to pass, saying they followed the principle of the New Deal in "promising the people something for nothing." Taft added that the Republicans intended to introduce their own program to reduce expenses and cut both taxes and the tax burden. In turn, Truman Democrats labelled the GOP-controlled 80th congress the "Do Nothing Congress", and accused Taft and Republicans legislators of engaging in obstructionism for purely political purposes.

In February 1949, after losing control of the senate to Democrats in the 1948 election, Taft announced the Republican Party policy committee had agreed to support a motion by California senator William Knowland aimed at changing the rules of curbing filibusters. In March 1949, the Senate Labor Committee approved the Truman administration's labor bill without changing a comma and while overriding Republican protests; Taft responded that the act was "the most heavy-handed procedure" he had seen since being in the Senate. That year, Taft supported a health program calling for federal outlays of $1.25 billion during the period of the next five years and stated no major health legislation would be passed during the current congressional session. In July 1950, as Senate tax writers gathered in Washington for the first time to discuss the tax reduction voted on by the House, Taft publicly admitted his lack of enthusiasm with a provision calling for the payment of corporate taxes to be sped up within the next five years. Taft stated that Republicans would support a general tax increase during the fall. The same month, during an effort by Republicans to suppress the report by Senate Democrats attacking the charges of Senator Joseph McCarthy, Taft joined Kenneth S. Wherry in predicting an effort to send the majority report back to the committee with an order calling for a bipartisan investigation of the loyalty program of the federal government.

In foreign policy, he was non-interventionist and did not see Stalin's Soviet Union as a major threat. However, he called David Lilienthal "soft on the subject of Communism". The true danger, he believed, was big government and runaway spending. He supported the Truman Doctrine and reluctantly approved the Marshall Plan but opposed NATO, as unnecessary and provocative to the Soviets. Consequently, in July 1949, Taft was one of thirteen senators to vote against the ratification of the NATO pact. However, Taft objected not to the treaty's objectives, but to its form and especially to its rearmament aspects. Taft was strongly for the principle of guaranteeing the integrity of Western Europe. He took the lead among Republicans in condemning Truman's handling of the Korean War and questioning the constitutionality of the war itself: "My conclusion, therefore, is that in the case of Korea, where a war was already under way, we had no right to send troops to a nation, with whom we had no treaty, to defend it against attack by another nation, no matter how unprincipled that aggression might be, unless the whole matter was submitted to Congress and a declaration of war or some other direct authority obtained." In April 1949, during a debate on renewal of the Marshall Plan bill, Taft stated the US could see either a tax increase or budget deficit in the event that foreign aid and other government spending were not reduced. Later that month, a compromise European Recovery Program passed both the House and Senate, within minutes of each other. Taft stated he was hopeful the Appropriations Committees would reduce the cash total by ten percent and led an unsuccessful attempt to trim the bill by the aforementioned amount. In June 1949, Taft indicated his support for reducing funding for the European Recovery Program, saying the Economic Corporation Administration could stand a 10 percent cut in the funding approved by the House. In August 1950, Taft stated the United States had invited the attack in Korea, adding that the real problem was whether the United States was going to "outfit the armed forces" or build up American forces in anticipation of a war against Russia in the following two years, and an all-out rearming of the US would lead to World War III.

==== Support of Israel ====
Taft was a leading supporter of the new state of Israel, called for an end to the arms embargo to the Middle East, and supported arms shipments and other military aid to the new country. According to historian Brian Kennedy:

Taft's actions towards Palestine seemed to violate many of his foremost principles. Despite being one of the foremost isolationists in the nation, Taft proposed the United States serve as the primary arbiter in the Middle East. Although publicly stating that the United States had no right to dictate policy towards Great Britain in regards to India, he consistently sought to influence British policy in Palestine. Meanwhile, even as he criticized the efforts to grant foreign aid to allied nations in Europe, Taft proposed $150 million in aid be given to Israel. Moreover, at a time when he was running against Truman for the presidency, and while he engaged in extremely contentious and partisan political struggles with the President, Taft surprisingly seemed to agree with the President on the issue of Israel.

=== 1950 re-election ===
In 1950, Taft ran a more effective campaign for re-election to the Senate. Wooing factory workers, he visited 334 industrial plants and gave 873 speeches. He won a third term by 431,184 votes, the second largest victory margin in Ohio Senate election history until then. He benefited from a weak Democratic opponent – one observer reportedly said of "Jumping Joe" Ferguson, the State Auditor, "If the Democrats want to win, they should send Ferguson on a mission abroad" – but more importantly, Ohio's unions failed to effectively use the Taft–Hartley Act, which they denounced as a "slave labor law", against him. Additionally, Democratic Governor Frank Lausche did not endorse Ferguson and, according to journalist Samuel Lubell, almost openly supported Taft. In a post-election survey of voters, Lubell found that the overly aggressive, labor-backed anti-Taft campaign angered some Democrats. Even many union members reportedly voted Republican to express their opposition to local union leaders, to support Taft–Hartley's ban on the closed shop, or to prevent, as one told Lubell, "the Socialists from taking over the Democratic party."

By the start of his third Senate term, Taft had been given the nickname "Mr. Republican." He was the chief congressional ideologue and spokesman for the conservatism of the Republican Party and the acknowledged national leader of its conservative faction.

In a January 6, 1951 speech on the Senate floor, Taft criticized the Truman administration for plans to defend Western Europe with the U.S. Army. Taft said the NATO treaty did not commit the U.S. to send an American Army to Europe and wanted no American troops there at this time, being in favor instead of reliance on long-distance air and sea superiority to deter the Russians. Taft supported Congress reducing the number of American soldiers that could be dispatched to assist with the defenses of Western Europe, and accused the Truman administration of concealing the number of American troops and soldiers from other nations that would be furnished in the International Defense Army from Congress as well as the American people and advocated for the United States to supply a single division for every nine put up by European nations. In January 1953, Taft stated that the Truman administration's handling of foreign policy had left the incoming Eisenhower "with the most dangerous foreign problem this country has ever faced."

In August 1951, after President Truman delivered an address criticizing those "trying to create fear and suspicion among us by the use of slander, unproved accusations, and just plain lies", Taft told a reporter that he considered Truman hysterical and called for him to refer to a specific remark that was both false and alleged of him. That month, Taft announced his support for an Air Force increase but opposition to similar boosts for either the Army or Navy, telling a reporter of his concerns that military leaders would ask Congress for appropriations later in the year and that additional increases for other branches would retain deficits he did not believe the US could stand. In December, Taft delivered an address to the American Medical Association, asserting the federal government as attempting to take over all welfare programs through a scheme and stated that doctors were justified in their opposition as Socialists made moves to enact a federal system of socialized medicine. On January 31, 1953, Taft indicated the Eisenhower administration would allow the death of price controls on April 30 and voiced his opposition to the "legal recognition to the principle of controls".

== Presidential ambitions ==
=== Distrust by Old Right ===
While outsiders thought Taft was the epitome of conservative Republicanism, inside the party, he was repeatedly criticized by hardliners alarmed by his sponsorship of New Deal-like programs, especially federal housing for the poor. The real estate lobby was especially fearful about public housing. Senator Kenneth S. Wherry discerned a "touch of socialism" in Taft, and his Ohio colleague, Senator John Bricker, speculated that perhaps the "socialists have gotten to Bob Taft." The distrust on the right hurt Taft's 1948 presidential ambitions.

=== 1940 and 1944 ===
Taft first sought the Republican presidential nomination in 1940 but lost to Wendell Willkie. Taft was regarded as a strong contender, but his outspoken support of a non-interventionist foreign policy, and his opposition to the New Deal in domestic policy led many liberal Republicans to reject his candidacy. At the 1940 Republican Convention, Willkie, once a Democrat, and a corporate executive who had never run for political office, came from behind to beat Taft and several other candidates for the nomination. That year, Taft first clashed with Thomas E. Dewey, then a New York district attorney, who had become nationally famous for successfully prosecuting several prominent organized-crime figures, especially New York mob boss "Lucky" Luciano. Taft felt that Dewey was not conservative or consistent enough in his principles for the Republican Party: "Tom Dewey has no real courage to stand up against the crowd that wants to smear any Republican who takes a forthright position against the New Deal ... there is only one way to beat the New Deal, and that is head on. You can't outdeal them." In other letters, Taft described Dewey as "very arrogant and bossy" and worried that "advisers will talk Dewey into too much internationalism ... he comes from New York and sees the group opinions there as a lot more important than they are."

In the 1944 presidential campaign Taft was not a candidate. He supported Governor John W. Bricker of Ohio, a fellow conservative, for the nomination. However, Bricker was defeated by Dewey, who had become the governor of New York in 1943. Dewey named Bricker as his running mate; the ticket would go on to lose to Roosevelt in the general election.

=== 1948 and 1952 ===
In 1948, Taft made a second try for the nomination but again was defeated by his archrival, Dewey, who led the GOP's moderate/liberal wing. In the 1948 United States presidential election, Dewey was defeated by the Democratic presidential candidate, Harry S. Truman.

In August 1951, during a news conference, President Truman said Taft was his choice for the Republican nomination in the following year's presidential election, Taft responding by saying that he would let others comment on the remark. In January 1952, Taft stated those seeking the drafting of General Dwight Eisenhower had made the argument he could not win the general election and that he did not understand this perspective as the same argument was being made of Eisenhower's candidacy by his manager David S. Ingalls. On March 20, Taft announced his withdrawal from the New Jersey Republican primary, citing the endorsement of Eisenhower by Governor of New Jersey Alfred Driscoll and insisting the endorsement was part of a move by Driscoll to corrupt the primary's intent.

Taft sought to reach out to southern Democratic voters in his 1952 campaign. It was his third and final try for the nomination; it also proved to be his strongest effort. At the Republican State Convention in Little Rock, he declared:

I believe a Republican could carry a number of southern states if he conducts the right kind of campaign. ... Whether we win or lose in the South, we cannot afford to ignore public opinion in the southern states, because it influences national public opinion, and that opinion finally decides the election. ... It is said that southern Democrats will not vote for a Republican candidate. They have frequently done so. They did so in Little Rock last November [1951] when they elected Pratt Remmel mayor. I refuse to admit that if the issues are clearly presented, the southern voters will not vote on the basis of principle. ...

Taft had the solid backing of the party's conservative wing. Former US representative Howard Buffett of Nebraska (father of billionaire Warren Buffett) served as one of his campaign managers. With Dewey no longer an active candidate, many political pundits regarded Taft as the frontrunner. However, the race changed when Dewey and other moderates were able to convince Dwight D. Eisenhower, the most popular general of World War II, to run for the nomination. Eisenhower ran because of his fear that Taft's non-interventionist views in foreign policy, especially his opposition to NATO, might benefit the Soviet Union in the Cold War.

The fight between Taft and Eisenhower for the nomination was one of the closest and most bitter in American political history. When the Republican Convention opened in Chicago in July 1952, Taft and Eisenhower were neck-and-neck in delegate votes. On the convention's first day, Eisenhower's managers complained that Taft's forces had unfairly denied Eisenhower supporters delegate slots in several Southern states, including Texas, where the state chairman, Orville Bullington, was committed to Taft. The Eisenhower partisans proposed to remove pro-Taft delegates in these states and replace them with pro-Eisenhower delegates; they called their proposal "Fair Play." Although Taft angrily denied having stolen any delegate votes, the convention voted to support Fair Play 658 to 548, and the Texans voted 33–5 for Eisenhower as a result. In addition, several uncommitted state delegations, such as Michigan and Pennsylvania, agreed to support Eisenhower.

The addition of the uncommitted state delegations, combined with Taft's loss of many Southern delegates by the Fair Play proposal, decided the nomination in Eisenhower's favor. Despite his bitterness at his narrow defeat and his belief that he had been unfairly ambushed by the Eisenhower forces (including Dewey), Taft issued a brief statement after the convention conveying his congratulations and support to Eisenhower. Thereafter, however, he brooded in silence at his summer home in Quebec, complaining, "Every Republican candidate for President since 1936 has been nominated by the Chase National Bank." As the weeks passed, Eisenhower's aides worried that Taft and his supporters would sit on their hands during the campaign and that as a result Eisenhower might lose the election. In September 1952, Taft finally agreed to meet with Eisenhower, at Morningside Heights in New York City. There, to gain Taft's support, Eisenhower promised that he would take no reprisals against Taft partisans, would cut federal spending, and would fight "creeping socialism in every domestic field." In fact, Eisenhower and Taft agreed on most domestic issues; their disagreements were primarily in foreign policy.

Eisenhower firmly believed in NATO and was committed to the US support of anticommunism in the Cold War.

== Senate majority leader ==
Following Eisenhower's election and the Republican takeover of Congress, Taft served as Senate majority leader in 1953, and he strongly supported Eisenhower's domestic proposals. He worked hard to assist the inexperienced new officials of the administration. He even tried, with little success, to curb the excesses of red-baiting US senator Joseph McCarthy. By April, Eisenhower and Taft were friends and golfing companions, and Taft was praising his former adversary. Defeat in 1952, it seemed, had softened Taft. No longer burdened by presidential ambitions, he had become less partisan, less abrasive, and more conciliatory; he was now widely regarded as the most powerful man in Congress.

On May 26, 1953, Taft delivered his final speech, in which he presciently warned of the dangers of America's emerging Cold War foreign policy, specifically against US military involvement in Southeast Asia, which would later become the Vietnam War:

I have never felt that we should send American soldiers to the Continent of Asia, which, of course, included China proper and Indo-China, simply because we are so outnumbered in fighting a land war on the Continent of Asia that it would bring about complete exhaustion even if we were able to win. ... So today, as since 1947 in Europe and 1950 in Asia, we are really trying to arm the world against Communist Russia, or at least furnish all the assistance which can be of use to them in opposing Communism. Is this policy of uniting the free world against Communism in time of peace going to be a practical long-term policy? I have always been a skeptic on the subject of the military practicability of NATO. ... I have always felt that we should not attempt to fight Russia on the ground on the Continent of Europe any more than we should attempt to fight China on the Continent of Asia.

== Death and legacy ==
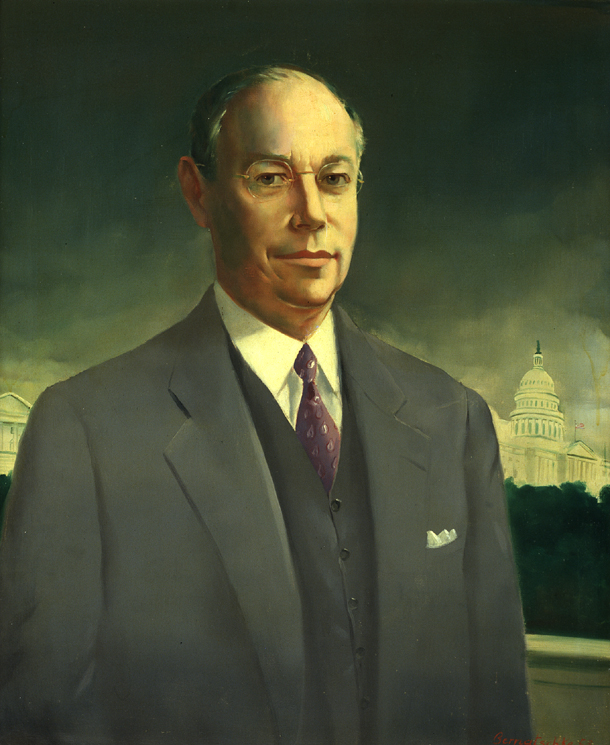
Rudolf Anton Bernatschke's portrait of Taft standing in front of what would later become the Frances Perkins Department of Labor Building on Constitution Avenue

In April 1953, Taft checked into Walter Reed Army Medical Center. He had been suffering from pain in his hips for some time and had recently played a round of golf with President Eisenhower, which he was barely able to finish. Doctors there put the Senator through a battery of tests, but they were not conclusive; it was suspected that Taft may have been suffering from arthritis or perhaps had a tumor somewhere in his lower extremities.

On May 26, Taft returned to Cincinnati where he underwent another round of medical testing at Holmes Hospital. Biopsies were done on several nodules on his head and abdomen, which came back as malignant. On June 7, he entered New York Hospital for more tests and treatment; to keep the news that he might have cancer a secret he registered under the assumed name "Howard Roberts, Jr.". While it was agreed that Taft in fact had cancer, the physicians treating him were not in agreement on how to treat him, especially considering that none of them were aware where the primary tumor was (a postmortem examination discovered the tumor originated in his pancreas). Some thought that surgery to remove the tumors would be the best option for Taft, while others felt the cancer had spread too far and thus palliative care, specifically X-ray therapy, was preferable. On June 10, 1953, Taft held a press conference in which he announced his illness and transferred his duties as Senate majority leader to Senator William F. Knowland of California. He did not resign his Senate seat and told reporters that he expected to recover and return to work.

However, Taft's condition continued to deteriorate and with the Senate in recess, he returned to New York Hospital for surgery on July 4. The surgery "did not take long, for the doctors discovered cancer everywhere ... there was no longer any doubt" that his condition was terminal. On July 31, Taft's wife paid him a visit in his hospital room. Several hours after she left, Taft suffered a brain hemorrhage and was pronounced dead shortly thereafter. His body lay in state at the United States Capitol rotunda, where thousands of mourners offered their respects at his coffin. On August 3, 1953, a memorial service was held in the rotunda; in addition to his family the service was attended by Eisenhower, Vice President Nixon, the cabinet, members of the Supreme Court, and Taft's congressional colleagues. Following the service his body was flown to Cincinnati, where he was buried in a private ceremony at Indian Hill Episcopal Church Cemetery.

In 1957, a committee led by Senator John F. Kennedy selected Taft as one of five great senators whose portraits would adorn the President's Room off the Senate floor. Kennedy would feature him in Profiles in Courage, and Taft continues to be regarded by historians as one of the most powerful senators of the 20th century.

The Taft Homes in Peoria, Illinois and Taft Houses New York City are public housing projects named in honor of him.

=== Memorial ===
The Robert A. Taft Memorial, featuring a 10-foot (3.0 m) statue by the sculptor Wheeler Williams and a bell tower, is located north of the Capitol on Constitution Avenue. The inscription on the tower face behind him reads:

This Memorial to Robert A. Taft, presented by the people to the Congress of the United States, stands as a tribute to the honesty, indomitable courage, and high principles of free government symbolized by his life.

== See also ==
- List of members of the United States Congress who died in office (1950–1999)

Party political offices
Preceded by Gilbert Bettman	Republican nominee for U.S. Senator from Ohio (Class 3); 1938, 1944, 1950	Succeeded by George H. Bender
New office	Chair of the Senate Republican Policy Committee; 1944–1953	Succeeded by William F. Knowland
Preceded by Styles Bridges	Senate Republican Leader; 1953	Succeeded by William F. Knowland
U.S. Senate
Preceded by Robert J. Bulkley	U.S. Senator (Class 3) from Ohio; 1939–1953; Served alongside: A. Victor Donahey, Harold H. Burton, James W. Huffman, Kingsley A. Taft, John W. Bricker	Succeeded by Thomas A. Burke
New office	Chair of the Joint Economic Report Committee; 1946–1949	Succeeded by Joseph C. O'Mahoney
Preceded by James E. Murray	Chair of the Senate Labor Committee; 1947–1949	Succeeded by Elbert D. Thomas
Preceded by Ernest McFarland	Senate Minority Leader; 1953	Succeeded by William F. Knowland
Honorary titles
Preceded by John J. Pershing	Persons who have lain in state or honor in the United States Capitol rotunda 1953	Succeeded by Unknown Soldiers of World War II and the Korean War
