= John C. Lee =

American general and politician

John Calvin Lee
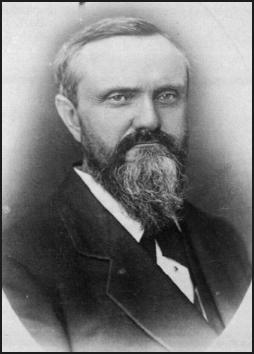

9th Lieutenant Governor of Ohio
- In office January 13, 1868 – January 8, 1872
- Governor: Rutherford B. Hayes
- Preceded by: Andrew McBurney
- Succeeded by: Jacob Mueller

Personal details
- Born: January 7, 1828 Delaware County, Ohio, U.S.
- Died: March 24, 1891 (aged 63) Toledo, Ohio, U.S.
- Resting place: Greenlawn Cemetery, Tiffin, Ohio
- Party: Republican
- Education: Western Reserve College

Military service
- Allegiance: United States of America; Union
- Branch/service: Union Army
- Years of service: 1861 - 1864
- Rank: Colonel; Bvt. Brigadier general
- Commands: 55th Ohio Infantry; 164th Ohio Infantry
- Battles/wars: American Civil War

John Calvin Lee (January 7, 1828 – March 24, 1891) was an American Republican politician and soldier who served as the ninth lieutenant governor of Ohio from 1868 to 1872.

== Biography ==
Lee was born January 7, 1828, at Brown Township, Delaware County, Ohio. He received a public education and attended Central College Franklin County for one year, went to Western Reserve College, known now as Case Western Reserve University, in 1845 and graduated in 1848. He taught school for two years, then began study of law at Atwater, Ohio, where he was admitted to the bar July 6, 1852. He ran for Common Pleas Judge in 1857, but lost.

== War years ==
Whitelaw Reid wrote this of Lee's service:

John C Lee was residing at Tiffin, at the beginning of the rebellion, engaged in successful practice of the law. On the 25th of November, 1861, he was commissioned Colonel of the Fifty-Fifth Ohio Infantry, and soon after was ordered to West Virginia. He served for a short time as president of a court-martial convened by order of General Rosecrans at Charleston, and then joined his regiment at Romney. Being the senior officer he was placed in command of the district of South Potomac by General Schenck. He marched under Schenck to the relief of Milroy at McDowell in May, 1862. He also participated in the Shenandoah Campaign which culminated in the Battle of Cross Keys. He was in the battles of Freeman's Ford, White Sulphur Springs, Warrenton, Bristow's Station, New Baltimore, New Market, Thoroughfare Gap, Gainesville, Chantilly, and the Second Bull Run, in all of which he received the special commendation of his superior officers. At Chancellorsville, in 1863, he was on the right when the enemy made such a furious assault on the eleventh corps, and by his determined efforts, aided by Orland Smith of the Seventy-Third Ohio and McGroarty of the Sixty-First, did much to stay the tide of Rebel success. On the account of severe illness in his family General Lee unwillingly tendered his resignation, which was received May 18, 1863. When the National Guard was called out he was commissioned Colonel of the One Hundred and Sixty-Fourth Ohio, which did service around the fortifications of Washington. He was mustered out August 27, 1864, and was brevetted Brigadier-General March 1865.

— Whitelaw Reid, 1895

== Political career ==
In 1867, General Lee was nominated for lieutenant governor after Samuel Galloway declined the nomination. He won that year, and again in 1869.

In 1868, Lee was Delegate-at-large to the Republican National Convention, and in 1872 Presidential Elector-at-large. In 1877 he was appointed United States District Attorney for the Northern District of Ohio, for the term ending 1881.

== Death ==
He died at Toledo on March 24, 1891.

Political offices
| Preceded by Andrew McBurney | Lieutenant Governor of Ohio; 1868-1872 | Succeeded by Jacob Mueller |
