= John T. Brown =

American politician

John T. Brown (March 14, 1876 – January 18, 1951) was an American politician who served as the 42nd lieutenant governor of Ohio from 1929 to 1931 serving under Governor Myers Y. Cooper.

== Biography ==
Brown was born in Plain City, Madison County, Ohio. He was a Republican and a Methodist.

He died January 18, 1951, in Madison County, Ohio, of congestive heart failure.

Political offices
Preceded by George C. Braden	Lieutenant Governor of Ohio; 1929-1931	Succeeded by William G. Pickrel
