= George C. Braden =

American politician

George Clermont Braden

41st Lieutenant Governor of Ohio
- In office November 1928 – January 14, 1929
- Governor: A. Victor Donahey
- Preceded by: William G. Pickrel
- Succeeded by: John T. Brown

Personal details
- Born: August 18, 1868 Greene Township, Trumbull County, Ohio, U.S.
- Died: January 8, 1942 (aged 73) Warren, Ohio, U.S.
- Resting place: Oaklawn Mausoleum
- Party: Republican
- Spouse: Elizabeth Meredith
- Children: 1

George C. Braden (August 18, 1868 – January 8, 1942) was an American politician who served as the 41st lieutenant governor of Ohio from 1928 to 1929.

Political offices
Preceded by William G. Pickrel	Lieutenant Governor of Ohio; 1928-1929	Succeeded by John T. Brown
