= 1938 United States Senate election in Ohio =

- November 8, 1938
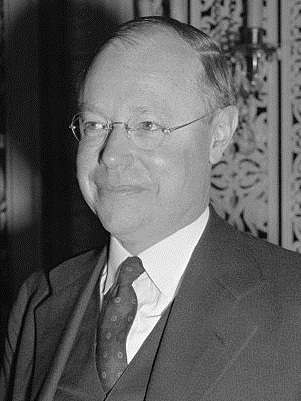

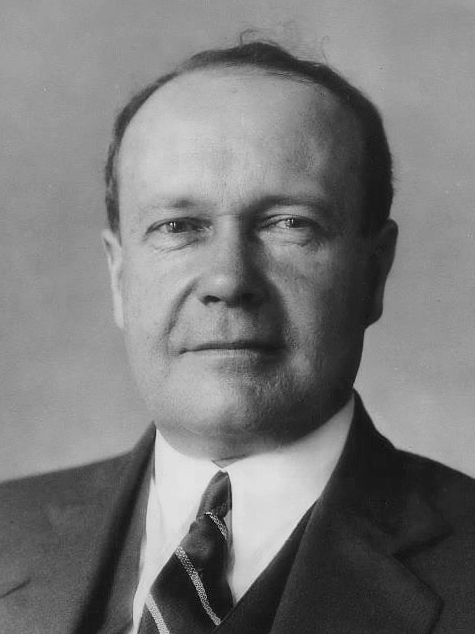
Nominee	Robert A. Taft	Robert J. Bulkley
Party	Republican	Democratic
Popular vote	1,255,414	1,085,792
Percentage	53.62%	46.38%
- County results Taft: 50–60% 60–70% 70–80% Bulkley: 50–60% 60–70%
U.S. senator before election
Robert J. Bulkley
Democratic
Elected U.S. Senator
Robert A. Taft
Republican

The 1938 United States Senate election in Ohio took place on November 8, 1938. Incumbent Senator Robert J. Bulkley ran for re-election to a second full term in office, but was defeated by the Republican nominee, former state Senator Robert A. Taft, the elder son of former President and supreme court chief justice William Howard Taft. Taft's victory was a part of a major Republican wave nationally, where Republicans gained 8 Senate seats and 81 seats in the House of Representatives, which was largely attributable to incumbent Democratic President Franklin Roosevelts's unpopularity in the aftermath of the Recession of 1937–1938 and the President's controversial plan to add more seats to the Supreme Court, which he proposed after the court ruled some of his New Deal programs unconstitutional. Taft's victory marked the beginning of 4 consecutive Republican victories in this seat, and Democrats would not win it again until Governor Frank Lausche won it in 1956.

== General election ==
=== Candidates ===
- Robert J. Bulkley, incumbent Senator since 1930 (Democratic)
- Robert A. Taft, former State Senator from Cincinnati and Speaker of the Ohio House of Representatives (Republican)

=== Results ===
1938 United States Senate election in Ohio
Party	Candidate	Votes	%	±%
Republican	Robert A. Taft	1,255,414	53.62%	▲6.14
Democratic	Robert J. Bulkley (incumbent)	1,085,792	46.38%	▼6.14
Total votes		2,341,206	100.00%	

== See also ==
- 1938 United States Senate elections
