= Andrew McBurney =

American politician

Andrew Graham McBurney
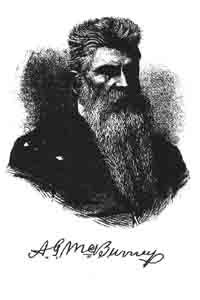

8th Lieutenant Governor of Ohio
- In office January 8, 1866 – January 13, 1868
- Governor: Jacob Dolson Cox
- Preceded by: Charles Anderson
- Succeeded by: John C. Lee

Personal details
- Born: November 13, 1817 Montgomery, Ohio, U.S.
- Died: April 23, 1894 (aged 76) Lebanon, Ohio, U.S.
- Resting place: Lebanon
- Party: Republican

Andrew Graham McBurney (November 13, 1817 – April 23, 1894) was an American Republican politician who served as the eighth lieutenant governor of Ohio from 1866 to 1868.

== Biography ==
McBurney was born in 1815 near Montgomery, Ohio, and was the eldest son of James and Magdalen Falen McBurney. The family soon moved to Lebanon, Ohio, where McBurney finished his apprenticeship as a cabinet-maker in 1836. He read law in 1840, and was admitted to the bar 1843. He became a law partner to Thomas Corwin.

== Career ==
McBurney was a Democrat until the start of the Civil War, when he became a Republican. In 1861 and 1863, he was elected to the Ohio Senate, representing the Second District (Butler and Warren counties) in the Fifty-fifth and Fifty-sixth General Assembly.

In 1865, he was elected Lieutenant Governor, serving one term. He was an elector on the Grant/Colfax ticket in 1868, but did not again participate in Politics. In 1871 he was co-counsel with Clement Vallandigham in a murder trial. He was the only witness to see Vallandigham accidentally shoot himself to death in the Golden Lamb Inn. He died 1894 in Lebanon. McBurney is buried in Lebanon.

Political offices
Preceded by Charles Anderson	Lieutenant Governor of Ohio; 1866-1868	Succeeded by John C. Lee
Ohio Senate
Preceded by Thomas Moore	Senator from 2nd District; 1862-1865	Succeeded by Noah C. McFarland
