= W. A. Greenlund =

American politician

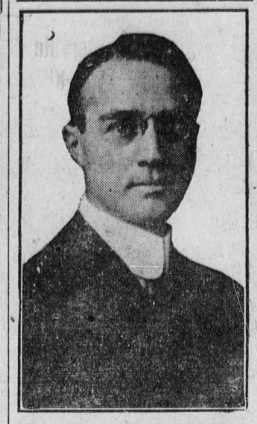
- Greenlund in 1913

Lieutenant Governor of Ohio
- In office 1913–1915
- Governor: James M. Cox

Personal details
- Born: February 20, 1873; Titusville, Pennsylvania, US
- Died: August 23, 1935 (aged 62)

William A. Greenlund (February 20, 1873 – August 23, 1935) was an American politician who served as the 33rd lieutenant governor of Ohio from 1913 to 1915 under Governor James M. Cox.

== Biography ==
W. A. Greenlund was born in Titusville, Pennsylvania, February 20, 1873. His father was an immigrant from Denmark. W. A. was educated at public schools and high school in Pittsburgh, Pennsylvania. In 1891, he moved to Cleveland, Ohio and engaged in the real estate business.

In 1901, Greenlund married Burleigh M. Fritz of Cleveland. The only office he held before becoming lieutenant governor was as a Democratic State Senator from Cuyahoga County in the 80th General Assembly.

Political offices
Preceded by Hugh L. Nichols	Lieutenant Governor of Ohio; 1913–1915	Succeeded by John H. Arnold
