= Alphonso Hart =

American politician

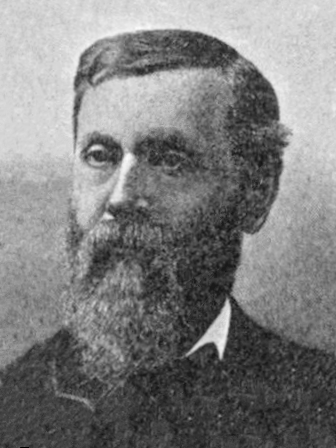

11th Lieutenant Governor of Ohio
- In office January 12, 1874 – January 10, 1876
- Governor: William Allen
- Preceded by: Jacob Mueller
- Succeeded by: Thomas L. Young

Member of the U.S. House of Representatives from Ohio's 12th district
- In office March 4, 1883 – March 3, 1885
- Preceded by: George L. Converse
- Succeeded by: Albert C. Thompson

Member of the Ohio Senate from the 26th district
- In office January 3, 1865 – December 31, 1865
- Preceded by: Luther Day
- Succeeded by: N. D. Tidballs
- In office January 1, 1872 – January 4, 1874
- Preceded by: Henry McKinney
- Succeeded by: N. W. Goodhue

Personal details
- Born: July 4, 1830 Vienna, Ohio, U.S.
- Died: December 23, 1910 (aged 80) Washington, D.C., U.S.
- Resting place: Maple Grove Cemetery, Ravenna, Ohio
- Party: Republican
- Spouse: Phebe Peck
- Children: two
- Education: Grand River Institute

Alphonso Hart (July 4, 1830 – December 23, 1910) was a Republican politician from the U.S. state of Ohio who was a U.S. representative, an Ohio state senator, and the 11th lieutenant governor of Ohio.

== Biography ==
Hart was born in Vienna Township, Trumbull County, Ohio. His father died when he was age twelve, and he was bound out to a farmer for three years. After seven months, he started out alone.

Hart attended the common schools and Grand River Institute, Austinburg, Ohio, and studied law in Warren, Ohio. He was admitted to the bar August 12, 1851.

Hart was married to Phebe Peck of Warren in 1856.

== Career ==
He moved to New Lisbon, Ohio, remained two years, and was then elected Assistant Clerk of the Ohio House of Representatives.

He purchased the Democratic newspaper "Portage Sentinel" in Ravenna, Ohio, which he edited until he sold it in 1857. He also practiced in Ravenna. He served as prosecuting attorney for Portage County from 1861 to 1864, when he resigned.

=== Early political offices ===
He served as member of the Ohio Senate in 1865, 1872, and 1874, and was the 11th Lieutenant Governor of Ohio from 1874 to 1876. He served as a Presidential elector for Grant/Wilson in 1872.

=== Congress ===
In 1874 he moved to Cleveland, Ohio, and in 1878 to Hillsboro, Ohio. In 1880 he was nominated for the Forty-seventh Congress in the seventh district but lost to John P. Leedom. Hart was elected as a Republican to the Forty-eighth Congress in the 12th district (March 4, 1883 – March 3, 1885). He was an unsuccessful candidate for election to the Forty-ninth Congress.

=== Later career ===
He served as Solicitor of Internal Revenue, Treasury Department from 1888 to 1892. He resumed the practice of law in Washington, D.C.

== Family ==
Hart's wife, Phebe, died in 1868. They had a son and a daughter.

== Death and burial ==
Hart died in 1910 and is interred in Maple Grove Cemetery, Ravenna, Portage County, Ohio US.

Political offices
Preceded by Jacob Mueller	Lieutenant Governor of Ohio; 1874–1876	Succeeded by Thomas L. Young
U.S. House of Representatives
Preceded by George L. Converse	Member of the U.S. House of Representatives from Ohio's 12th congressional district March 4, 1883-March 3, 1885	Succeeded by Albert C. Thompson
