= James Myers (politician) =

American politician

2nd Lieutenant Governor of Ohio
- In office January 9, 1854 – January 14, 1856
- Governor: William Medill
- Preceded by: William Medill
- Succeeded by: Thomas H. Ford

Member of the Ohio Senate from the Lucas & other Counties district
- In office December 4, 1848 – January 4, 1852
- Preceded by: Jesse Wheeler
- Succeeded by: William Mungen

Member of the Ohio House of Representatives from the Lucas County district
- In office January 6, 1862 – January 3, 1864
- Preceded by: Dennis Steele
- Succeeded by: Lorenze L. Morehouse

Personal details
- Born: June 1795 Dutchess County, New York, U.S.
- Died: July 19, 1864 (aged 69) Toledo, Ohio, U.S.
- Resting place: Forest Cemetery
- Party: Democratic, National Union

James Myers (1795-1864) was an American politician who served as the second lieutenant governor of Ohio from 1854 to 1856.

== Biography ==
James Myers was born in June 1795 in Dutchess County, New York, of German ancestry. When young, his parents moved to Albany and then Schenectady, where he grew up. During the War of 1812, he volunteered during the summer of 1813, and served on the northern frontier in the winter campaign under general Wade Hampton. The next summer he was stationed at Brooklyn Heights, near New York City.

After the war ended, Myers farmed and engaged in mercantile pursuits. In 1823 or 1825, he became collector of tolls at Schenectady on the new Erie Canal, until 1836, when he moved to Toledo, Ohio.

In Toledo, Myers became involved with the construction of the Miami and Erie Canal. After completion of the canal, he concentrated on property management and real estate. He was elected to two terms under Ohio's first constitution to the Ohio State Senate, to represent much of Northwest Ohio starting in 1848. Under the new constitution, he served a single term as Lieutenant Governor of Ohio as a Democrat.

He was in feeble health beginning in the mid-1850s, but served a two-year term as a representative from Lucas County in the Ohio House of Representatives during the American Civil War, after nomination by the Union convention.

Myers' health further declined, and after much pain, he died July 19, 1864, at his home, northwest corner of Jefferson and Superior Streets, Toledo.

Political offices
Preceded by William Medill	Lieutenant Governor of Ohio; 1854–1856	Succeeded by Thomas H. Ford
