= Thomas H. Ford =

American politician

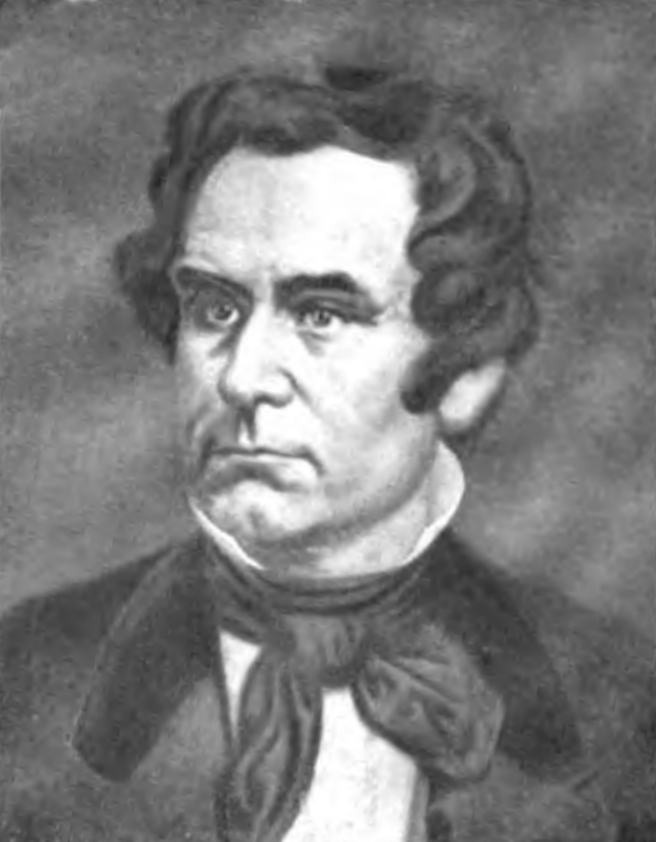

3rd Lieutenant Governor of Ohio
- In office January 14, 1856 – January 11, 1858
- Governor: Salmon P. Chase
- Preceded by: James Myers
- Succeeded by: Martin Welker

Personal details
- Born: August 23, 1814 Rockingham County, Virginia, U.S.
- Died: February 29, 1868 (aged 53) Washington, D.C., U.S.
- Resting place: Mansfield Cemetery, Mansfield, Ohio
- Party: Republican

Thomas H. Ford (August 23, 1814 – February 29, 1868) was an American Republican politician who served as the third lieutenant governor of Ohio from 1856 to 1858.

Ford was born August 23, 1814, at Rockingham County, Virginia. He had little formal education and his occupation was a farmer. He studied law and was admitted to the bar. He moved to Mansfield, Ohio, and became an anti-slavery leader. After delivering a speech at Philadelphia espousing the Republican party, he was offered the nomination for lieutenant governor in 1855, and won election to a single term. In 1860, he was chosen Government Printer by the United States House of Representatives. He served in the Mexican War, and was Colonel of the 32nd Ohio Infantry, Ohio Volunteer Militia during the U.S. Civil War. Ford was arrested in 1862, and sent to Washington, D.C., for trial by a military commission. He was charged with having neglected his duty in the defense of Maryland Heights at the Battle of Harpers Ferry, September, 1862. After trial, Ford was ordered dismissed from the service on November 8, 1862, by order of the War Department. He located in Washington, D.C., where he had a lucrative law practice, and where he died February 29, 1868.

He was buried in Mansfield Cemetery.

== Notes ==
Political offices
| Preceded by James Myers | Lieutenant Governor of Ohio; 1856–1858 | Succeeded by Martin Welker |
