= Earl D. Bloom =

American politician

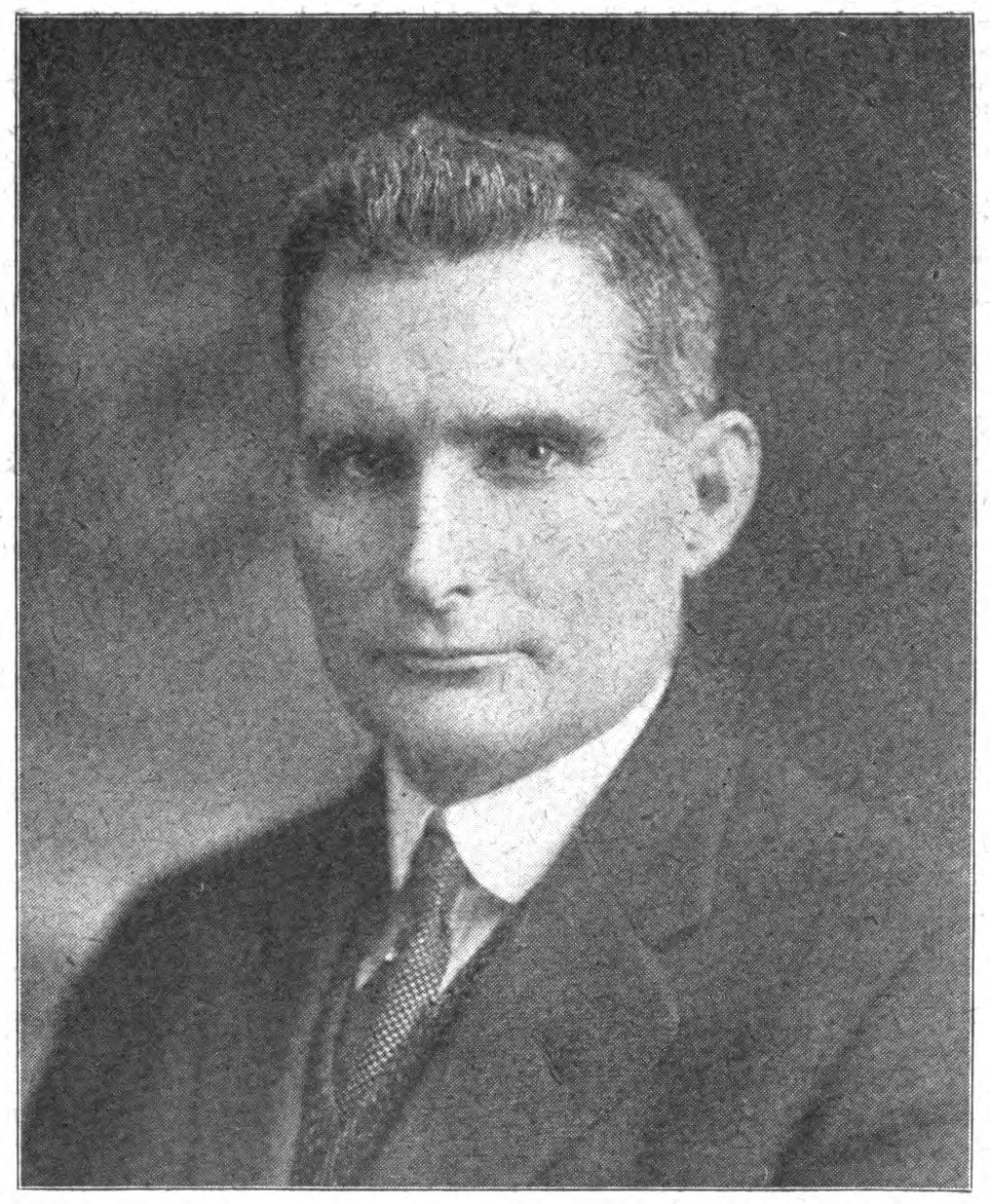
- circa 1918

35th, 37th and 39th Lieutenant Governor of Ohio
- In office January 10, 1927 – April 1928
- Governor: Vic Donahey
- Preceded by: Charles H. Lewis
- Succeeded by: William G. Pickrel
- In office January 8, 1923 – January 12, 1925
- Governor: Vic Donahey
- Preceded by: Clarence J. Brown
- Succeeded by: Charles H. Lewis
- In office January 8, 1917 – January 13, 1919
- Governor: James M. Cox
- Preceded by: John H. Arnold
- Succeeded by: Clarence J. Brown

Personal details
- Born: May 29, 1871 Wood County, Ohio
- Died: June 8, 1930 (aged 59) Toledo, Ohio
- Resting place: Old Maplewood Cemetery; North Baltimore, Ohio
- Party: Democratic
- Spouse: Eleanor G. Lathrop
- Children: one
- Education: Ohio Northern University Pettit College of Law

Earl D. Bloom (May 29, 1871 – June 8, 1930) was an American politician who served as the 35th, 37th and 39th lieutenant governor of Ohio from 1917 to 1919, 1923 to 1925, and 1927 to 1928.

Bloom ran for governor in 1928 but lost in the Democratic primary. He was a lawyer and a banker.

== Biography ==
Earl Bloom was born in Wood County, Ohio May 29, 1871 to James L. and Lydia A. (Ackerman) Bloom. He attended public schools of Wood County, and from 1889 to 1895 Ohio Northern University College of Law, where he received an LL.B.

In 1895, Bloom was admitted to the bar and was married to Eleanor G. Lathrop July 24. They had one child, Alice G. Bloom. Bloom practiced law in Bloomdale, Ohio, before moving to Bowling Green, Ohio in 1905.

During World War I, Bloom was director of the Red Cross in Wood County. He was a member of F. & A.M., R. A. M., Knights Templar, Scottish Rite, 32nd Degree, Independent Order of Odd Fellows, B.P.O.E., and the Wood County Bar Association.

Bloom died in Toledo, and is buried in Old Maplewood Cemetery, North Baltimore, Ohio.

== Sources ==
- Political Graveyard entry on Bloom

Political offices
Preceded by John H. Arnold	Lieutenant Governor of Ohio; 1917–1919	Succeeded by Clarence J. Brown Sr.
Preceded by Clarence J. Brown Sr.	Lieutenant Governor of Ohio; 1923–1925	Succeeded by Charles H. Lewis
Preceded by Charles H. Lewis	Lieutenant Governor of Ohio; 1927–1928	Succeeded by William G. Pickrel
