= William G. Pickrel =

American politician

Lieutenant Governor of Ohio
- In office 1931–1933
- Governor: Vic Donahey
- Preceded by: John T. Brown
- Succeeded by: Charles W. Sawyer
- In office 1928
- Governor: Vic Donahey
- Preceded by: Earl D. Bloom
- Succeeded by: George C. Braden

Personal details
- Born: February 1, 1888 Jackson, Ohio, U.S.
- Died: March 7, 1966 (aged 78) Dayton, Ohio U.S.
- Party: Democratic

William Gillespie Pickrel (February 1, 1888 – March 7, 1966) was an American attorney and politician who served as the 40th and 43rd lieutenant governor of Ohio in 1928 and 1931–1933 under Governor Vic Donahey.

== Biography ==
William G. Pickrel, nicknamed "Big Bill", was born in Jackson, Ohio on February 1, 1888, the son of D. L. and Martha (née Miller) Pickrel. He was educated in Jackson and Dayton, graduated from Miami University in Oxford, Ohio in 1910, received a law degree from the University of Cincinnati College of Law in 1912, and practiced law in Dayton.

Pickrel was a civic and legal activist, including serving as President of the Dayton and Ohio Bar Associations, a state bar examiner, a director of the Dayton Chamber of Commerce and a trustee of Miami University.

A member of the Democratic Party, Pickrel ran unsuccessfully for the United States House of Representatives in 1920. In 1928 Cyrus Locher was appointed to the United States Senate. Lieutenant Governor Earl D. Bloom resigned in order to accept appointment to Locher's place as state Secretary of Commerce, and Pickrel was then appointed to the lieutenant governor's office vacated by Bloom. Pickrel completed Bloom's term, serving from April to November, 1928.

In 1930 Pickrel was the successful Democratic nominee for lieutenant governor and served one term, January 1931 to January 1933. He was renominated for lieutenant governor in 1932, but withdrew before the general election. He was an unsuccessful candidate for the Democratic nomination for governor in 1934.

In 1944 he ran unsuccessfully for the United States Senate against Republican incumbent Robert A. Taft; he received 49.7% of the vote to Taft's 50.3%. He died of a heart ailment in a Dayton hospital on March 7, 1966.

Party political offices
Preceded by Robert J. Bulkley	Democratic nominee for U.S. Senator from Ohio (Class 3); 1944	Succeeded by Joseph T. Ferguson
Political offices
Preceded by Earl D. Bloom	Lieutenant Governor of Ohio; 1928	Succeeded by George C. Braden
Preceded by John T. Brown	Lieutenant Governor of Ohio; 1931–1933	Succeeded by Charles W. Sawyer
