= John H. Arnold (politician) =

American politician (1862–1944)

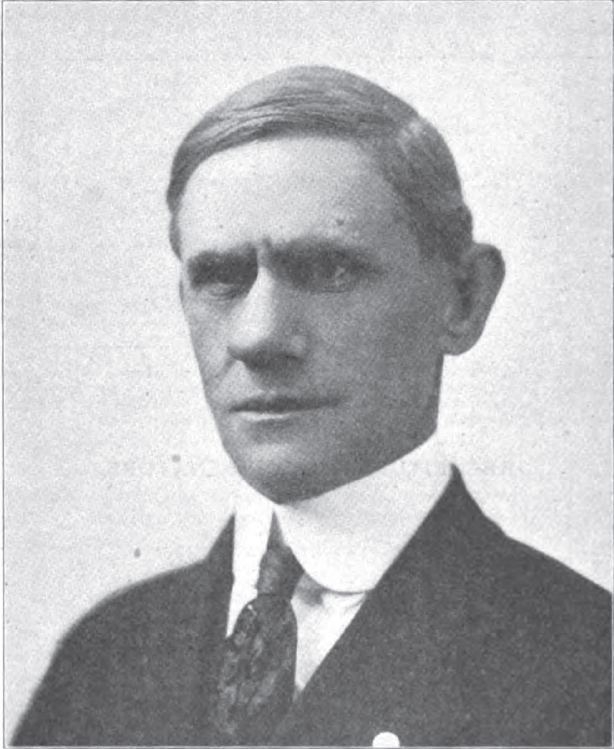

34th Lieutenant Governor of Ohio
- In office January 11, 1915 – January 8, 1917
- Governor: Frank B. Willis
- Preceded by: W. A. Greenlund
- Succeeded by: Earl D. Bloom

Personal details
- Born: December 11, 1862
- Died: February 29, 1944 (aged 81)
- Political party: Republican

John Holmes Arnold (December 11, 1862 – March 29, 1944) was an American politician who served as the 34th lieutenant governor of Ohio from 1915 to 1917 under Governor Frank B. Willis. A 1917 publication of the Ohio General Assembly had this to say about Arnold:

John H. Arnold,
Lieutenant Governor and President of the Senate.
John H. Arnold was elected Lieutenant Governor of Ohio, November 3, 1914, as a Republican, and presided over the regular session of the Senate of the eighty-first General Assembly.
He was born at Freeport, Pennsylvania, December 11, 1862, and went with his parents to Pittsburgh, Pennsylvania, where he was educated in public schools and where he resided until he moved to Columbus, Ohio, October 1, 1885.
While employed at the Pennsylvania Railroad shops he read law at night under Henry F. Guerin and was admitted to the practice of law in October, 1894. August 17, 1904, he was married to Eleanor A. Moore, who was born near Johnstown, Licking County, Ohio, and they reside at 467 North Garfield Avenue, Columbus, Ohio.
Besides the practice of law Mr. Arnold is interested in the production of oil in Morgan County. When employed in factories, he was a member of organized labor, and is a strong advocate of tariff and restricted immigration, believing that no more immigrants should be admitted than can be assimilated by our population.
He is a member of Columbus Chamber of Commerce, Masons, Oaks, W.O.W., K. of P., Loyal Order of Moose, Jr. O.U.A.M., P.O.S. of A., The Columbus Caledonian Association and other secret beneficial societies.

Arnold died March 29, 1944, and is interred at Green Lawn Cemetery, Columbus, Ohio.

Political offices
Preceded by W. A. Greenlund	Lieutenant Governor of Ohio; 1915–1917	Succeeded by Earl D. Bloom
