= Hugh L. Nichols =

American judge

Hugh Llewellyn Nichols
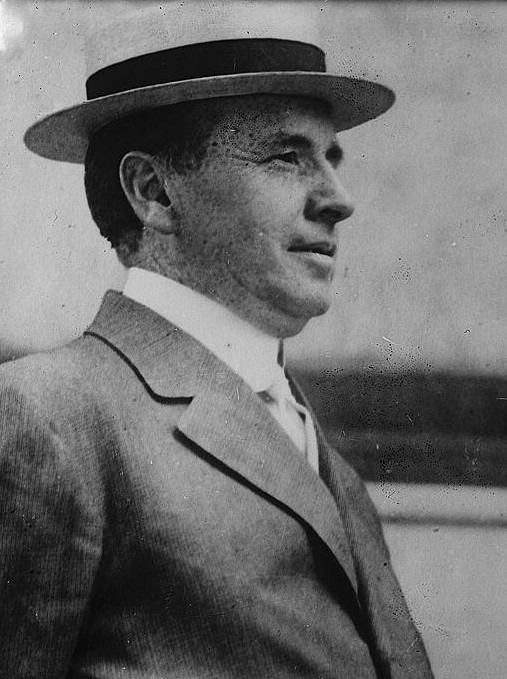

32nd Lieutenant Governor of Ohio
- In office March 1, 1911 – January 13, 1913
- Governor: Judson Harmon
- Preceded by: Atlee Pomerene
- Succeeded by: W. A. Greenlund

Chief Justice of the Ohio Supreme Court
- In office September 22, 1913 – December 31, 1920
- Appointed by: James M. Cox
- Succeeded by: Carrington T. Marshall

Member of the Ohio Senate from the 2nd & 4th district
- In office January 3, 1898 – December 31, 1899
- Preceded by: Lee A. Tissander
- Succeeded by: Emmons B. Stivers, W. F. Roudebush

Personal details
- Born: March 25, 1865 New Richmond, Ohio
- Died: December 29, 1942 (aged 77) Cincinnati, Ohio
- Resting place: Batavia Union Cemetery, Batavia, Ohio
- Party: Democratic
- Spouse: Louisa Dean Sterling
- Education: Ohio Wesleyan University; Cincinnati Law School

Hugh Llewellyn Nichols (March 25, 1865 – December 29, 1942) was an American politician who served as the 32nd lieutenant governor of Ohio from 1911 to 1913 and as Chief Justice of the Supreme Court of Ohio from 1913 to 1920.

== Biography ==
Hugh L. Nichols was born on March 25, 1865, in New Richmond, Clermont to Perry Jackson and Jeannette Gilmore Nichols. He was educated in public schools in Batavia, Ohio, and attended the Ohio Wesleyan University in Delaware, Ohio, where he was a member of the Chi Phi fraternity. He also attended the Cincinnati Law School and was admitted to the bar in 1886.

In 1887, Nichols married Louise Dean Stirling of Batavia, Ohio.

In the autumn of 1897, Nichols was elected to the Ohio State Senate, representing the 2nd and 4th Districts (Butler, Warren, Clermont, and Brown County, Ohio), for the 73rd General Assembly, 1898–1899. In the 1898 election, he was nominated by the Democrats for a seat on the Ohio Supreme Court, but lost to Republican William T. Spear. He was a delegate to the 1900 Democratic National Convention and served as Chairman of the Democratic State Executive Committee, where he managed the successful campaign of Governor Harmon.

In 1911, Lieutenant Governor Atlee Pomerene was elected to the United States Senate and resigned. Governor Harmon appointed Nichols to fill the vacancy, and he was re-elected in 1912.

On September 22, 1913, Nichols was appointed to the new position of Chief Justice of the Ohio Supreme Court by Governor James Cox. He was elected to a full six-year term in 1914, serving until the end of 1920. He lost re-election in 1920.

After his defeat in 1920, Nichols founded the Cincinnati firm Nichols, Wood, Marx and Ginter, where he was senior partner until his death.

In 1922, Nichols was appointed chairman of the U. S. Grant Memorial Centenary Association, which directed the restoration of the Grant Birthplace in Point Pleasant, Ohio, and its acquisition by the state.

On October 19, 1942, Nichols was admitted to Jewish Hospital in Cincinnati with a fractured vertebra. He died there of a coronary thrombosis on December 29, 1942, and was buried in Batavia Union Cemetery. He had an adopted daughter, Amy House Nichols, who preceded him in death.

Nichols was a Presbyterian.

Political offices
| Preceded by Atlee Pomerene | Lieutenant Governor of Ohio; 1911–1913 | Succeeded by W. A. Greenlund |
