= Lieutenant Governor of Ohio =

- Seal of the lieutenant governor

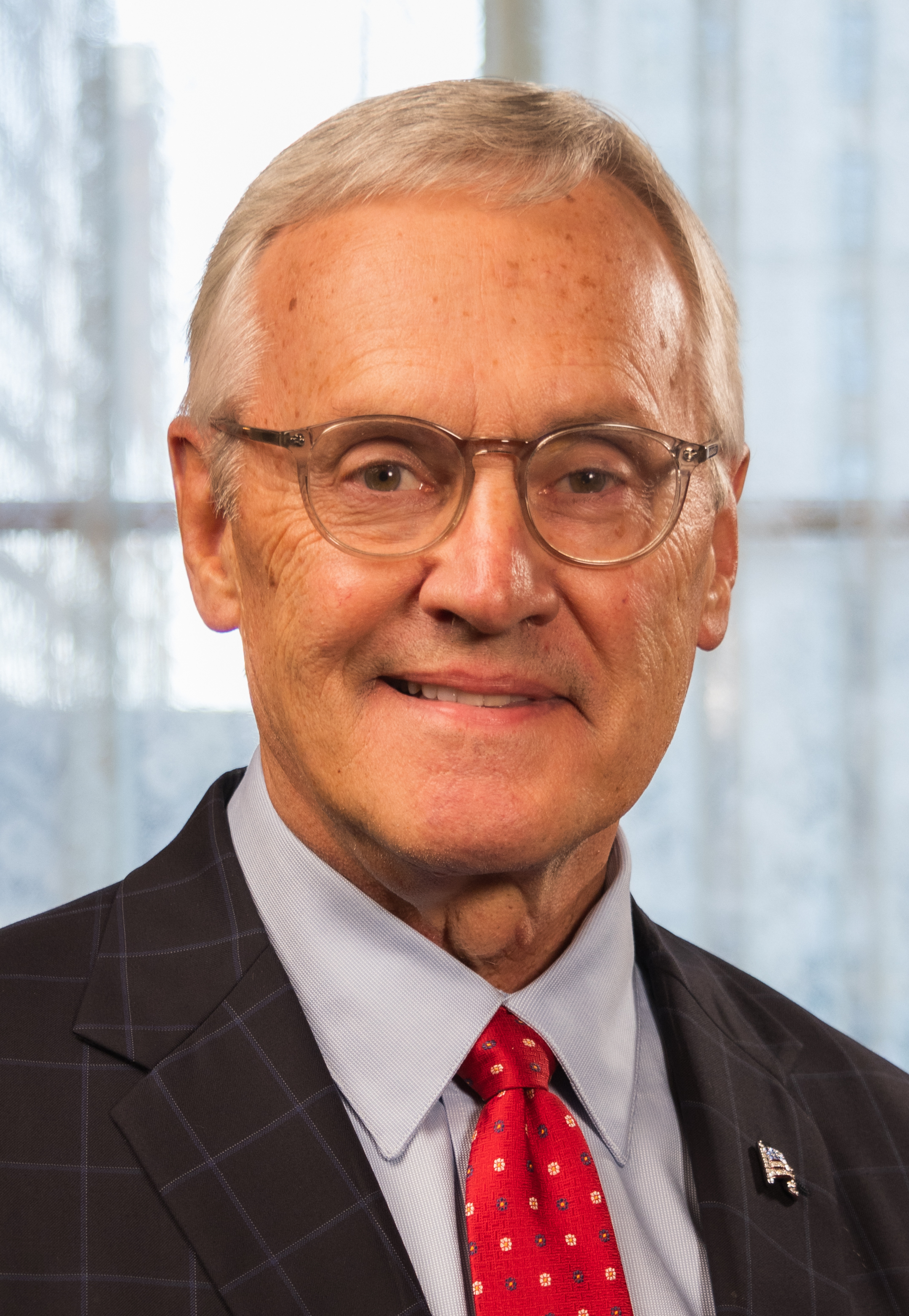
- Incumbent; Jim Tressel since February 14, 2025
- Style: The Honorable
- Term length: Four years, two consecutive with four-year pause thereafter
- Inaugural holder: William Medill (1852)
- Formation: Ohio Constitution
- Succession: First
- Salary: $126,360 (2023)
- Website: Official website

The position of lieutenant governor of Ohio was established in 1852. The lieutenant governor becomes governor if the governor resigns, dies in office or is removed via impeachment conviction. Before 1852, the president of the Ohio State Senate would serve as acting governor if a vacancy in the governorship occurred. Until 1978, lieutenant governors were elected separately but concurrently with the governor (not on a "ticket"). Thus, there were several occasions when the lieutenant governor was from a different party than the governor. This was changed by constitutional amendment. In 1974, Richard F. Celeste was the last lieutenant governor to be elected separately. In 1978, George Voinovich became the first lieutenant governor to be elected on the same ticket with the governor.

From 1852 to 1979, the lieutenant governor also served as the president of the Ohio State Senate. More recently, Ohio governors have generally named the lieutenant governor to head an agency of state government. An example of this is Bruce Edward Johnson, who served as Director of the Ohio Department of Development, as did his successor, Lee Fisher. Recent Lt. Governor Mary Taylor was the director of the Ohio Department of Insurance, until she was replaced by Jillian Froment in 2017.

== List of lieutenant governors ==
Parties

Democratic Republican

#	Lt. Governor	Took office	Left office	Party	Notes
1	William Medill (1802–1865)	January 12, 1852	July 13, 1853	Democratic	Became governor July 13, 1853
Office vacant from July 13, 1853 – January 9, 1854
2	James Myers (1795–1864)	January 9, 1854	January 14, 1856	Democratic	
3	Thomas H. Ford (1814–1868)	January 14, 1856	January 11, 1858	Republican	
4	Martin Welker (1819–1902)	January 11, 1858	January 9, 1860	Republican	
5	Robert C. Kirk (1821–1898)	January 9, 1860	January 13, 1862	Republican	
6	Benjamin Stanton (1809–1872)	January 13, 1862	January 11, 1864	Republican	
7	Charles Anderson (1814–1895)	January 11, 1864	August 29, 1865	Republican	
Office vacant from August 29, 1865 – January 8, 1866
8	Andrew McBurney (1817–1894)	January 8, 1866	January 13, 1868	Republican	
9	John C. Lee (1828–1891)	January 13, 1868	January 8, 1872	Republican	
10	Jacob Mueller (1822–1905)	January 8, 1872	January 12, 1874	Republican	
11	Alphonso Hart (1830–1910)	January 12, 1874	January 10, 1876	Republican	
12	Thomas Lowry Young (1832–1888)	January 10, 1876	March 2, 1877	Republican	
13	H. W. Curtiss (1824–1902)	March 2, 1877	January 14, 1878	Republican	(acting)
14	Jabez W. Fitch (1823–1884)	January 14, 1878	January 12, 1880	Democratic	
15	Andrew Hickenlooper (1837–1904)	January 12, 1880	January 9, 1882	Republican	
16	Rees G. Richards (1842–1917)	January 9, 1882	January 14, 1884	Republican	
17	John George Warwick (1830–1892)	January 14, 1884	January 11, 1886	Democratic	
18	Robert P. Kennedy (1840–1918)	January 11, 1886	March 3, 1887	Republican	
19	Silas A. Conrad (1840–1913)	March 3, 1887	January 9, 1888	Republican	
20	William C. Lyon (1841–1908)	January 9, 1888	January 13, 1890	Republican	
21	Elbert L. Lampson (1852–1930)	January 13, 1890	January 31, 1890	Republican	
22	William V. Marquis (1828–1899)	January 31, 1890	January 11, 1892	Democratic	
23	Andrew L. Harris (1835–1915)	January 11, 1892	January 13, 1896	Republican	
24	Asa W. Jones (1838–1918)	January 13, 1896	January 8, 1900	Republican	
25	John A. Caldwell (1852–1927)	January 8, 1900	January 13, 1902	Republican	
26	Carl L. Nippert (1852–1904)	January 13, 1902	May 1, 1902	Republican	resigned May 1, 1902
Office vacant from May 1 – June 26, 1902
27	Harry L. Gordon (1860–1921)	June 26, 1902	January 11, 1904	Republican	
28	Warren G. Harding (1865–1923)	January 11, 1904	January 8, 1906	Republican	
29	Andrew L. Harris (2nd) (1835–1915)	January 8, 1906	June 18, 1906	Republican	
Office vacant from June 18, 1906 – January 11, 1909
30	Francis W. Treadway (1869–1925)	January 11, 1909	January 9, 1911	Republican	
31	Atlee Pomerene (1863–1937)	January 9, 1911	March 3, 1911	Democratic	
32	Hugh L. Nichols (1865–1942)	March 3, 1911	January 13, 1913	Democratic	
33	W. A. Greenlund (1873–1935)	January 13, 1913	January 11, 1915	Democratic	
34	John H. Arnold (1862–1944)	January 11, 1915	January 8, 1917	Republican	
35	Earl D. Bloom (1871–1930)	January 8, 1917	January 12, 1919	Democratic	
36	Clarence J. Brown Sr. (1893–1965)	January 12, 1919	January 8, 1923	Republican	
37	Earl D. Bloom (2nd) (1871–1930)	January 8, 1923	January 12, 1925	Democratic	
38	Charles H. Lewis (1871–1965)	January 12, 1925	January 10, 1927	Republican	
39	Earl D. Bloom (3rd) (1871–1930)	January 10, 1927	April 1928	Democratic	
40.	William G. Pickrel (1888–1966)	April 1928	November 1928	Democratic	
41	George C. Braden (1868–1942)	November 1928	January 14, 1929	Republican	
42	John T. Brown (1876–1951)	January 14, 1929	January 12, 1931	Republican	
43	William G. Pickrel (2nd) (1888–1966)	January 12, 1931	January 9, 1933	Democratic	
44	Charles W. Sawyer (1887–1979)	January 9, 1933	January 14, 1935	Democratic	
45	Harold G. Mosier (1889–1971)	January 14, 1935	January 11, 1937	Democratic	
46	Paul P. Yoder (1897–1965)	January 11, 1937	January 9, 1939	Democratic	
47	Paul M. Herbert (1889–1983)	January 9, 1939	January 8, 1945	Republican	
48	George D. Nye (1898–1969)	January 8, 1945	January 13, 1947	Democratic	
49	Paul M. Herbert (2nd) (1889–1983)	January 13, 1947	January 10, 1949	Republican	
50	George D. Nye (2nd) (1898–1969)	January 10, 1949	January 12, 1953	Democratic	
51	John William Brown (1913–1993)	January 12, 1953	January 3, 1957	Republican	
Office vacant from January 3 – 14, 1957
52	Paul M. Herbert (3rd) (1889–1983)	January 14, 1957	January 12, 1959	Republican	
53	John W. Donahey (1905–1967)	January 12, 1959	January 14, 1963	Democratic	
54	John William Brown (1913–1993)	January 14, 1963	January 13, 1975	Republican	
55	Dick Celeste (b. 1937)	January 13, 1975	January 8, 1979	Democratic	
56	George Voinovich (1936–2016)	January 8, 1979	November 1979	Republican	resigned to become Mayor of Cleveland
Office vacant from November [?], 1979 – January 10, 1983
57	Myrl H. Shoemaker (1913–1985)	January 10, 1983	July 30, 1985 (Died)	Democratic	(died in office)
Office vacant from July 30, 1985 – January 12, 1987
58	Paul R. Leonard (b. 1943)	January 12, 1987	January 14, 1991	Democratic	
59	Mike DeWine (b. 1947)	January 14, 1991	November 12, 1994	Republican	Resigned after being elected to U.S. Senate
Office vacant from November 12, 1994 – January 5, 1995
60	Nancy Hollister (b. 1949)	January 9, 1995	December 31, 1998	Republican	became governor December 31, 1998
Office vacant from December 31, 1998 – January 11, 1999
61	Maureen O'Connor (b. 1951)	January 11, 1999	December 31, 2002	Republican	resigned to become Supreme Court Justice
Office vacant from December 31, 2002 – January 13, 2003
62	Jennette Bradley (b. 1952)	January 13, 2003	January 5, 2005	Republican	(Appointed State Treasurer)
63	Bruce E. Johnson (b. 1960)	January 5, 2005	December 8, 2006	Republican	resigned December 8, 2006
Office vacant from December 8, 2006 – January 8, 2007
64	Lee Fisher (b. 1951)	January 8, 2007	January 10, 2011	Democratic	
65	Mary Taylor (b. 1966)	January 10, 2011	January 14, 2019	Republican	
66	Jon Husted (b. 1967)	January 14, 2019	January 21, 2025	Republican	resigned January 21, 2025 after being appointed to the United States Senate
Office vacant from January 21 – February 14, 2025
67	Jim Tressel (b. 1952)	February 14, 2025	present	Republican	Incumbent. Appointed after Husted’s resignation upon becoming a US Senator
68	David Pepper (b. 1971)	Lieutenant Governor-elect; Assuming office on January 11, 2027		Democratic	Elect

== See also ==
- List of Ohio lieutenant gubernatorial elections
- List of governors of Ohio
- List of United States senators from Ohio
- List of United States representatives from Ohio
- List of Ohio politicians
