= Martin Welker =

American judge

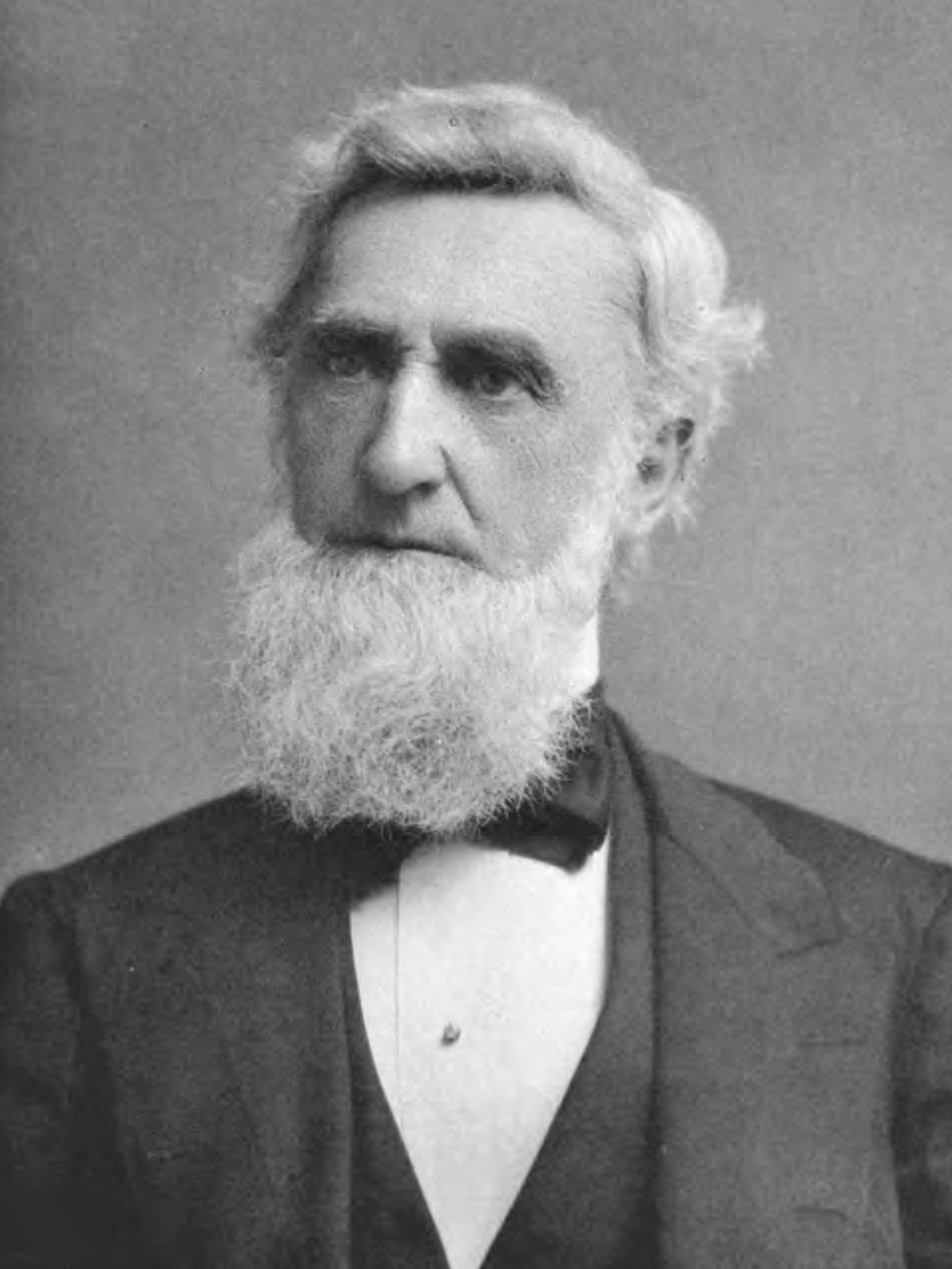
- Welker in 1889

Judge of the United States District Court for the Northern District of Ohio
- In office November 25, 1873 – June 1, 1889
- Appointed by: Ulysses S. Grant
- Preceded by: Charles Taylor Sherman
- Succeeded by: Augustus J. Ricks

Member of the U.S. House of Representatives from Ohio's 14th district
- In office March 4, 1865 – March 3, 1871
- Preceded by: George Bliss
- Succeeded by: James Monroe

4th Lieutenant Governor of Ohio
- In office January 11, 1858 – January 9, 1860
- Governor: Salmon P. Chase
- Preceded by: Thomas H. Ford
- Succeeded by: Robert C. Kirk

Personal details
- Born: Martin Welker; April 25, 1819 Knox County, Ohio, U.S.
- Died: March 15, 1902 (aged 82) Wooster, Ohio, U.S.
- Resting place: Wooster Cemetery; Wooster, Ohio
- Party: Whig; Republican
- Education: read law
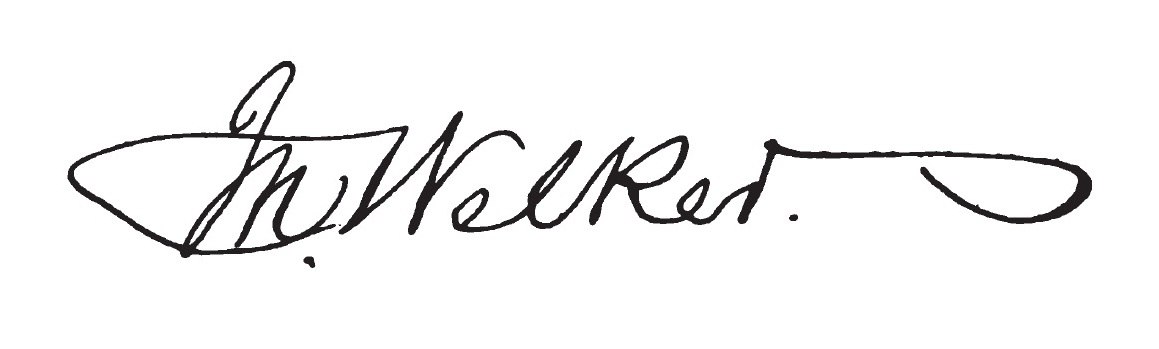
- Signature

Martin Welker (April 25, 1819 – March 15, 1902) was an American politician and judge who was a U.S. representative from Ohio for three terms from 1865 to 1871 and a district judge of the United States District Court for the Northern District of Ohio from 1873 to 1889.

== Education and career ==
Welker was born on April 25, 1819, in Knox County, Ohio. His father was an immigrant from the German Confederation and an early European pioneer in Ohio. Welker left the family farm at the age of 14 to take a job as a clerk in a store in Millersburg, Ohio. He attended the common schools and read law in 1840. He was admitted to the bar and entered private practice in Millersburg from 1840 to 1846. He was clerk of the Holmes County, Ohio, Court of Common Pleas from 1846 to 1851. In 1848, Welker was the Whig nominee for the 31st United States Congress, but lost in the largely Democratic district. In 1850, he again was offered the nomination, but declined it. He resumed private practice in Millersburg from 1851 to 1852. He was an unsuccessful candidate for election to the 33rd United States Congress in 1852. He was a Judge of the Ohio Court of Common Pleas for the Sixth Judicial District from 1852 to 1857. He resumed private practice in Wooster, Ohio in 1857. He was elected the fourth lieutenant governor of Ohio and president of the Ohio Senate in the Fifty-third General Assembly, serving from 1857 to 1858, elected on the ticket with Governor of Ohio Salmon P. Chase. He was a Colonel in the United States Army from 1861 to 1865, during the American Civil War.

=== Civil War service ===
With the outbreak of the American Civil War, on May 14, 1861, Welker was appointed judge-advocate of the second brigade of the Ohio Volunteer Militia at rank of major and served with General Jacob Dolson Cox. Welker was appointed as an aide-de-camp, with rank of colonel to the Governor of Ohio on August 10, 1861. He then served as Judge Advocate General of the State of Ohio for the balance of 1861 and was the superintendent of drafting under Governor David Tod, commencing August 15, 1862. He served as assistant adjutant general in 1862. Welker enlisted on February 16, 1865 in the Union Army as a private in Company I, 188th Ohio Volunteer Infantry. He was mustered out September 21, 1865.

== Congressional service ==
Welker was an unsuccessful candidate for election in 1862 to the 38th United States Congress. He was elected as a Republican from Ohio's 14th congressional district to the United States House of Representatives of the 39th, 40th and 41st United States Congresses, serving from March 4, 1865, to March 3, 1871. He was not a candidate for renomination to the 42nd United States Congress in 1870.

== Federal judicial service ==
Welker received a recess appointment from President Ulysses S. Grant on November 25, 1873, to a seat on the United States District Court for the Northern District of Ohio vacated by Judge Charles Taylor Sherman. He was nominated to the same position by President Grant on December 2, 1873. He was confirmed by the United States Senate on December 8, 1873, and received his commission the same day. His service terminated on June 1, 1889, due to his retirement.

== Other service ==
Concurrent with his federal judicial service, Welker was a Professor of political science and international law at the College of Wooster from 1873 to 1890. He also served as President of the Wooster National Bank, Vice President of the Wayne County Fair Board, and member of the Grand Army of the Republic.

== Death ==
Welker died on March 15, 1902, in Wooster. He was interred in Wooster Cemetery.

== Family ==
Welker married Maria Armour of Millersburg on March 4, 1841. After she died, he married Flora Uhl of Cleveland, Ohio, on January 16, 1896.

== Sources ==
- United States Congress. "Martin Welker (id: W000270)". Biographical Directory of the United States Congress.
- "Welker, Martin – Federal Judicial Center". www.fjc.gov.
- Ohio General Assembly (1917). Manual of legislative practice in the General Assembly. State of Ohio.
- Smith, Joseph P, ed. (1898). History of the Republican Party in Ohio. Vol. I. Chicago: the Lewis Publishing Company.
- Smith, Joseph P, ed. (1898). History of the Republican Party in Ohio. Vol. II. Chicago: the Lewis Publishing Company.
- Reed, George Irving; Randall, Emilius Oviatt; Greve, Charles Theodore, eds. (1897). Bench and Bar of Ohio: a Compendium of History and Biography. Vol. 1. Chicago: Century Publishing and Engraving Company.

Political offices
Preceded by Thomas H. Ford	Lieutenant Governor of Ohio; 1858–1860	Succeeded by Robert C. Kirk
U.S. House of Representatives
Preceded by George Bliss	Member of the U.S. House of Representatives from Ohio's 14th congressional district 1865–1871	Succeeded by James Monroe
Legal offices
Preceded by Charles Taylor Sherman	Judge of the United States District Court for the Northern District of Ohio; 1873–1889	Succeeded by Augustus J. Ricks
