= Jacob Mueller =

American politician

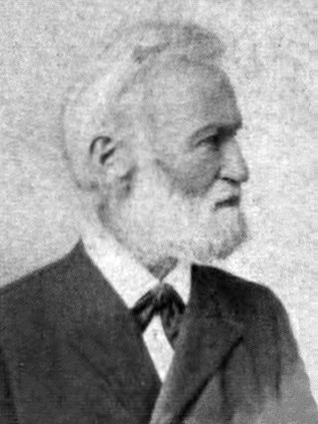

10th Lieutenant Governor of Ohio
- In office January 8, 1872 – January 12, 1874
- Governor: Edward Follansbee Noyes
- Preceded by: John C. Lee
- Succeeded by: Alphonso Hart

Personal details
- Born: March 9, 1822 Alsenz, Rheinpfalz, Bavaria
- Died: August 31, 1905 (aged 83) Cleveland, Ohio, U.S.
- Resting place: Woodland Cemetery, Cleveland
- Party: Republican; Democratic
- Spouse(s): Charlotte Finger; Laura Schmidt
- Children: four

Jacob Mueller (March 9, 1822 – August 31, 1905) was an American politician who served as the tenth lieutenant governor of Ohio from 1872 to 1874.

== Biography ==
Jacob Mueller was born in Alsenz, Kingdom of Bavaria in 1822, and studied Jurisprudence. He practiced law until 1859 when he originated and established the German Insurance Company for which he was Superintendent until 1869 when he resigned and returned to law. In 1849 he participated in the revolution in that country, and served for a short time as Chief Commissary, or Governor of his home district. He was compelled to leave the country, and emigrated to Cleveland, Ohio. He was naturalized, and affiliated with the Republican Party.

== Career ==
Mueller studied law with Willey & Carey in 1850 through 1851; and was admitted to the bar in 1854. He was elected to City Council. He studied law and was admitted to the bar. He was elected lieutenant governor in 1871, and served one term. He afterward became a member of the Democratic Party.

== Death ==
Muller died in 1905 and was buried at Woodland Cemetery in Cleveland, Ohio.

Political offices
Preceded by John C. Lee	Lieutenant Governor of Ohio; 1872-1874	Succeeded by Alphonso Hart
