= Charles H. Lewis =

American politician

Charles Hendrickson Lewis
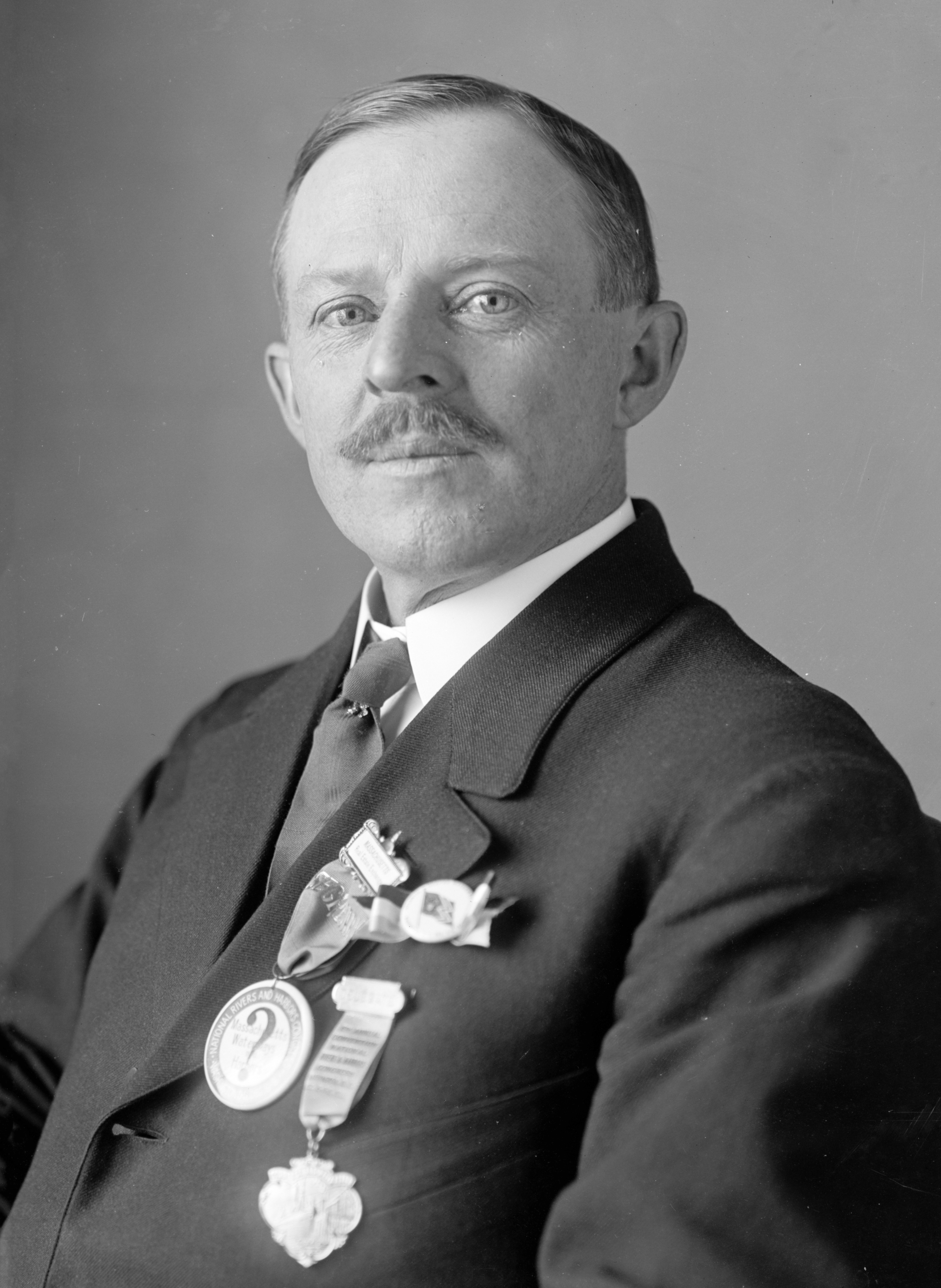

38th Lieutenant Governor of Ohio
- In office January 12, 1925 – January 10, 1927
- Governor: A. Victor Donahey
- Preceded by: Earl D. Bloom
- Succeeded by: Earl D. Bloom

Personal details
- Born: April 25, 1871 Wyandot County, Ohio
- Died: January 2, 1965 (aged 93) Upper Sandusky, Ohio
- Resting place: Oak Hill Cemetery, Upper Sandusky, Ohio
- Party: Republican
- Spouse: Frances Evelyn Sears
- Children: one
- Education: Ohio Northern University; Ohio Wesleyan University

Charles Hendrickson Lewis (April 25, 1871 – January 2, 1965) was an American politician who served as the 38th lieutenant governor of Ohio from 1925 to 1927.

== Biography ==
Charles Hendrickson Lewis was born April 25, 1871, at Egypt, Pitt Township, Wyandot County, Ohio. His father organized and was manager of the Harpster Bank in Harpster, Ohio. Charles' mother died when he was three years old, and he grew up in Harpster, attending the public schools. He graduated from the music department of Ohio Northern University in 1889. He was a trustee of the university, and was awarded an honorary degree in 1927. He taught school for two years, and entered Ohio Wesleyan University. He graduated Bachelor of Science in 1895, and worked in his father's bank for thirty years until 1925.

Lewis was elected lieutenant governor of Ohio in 1924. At that time, the governor and the lieutenant governor were elected separately, and Lewis (a Republican) served with Democratic Governor A. Victor Donahey. They got along amicably, and Lewis represented the state at the inauguration of Calvin Coolidge in 1925. He was also dispatched to lead an official inspection of the locks and dams of the Ohio River.

Lewis was president of the school board in Harpster for 25 years, and president of the county board of education for ten years. He also was president of the Lewis Bank and Trust Company in Upper Sandusky, Ohio, and owned the company that published the Daily Union in Wyandot County. He farmed more than 1000 acres, raising Shorthorn cattle and Poland China Hogs.

Lewis also ran Lewis Systems Inc., a research organization in Columbus, Ohio, and had more than seventy United States patents for treatment of polluted water.

Lewis was a Mason, an Odd Fellow, a Phi Delta Theta, and Kiwanis. He was married June 30, 1896, to Frances E. Sears, who died in 1932. Their child died the day he was born. Charles Lewis died in 1965, and is interred at Oak Hill Cemetery in Upper Sandusky, Ohio.

Political offices
Preceded by Earl D. Bloom	Lieutenant Governor of Ohio; 1925–1927	Succeeded by Earl D. Bloom
