= Ohio Seventh District Court of Appeals =

State court in Ohio, US

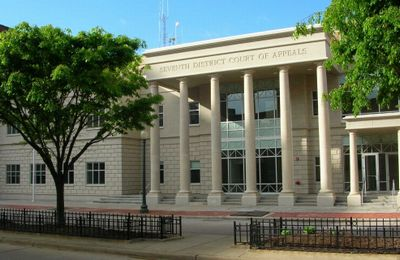
- The Ohio Seventh District Court of Appeals Building
- Established: 1912
- Location: Youngstown, Ohio
- Composition method: Election
- Authorised by: Ohio Constitution of 1851 and Ohio Revised Code Chapter 2501
- Appeals to: Supreme Court of Ohio
- Judge term length: Six Years
- Number of positions: Four
- Website: http://www.seventh.courts.state.oh.us/

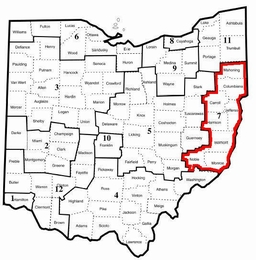
Counties Comprising Seventh District Outlined in Red

The Ohio Seventh District Court of Appeals is one of the twelve Ohio District Courts of Appeal, the state intermediate appellate courts of Ohio. It has jurisdiction over eight counties: Belmont, Carroll, Columbiana, Harrison, Jefferson, Mahoning, Monroe, and Noble.

When a lower court in one of those eight counties has issued a final appealable order, the parties generally have the right to one appeal to the court of appeals. A further appeal may be attempted to the Ohio Supreme Court (which has discretionary jurisdiction and elects to hear a comparably small number of cases).

== Judges ==
The Seventh District Court of Appeals is composed of four judges, each elected to six-year terms by the citizens of the eight counties in the district. Ohio Law requires that a person running for election as an appellate judge must have been licensed as an attorney in Ohio for at least six years or have served as a judge in any jurisdiction for at least six years. The current judges of the court (as of October 2022) are:

Judge (party)	Joined Court	Term ends
Mark A. Hanni (R)	February 9, 2023	February 8, 2029
Cheryl L. Waite (D)	February 10, 1997	February 9, 2027
Carol Ann Robb (R)	February 9, 2015	February 8, 2027
Katelyn Dickey (R)	April 10, 2024	February 8, 2025

Each case on appeal is decided by a panel of three judges. Cases are decided through a review of the record of the inferior court or tribunal, as informed by the briefs submitted by the parties and by oral argument (if requested by either party). New evidence is not permitted to be introduced on appeal.

== Seventh District Court of Appeals Building ==
In June 2006, the Seventh District Court of Appeals unveiled a new courthouse in downtown Youngstown, Ohio. From 1912 until 2006 the court had been located nearby on the fourth floor of the Mahoning County Courthouse. The Court address is 131 West Federal Street, Youngstown, Ohio 44503.
