= 188th Brigade =

188th Brigade may refer to:

== China ==
- 188th Mechanized Infantry Brigade (People's Republic of China)

== Israel ==
- 188th Armored Brigade

== United Kingdom ==
- 188th Brigade (United Kingdom)
- 188th (2/1st Northumberland) Brigade, a British infantry brigade in World War I
- CLXXXVIII Brigade, Royal Field Artillery, a unit of 40th Division (United Kingdom) in World War I

== United States ==
- 188th Infantry Brigade (United States), an infantry training brigade

== See also ==
- 188th Regiment (disambiguation)
