= 1902 in the United States =

- Decades: 1880s; 1890s; 1900s; 1910s; 1920s
- See also: History of the United States (1865–1918); Timeline of United States history (1900–1929); List of years in the United States

Events from the year 1902 in the United States.

== Incumbents ==
=== Federal government ===
- President: Theodore Roosevelt (R-New York)
- Vice President: vacant
- Chief Justice: Melville Fuller (Illinois)
- Speaker of the House of Representatives: David B. Henderson (R-Iowa)
- Congress: 57th

==== State governments ====
Governors and lieutenant governors

=== Governors ===
- Governor of Alabama: William D. Jelks (Democratic)
- Governor of Arkansas: Jeff Davis (Democratic)
- Governor of California: Henry Gage (Republican)
- Governor of Colorado: James Bradley Orman (Democratic)
- Governor of Connecticut: George P. McLean (Republican)
- Governor of Delaware: John Hunn (Republican)
- Governor of Florida: William Sherman Jennings (Democratic)
- Governor of Georgia: Allen D. Candler (Democratic) (until October 25), Joseph M. Terrell (Democratic) (starting October 25)
- Governor of Idaho: Frank W. Hunt (Democratic)
- Governor of Illinois: Richard Yates, Jr. (Republican)
- Governor of Indiana: Winfield T. Durbin (Republican)
- Governor of Iowa: Leslie M. Shaw (Republican) (until January 16), Albert B. Cummins (Republican) (starting January 16)
- Governor of Kansas: William E. Stanley (Republican)
- Governor of Kentucky: J. C. W. Beckham (Democratic)
- Governor of Louisiana: William Wright Heard (Democratic)
- Governor of Maine: John Fremont Hill (Republican)
- Governor of Maryland: John Walter Smith (Democratic)
- Governor of Massachusetts: Winthrop Murray Crane (Republican)
- Governor of Michigan: Aaron T. Bliss (Republican)
- Governor of Minnesota: Samuel Rinnah Van Sant (Republican)
- Governor of Mississippi: Andrew H. Longino (Democratic)
- Governor of Missouri: Alexander Monroe Dockery (Democratic)
- Governor of Montana: Joseph Toole (Democratic)
- Governor of Nebraska: Ezra P. Savage (Republican)
- Governor of Nevada: Reinhold Sadler (Silver)
- Governor of New Hampshire: Chester B. Jordan (Republican)
- Governor of New Jersey: Foster MacGowan Voorhees (Republican) (until January 21), Franklin Murphy (Republican) (starting January 21)
- Governor of New York: Benjamin Barker Odell, Jr. (Republican)
- Governor of North Carolina: Charles Brantley Aycock (Democratic)
- Governor of North Dakota: Frank White (Republican)
- Governor of Ohio: George K. Nash (Republican)
- Governor of Oregon: T. T. Geer (Republican)
- Governor of Pennsylvania: William A. Stone (Republican)
- Governor of Rhode Island: Charles D. Kimball (Republican)
- Governor of South Carolina: Miles Benjamin McSweeney (Democratic)
- Governor of South Dakota: Charles N. Herreid (Republican)
- Governor of Tennessee: Benton McMillin (Democratic)
- Governor of Texas: Joseph D. Sayers (Democratic)
- Governor of Utah: Heber Manning Wells (Republican)
- Governor of Vermont: William W. Stickney (Republican) (until October 3), John G. McCullough (Republican) (starting October 3)
- Governor of Virginia: James Hoge Tyler (Democratic) (until January 1), Andrew Jackson Montague (Democratic) (starting January 1)
- Governor of Washington: Henry McBride (Republican)
- Governor of West Virginia: Albert B. White (Republican)
- Governor of Wisconsin: Robert M. La Follette, Sr. (Republican)
- Governor of Wyoming: DeForest Richards (Republican)

=== Lieutenant governors ===
- Lieutenant Governor of California: Jacob H. Neff (Republican)
- Lieutenant Governor of Colorado: David Courtney Coates (Democratic)
- Lieutenant Governor of Connecticut: Edwin O. Keeler (Republican)
- Lieutenant Governor of Delaware: Philip L. Cannon (Republican)
- Lieutenant Governor of Idaho: Thomas F. Terrell (Democratic)
- Lieutenant Governor of Illinois: William Northcott (Republican)
- Lieutenant Governor of Indiana: Newton W. Gilbert (Republican)
- Lieutenant Governor of Iowa: James C. Milliman (Republican) (until January 16), John Herriott (Republican) (starting January 16)
- Lieutenant Governor of Kansas: Harry E. Richter (Republican)
- Lieutenant Governor of Kentucky: vacant
- Lieutenant Governor of Louisiana: Albert Estopinal (Democratic)
- Lieutenant Governor of Massachusetts: John L. Bates (Republican)
- Lieutenant Governor of Michigan: Orrin W. Robinson (Republican)
- Lieutenant Governor of Minnesota: Lyndon A. Smith (Republican)
- Lieutenant Governor of Mississippi: James T. Harrison (Democratic)
- Lieutenant Governor of Missouri: John Adams Lee (Democratic)
- Lieutenant Governor of Montana: Frank G. Higgins (Democratic)
- Lieutenant Governor of Nebraska: vacant
- Lieutenant Governor of Nevada: James R. Judge (political party unknown)
- Lieutenant Governor of New York: Timothy L. Woodruff (Republican) (until end of December 31)
- Lieutenant Governor of North Carolina: Wilfred D. Turner (Democratic)
- Lieutenant Governor of North Dakota: David Bartlett (Republican)
- Lieutenant Governor of Ohio:
  - until January 13: John A. Caldwell (Republican)
  - January 13-May 1: Carl L. Nippert (Republican)
  - May 1-June 26: vacant
  - starting June 26: Harry L. Gordon (Republican)
- Lieutenant Governor of Pennsylvania: John P. S. Gobin (Republican)
- Lieutenant Governor of Rhode Island: vacant (until February 18), George L. Shepley (Republican) (starting February 18)
- Lieutenant Governor of South Carolina: James H. Tillman (Democratic)
- Lieutenant Governor of South Dakota: George W. Snow (Republican)
- Lieutenant Governor of Tennessee: Newton H. White (Democratic)
- Lieutenant Governor of Texas: James Browning (Democratic)
- Lieutenant Governor of Vermont: Martin F. Allen (Republican) (until October 3), Zed S. Stanton (Republican) (starting October 3)
- Lieutenant Governor of Virginia: Edward Echols (Democratic) (until month and day unknown), Joseph Edward Willard (Democratic) (starting month and day unknown)
- Lieutenant Governor of Washington: vacant
- Lieutenant Governor of Wisconsin: Jesse Stone (Republican) (until May 11), vacant (starting May 11)

== Events ==
=== January–March ===
- January 3
  - The first college football bowl game, the Rose Bowl between Michigan and Stanford, is held in Pasadena, California.
  - Nathan Stubblefield demonstrates his wireless telephone device in Kentucky.
- January 8 – A train collision in the New York Central Railroad's Park Avenue Tunnel kills 17, injures 38, and leads to increased demand for electric trains.
- January 28 – The Carnegie Institution is founded in Washington, D.C., to promote scientific research with a $10 million gift from Andrew Carnegie.
- February 9 – Fire levels 26 city blocks of Jersey City, New Jersey.
- February 18 – U.S. President Roosevelt prosecutes the Northern Securities Company for violation of the antitrust Sherman Act.
- February 22 – Senators Benjamin Tillman and John L. McLaurin, both Democrats of South Carolina, have a fist fight while Congress is in session. Both Tillman and McLaurin are censured by the Senate on February 28.
- February – A commission on yellow fever announces that the disease is carried by mosquitoes.
- March 10 – A Circuit Court decision ends Thomas Edison's monopoly on 35 mm movie film technology.
- March 22 – International Harvester formed by merger of the McCormick Harvesting Machine Company, Deering Harvester Company and other companies.

=== April–June ===
- April 2 – The Electric Theatre, the first movie theater in the United States, opens in Los Angeles, California.
- April 7 – The Texas Oil Company Texaco is founded.
- April 14 – The first J. C. Penney department store opens in Kemmerer, Wyoming.
- May 15 – It is claimed that in a field outside Grass Valley, California, Lyman Gilmore achieves flight in a powered airplane (a steam-powered glider). There is no surviving evidence to verify this claim.
- May 20 – Cuba gains independence from the United States.
- May 22 – Crater Lake National Park is established in Oregon.
- June 2 – The coal strike of 1902 begins in the anthracite coalfields of eastern Pennsylvania.
- June 13 – Minnesota Mining and Manufacturing, predecessor of global consumer goods brand 3M, begins trading as a mining venture at Two Harbors.
- June 15 – The New York Central railroad inaugurates the 20th Century Limited passenger train between Chicago and Grand Central Terminal in New York City.
- June 17 – The Newlands Reclamation Act funds irrigation projects for the arid lands of 17 states in the American West.
- June 23 – Nurse Jane Toppan is convicted on 12 counts of murder (she admits to 31) in Massachusetts but is found not guilty by reason of insanity and committed for life.
- June 24 – Target Corporation, the department store chain, is founded.

=== July–September ===
- July 1 – The Philippine Organic Act becomes law, providing that the lower house of the Philippine legislature will be elected after the insurrection ends.
- July 2 – The Philippine–American War ends.
- July 8 – The United States Bureau of Reclamation is established within the U.S. Geological Survey.
- July 10 – The Rolling Mill Mine disaster in Johnstown, Pennsylvania kills 112 miners.
- July 17 – Willis Carrier devises air conditioning in New York City.
- July 22 – Felix Pedro discovers gold in modern-day Fairbanks, Alaska.
- August 22 – Theodore Roosevelt becomes the first American president to ride in an automobile, a Columbia Electric Victoria through Hartford, Connecticut.
- September 19 – Shiloh Baptist Church stampede: 115 people are killed in a crush at a black church in Birmingham, Alabama, following a mistaken alarm of fire after an address by Booker T. Washington.

=== October–December ===
- October 21 – A 5-month strike by the United Mine Workers ends.
- October 24 – Delta Zeta sorority is founded at Miami University in Oxford, Ohio.
- November 2 – William D. Jelks is elected the 32nd governor of Alabama defeating John A. W. Smith.
- November 16 – A newspaper cartoon depicting President "Teddy" Roosevelt refusing to shoot a bear cub inspires creation of the first teddy bear by Morris Michtom in New York City.
- November 30 – On the American frontier, the second-in-command of Butch Cassidy's Wild Bunch, Harvey Logan ("Kid Curry"), is captured after a shootout with lawmen in Knoxville, Tennessee. He is sentenced to a $5,000 fine and 20 years hard labor for robbery but escapes custody in 1903.
- December – The Venezuela Crisis of 1902–1903 occurs (until February 1903), in which Britain, Germany and Italy sustain a naval blockade on Venezuela in order to enforce collection of outstanding financial claims. This prompts the development of the Roosevelt Corollary to the Monroe Doctrine.

=== Undated ===
- The Potawatomi Zoo in South Bend, Indiana, begins as a duck pond.
- The First Goodwill Industries Store is opened in Boston, Massachusetts by Rev. Edgar J. Helms of Morgan Methodist Chapel.

=== Ongoing ===
- Progressive Era (1890s–1920s)
- Lochner era (c. 1897–c. 1937)
- Philippine–American War (1899–1902)

== Births ==
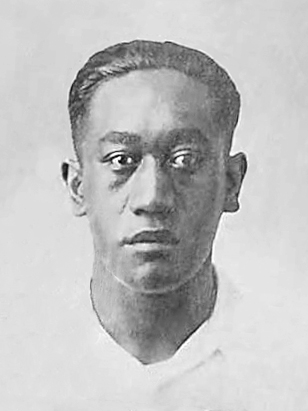
Pua Kealoha

- January 4 – John A. McCone, CIA Director from 1961 to 1965 (died 1991)
- January 9 – Ann Nixon Cooper, African-American civil rights activist (died 2009)
- January 19 – Marjorie Daw, actress (died 1979)
- January 24 – E. A. Speiser, biblical scholar (died 1965)
- February 6 – George Brunies, jazz trombonist (died 1974)
- February 13 – Blair Moody, U.S. Senator from Michigan from 1951 to 1952 (died 1954)
- February 19
  - Kay Boyle, writer (died 1992)
  - Eddie Peabody, musician (died 1970)
- February 27
  - Ethelda Bleibtrey, Olympic swimmer (died 1978)
  - John Steinbeck, novelist (died 1968)
- March 4 – Russell Reeder, soldier and author (d. 1998)
- March 16 – Leon Roppolo, jazz clarinetist (died 1943)
- March 17 – Bobby Jones, amateur golfer (died 1971)
- March 21 – Al Smith, cartoonist (died 1986)
- March 23 – Philip Ober, actor (died 1982)
- March 24 – Thomas E. Dewey, 47th Governor of New York, 1948 Republican presidential nominee (died 1971)
- April 11 – Quentin Reynolds, journalist (died 1965)
- April 2 – David Worth Clark, U.S. Senator from Idaho from 1939 to 1945 (died 1955)
- April 27 – Harry Stockwell, actor and singer (died 1984)
- May 6 – Harry Golden, Ukrainian-born American journalist (died 1981)
- May 11 – Dick Curtis, actor (died 1952)
- May 15 – Richard J. Daley, Mayor of Chicago from 1956 (died 1976)
- May 21 – Earl Averill, baseball player (died 1983)
- May 24 – Wilbur Hatch, composer (died 1969)
- May 27 – Gladys Pearl Baker, née Monroe, film editor and mother of actress Marilyn Monroe (died 1984)
- June 2
  - James T. Berryman, political cartoonist (died 1971)
  - Rosa Rio, organist and composer (died 2010)
- June 7 – Hope Summers, screen character actress (died 1979)
- June 25 – Ralph Erickson, baseball pitcher (died 2002)
- July 4
  - Vince Barnett, actor (died 1977)
  - George Murphy, U.S. Senator from California from 1965 to 1971 (died 1992)
- July 7
  - Richard Barrett Lowe, governor of Guam and American Samoa (died 1972)
  - Ted Radcliffe, baseball player (died 2005)
- July 16 – Andrew L. Stone, screenwriter, director and producer (died 1999)
- July 21 – Joseph Kesselring, playwright (died 1967)
- July 31 – Randolph Edgar Haugan, author, editor and publisher (died 1985)
- August 1 – Harold D. Schuster, film director (died 1986)
- August 4 – Clara Peller, actress (died 1987)
- August 18 – Margaret Murie, environmentalist and author
- August 22 – Omer Poos, United States district judge from 1958 to 1976 (died 1976)
- September 7 – Roy Barcroft, actor (died 1969)
- October 3 – Waldo McBurney, America's oldest worker (died 2009)
- October 5 – Ray Kroc, businessman, founder of McDonald's (died 1984)
- October 13 – Arna Wendell Bontemps, writer (died 1973)
- October 21 – Eddy Hamel, soccer player (d. 1943 in Auschwitz)
- October 25 – Henry Steele Commager, historian (died 1998)
- November 14 – Pua Kealoha, Olympic swimmer (died 1989)
- November 19 – Trevor Bardette, actor (died 1977)
- November 23 – Aaron Bank, colonel (died 2004)
- December 5 – Strom Thurmond, 103rd Governor of South Carolina (died 2003)
- December 8 – Oswald Jacoby, bridge player (died 1984)
- December 9 – Margaret Hamilton, actress (died 1985)
- December 14 – Frances Bavier, stage and television actress (died 1989)
- December 15 – Bernard L. Austin, admiral (died 1979)
- December 23 – Norman Maclean, author (died 1990)
- December 27 – Carman Maxwell, animator and voice actor (died 1987)
- December 28 – Mortimer Adler, philosopher (died 2001)

== Deaths ==
- January 15 – Alpheus Hyatt, zoologist and paleontologist (born 1838)
- February 18 – Charles Lewis Tiffany, founder of Tiffany & Co. (born 1812)
- March 12 – John Peter Altgeld, 20th Governor of Illinois (born 1847)
- March 14 – Daniel H. Reynolds, Confederate Brigadier General (born 1832)
- April 3 – Esther Hobart Morris, first women justice of the peace in the United States (born 1814)
- April 27 – Julius Sterling Morton, 3rd United States Secretary of Agriculture (born 1832)
- May 5 – Bret Harte, short-story writer and poet (born 1836)
- May 26 – Almon Brown Strowger, inventor (born 1839)
- June 5 – Louis J. Weichmann, chief witness for the prosecution in the trial of the assassins of Abraham Lincoln (born 1842)
- July 27 – Packy Dillon, baseball player (born 1853)
- August 10 – James McMillan, Canadian-born U.S. Senator from Michigan from 1889 to 1902 (born 1838)
- September 26 – Levi Strauss, founder of Levi Strauss & Co. (born 1829)
- October 26 – Elizabeth Cady Stanton, suffragist (born 1815)
- November 22 – Walter Reed, Army physician (born 1851)
- November 27 – George S. Cook, prominent early American photographer (born 1819)
- November 29 – John Elliott Ward, politician and diplomat (born 1814)
- December 4 – Charles Dow, founder of Dow Jones & Company and The Wall Street Journal (born 1851)
- December 7 – Thomas Nast, political cartoonist (born 1840)
- December 14 – Julia Grant, First Lady of the United States (born 1826)
- December 22 – Dwight M. Sabin, U.S. Senator from Minnesota from 1883 to 1889 (born 1843)
- December 26 – Mary Hartwell Catherwood, author and poet (born 1849)

== See also ==
- List of American films of 1902
- Timeline of United States history (1900–1929)
