= Avondale, Cincinnati =

Coordinates: 39°8′52″N 84°29′42″W

Avondale
- Neighborhood of Cincinnati
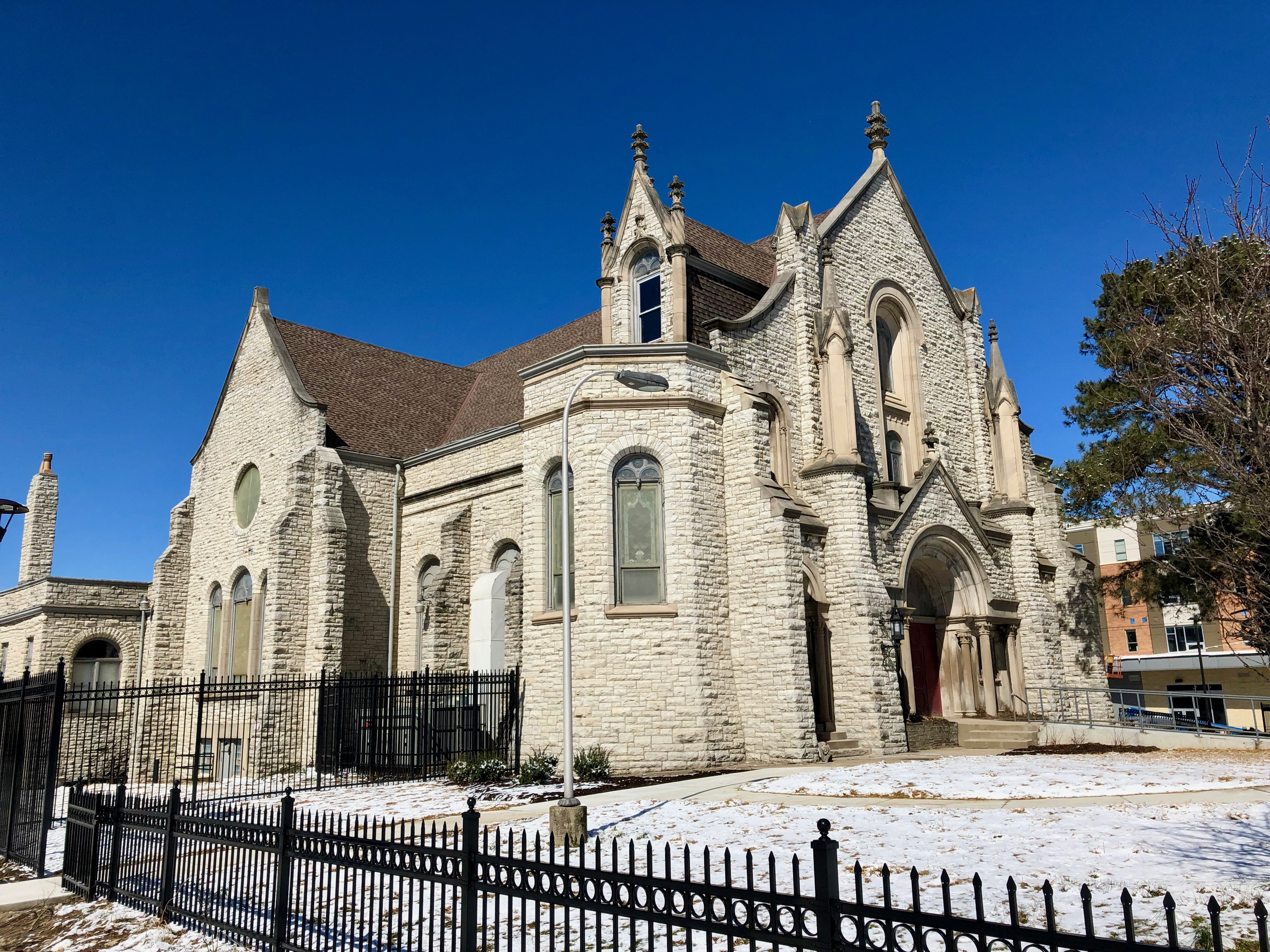
- Carmel Presbyterian Church, Avondale

- Flag

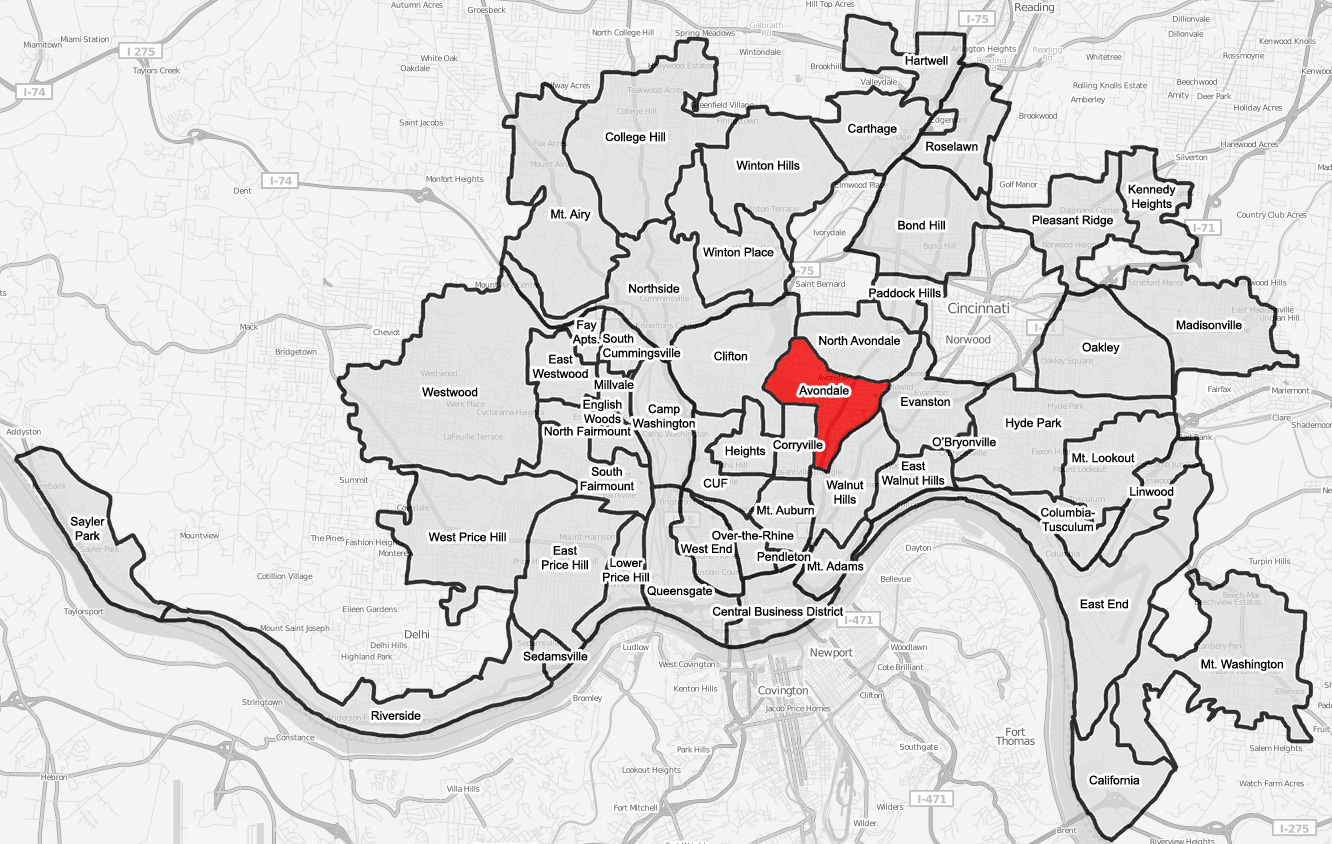
- Avondale (red) within Cincinnati, Ohio
- Country: United States
- State: Ohio
- County: Hamilton
- City: Cincinnati

Population (2020)
  - Total: 11,345
- ZIP code: 45229

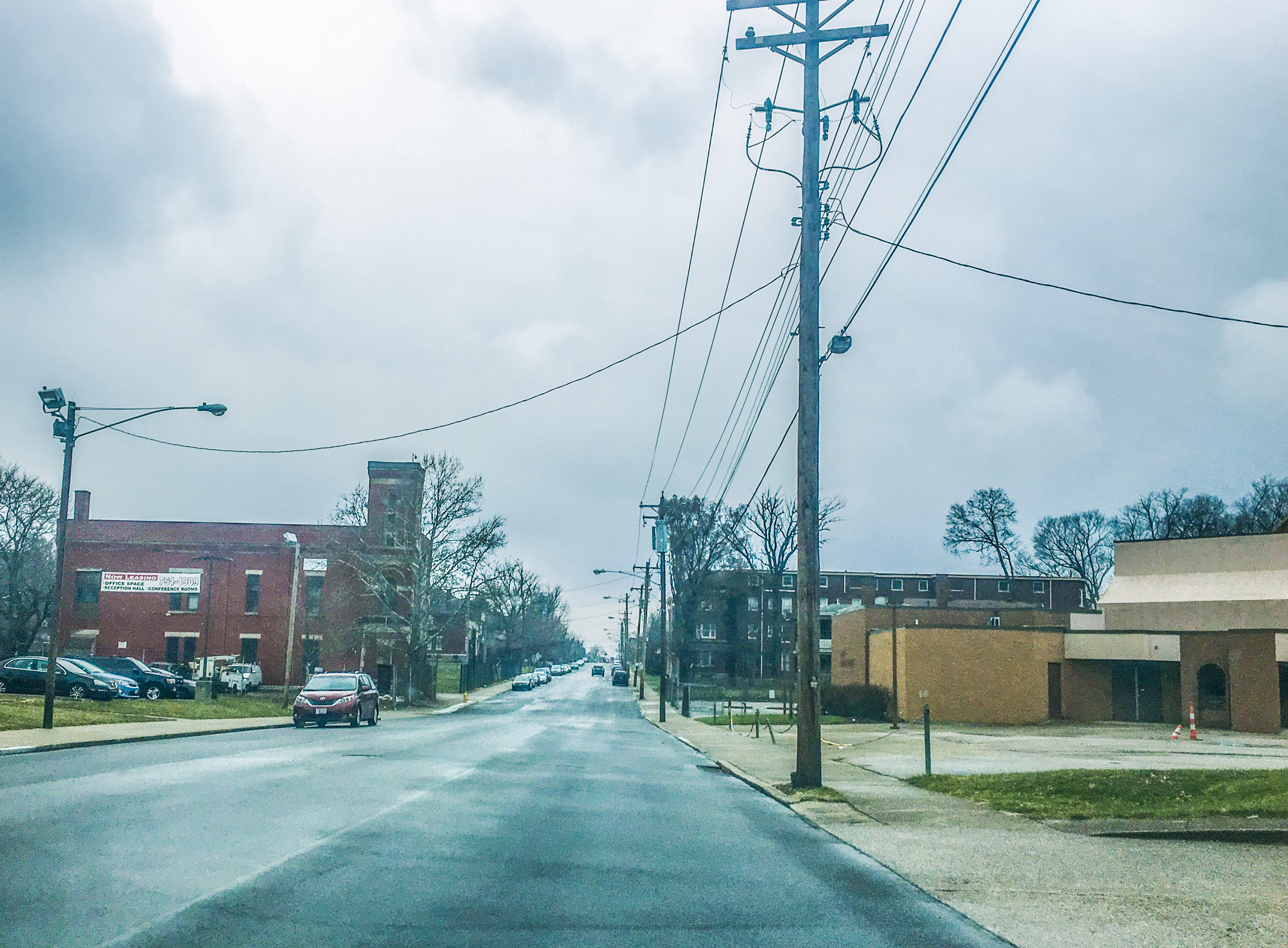
Rockdale Avenue, Avondale, March 2019

Avondale is one of the 52 neighborhoods of Cincinnati, Ohio. It is home to the Cincinnati Zoo and Botanical Garden. The population was 11,345 at the 2020 census.

Originally a suburb, Avondale was annexed in 1896. The neighborhood became a majority Jewish neighborhood in the early 20th century, and then became a majority African American community mid-century as a result of urban renewal projects. Two race riots began in Avondale in 1967 and 1968, which were part of the larger Civil Rights Movement and Black Power movement in the United States.

The neighborhood is bordered by North Avondale, Evanston, Walnut Hills, Corryville, and Clifton.

== History ==
During the 19th century, Avondale was a rural suburb. Its settlers were mostly Protestant families from England or Germany. It is claimed that the wife of Stephen Burton, a wealthy ironworks owner, began calling the area Avondale in 1853 after she saw a resemblance between the stream behind her house and the Avon River in England. It was incorporated on July 27, 1864, by Daniel Collier, Seth Evans and Joe C. Moores.

Between the 1870s and 1890s, the community was plagued by burglaries, vagrants, public drunkenness, and brawling. Avondale was annexed by the City of Cincinnati in 1896. After streetcar lines were laid, less affluent residents settled in the neighborhood; from 1920 until after World War II, 60% of Avondale was Jewish. It remained a closed neighborhood until the construction of the Millcreek Expressway in the 1940s, which displaced residents from the Black West End neighborhood. At that time, realtors only permitted Black families to move into neighborhoods which already had a Black population, and Avondale had had Black residents since the mid-nineteenth century.

After Black families began relocating to Avondale, it split into two increasingly distinct and separate North and South neighborhoods. The residents of North Avondale were able to maintain the value of their property and the character of their streets. The rest of Avondale became known for its rising crime rate, falling land values, and deteriorating housing. Absentee landlords neglected their properties and tenants often abused the buildings. By 1956, the city identified Avondale as blighted and tried to rehabilitate it, with the work from 1965 and 1975 benefitting institutions such as the University of Cincinnati and nearby hospitals. The city promised to improve the housing situation, but broke that promise by instead enacting widespread demolition for street improvements, parking, and institutional expansion, which reduced the amount of available housing.

=== Riots of 1967 ===
1967 Cincinnati riots
- Part of Long, hot summer of 1967
- Date: June 12–15, 1967
- Location: Cincinnati, Ohio

Parties
Rioters	Ohio; Ohio National Guard; Cincinnati; Cincinnati Police Department

Casualties
- Death: 1
- Injuries: 63
- Arrested: 404

The 1967 riots began on June 12 and lasted several days. They were just one of 159 riots that swept cities in the United States during the "Long Hot Summer of 1967".

In May 1967, Posteal Laskey Jr. was convicted as the Cincinnati Strangler. He was accused of raping and murdering six women, and the jury's decision was considered controversial. On June 11, Peter Frakes, Laskey's cousin, picketed with a sign that read, "Cincinnati Guilty-Laskey Innocent!" Frakes was arrested by police for exercising his First Amendment rights. Incensed Black community leaders held a protest meeting on June 12 at the Abraham Lincoln statue on the corner of Reading and Rockdale Roads. Some people broke away from the riot in order to damage property.

In Avondale some of the rioters smashed, looted, damaged cars, buildings, and stores. A witness reported, "there's not a window left on Reading Road or Burnett Avenue. The youths are doing it and adults are standing by and laughing. All ages are active. Women could be seen carrying babies." The rioting spread from Avondale to Bond Hill, Winton Terrace, Walnut Hills, Corryville, Clifton, West End, and Downtown. A 15-year-old boy was critically wounded in front of a fire station that was being fired upon by a car full of rioters. According to an Avondale resident, rioting was over the constant police harassment, lack of jobs, and shopkeepers "jacking up prices and selling bad products."

Governor James A. Rhodes ordered 700 Ohio National Guardsmen into Cincinnati to halt the rioters. The National Guard patrolled the streets in jeeps, armed with machine guns. Rioters avoided these armed forces as the Guardsmen were given the order to kill if they were fired upon. By June 15, when the riot had been stopped, one person was dead, 63 injured, 404 had been arrested, and the city had incurred $2 million in property damage.

The day before the riots began, Martin Luther King Jr. visited Zion Baptist Church in Avondale and preached a doctrine of non-violence.

=== Riots of 1968 ===
Less than a year later, the neighborhood erupted into unrest again. The 1968 riots were in response to the assassination of Martin Luther King Jr. on April 4, 1968. Tension in Avondale had already been high due to a lack of job opportunities for Black men, and the assassination escalated that tension. On April 8, around 1,500 Black community members attended a memorial held at a local recreation center.

An officer of the Congress of Racial Equality blamed white people for King's death and urged the crowd to retaliate. The crowd was orderly when it left the memorial and spilled out into the street. Nearby James Smith, a Black man, attempted to protect a jewelry store while under attack. During the struggle with the attackers, Smith accidentally shot and killed his wife with his own shotgun.

Rioting started after a rumor spread in the crowd that Smith's wife was killed by a police officer. Rioters smashed store windows and looted merchandise. More than 70 fires had been set, several of them major. Eight youths dragged a student, Noel Wright, and his wife from their car in Mount Auburn. Wright was stabbed to death and his wife was beaten.

The next night, the city was put under curfew, and nearly 1,500 National Guardsmen were brought in to subdue the protest. Several days after the riot started, two people were dead, hundreds were arrested, and the city had incurred $3 million in property damage.

After the riots, Black community members were appointed to city boards and commissions. In 1967, none of the 69 board members was Black.

== Demographics ==
Population of Avondale 1900-2020
Year	Pop.	±%
1900	8,208	—
1910	13,120	+59.8%
1920	17,900	+36.4%
1930	27,093	+51.4%
1940	28,769	+6.2%
1950	31,247	+8.6%
1960	35,449	+13.4%
1970	30,118	−15.0%
1980	19,845	−34.1%
1990	18,736	−5.6%
2000	16,298	−13.0%
2010	12,466	−23.5%
2020	11,345	−9.0%
North Avondale and Paddock Hills are within the same census tract from 1900 to 1970. North Avondale was officially designated a neighborhood in the 1970s. Population after 1970 was split from Avondale.

=== 2020 census ===
As of the census of 2020, there were 11,345 people living in the neighborhood. There were 6,410 housing units. The racial makeup of the neighborhood was 11.4% White, 81.4% Black or African American, 0.3% Native American, 0.8% Asian, 0.0% Pacific Islander, 1.4% from some other race, and 4.7% from two or more races. 2.5% of the population were Hispanic or Latino of any race.

There were 5,968 households, out of which 37.2% were families. 51.3% of all households were made up of individuals.

29.9% of the neighborhood's population were under the age of 18, 53.8% were 18 to 64, and 16.3% were 65 years of age or older. 53.5% of the population was male and 46.5% was female.

According to the U.S. Census American Community Survey, for the period 2016-2020 the estimated median annual income for a household in the neighborhood was $24,250. About 32.6% of family households were living below the poverty line. About 19.5% had a bachelor's degree or higher.

== Recreation ==
The 4-acre (1.6 ha) Fleischmann Gardens park was established in 1925 on land donated by the heirs of prominent Avondale resident Charles Louis Fleischmann.

== Education ==
Avondale is served by a branch of the Public Library of Cincinnati and Hamilton County.

South Avondale Elementary serves kindergarten through 6th grade, and is part of the Cincinnati Public Schools system. Phoenix Community Learning center is a public charter school also located in Avondale, serving kindergarten through 10th grade.

Avondale is adjacent to Xavier University and Cincinnati Children's Hospital, and in close proximity to the University of Cincinnati and its medical centers.

== Notable people ==
- Theda Bara, actress
- John Kenneth Blackwell, politician and author
- Don Brodie, actor
- Marguerite Clark, actress
- Levi Coffin, abolitionist
- Alfred M. Cohen, lawyer
- Larry Donald, boxer
- Elizabeth Drew, journalist and author
- Leon Durham, baseball player and coach
- Harry L. Gordon, politician
- Libby Holman, socialite, actress, singer, and activist
- Ban Johnson, baseball executive
- David Justice, baseball player
- Jan-Michele Kearney, businesswoman, attorney, and politician
- Charles Keating, sportsman, lawyer, real estate developer, banker, financier, and convicted felon
- James Levine, conductor and pianist
- Curtis Peagler, jazz saxophonist
- Tuffy Rhodes, baseball player
- Jerry Rubin, social activist
- Arnold Spielberg, electrical engineer
- Evelyn Venable, actress
- Katt Williams, comedian and actor
- Philippé Wynne, singer

== See also ==
- List of incidents of civil unrest in the United States

== Notes ==
- Rucker, Walter C. and James N. Upton (2007), Encyclopedia of American race riots, Greenwood Publishing Group. ISBN 0-313-33301-7
- Stradling, David (2003), Cincinnati: From River City to Highway Metropolis, Arcade Publishing. ISBN 0-7385-2440-9
