= Senator Cohen =

Senator Cohen may refer to:

== Members of the United States Senate ==
- John S. Cohen (1870–1935), U.S. Senator from Georgia from 1932 to 1933
- William Cohen (born 1940), U.S. Senator from Maine from 1979 to 1997

== United States state senate members ==
- Alfred M. Cohen (1859–1949), Ohio State Senate
- Christine Cohen (born 1976), Connecticut State Senate
- Dick Cohen (born 1949), Minnesota State Senate
- Steve Cohen (politician) (born 1949), Tennessee State Senate
