= Julian Morgenstern =

American rabbi and Bible scholar (1881–1976)

4th President of Hebrew Union College
- In office 1921–1947
- Preceded by: Kaufmann Kohler
- Succeeded by: Nelson Glueck

Personal details
- Born: March 18, 1881 St. Francisville, Illinois, U.S.
- Died: December 4, 1976 (aged 95) Macon, Georgia, U.S.
- Spouse: Helen Thorner (m. 1906; died 1960)
- Children: 1
- Education: University of Cincinnati (BA); University of Heidelberg (PhD)

Julian Morgenstern (March 18, 1881 – December 4, 1976) was an American rabbi, Bible scholar, and the 4th President of Hebrew Union College.

== Life ==
Morgenstern was born on March 18, 1881, in St. Francisville, Illinois, the son of Samuel Morgenstern and Hannah Ochs. His parents were German immigrants. He moved with his family to Vincennes, Indiana, when he was two. They stayed there for four years, and after a year in Garden City, Kansas, they settled in Cincinnati, Ohio.

Morgenstern graduated from the University of Cincinnati in 1901 and was ordained a rabbi at Hebrew Union College in 1902. He then spent two years doing post-graduate work in Germany, studying Semitics at the University of Berlin and the University of Heidelberg. He received a Ph.D. from the latter university in 1904. He then returned to America and became rabbi of Congregation Ahaveth Achim (later known as Temple Israel) in Lafayette, Indiana, for the next three years. He then became Professor of Biblical and Semitic Languages at Hebrew Union College, where his systematic and thorough methods made him a successful teacher. When Kaufmann Kohler retired as president of the college in 1921, he became acting president. In 1922, he was elected president, although he continued to teach Bible courses to rabbinical and post-graduate students.

Morgenstern was the first Hebrew Union College alumnus to serve as its president. Under him, the students, faculty, and college activity all grew rapidly. New departments of education, social studies, and Jewish music were established, new buildings were erected, and an endowment fund was created. The college, which was previously part of the Union of American Hebrew Congregations, became independently chartered. The Hebrew Union School of Religious Education was founded in New York City, New York. The Hebrew Union College Annual was established in 1924 and immediately became a prominent publication in Jewish scholarship. He helped a dozen European scholars escape Nazi Germany and bring them to the college. He was originally an anti-Zionist, although he changed his views following the creation of the state of Israel.

While he was studying in Germany, his former classmate Judah Leon Magnes suggested he study Semitic languages. He developed a close relationship with some of his professors on the subject, including Friedrich Delitzsch, Bruno Meissner, Carl Bezold, and Carl Heinrich Becker. He focused on Assyriology in particular, with his dissertation called "The Doctrine of Sin in the Babylonian Religion." His time studying Assyriology inspired him to support Biblical criticism, which he felt was dominated by Christian scholars that dismissed the Jewish perspective. He presented a paper on the subject in the 1915 Central Conference of American Rabbis, which proved controversial and faced strong opposition from older rabbis, but it helped push Reform Judaism and Hebrew Union College to start studying Biblical criticism. His work in Biblical scholarship led him to be president of the American Oriental Society from 1928 to 1929, president of the Society of Biblical Literature and Exegesis in 1941, and one of two American honorary members of the British Society for Old Testament Study.

Morgenstern served as president of Hebrew Union College until 1947 and continued to teach at the college until 1960, at which point he moved to Macon, Georgia. He received an honorary D.H.L. from the Jewish Theological Seminary in 1937 and an honorary D.L. from the University of Cincinnati in 1947. The University of Heidelberg also gave him the unusual honor of renewing his degree in 1954. He was the Bible specialist for the board of editors of the Universal Jewish Encyclopedia. He preferred the term American Judaism over Reform Judaism, considered American Judaism more pragmatic and less dogmatic than earlier Reform Judaism, and believed Reform and Conservative Judaism would ultimately merge. He was secretary of the Central Conference of American Rabbis from 1907 to 1913, president of the Alumni Association of Hebrew Union College from 1916 to 1918, American vice president of the World Union for Progressive Judaism, executive of the Jewish Agency, and a member of the American Academy for Jewish Research, B'nai B'rith, and Theta Phi. In 1906, he married Helen Thorner. They had one child, Jean Greenebaum.

Morgenstern died at a nursing home in Macon, on December 4, 1976. His funeral was held at the Hebrew Union College chapel, with College president Alfred Gottschalk, Dr. Jacob Rader Marcus, Dr. Sheldon H. Blank, and Dr. Samuel Sandmel officiating the service. He was buried in United Jewish Cemetery in Evanston, Cincinnati.
