= United Jewish Cemetery =

Jewish cemetery in Evanston, Cincinnati, Ohio, US

Coordinates: 39°08′26″N 84°28′19″W

United Jewish Cemetery is a Reform Jewish cemetery, located at 3400 Montgomery Road in the Evanston neighborhood, in Cincinnati, Ohio. The cemetery was opened by members of Bene Israel and B'nai Jeshurum congregations in 1862. The first burial was Issac Fredrick on February 18, 1850, when ground was first consecrated.

Over the years, as the two congregations opened or acquired (through merger) other cemeteries, UJC grew to six graveyards. In 2008, UJC became a part of Jewish Cemeteries of Greater Cincinnati, Inc., which merged almost all of the area's 26 Jewish cemeteries into a single organization.

== Jewish Civil War Memorial ==
The Jewish Civil War Memorial is an obelisk, which was completed in 1868. It first honored one fallen Jewish Civil War soldier from Cincinnati, Lt. Louis Reitler, who was killed in battle in 1862. His name is inscribed on the east side of the memorial. The graves of five other Union Veterans lie near. The memorial now includes the names of local Jewish soldiers from World War I and World War II.

The United Jewish Cemetery rededicated its Veterans Memorial on Memorial Day 2008, with a Marine Corps Honor Guard and a 21 gun salute. The names of the fallen heroes were read aloud.

Civil War: Marx Esslinger, Joseph Ettlinger (Pvt. 5th Ohio), Jonas Goldsmith, Sam Keisser, Adolph Mangold and Louis Reitler.

World War I: Robert Livingston, James Rind and R. Robert Shroder.

World War II: John E. Davis; Robert F. Goldenberg; Richard J. Herman; James Herzberg; Stuart Allan Kaplan; Samuel L. Kessler; Tedd R. Levy; Leon Meyer Mack; James M. Pollock; Nathaniel Rosenthal; George E. Rosing; Dr. Howard M. Schriver; Harold Silverman; Bernard Harry Simpson; Richard J. Sloane; Milford Wirt Solomon; Robert Sanford Waldman; Ferdinand L. Weston and Jesse Myron Wolf.

== Notable burials ==
- Alfred M. Cohen (1859–1949), lawyer and Ohio state senator
- Louis Grossmann (1863–1926), rabbi
- Moritz Loth (1832–1913), businessman
- Jacob Mann (1888–1940), historian
- Robert Middleton (1911–1977), actor
- Julian Morgenstern (1881–1976), rabbi
- Theodore Albert Peyser (1873–1937), U.S. representative from New York
- Justus Thorner (1848–1928) the founding owner of the modern Cincinnati Reds (1882 and 1883); also owned the National League's Cincinnati Stars (1880) and the Union Association's Cincinnati Outlaw Reds (1884)
- Isaac Mayer Wise (1819–1900), rabbi
- Leo Wise (1849–1933), newspaper editor and publisher
- David Urbansky (1843–1897), Civil War hero who was the first Jew to be awarded a Medal of Honor
- George Zepin (1878–1963), rabbi

== See also ==
- Mayfield Cemetery – a United Jewish Cemeteries facility located on Mayfield Road in Cleveland Heights.
