= Charles Elwood Brown =

American politician (1834–1904)

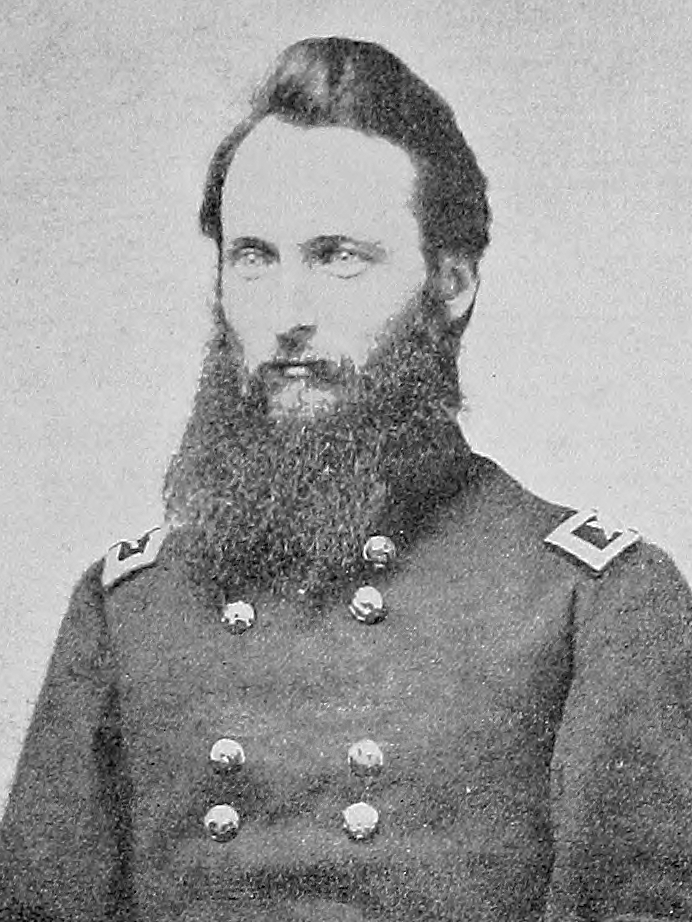

Member of the U.S. House of Representatives from Ohio's 2nd district
- In office March 4, 1885 – March 3, 1889
- Preceded by: Isaac M. Jordan
- Succeeded by: John A. Caldwell

Member of the Ohio Senate from the 1st district
- In office January 1, 1900 – January 5, 1902 Serving with Alfred M. Cohen; Carl L. Nippert
- Preceded by: Alfred M. Cohen; J. W. Harper; C. D. Robertson; Lewis Voight
- Succeeded by: Nicholas Longworth; Peter Echert; Lewis M. Hosea

Personal details
- Born: July 4, 1834 Cincinnati, Ohio, US
- Died: May 22, 1904 (aged 69) College Hill, Ohio, US
- Resting place: Spring Grove Cemetery, Cincinnati
- Party: Republican
- Education: Miami University

Military service
- Allegiance: United States
- Branch/service: United States Army; Union Army
- Years of service: 1861–1865
- Rank: Colonel; Brevet Brigadier General
- Unit: 63rd Ohio Infantry

Charles Elwood Brown (July 4, 1834 – May 22, 1904) was an officer in the Union Army during the American Civil War and a U.S. representative from Ohio.

== Biography ==
=== Early life ===
Born in Cincinnati, Ohio, Brown attended the common schools and Greenfield Academy, He was graduated from Miami University, Oxford, Ohio, in 1854. He went south and, while serving as tutor at Baton Rouge, Louisiana, studied law. He was admitted to the bar in 1859 and commenced practice in Chillicothe, Ohio. He served as prosecuting attorney of Ross County in 1859 and 1860.

=== Civil War service ===
In the first year of the American Civil War, Brown enlisted as a private in Company B, Sixty-third Regiment, Ohio Volunteers, September 2, 1861. He was promptly commissioned as a captain on October 23, 1861. Brown lost his left leg on July 22, 1864, in the Atlanta campaign. He was promoted through the ranks to colonel June 6, 1865. Brown was mustered out of the volunteers on July 8, 1865. In recognition of Brown's service and sacrifice in the Atlanta campaign, on January 13, 1866, President Andrew Johnson nominated him for appointment to the grade of brevet brigadier general to rank from March 13, 1865, and the U.S. Senate confirmed the appointment on March 12, 1866.

After the war, Brown was elected as a companion of the Ohio Commandery of the Military Order of the Loyal Legion of the United States.

=== Post war ===
After the Civil War, Brown resumed the practice of law in Chillicothe, Ohio. He served as postmaster of Chillicothe, 1866–1872. He was commissioned pension agent at Cincinnati in 1872, and held this position until President Hayes' administration began in 1877.

=== Congressional service ===
Brown was elected as a Republican to the Forty-ninth and Fiftieth U.S. Congresses (March 4, 1885 – March 3, 1889). He was not a candidate for renomination in 1888 and resumed the practice of law. He served as member of the State senate in 1900 and 1901.

=== Death and burial ===
Charles Elwood Brown died at College Hill, Ohio, on May 22, 1904. He was interred in Spring Grove Cemetery, Cincinnati, Ohio.

U.S. House of Representatives
Preceded by Isaac M. Jordan	Member of the U.S. House of Representatives from Ohio's 2nd congressional district 1885–1889	Succeeded by John A. Caldwell
