= George Zepin =

Ukrainian-born American rabbi and administrator (1878–1963)

- Born: June 8, 1878; Kiev, Russian Empire (now Kyiv, Ukraine)
- Died: April 9, 1963 (aged 84); Cincinnati, Ohio, United States
- Burial place: United Jewish Cemetery, Evanston, Ohio
- Occupation: Rabbi

George Zepin (June 8, 1878 – April 9, 1963) was a Ukrainian-born American rabbi and administrator of the Union of American Hebrew Congregations.

== Life ==
Zepin was born on June 8, 1878, in Kyiv, Russian Empire, the son of Otto Zepin and Hannah Matzov. He immigrated to America in 1881.

Zepin attended public school in Cincinnati, Ohio. He received a B.A. from the University of Cincinnati and a B.H.L. from Hebrew Union College. He was ordained a rabbi from the latter school and served as rabbi of Congregation B'nai Israel in Kalamazoo, Michigan from 1900 to 1903. He then served as Director of the Union of American Hebrew Congregations (UAHC) Department of Synagogue and School Extension from 1903 to 1906, superintendent of the Jewish Social Agencies of Chicago, Illinois, from 1908 to 1909, and rabbi of Congregation Beth El in Fort Worth, Texas, from 1909 to 1910. While serving as a rabbi in Fort Worth, he was the city's commissioner of charities from 1909 to 1910.

In 1910, Zepin returned to the UAHC to again direct the Department of Synagogue and School Extension. In 1917, he became the UAHC Executive Secretary. He served in that position until 1941, when he retired and became honorary secretary of the UAHC and honorary vice-chairman and secretary of the Rabbinical Pension Board. He helped organize the latter board. Over the course of his three decades with the UAHC, he was responsible for its expansive publication program of educational material and the establishment of the first systematic programming for synagogues. He played a major role in the organization and development of the National Federations of Temple Sisterhoods, Temple Brotherhoods, and Temple Youth. He also wrote multiple articles for the Universal Jewish Encyclopedia. In 1942, Hebrew Union College gave him an honorary D.D. degree.

Zepin was a member of the Central Conference of American Rabbis, the Alumni Association of Hebrew Union College, and B'nai B'rith. In 1914, he married Laura Lehman.

Zepin died in Cincinnati from a long illness on April 9, 1963. His funeral at the Weil Funeral Home was officiated by Rabbis Samuel Wohl, Murray Blackman, Sheldon Blank of HUC-JIR, and Daniel Davis of UAHC in New York. He was buried in United Jewish Cemetery in Evanston, Cincinnati.
