= David Orbansky =

American Civil War Medal of Honor recipient

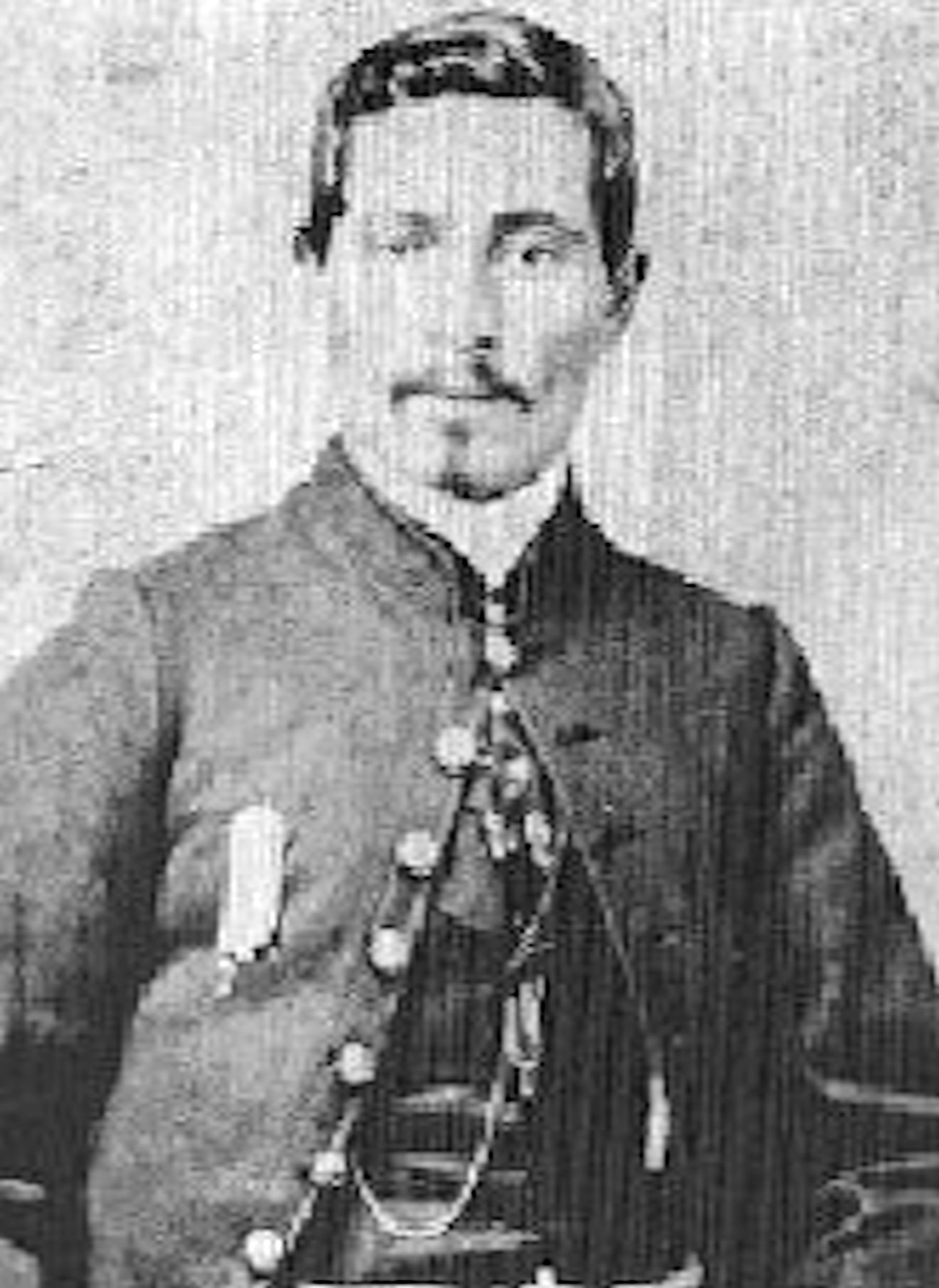
- Orbansky in 1865
- Born: 1843; Lautenburg, Prussia
- Died: January 22, 1897 (aged 53–54); Ohio
- Burial place: United Jewish Cemetery, Cincinnati, Ohio
- Military career
- Allegiance: United States; Union
- Branch: United States Army; Union Army
- Service years: 1861–1865
- Rank: Corporal
- Units: Company B, 58th Ohio Infantry
- Conflicts: American Civil War
- Awards: Medal of Honor

David Orbansky or 'Urbansky' was a Union Army soldier during the American Civil War. He earned the Medal of Honor for his gallantry in action against enemy Confederate States Army forces in the Battle of Shiloh, Tennessee, in 1862 and again at the Siege of Vicksburg, Mississippi, in 1863, as well as other actions. During the Vicksburg campaign, Urbansky rushed onto the battlefield to pick up his commander and under enemy fire, made it back to the Union line. He was buried at Piqua’s Cedar Hill Jewish cemetery and later reinterred at Walnut Hills United Jewish Cemetery in Evanston, Ohio, a neighborhood in the city of Cincinnati.

== Medal of Honor citation ==
- Rank and organization: Private, Company B, 58th Ohio Infantry
- Place and date: At Shiloh, Tenn.; Vicksburg, Miss., etc., 1862 and 1863.
- Entered service at: Columbus, Ohio.
- Birth: Lautenburg, Prussia.
- Date of issue: August 2, 1879.

Citation:

Gallantry in actions.

== See also ==
- List of Medal of Honor recipients
- List of Jewish Medal of Honor recipients
- List of American Civil War Medal of Honor recipients: M–P
