= Harry L. Gordon =

American politician

Harry Lincoln Gordon
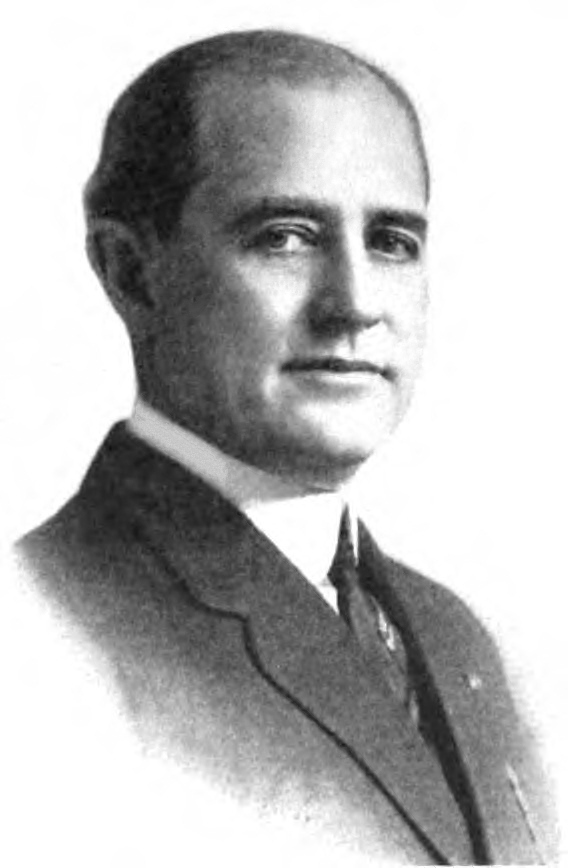

27th Lieutenant Governor of Ohio
- In office June 26, 1902 – January 11, 1904
- Governor: George K. Nash
- Preceded by: Carl L. Nippert
- Succeeded by: Warren G. Harding

Personal details
- Born: August 27, 1860 Metamora, Indiana, US
- Died: November 1, 1921 (aged 61) Avondale, Cincinnati, Ohio, US
- Resting place: Spring Grove Cemetery
- Party: Republican
- Spouse: Esther Langtree
- Children: one
- Education: DePauw University

Harry Lincoln Gordon (August 27, 1860 – November 1, 1921) was an American politician who served as the 27th lieutenant governor of Ohio from 1902 to 1904.

== Biography ==
Harry Lincoln Gordon was born August 27, 1860, at Metamora, Indiana, and attended schools there. His parents were M.B. and Sophia (Tracy) Gordon. He graduated from DePauw University in 1882 with high honors in mathematics. He studied law at the office of McDonald, Butler, & Mason in Indianapolis, Indiana, was admitted to the bar and moved to Wichita, Kansas. Gordon was chosen city solicitor of Wichita, and was elected to represent Sedgwick County in the Kansas State Senate 1895–1896.

In December, 1896, Gordon moved to Cincinnati, Ohio, where he practiced law. Mayor Tafel appointed him a member of the Board of Supervisors, and he became president of the body in 1900. He was appointed to a second term in 1902 by Mayor Fleischmann.

In 1902, Carl L. Nippert resigned as Ohio Lieutenant Governor, and Governor Nash appointed Gordon to the position June 26, 1902. In 1905, Gordon was the Republican candidate for Mayor, but lost to Edward J. Dempsey. This was his last campaign.

Gordon was a Republican, a member of the Business Men's club, the Cuvier Club, and the Avondale Athletic Club. He was a Scottish Rite Mason. He married Esther Langtree of Aurora, Indiana, April 20, 1892, and had a son. Gordon died from hardening of the arteries at his Avondale, Cincinnati home on November 1, 1921, and was buried at Spring Grove Cemetery.

Political offices
Preceded by Carl L. Nippert	Lieutenant Governor of Ohio; 1902–1904	Succeeded by Warren G. Harding
