= Carl L. Nippert =

American politician

Carl Louis Nippert
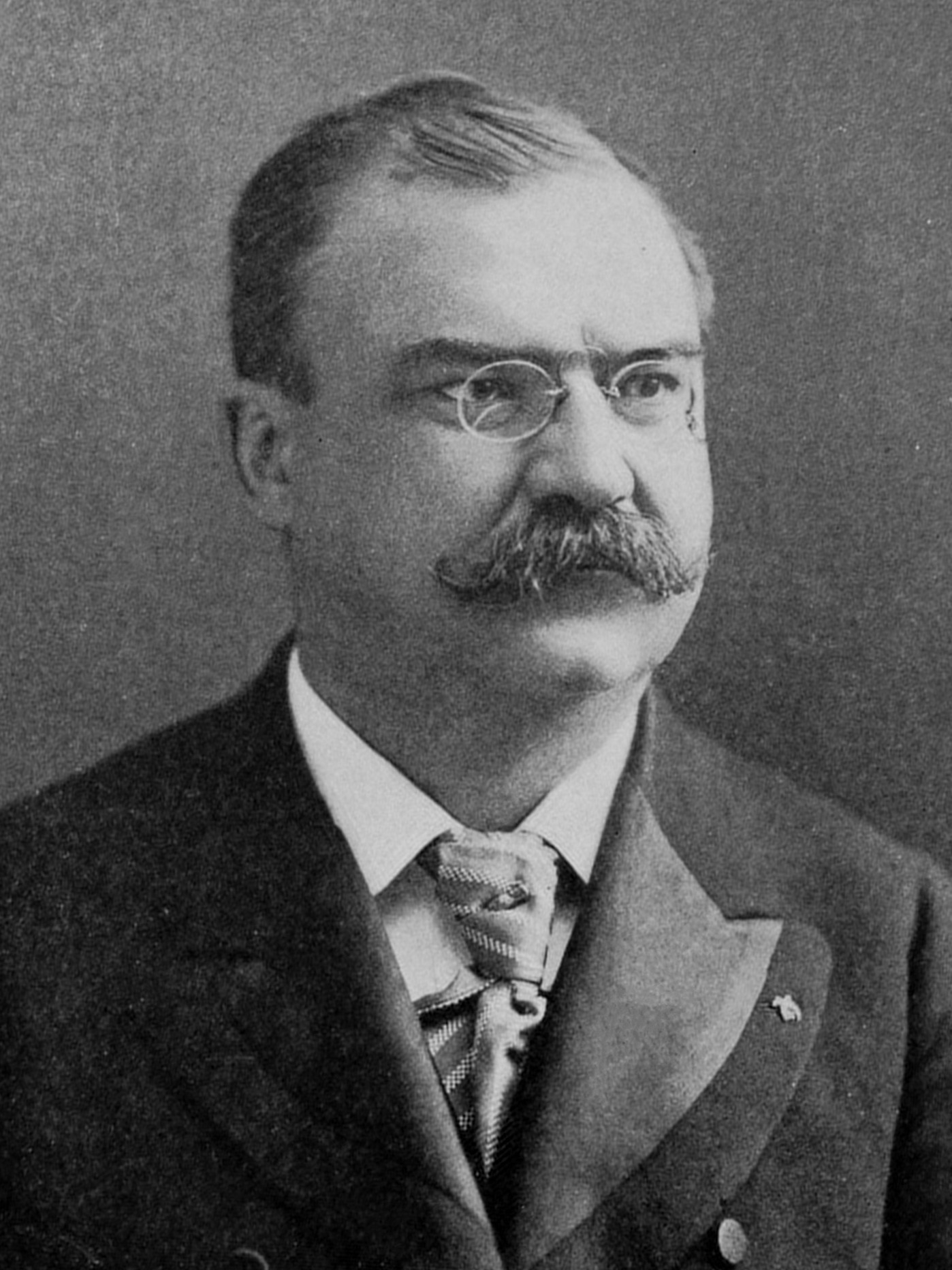

26th Lieutenant Governor of Ohio
- In office January 13, 1902 – May 1, 1902
- Governor: George K. Nash
- Preceded by: John A. Caldwell
- Succeeded by: Harry L. Gordon

Member of the Ohio Senate from the first district
- In office January 1, 1900 – January 5, 1902 Serving with Alfred M. Cohen; Charles Elwood Brown
- Preceded by: Alfred M. Cohen; J. W. Harper; C. D. Robertson
- Succeeded by: Nicholas Longworth; Peter Echert; Lewis M. Hosea

Personal details
- Born: October 11, 1852 Frankfurt, Germany
- Died: September 5, 1904 (aged 51) Clifton, Cincinnati, Ohio, U.S.
- Resting place: Spring Grove Cemetery
- Party: Republican
- Spouse(s): Elsie Hitscherich; Katie Brill
- Children: one daughter
- Education: Karlsruhe Institute of Technology; University of Zurich; Cincinnati Law School

Carl Louis Nippert (October 11, 1852 – September 5, 1904) was a German-American engineer and politician, who served as the 26th lieutenant governor of Ohio in 1902.

== Early life ==
Nippert was born in Frankfurt to American parents, Louis and Meta Nippert. His father was from Cincinnati, Ohio, and was sent to Frankfurt to run a Methodist Episcopal Church seminary. The father returned to Walnut Hills, Cincinnati in the 1870s.

Nippert studied engineering at the universities of Karlsruhe, Germany, and Zürich, Switzerland. After finishing his studies in 1874, he started working as an engineer in Frankfurt, Germany. In 1876 he migrated to the United States to work on the construction of the world fair in Philadelphia.

Nippert worked as a school teacher (1877–1889) and principal (after 1891) in Cincinnati. During this time he advocated the German language. He graduated from Cincinnati Law School,

== Career ==
In 1891 he became a lawyer. Eight years later he became a member of the Ohio State Senate for the Republican party.

In 1901, Nippert was elected lieutenant governor of Ohio. He began his term January 1902. A vacancy opened for the Hamilton County Probate Judge, and Governor Nash appointed Nippert to the seat on May 1, 1902. He was elected to a three-year term on the court in 1903.

== Personal life ==
Nippert married Elsie Hitscherich of Karlsruhe, and later married Katie Brill of Cincinnati on July 25, 1889. They had one daughter, who died in childhood.

In the United States, Nippert was a member of several German associations. Nippert was a Freemason and member of the B.P.O.E.

Nippert died of heart disease in 1904.

Political offices
| Preceded by John A. Caldwell | Lieutenant Governor of Ohio; 1902 | Succeeded by Harry L. Gordon |
