= Asa W. Jones =

American politician

Asahel Wellington Jones
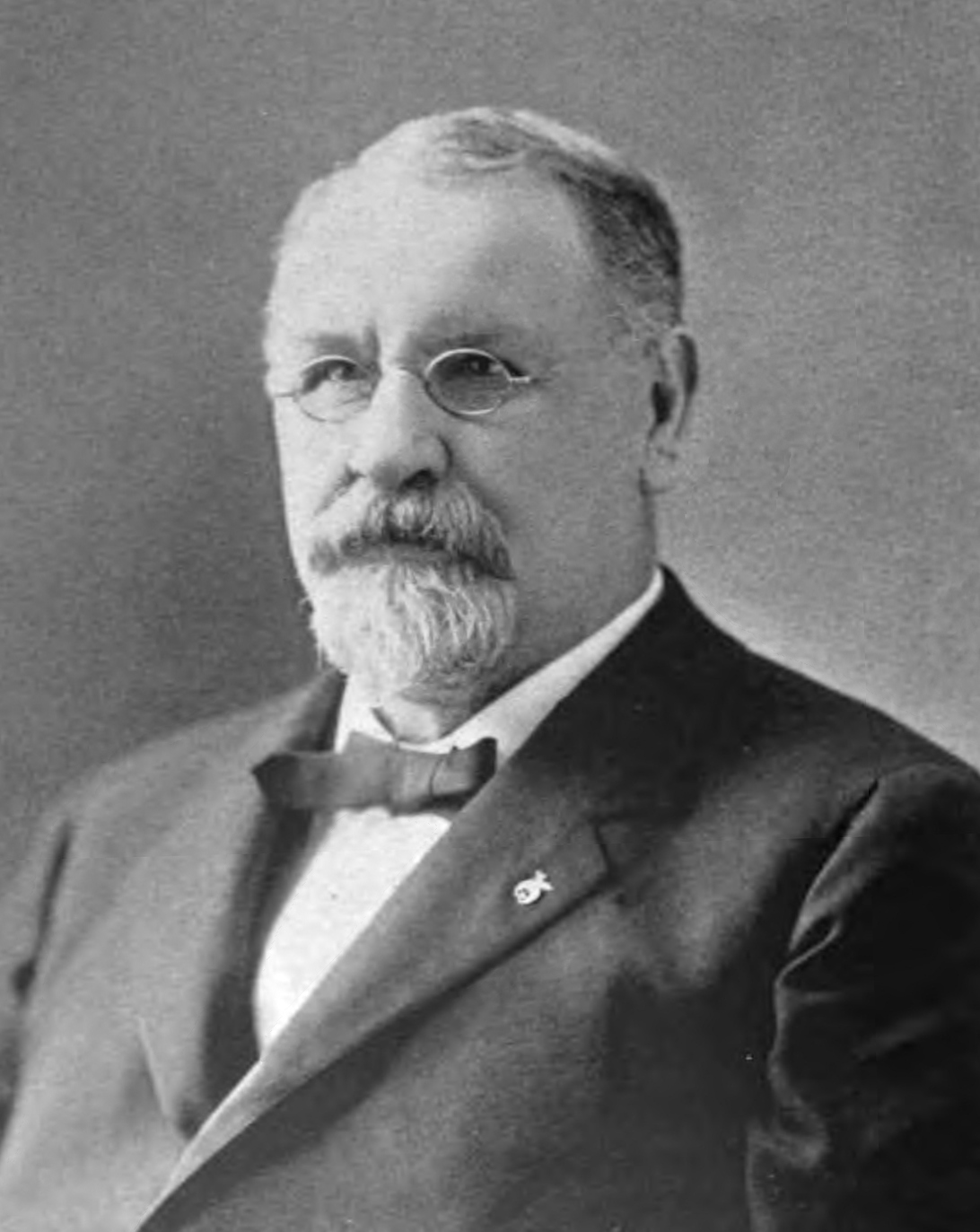
- circa 1897

24th Lieutenant Governor of Ohio
- In office January 13, 1896 – January 8, 1900
- Governor: Asa S. Bushnell
- Preceded by: Andrew L. Harris
- Succeeded by: John A. Caldwell

5th President of Ohio State Bar Association
- In office December 31, 1884 – December 30, 1885
- Preceded by: Durbin Ward
- Succeeded by: William J. Gilmore

Personal details
- Born: September 18, 1838 Johnstonsville, Ohio, U.S.
- Died: October 9, 1918 (aged 80) Trumbull County, Ohio, U.S.
- Party: Republican
- Spouse(s): Jeanette Palmer; Louise Brice
- Children: two
- Education: Western Reserve Academy
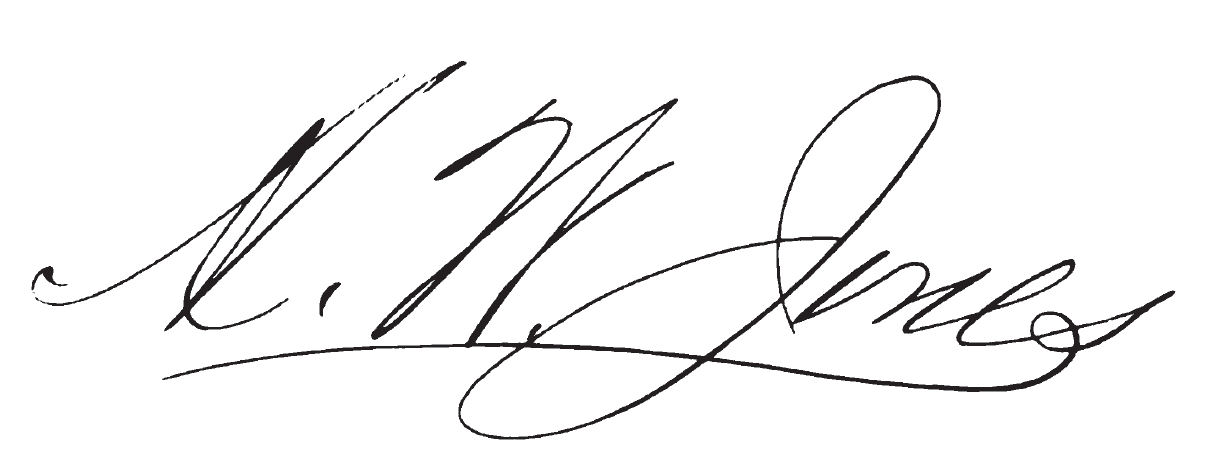
- Signature

Asahel Wellington Jones (September 18, 1838 – October 9, 1918) was an American Republican politician who served as the 24th lieutenant governor of Ohio from 1896 to 1900.

Jones was born September 18, 1838, at Johnstonsville, Trumbull County, Ohio, son of William P. Jones, born in Trumbull County, and Mary J. Bond, born in New York. He was raised on a farm and educated in the public schools. He attended Western Reserve Academy. He read law in Warren, and was admitted to the bar 1859. In 1861, he opened an office in Mecca, Ohio, during the oil boom there. In 1864, he moved to Youngstown. His practice there concentrated on personal injury lawsuits involving railroads. In 1869, he was elected Prosecuting Attorney of Mahoning County, and re-elected in 1871. He later was general council for the Pittsburg and Western Railroad, and attorney for the Pennsylvania Railroad Company, and the Baltimore and Ohio Railroad. He was director and a large stockholder of the Second National Bank of Youngstown, and the Dollar Savings and Trust Company.

In 1880 Jones was a delegate to the Republican National Convention. In December, 1884, he was elected President of the Ohio State Bar Association. Governor Foraker appointed him judge advocate general of the state. In 1895, he was nominated at the state Republican Convention, and won election as Lieutenant Governor. He won re-election in 1897.

In 1906, Jones retired from legal practice, and concentrated on farming at Hartford. He was married September 24, 1861, to Jeanette Palmer, who had two children, and died in 1901. In 1904, he married Louise Brice of Oberlin, Ohio, a graduate of Oberlin College.

Jones died in his country home in Trumbull County on October 9, 1918. Jones was a member of the Methodist Episcopal faith, and was a Freemason

== Notes ==
Political offices
Preceded by William V. Marquis	Lieutenant Governor of Ohio; 1896–1900	Succeeded by John A. Caldwell
