= 106th Ohio Infantry Regiment =

- Active: August 26, 1862, to June 29, 1865
- Country: United States
- Allegiance: Union
- Branch: Infantry
- Engagements: Defense of Cincinnati; Battle of Hartsville

The 106th Ohio Infantry Regiment, sometimes 106th Ohio Volunteer Infantry (or 106th OVI) was an infantry regiment in the Union Army during the American Civil War. It was also known as the 4th German Regiment.

== Service ==
The 106th Ohio Infantry was organized at Camp Dennison near Cincinnati, Ohio, and mustered in (eight companies) for three years service on August 26, 1862, under the command of Colonel George B. Wright. Companies I and K were mustered in for one year service at Camp Dennison in October 1864.

The regiment was attached to 39th Brigade, 12th Division, Army of the Ohio, to November 1862. District of Western Kentucky, Department of the Ohio, to December 1862. Prisoners of war to March 1863. District of Western Kentucky, Department of the Ohio, to June 1863. Post of Gallatin, Tennessee, Department of the Cumberland, to May 1864. Unassigned, 4th Division, XX Corps, Department of the Cumberland, Garrison of Bridgeport, Alabama, to July 1864. 3rd Brigade, Defenses of Nashville & Chattanooga Railroad, Department of the Cumberland, to February 1865. Stevenson, Alabama, District of North Alabama, Department of the Cumberland, to June 1865.

The 106th Ohio Infantry mustered out of service at Nashville, Tennessee, on June 29, 1865.

== Detailed service ==
Ordered to Covington. Ky., September 4. Defense of Covington, Ky., and Cincinnati, Ohio, against Edmund Kirby Smith's threatened attack September 4–12. Ordered to Louisville, Ky., September 18. March to Frankfort, Ky., October 3–9, 1862, and duty there until October 24. March to Bowling Green, Ky., October 24-November 4, then to Glasgow, Ky., November 10. Action near Tompkinsville November 19, Moved to Hartsville, Tenn., November 28. Battle of Hartsville December 7. Regiment captured and paroled. Exchanged January 12, 1863. At Camp Parole, Columbus, Ohio, until March. Ordered to Lexington, Ky., March 24, then to Frankfort, and duty there until May, operating against guerrillas. Moved to Nashville, Tenn., May 1–4, then to Gallatin, Tenn., June, and guard duty along Louisville & Nashville Railroad from Nashville to borders of Kentucky until May 1864. Butler's Mill, near Buck Lodge, June 30 (detachment). Moved to Bridgeport, Ala., May 4, and garrison duty there until January 1865. Skirmish at Cane Creek, Ala., June 10, 1864. At Stevenson, Ala., January to June 1865.

== Casualties ==
The regiment lost a total of 52 men during service; 3 officers and 27 enlisted men killed or mortally wounded, 1 officer and 21 enlisted men died of disease.

== Commanders ==
- Colonel George B. Wright
- Lieutenant Colonel Gustav Tafel

== Notable members ==
- Lieutenant Colonel Gustav Tafel - mayor of Cincinnati, Ohio, 1897–1900

== See also ==
- List of Ohio Civil War units
- Ohio in the Civil War
