= Isaac M. Jordan =

American politician (1835–1890)

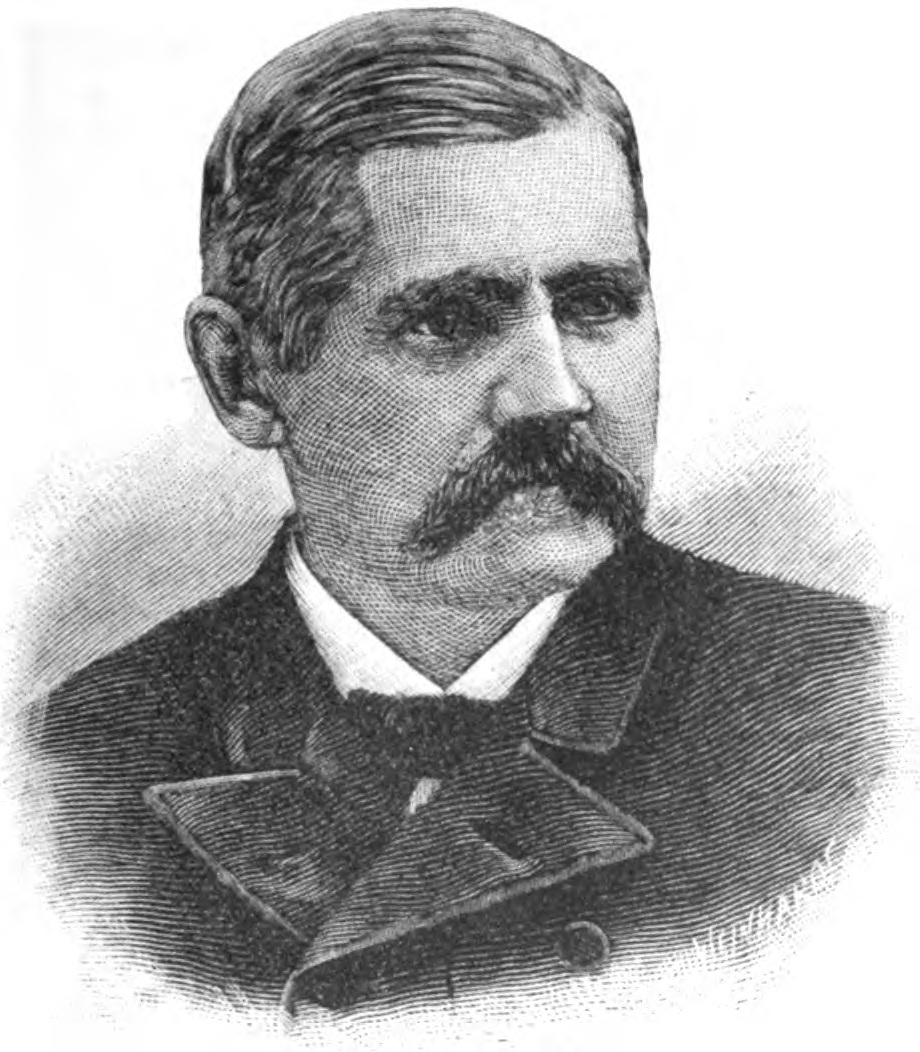

Member of the U.S. House of Representatives from Ohio's 2nd district
- In office March 4, 1883 – March 3, 1885
- Preceded by: Thomas L. Young
- Succeeded by: Charles Elwood Brown

Personal details
- Born: Isaac Alfred Jordan; May 5, 1835 Mifflinburg, Pennsylvania, US
- Died: December 3, 1890 (aged 55) Cincinnati, Ohio, US
- Resting place: Spring Grove Cemetery
- Party: Democratic
- Education: Miami University
- Occupation: Lawyer

Isaac M. Jordan, born Isaac Alfred Jordan, (May 5, 1835 – December 3, 1890) was a United States Congressman and a lawyer. He was also a founding member of Sigma Chi fraternity.

== Early life ==
Isaac Alfred Jordan was born on May 5, 1835, in Mifflinburg, Pennsylvania. His parents were Sarah (nee Smith) and Amos Jordan. He was the youngest of eleven children. His family moved to Springfield, Ohio in 1837. When he was around fourteen years old, his family moved to West Liberty, Ohio. He attended the Common Schools in Springfield and West Liberty, followed by two years at Geneva Hall in Northwood, Ohio, graduating in 1854.

Jordan attended Miami University and joined the Kappa chapter of Delta Kappa Epsilon, along with his childhood friend Benjamin Piatt Runkle. When a disagreement arose within the fraternity chapter, Jordan and Runkle joined five other men who formed a new fraternity, Sigma Chi, on June 28, 1855. Sigma Phi later became known as Sigma Chi. Jordan was the chapter's consul primus or presiding officer in the spring 1856 semester and the orator of the fraternity's first Grand Chapter meeting in 1857.Jordan also belonged to the Erodelphian Literary Society.

Jordan graduated from Miami University with an A.B. in 1857. He then studied law in the Dayton, Ohio law office of his brothers Jackson A. Jordan and Nathan E. Jordan. He was admitted to the bar in 1858. He received an A.M. from Miami University in 1862.

== Career ==
In 1858, Jordan practiced law in Dayton, Ohio with his brothers in the firm Jordan & Jordan. During that time, he changed his middle initial to M (meaning nothing in particular) to distinguish himself from his brother, as he thought people would confuse J. A. and I. A. Jordan. He moved to Cincinnati, Ohio in 1860 where he worked for Judge Thomas M. Key. He then worked with Thomas Washington, followed by Flamen Ball, U.S. District Attorney. In 1864, he formed a law firm with his brother Nathan E. Jordan. Later, Homer Jordan, Joseph W. O'Hara, and Jordan Thomas (his nephew) joined the firm, with became Jordan & Jordans.

In 1882, he was elected as a Democrat to the 48th United States Congress for the first district of Ohio, a Republican district. He declined to run for reelection for business reasons (his brother Jackson died leaving a vacancy at the law firm) and only served one term, from March 4, 1883, to March 3, 1885. He, then, returned to his law practice in Cincinnati.

== Personal life ==
Jordan married Elizabeth Phelps, the daughter of an attorney in Covington, Kentucky on May 5, 1863. The couple had five children; two died in childhood.

In 1881, Jordan helped established the Cincinnati Alumni Chapter of Sigma Chi. During his speech in 1884 at the 15th Grand Chapter, he explained the standard by which all pledges and brothers should be judged, which is now known as the Jordan Standard.

Jordan died on December 3, 1890, from injuries received from falling down an open elevator shaft in Cincinnati. He was buried in Spring Grove Cemetery in Cincinnati.

U.S. House of Representatives
Preceded by Thomas L. Young	Member of the U.S. House of Representatives from Ohio's 2nd congressional district 1883–1885	Succeeded by Charles Elwood Brown
