= 58th Ohio Infantry Regiment =

- Active: October 1, 1861, to September 16, 1865
- Country: United States
- Allegiance: Union
- Branch: Union Army
- Type: Infantry
- Engagements: Battle of Fort Donelson; Battle of Shiloh; Siege of Corinth; Battle of Chickasaw Bayou; Battle of Arkansas Post; Siege of Vicksburg

The 58th Ohio Infantry Regiment was an infantry regiment in the Union Army during the American Civil War.

== Service ==
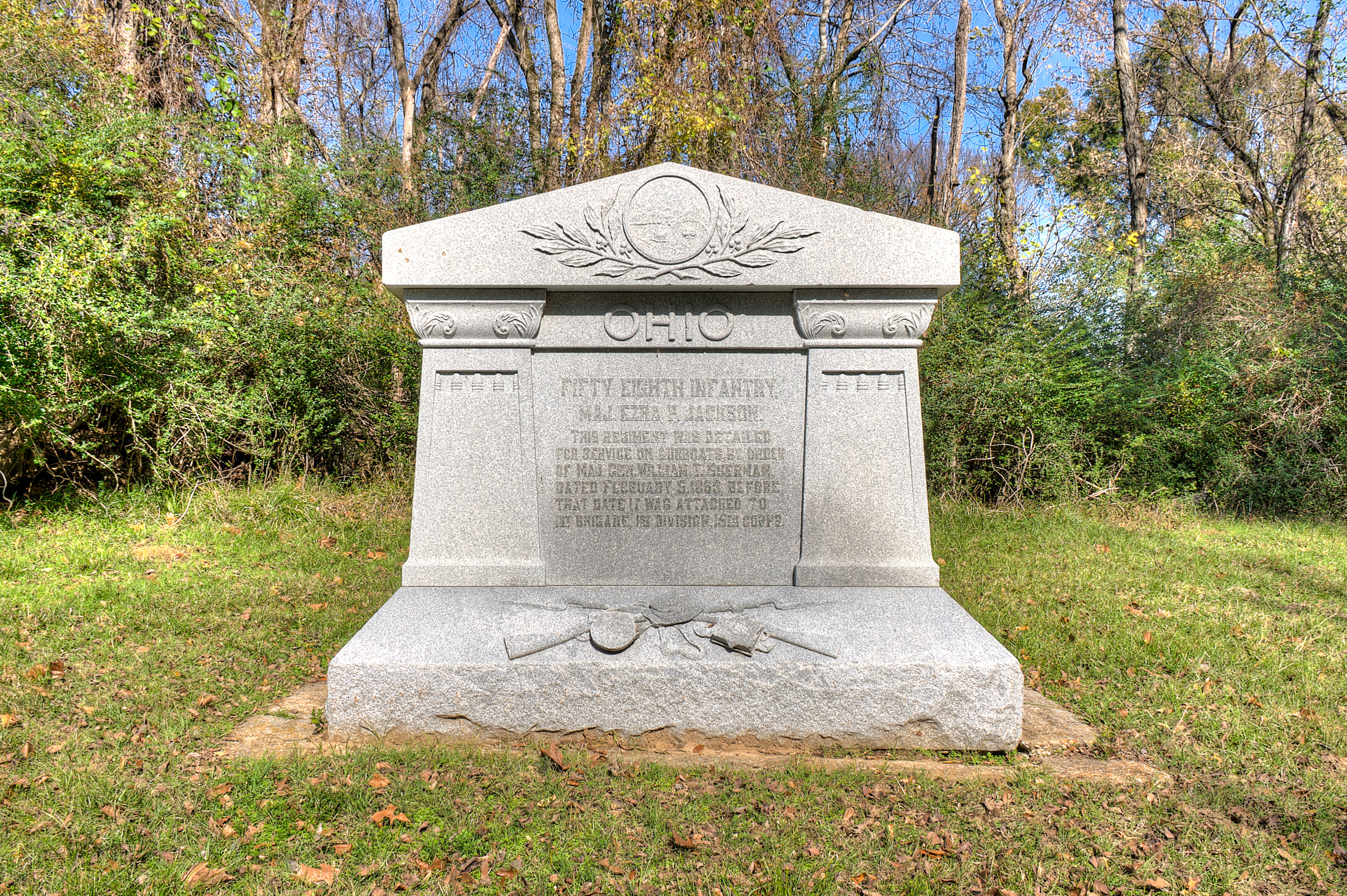
Memorial at Vicksburg National Military Park

The 58th Ohio Infantry Regiment was organized at Camp Chase in Columbus, Ohio and mustered in for three years service on January 28, 1862, under the command of Colonel Valentine Bausenwein.

The regiment was attached to 2nd Brigade, 3rd Division, Army of the Tennessee, to July 1862. Helena, Arkansas, District of Eastern Arkansas, to November 1862. 1st Brigade, 1st Division, District of Eastern Arkansas, Department of the Tennessee, to December 1862. 1st Brigade, 11th Division, Right Wing, XIII Corps, Department of the Tennessee, to December 1862. 1st Brigade, 4th Division, Sherman's Yazoo Expedition, to January 1863. 1st Brigade, 1st Division, XV Corps, Army of the Tennessee, to February 1863. Detached duty on ironclads for Mississippi River Squadron to September 1863. 1st Brigade 1st Division, XVII Corps, to September 1864. Post and defenses of Vicksburg, Mississippi, to September 1865.

The 58th Ohio Infantry mustered out of service on September 16, 1865.

== Detailed service ==
- Moved to Cincinnati, Ohio, February 10, 1862; then to Fort Donelson, Tenn.
- Investment and capture of Fort Donelson, Tenn., February 14–16, 1862.
- Expedition toward Purdy and operations about Crump's Landing, Tenn., March 9–14.
- Battle of Shiloh April 6–7. Advance on and siege of Corinth, Miss., April 29-May 30.
- March to Memphis, Tenn., June 1–17, and duty there until July 24.
- Moved to Helena, Ark., July 24, and duty there until October 5.
- Expedition to Milliken's Bend, La., August 16–27. Capture of steamer Fair Play August 17. Milliken's Bend August 18. Haines Bluff August 20. Bolivar August 22 and 25. Greenville August 23. Moved to St. Genevieve, Mo., October 5. Expedition to Pilot Knob October 22-November 12. Moved to Helena, Ark., and expedition against Arkansas Post, Ark., November 16–21. At Camp Steele, Helena, Ark., until December 22.
- Sherman's Yazoo Expedition December 22, 1862, to January 3, 1863. Chickasaw Bayou December 26–28. Chickasaw Bluff December 29.
- Expedition to Arkansas Post, Ark., January 3–10, 1863.
- Assault and capture of Fort Hindman, Arkansas Post, January 10–11.
- Moved to Young's Point, La., January 17–21.
- Assigned to duty by companies on the ironclads of the Mississippi Squadron February 8, and participated in the following service: attack on Fort Pemberton March 13. Expedition up Steele's Bayou March 16–22. Deer Creek, "Long Taw," March 21.
- Running Vicksburg batteries April 15. Grand Gulf April 29. Haines Bluff April 30-May 1 and 6.
- Expedition up Wachita to Trinity May 8–12. Fort Beauregard May 10–12.
- Siege of Vicksburg May 18-July 4. Yazoo City May 23. Lake Providence June 10. Patrol duty on the Mississippi River from mouth of Red River until July 26.
- Expedition to Grand Gulf July 10–17. Grand Gulf July 16.
- Relieved from duty with the fleet and ordered to Vicksburg, Miss.
- Provost duty at Vicksburg July 1863 to September 1865.
- Old members ordered to Columbus, Ohio, December 24, 1864.

== Casualties ==
The regiment lost a total of 305 men during service; 3 officers and 85 enlisted men killed or mortally wounded, 2 officers and 215 enlisted men died of disease.

== Commanders ==
- Colonel Valentine Bausenwein
- Colonel Ferdinand F. Rempel - commanded at the battle of Fort Donelson as lieutenant colonel
- Lieutenant Colonel Peter Dister - killed in action
- Lieutenant Colonel Ezra P. Jackson

== Notable members ==
- Sergeant Johann Stuber, Company A - Author of 1896 German language daily journal published in Cincinnati in 1896.
- Private David Orbansky, Company B - Medal of Honor recipient for action at the battle of Shiloh and the siege of Vicksburg
- Private William Theodore Morrison - an aide to General Ulysses S. Grant, he was injured in the Battle of Shiloh and given an Honorable Medical Discharge

== See also ==
- List of Ohio Civil War units
- Ohio in the Civil War
- Battle of Fort Donelson
- Battle of Shiloh
- Siege of Vicksburg
