= John A. Caldwell =

American politician

John Alexander Caldwell
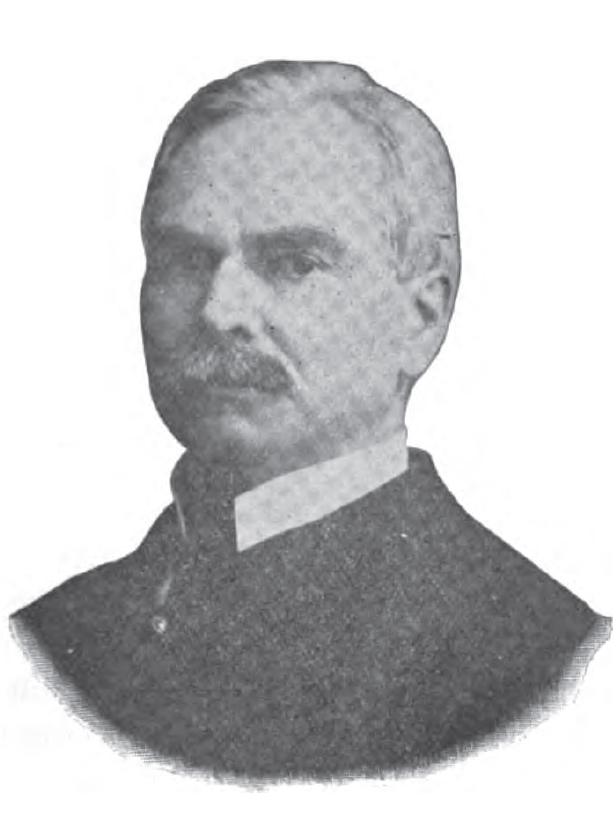

25th Lieutenant Governor of Ohio
- In office January 8, 1900 – January 13, 1902
- Governor: George K. Nash
- Preceded by: Asa W. Jones
- Succeeded by: Carl L. Nippert

Member of the U.S. House of Representatives from Ohio's 2nd district
- In office March 4, 1889 – May 4, 1894
- Preceded by: Charles Elwood Brown
- Succeeded by: Jacob H. Bromwell

Mayor of Cincinnati
- In office 1894–1897
- Preceded by: John B. Mosby
- Succeeded by: Gustav Tafel

Personal details
- Born: April 21, 1852 Fairhaven, Ohio, U.S.
- Died: May 24, 1927 (aged 75) Cincinnati, Ohio, U.S.
- Resting place: Spring Grove Cemetery
- Party: Republican
- Education: Cincinnati Law School

John Alexander Caldwell (April 21, 1852 – May 24, 1927) was a U.S. representative from Ohio from 1889 to 1894. He also served as the 25th lieutenant governor of Ohio from 1900 to 1902.

== Biography ==
Born in Fairhaven, Ohio, Caldwell was educated in the common schools of his native county and also by private teachers. He taught school for several years. He was graduated from the Cincinnati Law School in 1876. He was admitted to the bar the same year. He again engaged in teaching. He commenced the practice of law in Cincinnati, Ohio, in 1878. He served as prosecuting attorney of the Cincinnati police court 1881–1885.

Caldwell was elected judge of the city police court in 1887.

Caldwell was elected president of the Ohio League of Republican Clubs in 1887.

Caldwell was elected as a Republican to the Fifty-first, Fifty-second, and Fifty-third Congresses and served from March 4, 1889, until May 4, 1894, when he resigned. He served as mayor of Cincinnati from 1894 to 1897 and as the lieutenant governor of Ohio from 1900 to 1902.

Caldwell was elected judge of the court of common pleas in 1902, and served until his death in Cincinnati, Ohio, May 24, 1927.

He was interred in Spring Grove Cemetery.

== Sources ==
- United States Congress. "John A. Caldwell (id: C000034)". Biographical Directory of the United States Congress.

U.S. House of Representatives
Preceded by Charles Elwood Brown	Member of the U.S. House of Representatives from Ohio's 2nd congressional district 1889–1894	Succeeded by Jacob H. Bromwell
Political offices
Preceded by Asa W. Jones	Lieutenant Governor of Ohio; 1900–1902	Succeeded by Carl L. Nippert
