= Cincinnati Strangler =

American serial killer

- Posteal Laskey Jr., the man believed to be the "Cincinnati Strangler"
- Born: Posteal Laskey Jr. June 18, 1937; Cincinnati, Ohio, U.S.
- Died: May 29, 2007 (aged 69); Pickaway Correctional Institution, Scioto Township, Pickaway County, Ohio, U.S.
- Occupation: Cab driver (formerly)
- Conviction: First degree murder
- Penalty: Death; commuted to life imprisonment

Details
- Victims: 7 (one conviction)
- Span of crimes: 1965–1966
- Country: United States
- State: Ohio
- Date apprehended: December 1966

The Cincinnati Strangler was the name given to an American serial killer responsible for the murder of seven women in Cincinnati, Ohio, between December 1965 and December 9, 1966. During the investigation, a local resident, Posteal Laskey Jr. (June 18, 1937 – May 29, 2007), was declared the main suspect in the killings and was arrested on December 9, 1966, for one of the murders for which he was subsequently convicted. Although he was never charged with the other murders, the media and police blamed him for the other deaths since according to the official version of the investigators, the murders ceased after his arrest.

== Murders ==
The perpetrator chose as victims women between the ages of 31 and 81 living in Cincinnati's various housing complexes, which were inhabited by poor residents of the city. In five of the seven murders, the victims were sexually assaulted. The first victim was 56-year-old Emogene Harrington, who was strangled to death on December 2, 1965. Four months later, on April 4, 1966, 58-year-old Lois Dant was found strangled, raped and beaten in her ground floor apartment. She was talking to a friend on the phone and hung up when there was a knock on the door, which, according to the investigators, was her killer. On June 10, the Strangler attacked 56-year-old Matilda Jeannette Messer in one of the city's parks and beat, raped, and strangled her. After killing her, the criminal tied Messer's dog to a tree in the immediate vicinity of the body. The next victim of the serial killer was 31-year-old Barbara Bowman, who was attacked on August 14. She had been to a bar that day and then called a taxi to drive her home. After the car arrived, Bowman got in. The driver was described as a young black man. Less than two blocks from her apartment, she was attacked by the cabbie and stabbed in the throat seven times. She died shortly after the police arrived, but witnesses managed to describe the criminal and even write down his license plate. However, her age and the fact that the culprit had used a knife caused Bowman to be initially temporarily dropped from the list of victims. During the investigation, it was established that the perpetrator was traveling in taxi number 186 belonging to the Yellow Cab Company, which had been reported stolen to the police a few hours before Bowman's murder. At 31, she was the youngest of the killer's victims. On October 11, the newly dubbed "Cincinnati Strangler" killed 51-year-old Alice Hochhausler. Nine days later, on October 20, 81-year-old Rose Winstel was found beaten and strangled in her apartment. On December 9, the criminal attacked 81-year-old Lula Kerrick in the elevator of her downtown apartment building; he beat and strangled her with one of her own stockings.

== Investigation ==
The series of murders caused a moral panic among the Cincinnati population. As a result, the city recorded a colossal increase in sales of weapons and door locks, the level of confidence among girls and women dropped sharply, and the Cincinnati Police announced a special operation to capture the perpetrator. Several bars and nightclubs were closing earlier than normal. Halloween was moved to Sunday afternoons for two years.

On December 9, 1966, after the murder of Kerrick, 22-year-old Sandra Chapas contacted the police and claimed that a few hours before the Kerrick killing, she had been followed by a suspicious black man to her car, who promptly attempted to rape her on the stairwell of her apartment, but she was thankfully saved by her neighbor. Chapas and a few other witnesses remembered the license plate number of the car that the offender was driving and passed it on to the police. On the same day, the car's owner, 29-year-old Posteal Laskey Jr., a laborer, was arrested. Laskey had been living with his mother and in his free time tried to build a career as a musician, playing guitar in a little-known group. Shortly before his arrest he had rented an apartment in another part of the city, where he was living with a friend.

After digging into his past, the police discovered that Laskey had been prosecuted for attacking a woman in 1965, and sentenced to three years' probation in October 1965. It was also revealed that Laskey had worked as a taxi driver for the Yellow Cab Company from July to December 1962, when all cars used identical ignition keys, and that he drove number 186. The company management told the police that after his dismissal, Posteal pocketed the ignition key and a number of other items that he was supposed to hand over. On the night of August 13, 1966, and the following morning, after the numbered 186 cab had been stolen, somebody answered the dispatcher's calls and then picked up Barbara Bowman. After surveying visitors to the bar, witnesses told that they had seen Bowman leaving and entering into a taxi. After being presented with photos of the suspect, they identified Posteal Laskey as the driver and Barbara's likely murderer.

After the arrest, 69-year-old Delle Ernst contacted the police and proclaimined that Laskey had robbed her on October 4, 1966. A similar testimony was given by Virginia Hinners, who said that Posteal had robbed her on September 21 that same year.

== Aftermath ==
Based on the circumstantial evidence and testimony, in April 1967, Posteal Laskey Jr. was convicted of killing Barbara Bowman and was sentenced to death in the electric chair. The date of his execution was set for July 8, 1968, but by then, his lawyers had appealed the verdict by citing the fact that the presumption of his innocence was violated when Posteal was vilified by the prosecutor's office and the media as the infamous serial killer, which they had failed to prove in court. The intense publicity surrounding the case had prevented their client from receiving a fair trial, but the court rejected the appeal by stating that there was no racial or social prejudice in the decision. Nevertheless, the US Supreme Court, in June 1972, commuted Laskey's sentence to life imprisonment with a chance of parole.

For the rest of his life, Laskey was moved around various penitentiaries in the state. He applied for parole on several occasions but was denied every time. In February 2007, the 69-year-old was once again denied parole and banned from applying until 2017. However, he died on May 29, 2007, after he had spent more than 40 years behind bars.

== See also ==
- List of serial killers in the United States

== Sources ==
- Townsend, J. T. (August 1997). "The Legacy of the Cincinnati Strangler". Cincinnati. 30 (11): 30–36.
- Townsend, J. T. (2012). "Terror in the Gaslight District: Alice Hochhausen Falls Victim to the Cincinnati Strangler: 1966". Queen City Gothic: Cincinnati's Most Infamous Murder Mysteries (revised ed.). Bloomington, IN: AuthorHouse. pp. 327–362. ISBN 9781467057127. OCLC 891380967.
