= Gustav Tafel =

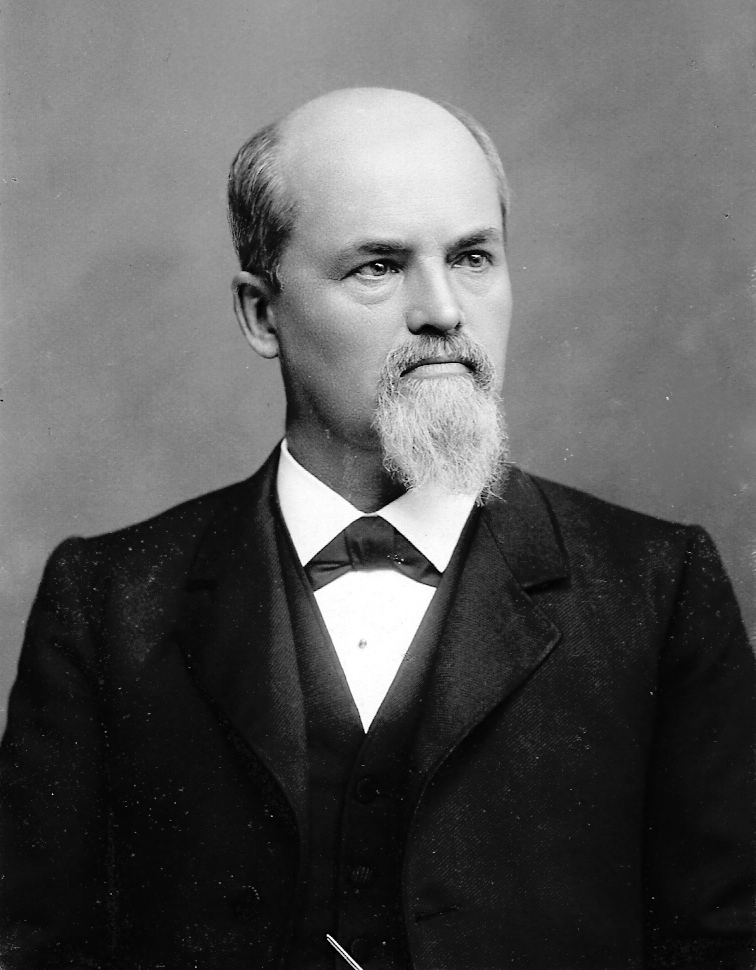
Portrait of Tafel

Gustav Tafel (October 13, 1830 – November 12, 1908) was a German-born colonel in the Union Army during the American Civil War, and the mayor of Cincinnati, Ohio, from 1897 to 1900.

== Biography ==
Tafel was born in Munich, Germany (München). He was the son of the theologian and Bible translator Johann Friedrich Leonhard Tafel (1800–1880) and Carolina Luise Vaihinger (1801–1887). He was one of the Forty-Eighters, meaning he fled Germany after the Revolution of 1848. He started in Cincinnati as a printer, and later became a newspaper editor. Together with Max Burgheim, he later developed the Cincinnati Freie Presse into one of the most influential German-language daily newspapers in the Midwest, using it as a platform for the ideals of the Forty-Eighters. He resided in a house at the northeastern corner of 14th and Walnut streets from 1848 to 1870. At the time, Cincinnati had a large German population and a number of German language newspapers, and Tafel quickly became a leader in that community.

When war erupted and Governor William Dennison called for volunteers to join the army, Tafel enlisted with the Cincinnati "Turnverein" and served as a lieutenant in Company A, 9th Ohio Infantry, a mostly German regiment. In June 1862 he was assigned to command the 106th Ohio Infantry (aka, "The 4th German Regiment"), one of the last German regiments raised in the state. However, because the organization was forced to take the field in September with only eight of its companies filled, Tafel's commission was modified to that of lieutenant colonel on November 11, 1862. After the Perryville Campaign, Tafel's battalion was merged into the hard-luck Thirty-ninth Brigade, which was captured intact by Confederate General John Hunt Morgan at the Battle of Hartsville on December 7, 1862.

The 106th was thereafter paroled and sent to Columbus, Ohio, being formally exchanged on January 12, 1863. Tafel superintended the unit's re-organization at Camp Dennison. On March 24 the unit left for Lexington, Kentucky, to relieve the 103rd Ohio Infantry in suppressing guerrilla activity in Owen County. Tafel effectively brought an end to the depredations, earning "praise from the citizens and State authorities, for the good conduct and soldierly bearing of both officers and men."

The regiment arrived in Nashville on May 4, and four weeks later took up guard duty along the Louisville & Nashville Railroad, from Nashville north to the Kentucky border, operating out of Gallatin, Tennessee. At this time the unit had been formally assigned to the Third Brigade, Second Division, Reserve Corps, Army of the Cumberland. The guerrillas of the area suffered so consistently from the ambuscade tactics of the 106th that their leader, Captain Ellis Harper, offered a reward for Tafel's head. Harper's band was badly mauled on December 4, 1863, at Dry Fork in Sumner County, Tennessee, Harper himself escaping.

The growing skill and hardened reputation of the 106th Ohio under Tafel's leadership caused it to be reassigned to the garrison of Bridgeport, Alabama, on May 4, 1864, where it quickly displayed its refined "scouting" abilities in hounding the local guerrilla band of Rebel Captain Caperton throughout the Racoon Mountains. Caperton was killed by mounted scouts of the 106th on June 10. In October 1864, the 106th was finally recruited up to its full strength, officially attaining the status of a full, volunteer regiment.

Tafel and the 106th Ohio became cut off from all communication for a four weeks with Thomas's main army at Nashville when Confederate Lt. Gen. John B. Hood brought what was left of the Army of Tennessee back into Tennessee that same winter. In January 1865 the 106th fought one of its last actions of the war at Mud Creek, Tennessee, encountering a portion of the Rebel cavalry forces under Brig. Gen. Hylan B. Lyon. In June, the regiment was ordered back to Nashville for muster out, which occurred on June 29, 1865. Tafel's commission was never upgraded to that of a full colonel.

Tafel was a Democrat in his political views, and served three years as mayor of Cincinnati around the start of the 20th century. He died in Cincinnati and is buried in Spring Grove Cemetery. Elected as a reform candidate against the "Boss" system of George B. Cox, he championed civil service reform and the implementation of a merit system for city employees to curb political patronage. Throughout his life, he remained active in the Deutscher Pionier-Verein von Cincinnati, contributing numerous historical articles documenting the German-American experience. He died in Cincinnati and is buried in Spring Grove Cemetery. His daughter Marguerite (1891–1996) lived to the age of 105.

== See also ==
- German Americans in the Civil War

== Notes ==
Preceded by John A. Caldwell	Mayor of Cincinnati, Ohio; 1897–1900	Succeeded by Julius Fleischmann
