= George K. Nash =

American judge, 41st Governor of Ohio (1842–1904)

George Kilbon Nash
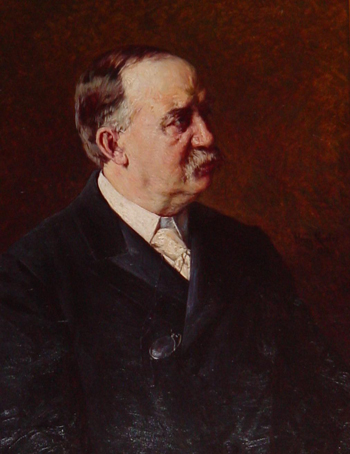
- 1905 portrait by Charles T. Webber

41st Governor of Ohio
- In office January 8, 1900 – January 11, 1904
- Lieutenant: John A. Caldwell; Carl L. Nippert; Harry L. Gordon
- Preceded by: Asa S. Bushnell
- Succeeded by: Myron T. Herrick

15th Ohio Attorney General
- In office January 12, 1880 – April 16, 1883
- Governor: Charles Foster
- Preceded by: Isaiah Pillars
- Succeeded by: David Hollingsworth

Personal details
- Born: August 14, 1842 Medina County, Ohio, U.S.
- Died: October 28, 1904 (aged 62) Columbus, Ohio, U.S.
- Resting place: Green Lawn Cemetery
- Party: Republican
- Spouse: Adeline Ayres
- Children: Mary Nash
- Education: Oberlin College
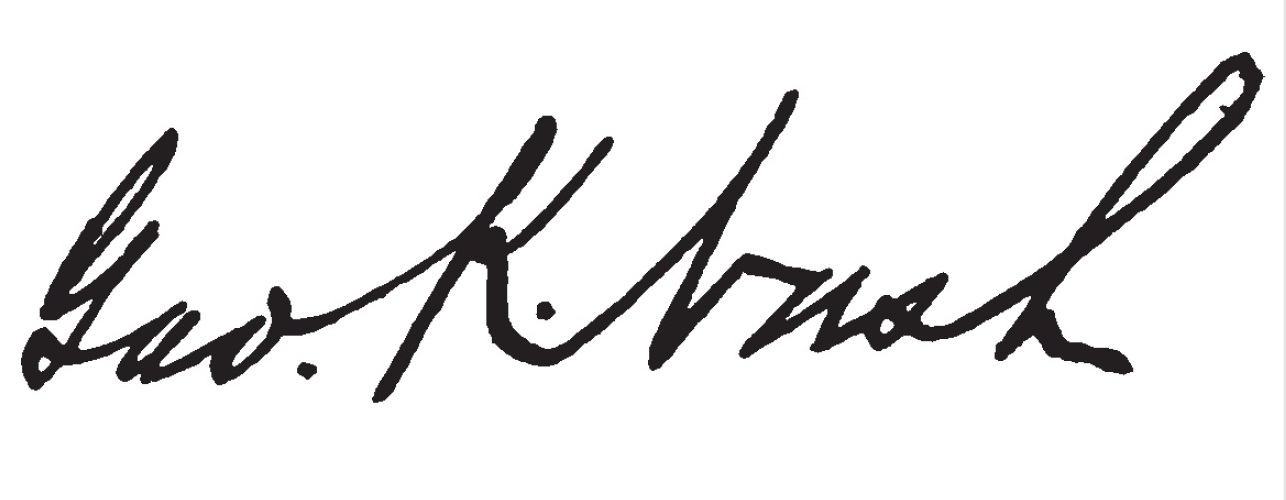
- Signature

Military service
- Allegiance: United States
- Branch/service: Union Army
- Unit: 150th Ohio Infantry
- Battles/wars: American Civil War

George Kilbon Nash (August 14, 1842 – October 28, 1904) was an American attorney and Republican politician from Ohio. He served as the 41st governor of Ohio.

== Biography ==
Nash was born in York Township, Medina County, Ohio. He attended the preparatory school at Western Reserve College. At 20 years of age he entered Oberlin College and stayed until his sophomore year, when he enlisted as a private in the One hundred fiftieth regiment of the Ohio National Guard of the Union Army during the Civil War. After the war he studied law in the offices of Robert B. Warden, who had been a justice of the Ohio Supreme Court. He was admitted to the bar in 1867 in Columbus, Ohio. He was elected prosecuting attorney of Franklin County, Ohio, in 1870, and re-elected in 1872. He re-entered private practice, and in 1876 lost a bid for Congress, and lost for Ohio Attorney General in 1877. In October, 1879, he was elected Ohio Attorney General. In 1881 he was re-elected. In 1883, he was appointed a member of the Supreme Court Commission of Ohio for two years. He then devoted time to lucrative private practice, including significant railroad litigation, and party politics. Nash served as Governor of Ohio from January 8, 1900, to January 11, 1904. He died months later in Columbus Ohio

== Story with Dick Price ==
The following story is written in the book by Al Jennings, Through the Shadows With O. Henry. A young inmate, Dick Price, was sentenced for life for repeated safe-cracking, in which he was a good specialist. Once there was a necessity to open a safe of a company, when keys were lost. George Nash promised to pardon Price, if he did it. Price cracked the safe, but Nash didn't pardon him, failing to fulfil his promise. Soon Price died in prison. His story was used by O. Henry in his story "A Retrieved Reformation".

According to other sources, the name of the safe-cracker was Jimmy Connors.

== Family ==
George K. Nash was the son of Asa Nash and Electa Branch Nash. They were farmers in Medina County, originally from Massachusetts. There were three sons and two daughters in the family. Nash married Mrs. William K. Deshler, (Adaline Ayres), April, 1882. She died October 17, 1886. They had one daughter, named Mary Nash, who died February 12, 1897. Both were interred in Green Lawn Cemetery, and Nash visited their graves and left flowers before each of his inaugurations. Governor Nash was also buried at Green Lawn.

== Notes ==
Legal offices
Preceded by Isaiah Pillars	Ohio Attorney General; 1880–1883	Succeeded by David Hollingsworth
Political offices
Preceded by Asa S. Bushnell	Governor of Ohio; 1900–1904	Succeeded by Myron T. Herrick
Party political offices
Preceded by Asa S. Bushnell	Republican Party nominee for Governor of Ohio; 1899, 1901	Succeeded by Myron T. Herrick
