= Battle of Hartsville =

Battle of the American Civil War

Coordinates: 36.3777°N 86.1743°W

- Part of the American Civil War
Date	December 7, 1862
Location	Hartsville, Tennessee
Result	Confederate victory

Belligerents
United States (Union)	(Confederate States of America) CSA (Confederacy)

Commanders and leaders
Absalom B. Moore (POW)	John Hunt Morgan

Units involved
XIV Corps	

Strength
2,400	1,300

Casualties and losses
2,096	139
- Hartsville Battlefield
- U.S. National Register of Historic Places
- U.S. Historic district
- Location within Tennessee Location within the United States
- Nearest city: Hartsville, Tennessee
- Area: 245 acres (99 ha)
- MPS: Tennessee Resources of the American Civil War MPS
- NRHP reference No.: 98001247
- Added to NRHP: October 28, 1998

The Battle of Hartsville was fought on December 7, 1862, in northern Tennessee at the opening of the Stones River Campaign the American Civil War. Hartsville Battlefield is listed on the National Register of Historic Places.

== Background ==
The Stones River Campaign started in early November 1862 when Union Maj. Gen. William S. Rosecrans moved his Army of the Cumberland southeast from Nashville, Tennessee, toward Murfreesboro. Confederate General Braxton Bragg, commanding the Army of Tennessee, had retreated there after his defeat at the Battle of Perryville. Bragg ordered Colonel John Hunt Morgan to move north with his cavalry and operate along Rosecrans's lines of communications, to prevent him from foraging for supplies north of Nashville. The action at Hartsville, a crossing point on the Cumberland River about 40 miles upstream from Nashville, north of Murfreesboro, was an incident in Morgan's raid to the north, before Rosecrans had the bulk of his infantry forces on the move.

== Battle ==
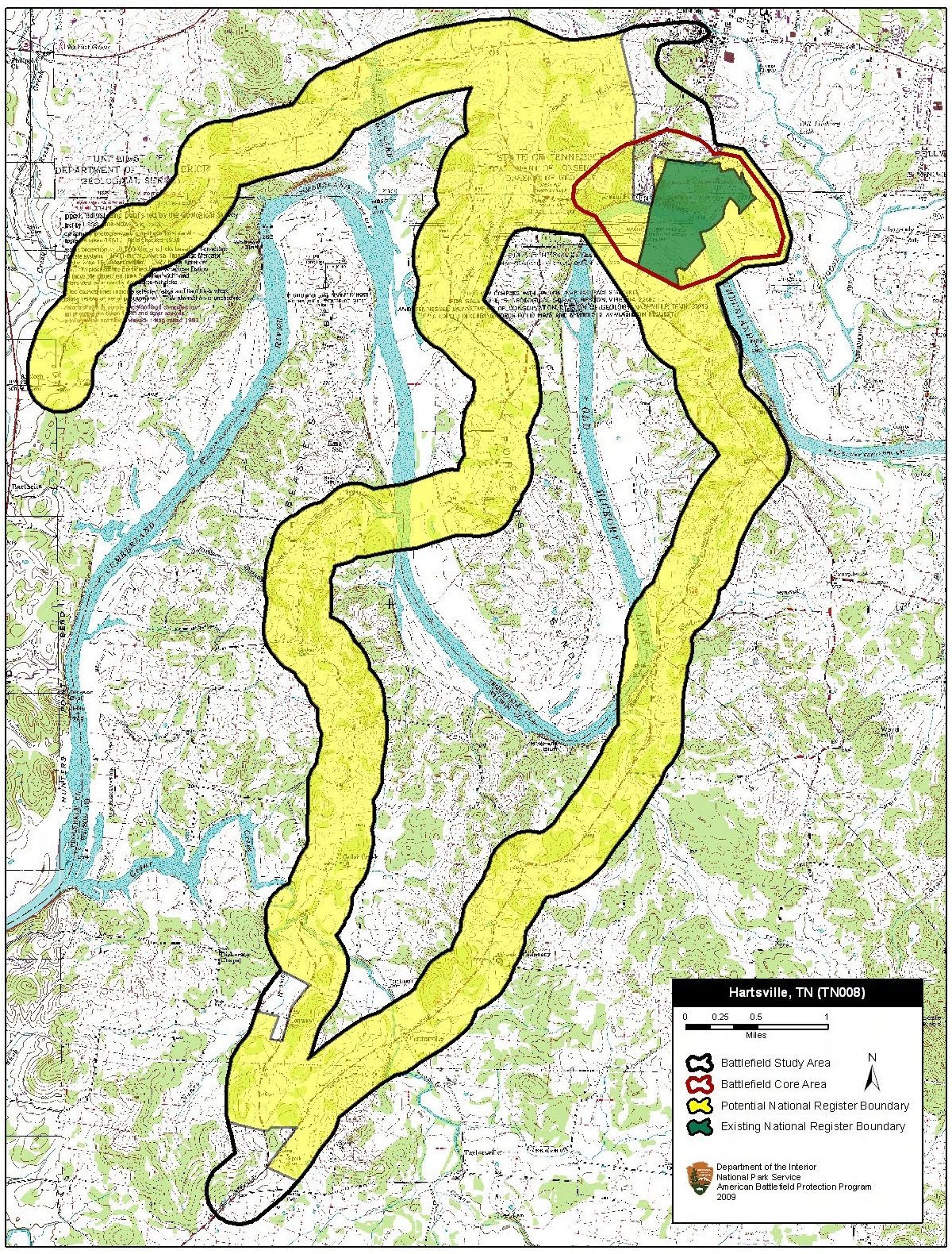
Map of Hartsville Battlefield core and study areas by the American Battlefield Protection Program.

Guarding the river crossing at Hartsville was the 39th Brigade, XIV Corps, Army of the Cumberland, consisting of the 106th Ohio Infantry, 108th Ohio Infantry, 104th Illinois Infantry, and 2nd Indiana Cavalry. The brigade was commanded by Col. Absalom B. Moore. Under the cover of darkness, Morgan crossed the river in the early morning of December 7, 1862, with about 1,300 men, mainly Kentuckians, outnumbered by about 1,000 troops by the Union brigade. Another Union force, three times that size, was encamped nine miles away at Castalian Springs, close enough to hear the guns, but too far away to take part.

Morgan's attack took the Union camp by surprise. One account indicates that the Confederates were able to get past the picket line by wearing blue uniforms, while another says they wore civilian clothes and posed as refugees. The attack began at 6:45 a.m. with a simultaneous artillery bombardment and an infantry attack, while the cavalry struck the flanks and rear. One of Moore's units broke and ran after an hour, which caused confusion and helped force the Federals to fall back. By 8:30 a.m., the Confederates had surrounded the Union soldiers, convincing Col. Moore to surrender.

== Aftermath ==
The Union 75th Indiana regiment was camped about 8 or 9 miles away at Castalian Springs. They marched to Hartsville after hearing cannons firing in the distance. Their advance was hesitant because they may have encountered the rear guard of Morgan's cavalry.

They reached the battlefield to find Union and Confederate casualties abandoned in the snow. The Union forces had already been defeated by the Morgan's combined light infantry, light artillery and cavalry. Some of Morgan's men were barefooted and inadequately clothed. They helped themselves to the Union supplies of shoes and filled several wagons with supplies. Reports gave the number of dead and wounded as about 200 combined.

Basil W. Duke, the Confederate field commander, wrote that fifteen Confederate soldiers “frozen so stiff” were left behind along with other wounded. The Union wounded were also left behind, while the 2,004 prisoners taken were marched south to Lebanon.

Duke wrote that the Confederates knew of the Union strength and even where they were deployed. Morgan thus took the precaution of deploying Quirk's Scouts and Cluke's regiment to impede any Union pursuit. The Confederates stepped up the pace, and some Union prisoners were forced to wade the Cumberland River or one of the smaller creeks.

Morgan inflicted 58 Union casualties, at the cost of 139 Confederate; however, he also left the battlefield with 1,844 Union prisoners and a wagon train heavily loaded with captured equipment and supplies. General Joseph E. Johnston, who was in overall command of Confederate forces in the Western Theater, called this a "brilliant feat" and recommended that Morgan be appointed brigadier general immediately. Jefferson Davis happened to be in the vicinity at Murfreesboro and promoted Morgan in person when he arrived.

The action at Hartsville foreshadowed the Confederate cavalry raids by Nathan Bedford Forrest into West Tennessee, December 1862 to January 1863, and by Morgan into Kentucky, from December 1862 to January 1863. Rosecrans arrived in Murfreesboro on December 29, setting the stage for the Battle of Stones River.
