= Alfred M. Cohen =

American lawyer, presidential elector, and politician

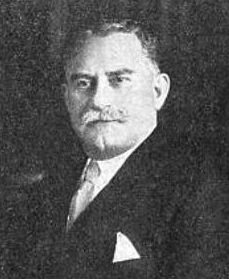

Member of the Ohio Senate
- In office 1897–1899

Personal details
- Born: Alfred Morton Cohen; October 19, 1859 Cincinnati, Ohio, US
- Died: March 9, 1949 (aged 89) Avondale, Ohio, US
- Resting place: United Jewish Cemetery
- Party: Democratic
- Spouse: Millie Phillips (m. 1889)
- Children: 3
- Education: University of Cincinnati College of Law
- Occupation: Lawyer

Alfred Morton Cohen (October 19, 1859 – March 9, 1949) was a Jewish-American lawyer and politician from Ohio. He served in the Ohio Senate.

== Early life ==
Cohen was born on October 19, 1859, in Cincinnati, Ohio, the son of Morton S. Cohen and Phebe Phillips. Although Cohen's parents were Orthodox, he was drawn to the Reform movement as a young man. He attended Cincinnati public schools and a school Isaac M. Wise established as a precursor to Hebrew Union College. When Cohen was twelve, Wise picked him as one of the first five students for Hebrew Union College. Cohen organized a local chapter of the YMHA in 1876 when he was only seventeen.

His interests then turned to law, and he instead went to the University of Cincinnati College of Law. He graduated from there with an LL.B. in 1880. One of his classmates was future President and Supreme Court Justice William Howard Taft, his lifelong friend and political foe. He was admitted to the bar six months after he graduated, when he reached the age of majority.

== Career ==
Cohen then formed a considerable law practice in Cincinnati and became a senior member of the law firm Cohen & Mack. He previously studied law in the office of Samuel F. Cary, and after he was admitted to the bar he formed a partnership with L. W. Goss. By 1917, he was senior member of the law firm Cohen, Mack & Hurtig. He specialized in corporation, commercial, and negligence cases. He was also president of the Peoples Bank & Savings Co. and the Bay Poplar Lumber Co.

Cohen served on the Cincinnati City Council for several terms, beginning when he was 25. A member of the Democratic Party, he was chairman of the convention that nominated Gustav Tafel for Mayor of Cincinnati and gave the keynote speech at that convention. In 1897, he was elected to the Ohio Senate as one of three senators from Ohio's 1st senatorial district (Hamilton County). He was re-elected to the Senate in 1899 as part of a Fusion ticket and was assigned Senate Minority Leader.

In 1900, he was the Fusion candidate for Mayor of Cincinnati, with support from the Democratic Party and Independent Republicans. He lost the election to Julius Fleischmann. Devoted to improving interracial relations, he was chairman of the Community Chest's Negro division and its successor the Urban League. When he was 85, he worked to suppress Jim Crow barriers in Cincinnati's hotels and bars and used his prestige to gain guarantees of unbiased services from local businesses.

He served as presidential elector in the 1912, 1916, 1932, 1936, 1940, and 1948 presidential elections. Although he served as a presidential elector six times and presided over the state's electoral college five of those times, he believed the electoral college was "obsolete for a century and a half" and should be replaced with a more modern system. He was selected to nominate Judson Harmon as Governor of Ohio, and when Harmon became governor he appointed Cohen Ohio's representative to the Uniform Law Commission.

== Honors ==
Cohen received an honorary Doctor of Hebrew Law degree from Hebrew Union College in 1929. In 1936, B'nai B'rith funded a colony in Mandatory Palestine called Moledet B'nai B'rith as a tribute to him.

== Personal life ==
In 1889, he married Millie Phillips. Their children were Ruth, Hannah, and Phillip.

Cohen helped organize a national YMHA organization in 1890, and he served as its president for several years. He was a member of B'nai B'rith for over 60 years, becoming president of the Cincinnati Lodge in 1906 and becoming the organization's international president from 1925 to 1938. In 1933, he was a founder of the Joint Consultive Council, which attempted to achieve Jewish unity in the fight against Nazism and consisted of B'nai B'rith, the American Jewish Committee, and the American Jewish Congress. He represented B'nai B'rith at the 1933 World Conference of Jews in London. In 1925, B'nai B'rith initiated the Hillel Foundation, which promoted religious and cultural consciousness among Jewish university and college students and had Cohen's support. He also supported the founding of Aleph Zadik Aleph, a junior B'nai B'rith that initiated young Jewish men into B'nai B'rith's fraternity and cultural activities. During his presidency of B'nai B'rith, the Anti-Defamation League emerged as its best-known branch.

He was a member of the Hebrew Union College's board of governors from 1901 until his death, chairman of the board of governors from 1918 to 1937, and honorary chairman from 1937 until his death. He was a member of the Freemasons, the Odd Fellows, and the Chamber of Commerce. He was an active member of Rockdale Avenue Temple from 1883 until his death, and in 1937 the congregation voted him its only honorary member. He was also an honorary member of the Protestant First United Church, which was across the street from his house and which he attended frequently.

Cohen died at home in Avondale on March 9, 1949. He was buried in United Jewish Cemetery.
