= Evanston, Cincinnati =

Coordinates: 39°08′26″N 84°28′20″W

Evanston O'Bryonville
- Neighborhood
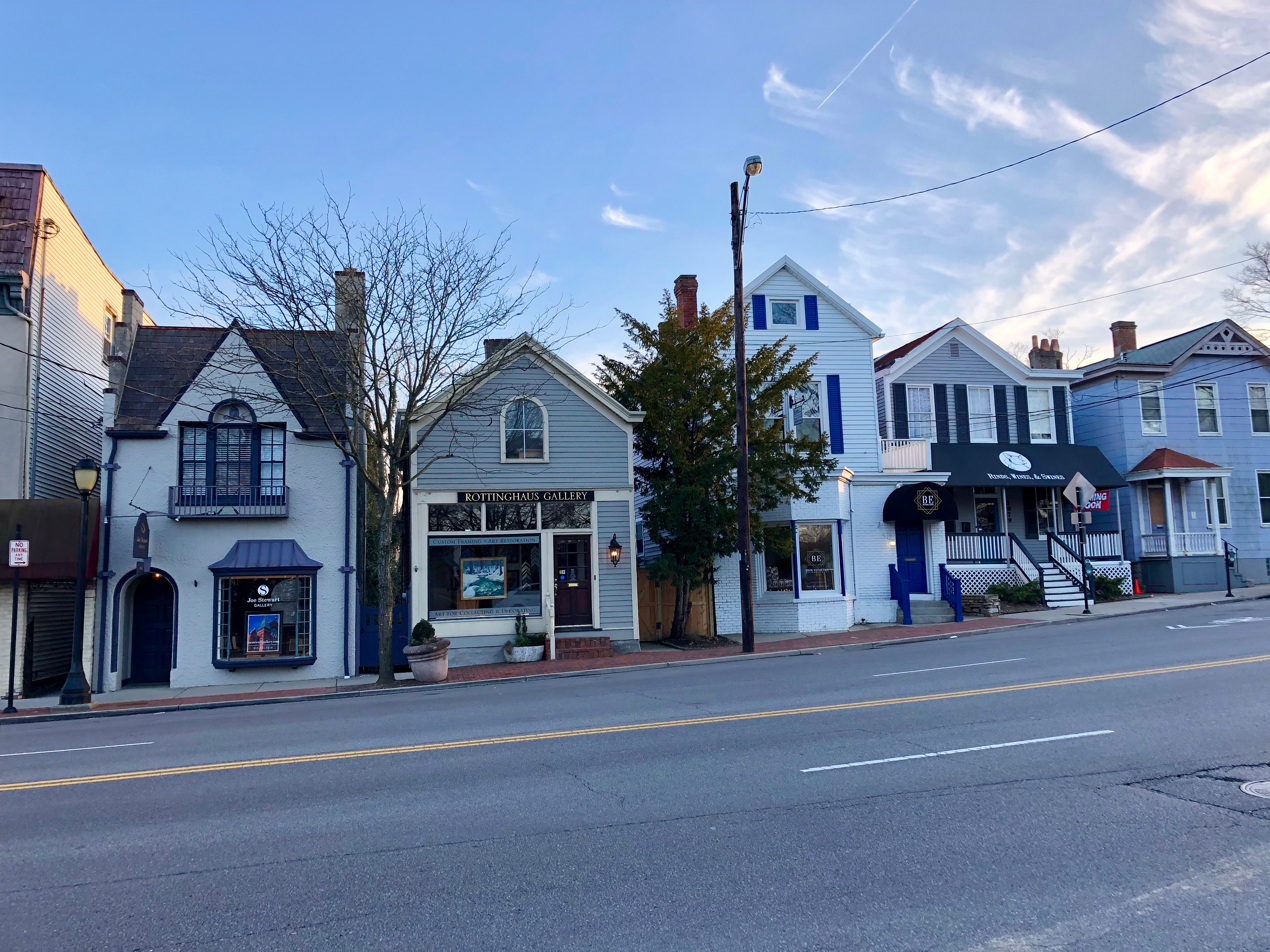
- Madison Road in Evanston

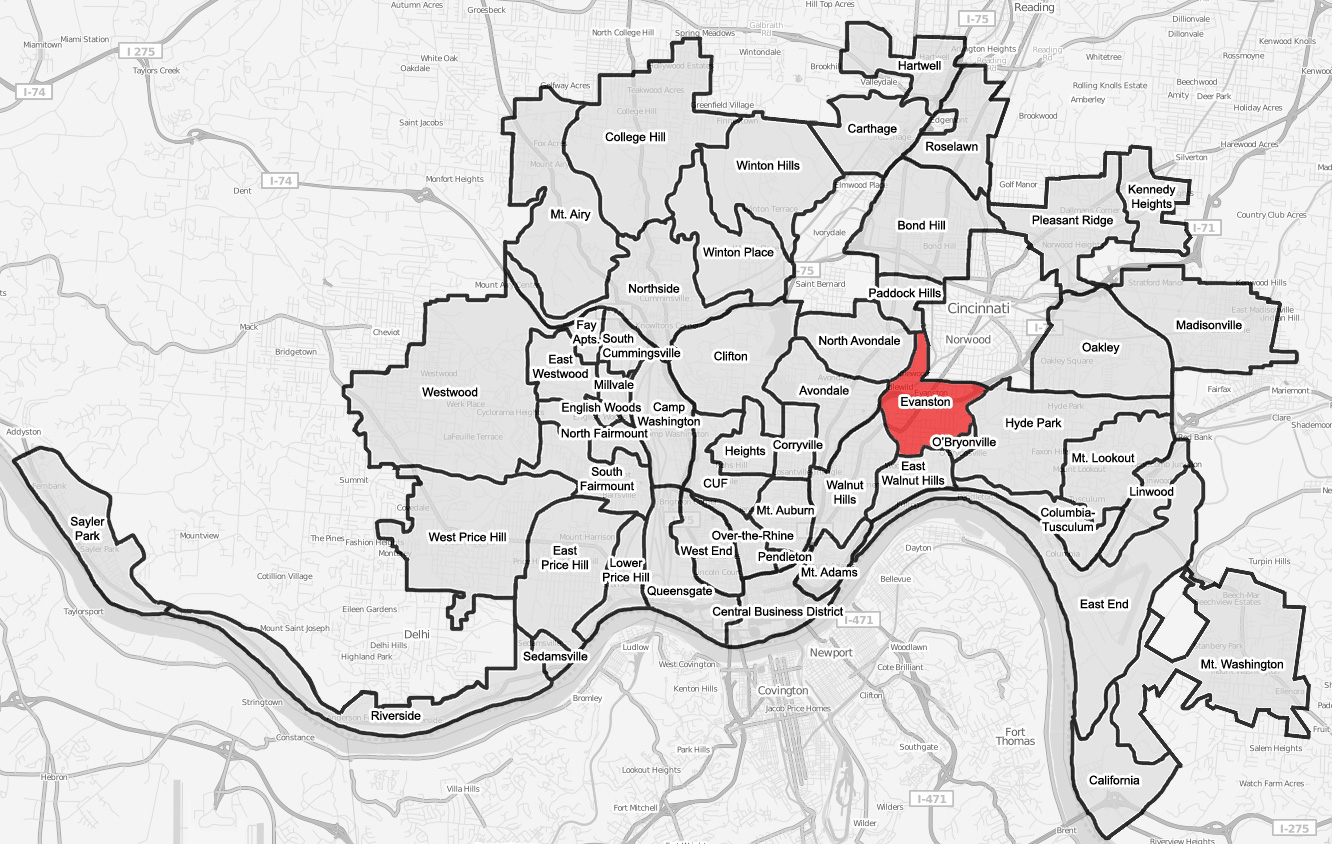
- Evanston (red) within Cincinnati, Ohio.
- Country: United States
- State: Ohio
- City: Cincinnati

Population (2020)
  - Total: 8,838

Evanston is one of the 52 neighborhoods of Cincinnati, Ohio. A mostly African-American neighborhood since the 1960s, it is known as "the educating community", and is bordered by the neighborhoods of East Walnut Hills, Hyde Park, North Avondale, and Walnut Hills, as well as the City of Norwood. The population was 8,838 at the 2020 census.

== History ==
The community was originally known as the village of Idlewood. It was renamed in 1893 after the city of Evanston, Illinois. Evanston was annexed to the City of Cincinnati on November 19, 1903.

Evanston's O'Bryonville business district was originally a separate suburb than Idlewood. O'Bryonville was annexed to the City of Cincinnati in 1870.

== Geography ==
Evanston is home to the O'Bryonville business district.

== Demographics ==
Population of Evanston 1900-2020
Year	Pop.	±%
1900	6,975	—
1910	11,786	+69.0%
1920	15,600	+32.4%
1930	16,094	+3.2%
1940	15,790	−1.9%
1950	16,582	+5.0%
1960	18,590	+12.1%
1970	14,896	−19.9%
1980	9,689	−35.0%
1990	8,386	−13.4%
2000	7,928	−5.5%
2010	9,158	+15.5%
2020	8,838	−3.5%

As of the census of 2020, there were 8,838 people living in the neighborhood. There were 3,713 housing units. The racial makeup of the neighborhood was 36.8% White, 53.8% Black or African American, 0.2% Native American, 1.8% Asian, 0.1% Pacific Islander, 1.4% from some other race, and 6.0% from two or more races. 3.5% of the population were Hispanic or Latino of any race.

There were 2,971 households, out of which 45.8% were families. 45.8% of all households were made up of individuals.

15.0% of the neighborhood's population were under the age of 18, 74.9% were 18 to 64, and 10.1% were 65 years of age or older. 45.9% of the population were male and 54.1% were female.

According to the U.S. Census American Community Survey, for the period 2016-2020 the estimated median annual income for a household in the neighborhood was $44,621. About 10.5% of family households were living below the poverty line. About 29.4% had a bachelor's degree or higher.

== Education ==
Xavier University, a Jesuit Catholic university, is located in Evanston.

== See also ==
- Coca-Cola Bottling Plant (Cincinnati, Ohio)
