= List of Ohio lieutenant gubernatorial elections =

Seal of the lieutenant governor of Ohio

The voters of the U.S. state of Ohio elect a lieutenant governor for a four-year term. Starting in 1978, the lieutenant governor is elected in tandem with the governor—votes earned on a governor-lieutenant governor ticket are indicated in parentheses.

== Democratic primaries ==
Year	Nominee	First runner-up	Other candidates
2002	Charleta B. Tavares: 467,572		
1998	Michael B. Coleman: 663,832		
1994	Peter Lawson Jones: 408,161	Paul Kent Myers: 286,276	
1990	Eugene Branstool: 683,932	Judy Wynn Parker: 131,564	Robert M. Galvin: 145; Sandra King (WI): 46
1986	Paul R. Leonard: 684,206	Barbara Arnold Massey (WI): 880	
1982	Myrl H. Shoemaker: 436,887	Charles A. Vanik: 383,007	Kenneth M. Keefe: 210,524
1978	Michael J. Dorrian: 491,524	Robert J. Strittmatter: 88,134	
1974	Richard F. Celeste: 298,952	Anthony O. Calabrese: 176,756	William M. O'Neill: 125,012; J. W. Brown: 121,112; A. William Sweeney: 71,172; James R. Williams: 53,422; Lucille Huston: 48,034; Henry W. Eckhart: 30,614; Don L. Hanni: 24,033
1970	Anthony O. Calabrese: 232,602	A. William Sweeney: 185,086	Ray T. Miller Jr.: 93,062; James D. Nolan: 91,918; John J. Gill: 84,513; Robert E. Hagan: 70,320; Perry Mason: 53,350
1966	William L. Coleman: 263,508	Paul J. Lynch: 227,692	
1962	John J. Gallagher: 174,030	James A. Lantz: 117,010	James L. Powers: 92,701; John T. Flanigan: 89,790; Harold L. Milligan: 70,436
1958	John W. Donahey: 175,907	John J. Gallagher: 154,032	John W. Peck: 76,898; Franklin E. Smith: 57,817; Charles H. Hubbell: 46,957; Albert T. Ball: 25,590; Roy E. Hopple: 18,236
1956	John Taylor: 225,844	R. Edward Tepe: 99,002	Roy H. Burry: 67,176
1954	George D. Nye: 169,779	Herbert S. Duffy: 105,126	John Taylor: 44,555
1952	George D. Nye: 414,672		
1950	George D. Nye: 272,912	John F. Cantwell: 101,399	
1948	George D. Nye: 322,237		
1946	George D. Nye: 225,950		
1944	George D. Nye: 124,747	Reed M. Winegardner: 77,588;	N. A. Wilcox: 48,792
1942	George D. Nye: 157,718	Reed M. Winegardner: 96,907	
1940	Robert S. Cox: 86,044	Reed M. Winegardner: 54,063	Charles H. Hubbell: 49,643; John Taylor: 47,656; John W. Pattison: 41,347; William H. Whetro: 39,423; Mark E. Moore: 38,215; Ed P. Buckmeyer: 27,554; James F. Coady: 20,222; Price Janson: 16,575; Harry J. Halper: 14,043

== General election ==
Year	Democratic	Republican	Other
2010	Yvette McGee Brown : 1,812,047	Mary Taylor : 1,889,180	Ann Leach : 92,116; M. Anita Rios : 58,475
2006	Lee Fisher : 2,307,420	Tom Raga : 1,406,729	Anita Rios (G) : 38,769
2002	Charleta B. Tavares: 1,236,924	Jennette B. Bradley: 1,865,007	
1998	Michael B. Coleman: 1,498,956	Maureen O'Connor: 1,678,721	Lawrence Anderson: 111,468; John A. Eastman: 65,068
1994	Peter Lawson Jones: 835,849	Nancy P. Hollister: 2,401,572	Norm Myers: 108,745; Luther E. Willis (WI): 48; Kibwe Diarra (WI): 24
1990	Eugene Branstool: 1,539,416	R. Michael DeWine: 1,938,103	Margaret Husk: 82; Henry King: 49
1986	Paul R. Leonard: 1,858,372	Robert A. Taft II: 1,207,264	Katie S. Smith (WI): 803; Lottie May Sulzer (WI): 92; Mark J. Rahn (WI): 80
1982	Myrl H. Shoemaker: 1,981,882	James E. Betts: 1,303,962	Lee Paolini (L): 39,114; John N. Salierno: 17,484; Rachel H. Knapik: 14,279; Jesse Menefee (WI): 7
1978	Michael J. Dorrian: 1,354,631	George V. Voinovich: 1,402,167	John M. Gaige: 35,164; Conrad Gutermuth: 29,413; Bruce Wood: 21,951; Johnnie Menefee Jr. (WI): 25
1974	Richard F. Celeste: 1,513,619	John W. Brown: 1,296,322	Herman Kirsch: 110,776; Bernard Henderson (WI): 39
1970	Anthony O. Calabrese: 1,399,651	John W. Brown: 1,554,837	Herman Kirsch (WI): 92
1966	William L. Coleman: 1,085,033	John W. Brown: 1,647,677	
1962	John J. Gallagher: 1,303,047	John W. Brown: 1,629,158	
1958	John W. Donahey: 1,692,249	Paul M. Herbert: 1,401,694	
1956	John Taylor: 1,446,882	Paul M. Herbert: 1,899,219	
1954	George D. Nye: 1,209,853	John William Brown : 1,240,555	
1952	George D. Nye: 1,647,185	John William Brown: 1,688,938	
1950	George D. Nye: 1,355,570	J. Eugene Roberts: 1,325,977	
1948	George D. Nye: 1,474,969	Paul M. Herbert: 1,354,579	
1946	George D. Nye: 972,622	Paul M. Herbert: 1,208,400	Peter M. Kapitz (SL): 10,492
1944	George D. Nye: 1,519,250	M. Herbert Hoover: 1,430,246	
1942	George D. Nye: 647,539	Paul M. Herbert: 1,018,504	
1940	Robert S. Cox: 1,398,012	Paul M. Herbert: 1,631,469	
1922	Earl D. Bloom : 766,397	William Chatfield, Jr. : 753,696	
1920	Howell Wright : 772,377	Clarence J. Brown : 1,117,550	O.G. VanSchoyck : 43,119; W.O. Blase : 1,465
1916	Earl D. Bloom : 571,095	John H. Arnold : 540,766	George Bundy : 37,729; Charles F. Bacon : 6,865
1912	Hugh L. Nichols	Beecher W. Waltmire	L. J. Tabor (Progressive)
1910	Atlee Pomerene	Francis W. Treadway	
1908	David L. Rockwell : 528,698	Francis W. Treadway : 548,442	Julius Zorn (Soc) : 30,763; George H. Creamer (Pro) : 9,913; James A. McKitrick (Ind) : 435; Charles W. Baughman (Peo) : 151; John E. Steiger (Soc Lab) : 839
1905	Lewis B. Houck : 427,162	Andrew L. Harris : 456,341	Walter C. Gunthrup (Soc) : 18,103; Willis E. Foltz (Pro) : 13,707; John R. Fraser (Soc Lab) : 1,840
1903	Frank B. Niles : 357,573	Warren G. Harding : 474,311	Michael J. Hynes (Soc) 14,054; Joseph M. Scott (Pro) : 13,491; David F. Cronin (Soc Lab) : 2,176
1901	Anthony Howells	Carl L. Nippert	
1899	A. W. Patrick	John A. Caldwell	
1897	Melville D. Shaw : 400,946	Asa W. Jones : 427,966	John Danner : 7,591; Horace Whitcomb : 5,942; Albert E. Merrill : 1,538; Daniel W. Wallace : 4,235; Jason M. Tilley : Thomas M. Hillman : 3,124
1895	John B. Peaslee: 331,521	Asa W. Jones : 425,781	
1893	William A. Taylor : 347,593	Andrew L. Harris : 423,873	
1891	William V. Marquis : 346,892	Andrew L. Harris : 373,953	
1889	William V. Marquis: 375,068	Elbert L. Lampson : 375,090	
1887	De Witt L. Coolman: 328,189	William C. Lyon : 356,932	
1885	John George Warwick: 341,809	Robert P. Kennedy : 360,720	
1883	John George Warwick : 356,413	William G. Rose : 350,009	
1881	Edgar M. Johnson : 288,266	Rees G. Richards : 314,100	
1879	Americus V. Rice : 319,542	Andrew Hickenlooper : 335,140	
1877	Jabez W. Fitch : 268,606	Ferdinand Vogeler: 241,437	
1875	Samuel Fenton Cary : 287,986	Thomas Lowry Young : 297,931	
1873	Barnabas Burns: 213,593	Alphonso Hart : 214,228	
1871	Samuel Furman Hunt : 217,982	Jacob Mueller : 236,892	
1869	Thomas J. Godfrey : 228,269	John C. Lee : 236,297	
1867	Daniel S Uhl : 240,845	John C. Lee : 243,486	
1865	William Lang: 193,510	Andrew McBurney : 224,943	
1863	George E. Pugh : 187,737	Charles Anderson : 285,474	
1861	John G. Marshall : 151,978	Benjamin Stanton : 206,995	
1859	William H. Safford: 170,587	Robert C. Kirk : 185,334	
1857	William H. Lytle: 158,826	Martin Welker : 160,751	
1855	James Myers: 134,385	Thomas H. Ford : 169,408	
1853	James Myers : 147,905	Goodsell Buckingham (Freesoil) : 1,325	Isaac J. Allen (Whig) : 127,282
1851	William Medill : 146,053	Nicholas Spindler (Freesoil) : 15,839	Ephraim R. Eckley (Whig) : 119,984
