= M. Herbert Hoover =

American politician (died 1952)

- Born: Marion Herbert Hoover; April 29, 1891; Pickaway County, Ohio, U.S.
- Died: March 12, 1952 (aged 60); Columbus, Ohio, U.S.
- Resting place: South Bloomfield Cemetery; South Bloomfield, Ohio, U.S.
- Occupations: Politician; salesman
- Political party: Republican
- Spouse(s): Julia (m. 1914; div. 1952) Lois C. (m. 1937; div. 1952)
- Children: 2

Marion Herbert Hoover (known as M. Herbert Hoover or Herbert Hoover; April 29, 1891 – March 12, 1952) of Akron, Ohio, was an American politician of the Republican party who ran unsuccessfully for a number of elective offices in Ohio. In 1944, Hoover was the Republican nominee in the election for Lieutenant Governor of Ohio.

Despite his name, he was not related to Herbert Hoover, the president of the United States from 1929 to 1933. Starting with the 1940 campaign, he dropped his first initial for campaign purposes, calling himself only "Herbert Hoover".

== Early life ==
Marion Herbert Hoover was born on April 29, 1891, in Pickaway County, Ohio.

== Career ==
Hoover was a Republican. In 1925, Hoover lost a race for a seat on the Akron city council. In 1926, he declared his intention to run for Ohio State Treasurer, but failed to get the Republican nomination. In 1934 and 1936, Hoover ran for an at-large seat in the United States House of Representatives but lost in the Republican party primary. From 1937 to 1938, Hoover worked as an inspector for the Ohio liquor control department. In 1938, he again failed to get his party's nomination for Ohio State Treasurer. From 1939 to 1940, Hoover worked as an examiner for Ohio's Department of Taxation. In 1940, Hoover unsuccessfully ran for Ohio State Auditor. In 1942, Hoover was working for a pension office. He lost his job when he failed to sit for the civil service examination. Hoover attempted to unseat his fellow Republican, the incumbent Governor of Ohio John W. Bricker, by entering the Republican primary. However, Hoover's petitions failed to meet state election standards when many of the signatures were ruled unacceptable. It is rumored that Hoover challenged the popular, four-term incumbent in retaliation for the civil service rules that had cost him his pension office job.

By 1944, Hoover had moved to Columbus, Ohio, and that year he won the Republican nomination for Lieutenant Governor of Ohio, but he lost in the general election to George D. Nye. In 1946, he failed to get the Republican nomination for Ohio Secretary of State. In 1950, he ran again for Ohio State Treasurer and lost. At the time of his death, he was a salesman for Modern Roofing Company in Columbus.

== Personal life ==
Hoover married Julia in 1914. He did not divorce his wife before marrying Lois C. in 1937. He divorced both in 1952. He had a son and daughter, Jack and Mrs. Kenneth Tarkington. He was a member of the Broad Street Christian Church.

Hoover died on March 12, 1952, in Columbus. He was buried at South Bloomfield Cemetery in South Bloomfield.

== See also ==
- List of Ohio lieutenant gubernatorial elections

Party political offices
Preceded by Paul M. Herbert	Republican nominee for Lieutenant Governor of Ohio; 1944	Succeeded by Paul M. Herbert
