= 1974 Ohio lieutenant gubernatorial election =

- November 5, 1974
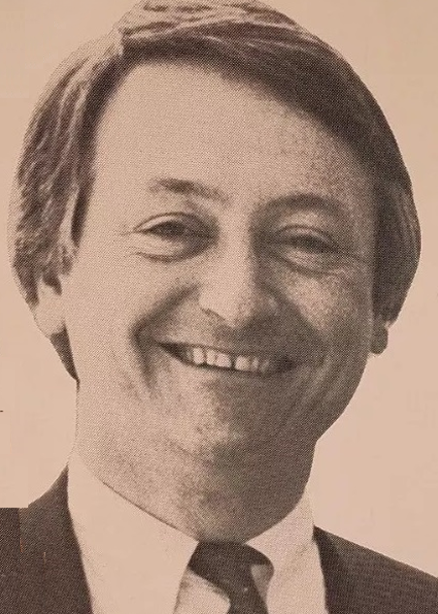

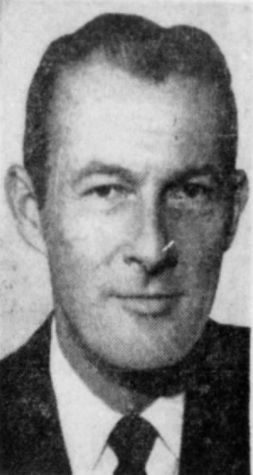
Nominee	Dick Celeste	John William Brown
Party	Democratic	Republican
Popular vote	1,513,619	1,296,322
Percentage	51.82%	44.38%
- County results Celeste: 40–50% 50–60% 60–70% Brown: 40–50% 50–60% 60–70%
Lieutenant Governor before election
John William Brown
Republican
Elected Lieutenant Governor
Dick Celeste
Democratic

The 1974 Ohio lieutenant gubernatorial election was held on November 5, 1974, to elect the lieutenant governor of Ohio. Democratic Ohio House Representative Dick Celeste defeated incumbent Republican Lieutenant Governor John William Brown.

In 1976, following the passage of a voter-approved amendment, the elections for governor and lieutenant governor of Ohio were merged into one ticket. Thus, this race is the last election in which an Ohio governor and lieutenant governor were elected separately. Additionally, this election coincided with the 1974 Ohio gubernatorial election, in which former Republican Governor Jim Rhodes narrowly defeated Democratic incumbent Governor John J. Gilligan, making this the last election in which an Ohio governor and lieutenant governor of separate political parties were simultaneously elected.

== Republican primary ==
=== Candidates ===
- John William Brown, incumbent lieutenant governor of Ohio (1963–1975), (1953–1957)

=== Campaign ===
The Republican primary was held on May 7, 1974. Brown won renomination unanimously.

=== Results ===
Republican primary results
Party	Candidate	Votes	%
Republican	John William Brown	474,818	100%
Total votes		474,818	100.0%

== Democratic primary ==
=== Candidates ===
- J. W. Brown
- Anthony O. Calabrese, Ohio state senator (1956–1980)
- Dick Celeste, Ohio House representative (1971–1974)
- Henry W. Eckhart
- Don L. Hanni
- Lucille Huston
- William M. O'Neill
- A. William Sweeney
- James R. Williams, lawyer

=== Campaign ===
The Democratic primary was held on May 7, 1974. The primary campaign field was crowded, with eight candidates running for the nomination, Celeste ultimately won with a plurality of the popular vote.

=== Results ===
Democratic primary results
Party	Candidate	Votes	%
Democratic	Dick Celeste	298,952	31.5%
Democratic	Anthony O. Calabrese	176,756	18.62%
Democratic	William M. O`Neill	125,012	13.17%
Democratic	J. W. Brown	121,112	12.76%
Democratic	A. William Sweeney	71,172	7.5%
Democratic	James R. Williams	53,422	5.63%
Democratic	Lucille Huston	48,034	5.06%
Democratic	Henry W. Eckhart	30,614	3.23%
Democratic	Don L. Hanni	24,033	2.53%
Total votes		949,107	100.0%

== General election ==
=== Candidates ===
- John William Brown, incumbent lieutenant governor of Ohio (1963–1975) (1953–1957)
- Dick Celeste, Ohio House representative (1971–1974) (Democratic)
- Bernard Henderson (write-in)
- Herman Kirsch (Independent)

=== Results ===
1974 Ohio lieutenant gubernatorial election results
Party	Candidate	Votes	%	±%
Democratic	Dick Celeste	1,513,619	51.82%	+4.45%
Republican	John William Brown	1,296,322	44.38%	−8.24%
Independent	Herman Kirsch	110,776	3.79%	N/A
Write-in	Bernard Henderson	39	0.00%	N/A
Total votes		2,920,756	100.0%	
Democratic gain from Republican				
