= Ohio's 22nd senatorial district =

American legislative district

Ohio's 22nd State Senate district
Senator
Mark Romanchuk; R–Ontario
- Demographics: 88.6% White; 5.1% Black; 2.2% Hispanic; 1.4% Asian; 2% Native American; 0.1% Hawaiian/Pacific Islander
- Population (2020) • Voting age • Citizens of voting age: 359,853; 280,739; 272,775

Ohio's 22nd senatorial district has historically been based in north central Ohio. It now consists of the counties of Medina, Ashland, Richland, and a portion of Holmes County. It encompasses Ohio House districts 2, 69 and 70. It has a Cook PVI of R+18. Its Ohio Senator is Republican Mark Romanchuk.

== List of senators ==
Senator	Party	Term	Notes
Anthony O. Calabrese	Democrat	January 3, 1957 – December 31, 1980	Calabrese lost reelection in 1980 to Ben Skall.
Ben Skall	Republican	January 3, 1981 – May 20, 1984	Skall was redistricted out of his district and resigned in 1984 prior to the expiration of his term.
Grace L. Drake	Republican	May 20, 1984 – December 31, 2000	Drake was term-limited in 2000.
Ron Amstutz	Republican	January 3, 2001 – December 31, 2008	Amstutz was term-limited in 2008.
Bob Gibbs	Republican	January 5, 2009 – December 31, 2010	Gibbs resigned in 2010 after winning election to the United States Congress.
Larry Obhof	Republican	February 2, 2011 – December 31, 2020	Obhof was term-limited in 2020.
Mark Romanchuk	Republican	January 4, 2021 – present	Incumbent
