= 1962 Ohio lieutenant gubernatorial election =

- November 6, 1962
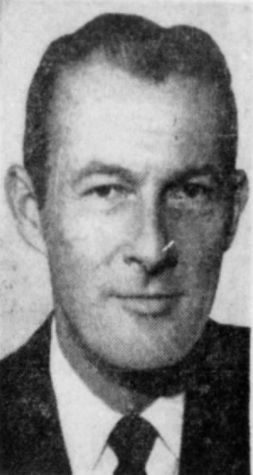

Nominee	John William Brown	John J. Gallagher
Party	Republican	Democratic
Popular vote	1,629,158	1,303,047
Percentage	55.56%	44.44%
Lieutenant Governor before election
John W. Donahey
Democratic
Elected Lieutenant Governor
John William Brown
Republican

The 1962 Ohio lieutenant gubernatorial election was held on November 6, 1962, to elect the lieutenant governor of Ohio. Primaries were held on May 8, 1962. Democratic incumbent lieutenant governor John W. Donahey chose to unsuccessfully run for Ohio State Auditor rather than seek re-election. Republican former governor John William Brown won the election, defeating his Democratic opponent John J. Gallagher by eleven percentage points.

== Democratic primary ==
=== Candidates ===
- John T. Flanigan
- John J. Gallagher
- James A. Lantz, Ohio State Auditor (1962–1963)
- Harold L. Milligan
- James L. Powers

=== Campaign ===
John J. Gallagher won a crowded primary 10 points ahead of his closest opponent, Ohio State Auditor James A. Lantz.

=== Results ===
Democratic primary results
Party	Candidate	Votes	%
Democratic	John J. Gallagher	174,030	31.99%
Democratic	James A. Lantz	117,010	21.51%
Democratic	James L. Powers	92,701	17.04%
Democratic	John T. Flanigan	89,790	16.51%
Democratic	Harold L. Milligan	70,436	12.95%
Total votes		543,967	100.0%

== Republican primary ==
=== Candidates ===
- William R. Van Aken, former Ohio State House representative (1947–1948), (1943–1944)
- John William Brown, former governor of Ohio (1957), and former lieutenant governor (1953–1957)
- William T. Weisenborn
- Charles W. Whalen Jr., Ohio state senator (1961–1967)
- Wayne Wilke, attorney
- George V. Woodling

=== Campaign ===
Despite facing a crowded primary, Brown easily won the Republican nomination in a landslide over his five opponents, winning by 32 percentage points.

=== Results ===
Republican primary results
Party	Candidate	Votes	%
Republican	John William Brown	257,261	47.91%
Republican	Charles W. Whalen Jr.	85,119	15.85%
Republican	George V. Woodling	70,827	13.19%
Republican	Wayne Wilke	63,669	11.86%
Republican	Charles W. Whalen Jr.	44,146	8.22%
Republican	William T. Weisenborn	15,971	2.97%
Total votes		536,993	100.0%

== General election ==
=== Candidates ===
- John William Brown, former governor of Ohio (1957), and former lieutenant governor (1953–1957) (Republican)
- John J. Gallagher (Democratic)

=== Results ===
1962 Ohio lieutenant gubernatorial election results
Party	Candidate	Votes	%	±%
Republican	John William Brown	1,629,158	55.56%	+10.26
Democratic	John J. Gallagher	1,303,047	44.44%	−10.26
Total votes		2,932,205	100.00%	
Republican gain from Democratic				
