= Walter Washington (disambiguation) =

Walter Washington (1915–2003) was an American politician.

Walter Washington may also refer to:

- Walter Washington (educator) (1923–1999), American pioneer educator born in Mississippi
- Walter "Wolfman" Washington (1943–2022), American blues guitarist based in New Orleans, Louisiana
