= Freeman Davis =

Freeman Davis may refer to:

- Brother Bones (Freeman Davis, 1902–1974), American whistling and bone playing recording artist
- Freeman Davis (soldier) (1842–1899), American Civil War soldier
