= Skall =

Skall is a surname. Notable people with the surname include:

- Ben Skall (1919–1993), American politician
- William V. Skall (1897–1976), American cinematographer
