= 1970 Ohio lieutenant gubernatorial election =

- November 3, 1970
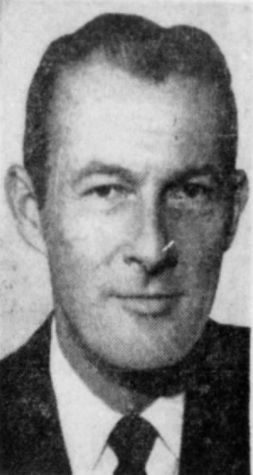

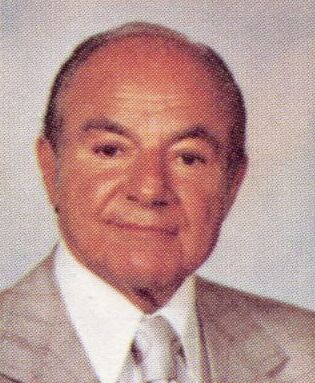
| Nominee | John William Brown | Anthony O. Calabrese |
| Party | Republican | Democratic |
| Popular vote | 1,554,837 | 1,399,651 |
| Percentage | 52.62% | 47.37% |
- County results Brown: 50–60% 60–70% 70–80% Calabrese: 50–60%
Lieutenant Governor before election
John William Brown
Republican
Elected Lieutenant Governor
John William Brown
Republican

The 1970 Ohio lieutenant gubernatorial election was held on November 3, 1970, to elect the Lieutenant Governor of Ohio. Republican incumbent John William Brown defeated Democratic challenger, Ohio State Senator and Minority Leader of the Ohio Senate Anthony O. Calabrese, with 52.62% of the vote.

== Republican primary ==
=== Candidates ===
- John William Brown, incumbent Lieutenant Governor of Ohio (1963–1975), (1953–1957)

=== Campaign ===
The Republican primary was held on May 5, 1970. Brown won renomination without opposition.

=== Results ===
Republican primary results
| Party | Candidate | Votes | % |
|---|---|---|---|
| Republican | John William Brown | 733,229 | 100% |
| Total votes | | 733,229 | 100.0% |

== Democratic primary ==
=== Candidates ===
- Anthony O. Calabrese, Ohio State Senator (1956–1970), and Minority Leader of the Ohio Senate (1969–1975)
- A. William Sweeney, lawyer
- Ray T. Miller Jr.
- James D. Nolan
- John J. Gill
- Robert E. Hagan
- Perry Mason

=== Campaign ===
The Democratic primary was held on May 5, 1970. Calabrese won a crowded primary with 28.69% of the vote.

=== Results ===
Democratic primary results
| Party | Candidate | Votes | % |
|---|---|---|---|
| Democratic | Anthony O. Calabrese | 232,602 | 28.69% |
| Democratic | A. William Sweeney | 185,086 | 22.83% |
| Democratic | Ray T. Miller Jr. | 93,062 | 11.48% |
| Democratic | James D. Nolan | 91,918 | 11.34% |
| Democratic | John J. Gill | 84,513 | 10.42% |
| Democratic | Robert E. Hagan | 70,320 | 8.67% |
| Democratic | Perry Mason | 53,350 | 6.58% |
| Total votes | | 810,851 | 100.0% |

== General election ==
=== Candidates ===
- John William Brown, incumbent Lieutenant Governor of Ohio (1963–1975), (1953–1957) (Republican)
- Anthony O. Calabrese, Ohio State Senator (1956–1970), and Minority Leader of the Ohio Senate (1969–1975) (Democratic)
- Herman Kirsch (Write-in)

=== Results ===
1970 Ohio lieutenant gubernatorial election results
| Party | Candidate | Votes | % | ±% |
|---|---|---|---|---|
| Republican | John William Brown | 1,554,837 | 52.62% | −7.67% |
| Democratic | Anthony O. Calabrese | 1,399,651 | 47.37% | +7.66% |
| Write-in | Herman Kirsch | 92 | 0.00% | N/A |
| Total votes | | 2,954,580 | 100.0% | |
| Republican hold | | Swing | | |
