= OH-22 =

OH-22 may refer to:

- Ohio's 22nd congressional district
- Ohio's 22nd senatorial district
- U.S. Route 22 in Ohio, the only Ohio highway numbered 22 since 1927
- Ohio State Route 22 (1923-1927)
