= Peter Lawson Jones =

American actor and politician (born 1952)

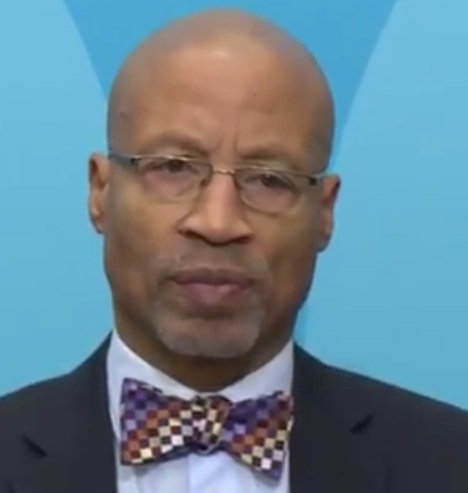

Member of the Ohio House of Representatives from the 11th district
- In office January 3, 1997 – February 9, 2002
- Preceded by: Jane Campbell
- Succeeded by: Lance Mason

Personal details
- Born: Peter Lawson Jones; December 23, 1952 (age 73) Cleveland, Ohio, U.S.
- Party: Democratic
- Spouse: Lisa Payne
- Education: Harvard University (AB, JD)

Peter Lawson Jones (born December 23, 1952) is an American actor, philanthropist and politician of the Democratic party. A resident of Shaker Heights, Ohio, he formerly served as a county commissioner in Cuyahoga County.

== Early years ==
Jones was born December 23, 1952, to Charles Whitman Jones and Margaret "Diane" Jones, who paid twenty percent over asking - the black tax - to buy a house in Shaker Heights. When asked to not pay the higher fee, his mother was said to have responded, "My son is going to Shaker schools because I understand they’re very good." He received his AB magna cum laude from Harvard University in 1975, and his juris doctor from Harvard in 1980. He was admitted to the Ohio State Bar in November 1980.

== Political career ==
Jones served on the Shaker Heights city council, and in 1994, he was the running mate for gubernatorial candidate Rob Burch. He served as a state representative from 1997 to 2002. In February 2002, after county commissioner Jane Campbell was elected mayor of Cleveland, the Cuyahoga County Democratic Party appointed Jones to replace her on the commission.

Jones has extensive professional and community affiliations, and works at the law firm Roetzel & Andress in addition to his legislative duties.

In 2007, Jones made news with two dissenting votes on major decisions. He opposed the sales tax increase for Cuyahoga County from 7.5% to 7.75%. The tax, earmarked to pay for a new convention center and medical mart, was passed by a 2–1 vote (Jimmy Dimora and Tim Hagan voted for it), and it took effect on October 1, 2007. Jones also opposed the demolition of the Ameritrust Tower, which the county bought as a potential location for a new administration building, but later decided to sell.

On January 26, 2009, WKYC's Tom Beres reported that Jones was considering running for the U.S. Senate seat being vacated by the retiring Sen. George Voinovich. He decided not to run and then endorsed Lee Fisher in both the primary and the general election.

In November 2009, the voters of Cuyahoga County replaced the county commission form of government with a charter form of government with an elected county executive.

== Acting career ==
After loosening his ties to the political realm, Jones started acting in many independent films in the Cleveland area.

== Philanthropy ==
Jones created the Charles & Margaret Jones Scholarship Fund at College Now Greater Cleveland in honor of his late parents' legacy and commitment to education.

== Filmography ==
=== Film ===
Year	Title	Role	Notes
2011	Battle Hill	Supporting	
2012	Alex Cross	Voice Over	
2014	Infinite Regression	Ted Adkins	
2019	The Assassin's Code	Portrait-Hanging Workman	
2021	Chicago Fire, Episode 904, Funny What Things Remind Us	Henry Sidwell	
2022	A Man Called Otto	Reuben	
2026	The Last Shop on Walnut	Marvin Statler	

=== Television ===
Year	Title	Role	Notes
2011	Detroit 1-8-7	Supporting	1 episode

== Playwright ==
Year	Title	Notes
1975	The Family Line	
2016	The Bloodless Jungle	
2022	The Phoenix Society	

== See also ==
- List of Ohio lieutenant gubernatorial elections

Party political offices
Preceded by Eugene Branstool	Democratic nominee for Lieutenant Governor of Ohio; 1994	Succeeded by Michael B. Coleman
