= Silas J. Williams =

American politician (died 1908)

Member of the Ohio Senate from the 21st district
- In office 1896–1899
- Preceded by: Harvey J. Eckley
- Succeeded by: George W. Wilhelm

Personal details
- Died: June 1, 1908
- Occupation: Politician

Silas J. Williams (died June 1, 1908) was an American politician from Ohio. He served as a member of the Ohio Senate from 1896 to 1899.

== Biography ==
Williams was a member of the Ohio Senate, representing the 21st district, from 1896 to 1899. In 1899, it was reported he was a potential candidate for lieutenant governor. In September 1899, Williams was elected as chairman of the delegates for the Methodist Episcopal Church conference.

In February 1900, Williams announced his candidacy for U.S. Congress against incumbent Robert Walker Tayler. He withdrew his candidacy in March. In January 1906, Williams announced his candidacy for U.S. Congress against incumbent James Kennedy. He withdrew his candidacy in March.

At the time of his death, Williams was a trustee at Mount Union College. Williams died on June 1, 1908, in Alliance, Ohio.
