= Samuel Furman Hunt =

American politician (1844–1907)

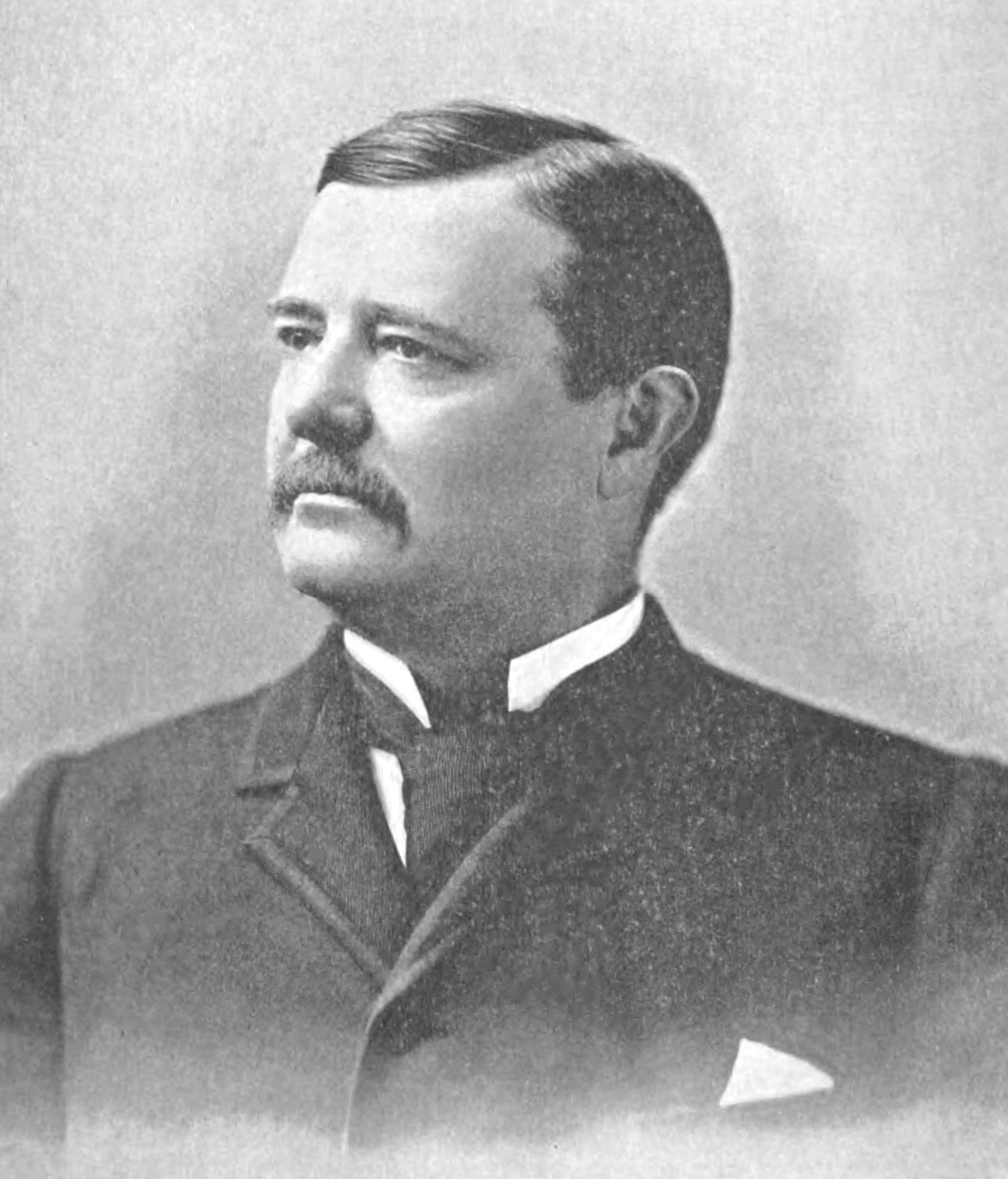

President Pro-Tempore of the Ohio Senate
- In office January 3, 1870 – December 31, 1871
- Preceded by: Thomas J. Godfrey
- Succeeded by: Allen T. Brinsmade

Personal details
- Born: October 24, 1844 Springdale, Ohio, U.S.
- Died: January 12, 1907 (aged 62) Glendale, Ohio, U.S.
- Resting place: Old St. Mary's Cemetery, Springdale, Ohio
- Party: Democratic
- Education: Miami University; Union College; Cincinnati Law School
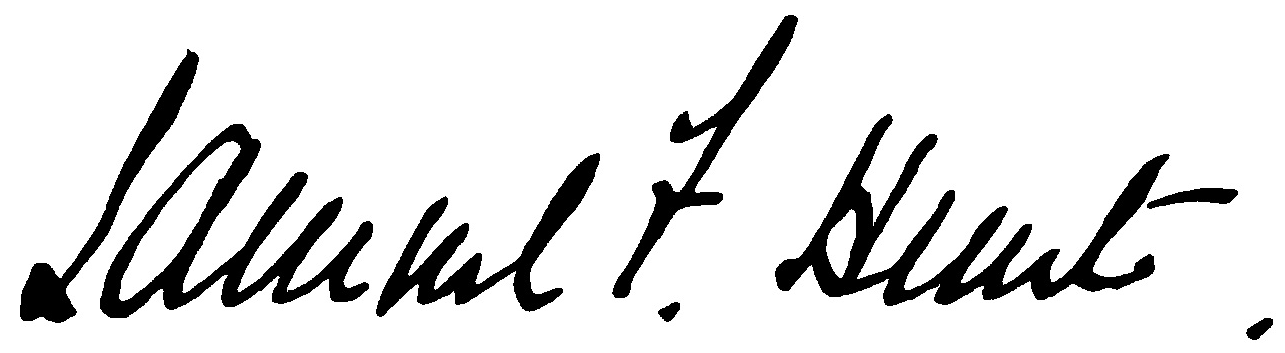
- Signature

Samuel Furman Hunt (October 24, 1844 – January 12, 1907) was an American politician. He was a legislative leader in the Ohio Senate, Judge Advocate General of his state, and a judge of the Superior Court of Cincinnati. Near the end of the American Civil War, he lowered the Confederate flag over the Confederate capitol in Richmond, Virginia after Confederate troops abandoned the city.

== Youth and Civil War ==
Samuel Furman Hunt was born at Springdale, Ohio, on October 24, 1844. He was the son of Dr. John Randolph Hunt (1795–1863), and Amanda Baird Hunt (1811–1892). He entered Miami University in 1860, where he was four years class president. He completed his college education at Union College, where he received bachelor's and master's degrees. He also received a bachelor's degree from Miami in the class of 1864.

During the American Civil War, Hunt visited the battlefield at Shiloh in 1862 to minister to the wounded and dying, and received the commendations of officers, soldiers and the Sanitary Commission. In March 1865, he was with the Army of the James. He entered the capital in advance of General Godfrey Weitzel's command, as he was in charge of supplies for sufferers in that city. He was the man who lowered the Confederate flag from the capitol building in Richmond, Virginia on the day that the Confederate forces abandoned that city.

The date was April 3, 1865. I saw the Union troops riding up Franklin street and riding at the side of the street somewhat in front of the advance guard, was a slightly built youth, whom I afterward knew as Judge Samuel F. Hunt. The Union army advanced to Capitol Square, which was filled with smoke from the fire made by the destruction of the Confederate documents of state. Hunt was apparently the first to see the Confederate flag at full mast. He dismounted hurriedly, dashed up the steps and seizing the ropes, pulled down the Confederate colors. His action was supplemented by another Union man, who was on hand with the stars and stripes and a few minutes later the flag of the country was flying where the flag of the South had been displayed a few minutes before.

— L.P. Ezekiel

During the war, Hunt also acted as a correspondent for one or more Cincinnati newspapers. After completing college, he studied law under Stanley Matthews, and at the Cincinnati Law School, where he received an LL.B. in 1867. He started working in the office of Henry Stanbery in 1868, shortly after Stanbery had resigned as United States Attorney General to take up the defense of President Andrew Johnson in his impeachment proceedings.

== Political career ==
In October 1869, Hunt was elected to the Ohio Senate, and he served 1870 and 1871. He was elected President Pro-Tempore of the Ohio Senate, being the youngest person in that position up to that point. He introduced the legislation to establish the University of Cincinnati, where he was a director 1872–1890 and chairman of the board for eleven of those years.

In 1871, Hunt was the Democratic nominee for Lieutenant Governor of Ohio. He lost to Republican Jacob Mueller. In 1873 he was a delegate to the constitutional convention that wrote a new constitution for the state. In 1878, Governor Richard M. Bishop appointed him Judge Advocate General of Ohio, with rank of Brigadier General.

In 1880, Hunt was the nominee for Ohio's 1st congressional district, losing to Benjamin Butterworth. In 1882, he moved from Springdale to Glendale. In January 1890, Governor James E. Campbell appointed him to the seat on the Superior Court of Cincinnati vacated when William Howard Taft was made United States Solicitor General. He was elected for the remaining three years of Taft's term in April that year, and to a full five-year term in 1893. He served 1890 to 1898. Ill health led him to refrain from running for another term.

== Professional and fraternal ==
In 1892, Hunt was elected president of the Ohio State Bar Association, and he was vice-president of the American Bar Association in 1893. In 1874 he was made a trustee of Miami University, and he was re-appointed several times, serving until his death. He was president of the Society of Alumni of Miami University 1887 and 1888. He was a member of the Ohio commandery of the Military Order of the Loyal Legion of the United States, the Sons of the American Revolution, Governor of the Society of the Colonial Wars in the State of Ohio, member of the Ohio Archaeological and Historical Society, Delta Kappa Epsilon fraternity, and honorary member of the Society of the Sailors and Soldiers of the Mexican War.

Hunt died unmarried on January 12, 1907, and he was buried at the church graveyard in Springdale, Ohio.

== See also ==
- Johnston de Peyster, who raised the first Union flag in the Confederate capital.

== Notes ==
Ohio Senate
Preceded by T.R. Briggs; H. Kessler; J. F. Torrence	Senator from 1st District; 1870-1871; Served alongside: Michael Goepper; Nathan Lord, Jr. Thomas H. Yeatman	Succeeded by John Schiff; Joseph F. Wright; Thomas L. Young
Legal offices
Preceded by Henderson Elliott	President of the Ohio State Bar Association; 1891	Succeeded by John H. Doyle
Preceded by William Howard Taft	Judge of the Superior Court of Cincinnati; 1890-1898	Succeeded by Edward J. Dempsey
Party political offices
Preceded by Thomas J. Godfrey	Democratic Party nominee for Lieutenant Governor of Ohio; 1871	Succeeded by Barnabas Burns
