= Anthony O. Calabrese Jr. =

American politician

Anthony Orlando Calabrese Jr. of Cleveland, Ohio, United States, is an Ohio state court judge of the Republican Party.

Calabrese attended Benedictine High School in Cleveland and earned a bachelor's degree from John Carroll University. In 1961, he was awarded a law degree by Cleveland State University College of Law.

Calabrese, the son of Democratic Ohio state Sen. Anthony O. Calabrese, practiced private law before serving as a member of the Cleveland-Cuyahoga County Port Authority for 10 years.

Calabrese was then elected to a seat in the Ohio House of Representatives, where he served for three terms, from 1960 to 1966.

From 1991 to 2003, Calabrese served as a judge of the Cuyahoga County, Ohio, Court of Common Pleas.

In 2002, Calabrese was elected to the bench of the Ohio Court of Appeals, Eighth Appellate District, and began serving there in February 2003.
