= 1851 Ohio lieutenant gubernatorial election =

- October 14, 1851
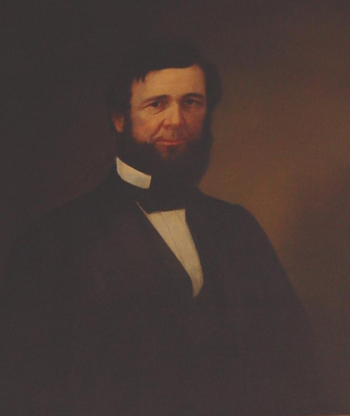

| Nominee | William Medill | Ephraim R. Eckley | Nicholas Spindler |
| Party | Democratic | Whig | Free Soil |
| Popular vote | 146,053 | 119,984 | 15,839 |
| Percentage | 51.81% | 42.57% | 5.62% |
Lieutenant Governor before election
Office established
Elected Lieutenant Governor
William Medill
Democratic

The 1851 Ohio lieutenant gubernatorial election was held on October 14, 1851, to elect the first Lieutenant Governor of Ohio. Democratic former Commissioner of Indian Affairs William Medill won the election, defeating Whig Ohio state senator Ephraim R. Eckley by nine percentage points with Free Soil candidate Nicholas Spindler finishing a distant third with five percent of the vote.

== General election ==
=== Candidates ===
- William Medill, Commissioner of Indian Affairs (1845–1849), U.S. Representative from Ohio's 9th congressional district (1839–1843), Speaker of the Ohio House of Representatives (1836–1837), Ohio state representative (1835–1838) (Democratic)
- Ephraim R. Eckley, Ohio state senator (1843–1847), (1849–1852) (Whig)
- Nicholas Spindler (Free Soil)

=== Results ===
1851 Ohio lieutenant gubernatorial election results
| Party | Candidate | Votes | % |
|---|---|---|---|
| Democratic | William Medill | 146,053 | 51.81% |
| Whig | Ephraim R. Eckley | 119,984 | 42.57% |
| Free Soil | Nicholas Spindler | 15,839 | 5.62% |
| Total votes | | 281,876 | 100.00% |
| Democratic hold | | | |
