= Thomas J. Godfrey =

American politician

Thomas Jefferson Godfrey
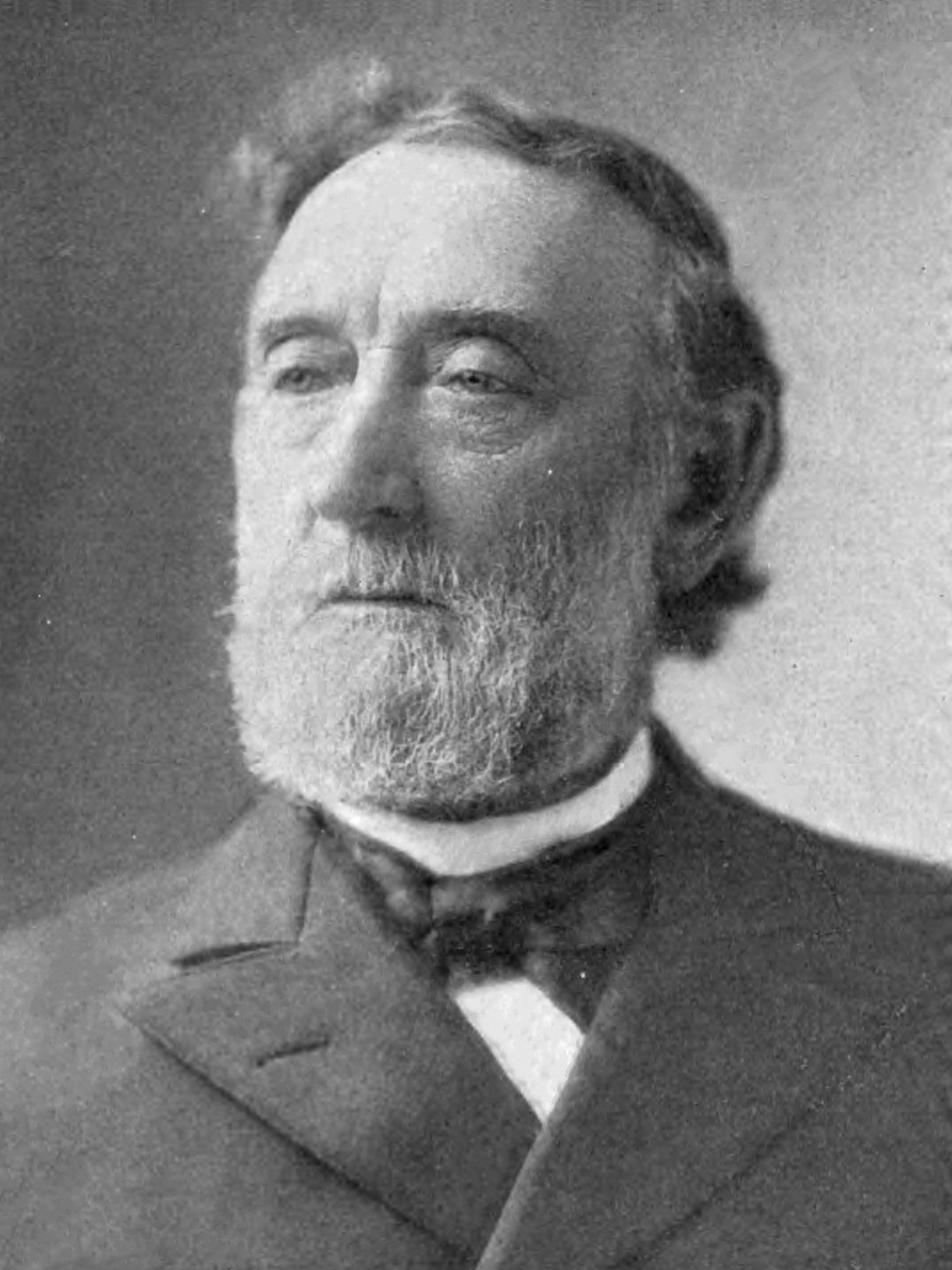

Member of the Ohio Senate from the 32 district
- In office January 1, 1866 – January 2, 1870 Serving with M. R. Willett (1866-67); William Carter (1868-69)
- Preceded by: Charles C. Marshall
- Succeeded by: Charles Boesel
- In office January 2, 1882 – January 3, 1886 Serving with Elmer White
- Preceded by: G. M. Saltzgaber
- Succeeded by: Robert Mehaffey; Levi Meredith; J. P. Schmeider

Personal details
- Born: June 6, 1831 Darke County, Ohio, US
- Died: November 30, 1906 (aged 75) Ohio, US
- Party: Democratic
- Spouse: Lorinda Milligan
- Children: Luella Godfrey Anderson
- Education: Asbury University; Cincinnati Law School
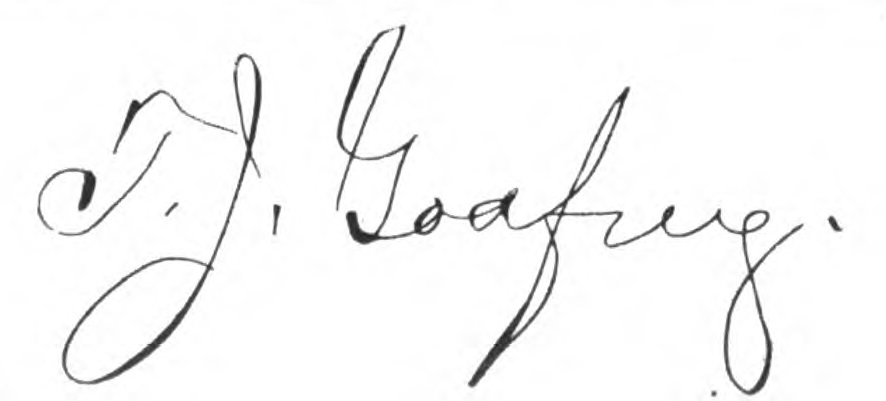
- Signature

Thomas Jefferson Godfrey (1831–1906) was a legislator in the U.S. State of Ohio. He was President Pro Tempore of the Ohio Senate 1868 to 1870.

== Early life ==
Godfrey was born June 6, 1831, in Darke County, Ohio, to Elias B. and Sarah (Elliott) Godfrey. He went to the common schools, and two seminaries. He went to Indiana Asbury University, located in Greencastle, Indiana, (now DePauw University), and began teaching school at various places in Indiana and Ohio.

Godfrey read law in the offices of Allen & Meeker in Greenville, Ohio, and graduated from Cincinnati Law School in 1857.

== Career ==
Godfrey was admitted to the bar, and began a practice in Celina, Ohio. He was elected prosecuting attorney of Mercer County in 1863, and was nominated for the Ohio Senate for the 32nd district, then Allen, Auglaize, Defiance, Mercer, Paulding, Van Wert and Williams counties in 1865. He was elected to the 57th Ohio General Assembly, and was re-elected two years later to the 58th, (1866-1870) He was elected President pro tem during the latter term.

In 1869, the Democrats nominated Godfrey for Lieutenant Governor of Ohio, but he lost to Jacob Mueller. In 1873, he was elected a delegate to the Ohio constitutional convention.

In 1880, Godfrey was a candidate for presidential elector for the 5th congressional district, but the state voted for Republican James A. Garfield. He was again elected to the State Senate in 1881 and 1883, and served in the 65th and 66th General Assemblies, (1882-1886).

He was president of the local Building & Loan in 1870, which became a bank called Milligan, Godfrey & Co., and later Godfrey & Milligan, and later still the Commercial Banking Co. He also had farming interests.

== Personal life ==
Godfrey married Lorinda Milligan and had one daughter named Luella, later Anderson.

He was a 32nd degree Scottish Rite Mason, Knight Templar, and Knight of Pythias. Beginning in May, 1878, Godfrey was a member of the Board of Trustees of Ohio State University. He was President of the Board for seven years.

He died November 30, 1906, in Ohio.

== Notes ==
Party political offices
Preceded by Daniel S. Uhl	Democratic Party nominee for Lieutenant Governor of Ohio; 1869	Succeeded by Samuel Furman Hunt
