= 80th Ohio Infantry Regiment =

- Active: October 1861 to August 15, 1865
- Country: United States
- Allegiance: Union
- Branch: Infantry
- Engagements: Siege of Corinth; Battle of Iuka; Battle of Port Gibson; Battle of Raymond; Battle of Jackson; Battle of Champion Hill; Siege of Vicksburg; Chattanooga campaign; Battle of Missionary Ridge; Sherman's March to the Sea; Carolinas campaign; Battle of Bentonville

The 80th Ohio Infantry Regiment, sometimes 80th Ohio Volunteer Infantry (or 80th OVI) was an infantry regiment in the Union Army during the American Civil War.

== Service ==
The 80th Ohio Infantry was organized at Canal Dover, Ohio from October 1861 through January 1862 and mustered in for three years service on January 11, 1862, under the command of Colonel Ephraim R. Eckley.

The regiment was attached to District of Paducah, Kentucky, to April 1862. 2nd Brigade, 3rd Division, Army of the Mississippi, to November 1862. 2nd Brigade, 7th Division, Left Wing, XIII Corps, Department of the Tennessee, to December 1862. 2nd Brigade, 7th Division, XVI Corps, Army of the Tennessee, to January 1863. 2nd Brigade, 7th Division, XVII Corps, to September 1863. 2nd Brigade, 2nd Division, XVII Corps, to December 1863. 2nd Brigade, 3rd Division, XV Corps, to April 1865. 1st Brigade, 2nd Division, XV Corps, to July 1865. Department of Arkansas to August 1865.

The 80th Ohio Infantry mustered out of service at Little Rock, Arkansas, on August 15, 1865.

=== Detailed service ===
The detailed service of the three-year 80th OVI is as follows:

==== 1862 ====
- Left State for Paducah, Ky., February 10, 1862.
- Duty at Paducah, Ky., February to April 1862.
- Moved to Hamburg Landing, Tenn., April 20.
- Advance on and siege of Corinth, Miss., April 29-May 30.
- Pursuit to Booneville May 31-June 12.
- Expedition to Ripley June 22–23, and duty at Ripley until September.
- Battle of Iuka, Miss., September 16.
- Battle of Corinth, Miss., October 3–4.
- Pursuit to Hatchie River October 5–12.
- Grant's Central Mississippi Campaign, operations on the Mississippi Central Railroad, November 2, 1862, to January 4, 1863.
- Reconnaissance from LaGrange November 8–9, 1862.
- Reconnaissance from Davis Mills to Coldwater November 12–13.

==== 1863 ====
- Guard trains to Memphis, Tenn., January 4–8, 1863.
- Duty at Forest Hill until February 16, and at Memphis until March 1.
- Moved to Helena, Ark., March 1.
- Yazoo Pass Expedition and operations against Fort Pemberton and Greenwood March 10-April 5.
- Moved to Milliken's Bend, La., April 13.
- Movement on Bruinsburg and turning Grand Gulf April 25–30.
- Battle of Port Gibson, Miss., May 1 (reserve).
- Battles of Raymond May 12;
- Jackson May 14;
- Champion Hill May 16.
- Escort prisoners to Memphis, Tenn., May 17-June 4.
- Siege of Vicksburg June 6-July 4.
- Moved to Helena, Ark., August 20.
- To Memphis, Tenn., September 20.
- March to Chattanooga, Tenn., October 10-November 22.
- Operations on the Memphis & Charleston Railroad in Alabama October 20–29.
- Chattanooga-Ringgold Campaign November 23–27.
- Tunnel Hill November 24–25.
- Missionary Ridge November 25.
- Pursuit to Graysville November 26–27.

==== 1864 ====
- Guard duty on the Memphis & Charleston Railroad until June 6, 1864.
- Duty at Allatoona June 7–25, and at Resaca until November 10.
- Repulse of attack on Resaca October 12–13.
- March to the sea November 15-December 10.
- Siege of Savannah December 10–21.

==== 1865 ====
- Campaign of the Carolinas January to April 1865.
- Fishburn's Plantation, near Lane's Bridge, Salkehatchie River, S.C., February 6.
- South Edisto River February 9.
- North Edisto River February 12–13.
- Columbia February 16–17.
- Cox's Bridge, N.C., March 19–20.
- Battle of Bentonville March 20–21.
- Occupation of Goldsboro March 24.
- Advance on Raleigh April 10–14.
- Occupation of Raleigh April 10.
- Bennett's House April 26.
- Surrender of Johnston and his army.
- March to Washington, D.C., via Richmond, Va., April 29-May 20.
- Grand Review of the Armies May 24.
- Moved to Louisville, Ky., June, then to Little Rock, Ark., and duty there until August.

== Casualties ==
The regiment lost a total of 224 men during service; 4 officers and 48 enlisted men killed or mortally wounded, 2 officers and 179 enlisted men died of disease.

== Commanders ==
- Colonel Ephraim R. Eckley
- Colonel Matthias H. Bartilson
- Lieutenant Colonel Pren Metham - commanded during the siege of Vicksburg as major and during the battle of Missionary Ridge
- Capt. Sylvester S. Wallace

Commander during Sherman's March to the Sea

== Notable members ==
- Sergeant Freeman Davis, Company B - Medal of Honor recipient for action at the battle of Missionary Ridge, November 25, 1863
- Colonel Ephraim R. Eckley - U.S. Representative from Ohio, 1863–1869

== See also ==
- List of Ohio Civil War units
- Ohio in the Civil War
