= Ozell Sutton =

American journalist

- Born: December 13, 1925; Gould, Arkansas, US
- Died: December 19, 2015 (aged 90); Atlanta, Georgia, US
- Education: Philander Smith College
- Honours: Congressional Gold Medal

Ozell Sutton (December 13, 1925 – December 19, 2015) was an American soldier and recipient of the Congressional Gold Medal. He was among the first Black members of the U.S. Marine Corps. He was named one of the 100 most influential Black Americans by Ebony magazine.

== Early life ==
Sutton was born on December 13, 1925 outside of the town of Gould in Lincoln County, Arkansas. His family moved to Little Rock, Arkansas and he graduated from Dunbar High School.

He was among the first Black members of the U.S. Marine Corps. Sutton received his undergraduate degree in 1950 from Philander Smith College.

== Career ==
Sutton worked at the Little Rock Democrat newspaper.

Sutton worked for Arkansas Governor Winthrop Rockefeller as the director of the Governor's Council on Human Resources. He was a founding member of the executive board of the National Center for Missing and Exploited Children. Sutton moved to Atlanta, Georgia where he worked for the United States Department of Justice Community Relations Service.

== Personal life ==
He marched with Martin Luther King Jr. in 1963 in the historic March on Washington D.C., and in 1965 in the Selma to Montgomery marches.

Sutton was the 26th General President of Alpha Phi Alpha fraternity. As president, he was named one of the 100 most influential Black Americans by Ebony magazine.

He died in Atlanta on December 19, 2015, at the age of 90.

== Honors ==
In 1962, he received an honorary doctorate from Philander Smith in recognition of his political activism in the civil rights movement.

In 2012, he was presented with the Congressional Gold Medal from President Barack Obama for being among the first Black members of the U.S. Marine Corps.

| Preceded by James R. Williams | General President of Alpha Phi Alpha; 1981-1984 | Succeeded by Charles Teamer |
