= Harvey J. Eckley =

American politician and judge (1845–1922)

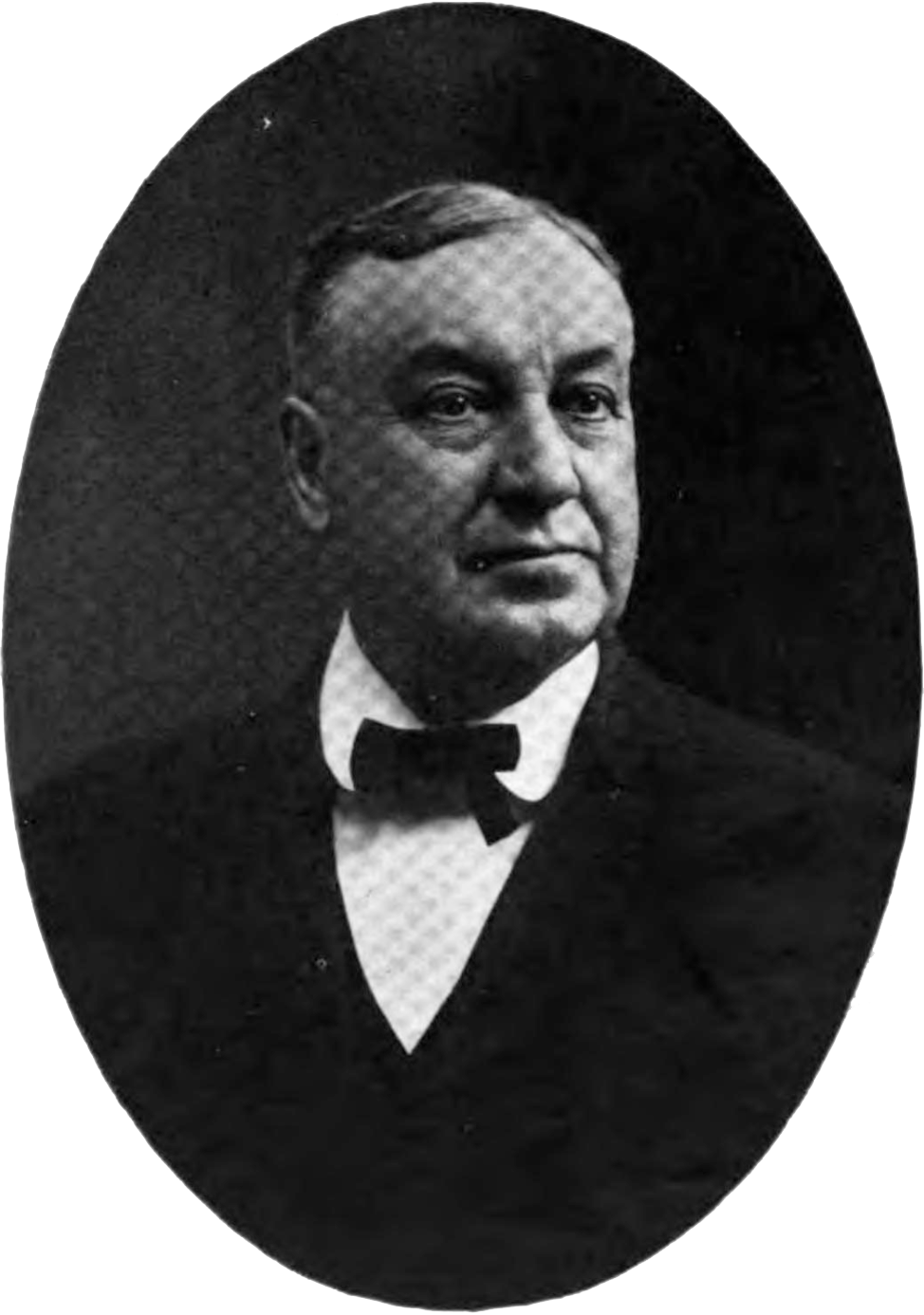
- Eckley in 1921 publication

Member of the Ohio Senate from the 21st district
- In office 1892–1895
- Preceded by: Anthony Howells
- Succeeded by: Silas J. Williams

Personal details
- Born: October 29, 1845 Carrollton, Ohio, U.S.
- Died: January 2, 1922 (aged 76) Carrollton, Ohio, U.S.
- Party: Republican
- Spouse: Anna M. McCoy (m. 1879)
- Children: 2
- Parent: Ephraim R. Eckley (father)
- Education: Washington and Jefferson College (AB)
- Occupation: Politician; lawyer; judge

Harvey J. Eckley (October 29, 1845 – January 2, 1922) was an American politician and judge from Ohio. He served as a member of the Ohio Senate from 1892 to 1895.

== Early life ==
Harvey J. Eckley was born on October 29, 1845, in Carrollton, Ohio, to Martha L. (née Brown) and Ephraim R. Eckley. He attended public schools in Carrollton. He graduated from Washington and Jefferson College with a Bachelor of Arts in 1868. He was a member of Beta Theta Pi. He read law in his father's office and then was admitted to the bar in 1872.

== Career ==
Eckley practiced law in Carrollton. He served as prosecuting attorney of Carroll County from 1877 to 1880.

Eckley was a Republican. He served as a member of the Ohio Senate, representing the 21st district, from 1892 to 1895. He was appointed judge of the Common Pleas Court in 1915, and was elected to that role in 1916. He held the judgeship until his death and was succeeded by Fred W. McCoy.

Eckley was a member of the board of trustees of the State Hospital in Massillon. He was associate editor of the Carroll Free Press with John H. Tripp. He was director of the Cummings Trust Company.

== Personal life ==
Eckley married Anna M. McCoy, daughter of Judge William McCoy of Carrollton, on July 10, 1879. They had two children, Gretchen and Frederick R. He lived in Carrollton.

Eckley died on January 2, 1922, at his home in Carrollton.
