= Ephraim R. Eckley =

American politician (1811–1908)

Ephraim Ralph Eckley
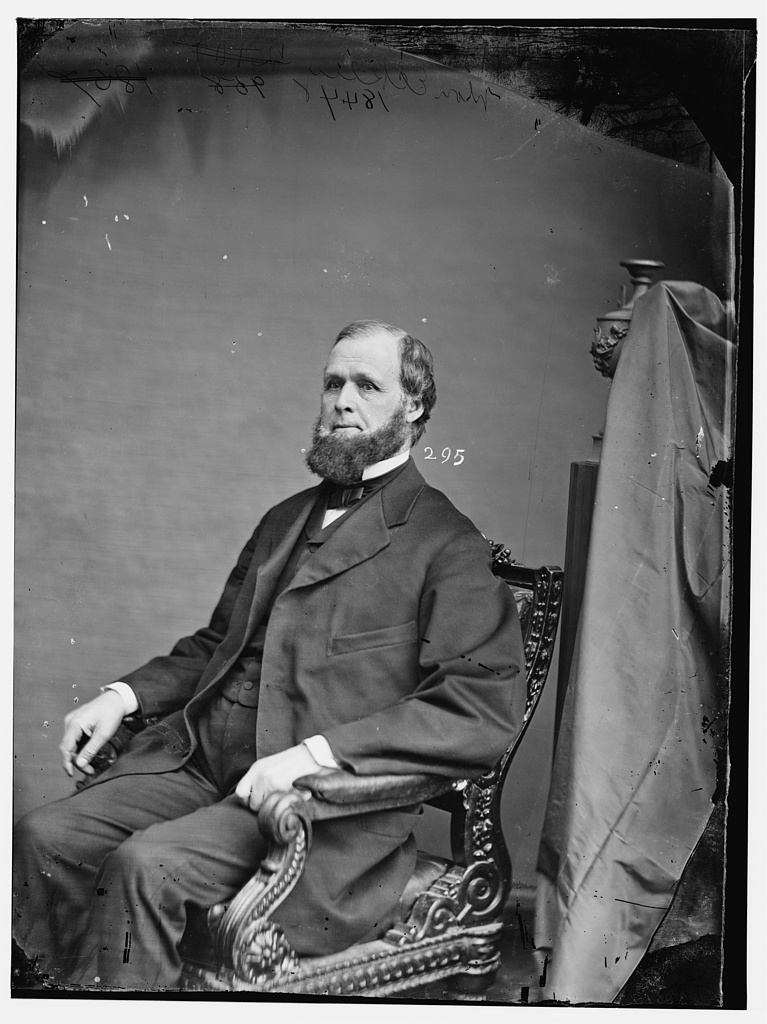

Member of the U.S. House of Representatives from Ohio's 17th district
- In office March 4, 1863 – March 3, 1869
- Preceded by: James R. Morris
- Succeeded by: Jacob A. Ambler

Member of the Ohio Senate from the Jefferson & Carroll counties district
- In office December 4, 1843 – December 5, 1847
- Preceded by: James Mitchell
- Succeeded by: Alden J. Bennett

Member of the Ohio Senate from the Tuscarawas & Carroll counties district
- In office December 3, 1849 – January 4, 1852
- Preceded by: Alden J. Bennett
- Succeeded by: district eliminated

Member of the Ohio House of Representatives from the Carroll County district
- In office January 2, 1854 – January 6, 1856
- Preceded by: Robert George
- Succeeded by: Silas Potts

Personal details
- Born: December 9, 1811 Mount Pleasant, Ohio, U.S.
- Died: March 27, 1908 (aged 96) Carrollton, Ohio, U.S.
- Resting place: Grand View Cemetery; Carrollton, Ohio, U.S. 40°34′09″N 81°04′55″W
- Party: Republican; Whig
- Spouse: Martha L. Brown
- Children: 5, including Harvey J.
- Education: Vermillion Institute
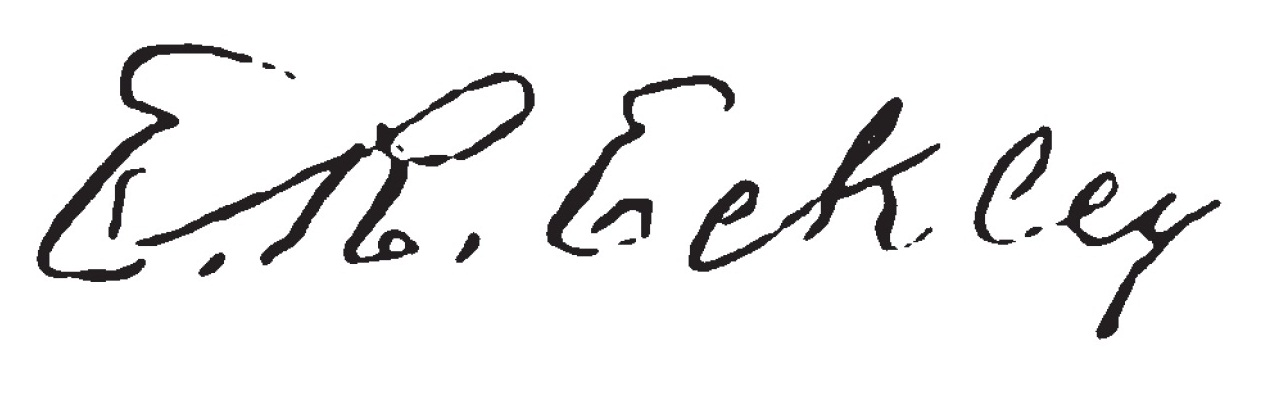
- Signature

Military service
- Allegiance: United States
- Branch/service: Union Army
- Years of service: 1861-1863
- Rank: Colonel
- Unit: 26th Ohio Infantry; 80th Ohio Infantry

Ephraim Ralph Eckley (December 9, 1811 – March 27, 1908) was an American Civil War veteran and three-term U.S. Representative from Ohio, serving from 1863 to 1869.

== Early life ==
Eckley was born near Mount Pleasant, Jefferson County, Ohio, but moved with his parents to Hayesville, Ohio, in 1816.

He attended the common schools and was graduated from Vermillion Institute, Hayesville, Ohio. He moved to Carrollton, Ohio, in 1833 and taught school.

He studied law under William Johnston and was admitted to the bar in 1836; he commenced practice in Carrollton.

He served as member of the State senate 1843-1846, 1849, and 1850 but was an unsuccessful candidate for Lieutenant Governor of Ohio in 1851. He also served in the State house of representatives 1853-1855 but was an unsuccessful candidate for election in 1853 to the United States Senate.

He served as delegate to the first Republican National Convention at Philadelphia in 1856.

== Civil War ==
During the Civil War, Eckley served in the Union Army as the colonel of the 26th Ohio Infantry, and later of the 80th Ohio Infantry.

== Postbellum ==
Eckley was elected as a Republican to the Thirty-eighth, Thirty-ninth, and Fortieth Congresses (March 4, 1863 – March 3, 1869) but was not a candidate for renomination in 1868. He resumed the practice of law in Carrollton, Ohio.

Although he had not been brevetted brigadier general during the war, after command of a brigade near Corinth, after which he was again given command of a brigade in the Army of the Mississippi and followed Beauregard to Booneville, Mississippi, he was referred to as "The General" in the postbellum years.

From 1872 until 1878, Eckley also directed the expansion and improvement of the Ohio & Toledo Rail Road, a narrow-gauge predecessor to the Wheeling and Lake Erie Railway (1916–1988).

He died March 27, 1908, in Carrollton, Ohio, and was interred in Grand View Cemetery.

He married Martha L. Brown and had five children, including Harvey J. His son Harvey was an Ohio state senator and judge.

== See also ==
- Ohio lieutenant gubernatorial elections

U.S. House of Representatives
Preceded by James R. Morris	Member of the U.S. House of Representatives from Ohio's 17th congressional district March 4, 1863 - March 3, 1869	Succeeded by Jacob A. Ambler
