= 1966 Ohio lieutenant gubernatorial election =

- November 8, 1966
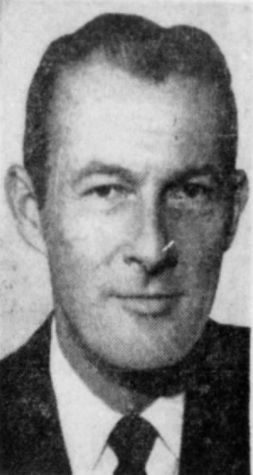

Nominee	John William Brown	William L. Coleman
Party	Republican	Democratic
Popular vote	1,647,677	1,085,033
Percentage	60.29%	39.71%
- County results Brown: 50–60% 60–70% 70–80% Coleman: 50–60%
Lieutenant Governor before election
John William Brown
Republican
Elected Lieutenant Governor
John William Brown
Republican

The 1966 Ohio lieutenant gubernatorial election was held on November 8, 1966, to elect the Lieutenant Governor of Ohio. Republican incumbent Lieutenant Governor John William Brown defeated his Democratic opponent William L. Coleman in a landslide, winning 60.29% of the vote.

== Republican primary ==
=== Candidates ===
- John William Brown, incumbent Lieutenant Governor of Ohio (1963–1975), (1953–1957)

=== Campaign ===
The Republican primary was held on May 3, 1966. Brown won renomination without opposition.

=== Results ===
Republican primary results
Party	Candidate	Votes	%
Republican	John William Brown	565,632	100%
Total votes		565,632	100.0%

== Democratic primary ==
=== Candidates ===
- William L. Coleman, Union County Prosecutor
- Paul J. Lynch

=== Campaign ===
The Democratic primary was held on May 3, 1966. Coleman defeated Lynch by seven percentage points.

=== Results ===
Democratic primary results
Party	Candidate	Votes	%
Democratic	William L. Coleman	263,508	53.65%
Democratic	Paul J. Lynch	227,692	46.35%
Total votes		491,200	100.0%

== General election ==
=== Candidates ===
- John William Brown, incumbent Lieutenant Governor of Ohio (1963–1975), (1953–1957) (Republican)
- William L. Coleman, Union County Prosecutor (Democratic)

=== Results ===
1966 Ohio lieutenant gubernatorial election results
Party	Candidate	Votes	%	±%
Republican	John William Brown	1,647,677	60.29%	+4.73%
Democratic	William L. Coleman	1,085,033	39.71%	−4.73%
Total votes		2,732,710	100.0%	
Republican hold				
