= 1903 Ohio lieutenant gubernatorial election =

- November 2, 1903
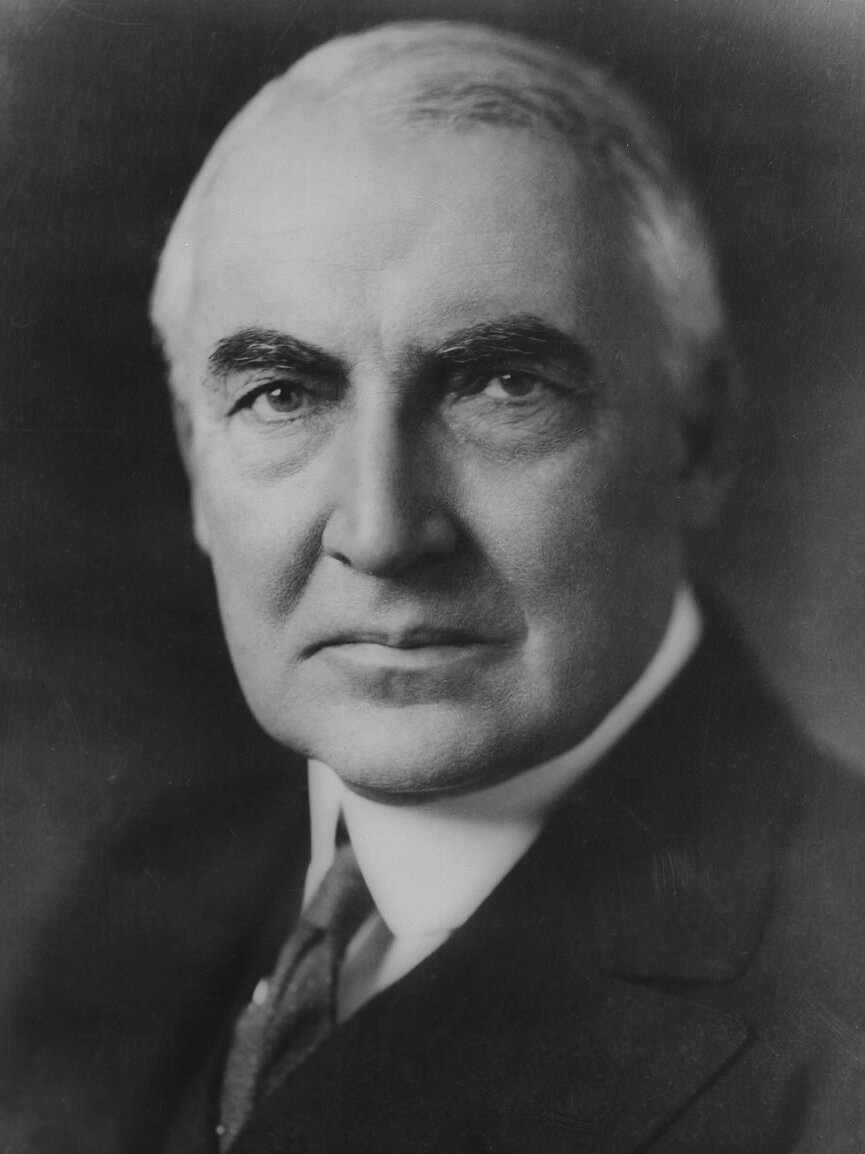

| Nominee | Warren G. Harding | Frank B. Niles |
| Party | Republican | Democratic |
| Popular vote | 474,311 | 357,573 |
| Percentage | 55.05% | 41.50% |
Lieutenant Governor before election
Harry L. Gordon
Republican
Elected Lieutenant Governor
Warren G. Harding
Republican

The 1903 Ohio lieutenant gubernatorial election was held on November 2, 1903, to elect the lieutenant governor of Ohio. Incumbent Republican Harry L. Gordon was not a candidate for re-election. Republican Ohio State Senator and future president Warren G. Harding won the election, defeating Democratic Ohio State Representative Frank B. Niles by thirteen percentage points.

== General election ==
=== Candidates ===
- David F. Cronin (Socialist Labor)
- Warren G. Harding, Ohio state senator (1900–1904) (Republican)
- Michael J. Hynes (Socialist)
- Frank B. Niles, Ohio state representative (Democratic)
- Joseph M. Scott (Prohibition)

=== Results ===
1903 Ohio lieutenant gubernatorial election results
| Party | Candidate | Votes | % |
|---|---|---|---|
| Republican | Warren G. Harding | 474,311 | 55.05% |
| Democratic | Frank B. Niles | 357,573 | 41.50% |
| Socialist | Michael J. Hynes | 14,054 | 1.63% |
| Prohibition | Joseph M. Scott | 13,491 | 1.57% |
| Socialist Labor | David F. Cronin | 2,176 | 0.25% |
| Total votes | | 861,605 | 100.00% |
| Republican hold | | | |
