= John William Brown =

U.S. Politician from Ohio

John W. Brown
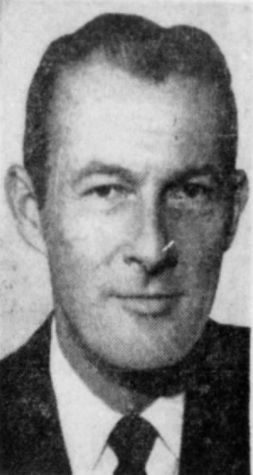
- Akron Beacon Journal, November 2, 1957

58th Governor of Ohio
- In office January 3, 1957 – January 14, 1957
- Lieutenant: Vacant
- Preceded by: Frank J. Lausche
- Succeeded by: C. William O'Neill

51st & 54th Lieutenant Governor of Ohio
- In office January 14, 1963 – January 13, 1975
- Governor: Jim Rhodes; John J. Gilligan
- Preceded by: John W. Donahey
- Succeeded by: Dick Celeste
- In office January 12, 1953 – January 3, 1957
- Governor: Frank J. Lausche
- Preceded by: George D. Nye
- Succeeded by: Paul M. Herbert

4th Chair of the National Lieutenant Governors Association
- In office 1965–1966
- Preceded by: Robert Evander McNair
- Succeeded by: Harry Lee Waterfield

Mayor of Medina
- In office 1950–1953

Member of the Ohio Senate
- In office 1961–1963

Member of the Ohio House of Representatives from the 69th district
- In office 1959–1961

Personal details
- Born: December 28, 1913 Athens, Ohio, U.S.
- Died: October 29, 1993 (aged 79) Medina, Ohio, U.S.
- Party: Republican

John William Brown (December 28, 1913 – October 29, 1993) was an American Republican politician from Ohio. He briefly served as the 58th governor of Ohio from January 3, 1957, to January 14, 1957, and served as the 51st and 54th lieutenant governor of Ohio.

Brown also served as mayor of Medina, in the Ohio House, and in the Ohio Senate.

== Lieutenant governor ==
John W. Brown is Ohio's longest serving lieutenant governor, having served under three different governors from 1953 to 1957 and 1963 to 1975. In 1952, he unseated the incumbent lieutenant governor, Democrat George D. Nye, and took office in 1953. (At the time, the office of lieutenant governor was elected separately from the office of governor). Brown defeated Nye again in 1954 to win a second two-year term.

In 1956, instead of seeking another term as lieutenant governor, Brown ran for the gubernatorial nomination against state Attorney General C. William O'Neill. Brown lost badly in the primary, getting only 27.5% of the vote to O'Neill's 72.5%.

== Governor of Ohio ==
In January 1957, as Brown was about to leave the lieutenant governorship, Frank J. Lausche, the Democratic governor of Ohio, resigned to take a seat in the United States Senate, which he had won in the 1956 general election. Brown, thus, was elevated to the office of governor. Lausche's successor, C. William O'Neill (who had defeated Brown in the gubernatorial primary), had already been elected, at the same time that Lausche won his Senate seat; however, at the time, the U.S. Senate term began on January 3, but the Ohio gubernatorial term did not end until January 14.

Into the breach stepped the outgoing lieutenant governor. Brown took his eleven-day-long governorship very seriously. He moved into the governor's mansion, summoned the General Assembly to hear his state of the state address, demanded and received the governor's salary for the eleven days, and deposited five boxes of gubernatorial papers with the Ohio Historical Society. Among papers was a letter, on gubernatorial letter-head, to Columbus mayor M. E. Sensenbrenner, asking him to take care of a parking ticket. There was also a letter to then-President Eisenhower asking for a federal job after his eleven days in the governor's office were complete.

== Later career ==
John William Brown speaking in 1979

In 1958, Brown was elected to the Ohio House of Representatives, where he served from 1959 to 1961. He won the election to the lieutenant governorship again in 1962, and served another three terms (by this time, the lieutenant governor's term had been extended to four years), from 1963 to 1975. In 1974, Brown lost his bid for another term to Richard F. Celeste.

After serving as lieutenant governor, Brown worked to reactivate, and became the first commandant of, the Ohio Naval Militia.

== Legacy ==
Brown Arena at the Ohio Expo Center and State Fair in Columbus, Ohio, is named in honor of Brown.

== Notes ==
Party political offices
Preceded by J. Eugene Roberts	Republican nominee for Lieutenant Governor of Ohio; 1952, 1954	Succeeded by Paul M. Herbert
Preceded by Paul M. Herbert	Republican nominee for Lieutenant Governor of Ohio; 1962, 1966, 1970, 1974	Succeeded by George Voinovich
Political offices
Preceded by George D. Nye	Lieutenant Governor of Ohio; 1953–1957	Succeeded by Paul M. Herbert
Preceded by Frank J. Lausche	Governor of Ohio; 1957	Succeeded by C. William O'Neill
Preceded by John W. Donahey	Lieutenant Governor of Ohio; 1963–1975	Succeeded by Richard F. Celeste
