= George D. Nye =

American politician (1898–1969)

48th & 50th Lieutenant Governor of Ohio
- In office January 8, 1945 – January 13, 1947; January 10, 1949 – January 12, 1953
- Preceded by: Paul M. Herbert (first term); Paul M. Herbert (second term)
- Succeeded by: Paul M. Herbert (first term); John William Brown (second term)

Personal details
- Born: George Dewey Nye; August 6, 1898 Waverly, Ohio, U.S.
- Died: January 27, 1969 (aged 70) Boston, Massachusetts, U.S.
- Resting place: Evergreen Union Cemetery, Waverly, Ohio, U.S.
- Party: Democratic
- Spouse: Leota Baker (1941–1969; his death)
- Relations: Dr. George B. Nye (father)

George Dewey Nye (August 6, 1898 – January 27, 1969), born in Waverly, Ohio, was an American politician of the Democratic party.

During World War I, Nye served in the United States Navy. In 1928, Nye ran for a seat in the United States House of Representatives, losing to incumbent Republican Charles C. Kearns. In 1929, he was elected to a common pleas court judgeship, in which he served from 1930 to 1937. In 1938, Nye was a member of the Ohio Democratic State Central Committee. In 1940, he served as an alternate delegate to the Democratic National Convention.

In 1942 and the six succeeding elections, Nye was nominated by the Democratic party for the office of lieutenant governor of Ohio. He won three two-year terms to the office in two separate tenures, serving as the 48th and 50th lieutenant governor, from 1945 to 1947 and from 1949 to 1953.

Nye died of complications of hip surgery in 1969 at Massachusetts General Hospital. He was 70.

== See also ==
- List of Ohio lieutenant gubernatorial elections
- Ohio's 6th congressional district

Party political offices
Preceded by	Democratic nominee for Attorney General of Ohio; 1940	Succeeded by Herbert S. Duffy
Preceded by Robert S. Cox	Democratic nominee for Lieutenant Governor of Ohio; 1942, 1944, 1946, 1948, 1950, 1952, 1954	Succeeded by John Taylor
Political offices
Preceded by Paul M. Herbert	Lieutenant Governor of Ohio; 1945–1947	Succeeded by Paul M. Herbert
Preceded by Paul M. Herbert	Lieutenant Governor of Ohio; 1949–1953	Succeeded by John W. Brown
