= William R. Van Aken =

American politician and lawyer (1912–1993)

Member of the Ohio House of Representatives
- In office 1947–1948
- In office 1943–1944

Personal details
- Born: William Russell Van Aken; December 1, 1912
- Died: September 28, 1993 (aged 80)
- Resting place: Lake View Cemetery, Cleveland, Ohio, U.S.
- Education: Lafayette College; Case Western Reserve University
- Occupation: Politician, lawyer

William Russell Van Aken (December 1, 1912 – September 28, 1993) was a member of the Ohio House of Representatives from 1943 through 1944 and from 1947 through 1948. He was on the Shaker Heights City Council from 1951 to 1955 serving as Mayor. A lawyer, he was president of the Ohio Bar Association (1958–1959).
