= Grace L. Drake =

American politician (1926–2020)

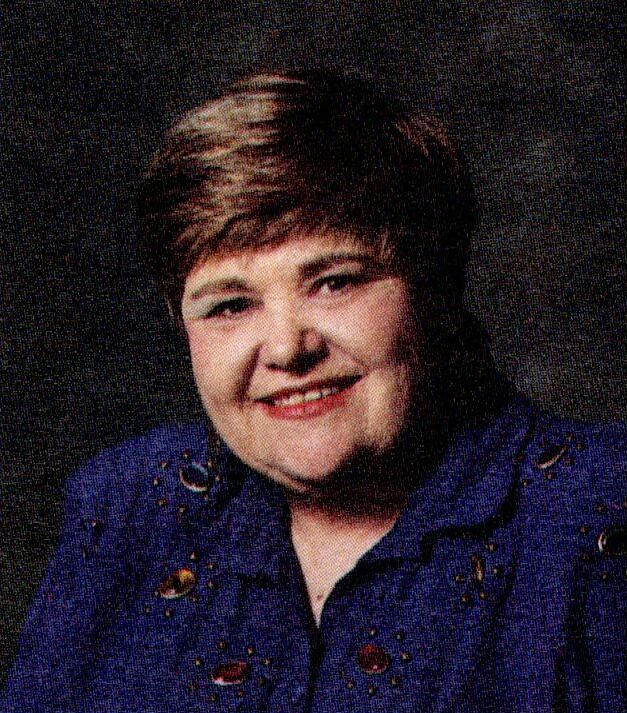

Member of the Ohio Senate from the 22nd district
- In office May 20, 1984 – December 31, 2000
- Preceded by: Ben Skall
- Succeeded by: Ron Amstutz

Personal details
- Born: May 25, 1926 New London, Connecticut, U.S.
- Died: December 30, 2020 (aged 94) Solon, Ohio, U.S.
- Party: Republican

Grace L. Drake (née Driscoll; May 25, 1926 – December 30, 2020) was an American politician, member of the Ohio Senate, serving the 22nd district from 1984 to 2000. Her district encompassed the eastern/southern portion of Cuyahoga County and all of Medina and Wayne Counties. In 2000 she faced term limits and was succeeded by Ron Amstutz.

== Biography ==
Grace L. Drake was born, on May 25, 1926, in New London, Connecticut and graduated from Williams Memorial Institute, in New London, in 1944. She later moved to Solon, Ohio and was a photographer and a studio manager. During her tenure in the Senate she advocated for the Ohio State University-Agricultural Technical Institute in Wooster, and the Ohio Agricultural Research and Development Center, establishing legislation that transferred ownership of the surrounding land to the Institute for use as a working farm. In 2003 her work was recognized when the university renamed the area the Grace L. Drake Agricultural Laboratory.

In 2001 Drake founded the Ohio Center for the Advancement of Women in Public Service at the Maxine Goodman Levin College of Urban Affairs at Cleveland State University. The center aims to inspire women to choose public sector careers. Drake died on December 30, 2020, in Solon, Ohio.
