= College Now Greater Cleveland =

College Now Greater Cleveland, formerly known as Cleveland Scholarship Programs, was established in 1967 by Robert Coplan, one of the founders of the Benesch, Friedlander, Coplan, and Aronoff law firm. Its primary goal was providing scholarships to students in the Cleveland Metropolitan School District. Since then, it has grown into one of the nation's leading college access program, supporting more than 20,000 students each year.

College Now provides college access services to Cuyahoga County residents interested in enrolling in four-year universities, community colleges and vocational and technical programs. It also serves students from kindergarten through high school in Cuyahoga and Lorain counties, and adult learners who want to return to college in 11 Northeast Ohio Counties: Ashtabula, Cuyahoga, Geauga, Lake, Lorain, Mahoning, Medina, Portage, Stark, Summit, and Trumbull. College Now offers scholarships as well as mentoring, advising and planning resources. Over its history, the organization has helped more than 200,000 students go through the college and financial aid application process.
