= Freeman Davis (soldier) =

American Civil War soldier

- Born: February 28, 1842; Newcomerstown, Ohio
- Died: February 23, 1899 (aged 56); Butler, Missouri
- Burial place: Oak Hill Cemetery
- Military career
- Allegiance: United States of America
- Branch: United States Army
- Rank: Sergeant
- Unit: 80th Ohio Volunteer Infantry Regiment - Company B
- Conflicts: Battle of Missionary Ridge
- Awards: Medal of Honor

Freeman Davis (February 28, 1842 – February 23, 1899) was an American soldier who fought in the American Civil War. Davis received the United States' highest award for bravery during combat, the Medal of Honor, for his action during the Battle of Missionary Ridge in Tennessee on 25 November 1863. He was honored with the award on 30 March 1898.

== Biography ==
Davis was born in Newcomerstown, Ohio on February 28, 1842. Son of Charles Davis and Hannah Miller. He enlisted into the 80th Ohio Infantry. He died on February 23, 1899, and his remains are interred at the Oak Hill Cemetery in Missouri.

== Medal of Honor citation ==
This soldier, while his regiment was falling back, saw the 2 color bearers shot down, under severe fire, and at imminent peril recovered both the flags and saved them from capture.

== See also ==
- List of American Civil War Medal of Honor recipients: A–F
