= Walter Washington (educator) =

African American educator (1923–1999)

- Born: July 13, 1923; Hazlehurst, Mississippi
- Died: December 1, 1999 (aged 76)
- Education: Tougaloo College; Indiana University; Yale University; Harvard University; University of Southern Mississippi
- Occupation: Educator

Dr. Walter Washington (July 13, 1923 – December 1, 1999) was an American educator. He was born in Hazlehurst, Mississippi. In 1949, Washington married his college sweetheart, the former Carolyn Carter, who is a retired college professor. A daughter, Wendy Carol, was born in 1963 but died shortly after birth.

== Educational and professional achievements ==
Washington received the Bachelor of Arts degree from Tougaloo College; the Master of Science degree from Indiana University; the Education Specialist from Peabody College; a certificate in Alcoholic Studies from Yale University; the doctorate from the University of Southern Mississippi; and attended Harvard University's Institute for Educational Management in 1988. He also received the following honorary degrees: Doctor of Laws from Tougaloo College, Doctor of Laws from Indiana University, and Doctor of Science from Purdue University. Washington has also toured and studied the educational systems of Taiwan and seven African countries, sponsored by the Republic of China, and Africa.

Washington was the first African-American to receive a doctorate in Mississippi.

Washington retired from Alcorn State University in 1994 after 25 years of service. Prior to being appointed president of Alcorn in 1969, he was President of what was then Utica Junior College for twelve years. Before coming to Utica Junior College, he had been serving as principal of Sumner Hill in Clinton, Mississippi. The combined 37 years of continuous service made him the longest serving college president in Mississippi and around the nation.

== Civic and professional memberships ==
Washington held membership in several professional organizations, including Kappa Delta Phi, Phi Delta Kappa, and Alpha Kappa Mu Honorary Society. He served on boards and advisory councils in and out of the State, including the Board of Directors of Mississippi Power and Light Company, Entergy Corporation, Blue Cross Blue Shield of Mississippi, National Association for Equal Opportunity in Higher Education and the National Commission for Cooperative Education. He has also served as a member of the Liaison Committee on Medical Education (LCME), the Advisory Council of the National Urban League's Black Executive Exchange Program, the Commission on Colleges of the Southern Association of Colleges and Schools, the President's Council of the State University Presidents, and the U.S. President's Advisory Council on Historically Black Colleges and Universities. He was a past president of the Mississippi Teachers Association and held membership in the Mississippi Association of Educators and the National Education Association.

Washington was also a life member of Alpha Phi Alpha fraternity. He served two terms as Southern regional Vice President (1966–1971), and two terms as General President (1972–1976). He presided over the 70th Anniversary Convention of Alpha Phi Alpha fraternity in Liberia, Africa in 1975. Additionally, he was a charter member of Beta Gamma Boule' of Sigma Pi Phi fraternity.

== Honors and awards ==
Washington has received numerous honors and awards during his long and illustrious career. Among them, he has received the Silver Beaver Award from Boy Scouts of America, the Distinguished Service Award and Distinguished Alumni Award from Peabody College, the Service to Humanity Award from Mississippi College, and the State and National 4-H Alumnus Recognition Awards. In 1982, he was awarded the Outstanding Presidential Cluster Citation by President Ronald Reagan. He was inducted into the Hall of Fame of the University of Southern Mississippi Alumni Association; received an Award of Distinction in 1990 from the University of Mississippi; and received the 1993 George Washington Carver Public Service Hall of Fame Award from Tuskegee University. Buildings are named in his honor on the campuses of Alcorn State University, Tougaloo College, University of Southern Mississippi and Hinds Community College ( formerly Utica Junior College).

Washington was named among Ebony Magazine's 100 Most Influential Black Americans in 1974, 1975 and 1976. He was named by the Jackson Daily News panel as one of the twelve most influential Mississippians during the decade of the 70's. Washington hosted President George H.W. Bush as keynote speaker for Alcorn's 118th commencement exercises in 1989. He received the Man of the Year Award, the Southern Region Outstanding Achievement Award, the Distinguished Educator's Award, the Distinguished Service Award, and the Southern Region Leadership Award from Alpha Phi Alpha Fraternity. He was also selected as Man of the Year in Education in 1981 by Total Living for Fifty Plus.

Preceded by Ernest Morial	General President of Alpha Phi Alpha; 1973-1976	Succeeded by James R. Williams
