= James A. Lantz =

American politician (1921–2014)

Speaker of the Ohio House of Representatives
- In office 1958–1961
- Preceded by: William B. Saxbe
- Succeeded by: Charles F. Kurfess

Ohio State Auditor
- In office 1962–1963
- Preceded by: Chester W. Gobl
- Succeeded by: Archer E. Reily

Ohio House Representative
- In office 1953–1963

Personal details
- Born: September 15, 1921 Fairfield County, Ohio
- Died: June 19, 2014 (aged 92) Lancaster, Ohio
- Resting place: Forest Rose Cemetery, Lancaster, Ohio
- Party: Democratic

James A. Lantz (September 15, 1921 – June 19, 2014) was an American lawyer and politician.

Born in Fairfield County, Ohio, Lantz served in the United States Army Air Forces as a pilot. He received his bachelor's degree from Denison University and his law degree from Moritz College of Law. Lantz then practiced law in Lancaster, Ohio. From 1953 to 1963, Lantz served as a Democrat in the Ohio House of Representatives and was speaker in 1959. Lantz lost the Democratic primary election for Lieutenant Governor of Ohio. He returned to his law practice in Lancaster, Ohio, and was involved in the insurance business. Lantz died in Lancaster, Ohio.
