= James R. Williams (lawyer) =

American judge and politician (1936–2020)

Municipal Court
- In office 1983–1989

Court of Common Pleas
- In office 1989–2003
- Preceded by: John Reece

Personal details
- Born: 1936 Columbus, Mississippi, US
- Died: November 6, 2020 (aged 83–84) Akron, Ohio, US
- Resting place: Ohio Western Reserve National Cemetery
- Education: University of Akron
- Occupation: Lawyer and judge

James R. Williams (1936 – November 6, 2020) was a U.S. lawyer, jurist, Civil Rights leader, and politician. He was named one of the 100 most influential Black Americans by Ebony magazine.

== Early life ==
James R. Williams was born in Columbus, Mississippi in 1936. Following his service in the United States Army, he moved to Ohio.

He attended the University of Akron, graduating with a BA in education in 1960. While in college, he was a member of Alpha Phi Alpha fraternity.

He received his Juris Doctor degree from University of Akron in 1966.

== Career ==
After college, William taught for the Akron Public Schools. He was then a senior staff member with the city's department of planning and urban development. After graduating from law school, he was a lawyer with offices in Cleveland, Ohio.

Williams was elected to the City Council of Akron, Ohio. In this capacity, he supported gun control. In 1974, he was the Democratic Party candidate for Lieutenant Governor of Ohio.

In 1978, President Jimmy Carter appointed him as the U.S. Attorney for the Northern District of Ohio. He unsuccessfully ran for the 9th District Court of Appeals in 1982. In 1983, he became a judge in the Akron Municipal Court. In 1989, he was elected to the Summit County's court of common pleas. He was the first Black judge of the county's court of common pleas and served for fifteen years, retiring in 2005.

== Personal life ==
Williams was married to Cathy Williams who died in 2002. They had two children, Michael and Jacqueline. He then married Jewell Cardwell in 2019.

Williams was the 25th General President of Alpha Phi Alpha fraternity. As president, he was named one of the 100 most influential Black Americans by Ebony magazine. Williams is also the principal founder of Akron-based Alpha Phi Alpha Education Foundation and the principal founder and first president of Alpha Phi Alpha Homes. Established in 1966, the latter provided housing for low-income people and seniors.

He was a civil right leader who worked with the Akron and Ohio branches of the NAACP. He was a board member of the Akron Children's Hospital, the Akron City Club, Akron Community Foundation, the Akron Roundtable, Leadership Akron, the Red Cross, the Salvation Army, and the University of Akron Foundation.

Williams died on November 6, 2020, in Akron, Ohio at the age of 88. He was buried in the Ohio Western Reserve National Cemetery.

== Honors ==
Williams received the Alumni Honor Award from the University of Akron in 1990. Alpha Phi Alpha named a 148-until apartment building for seniors The James R. Williams Tower. The University of Akron has the Honorable James R. and Catherine D. Williams Scholarship Fund.

Preceded by Walter Washington	General President of Alpha Phi Alpha; 1977-1980	Succeeded by Ozell Sutton
