= A. William Sweeney =

American judge

Asher William Sweeney

Ohio Supreme Court Justice
- In office January 1, 1977 – December 31, 1994
- Preceded by: J. J. P. Corrigan
- Succeeded by: Deborah L. Cook

Personal details
- Born: December 11, 1920 Canfield, Ohio
- Died: December 28, 2003 (aged 83) Cincinnati, Ohio
- Resting place: Grandview Cemetery, Salem, Ohio
- Party: Democratic
- Spouse: Bertha Marie Englert
- Children: four
- Education: Youngstown State University; Duke University Law School

Military service
- Allegiance: United States
- Branch/service: United States Army
- Rank: Colonel
- Battles/wars: World War II, Pacific Theater; Korean War
- Awards: Bronze Star; Silver Star; Legion of Merit

Asher William Sweeney (December 11, 1920 – December 28, 2003) was an American soldier and lawyer who served in the United States Army in World War II and the Korean War before spending 18 years as a justice of the Ohio Supreme Court.

== Biography ==
Sweeney was born in Canfield, Ohio, on December 11, 1920, to Walter W. and Jessie Kidd Sweeney. He worked in steel mills in Youngstown while attending Youngstown State University. In 1942 he entered the United States Army, and served in the South Pacific Theater during World War II, rising to rank of lieutenant.

Sweeney graduated from Duke University Law School in 1948, and was admitted to the bar in Ohio in 1949. He worked in the Industrial Relations Department of Republic Steel in Youngstown until 1951.

In 1951, Sweeney re-entered the Army, and fought with the 7th Infantry Division in Korea, earning Bronze and Silver Stars for meritorious service.

He had a very strong sense of life and living. He was always a defender of the downtrodden, people who didn't have a voice. He did what he thought was right.
—Randall Sweeney, son

While still in active service, Sweeney ran unsuccessfully for Ohio Secretary of State in 1958 as the Democratic nominee. He retired from the Army as a colonel after serving as chief of the Federal Contracting Agency in Cincinnati. President Johnson awarded him the Legion of Merit in 1968. He also worked at the U. S. Embassy in France, 1959 and 1960, and with the Judge Advocate General at the Department of Defense. Sweeney was inducted into the U.S. Army Infantry Hall of Fame at Fort Benning, Georgia, in 1981.

Sweeney was unsuccessful in the Democratic primary for Lieutenant Governor of Ohio in 1970 and 1974, and was elected to the Ohio Supreme Court in 1976. He was elected to two more six-year terms, and served 18 years before being forced to retire because he exceeded Ohio's 70-year age limit on running for election for judge. He served January 1, 1977, to December 31, 1994.

After retirement from the court, Sweeney was appointed to administer Ohio's Victim of Crime Compensation Fund as commissioner for the Ohio Court of Claims. Sweeney died at Jewish Hospital in Cincinnati, and is buried at Grandview Cemetery in Salem, Ohio.

Sweeney was married to Bertha Marie Englert of Salem in 1945. They had four children.

== Medals ==
- Bronze Star
- Silver Star
- Legion of Merit

Party political offices
Preceded by Hubert Lynch	Democratic nominee for Ohio Secretary of State; 1958	Succeeded by Charles L. Babcock
