= John W. Donahey =

American politician

- John W. Donahey in January 1961

53rd Lieutenant Governor of Ohio
- In office January 12, 1959 – January 14, 1963
- Governor: Michael DiSalle
- Preceded by: Paul M. Herbert
- Succeeded by: John William Brown

Personal details
- Born: August 26, 1905 New Philadelphia, Ohio, U.S.
- Died: March 2, 1967 (aged 61) Columbus, Ohio, U.S.
- Resting place: East Avenue Cemetery, New Philadelphia, Ohio
- Party: Democratic
- Spouse: Gertrude Walton (m.1930-1967, his death)
- Relations: A. Victor Donahey (father); William Donahey (uncle)
- Children: 1
- Education: Ohio State University (attended); Cleveland College of Western Reserve University (attended)
- Profession: Insurance agent Government official

John William Donahey (August 26, 1905 – March 2, 1967) was an American businessman, government official, and politician from Ohio. A Democrat, he was most notable for his service as the 53rd lieutenant governor of Ohio from 1959 to 1963.

A native of New Philadelphia, Ohio, and the son of Governor and U.S. Senator A. Victor Donahey, John Donahey attended Ohio State University and Cleveland College, and supplemented his education with professional development courses through the American Institute of Banking.

During his father's governorship, Donahey served as a clerk in the governor's office. In 1930, he married Gertrude Walton, who served as a senior staff member for U.S. Senator Stephen M. Young and as Ohio State Treasurer. From 1933 to 1951, Donahey was employed as a loan examiner with the Reconstruction Finance Corporation.

In 1952, Donahey was an unsuccessful candidate for U.S. Senator. In 1954 and 1956, he ran unsuccessfully for state treasurer. In 1958, he was the successful Democratic nominee for lieutenant governor and he served from 1959 to 1963. In 1962, Donahey was the unsuccessful Democratic nominee for state auditor. After leaving office, Donahey worked as the Small Business Administration's regional director for Ohio.

Donahey died at Grant Hospital in Columbus, Ohio, on March 5, 1967, after he suffered a heart attack while recovering from surgery. He was buried at East Avenue Cemetery in New Philadelphia.

== Early life ==
Donahey was born in New Philadelphia, Ohio, on August 26, 1905, a son of A. Victor Donahey and Mary (Harvey) Donahey. He was educated in the public schools of Columbus and New Philadelphia and was a 1926 graduate of New Philadelphia High School.

As a teenager and young man, Donahey worked at a variety of temporary jobs, including an assembly line job at an Overland Automobile factory in Toledo, and crew member on a lighthouse tender that provided maintenance to facilities on the coast of Central America. After high school, Donahey attended Ohio State University and Cleveland College, the adult education campus of Western Reserve University. He later took professional development courses through the American Institute of Banking.

== Start of career ==
During his father's term as governor, Donahey served as the commission clerk in the governor's office. He subsequently worked as a field supervisor for the Motorists’ Mutual Insurance Company of Columbus and the Donahey Insurance Agency. Donahey married Gertrude Walton in 1930. She was a longtime senior staff member for U.S. Senator Stephen M. Young, then served twelve years (1971-1983) as Ohio State Treasurer. They were the parents of a son, John W. Donahey Jr. (1935-2006).

In 1933, Donahey joined the Reconstruction Finance Corporation, where he worked as a loan examiner until 1951. After leaving the RFC, Donahey was the founder and president of Poco Corporation. Poco was a venture which conducted research and experimentation to identify new industrial, food, and farming uses for surplus grain.

== Political career ==
A Democrat in politics, Donahey was an unsuccessful candidate for U.S. Senator in 1952. He ran unsuccessfully for state treasurer in 1954 and again in 1956.

In 1958, Donahey ran successfully for lieutenant governor. He served one term, 1959 to 1963. As lieutenant governor, Donahey prioritized economy and low taxes, and set an example by returning to the state treasury part of the budget for his office at the end of each fiscal year.

In 1962, Donahey was the unsuccessful Democratic nominee for state auditor. After leaving office, Donahey worked as the Small Business Administration's regional director for Ohio.

== Death and burial ==
In February 1967, Donahey was admitted to Grant Hospital in Columbus, where he underwent surgery. During his post-surgery recovery, Donahey suffered a fatal heart attack, and he died on March 2. Donahey was buried at East Avenue Cemetery in New Philadelphia.

Party political offices
| Preceded by Joseph T. Ferguson | Democratic nominee for Treasurer of Ohio; 1956 | Succeeded by Joseph T. Ferguson |
| Preceded by John Taylor | Democratic nominee for Lieutenant Governor of Ohio; 1958 | Succeeded by John J. Gallagher |
| Preceded by James D. Ferguson | Democratic nominee for Auditor of Ohio; 1962 | Succeeded by Clarence H. Knisley |
Political offices
| Preceded by Paul M. Herbert | Lieutenant Governor of Ohio; 1959–1963 | Succeeded by John William Brown |
