= Paul M. Herbert =

American judge

47th, 49th and 52nd Lieutenant Governor of Ohio
- In office January 9, 1939 – January 8, 1945
- Governor: John W. Bricker
- Preceded by: Paul P. Yoder
- Succeeded by: George D. Nye
- In office January 13, 1947 – January 10, 1949
- Governor: Thomas J. Herbert
- Preceded by: George D. Nye
- Succeeded by: George D. Nye
- In office January 14, 1957 – January 12, 1959
- Governor: C. William O'Neill
- Preceded by: John William Brown
- Succeeded by: John W. Donahey

Associate Justice of the Ohio Supreme Court
- In office January 1, 1963 – December 31, 1968
- Preceded by: Thomas J. Herbert
- Succeeded by: Thomas M. Herbert

Member of the Ohio House of Representatives
- In office 1923–1926

Personal details
- Born: Paul Morgan Herbert; December 2, 1889 Marseilles, Ohio, U.S.
- Died: July 5, 1983 (aged 93) Dublin, Ohio, U.S.
- Resting place: Union Cemetery, Somerset, Ohio
- Party: Republican
- Spouse: Ruby F. Thomas
- Education: University of Michigan; Moritz College of Law

Paul Morgan Herbert (December 2, 1889 – July 5, 1983) was an American politician of the Republican Party who served three separate tenures as the 47th, 49th and 52nd lieutenant governor of Ohio. He was born in Marseilles, Ohio.

During the First World War, Herbert served in the United States Army. From 1922 to 1926, he served as a member of the Ohio House of Representatives and then was elected to the Ohio State Senate, where he served from 1926 to 1930.

In 1938, he was elected to the lieutenant governorship for the first time and began his service in 1939. In 1940, he won re-election by defeating challenger Robert S. Cox. He won a third term in 1942 against George D. Nye. His first stint as lieutenant governor ended in 1945.

In 1946, Herbert unseated Nye from the lieutenant governorship, which he had won in 1944. He took office again in 1947. However, he served only one term since he lost to Nye in 1948. Herbert ran again for the office in 1956 and defeated John Taylor. However, he was again limited to one term and was unseated in 1958 by John W. Donahey.

Herbert served as a justice of the Ohio Supreme Court from 1963 to 1969. He died in 1983 in Dublin, Ohio, and is interred at Union Cemetery in Somerset, Ohio.

Herbert was married to Ruby F. Thomas on August 15, 1924. They had two children.

== External sources ==
- "Past Commanders of American Legion Franklin Post 1" (PDF). Department of Ohio. p. 4. Archived from the original (PDF) on 2012-03-31. – photo, was American Legion Post Commander in 1921
- Paul M. Herbert at Find a Grave

Party political offices
Preceded by	Republican nominee for Lieutenant Governor of Ohio; 1938, 1940, 1942	Succeeded by M. Herbert Hoover
Preceded by M. Herbert Hoover	Republican nominee for Lieutenant Governor of Ohio; 1946, 1948	Succeeded by J. Eugene Roberts
Preceded by John William Brown	Republican nominee for Lieutenant Governor of Ohio; 1956, 1958	Succeeded by John William Brown
Legal offices
Preceded by Thomas J. Herbert	Ohio Supreme Court Justice; January 1, 1963-December 31, 1968	Succeeded by Thomas M. Herbert
Political offices
Preceded by Paul P. Yoder	Lieutenant Governor of Ohio; January 9, 1939-January 8, 1945	Succeeded by George D. Nye
Preceded by George D. Nye	Lieutenant Governor of Ohio; January 13, 1947-January 10, 1949	Succeeded by George D. Nye
Preceded by John William Brown	Lieutenant Governor of Ohio; January 14, 1957-January 12, 1959	Succeeded by John W. Donahey
Ohio Senate
Preceded by John Martin Vorys; C. C. Chappelear	Senator from 10th District; 1927-1930; Served alongside: C. C. Chappelear	Succeeded by unidentified
Ohio House of Representatives
Preceded by Herbert S. Atkinson; Henry W. Frillman; William C. Wendt	Representative from Franklin County; 1923-1926; Served alongside: Herbert S. Atkinson (1923-1924); Denny Cross (1925-1926); Henry W. Frillman (1923-1924); Viola D. Romans (1925-1926); William C. Wendt (1923-1926); John Martin Vorys (1923-1924)	Succeeded by Viola D. Romans; Grant P. Ward; Jacob Woehrle; William C. Wendt
