= Ben Skall =

American politician

Member of the Ohio Senate from the 22nd district
- In office January 3, 1981 – May 20, 1984
- Preceded by: Anthony O. Calabrese
- Succeeded by: Grace L. Drake

Personal details
- Born: February 11, 1919 Cleveland, Ohio, U.S.
- Died: October 25, 1993 (aged 74) Beachwood, Ohio, U.S.
- Party: Republican

Ben M. Skall (February 11, 1919 – October 25, 1993) was a member of the Ohio Senate, serving from 1981 to 1984. He represented the 22nd District, which was based out of Cuyahoga County, Ohio.
