= Anthony O. Calabrese =

American politician

Anthony O Calabrese Sr.
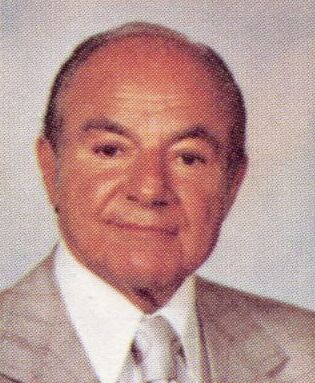

Member of the Ohio Senate from the 22nd district
- In office January 3, 1956-December 31, 1980
- Preceded by: Districts Created
- Succeeded by: Ben Skall

Personal details
- Born: Orlando Anthony Calabrese; July 20, 1907 Forli del Sannio, Italy
- Died: July 8, 1991 (aged 83)
- Party: Democratic

Anthony Orlando Calabrese, Sr. (July 20, 1907 – July 8, 1991) was an American politician of the Democratic party who served as a member of the Ohio Senate. He was the first Italian American to serve as Minority Leader of the Ohio Senate.

Calabrese, born as Orlando Anthony Calabrese in Forli del Sannio, Italy, immigrated to the United States in 1920 at the age of 13 and loved his new home in Cleveland, Ohio. He, and his wife, Mary (née Buzzelli) were the parents of two sons, Anthony O. Calabrese, Jr., and Leonard M. Calabrese. Both sons are still active contributing members to the city of Cleveland. Anthony O. Calabrese. Jr., has served the local and state government in several elected and appointed positions and Leonard M. Calabrese has worked for the Catholic Diocese of Cleveland during his long and dedicated service. He has been President of Catholic Community Connection since 2008. In 1970, Anthony O. Calabrese was the Democratic nominee for the office of Lieutenant Governor of Ohio. He chaired Italo-Americans for Kennedy in 1960, Italian Americans for Johnson in 1964 and Italian Americans for Humphrey in 1968. He also co-chaired the Nationalities Division of the Ohio Democratic Party in those years. Anthony O. Calabrese was also a national leader among Italian Americans, serving for many years as a leader in the Sons of Italy in America culminating in becoming the First Supreme Venerable and also helping to found the Commission on Social Justice. He was awarded the Cross of Merit from the Republic of Italy for his civic and humanitarian work, especially advocating for orphans and earthquake victims in Italy and for immigrants in the United States. He testified before Congressional committees in 1965 in favor of the historic Immigration Reform Act which was signed by President Johnson, ending discriminatory provisions against Italians and other groups. Calabrese was also the sponsor of legislation making Columbus Day a legal holiday in Ohio and worked for that nationally. He was also a leader in establishing Cleveland State University, Cuyahoga Community College, and the Golden Buckeye Card, as well as being a champion for the developmentally disabled, senior citizens, veterans, and the working poor. He was regarded as a friend of Labor and a fighter for the "little guy." His famous slogan was "What do you want? Good grammar or Good government?"

Anthony O. Calabrese Sr., and Jr., served as the only father-son elected representatives in the Ohio senate. He also was the grandfather of Anthony O. Calabrese III, who pleaded guilty to racketeering, bribery, conspiracy and obstruction charges after his indictment on 18 federal public corruption charges.

== See also ==
- List of Ohio lieutenant gubernatorial elections

Party political offices
Preceded by William L. Coleman	Democratic nominee for Lieutenant Governor of Ohio; 1970	Succeeded by Dick Celeste
