= 1877 Ohio gubernatorial election =

- October 9, 1877
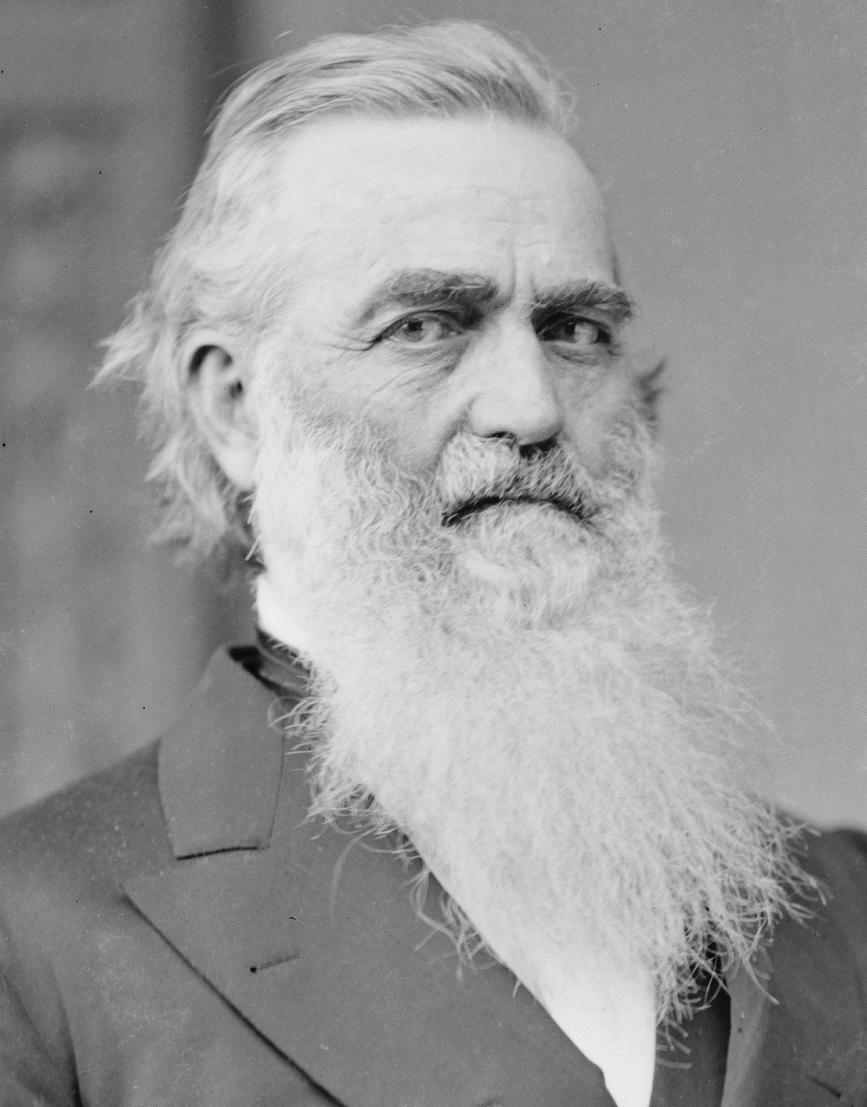

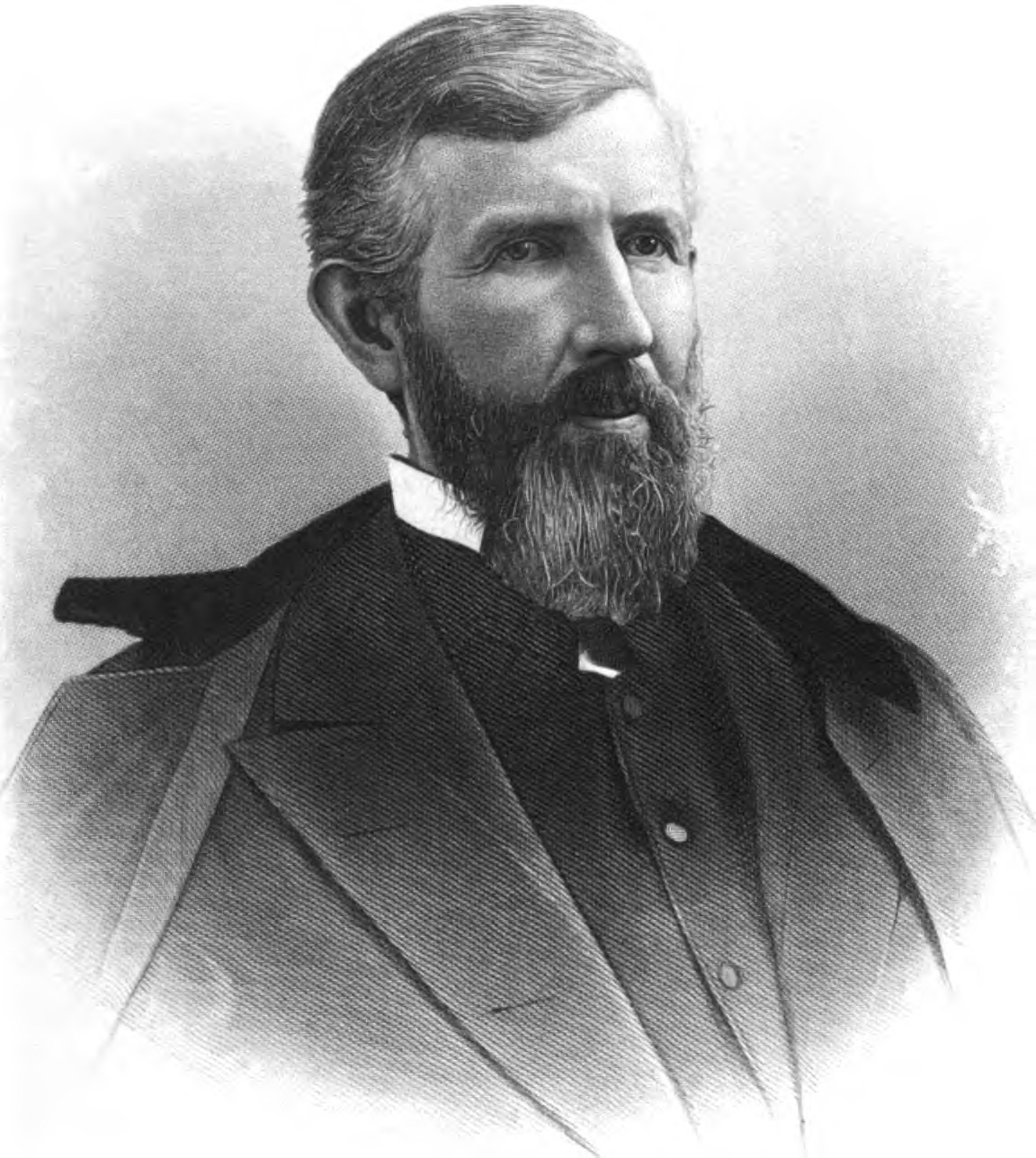
Nominee	Richard M. Bishop	William H. West
Party	Democratic	Republican
Popular vote	271,625	249,105
Percentage	48.94%	44.88%
County results
Bishop
40–50%
50–60%
60–70%
70–80%
West
40–50%
50–60%
60–70%
70–80%
Johnson
40–50%
Tie
40–50%
Governor before election
Thomas L. Young
Republican
Elected Governor
Richard M. Bishop
Democratic

The 1877 Ohio gubernatorial election was held on October 9, 1877. Democratic nominee Richard M. Bishop defeated Republican nominee William H. West with 48.94% of the vote.

== General election ==
=== Candidates ===
Major party candidates

- Richard M. Bishop, Democratic
- William H. West, Republican

Other candidates

- Stephen Johnson, Independent
- Lewis H. Bond, Greenback
- Henry Adams Thompson, Prohibition

=== Results ===
1877 Ohio gubernatorial election
Party	Candidate	Votes	%	±%
Democratic	Richard M. Bishop	271,625	48.94%	
Republican	William H. West	249,105	44.88%	
Independent	Stephen Johnson	16,912	3.05%	
Greenback	Lewis H. Bond	12,489	2.25%	
Prohibition	Henry Adams Thompson	4,836	0.87%	
Majority		22,520		
Turnout				
Democratic gain from Republican		Swing		
