= H. W. Curtiss =

American politician (1824–1902)

Harvey Willard Curtiss
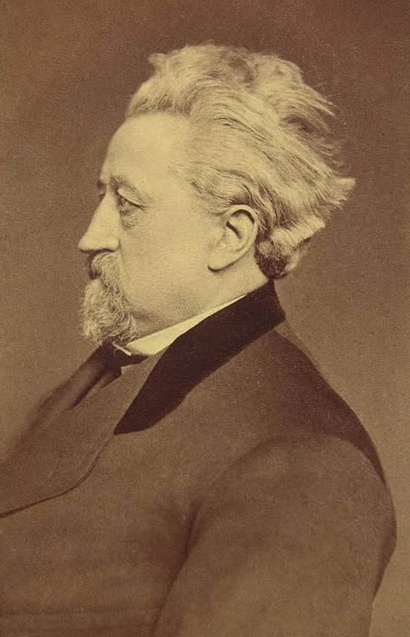

13th Lieutenant Governor of Ohio
- In office March 2, 1877 – January 14, 1878
- Governor: Thomas L. Young
- Preceded by: Thomas L. Young
- Succeeded by: Jabez W. Fitch

Member of the Ohio Senate from the 25th district
- In office January 5, 1874 – January 4, 1880 Serving with William Bingham (1874-75); J. C. Schenck (1876-77)
- Preceded by: Benjamin R. Bevis; Allen T. Brinsmade
- Succeeded by: Peter Hitchcock; Thomas J. Carson

Member of the Ohio House of Representatives from the Cuyahoga County district
- In office January 3, 1870 – January 4, 1874

Personal details
- Born: February 23, 1824 Charlestown Township, U.S.
- Died: April 30, 1902 (aged 78) Chagrin Falls, Ohio, U.S.
- Party: Republican
- Spouse: Olive B. Rood
- Children: four
- Education: Grand River Institute; Western College of Homeopathy, Cleveland
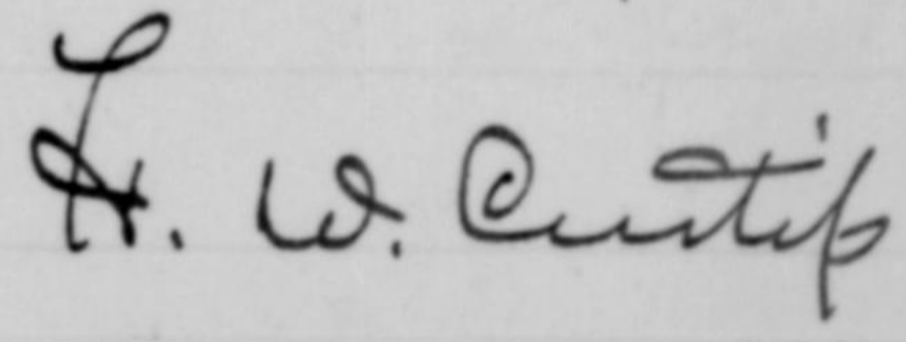
- Signature

Harvey Willard Curtiss (February 22, 1824 – April 30, 1902) was a Republican legislator from the U.S. state of Ohio who, as the president of the Ohio Senate, became the 13th lieutenant governor of Ohio 1877–1878 when the governor resigned, and the previous lieutenant governor succeeded to the governorship.

== Biography ==
Harvey Willard Curtiss was born at Charlestown Township, Portage County, Ohio February 22, 1824, or perhaps 1823. He graduated from the Grand River Institute, and began study of medicine in 1849. He graduated from the Cleveland Medical College, or Western College of Homeopathy in 1851, and located in Pittsburgh, Pennsylvania to practice medicine for a short time before locating in Chagrin Falls, Ohio, where lived the rest of his life. H. W. Curtiss married Olive B. Rood of Charlestown in 1845.

== Career ==
Curtiss was an abolitionist, and his home was a stop on the Underground Railroad. He was among the first in Cuyahoga County, Ohio to join the newly formed Republican Party. He was on the City Council of Chagrin Falls, and was mayor from 1861 to 1865. Curtiss was elected to the Ohio House of Representatives in 1869 and 1871, and to the Ohio State Senate in 1873, 1875 and 1877. In the spring of 1877, Rutherford B. Hayes resigned as Governor of Ohio to become President of the United States. Lieutenant Governor of Ohio Thomas L. Young became governor, and Curtiss, as President pro tem of the Senate, became acting lieutenant governor. Curtiss was also a school board member for eighteen years, and was president of the Western Reserve Pioneer Association for twenty years. After he retired from politics, he practiced medicine until about 1900.

== Death ==
Curtiss died at Chagrin Falls on April 30, 1902. His wife, Olive, survived him with three children. Another son died at age thirteen.

Political offices
Preceded by Thomas Lowry Young	Lieutenant Governor of Ohio; 1877-1878	Succeeded by Andrew Hickenlooper
