= Statue of John Witherspoon =

Statue by William Couper in Washington, D.C., U.S.

- Doctor John Witherspoon
- U.S. Historic district – Contributing property
- D.C. Inventory of Historic Sites
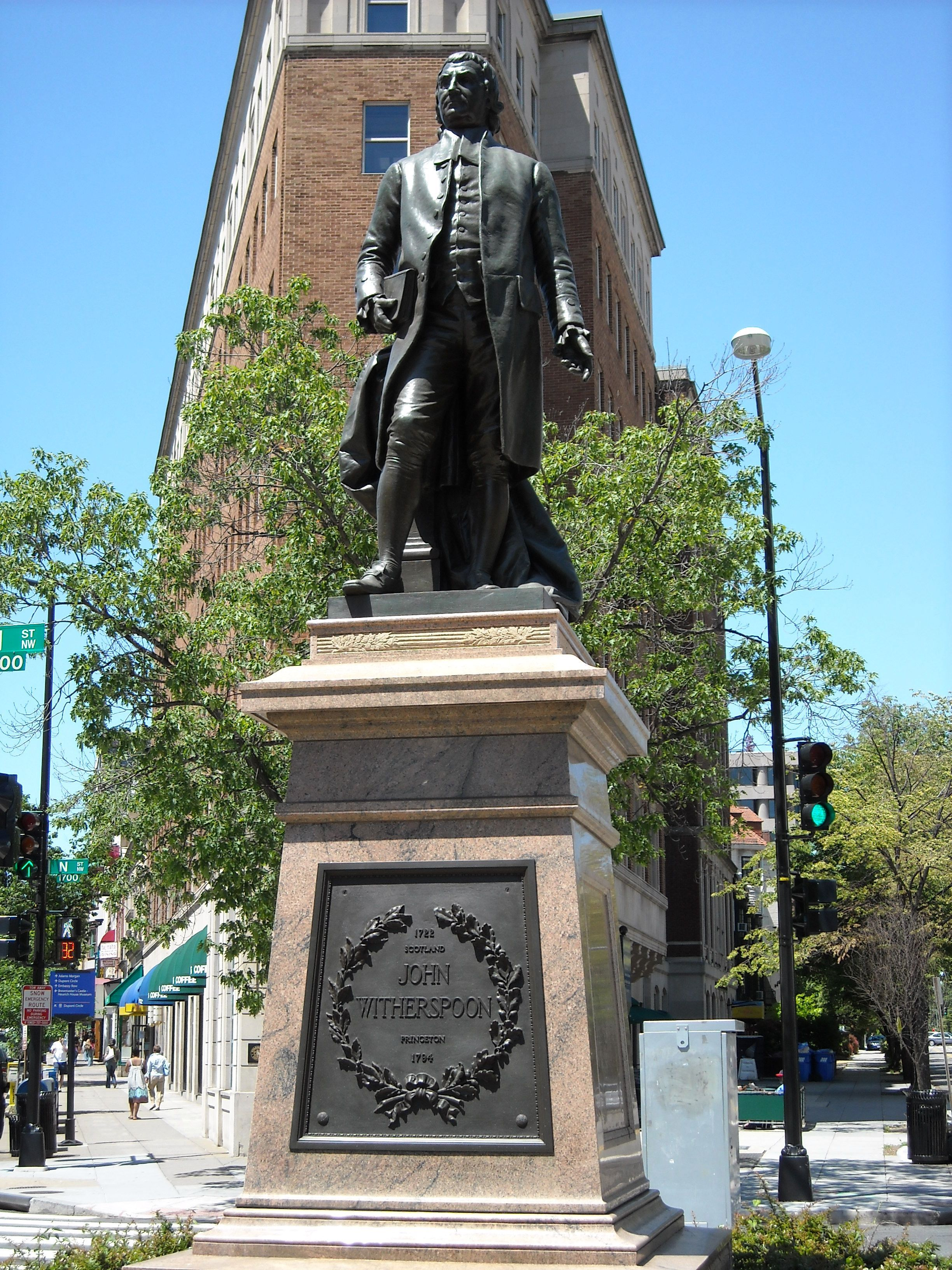
- Statue of John Witherspoon
- Location: Intersection of 18th Street NW, Connecticut Avenue, and N Street NW, Washington, D.C.
- Coordinates: 38°54′25.8″N 77°2′30.4″W
- Built: 1909
- Architect: William Couper (sculptor); Roman Bronze Works (founder)
- Part of: • American Revolution Statuary (78000256) • Dupont Circle (85000238) • L'Enfant Plan (97000332)

Significant dates
- Designated CP: • July 14, 1978 (American Revolution Statuary) • February 6, 1985 (Dupont Circle) • April 24, 1997 (L'Enfant Plan)
- Designated DCIHS: March 3, 1979

Doctor John Witherspoon is a bronze sculpture and granite pedestal which depicts John Witherspoon, a Presbyterian minister, member of Congress, and signer of the United States Declaration of Independence. Born in Scotland, Witherspoon immigrated to the U.S. in the 1760s and later became president of the College of New Jersey, later renamed Princeton University. He strongly supported the Thirteen Colonies in their fight to gain freedom from the United Kingdom of Great Britain and Ireland. He served as the only clergyman in the Second Continental Congress during the American Revolutionary War. In 1792, Witherspoon lost his eyesight after an infection and died two years later. It was not until over 100 years later that plans were made to erect a statue of Witherspoon in Washington, D.C.

Members of the Church of the Covenant (now known as National Presbyterian Church) and other Presbyterians formed the Witherspoon Memorial Association in 1907. After raising enough funds for the memorial, they lobbied members of Congress for permission to erect the memorial on public land. The joint resolution passed in 1908. By that time, sculptor William Couper had begun working on the statue. The following year the memorial was dedicated. Prominent attendees at the event included future president Woodrow Wilson, Vice President James S. Sherman, former Secretary of State John W. Foster, and British Ambassador James Bryce, 1st Viscount Bryce.

The memorial is located at the intersection of 18th Street NW, Connecticut Avenue, and N Street NW, in the Dupont Circle neighborhood. The statue is bronze and depicts Witherspoon holding a Bible. On the memorial's pedestal is a quote from Witherspoon. When the Church of the Covenant was razed in 1966, church members wanted the statue moved to its new location, but the government denied their request. The memorial is one of fourteen American Revolution Statuary collectively listed on the National Register of Historic Places and the District of Columbia Inventory of Historic Sites. The memorial is also a contributing property to the Dupont Circle Historic District and the L'Enfant Plan.

== Biography ==
John Witherspoon (1722–1794) was born in Scotland and immigrated to the Thirteen Colonies in the 1760s, at the request of Benjamin Rush and Richard Stockton. Witherspoon was a Presbyterian and dedicated his life to helping the denomination. He served as president of the College of New Jersey, now known as Princeton University, from 1768 until his death. Recent research by Princeton University and independent historians has documented Witherspoon's direct involvement in slavery during his presidency at Princeton. Archival tax records reveal that Witherspoon owned at least two enslaved people at his Tusculum estate, with explicit listings in the New Jersey tax ratables from the 1780s. Throughout his tenure as Princeton's president, Witherspoon's household maintained enslaved laborers, and he openly opposed abolitionist efforts in New Jersey, arguing against immediate legislative emancipation..

In 1774, Witherspoon became active in the movement for independence from the Kingdom of Great Britain. During the American Revolution, Witherspoon was deeply involved to the cause. He led the movement to remove William Franklin, son of Benjamin Franklin, from office as the Colonial Governor of New Jersey. He signed the United States Declaration of Independence and served as the only clergyman in the Second Continental Congress in Philadelphia from June 1777 until 1782. He returned to the College of New Jersey after the American Revolutionary War had concluded, in order to restore the prestige of the college. He was an adamant supporter of the 1787 drafting of the U.S. Constitution. He played a large role in unifying various Presbyterian groups to become the Presbyterian Church in the United States of America.

According to historian James Moore Goode, Witherspoon "was highly respected by his colleagues for his unfaltering devotion to independence and to the unifying of the colonies into one nation possessing a strong central government." Witherspoon lost his sight after an eye infection in 1792 and died two years later at Tusculum.

== Memorial ==
=== Planning ===
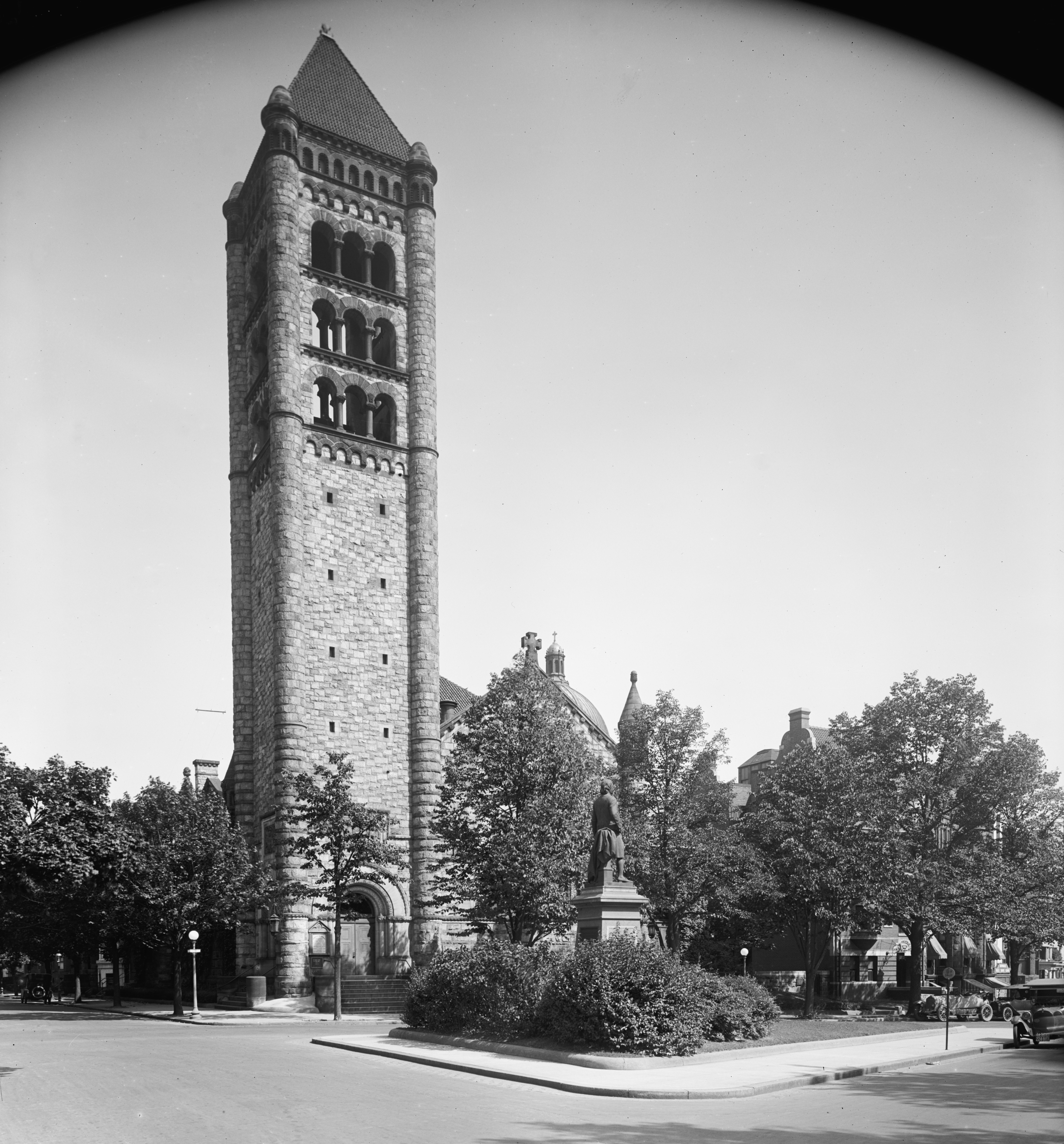
The Witherspoon memorial in 1920 with the Church of the Covenant in the background

In 1907, the Witherspoon Memorial Association (WMA) was formed to raise funds for a memorial to Witherspoon in Washington, D.C. At the time, there were no sculptures of signers of the Declaration of Independence in the nation's capital. Many public land lots throughout the city were being filled with statues and memorials, so members of the Church of the Covenant (later named the National Presbyterian Church) lobbied members of Congress to support the erection of the memorial to Witherspoon. After funding was raised by church members and members of the public, Congress passed the joint resolution on May 27, 1908, for the memorial's erection on public land. Congress also agreed to provide the WMA with $4,000 for the statue's pedestal. The statue was founded by Roman Bronze Works.

=== Artist ===
William Couper was commissioned to create the statue. In addition to the Witherspoon statue, he sculpted the nearby Henry Wadsworth Longfellow Memorial. Other works Couper is known for include the statue of Joseph Bryan in Richmond, a bust of Charles Darwin for the American Museum of Natural History, Captain John Smith in Jamestown, and a statue of New York City Mayor Abram Hewitt. He sculpted a statue of Flora for the World's Columbian Exposition in 1893 and the Pan-American Exposition in 1901.

=== Location and design ===
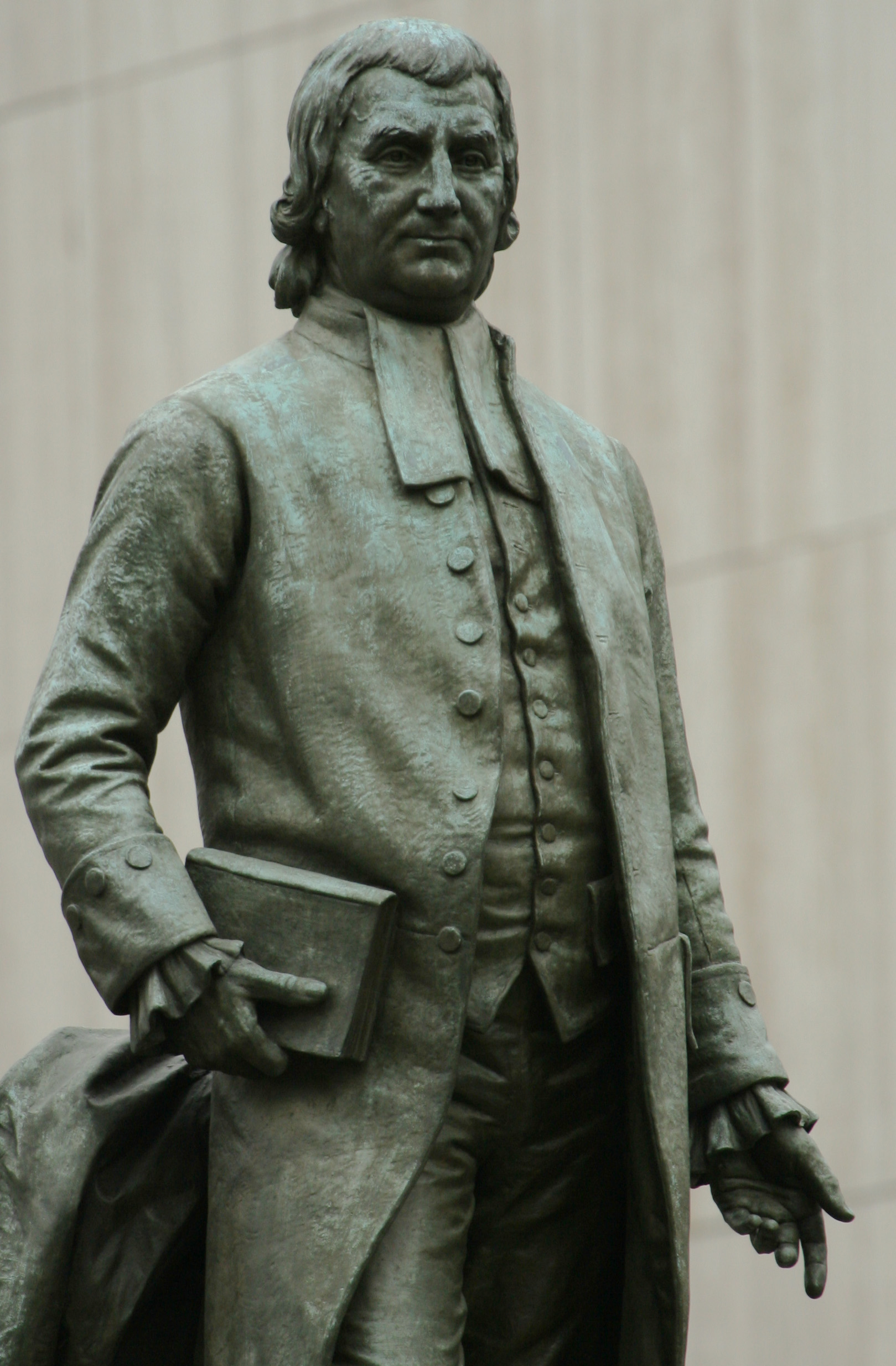
Witherspoon statue close-up

The Witherspoon memorial is located on Reservation 150A, in a small plot of land at the intersection of 18th Street NW, Connecticut Avenue, and N Street NW, in the Dupont Circle neighborhood. The memorial was originally near the façade of the Church of the Covenant. It was moved to a nearby triangular plot when the Church of the Covenant was razed in 1966.

The bronze statue of Witherspoon, measuring approximately 8-feet (2.4 m) tall, stands on a 9-foot (2.7 m) pedestal made of Stoney Creek granite. Witherspoon is depicted with colonial era clothing, including a long coat and vest. His right leg is further out than the rest of his body and his right hand is holding a copy of the Bible. His cloak is lying on a pedestal behind him. His hair is tucked behind his ears. The pedestal is a stepped stone base. There is a plaque on the south (front) and north sides of the memorial.

The inscriptions on the memorial are the following:

(base of statue, west side)
Wm Couper, New York

(base of statue, east side)
Roman Bronze works, NY

(south side)
1722
SCOTLAND
JOHN
WITHERSPOON
PRINCETON
1794

(west side)
SIGNER OF
THE
DECLARATION
OF INDEPENDENCE

(east side)
PRESBYTERIAN
MINISTER

(north side)
FOR MY OWN PART, OF PROPERTY
I HAVE SOME, OF REPUTATION MORE
THAT REPUTATION IS STAKED,
THAT PROPERTY IS PLEDGED ON
THE ISSUE OF THIS CONTEST AND
ALTHOUGH THESE GRAY HAIRS MUST
SOON DESCEND IN THE SEPUL-
CHRE, I WOULD INFINITELY RATHER
THAT THEY DESCEND THITHER BY
THE HAND OF THE EXECUTIONER
THAN DESERT AT THIS CRISIS THE
SACRED CAUSE OF MY COUNTRY

=== Dedication ===
The dedication ceremony occurred on May 20, 1909. Amongst the attendees were former Secretary of State John W. Foster, Presbyterians from around the country, foreign diplomats, and around 200 descendants of Witherspoon. The unveiling was done by descendant Williams Banks Withers, a seven-year old. Before the unveiling took place, the dedication ceremony occurred inside the Church of the Covenant. The invocation was given by another descendant, Dr. Jere Witherspoon, a reverend from Richmond. The benediction was then given by descendant Reverence David A. Wood of Gettysburg.

A speech was made by British Ambassador James Bryce, 1st Viscount Bryce, who lived in the British Embassy across the street. A fellow president of Princeton University and future U.S. president, Woodrow Wilson, then spoke about the life and contributions of Witherspoon. Vice President James S. Sherman then gave brief remarks followed by Commissioner MacFarland, secretary of the WMA, who presented the statue to Washingtonians.

== Later history ==
After the Church of the Covenant was razed in 1966, members of the church wanted the statue to be moved to its new location on Nebraska Avenue NW. Since the memorial is on federal land, church members were told it would require an Act of Congress to approve its relocation. The church formed the Commission on Relocation of the John Witherspoon Statue to urge Congress to approve the relocation. Despite years of lobbying, government officials told the church the memorial is at a prominent site where many people can see it, thus denying their request.

On July 14, 1978, a group of fourteen American Revolution Statuary, including the Witherspoon memorial, was listed on the National Register of Historic Places. The following year on March 3, 1979, the group of statues was added to the District of Columbia Inventory of Historic Sites. When the boundaries of the Dupont Circle Historic District were expanded on February 6, 1985, it included the memorial as being a contributing property to the historic district. On April 24, 1997, the memorial was listed as a contributing property to the L'Enfant Plan.

== See also ==
- List of public art in Washington, D.C., Ward 2
- National Register of Historic Places in Washington, D.C.
- Outdoor sculpture in Washington, D.C.
