= 1867 Ohio Attorney General election =

- October 8, 1867
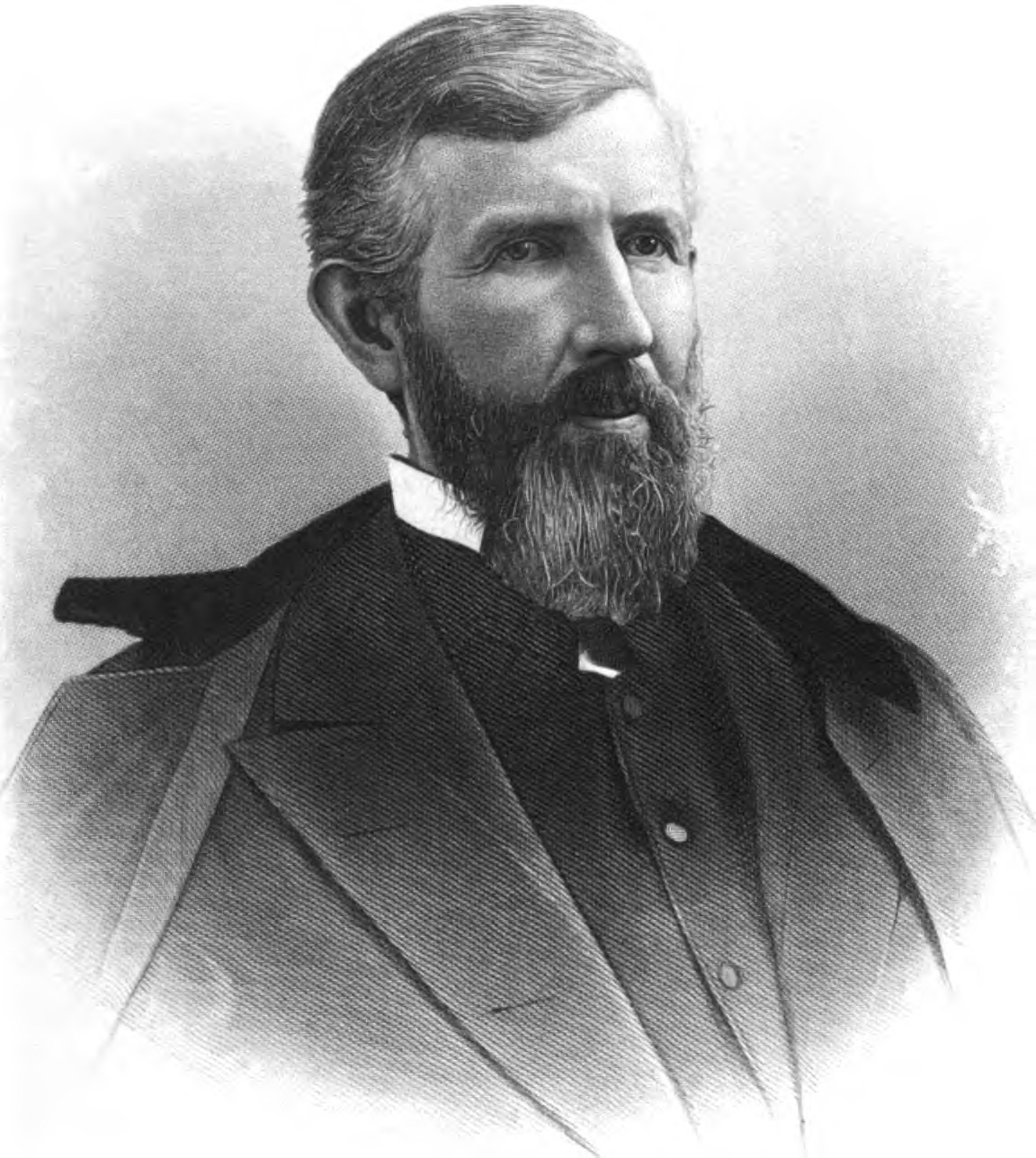

Nominee	William H. West	Frank H. Hurd
Party	Republican	Democratic
Popular vote	243,449	240,847
Percentage	50.27%	49.73%
Attorney General before election
William H. West
Republican
Elected Attorney General
William H. West
Republican

The 1867 Ohio Attorney General election was held on October 8, 1867, to elect the Ohio Attorney General. Republican incumbent William H. West won re-election, defeating Democratic Ohio state senator Frank H. Hurd by a narrow margin of just 2,602 votes.

== General election ==
=== Candidates ===
- William H. West, incumbent Ohio Attorney General (1866–1870) (Republican)
- Frank H. Hurd, Ohio state senator (1866–1868) (Democratic)

=== Results ===
1867 Ohio Attorney General election results
Party	Candidate	Votes	%	±%
Republican	William H. West	243,449	50.27%	−3.53%
Democratic	Frank H. Hurd	240,847	49.73%	+3.53%
Total votes		484,296	100.00%	
Republican hold				
