= 5th Ohio Independent Light Artillery Battery =

5th Ohio Battery
- Active: August 31, 1861, to July 31, 1865
- Country: United States
- Allegiance: Union
- Branch: Artillery
- Engagements: Battle of Shiloh; Siege of Corinth; Second Battle of Corinth; Siege of Vicksburg; Siege of Jackson

5th Ohio Battery was an artillery battery that served in the Union Army during the American Civil War.

== Service ==
The 5th Ohio Battery was organized in St. Louis, Missouri, on August 31, 1861, and mustered in there for three years service on September 22, 1861, under Captain Andrew Hickenlooper.

The battery was attached to Department of the Missouri until March 1862. Artillery, 6th Division, Army of the Tennessee, to July 1862. Artillery, 6th Division, District of Corinth, Mississippi, to November 1862. Artillery, 6th Division, Left Wing, XIII Corps, Department of the Tennessee, to December 1862. Artillery, 4th Division, XVII Corps, to January 1863. Artillery, 4th Division, XVI Corps, to July 1863. Artillery, 13th Division, XVI Corps, to August 1863. Artillery, 3rd Division, Arkansas Expedition, to November 1863. 3rd Brigade, 2nd Division, Army of Arkansas, to January 1864. 3rd Brigade, 2nd Division, VII Corps, Department of Arkansas, to May 1864. Artillery, 2nd Division, VII Corps, to October 1864. Artillery, 1st Division, VII Corps, to July 1865.

The 5th Ohio Battery mustered out of service on July 31, 1865, at Camp Dennison near Cincinnati, Ohio.

== Detailed service ==
Moved to Jefferson City, Mo., October 11, and duty there until March 7, 1862. Ordered to Pittsburg Landing, Tenn., March 7, 1862.

Battle of Shiloh, April 6–7.

Advance on and siege of Corinth, Miss., April 29-May 30. Duty at Corinth, Miss., until November. Battle of Corinth October 3–4.

Moved to Grand Junction November 2.

Grant's Central Mississippi Campaign. Operations on the Mississippi Central Railroad November 2, 1862, to January 10, 1863.

Moved to Moscow, Tenn., and duty there until March 8. Moved to Memphis, Tenn., and duty there until May.

Ordered to Vicksburg, Miss., May 17. Siege of Vicksburg, Miss., May 25-July 4.

Advance on Jackson, Miss., July 5–10. Siege of Jackson July 10–17. Assault on Jackson July 12. Ordered to Helena, Ark., July 25.

Steele's Expedition to Little Rock, Ark., August 3-September 10. Bayou Fourche and capture of Little Rock September 10. Duty at Little Rock as garrison artillery until July 1865.

Expedition from Little Rock to Little Red River August 6–16, 1864. Expedition from Little Rock in pursuit of Shelby August 27-September 6, 1864.

Non-veterans mustered out September 20, 1864. Veterans and recruits at Little Rock until July 1865.

== Casualties ==
The battery lost a total of 41 enlisted men during service; 5 enlisted men killed or mortally wounded, 36 enlisted men died of disease.

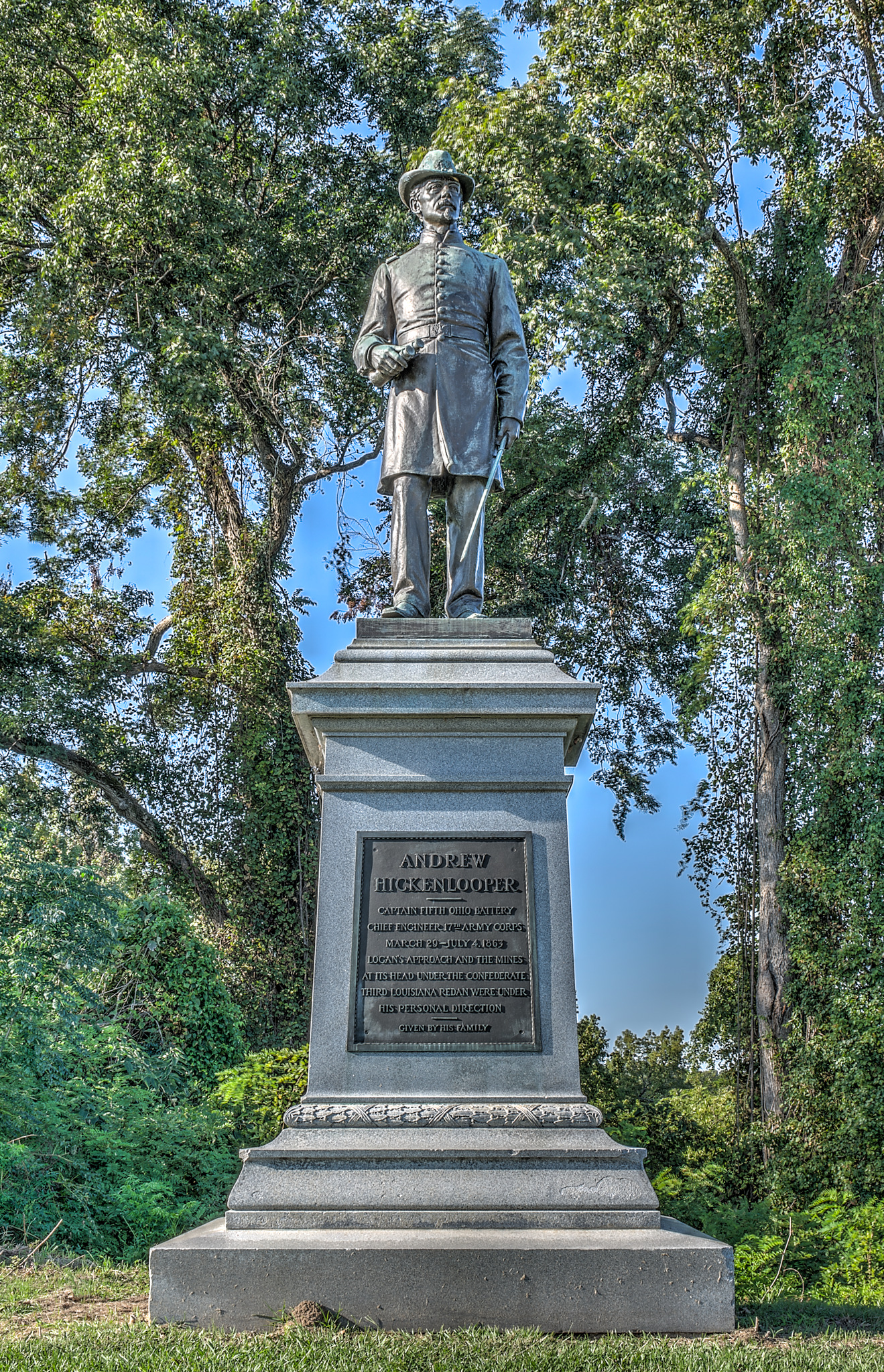
Statue of Capt. Andrew Hickenlooper by William Couper at Vicksburg National Military Park, 1912

== Commanders ==
- Captain Andrew Hickenlooper
- Captain Theophilus Kates

== See also ==
- List of Ohio Civil War units
- Ohio in the Civil War
