= Henry Adams Thompson =

American politician (1837–1920)

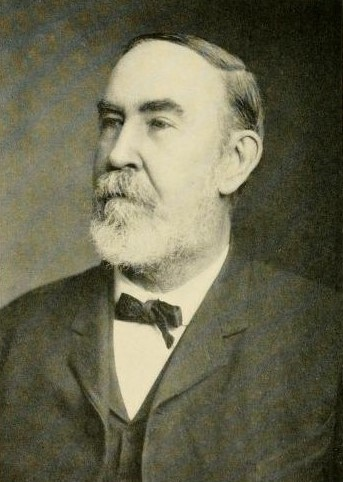

6th president of Otterbein University
- In office 1872–1886
- Preceded by: Daniel Eberly
- Succeeded by: Henry Garst

Personal details
- Born: March 23, 1837 Stormstown, Pennsylvania
- Died: July 8, 1920 (aged 83) Dayton, Ohio
- Education: Washington & Jefferson College (BA)

Henry Adams Thompson (March 23, 1837 – July 8, 1920) was an American prohibitionist and professor who was the vice-presidential nominee of the Prohibition Party in 1880.

Thompson was a native of Pennsylvania, but he spent much of his career in Ohio. He became a member of the United Brethren church and taught mathematics at several United Brethren colleges in the Midwest. Thompson served as president of Otterbein University from 1872 to 1886. Much of his time as college president was devoted to improving the financial standing of the school during the economic depression that followed the Panic of 1873.

Initially a Republican, he became an early member of the Prohibition Party. His attempt at election to the vice presidency in 1880, running on a ticket with Neal Dow of Maine, was the party's best showing to date, but they still placed a distant fourth to the eventual winners, James A. Garfield and Chester A. Arthur. He ran for office under the Prohibition banner several other times before and after 1880, all without success.

== Early life and educational career ==
Henry Thompson was born in Stormstown, Pennsylvania on March 23, 1837, the son of John Thompson and Lydia Blake Thompson. John Thompson was the manager of an ironworks in Centre County, and later owned a general mercantile business in Stormstown. Lydia Blake was a Quaker from Kennett Square, Pennsylvania, who was disinherited when she married Thompson, a Presbyterian. John Thompson was politically active and served two terms as county sheriff. He was active in anti-slavery and temperance causes, in both of which his son Henry followed him.

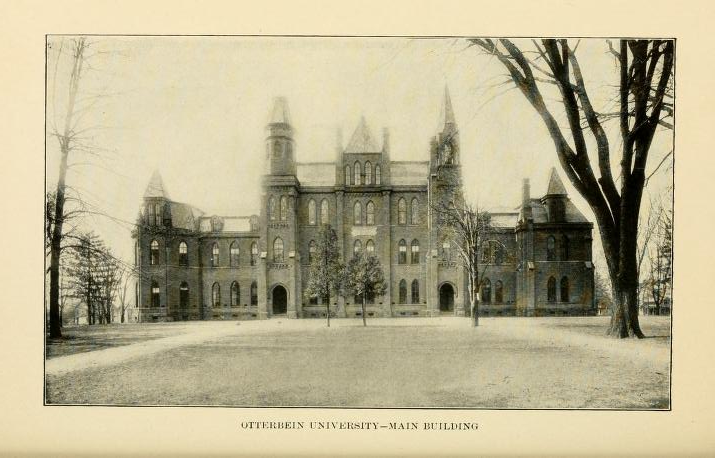
Otterbein University building as it appeared in Thompson's tenure

Thompson graduated from Jefferson College (now Washington & Jefferson College) in 1858 with a bachelor's degree, and studied for two years at the Western Theological seminary (now Pittsburgh Theological Seminary). In 1861, he was appointed professor of mathematics at Western College (now Leander Clark College), a United Brethren-affiliated college in Shueyville, Iowa, and taught there for one year. The United Brethren, a pietist church that arose first among Pennsylvania Germans during the Great Awakening, was one of the earliest churches in the United States to embrace abolitionism. By Thompson's time, they had also joined the fight for the prohibition of alcohol, though most did so from within the Republican Party and did not join the small single-issue Prohibition Party.

The next year, 1862, Thompson began teaching mathematics and natural science at another United Brethren school, Otterbein University in Westerville, Ohio. That same year, he married Harriet Copeland, an artist who also taught at Otterbein. They had three children: Jessie, Clara, and Louis; two of the three became medical doctors. In 1867, Thompson left Otterbein to become superintendent of schools in Troy, Ohio. After four years in that position, he returned to teaching, serving again as a mathematics professor in Westfield College, a United Brethren school in Westfield, Illinois. (Note: Westfield College no longer exists, having closed in 1914.)

In 1872, Thompson was elected president of Otterbein University, and remained in that position until 1886. He received a doctorate in divinity from Otterbein the following year. As president, Thompson continued to teach and delivered speeches around the country on school or church business. Thompson took office shortly before the financial Panic of 1873, with the result that his primary concern as president was keeping the college funded. In this he was successful, although the college had to borrow money to stay afloat until the economy recovered. After the initial debt was incurred, Thompson worked to raise donations to pay it off more quickly. He also worked to attract new professors to teach at Otterbein, improving both the quality of education and the school's reputation among scholars. Thompson was involved in organizing the General Board of Education of the United Brethren Church, which served as a coordinating body for the schools affiliated with the church.

== Political career ==
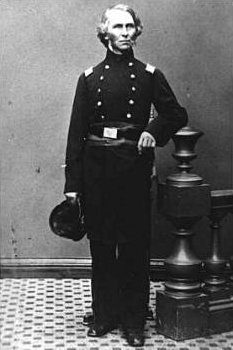
Neal Dow, Thompson's running mate in 1880

Thompson had identified with the Republican Party since its founding in the 1850s, but in 1874 he left it to join the new Prohibition Party. The Prohibitionists, more of a movement than a party, focused their efforts on banning alcohol. Like Thompson, most party members came from pietist churches, and most were former Republicans. He was the party's nominee for the federal House of Representatives from Ohio's 12th district at a special election held that year because of the resignation of Democrat Hugh J. Jewett, as well as for the full term that would follow. Thompson lost both, receiving only a few hundred votes and losing to Democratic candidate William E. Finck. He served as chairman of the Prohibition National Convention in 1876 in Cleveland, but the young party's nominees fared poorly, winning fewer than 7000 votes nationwide.

In 1880, the party nominated Thompson for vice president, joining a ticket headed by Neal Dow of Portland, Maine, the author of one of the nation's first municipal prohibition laws. Only twelve states sent delegates to the convention, and the platform they agreed on was silent on most issues of the day, focusing instead on the evils of alcohol. The Prohibitionists increased their vote total in the election that year, but still received just over 10,000 votes out of more than nine million cast. Thompson made another bid for elected office in 1887, when the Prohibition Party nominated him for Governor of Ohio. He was again unsuccessful, netting less than one percent of the vote and finishing in a distant fifth place behind the winner, Democrat Richard M. Bishop. Thompson's vote total was also surpassed by the Republican candidate, William H. West, and the candidates of two other minor parties, the Workingman Party and the Greenback Party.

Thompson ran for Congress several more times. In 1900, he ran in Ohio's 3rd congressional district as the nominee of the Union Reform Party, which was made up of Prohibition Party members who split from the main party. He received just 0.32% of the vote, and Republican Robert M. Nevin won the election. In 1908, he ran for the same seat for the re-united Prohibition Party, but won just 0.4% of the vote, losing the election to Democrat James M. Cox. In 1910, Thompson ran for governor of Ohio. Despite the growing popularity of the idea of prohibition, the Prohibition Party candidate got just 0.77% of the vote as Democrat Judson Harmon carried the state. His final attempt at election came in Indiana's 4th congressional district, just over the Ohio border. With 2.24% of the vote, it was Thompson's best performance, but he still fell far short of victory.

== Later life ==
After retiring as college president in 1886, Thompson remained active in school, party, and church affairs. He became a director of the Ohio State Archaeological and Historical Society in 1885 and prepared their exhibit at the World's Columbian Exposition in Chicago in 1893. He wrote several books on church topics, including Our Bishops: A Sketch of the Origin and Growth of the Church of the United Brethren in Christ, published in 1889. In 1901, he was elected editor of the United Brethren Review. He died in Dayton, Ohio on July 8, 1920, and was buried at Westerville, Ohio's Otterbein Cemetery.

== Sources ==
- "The Daily News Almanac and Book of Facts for 1902". Chicago, Illinois: The Chicago Daily News Co. 1902. hdl:2027/uc1.b3006938.
- "The Chicago Daily News Almanac and Year-Book for 1909". Chicago, Illinois: The Chicago Daily News Co. 1909. hdl:2027/mdp.39015026439714.
- "The Chicago Daily News Almanac and Year-Book for 1911". Chicago, Illinois: The Chicago Daily News Co. 1911. hdl:2027/uc1.b3006816.
- "The Chicago Daily News Almanac and Year-Book for 1913". Chicago, Illinois: The Chicago Daily News Co. 1913. hdl:2027/uc1.b3006818.
- "Our Victories: Ohio Leads the Column". Cincinnati Enquirer. October 16, 1874. p. 1.
- Clancy, Herbert J. (1958). The Presidential Election of 1880. Chicago, Illinois: Loyola University Press. ISBN 978-1-258-19190-0.
- Conover, Frank (1897). Centennial Portrait and Biographical Record of the City of Dayton and of Montgomery County, Ohio. Logansport, Indiana: A.W. Bowen & Co. OCLC 318388959.
- Curtin, Michael F.; Bell, Julia Barry (2006). Ohio Politics Almanac. Kent, Ohio: Kent State University Press. ISBN 0873388895.
- Garst, Henry (1907). Otterbein University, 1847–1907. Dayton, Ohio: United Brethren Publishing House. OCLC 541972.
- Kleppner, Paul (1979). The Third Electoral System, 1853–1892: Parties, Voters, and Political Cultures. Chapel Hill, North Carolina: University of North Carolina Press. ISBN 0-8078-1328-1.
- Leonard, John William; Marquis, Albert Nelson (1910). Who's Who in America. Vol. 6. Chicago, Illinois: A.N. Marquis & Co. OCLC 1141571.
- Linn, John Blair (1883). History of Centre and Clinton Counties. Philadelphia, Pennsylvania: Louis H. Evarts Co. ISBN 9785883574053. OCLC 1471713.
- Newman, Albert Henry (January 1898). "Reviewed Work: History of the Church of the United Brethren in Christ by Daniel Berger". The American Journal of Theology. 2 (1): 180–183. doi:10.1086/476779. JSTOR 3153199.
- Stewart, Joshua Thompson (1913). Indiana County, Pennsylvania: her people, past and present. Chicago, Illinois: J.H. Beers & Co. OCLC 1457357.
- Stroud, Rob (January 4, 2008). "Westfield native delves into history of college that powered town". Journal Gazette/Times-Courier. Mattoon, Illinois.
- Thompson, Henry Adams (1889). Our Bishops: A Sketch of the Origin and Growth of the Church of the United Brethren in Christ. Dayton, Ohio: United Brethren Publishing House. OCLC 2773231.
