= Jabez W. Fitch =

American politician

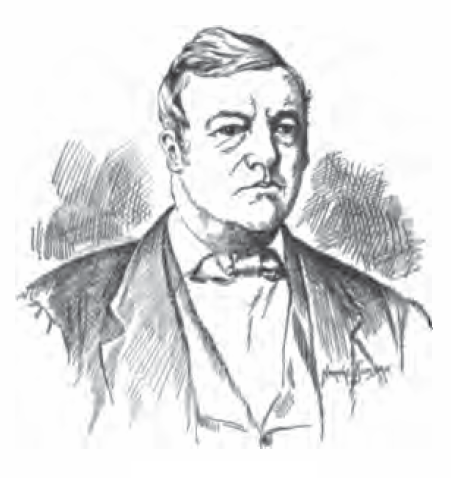

14th Lieutenant Governor of Ohio
- In office 1878–1880
- Governor: Richard M. Bishop
- Preceded by: H. W. Curtiss
- Succeeded by: Andrew Hickenlooper

Personal details
- Born: May 1823
- Died: April 5, 1884 (aged 60) Cleveland, Ohio, U.S.
- Party: Democratic
- Spouse: Mary J. Doleman
- Occupation: Lawyer, politician

Military service
- Allegiance: United States (Union)
- Branch/service: Union Army
- Rank: General
- Unit: 19th Ohio Infantry

Jabez Warner Fitch (May 1823 – April 5, 1884) was an American politician who served as the 14th lieutenant governor of Ohio from 1878 to 1880 under Governor Richard M. Bishop. He was a Democrat from Cuyahoga County.

== Biography ==
Jabez Fitch was born in 1823, and moved to Cuyahoga County, Ohio in 1826. His father was Guerdon Fitch, a well known citizen. He attended common schools, and entered the Cleveland law offices of Bolton & Kelly, where he worked and studied law. He was married to Mary J. Doleman.

== Career ==
In 1846, he was admitted to the bar, and was appointed city solicitor. When Franklin Pierce was elected, Fitch was appointed United States Marshall for the Northern District of Ohio. He was city councilman in 1851 He was a longtime member of the volunteer fire department, and was elected chief in 1852. During the United States Civil War, Fitch was general of volunteers, in charge of Camp Taylor in Cleveland. Regiments were sent out under other commanders, so Fitch volunteered as private in the 19th Ohio Infantry under General Beatty, who appointed him quartermaster. After the war, he returned to real estate interests in Cleveland, and, in 1877 he was elected lieutenant governor of Ohio on a Democratic Party ticket with Richard M. Bishop. He held no later offices, except trustee of the Northern Ohio Insane Asylum and United States jury commissioner.

== Death ==
Jabez W. Fitch died in Cleveland on April 5, 1884, ten years after his wife. He left no children.

Political offices
Preceded by H. W. Curtiss	Lieutenant Governor of Ohio; 1878-1880	Succeeded by Andrew Hickenlooper
Party political offices
Preceded by Samuel Fenton Cary	Democratic Party nominee for Lieutenant Governor of Ohio; 1877	Succeeded by Americus V. Rice
