= Nicholas W. Thomas =

American politician

Mayor of Cincinnati
- In office 1857–1859
- Preceded by: James J. Faran
- Succeeded by: Richard M. Bishop

Personal details
- Born: May 23, 1810; Jenkintown, Pennsylvania, U.S.
- Died: March 27, 1864 (aged 53); Cincinnati, Ohio, U.S.
- Political party: Whig
- Spouse: Arminda Barnard
- Children: 4 children
- Parent(s): Joseph and Eleanor Thomas

Nicholas W. Thomas (May 23, 1810 – March 27, 1864) was the Mayor of Cincinnati, Ohio, from 1857 to 1859.

He was born in Jenkintown (now part of Philadelphia), Philadelphia County, Pa., on May 23, 1810. He was the son of Joseph and Eleanor Thomas. He married Arminda Barnard; together they had four children.

He was a member of the Whig Party (United States).

Mayor Thomas died March 27, 1864. His interment was at Spring Grove Cemetery, in Cincinnati, Ohio.
