= Richard M. Bishop =

American politician

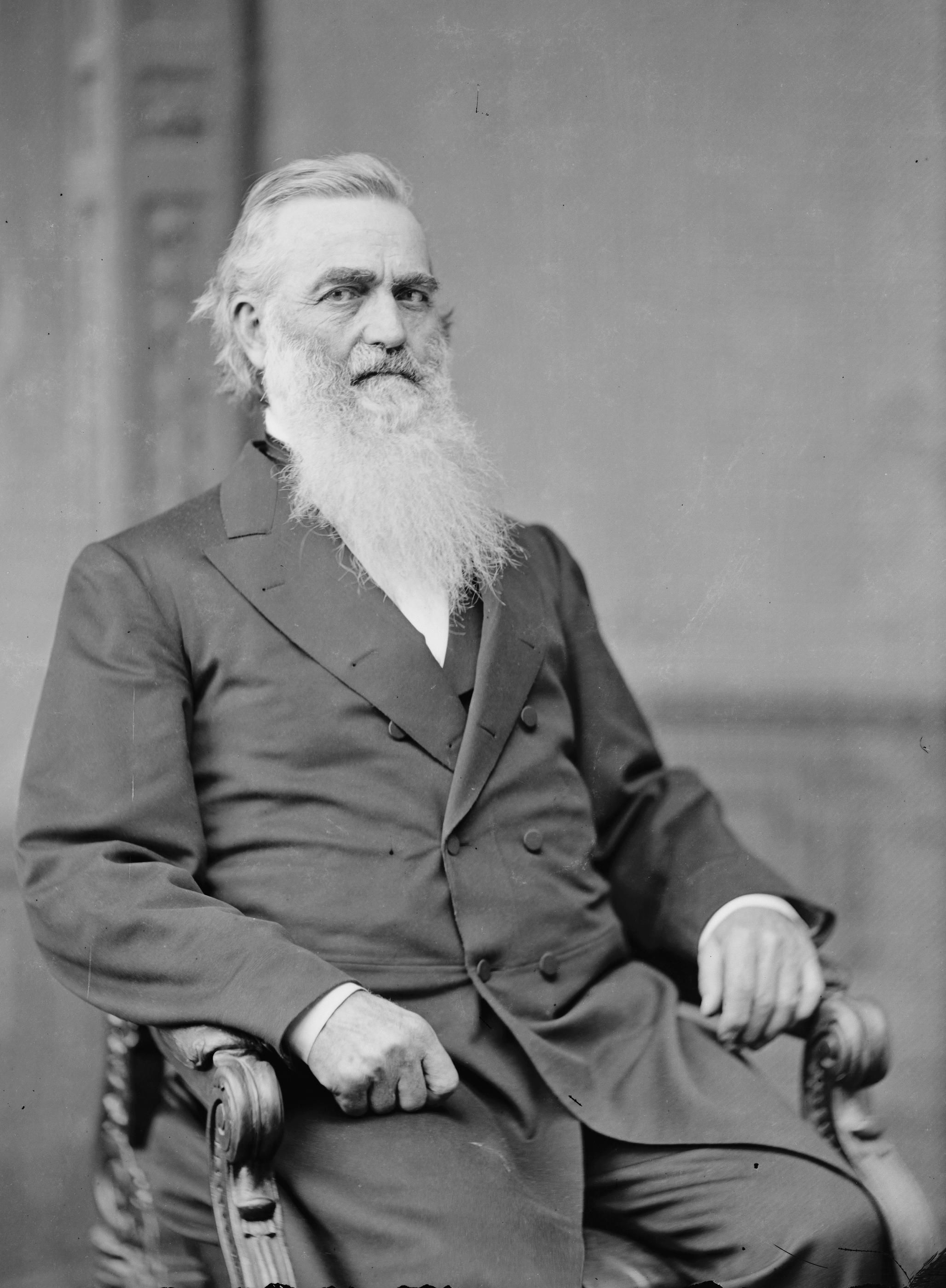
- Bishop c. 1865-1880

34th Governor of Ohio
- In office January 14, 1878 – January 12, 1880
- Lieutenant: Jabez W. Fitch
- Preceded by: Thomas L. Young
- Succeeded by: Charles Foster

Personal details
- Born: November 4, 1812 Fleming County, Kentucky, U.S.
- Died: March 2, 1893 (aged 80) Jacksonville, Florida, U.S.
- Resting place: Spring Grove Cemetery
- Party: Democratic

Richard Bishop (November 4, 1812 – March 2, 1893), also known as Richard M. Bishop and Papa Richard, was an American politician from the U.S. state of Ohio. Bishop served as the 34th governor of Ohio.

== Biography ==
Richard Moore Bishop was born in Fleming County, Kentucky, and received business training in his home state. He came to Cincinnati, Ohio in 1848, and had a wholesale grocery business on the Public Landing as Bishop and Wells and later R. M. Bishop and Company. In 1857 he became councilman, and 1858, president of the Council. He was Mayor from 1859 to 1861, and declined re-nomination.

While Bishop was mayor, the Prince of Wales accepted his invitation to visit the city, and, despite being a Democrat, Bishop made the address of welcome to President Lincoln as he passed through on the way to his inauguration. He presided over the great Union meeting held the first year of the war.

From 1859 to 1869, Bishop was President of the Ohio Missionary State Society, and he also served as President of the General Christian Missionary Convention. He was also a member of the Ohio Constitutional Convention of 1873. He was a mover in promoting the Cincinnati Southern Railway.

In 1877, the Democrats nominated Bishop for governor, and he defeated Republican William H. West and three other candidates with a plurality, but not majority of the votes. Bishop served a single two-year term as governor, and was not re-nominated by his party. A Democratic writer summed up his administration thus:

Governor Bishop was a conscientious man and had made a good Governor, but he was not a politician and made no attempt to keep in touch with or control the leaders of the state. He made political appointments without consulting party leaders and his selections were the cause of much trouble between the Governor and some strong men who helped to elect him. In addition to these things his son exercised altogether too much influence in the State House for the good of his father's administration. His name is associated in an unenviable way with pardons to convicts, it being alleged that he influenced the Governor to grant pardons for reasons which were not always either just or humanitarian.

— Thomas Edward Powell, 1913

Bishop died at Jacksonville, Florida, March 2, 1893.

Bishop was buried at Spring Grove Cemetery.

== Notes ==
Political offices
Preceded by Nicholas W. Thomas	Mayor of Cincinnati, Ohio; 1859–1861	Succeeded by George Hatch
Preceded by Thomas L. Young	Governor of Ohio; 1878–1880	Succeeded by Charles Foster
Party political offices
Preceded by William Allen	Democratic nominee for Governor of Ohio; 1877	Succeeded by Thomas Ewing, Jr.
