= Thomas L. Young =

33rd Governor of Ohio

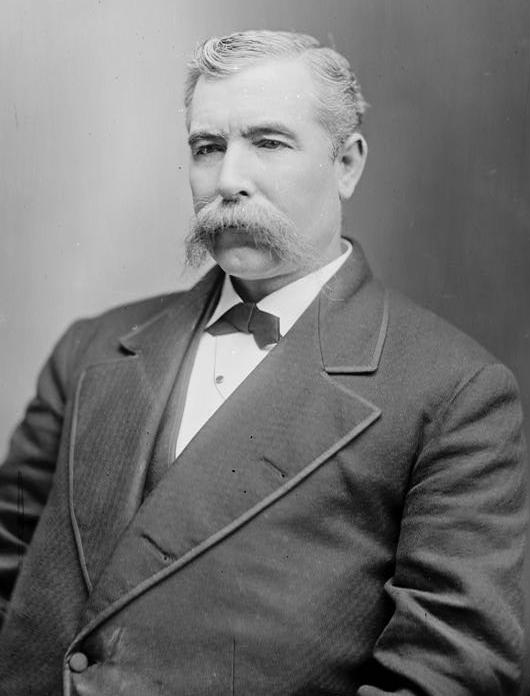
- Young, 1865–1880

33rd Governor of Ohio
- In office March 2, 1877 – January 14, 1878
- Lieutenant: H. W. Curtiss
- Preceded by: Rutherford B. Hayes
- Succeeded by: Richard M. Bishop

12th Lieutenant Governor of Ohio
- In office January 10, 1876 – March 2, 1877
- Governor: Rutherford B. Hayes
- Preceded by: Alphonso Hart
- Succeeded by: H. W. Curtiss

Member of the U.S. House of Representatives from Ohio's 2nd district
- In office March 4, 1879 – March 3, 1883
- Preceded by: Henry B. Banning
- Succeeded by: Isaac M. Jordan

Member of the Ohio House of Representatives from the Hamilton County district
- In office January 1, 1866 – January 5, 1868 Serving with ten others
- Preceded by: ten others
- Succeeded by: nine others

Member of the Ohio Senate from the first district
- In office January 1, 1872 – January 4, 1874 Serving with John Schiff; Joseph F. Wright
- Preceded by: Thomas H. Yeatman; Michael Goepper; Samuel Furman Hunt; Nathan Lord, Jr.
- Succeeded by: William R. Wallace; Vachel Worthington; Stephen H. Burton

Personal details
- Born: Thomas Lowry Young; December 14, 1832 Killyleagh, County Down, Ireland
- Died: July 20, 1888 (aged 55) Cincinnati, Ohio, U.S.
- Resting place: Spring Grove Cemetery, Cincinnati, Ohio
- Party: Republican
- Education: Cincinnati Law School

Military service
- Allegiance: United States
- Branch/service: United States Army; Union Army
- Years of service: 1848 – 1858, 1861 – 1864
- Rank: Colonel; Brevet Brigadier General
- Commands: 118th Ohio Infantry

Thomas Lowry Young (December 14, 1832 – July 20, 1888) was an American politician from the U.S. state of Ohio. Young, a Republican, served as the 33rd governor of Ohio from March 2, 1877, to January 14, 1878.

== Early life ==
Young was born in Killyleagh, County Down, in Ulster, a northern province of Ireland. At that time, all of Ireland was part of the United Kingdom of Great Britain and Ireland. While living in Ireland, his father was a gardener for The 2nd Baron Dufferin and Claneboye. He immigrated with his parents to the United States as a child and spent his childhood in New York.

He worked for a Democratic Party newspaper in Sidney, Ohio in 1862 between military service, and afterward, and spoke out against the Lincoln Administration, believing them to be too soft in the war effort thus far. After military service, he returned to Cincinnati and graduated from the Cincinnati Law School in 1865.

== Military service ==
Young enlisted in the U.S. Army in 1848, originally joining as a musician. He advanced through the ranks of the artillery to become a First Sergeant in the 3rd U.S. Artillery, serving under Brevet Major John F. Reynolds. After his service ended in January 1858, Young moved to Pennsylvania, then to Cincinnati a year later, where he served as the Assistant Superintendent for the House of Refuge Reform School for Youth.

In March 1861 Young, believing a civil war to be imminent, wrote to General Winfield Scott volunteering his services. He officially joined the American Civil War effort a month later. Between August and December, he served under John C. Frémont as a captain while stationed in Missouri. The unit disbanded at the beginning of 1862, and Young left the service.

Young re-enlisted and received a commission as major in the 118th Ohio Infantry in September 1862, where he remained for the duration of his service. He was promoted to the rank of lieutenant colonel in February 1863 and the rank of colonel in April 1864. At the Battle of Resaca in May, Young led a charge against the enemy that was quickly defeated; the charge caused him to lose 116 of his 270 men in the span of a few minutes. He contracted an illness during the Atlanta campaign and resigned from the Army in September. President Abraham Lincoln brevetted him Brigadier-General of volunteers for his service on March 13, 1865.

== Career ==
Shortly afterward, he began his political career with an appointment as Assistant City Auditor, a position he held for the rest of the year. He was elected to the Ohio House of Representatives afterward and served a single two-year term from 1866 to 1868. Young became Hamilton County Recorder in October 1867, and held the position until President Andrew Johnson named him Internal Revenue Supervisor of Southern Ohio in late 1868, a position he held through 1869.

After resigning from that position, Young worked in real estate until 1871 when he was elected to the Ohio State Senate. At that point he was considered highly regarded in the Republican Party, and when elected to the State Senate, he had more votes than most other Republicans on the statewide ballot.

Young was elected the 12th lieutenant governor of Ohio in 1875, defeating Samuel Cary, taking office in 1876. He then filled out the term of Rutherford B. Hayes when the latter was elected to the presidency, serving from 1877 to 1878.

Young was then elected to the United States House of Representatives in 1878 and served two terms before losing a battle for renomination in 1882.

== Personal life ==
He died in 1888 while holding a position on the Cincinnati Board of Public Affairs. Young was buried in Spring Grove Cemetery in Cincinnati.

== See also ==
- List of American Civil War generals
- List of United States governors born outside the United States

== Notes ==
Political offices
Preceded by Alphonso Hart	Lieutenant Governor of Ohio; 1876–1877	Succeeded by H. W. Curtiss
Preceded by Rutherford B. Hayes	Governor of Ohio; 1877–1878	Succeeded by Richard M. Bishop
U.S. House of Representatives
Preceded by Henry B. Banning	Member of the U.S. House of Representatives from Ohio's 2nd congressional district March 4, 1879 – March 3, 1883	Succeeded by Isaac M. Jordan
