= Statue of Joseph Bryan =

Statue formerly in Richmond, Virginia, U.S.

Coordinates: 37°32′50.8″N 77°27′0.6″W

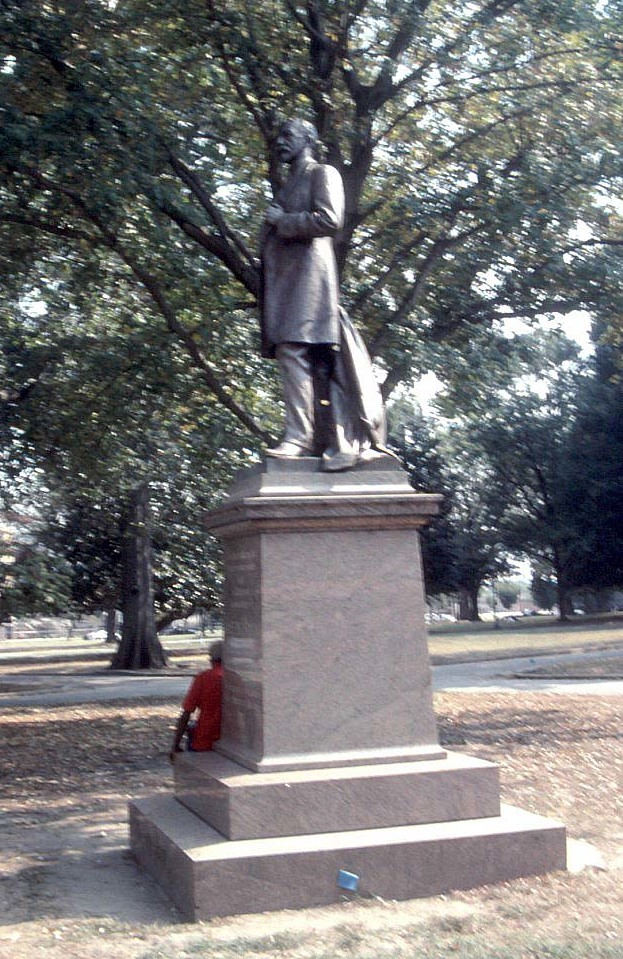
- Artist: William Couper
- Year: 1911; 115 years ago
- Type: Statue
- Subject: Joseph Bryan
- Location: Richmond, Virginia, United States

A statue of Joseph Bryan was installed in Richmond, Virginia's Monroe Park, in the United States. The statue depicts Joseph Bryan, a publisher and industrialist who owned the Richmond Times-Dispatch. Bryan formerly served in the Confederate Army and actively promoted the Lost Cause myth. The memorial was removed in July 2020.

== See also ==
- List of monuments and memorials removed during the George Floyd protests
