= William Couper (sculptor) =

American sculptor (1853–1942)

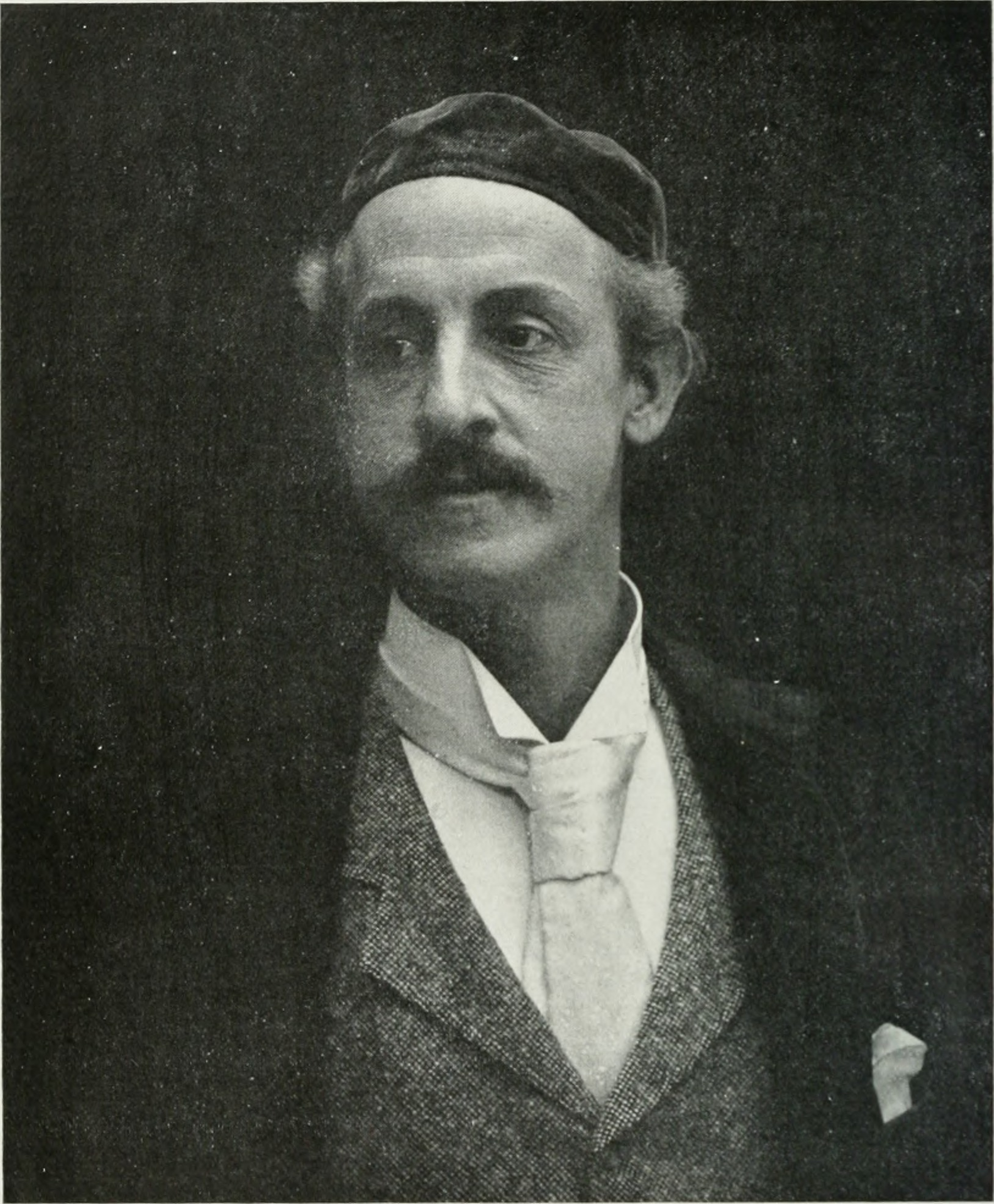
- Born: September 20, 1853; Norfolk, Virginia, U.S.
- Died: June 23, 1942 (aged 88); Easton, Maryland, U.S.
- Known for: Sculpture
- Spouse: Eliza Chickering Ball (m. 1878; died 1939)

William L. Couper (September 20, 1853 – June 23, 1942) was an American sculptor.

== Early life and education ==
Couper was born on September 20, 1853 in Norfolk, Virginia. He studied in Munich and Florence, and remained in the latter city for 22 years.

== Career ==
He then returned to the United States and establishing himself in New York in 1897 as a portraitist and sculptor of busts in the modern Italian manner. He and Thomas Ball purchased a three-story brick building on 17th Street in Manhattan to serve as shared studio space.

He sculpted the figure of the Roman goddess Flora for the exhibit of the Apollinaris Company at the Chicago World's Fair in 1893. At the Pan-American Exposition in Buffalo in 1901 his work won a bronze medal.

Couper retired from sculpting in 1913.

Couper is well known for his winged figures, such as the Recording Angel at the Couper family plot in Elmwood Cemetery in Norfolk and allegorical figures, such as Psyche and Crown for the Victor, in the collection of the Montclair Art Museum.

Couper lived much of his life in Montclair, New Jersey, where he built a large neoclassical villa he named Poggioridente or "laughing knoll".

== Personal life ==
He married Eliza Chickering Ball, daughter of sculptor Thomas Ball (1819–1911), in Florence in 1878. He was also a colleague of Daniel Chester French.

He had a home in Cortland, New York, as well. His wife died in 1939. They had several sons, one of whom, Thomas Ball Couper, lived in Montclair. His son Richard Hamilton Couper, a landscape painter, died in 1918 at the age of 33.

== Death ==
He spent his last year at his other son William's farm in Bozman, Maryland, and died in an Easton, Maryland hospital after a brief illness on June 23, 1942.

== Works ==
- Crown for the Victor (Beauty’s Wreath for Valor’s Brow) (1896), Montclair Art Museum, Montclair, NJ
- Confederate Monument in downtown Norfolk, Virginia (1906)
- Statue of John Witherspoon, Washington, D.C. (1909)
- Bronze statue of Hunter Holmes McGuire at the Virginia State Capitol, Richmond, Virginia
- Statue of Captain John Smith overlooking the James River at Jamestown, Virginia
- Statue of John A. Roebling in City Park, Trenton, New Jersey
- Statue of Abram Hewitt, New York City mayor
- Statue of Morris K. Jesup, president of the American Museum of Natural History, New York, NY (1910)
- Bronze bust of Charles Darwin, created in New York in 1909 and presented to the American Museum of Natural History. A replica of this work was also presented to Christ's College, Cambridge where Darwin had been an undergraduate.
- Statue of Joseph Bryan, Monroe Park, Richmond, Virginia (1910)
- Marble sphinxes at the Stanford Family Mausoleum at Stanford University, Palo Alto, California (1908)
- Statue of Henry Wadsworth Longfellow in Washington, D.C. (1909)
- Bust of John D. Rockefeller
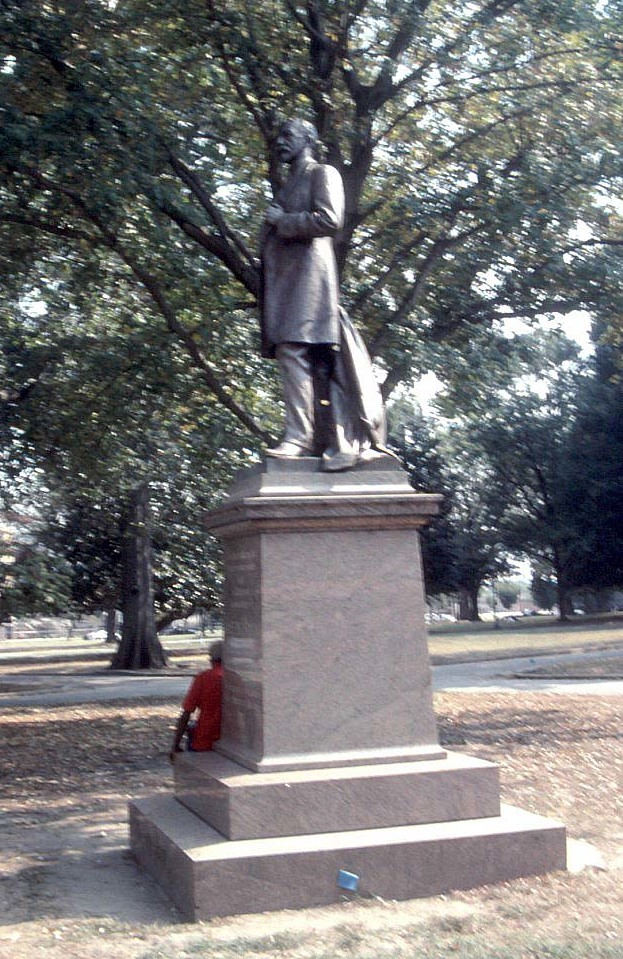
Joseph Bryan

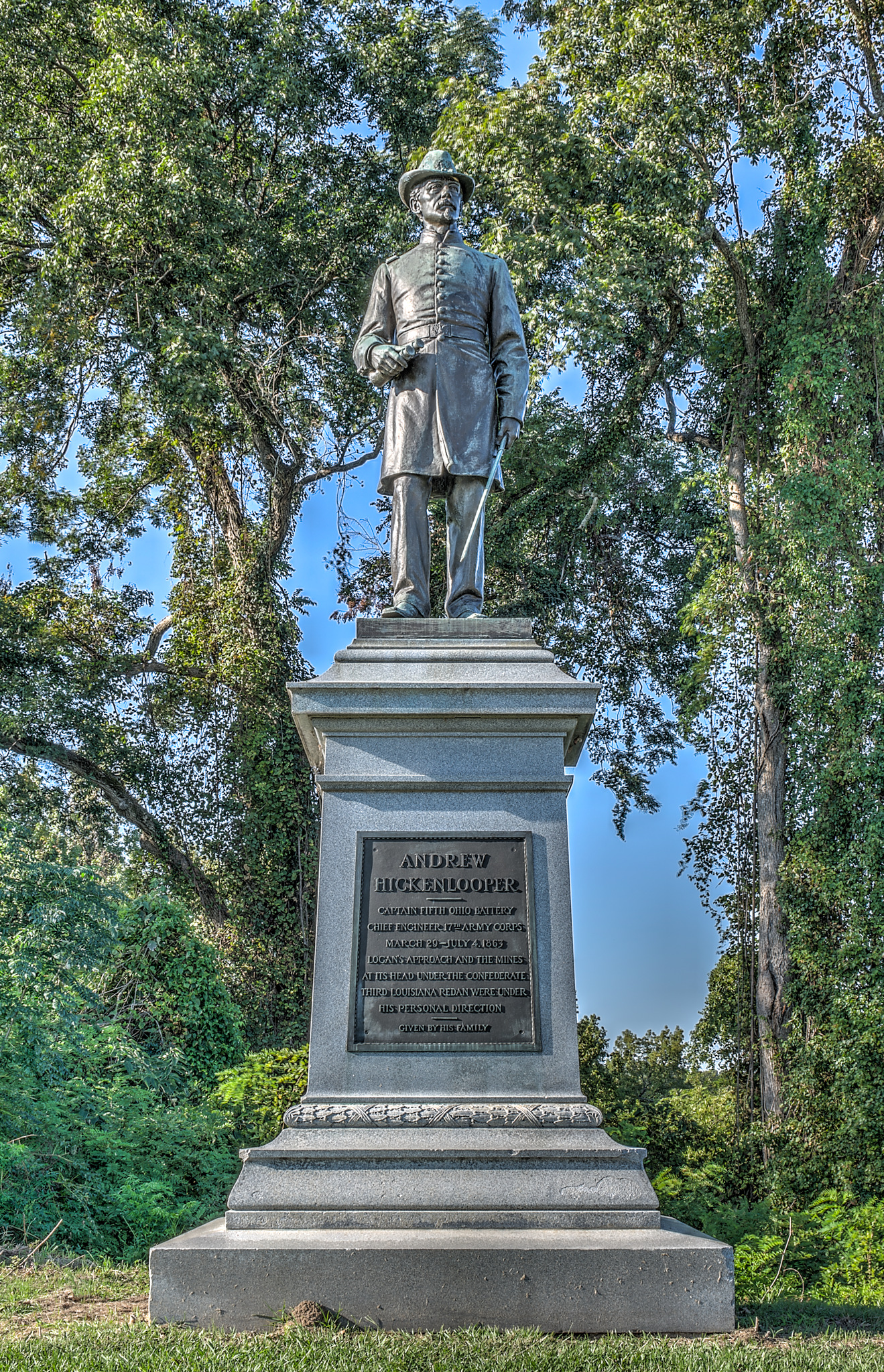
Statue of Andrew Hickenlooper, Vicksburg National Military Park (1912)

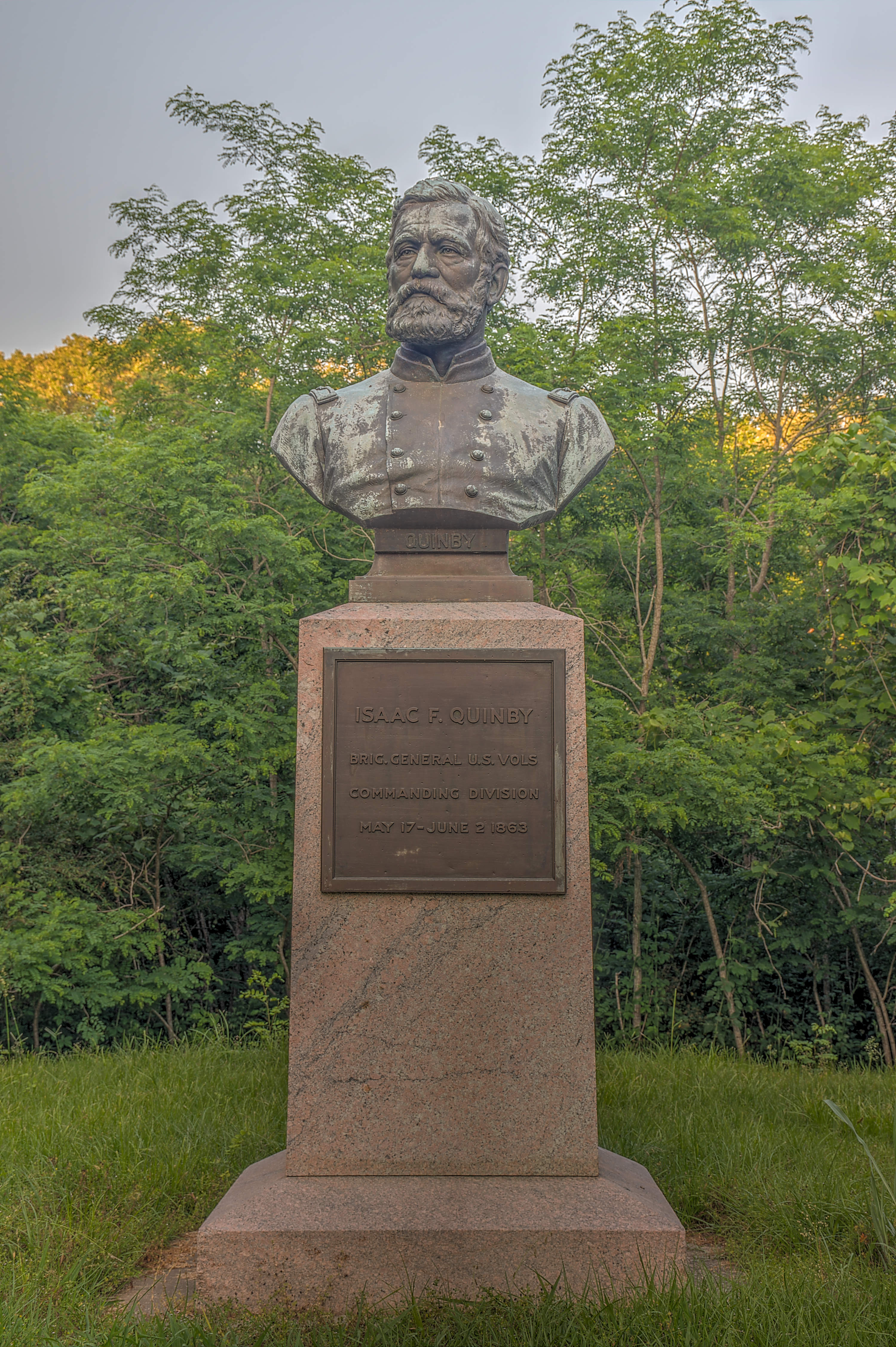
Bust of Isaac F. Quniby, Vicksburg National Military Park (1911)

== Sources ==
- Couper, Greta Elena, An American Sculptor on the Grand Tour: The Life and Works of William Couper (1853–1942), TreCavalli Press, 1988, ISBN 9780962063541
