= Andrew Hickenlooper =

American military officer and politician (1837–1904)

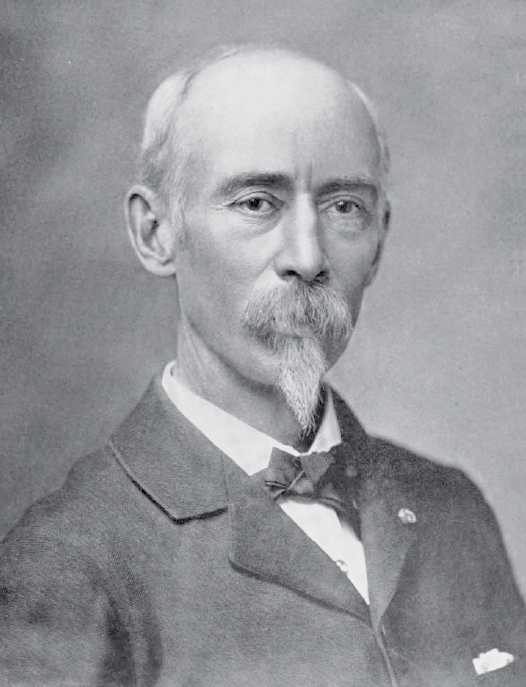
- Hickenlooper in 1898

15th Lieutenant Governor of Ohio
- In office January 12, 1880 – January 9, 1882
- Governor: Charles Foster
- Preceded by: Jabez W. Fitch
- Succeeded by: Rees G. Richards

Personal details
- Born: August 10, 1837 Hudson, Ohio, U.S.
- Died: May 12, 1904 (aged 66) Cincinnati, Ohio, U.S.
- Resting place: Spring Grove Cemetery, Cincinnati
- Party: Republican
- Spouse: Maria Lloyd Smith Hickenlooper
- Children: 2, including Smith
- Relatives: John Hickenlooper (great-grandson); George Hickenlooper (first cousin twice removed)

Military service
- Allegiance: United States
- Branch/service: United States Army
- Years of service: 1862–1865
- Rank: Brigadier General
- Commands: 5th Ohio Independent Battery; Chief of Staff, XVIII Corps
- Battles/wars: American Civil War; Battle of Shiloh; Vicksburg Campaign; Atlanta campaign; Sherman's March to the Sea

Andrew Hickenlooper (August 10, 1837 – May 12, 1904) was an Ohioan civil engineer, politician, industrialist, and a Union Army lieutenant colonel of artillery and engineers. In recognition of his service, in 1866, he was nominated and confirmed for appointment as a brevet brigadier general of volunteers to rank from March 13, 1865.

== Early life ==
Hickenlooper was born in the village of Hudson, Ohio, the son of Abigail (Cox) and Andrew Hickenlooper. He attended Woodward College and Xavier College. When he was nineteen, he entered the office of A. W. Gilbert, then the city surveyor of Cincinnati, and thoroughly mastered the duties of the position. Three years later, he became the city surveyor himself. After spending two years in this position, the Civil War broke out.

== Military career ==
Although he was only twenty-four, he recruited what was known as Hickenlooper's Battery or the 5th Ohio Independent Battery, and joined Maj. Gen. John C. Fremont at Jefferson City, Missouri. In 1862, his battery was made a part of the Army of the Tennessee and took a distinguished part in the Battle of Shiloh. Hickenlooper managed to save four of his six guns after the initial Confederate attack. He later defended the famous Hornet's Nest in support of Benjamin M. Prentiss's division. For gallantry at Shiloh, he became commandant of artillery in Thomas J. McKean's division and later chief of staff of the XVII Corps.

During the Vicksburg Campaign, Brig. Gen. James McPherson wrote to Secretary of War Edwin Stanton that, as Hickenlooper's further promotion in the line of the artillery service was impossible, that he be given special consideration for promotion. Hickenlooper served through the Atlanta campaign as an engineer with distinguished honor and participated in Sherman's March to the Sea, and the advance through the Carolinas. He was endorsed for brigadier general by Generals William Sherman, Oliver O. Howard, and Ulysses S. Grant. On January 13, 1866 President Andrew Johnson nominated Hickenlooper for appointment to the grade of brevet brigadier general of volunteers, to rank from March 13, 1865, and the United States Senate confirmed the appointment on March 12, 1866.

== Career ==
After the war, Hickenlooper was appointed United States marshal for the Southern district of Ohio. Then he served two terms as city civil engineer. While in this office, he was made assistant to W.W. Scarborough, then the president of the Cincinnati Gas Company, with the title of vice president. He served as vice president but for a short time, as he was then elected president of the company. He published two books, Competition in the Manufacture and Delivery of Gas (1881), and Incandescent Electric Lights for Street Illumination (1886). He became active in veterans affairs, particularly those of the Society of the Army of the Tennessee, serving as its Corresponding Secretary, where he worked tirelessly for the erection of monuments to the memory of his friend and mentor, General James B. McPherson

== Political career ==
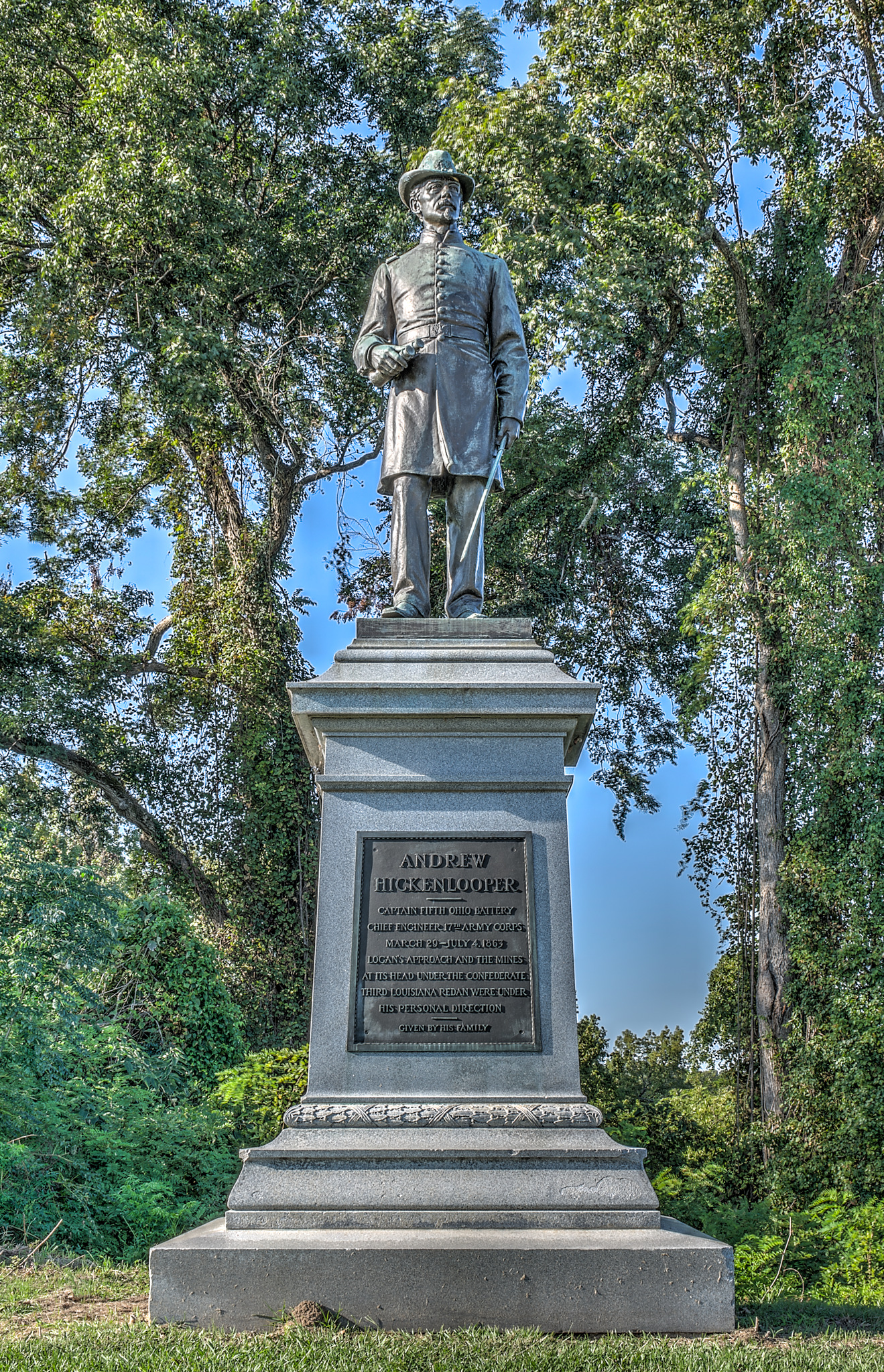
Statue by William Couper at Vicksburg National Military Park, 1912

In 1879, he was elected the 15th lieutenant governor of Ohio under Governor Charles Foster and declined a renomination in 1881. He served one term as president of the Cincinnati Chamber of Commerce. In 1902, he published a book on the Battle of Shiloh.

== Personal life ==
He was married to Maria Lloyd Smith and had two children.

== Death and legacy ==
Hickenlooper died in Cincinnati with a distinguished civil and military reputation. He is buried in Spring Grove Cemetery, Cincinnati. On January 3, 1912, a statue in honor of Hickenlooper was erected in Vicksburg National Military Park.

His descendants include son Smith Hickenlooper, a Federal Judge of the United States Court of Appeals for the Sixth Circuit, and great-grandson John Hickenlooper, former Governor of Colorado and current U.S. senator.

He was also related to pianist Olga Samaroff (née Lucy Mary Olga Agnes Hickenlooper).

== See also ==
- List of American Civil War brevet generals (Union)

== Bibliography ==
- Ballard, Michael B., Vicksburg, The Campaign that Opened the Mississippi, University of North Carolina Press, 2004, ISBN 0-8078-2893-9.
- Daniel, Larry, Shiloh: The Battle that Changed the Civil War, Simon and Schuster, 1997, ISBN 0-684-83857-5.
- Eicher, John H., and Eicher, David J., Civil War High Commands, Stanford University Press, 2001, ISBN 0-8047-3641-3.
- Sword, Wiley, Shiloh: Bloody April, Morningside Books, 1974, ISBN 0-89029-770-3.
- Reid, Whitelaw (1895). "Andrew Hickenlooper". Ohio in the War Her Statesmen Generals and Soldiers. Vol. 1. Cincinnati: The Robert Clarke Company. pp. 937–939.

Preceded by Jabez W. Fitch	Lieutenant Governor of Ohio; 1880–1882	Succeeded by Rees G. Richards
Preceded by Edwin Stevens	President of Cincinnati Chamber of Commerce; 1886–1887	Succeeded by Levi C. Goodale
