= William H. West (judge) =

American judge (1824–1911)

William Henry West
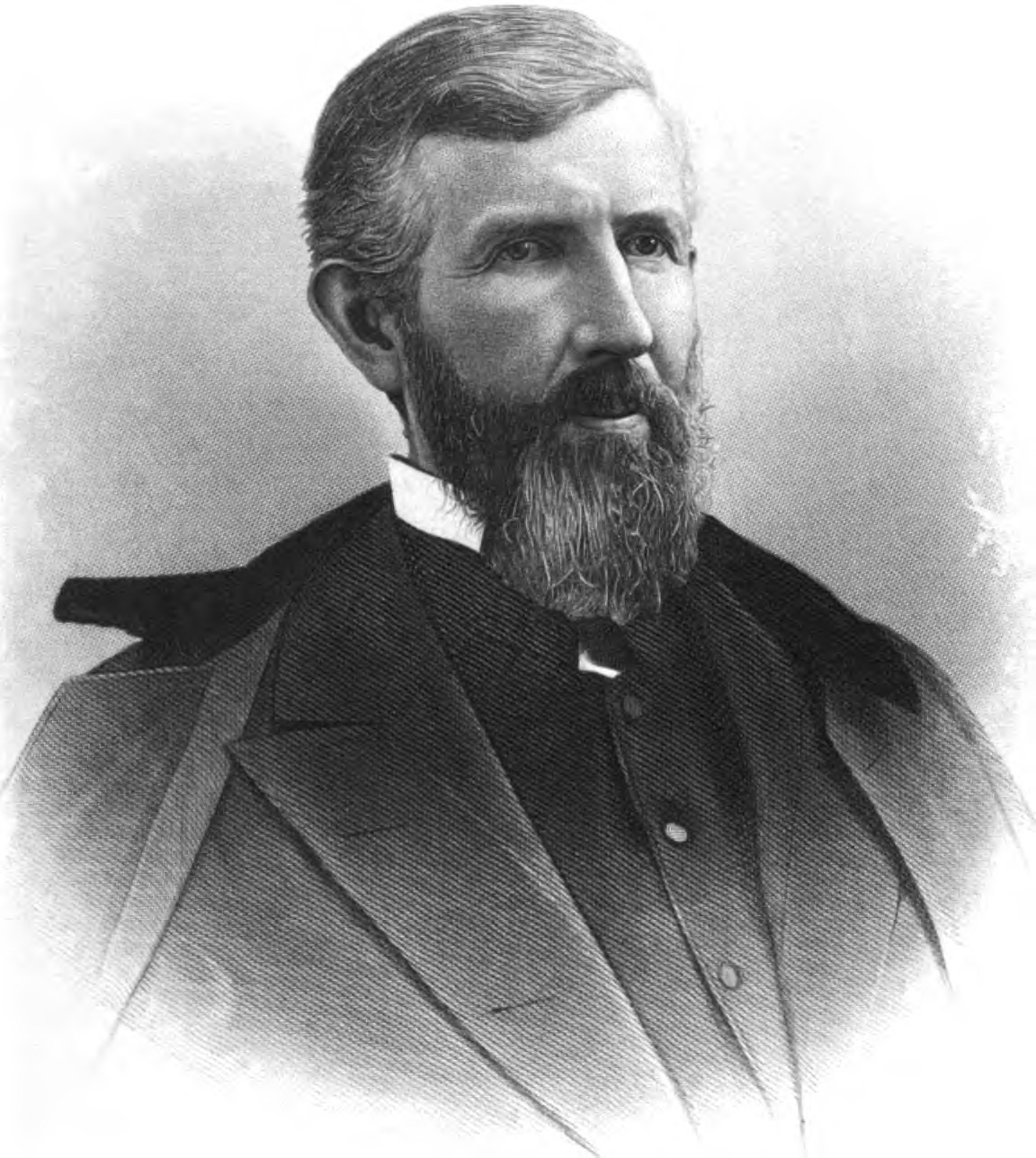

11th Ohio Attorney General
- In office January 8, 1866 – January 10, 1870
- Governor: Jacob D. Cox; Rutherford B. Hayes
- Preceded by: Chauncey N. Olds
- Succeeded by: Francis Bates Pond

Justice of the Ohio Supreme Court
- In office February 9, 1872 – February 25, 1873
- Preceded by: Josiah Scott
- Succeeded by: Walter F. Stone

Member of the Ohio House of Representatives from the Logan County district
- In office January 4, 1858 – January 1, 1860
- Preceded by: Samuel M. Allen
- Succeeded by: James W. Hamilton
- In office January 6, 1862 – January 3, 1864
- Preceded by: James W. Hamilton
- Succeeded by: Charles W. B. Allison

Member of the Ohio Senate from the 13th district
- In office January 4, 1864 – December 31, 1865
- Preceded by: John Hood
- Succeeded by: P. B. Cole

Personal details
- Born: February 9, 1824 Washington County, Pennsylvania, US
- Died: March 14, 1911 (aged 87) Bellefontaine, Ohio, US
- Resting place: Bellefontaine City Cemetery
- Party: Republican
- Spouse(s): Elizabeth Williams; Clara Riddle Gorton
- Children: four
- Education: Jefferson College
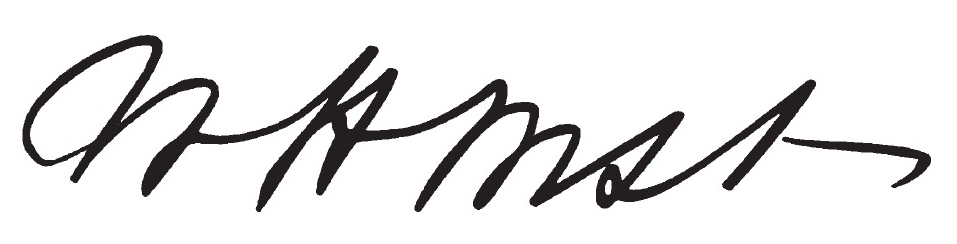
- Signature

William Henry West (February 9, 1824 – March 14, 1911) was a Republican Party politician in the U.S. state of Ohio who served as Ohio Attorney General from 1866 to 1868, and a member of the Ohio Supreme Court from February 1872 to 1873. His failing eyesight and powerful oration led to the title Blind Man Eloquent.

== Biography ==
William H. West was born in Millsborough, Washington County, Pennsylvania. He was born on the anniversary of William Henry Harrison's birthday, and was named in his honor. In 1830, his parents settled on a farm in Knox County, Ohio, near Mount Vernon. In 1840 he entered the Martinsburg, Ohio Academy. He taught and studied until entering Jefferson College in Pennsylvania in 1844. He graduated second in his class of 58 in 1846.

West taught school in Kentucky until 1848, when he accepted a tutorship at Jefferson College, and then a year later an adjunct professorship at Hampden–Sydney College. In 1850 he became a law student of William Lawrence at Bellefontaine, Ohio. After admission to the bar, West was law partner of Lawrence from July 1851 to February, 1854. In 1852, he was elected Prosecuting Attorney of Logan County, Ohio, where he lived at Bellefontaine the rest of his life. He was an important force in the formation of the Republican Party in Ohio, and a prominent speaker at the Anti-Nebraska Party convention in Columbus in 1854. He was elected to represent his county in the Ohio House of Representatives for the 53rd General Assembly, 1858–1859, declined nomination in 1859, and was elected to the 55th General Assembly, 1862–1863. West was a delegate to the 1860 Republican National Convention which nominated Abraham Lincoln.

West was elected to the Ohio Senate for the 56th General Assembly, 1864–1865. He was elected Ohio Attorney General in 1865 and then re-elected in 1867. In 1869, he was appointed United States Consul to Rio de Janeiro by President Grant, and confirmed by the Senate, but declined. In 1871, West was elected a judge on the Ohio Supreme Court, but resigned after about a year due to failing eyesight. In 1873, he was elected a delegate to the State Constitutional Convention.

In 1877, West was nominated by his party for governor. A railroad strike was in progress at the time of the convention, and West spoke to an assembled crowd. He took the side of labor. This helped contribute to his defeat that autumn.

West presented James G. Blaine for nomination for president at the 1884 Republican National Convention, with the understanding that he would be appointed attorney general if Blaine should be president. Blaine lost. West continued to argue cases at the Logan County Courthouse until his 80th birthday in 1904, with only the steep steps and lack of an elevator leading to his retirement.

West was married twice. His first marriage was to Elizabeth Williams in Lima on June 19, 1851. They had four sons, and Elizabeth died in 1871. In 1872, West married Clara Riddle Gorton. She died in 1901. He died at his home in Bellefontaine on March 14, 1911. West was interred at Bellefontaine City Cemetery, where his wives had been buried.

== See also ==
- List of justices of the Ohio Supreme Court

== Notes ==
Legal offices
Preceded by Chauncey N. Olds	Ohio Attorney General; 1866-1870	Succeeded by Francis Bates Pond
Preceded by Josiah Scott	Ohio Supreme Court Judges; 1872-1873	Succeeded by Walter F. Stone
Ohio House of Representatives
Preceded by Samuel M. Allen	Representative from Logan County; 1858-1859	Succeeded by James W. Hamilton
Preceded by James W. Hamilton	Representative from Logan County; 1862-1863	Succeeded by Charles W. B. Allison
Ohio Senate
Preceded by John Hood	Senator from 13th District; 1864-1865	Succeeded by P. B. Cole
Party political offices
Preceded by Rutherford B. Hayes	Republican Party nominee for Governor of Ohio; 1877	Succeeded by Charles Foster
